= 2022 Nevada Assembly election =

- November 8, 2022

All 42 seats in the Nevada Assembly 22 seats needed for a majority
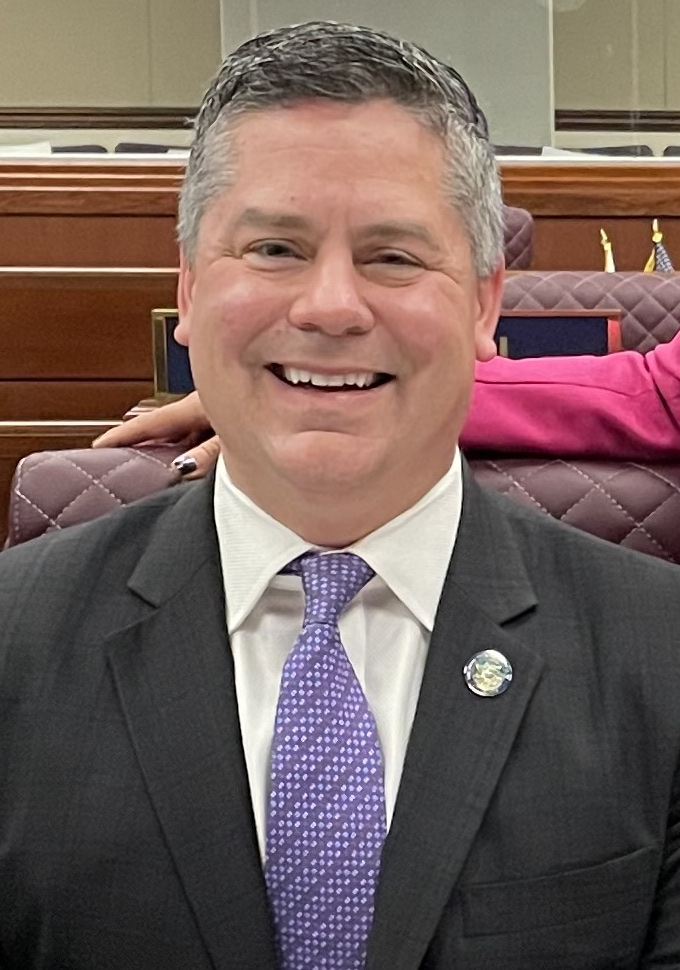

	Majority party	Minority party
Leader	Steve Yeager (acting)	Robin Titus (retired)
Party	Democratic	Republican
Leader's seat	9th - Las Vegas	38th - Wellington
Seats before	26	16
Seats won	28	14
Seat change	▲2	▼2
Popular vote	397,353	415,522 (Note: Excludes 5 uncontested Republican seats)
Percentage	47.42%	49.59%
Swing	▲0.68%	▼1.91%
- Democratic gain Democratic hold Republican hold 40–50% 50–60% 60–70% 70–80% 80–90% 50–60% 60–70% 70–80% 80–90% >90%
Speaker before election
Steve Yeager (acting)
Democratic
Elected Speaker
Steve Yeager
Democratic

The 2022 Nevada Assembly election was held on November 8, 2022. The election coincided with elections for other offices including for governor, the U.S. Senate, the U.S. House of Representatives, and the Nevada Senate. The primary election was held on June 14, 2022.

Despite Republicans winning 56% of the popular vote among all State Assembly Districts, Democrats gained two seats, winning a supermajority of 28 out of 42 seats. The discrepancy is explained by Democrats' not fielding a candidate in seven safely Republican seats and lower turnout in Democratic-won districts. Democrats won 83% of Assembly districts in Clark County with only 52% of the popular vote in the county.

== Predictions ==
Source	Ranking	As of
Sabato's Crystal Ball	Likely D	May 19, 2022

== Results summary ==
State House district	Incumbent	Party	Elected Representative	Party
1st	Daniele Monroe-Moreno	Dem	Daniele Monroe-Moreno	Dem
2nd	Heidi Kasama	Rep	Heidi Kasama	Rep
3rd	Selena Torres	Dem	Selena Torres	Dem
4th	Richard McArthur	Rep	Richard McArthur	Rep
5th	Brittney Miller	Dem	Brittney Miller	Dem
6th	Shondra Summers-Armstrong	Dem	Shondra Summers-Armstrong	Dem
7th	Cameron Miller	Dem	Cameron Miller	Dem
8th	Jason Frierson†	Dem	Duy Nguyen	Dem
9th	Steve Yeager	Dem	Steve Yeager	Dem
10th	Rochelle Nguyen	Dem	Rochelle Nguyen	Dem
11th	Bea Duran	Dem	Bea Duran	Dem
12th	Susie Martinez†	Dem	Max Carter	Dem
13th	Tom Roberts†	Rep	Brian Hibbetts	Rep
14th	Maggie Carlton†	Dem	Erica Mosca	Dem
15th	Howard Watts III	Dem	Howard Watts III	Dem
16th	Cecelia González	Dem	Cecelia González	Dem
17th	Clara Thomas	Dem	Clara Thomas	Dem
18th	Venicia Considine	Dem	Venicia Considine	Dem
19th	Annie Black†	Rep	Toby Yurek	Rep
20th	David Orentlicher	Dem	David Orentlicher	Dem
21st	Elaine Marzola	Dem	Elaine Marzola	Dem
22nd	Melissa Hardy	Rep	Melissa Hardy	Rep
23rd	Glen Leavitt†	Rep	Danielle Gallant	Rep
24th	Sarah Peters	Dem	Sarah Peters	Dem
25th	Jill Tolles†	Rep	Selena La Rue Hatch	Dem
26th	Lisa Krasner†	Rep	Rich DeLong	Rep
27th	Teresa Benitez-Thompson†	Dem	Angie Taylor	Dem
28th	Edgar Flores†	Dem	Reuben D'Silva	Dem
29th	Lesley Cohen	Dem	Lesley Cohen	Dem
30th	Natha Anderson	Dem	Natha Anderson	Dem
31st	Jill Dickman	Rep	Jill Dickman	Rep
32nd	Alexis Hansen	Rep	Alexis Hansen	Rep
33rd	John Ellison†	Rep	Bert Gurr	Rep
34th	Shannon Bilbray-Axelrod	Dem	Shannon Bilbray-Axelrod	Dem
35th	Michelle Gorelow	Dem	Michelle Gorelow	Dem
36th	Gregory Hafen II	Rep	Gregory Hafen II	Rep
37th	Andy Matthews†	Rep	Shea Backus	Dem
38th	Robin Titus†	Rep	Gregory Koenig	Rep
39th	Jim Wheeler†	Rep	Ken Gray	Rep
40th	P. K. O'Neill	Rep	P. K. O'Neill	Rep
41st	Sandra Jauregui	Dem	Sandra Jauregui	Dem
42nd	Tracy Brown-May	Dem	Tracy Brown-May	Dem

† - Incumbent not seeking re-election

=== Overview ===
Summary of the November 8, 2022 Nevada Assembly election results
Party	Candidates	Votes	%	Seats	+/–
Democratic	35	397,353	41.42	28	▲2
Republican	42	536,798	55.96	14	▼2
Libertarian	11	24,425	2.55	0	Steady
Independent	1	670	0.07	0	Steady
Valid votes		959,246	51.62	-	-
Blank or invalid		64,371	48.38	-	-
Total		1,023,617	100	42	Steady
Abstentions		847,571	45.30	-	-
Registered voters / turnout		1,871,188	54.70	-	-

=== Close races ===
Seats where the margin of victory was under 10%:

1. State Assembly district 35, 1.52%
2. State Assembly district 12, 1.88%
3. State Assembly district 37, 2.57% (gain)
4. State Assembly district 21, 4.82%
5. State Assembly district 41, 5.7%
6. State Assembly district 29, 6.28%
7. State Assembly district 9, 6.42%
8. State Assembly district 5, 7.39%
9. State Assembly district 16, 7.72%
10. State Assembly district 25, 7.8% (gain)

== Detailed results ==
=== District 1 ===
Incumbent Democrat Daniele Monroe-Moreno had represented the 1st district since 2016.

Nevada Assembly 1st district general election, 2022
Party	Candidate	Votes	%
Democratic	Daniele Monroe-Moreno (incumbent)	14,242	54.82%
Republican	Garland Lee Brinkley	11,067	42.60%
Independent	Patrick "Mac" McAtee-MacRae	670	2.58%
Total votes		25,979	100%
Democratic hold			

=== District 2 ===
Incumbent Republican Heidi Kasama had represented the 2nd district since 2020.

Nevada Assembly 2nd district general election, 2022
Party	Candidate	Votes	%
Republican	Heidi Kasama (incumbent)	16,221	54.34%
Democratic	Nick Christenson	13,216	44.28%
Libertarian	Jason Bednarz	412	1.38%
Total votes		29,849	100%
Republican hold			

=== District 3 ===
Incumbent Democrat Selena Torres had represented the 3rd district since 2018.

Nevada Assembly 3rd district general election, 2022
Party	Candidate	Votes	%
Democratic	Selena Torres (incumbent)	10,345	55.33%
Republican	Joshua Lemack	8,353	44.67%
Total votes		18,698	100%
Democratic hold			

=== District 4 ===
Incumbent Republican Richard McArthur had represented the 4th district since 2020.

Nevada Assembly 4th district general election, 2022
Party	Candidate	Votes	%
Republican	Richard McArthur (incumbent)	15,835	62.62%
Libertarian	Darby Burns	9,452	37.38%
Total votes		25,287	100%
Republican hold			

=== District 5 ===
Incumbent Democrat Brittney Miller had represented the 5th district since 2016.

Nevada Assembly 5th district general election, 2022
Party	Candidate	Votes	%
Democratic	Brittney Miller (incumbent)	12,008	52.88%
Republican	Kelly Quinn	10,330	45.49%
Libertarian	Ronald Morgan	372	1.64%
Total votes		22,710	100%
Democratic hold			

=== District 6 ===
Incumbent Democrat Shondra Summers-Armstrong had represented the 6th district since 2020.

Nevada Assembly 6th district general election, 2022
Party	Candidate	Votes	%
Democratic	Shondra Summers-Armstrong (incumbent)	8,083	81.43%
Republican	Kathryn Rios	1,843	18.57%
Total votes		9,926	100%
Democratic hold			

=== District 7 ===
Incumbent Democrat Cameron Miller had represented the 7th district since 2020.

Nevada Assembly 7th district general election, 2022
Party	Candidate	Votes	%
Democratic	Cameron Miller (incumbent)	11,149	63.45%
Republican	Anthony Palmer	6,421	36.55%
Total votes		17,570	100%
Democratic hold			

=== District 8 ===
Incumbent Democrat and then House Speaker Jason Frierson had represented the 8th district since 2016, but resigned after being appointed United States Attorney for the District of Nevada. Fellow Democrat Duy Nguyen won the open seat.

Nevada Assembly 8th district general election, 2022
Party	Candidate	Votes	%
Democratic	Duy Nguyen	11,475	55.93%
Republican	Jenann Logan	9,042	44.07%
Total votes		20,517	100%
Democratic hold			

=== District 9 ===
Incumbent Democrat and acting House Speaker Steve Yeager had represented the 9th district since 2016.

Nevada Assembly 9th district general election, 2022
Party	Candidate	Votes	%
Democratic	Steve Yeager (incumbent)	12,181	53.21%
Republican	Ryan Fleming	10,710	46.79%
Total votes		22,891	100%
Democratic hold			

=== District 10 ===
Incumbent Democrat Rochelle Nguyen had represented the 10th district since 2018.

Nevada Assembly 10th district general election, 2022
Party	Candidate	Votes	%
Democratic	Rochelle Nguyen (incumbent)	9,957	58.19%
Republican	Sandie Hernandez	7,155	41.81%
Total votes		17,112	100%
Democratic hold			

=== District 11 ===
Incumbent Democrat Bea Duran had represented the 11th district since 2018.

Nevada Assembly 11th district general election, 2022
Party	Candidate	Votes	%
Democratic	Bea Duran (incumbent)	6,128	73.35%
Republican	Eric Krattiger	2,227	26.65%
Total votes		8,355	100%
Democratic hold			

=== District 12 ===
Incumbent Democrat Susie Martinez had represented the 12th district since 2018. Martinez did not seek re-election, and fellow Democrat Max Carter won the open seat.

Nevada Assembly 12th district general election, 2022
Party	Candidate	Votes	%
Democratic	Max Carter	10,450	50.94%
Republican	Flemming Larsen	10,066	49.06%
Total votes		20,516	100%
Democratic hold			

=== District 13 ===
Incumbent Republican Tom Roberts had represented the 13th district since 2018. Roberts retired to run for Sheriff of Clark County, and fellow Republican Brian Hibbetts won the open seat.

Nevada Assembly 13th district general election, 2022
Party	Candidate	Votes	%
Republican	Brian Hibbetts	16,288	55.55%
Democratic	Will Rucker	13,033	44.45%
Total votes		29,321	100%
Republican hold			

=== District 14 ===
Incumbent Democrat Maggie Carlton had represented the 14th district since 2010. Carlton was term-limited, and fellow Democrat Erica Mosca won the open seat.

Nevada Assembly 14th district general election, 2022
Party	Candidate	Votes	%
Democratic	Erica Mosca	8,236	66.00%
Republican	Shawn Stamper	4,242	34.00%
Total votes		12,478	100%
Democratic hold			

=== District 15 ===
Incumbent Democrat Howard Watts III had represented the 15th district since 2018.

Nevada Assembly 15th district general election, 2022
Party	Candidate	Votes	%
Democratic	Howard Watts III (incumbent)	7,602	62.53%
Republican	Steven Bang	4,556	37.47%
Total votes		12,158	100%
Democratic hold			

=== District 16 ===
Incumbent Democrat Cecelia González had represented the 16th district since 2020.

Nevada Assembly 16th district general election, 2022
Party	Candidate	Votes	%
Democratic	Cecelia González (incumbent)	9,569	53.86%
Republican	Jesse "Jake" Holder	8,198	46.14%
Total votes		17,767	100%
Democratic hold			

=== District 17 ===
Incumbent Democrat Clara Thomas had represented the 17th district since 2020.

Nevada Assembly 17th district general election, 2022
Party	Candidate	Votes	%
Democratic	Clara Thomas (incumbent)	11,454	65.52%
Republican	Eugene Pawley III	6,027	34.48%
Total votes		17,481	100%
Democratic hold			

=== District 18 ===
Incumbent Democrat Venicia Considine had represented the 18th district since 2020.

Nevada Assembly 18th district general election, 2022
Party	Candidate	Votes	%
Democratic	Venicia Considine (incumbent)	10,363	60.37%
Republican	Christine DeCorte	6,804	39.63%
Total votes		17,167	100%
Democratic hold			

=== District 19 ===
Incumbent Republican Annie Black had represented the 19th district since 2020. Black didn't seek re-election, and fellow Republican Toby Yurek won the open seat.

Nevada Assembly 19th district general election, 2022
Party	Candidate	Votes	%
Republican	Toby Yurek	26,274	100%
Total votes		26,274	100%
Republican hold			

=== District 20 ===
Incumbent Democrat David Orentlicher had represented the 20th district since 2020.

Nevada Assembly 20th district general election, 2022
Party	Candidate	Votes	%
Democratic	David Orentlicher (incumbent)	10,287	59.44%
Republican	Stan Vaughan	6,530	37.73%
Libertarian	Josiah LaRow	490	2.83%
Total votes		17,307	100%
Democratic hold			

=== District 21 ===
Incumbent Democrat Elaine Marzola had represented the 21st district since 2020.

Nevada Assembly 21st district general election, 2022
Party	Candidate	Votes	%
Democratic	Elaine Marzola (incumbent)	14,048	52.41%
Republican	Jon Petrick	12,756	47.59%
Total votes		26,804	100%
Democratic hold			

=== District 22 ===
Incumbent Republican Melissa Hardy had represented the 22nd district since 2018.

Nevada Assembly 22nd district general election, 2022
Party	Candidate	Votes	%
Republican	Melissa Hardy (incumbent)	18,628	58.54%
Democratic	Rick Ramos	13,193	41.46%
Total votes		31,821	100%
Republican hold			

=== District 23 ===
Incumbent Republican Glen Leavitt had represdented the 23rd district since 2018. Leavitt didn't seek re-election, and fellow Republican Danielle Gallant won the open seat.

Nevada Assembly 23rd district general election, 2022
Party	Candidate	Votes	%
Republican	Danielle Gallant	23,377	58.87%
Democratic	Elizabeth Brickfield	15,726	39.60%
Libertarian	Mercy Manley	606	1.53%
Total votes		39,709	100%
Republican hold			

=== District 24 ===
Incumbent Democrat Sarah Peters had represented the 24th district since 2018.

Nevada Assembly 24th district eneral election, 2022
Party	Candidate	Votes	%
Democratic	Sarah Peters (incumbent)	12,227	65.91%
Republican	Dorzell King	6,325	34.09%
Total votes		18,552	100%
Democratic hold			

=== District 25 ===
Incumbent Republican Jill Tolles had represented the 25th district since 2016. Tolles didn't seek re-election, and Democrat Selena La Rue Hatch won the open seat.

Nevada Assembly 25th district eneral election, 2022
Party	Candidate	Votes	%
Democratic	Selena La Rue Hatch	17,608	53.90%
Republican	Sam Kumar	15,060	46.10%
Total votes		32,668	100%
Democratic gain from Republican			

=== District 26 ===
Incumbent Republican Lisa Krasner had represented the 26th district since 2016. Krasner retired to run for the Nevada Senate, and fellow Republican Rich DeLong won the open seat.

Nevada Assembly 26th district general election, 2022
Party	Candidate	Votes	%
Republican	Rich DeLong	23,964	71.71%
Libertarian	Reed Mitchell	9,455	28.29%
Total votes		33,419	100%
Republican hold			

=== District 27 ===
Incumbent Democrat Teresa Benitez-Thompson had represented the 27th district since 2010. Benitez-Thompson was term-limited, and fellow Democrat Angie Taylor won the open seat.

Nevada Assembly 27th district general election, 2022
Party	Candidate	Votes	%
Democratic	Angie Taylor	12,804	58.21%
Republican	Carmen Ortiz	9,193	41.79%
Total votes		21,997	100%
Democratic hold			

=== District 28 ===
Incumbent Democrat Edgar Flores had represented the 28th district since 2014. Flores retired to run for the Nevada Senate, and fellow Democrat Reuben D'Silva won the open seat.

Nevada Assembly 28th district general election, 2022
Party	Candidate	Votes	%
Democratic	Reuben D'Silva	6,323	67.42%
Republican	Clint Brown	3,055	32.58%
Total votes		9,378	100%
Democratic hold			

=== District 29 ===
Incumbent Democrat Lesley Cohen had represented the 29th district since 2016.

Nevada Assembly 29th district general election, 2022
Party	Candidate	Votes	%
Democratic	Lesley Cohen (incumbent)	12,679	53.14%
Republican	Rhonda Knightly	11,181	46.86%
Total votes		23,860	100%
Democratic hold			

=== District 30 ===
Incumbent Democrat Natha Anderson had represented the 30th district since 2020.

Nevada Assembly 30th district general election, 2022
Party	Candidate	Votes	%
Democratic	Natha Anderson (incumbent)	10,668	55.21%
Republican	Ricci Rodriguez-Elkins	8,007	41.44%
Libertarian	Garrett McGeein	649	3.36%
Total votes		19,324	100%
Democratic hold			

=== District 31 ===
Incumbent Republican Jill Dickman had represented the 31st district since 2020.

Nevada Assembly 31st district general election, 2022
Party	Candidate	Votes	%
Republican	Jill Dickman (incumbent)	24,926	100%
Total votes		24,926	100%
Republican hold			

=== District 32 ===
Incumbent Republican Alexis Hansen had represented the 32nd district since 2018.

Nevada Assembly 32nd district general election, 2022
Party	Candidate	Votes	%
Republican	Alexis Hansen (incumbent)	22,761	100%
Total votes		22,761	100%
Republican hold			

=== District 33 ===
Incumbent Republican John Ellison had represdented the 33rd district since 2010. Ellison was term-limited, and fellow Republican Bert Gurr won the open seat.

Nevada Assembly 33rd district general election, 2022
Party	Candidate	Votes	%
Republican	Bert Gurr	20,327	80.87%
Democratic	John Garrard	4,809	19.13%
Total votes		25,136	100%
Republican hold			

=== District 34 ===
Incumbent Democrat Shannon Bilbray-Axelrod had represented the 34th district since 2016.

Nevada Assembly 34th district general election, 2022
Party	Candidate	Votes	%
Democratic	Shannon Bilbray-Axelrod (incumbent)	12,192	56.12%
Republican	Stacy Butler	9,533	43.88%
Total votes		21,725	100%
Democratic hold			

=== District 35 ===
Incumbent Democrat Michelle Gorelow had represented the 35th district since 2018.

Nevada Assembly 35th district general election, 2022
Party	Candidate	Votes	%
Democratic	Michelle Gorelow (incumbent)	12,316	48.93%
Republican	Tiffany Jones	11,934	47.41%
Libertarian	Mindy Robinson	920	3.66%
Total votes		25,170	100%
Democratic hold			

=== District 36 ===
Incumbent Republican Gregory Hafen II had represented the 36th district since 2018.

Nevada Assembly 36th district general election, 2022
Party	Candidate	Votes	%
Republican	Gregory Hafen II (incumbent)	24,487	100%
Total votes		24,487	100%
Republican hold			

=== District 37 ===
Incumbent Republican Andy Matthews had represented the 37th district since 2020. Matthews retired to run for State Controller, and former Democratic representative Shea Backus won the open seat.

Nevada Assembly 37th district general election, 2022
Party	Candidate	Votes	%
Democratic	Shea Backus	15,817	50.49%
Republican	Jacob Deaville	15,011	47.92%
Libertarian	Marc Tedoff	500	1.60%
Total votes		32,328	100%
Democratic gain from Republican			

=== District 38 ===
Incumbent Republican and Minority Leader Robin Titus had represented the 38th district since 2014. Titus retired to run for the Nevada Senate, and fellow Republican Gregory Koenig won the open seat.

Nevada Assembly 38th district general election, 2022
Party	Candidate	Votes	%
Republican	Gregory Koenig	22,828	100%
Total votes		22,828	100%
Republican hold			

=== District 39 ===
Incumbent Republican Jim Wheeler had represented the 39th district since 2012. Wheeler did not seek re-election, and fellow Republican Ken Gray won the open seat.

Nevada Assembly 39th district general election, 2022
Party	Candidate	Votes	%
Republican	Ken Gray	26,574	70.17%
Democratic	Janice Noble	11,299	29.83%
Total votes		37,873	100%
Republican hold			

=== District 40 ===
Incumbent Republican P. K. O'Neill had represented the 40th district since 2020.

Nevada Assembly 40th district general election, 2022
Party	Candidate	Votes	%
Republican	P. K. O'Neill (incumbent)	19,152	58.81%
Democratic	Shannon McDaniel	12,362	37.96%
Libertarian	Sam Toll	1,053	3.23%
Total votes		32,567	100%
Republican hold			

=== District 41 ===
Incumbent Democrat Sandra Jauregui had represented the 41st district since 2016.

Nevada Assembly 41st district general election, 2022
Party	Candidate	Votes	%
Democratic	Sandra Jauregui (incumbent)	12,389	51.77%
Republican	Paul Bodine	11,026	46.07%
Libertarian	Sean McNamara	516	2.16%
Total votes		23,931	100%
Democratic hold			

=== District 42 ===
Incumbent Democrat Tracy Brown-May had represented the 42nd district since her appointment in 2021. Brown-May was elected to a full term.

Nevada Assembly 42nd district general election, 2022
Party	Candidate	Votes	%
Democratic	Tracy Brown-May (incumbent)	11,115	56.65%
Republican	Eddie Facey	8,504	43.35%
Total votes		19,619	100%
Democratic hold			

== See also ==
- 2022 Nevada elections
- List of Nevada state legislatures
