= 2024 Nevada Assembly election =

- November 5, 2024

All 42 seats in the Nevada Assembly 22 seats needed for a majority
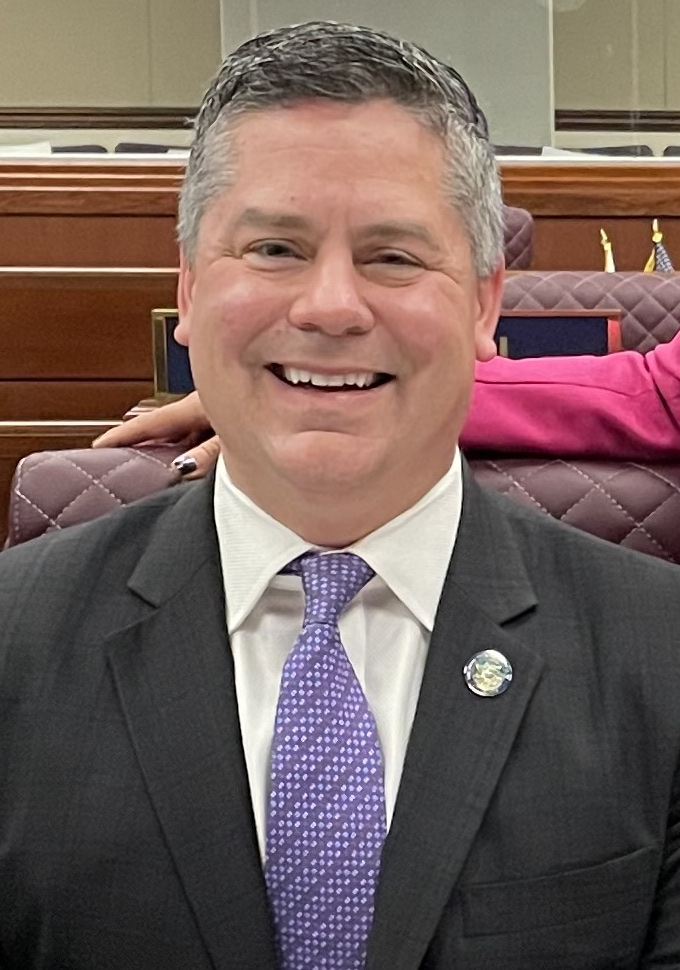

	Majority party	Minority party
Leader	Steve Yeager	P. K. O'Neill
Party	Democratic	Republican
Leader's seat	9th - Las Vegas	40th - Carson City
Last election	28	14
Seats won	27	15
Seat change	▼1	▲1
Popular vote	614,370	714,720
Percentage	45.64%	53.10%
Swing	▲4.22%	▼2.86%
- Republican gain Democratic hold Republican hold 50–60% 60–70% >90% 50–60% 60–70% 70–80% 80–90% >90%
Speaker before election
Steve Yeager
Democratic
Elected Speaker
Steve Yeager
Democratic

Elections to the Nevada Assembly was held on November 5, 2024. Elections were also be held in the state for U.S. President, U.S. Senate, U.S. House of Representatives, and for the Nevada Senate. Primary elections were held on June 11, 2024.

Republicans made a gain of one seat and broke the Democratic two-thirds supermajority, but they were unable to make further gains. The Nevada Independent partially attributed the underwhelming Republican gains to the impact of gerrymandering imposed by the Democratic-controlled Nevada Legislature in 2021.

== Predictions ==
Source	Ranking	As of
CNalysis	Very Likely D	March 25, 2024
Sabato's Crystal Ball	Safe D	October 23, 2024

== Results summary ==
Affiliation	Candidates	Votes	Vote %	Seats won
Democratic	37	614,370	45.64	27
Republican	37	714,720	53.10	15
Libertarian	5	15,058	1.12	0
Independent	1	1,894	0.14	0
Total	80	1,346,042	100.00	42

† - Incumbent not seeking re-election

District	2020 Pres.	Incumbent			Candidates	Result
District	2020 Pres.	Member	Party	First elected	Candidates	Result
1	D +12.9	Daniele Monroe-Moreno	Democratic	2016	▌Daniele Monroe-Moreno (Democratic); ▌Garland Brinkley (Republican)	
2	R +0.9	Heidi Kasama	Republican	2020	▌Ronald Steven Nelsen (Democratic); ▌Heidi Kasama (Republican)	
3	D +14.5	Selena Torres	Democratic	2018	▌Selena Torres (Democratic); ▌Michele Rizza (Republican)	
4	R +5.1	Richard McArthur†	Republican	2008; 2016; 2020	▌Ryan Hampton (Democratic); ▌Lisa Cole (Republican)	
5	D +10.3	Brittney Miller	Democratic	2016	▌Brittney Miller (Democratic); ▌Kelly Quinn (Republican); ▌Ronald Morgan (Libertarian); Republican primary: ▌ ✓ Kelly Quinn (Republican); ▌Alan Bigelow (Republican)	
6	D +62.2	Shondra Summers-Armstrong†	Democratic	2020	▌Jovan Jackson (Democratic); ▌Nephi Oliva (Republican); Democratic primary: ▌ ✓ Jovan Jackson (Democratic); ▌Derek Rimson (Democratic); ▌Walter Jones III (Democratic)	
7	D +32.8	Vacant (Note: Democratic Representative Cameron Miller resigned on October 30, 2023 to run for a seat on the Las Vegas City Council.)			▌Tanya Flanagan (Democratic); Democratic primary: ▌ ✓ Tanya Flanagan (Democratic); ▌James Fennell (Democratic)	
8	D +12.9	Duy Nguyen	Democratic	2022	▌Duy Nguyen (Democratic); ▌Kelly Chapman (Republican)	
9	D +9.3	Steve Yeager	Democratic	2016	▌Steve Yeager (Democratic); ▌Erica Neely (Republican); Democratic primary: ▌ ✓ Steve Yeager (Democratic); ▌Adeline Ceilo (Democratic)	
10	D +19.6	Vacant (Note: Democratic Representative Sabra Newby resigned on September 6, 2023 to become the Las Vegas deputy city manager.)			▌Venise Karris (Democratic); ▌Sean Moore (Libertarian); Democratic primary: ▌ ✓ Venise Karris (Democratic); ▌Valerie Thomason (Democratic); ▌Kyle Greenwood (Democratic)	
11	D +47.8	Bea Duran†	Democratic	2018 (appointed); 2020	▌Cinthia Zermeño Moore (Democratic); ▌Jeffrey Lustick (Republican); Democratic primary: ▌ ✓ Cinthia Zermeño Moore (Democratic); ▌Thomas Lambert (Democratic); Republican primary: ▌ ✓ Jeffrey Lustick (Republican); ▌Anthony Manesa (Republican)	
12	D +10.7	Max Carter	Democratic	2022	▌Max Carter (Democratic); ▌Nancy Roecker (Republican); Republican primary: ▌ ✓ Nancy Roecker (Republican); ▌Alejandro Rojas (Republican)	
13	R +8.2	Brian Hibbetts	Republican	2022	▌Daniel Andrews (Democratic); ▌Brian Hibbetts (Republican)	
14	D +32.7	Erica Mosca	Democratic	2022	▌Erica Mosca (Democratic)	
15	D +27.7	Howard Watts III	Democratic	2018	▌Howard Watts III (Democratic); ▌Melissa Spence (Republican); ▌Jordy Viciedo Prado (Libertarian)	
16	D +13.9	Cecelia González	Democratic	2020	▌Cecelia González (Democratic); ▌James Neville (Republican); ▌Jose Pena (Libertarian); Democratic primary: ▌ ✓ Cecelia González (Democratic); ▌Eva Chase (Democratic); Republican primary: ▌ ✓ James Neville (Republican); ▌Socorro Keenan (Republican); ▌Benjamin Donlon (Republican)	
17	D +33.6	Clara Thomas†	Democratic	2020	▌Linda Hunt (Democratic); ▌Robert Olson (Republican); Democratic primary: ▌ ✓ Linda Hunt (Democratic); ▌Mishon Montgomery (Democratic); ▌Chauntille Roberts (Democratic)	
18	D +22.5	Venicia Considine	Democratic	2020	▌Venicia Considine (Democratic); ▌Antario Brown (Republican)	
19	R +30.0	Toby Yurek	Republican	2022	▌Toby Yurek (Republican)	
20	D +21.6	David Orentlicher	Democratic	2020	▌David Orentlicher (Democratic); ▌Stan Vaughan (Republican)	
21	D +6.5	Elaine Marzola	Democratic	2020	▌Elaine Marzola (Democratic); ▌April Arndt (Republican); Republican primary: ▌ ✓ April Arndt (Republican); ▌Jon Petrick (Republican)	
22	R +9.1	Melissa Hardy	Republican	2018	▌Melissa Hardy (Republican)	
23	R +16.3	Danielle Gallant	Republican	2022	▌Danielle Gallant (Republican)	
24	D +31.9	Sarah Peters†	Democratic	2018	▌Erica Roth (Democratic); ▌Teresa Kolesnick (Republican)	
25	D +13.9	Selena La Rue Hatch	Democratic	2022	▌Selena La Rue Hatch (Democratic); ▌Diana Sande (Republican)	
26	R +5.3	Rich DeLong	Republican	2022	▌Diane Sullivan (Democratic); ▌Rich DeLong (Republican); Democratic primary: ▌ ✓ Diane Sullivan (Democratic); ▌Scott Savage (Democratic)	
27	D +17.0	Angie Taylor†	Democratic	2022	▌Heather Goulding (Democratic); ▌Carmen Ortiz (Republican); Democratic primary: ▌ ✓ Heather Goulding (Democratic); ▌Alex Velto (Democratic)	
28	D +39.8	Reuben D'Silva	Democratic	2022	▌Reuben D'Silva (Democratic)	
29	D +8.7	Lesley Cohen†	Democratic	2013 (appointed); 2016	▌Joe Dalia (Democratic); ▌Annette Dawson Owens (Republican); Republican primary: ▌ ✓ Annette Dawson Owens (Republican); ▌Yadusha Williams (Republican)	
30	D +16.9	Natha Anderson	Democratic	2020	▌Natha Anderson (Democratic)	
31	R +13.5	Jill Dickman	Republican	2020	▌Stuart MacKie (Democratic); ▌Jill Dickman (Republican)	
32	R +31.3	Alexis Hansen	Republican	2018	▌Arnold Thomas (Democratic); ▌Alexis Hansen (Republican); Republican primary: ▌ ✓ Alexis Hansen (Republican); ▌Jason Bushey (Republican)	
33	R +55.8	Bert Gurr	Republican	2022	▌Bert Gurr (Republican)	
34	D +16.0	Shannon Bilbray-Axelrod†	Democratic	2016	▌Hanadi Nadeem (Democratic); ▌Brandon Davis (Republican); Republican primary: ▌ ✓ Brandon Davis (Republican); ▌Clement Matthew Ziroli III (Republican)	
35	D +5.0	Michelle Gorelow†	Democratic	2018	▌Sharif Wahab (Democratic); ▌Rebecca Edgeworth (Republican)	
36	R +24.9	Gregory Hafen II	Republican	2018 (appointed); 2020	▌Marlene Drake (Democratic); ▌Gregory Hafen II (Republican)	
37	D +3.0	Shea Backus	Democratic	2018; 2020	▌Shea Backus (Democratic); ▌David Brog (Republican)	
38	R +45.3	Gregory Koenig	Republican	2022	▌Gregory Koenig (Republican)	
39	R +32.2	Ken Gray	Republican	2022	▌Erich Obermayr (Democratic); ▌Ken Gray (Republican)	
40	R +14.4	P. K. O'Neill	Republican	2014; 2020	▌Katherine Ramsey (Democratic); ▌P. K. O'Neill (Republican); Republican primary: ▌ ✓ P. K. O'Neill (Republican); ▌Drew Ribar (Republican)	
41	D +6.7	Sandra Jauregui	Democratic	2016	▌Sandra Jauregui (Democratic); ▌Rafael Arroyo-Montalvo (Republican); Republican primary: ▌ ✓ Rafael Arroyo-Montalvo (Republican); ▌Guadalupe Reyes (Republican)	
42	D +13.8	Tracy Brown-May	Democratic	2021 (appointed); 2022	▌Tracy Brown-May (Democratic); ▌Kevin Child (Republican); Democratic primary: ▌ ✓ Tracy Brown-May (Democratic); ▌Sayed Zaidi (Democratic); Republican primary: ▌ ✓ Kevin Child (Republican); ▌Katrin Ivanoff (Republican)	

=== Incumbents retiring ===
==== Democrats ====
1. District 6: Shondra Summers-Armstrong retired to run for Las Vegas City Council.
2. District 11: Bea Duran retired.
3. District 17: Clara Thomas retired.
4. District 24: Sarah Peters retired.
5. District 27: Angie Taylor retired to run for State Senate.
6. District 29: Lesley Cohen retired.
7. District 34: Shannon Bilbray-Axelrod retired to run for Clark County Commission.
8. District 35: Michelle Gorelow retired.

==== Republicans ====
1. District 4: Richard McArthur retired to run for State Senate.

== Detailed results ==
=== District 1 ===
Incumbent Democrat Daniele Monroe-Moreno has represented the district since 2016.

Nevada State Assembly 1st district general election, 2024
Party	Candidate	Votes	%
Democratic	Daniele Monroe-Moreno (incumbent)	21,103	56.18%
Republican	Garland Brinkley	16,460	43.82%
Total votes		37,563	100%

=== District 2 ===
Incumbent Republican Heidi Kasama has represented the district since 2020.

Nevada State Assembly 2nd district general election, 2024
Party	Candidate	Votes	%
Republican	Heidi Kasama (incumbent)	22,200	55.87%
Democratic	Ronald Steven Nelsen	17,538	44.13%
Total votes		39,738	100%

=== District 3 ===
Incumbent Democrat Selena Torres has represented the district since 2018.

Nevada State Assembly 3rd district general election, 2024
Party	Candidate	Votes	%
Democratic	Selena Torres (incumbent)	15,098	56.03%
Republican	Michele Rizza	11,846	43.97%
Total votes		26,944	100%

=== District 4 ===
Incumbent Republican Richard McArthur has represented the district since 2020.

Nevada State Assembly 4th district general election, 2024
Party	Candidate	Votes	%
Republican	Lisa Cole	21,408	54.38%
Democratic	Ryan Hampton	17,958	45.62%
Total votes		39,366	100%

=== District 5 ===
Incumbent Democrat Brittney Miller has represented the district since 2016.

Nevada State Assembly 5th district Republican primary election, 2024
Party	Candidate	Votes	%
Republican	Kelly Quinn	1,686	58.30%
Republican	Alan Bigelow	1,206	41.70%
Total votes		2,892	100%

Nevada State Assembly 5th district general election, 2024
Party	Candidate	Votes	%
Democratic	Brittney Miller (incumbent)	16,503	50.85%
Republican	Kelly Quinn	15,240	46.96%
Libertarian	Ronald Morgan	712	2.19%
Total votes		32,455	100%

=== District 6 ===
Incumbent Democrat Shondra Summers-Armstrong has represented the district since 2020.

Nevada State Assembly 6th district Democratic primary election, 2024
Party	Candidate	Votes	%
Democratic	Jovan Jackson	2,346	84.06%
Democratic	Derek Rimson	445	15.94%
Total votes		2,791	100%

Nevada State Assembly 6th district general election, 2024
Party	Candidate	Votes	%
Democratic	Jovan Jackson	12,422	69.91%
Republican	Nephi Oliva	3,452	19.43%
Independent	Walter Jones III	1,894	10.66%
Total votes		17,768	100%

=== District 7 ===
This seat has been vacant since October 30, 2023, when Democratic Representative Cameron Miller resigned to run for a seat on the Las Vegas City Council.

Nevada State Assembly 7th district Democratic primary election, 2024
Party	Candidate	Votes	%
Democratic	Tanya Flanagan	2,760	80.49%
Democratic	James Fennell	669	19.51%
Total votes		3,429	100%

Nevada State Assembly 7th district general election, 2024
Party	Candidate	Votes	%
Democratic	Tanya Flanagan	21,626	100%
Total votes		21,626	100%

=== District 8 ===
Incumbent Democrat Duy Nguyen has represented the district since 2022.

Nevada State Assembly 8th district general election, 2024
Party	Candidate	Votes	%
Democratic	Duy Nguyen (incumbent)	18,787	53.58%
Republican	Kelly Chapman	16,275	46.42%
Total votes		35,062	100%

=== District 9 ===
Incumbent Democrat Steve Yeager has represented the district since 2016.

Nevada State Assembly 9th district Democratic primary election, 2024
Party	Candidate	Votes	%
Democratic	Steve Yeager (incumbent)	2,480	83.14%
Democratic	Adeline Ceilo	503	16.86%
Total votes		2,983	100%

Nevada State Assembly 9th district general election, 2024
Party	Candidate	Votes	%
Democratic	Steve Yeager (incumbent)	17,801	51.11%
Republican	Erica Neely	17,026	48.89%
Total votes		34,827	100%

=== District 10 ===
This seat has been vacant since September 6, 2023, when Democratic Representative Sabra Newby resigned to become the Las Vegas deputy city manager.

Nevada State Assembly 10th district Democratic primary election, 2024
Party	Candidate	Votes	%
Democratic	Venise Karris	1,707	47.27%
Democratic	Val Thomason	1,246	34.51%
Democratic	Kyle Greenwood	658	18.22%
Total votes		3,611	100%

Nevada State Assembly 10th district general election, 2024
Party	Candidate	Votes	%
Democratic	Venise Karris	14,464	64.56%
Libertarian	Sean Moore	7,940	35.44%
Total votes		22,404	100%

=== District 11 ===
Incumbent Democrat Bea Duran has represented the district since 2018.

Nevada State Assembly 11th district Democratic primary election, 2024
Party	Candidate	Votes	%
Democratic	Cinthia Moore	1,161	78.45%
Democratic	Thomas Lambert	319	21.55%
Total votes		1,480	100%

Nevada State Assembly 11th district Republican primary election, 2024
Party	Candidate	Votes	%
Republican	Jeffrey Lustick	317	67.59%
Republican	Anthony Manesa	152	32.41%
Total votes		469	100%

Nevada State Assembly 11th district general election, 2024
Party	Candidate	Votes	%
Democratic	Cinthia Moore	10,115	69.34%
Republican	Jeffrey Lustick	4,472	30.66%
Total votes		14,587	100%

=== District 12 ===
Incumbent Democrat Max Carter has represented the district since 2022.

Nevada State Assembly 12th district Republican primary election, 2024
Party	Candidate	Votes	%
Republican	Nancy Roecker	1,821	59.80%
Republican	Alejandro Rojas	1,224	40.20%
Total votes		3,045	100%

Nevada State Assembly 12th district general election, 2024
Party	Candidate	Votes	%
Democratic	Max Carter (incumbent)	15,758	50.44%
Republican	Nancy Roecker	15,481	49.56%
Total votes		31,239	100%

=== District 13 ===
Incumbent Republican Brian Hibbetts has represented the district since 2022.

Nevada State Assembly 13th district general election, 2024
Party	Candidate	Votes	%
Republican	Brian Hibbetts (incumbent)	23,265	55.5%
Democratic	Daniel Andrews	18,657	44.5%
Total votes		41,922	100%

=== District 14 ===
Incumbent Democrat Erica Mosca has represented the district since 2022.

Nevada State Assembly 14th district general election, 2024
Party	Candidate	Votes	%
Democratic	Erica Mosca (incumbent)	15,168	100%
Total votes		15,168	100%

=== District 15 ===
Incumbent Democrat Howard Watts III has represented the district since 2018.

Nevada State Assembly 15th district general election, 2024
Party	Candidate	Votes	%
Democratic	Howard Watts III (incumbent)	10,930	58.31%
Republican	Melissa Spence	7,226	38.55%
Libertarian	Jordy Viciedo Prado	590	3.15%
Total votes		18,746	100%

=== District 16 ===
Incumbent Democrat Cecelia González has represented the district since 2020.

Nevada State Assembly 16th district Democratic primary election, 2024
Party	Candidate	Votes	%
Democratic	Cecelia González (incumbent)	1,771	72.70%
Democratic	Eva Chase	665	27.30%
Total votes		2,436	100%

Nevada State Assembly 16th district Republican primary election, 2024
Party	Candidate	Votes	%
Republican	James Neville	685	37.87%
Republican	Socorro Keenan	585	32.34%
Republican	Benjamin Donlon	539	29.80%
Total votes		1,809	100%

Nevada State Assembly 16th district general election, 2024
Party	Candidate	Votes	%
Democratic	Cecelia González (incumbent)	13,621	52.22%
Republican	James Neville	11,657	44.69%
Libertarian	Jose Pena	807	3.09%
Total votes		26,085	100%

=== District 17 ===
Incumbent Democrat Clara Thomas has represented the district since 2020.

Nevada State Assembly 17th district Democratic primary election, 2024
Party	Candidate	Votes	%
Democratic	Linda F. Hunt	2,603	64.03%
Democratic	Mishon Montgomery	1,128	27.75%
Democratic	Chauntille Roberts	334	8.22%
Total votes		4,065	100%

Nevada State Assembly 17th district general election, 2024
Party	Candidate	Votes	%
Democratic	Linda F. Hunt	19,585	64.70%
Republican	Robert Olson	10,686	35.30%
Total votes		30,271	100%

=== District 18 ===
Incumbent Democrat Venicia Considine has represented the district since 2020.

Nevada State Assembly 18th district general election, 2024
Party	Candidate	Votes	%
Democratic	Venicia Considine (incumbent)	15,794	59.49%
Republican	Antario Brown	10,755	40.51%
Total votes		26,549	100%

=== District 19 ===
Incumbent Republican Toby Yurek has represented the district since 2022.

Nevada State Assembly 19th district general election, 2024
Party	Candidate	Votes	%
Republican	Toby Yurek (incumbent)	34,907	100%
Total votes		34,907	100%

=== District 20 ===
Incumbent Democrat David Orentlicher has represented the district since 2020.

Nevada State Assembly 20th district general election, 2024
Party	Candidate	Votes	%
Democratic	David Orentlicher (incumbent)	14,232	58.84%
Republican	Stan Vaughan	9,955	41.16%
Total votes		24,187	100%

=== District 21 ===
Incumbent Democrat Elaine Marzola has represented the district since 2020.

Nevada State Assembly 21st district Republican primary election, 2024
Party	Candidate	Votes	%
Republican	April Arndt	1,940	55.46%
Republican	Jon Petrick	1,558	44.54%
Total votes		3,498	100%

Nevada State Assembly 21st district general election, 2024
Party	Candidate	Votes	%
Democratic	Elaine Marzola (incumbent)	18,473	50.73%
Republican	April Arndt	17,938	49.27%
Total votes		36,411	100%

=== District 22 ===
Incumbent Republican Melissa Hardy has represented the district since 2018.

Nevada State Assembly 22nd district general election, 2024
Party	Candidate	Votes	%
Republican	Melissa Hardy (incumbent)	34,242	100%
Total votes		34,242	100%

=== District 23 ===
Incumbent Republican Danielle Gallant has represented the district since 2018.

Nevada State Assembly 23rd district general election, 2024
Party	Candidate	Votes	%
Republican	Danielle Gallant (incumbent)	37,683	100%
Total votes		37,683	100%

=== District 24 ===
Incumbent Democrat Sarah Peters has represented the district since 2018.

Nevada State Assembly 24th district general election, 2024
Party	Candidate	Votes	%
Democratic	Erica Roth	17,079	64.33%
Republican	Teresa Kolesnick	9,470	35.67%
Total votes		26,549	100%

=== District 25 ===
Incumbent Democrat Selena La Rue Hatch has represented the district since 2022.

Nevada State Assembly 25th district general election, 2024
Party	Candidate	Votes	%
Democratic	Selena La Rue Hatch (incumbent)	21,586	53.51%
Republican	Diane Sande	18,754	46.49%
Total votes		40,340	100%

=== District 26 ===
Incumbent Republican Rich DeLong has represented the district since 2022.

Nevada State Assembly 26th district Democratic primary election, 2024
Party	Candidate	Votes	%
Democratic	Diane Sullivan	3,041	61.43%
Democratic	Scott Savage	1,909	38.57%
Total votes		4,950	100%

Nevada State Assembly 26th district general election, 2024
Party	Candidate	Votes	%
Republican	Rich DeLong (incumbent	28,925	60.69%
Democratic	Diane Sullivan	18,733	39.31%
Total votes		47,658	100%

=== District 27 ===
Incumbent Democrat Angie Taylor has represented the district since 2022.

Nevada State Assembly 27th district Democratic primary election, 2024
Party	Candidate	Votes	%
Democratic	Heather Goulding	2,263	56.20%
Democratic	Alex Velto	1,764	43.80%
Total votes		4,027	100%

Nevada State Assembly 27th district general election, 2024
Party	Candidate	Votes	%
Democratic	Heather Goulding	17,495	55.79%
Republican	Carmen Ortiz	13,866	44.21%
Total votes		31,361	100%

=== District 28 ===
Incumbent Democrat Reuben D'Silva has represented the district since 2022.

Nevada State Assembly 28th district general election, 2024
Party	Candidate	Votes	%
Democratic	Reuben D'Silva (incumbent)	13,165	100%
Total votes		13,165	100%

=== District 29 ===
Incumbent Democrat Lesley Cohen has represented the district since 2016.

Nevada State Assembly 29th district Republican primary election, 2024
Party	Candidate	Votes	%
Republican	Annette Dawson Owens	2,132	81.97%
Republican	Yadusha Williams	469	18.03%
Total votes		2,601	100%

Nevada State Assembly 29th district general election, 2024
Party	Candidate	Votes	%
Democratic	Joe Dalia	17,766	52.15%
Republican	Annette Dawson Owens	16,298	47.85%
Total votes		34,064	100%

=== District 30 ===
Incumbent Democrat Natha Anderson has represented the district since 2020.

Nevada State Assembly 30th district general election, 2024
Party	Candidate	Votes	%
Democratic	Natha Anderson (incumbent)	20,129	100%
Total votes		20,129	100%

=== District 31 ===
Incumbent Republican Jill Dickman has represented the district since 2020.

Nevada State Assembly 31st district general election, 2024
Party	Candidate	Votes	%
Republican	Jill Dickman (incumbent)	28,004	62.73%
Democratic	Stuart MacKie	16,637	37.27%
Total votes		44,641	100%

=== District 32 ===
Incumbent Republican Alexis Hansen has represented the district since 2018.

Nevada State Assembly 32nd district Republican primary election, 2024
Party	Candidate	Votes	%
Republican	Alexis Hansen (incumbent)	5,317	75.00%
Republican	Jason Bushey	1,772	25.00%
Total votes		7,089	100%

Nevada State Assembly 32nd district general election, 2024
Party	Candidate	Votes	%
Republican	Alexis Hansen (incumbent)	25,618	70.16%
Democratic	Arnold Thomas	10,898	29.84%
Total votes		36,516	100%

=== District 33 ===
Incumbent Republican Bert Gurr has represented the district since 2022.

Nevada State Assembly 33rd district general election, 2024
Party	Candidate	Votes	%
Republican	Bert Gurr (incumbent)	26,494	84.10%
Libertarian	Darryl Baber	5,009	15.90%
Total votes		31,503	100%

=== District 34 ===
Incumbent Democrat Shannon Bilbray-Axelrod has represented the district since 2016.

Nevada State Assembly 34th district Republican primary election, 2024
Party	Candidate	Votes	%
Republican	Brandon Davis	2,361	89.60%
Republican	Clement Matthew Ziroli III	274	10.40%
Total votes		2,635	100%

Nevada State Assembly 34th district general election, 2024
Party	Candidate	Votes	%
Democratic	Hanadi Nadeem	16,452	53.25%
Republican	Brandon Davis	14,441	46.75%
Total votes		30,893	100%

=== District 35 ===
Incumbent Democrat Michelle Gorelow has represented the district since 2018.

Nevada State Assembly 35th district general election, 2024
Party	Candidate	Votes	%
Republican	Rebecca Edgeworth	21,140	54.32%
Democratic	Sharifa Wahab	17,774	45.68%
Total votes		38,914	100%
Republican gain from Democratic			

=== District 36 ===
Incumbent Republican Gregory Hafen II has represented the district since 2018.

Nevada State Assembly 36th district general election, 2024
Party	Candidate	Votes	%
Republican	Gregory Hafen II (incumbent)	29,196	63.63%
Democratic	Marlene Drake	16,689	36.37%
Total votes		45,885	100%

=== District 37 ===
Incumbent Democrat Shea Backus has represented the district since 2022.

Nevada State Assembly 37th district general election, 2024
Party	Candidate	Votes	%
Democratic	Shea Backus (incumbent)	20,907	51.31%
Republican	David Brog	19,843	48.69%
Total votes		40,750	100%

=== District 38 ===
Incumbent Republican Gregory Koenig has represented the district since 2022.

Nevada State Assembly 38th district general election, 2024
Party	Candidate	Votes	%
Republican	Gregory Koenig (incumbent)	31,207	100%
Total votes		31,207	100%

=== District 39 ===
Incumbent Republican Ken Gray has represented the district since 2022.

Nevada State Assembly 39th district general election, 2024
Party	Candidate	Votes	%
Republican	Ken Gray (incumbent)	33,461	71.49%
Democratic	Erich Obermayr	13,347	28.51%
Total votes		46,808	100%

=== District 40 ===
Incumbent Republican P. K. O'Neill has represented the district since 2020.

Nevada State Assembly 40th district Republican primary election, 2024
Party	Candidate	Votes	%
Republican	P. K. O'Neill (incumbent)	6,082	77.71%
Republican	Drew Ribar	1,745	22.29%
Total votes		7,827	100%

Nevada State Assembly 40th district general election, 2024
Party	Candidate	Votes	%
Republican	P. K. O'Neill (incumbent)	24,956	61.29%
Democratic	Katherine Ramsey	15,764	38.71%
Total votes		40,720	100%

=== District 41 ===
Incumbent Democrat Sandra Jauregui has represented the district since 2016.

Nevada State Assembly 41st district Republican primary election, 2024
Party	Candidate	Votes	%
Republican	Rafael Arroyo-Montalvo	1,693	70.45%
Republican	Guadalupe Reyes	710	29.55%
Total votes		2,403	100%

Nevada State Assembly 41st district general election, 2024
Party	Candidate	Votes	%
Democratic	Sandra Jauregui (incumbent)	18,094	50.36%
Republican	Rafael Arroyo-Montalvo	17,837	49.64%
Total votes		35,931	100%

=== District 42 ===
Incumbent Democrat Tracy Brown-May has represented the district since 2021.

Nevada State Assembly 42nd district Democratic primary election, 2024
Party	Candidate	Votes	%
Democratic	Tracy Brown-May (incumbent)	2,475	87.70%
Democratic	Sayed Ziadi	347	12.30%
Total votes		2,822	100%

Nevada State Assembly 42nd district Republican primary election, 2024
Party	Candidate	Votes	%
Republican	Kevin L. Child	1,106	57.85%
Republican	Katrin Ivanoff	806	42.15%
Total votes		1,912	100%

Nevada State Assembly 42nd district general election, 2024
Party	Candidate	Votes	%
Democratic	Tracy Brown-May (incumbent)	16,222	55.44%
Republican	Kevin L. Child	13,036	44.56%
Total votes		29,258	100%

== See also ==
- 2024 Nevada elections
- List of Nevada state legislatures
