= 2026 Nevada Assembly election =

- November 3, 2026

All 42 seats in the Nevada Assembly 22 seats needed for a majority
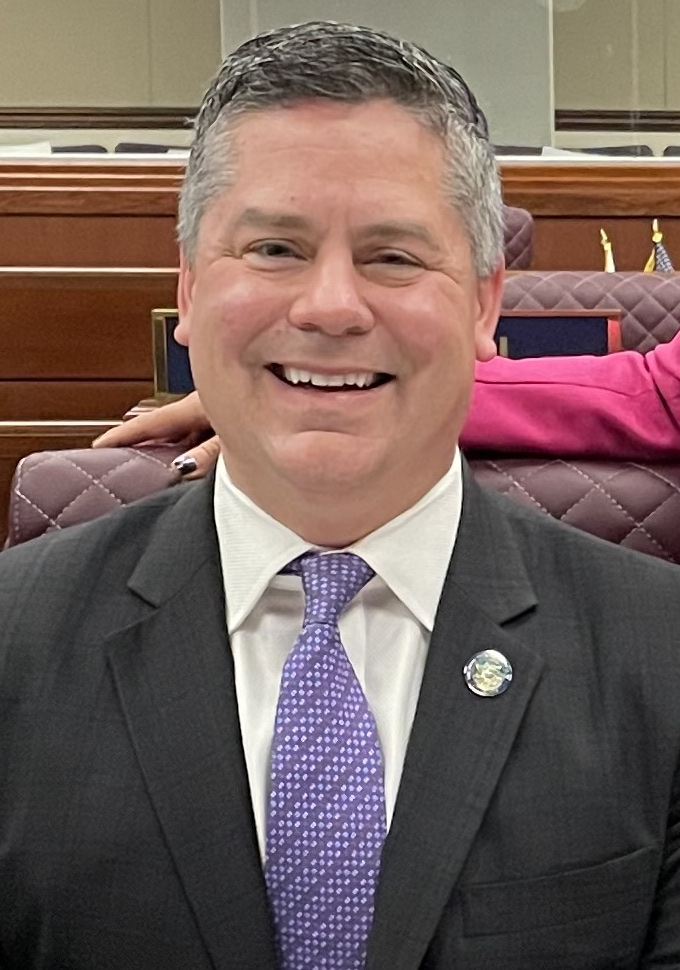

	Majority party	Minority party
Leader	Steve Yeager (retiring)	Gregory Hafen II
Party	Democratic	Republican
Leader since	February 6, 2023	February 3, 2025
Leader's seat	9th	36th
Last election	27	15
Seats won	32	10
Seat change	▲5	▼5
- Democratic incumbent Democratic incumbent retiring Republican incumbent Republican incumbent retiring Vacant
Speaker of the Nevada Assembly before election
Steve Yeager
Democratic
Elected Speaker of the Nevada Assembly
TBD

The 2026 Nevada Assembly election was held on November 3, 2026, alongside the other 2026 United States elections. It was held with the 2026 Nevada Senate election. Voters elected members of the Nevada Assembly in all 42 of the U.S. state of Nevada's legislative districts to serve a two-year term.

== Retirements ==
=== Democratic ===
- District 1: Daniele Monroe-Moreno is retiring to run for mayor of North Las Vegas.
- District 9: Steve Yeager is retiring.
- District 29: Joe Dalia is retiring to run for treasurer.
- District 41: Sandra Jauregui is retiring to run for Lieutenant-governor.

=== Republican ===
- District 2: Heidi Kasama is retiring to run for the Clark County Commission.
- District 40: P. K. O'Neill is retiring.

== Predictions ==
Source	Ranking	As of
Sabato's Crystal Ball	Safe D	January 22, 2026
State Navigate	Safe D	October 24, 2026

== District 1 ==
The incumbent Democrat Daniele Monroe-Moreno, who was re-elected with 56.18% of the vote in 2024, is retiring.

=== Democratic primary ===
==== Candidates ====
===== Declared =====
- Jo Cato, Small business owner
- James Fennell Jr
- Alexis Esparza, union organizer
- Millan Gledhill
- Louis "Big Lou" DeSalvio, union president

Results

Democratic primary results - Nevada Assembly District 1
Party	Candidate	Votes	%
Democratic	Alexis Esparaza	2,635	44.10
Democratic	Jo Cato	1,882	31.50
Democratic	Millan Gledhill	532	8.90
Democrat	Louis "Big Lou" Desalvio	572	9.57
Democrat	James Fennell Jr	354	5.92
Total		5,975	100

=== Independents ===
==== Candidates ====
===== Declared =====
- Tarik Alan Barnes

== District 2 ==
The incumbent Republican Heidi Kasama who was re-elected with 55.87% of the vote in 2024, is retiring.

=== Republican primary ===
==== Candidates ====
===== Declared =====
- Drew Teitelbaum

=== Democratic primary ===
==== Candidates ====
===== Declared =====
- Kamilah Bywaters, member of the Clark County School District Board of Trustees
- Mike Kung

Results

Democratic primary results - Nevada Assembly District 2
Party	Candidate	Votes	%
Democratic	Kamilah Bywaters	2,830	58.62
Democrat	Mike Kung	1,998	41.38
Total		4,828	100

== District 3 ==
The Incumbent Democrat Selena Torres has represented the district since 2018, she was re-elected with 56.03% of the vote in 2024, she is running for re-election.

=== Democratic primary ===
==== Candidates ====
===== Declared =====
- Selena Torres, incumbent assembly member (2018-present)

=== Republican primary ===
==== Candidates ====
===== Declared =====
- Harold Erbacher
- Joseph P. Silvestri, 2012 Libertarian candidate for the 4th congressional district

Results

Republican primary results - Nevada Assembly District 3
Party	Candidate	Votes	%
Republican	Joseph P. Silvestri	1,423	63.13
Republican	Harold Erbacher	831	36.87
Total		2,254	100

== District 4 ==
The Incumbent Republican Lisa Cole has represented the district since 2024, she was elected with 54.38% of the vote in 2024, she is running for re-election.

=== Republican primary ===
==== Candidates ====
===== Declared =====
- Lisa Cole, incumbent assembly member (2024-present)

=== Democratic primary ===
==== Candidates ====
===== Declared =====
- Eileen Eady, candidate for the Clark County School District Board of Trustees in 2024 and 2018

== District 5 ==
The Incumbent Democrat Brittney Miller has represented the district since 2016, she was re-elected with 50.85% of the vote in 2024, she is running for re-election.

=== Democratic primary ===
==== Candidates ====
===== Declared =====
- Brittney Miller, incumbent assembly member (2016-present)

=== Republican primary ===
==== Candidates ====
===== Declared =====
- Kelly Quinn
- Joshua Dowden

Results

Republican primary results - Nevada Assembly District 5
Party	Candidate	Votes	%
Republican	Kelly Quinn	2,136	74.58
Republican	Joshua Dowden	728	25.42
Total		2,864	100

== District 6 ==
The Incumbent Democrat Jovan Jackson has represented the district since 2024, he was elected with 69.91% of the vote in 2024, he is running for re-election.

=== Democratic primary ===
==== Candidates ====
===== Declared =====
- Jovan Jackson, incumbent assembly member (2024-present)
- Douglas B. Candido, Jr.

Results

Democratic primary results - Nevada Assembly District 6
Party	Candidate	Votes	%
Democratic	Jovan Jackson	2,444	70.92
Democratic	Douglas Candido	1,002	29.08
Total		3,446	100

=== Independents ===
==== Candidates ====
===== Declared =====
- Katherine Duncan

== District 7 ==
Incumbent Democrat Tanya Flanagan, who was first elected unopposed in 2024, is retiring.

=== Democratic primary ===
==== Candidates ====
===== Declared =====
- Cameron Miller, former assemblymember for this district (2020–2023)

=== Independents and third-party candidates ===
==== Candidates ====
===== Declared =====
- Michael Musick (Independent)
- Anthony Willett (Libertarian)

== District 8 ==
The Incumbent Democrat Duy Nguyen has represented the district since 2022, he was re-elected with 53.58% of the vote in 2024, he is running for re-election.

=== Democratic primary ===
==== Candidates ====
===== Declared =====
- Duy Nguyen, incumbent assembly member (2022-present)
- Paul John Cook Sr.

Results

Democratic primary results - Nevada Assembly District 8
Party	Candidate	Votes	%
Democratic	Duy Nguyen (Incumbent)	3,353	82.02
Democratic	Paul John Cook Sr.	735	17.98
Total		4,088	100

=== Republican primary ===
==== Candidates ====
===== Declared =====
- David Farrakhan
- Joseph "Joey" Charafi, small-business owner

Results

Republican primary results - Nevada Assembly District 8
Party	Candidate	Votes	%
Republican	Joseph "Joey" Charafi	1,437	70.72
Republican	David Farrakhan	595	29.28
Total		2,032	100

== District 9 ==
The incumbent Democrat Steve Yeager, who was re-elected with 51.11% of the vote in 2024, is retiring.

=== Democratic primary ===
==== Candidates ====
===== Declared =====
- Maria Teresa Hank
- Ryan Hampton, nonprofit founder and nominee for 4th district in 2024

Results

Democratic primary results - Nevada Assembly District 9
Party	Candidate	Votes	%
Democratic	Ryan Hampton	2,437	58.55
Democratic	Maria Teresa Hank	1,725	41.45
Total		4,162	100

=== Republican primary ===
==== Candidates ====
===== Declared =====
- Cristhian Orozco
- Erica Alejandra Neely

Results

Republican primary results - Nevada Assembly District 9
Party	Candidate	Votes	%
Republican	Erica Alejandra Neely	2,237	79.72
Republican	Cristhian Orozco	569	20.28
Total		2,806	100

== District 10 ==
=== Democratic primary ===
==== Declared ====
- Venise Karris, incumbent assembly member (2024-present)
- Val Thomason

Results

Democratic primary results - Nevada Assembly District 10
Party	Candidate	Votes	%
Democratic	Venise Karris (Incumbent)	2,149	62.78
Democratic	Val Thomason	1,274	37.22
Total		3,423	100

== District 15 ==
=== Declared ===
- Howard Watts, incumbent assembly member (2018-present)
- Miguel Dávila

=== Results ===
Democratic primary results - Nevada Assembly District 15
Party	Candidate	Votes	%
Democratic	Miguel Davila	1,369	50.80
Democratic	Howard Watts (Incumbent)	1,326	49.20
Total		2,695	100

== District 16 ==
=== Declared ===
- Cecelia Gonzalez, incumbent assembly member (2020-present)
- Eva Olivia Chase

=== Results ===
Democratic primary results - Nevada Assembly District 16
Party	Candidate	Votes	%
Democratic	Cecelia Gonzalez (incumbent)	2,218	74.55
Democratic	Eva Olivia Chase	757	25.45
Total		2,975	100

== District 17 ==
=== Democratic primary ===
==== Declared ====
- Linda F. Hunt, incumbent assembly member (2024-present)
- Robert "RC" Smith

==== Results ====
Democratic primary results - Nevada Assembly District 17
Party	Candidate	Votes	%
Democratic	Linda F. Hunt (incumbent)	4,1348	87.83
Democratic	Robert "RC" Smith	573	12.17
Total		4,707	100

== District 18 ==
=== Declared ===
- Venicia Considine, incumbent assembly member (2020-present)
- Antario "Iron Tiger" Brown

=== Results ===
Democratic primary results - Nevada Assembly District 18
Party	Candidate	Votes	%
Democratic	Venicia Considine (incumbent)	2,896	80.29
Democratic	Antario "Iron Tiger" Brown	711	19.71
Total		3,607	100

== District 19 ==
=== Declared ===
- Jason Patchett, incumbent assembly member (2025-Present)
- Amy Groves

=== Results ===
Republican primary results - Nevada Assembly District 19
Party	Candidate	Votes	%
Republican	Jason Patchett (incumbent)	5,706	72.34
Republican	Amy Groves	2,182	27.66
Total		7,888	100

== District 20 ==
=== Declared ===
- David Orentlicher, incumbent assembly member (2020-Present)
- Tony T. Smith

=== Results ===
Democratic primary results - Nevada Assembly District 20
Party	Candidate	Votes	%
Democratic	David Orentlicher (incumbent)	2,524	71.34
Democratic	Tony T. Smith	1,014	28.66
Total		3,538	100

== District 22 ==
=== Declared ===
- Shenea Booth
- Dionisio C. "Daniel" Hernandez
- Tamara N. Taylor

=== Results ===
Democratic primary results - Nevada Assembly District 22
Party	Candidate	Votes	%
Democratic	Shenea Booth	2,784	51.25
Democratic	Tamara N. Taylor	1,901	35.00
Democratic	Dionisio C. "Daniel" Hernandez	747	13.75
Total		5,432	100

== District 25 ==
=== Declared ===
- Noah R. Bachman Dodge
- Michael A. Ginsburg

=== Results ===
Republican primary results - Nevada Assembly District 25
Party	Candidate	Votes	%
Republican	Michael A. Ginsburg	5,593	87.90
Republican	Noah R. Bachman Dodge	770	12.10
Total		6,363	100

== District 29 ==
The incumbent Democrat Joe Dalia, who was elected with 52.15% of the vote in 2024, is retiring.

=== Democratic primary ===
==== Candidates ====
===== Declared =====
- Ashley Delobel
- Alex Pereszlenyi
- Bradley Combs

Results

Democratic primary results - Nevada Assembly District 29
Party	Candidate	Votes	%
Democratic	Alex Pereszlenyi	1,783	37.96
Democratic	Ashley Delobel	1,528	32.53
Democratic	Brad Combs	1,386	29.51
Total		4,697	100

=== Republican primary ===
==== Candidates ====
===== Declared =====
- Joe Ludwig

=== Libertarian primary ===
==== Candidates ====
===== Declared =====
- Kathryn Nix

== District 34 ==
=== Declared ===
- Hanadi Nadeem, incumbent assembly member (2024-Present)
- Shaun R. Navarro

=== Results ===
Democratic primary results - Nevada Assembly District 34
Party	Candidate	Votes	%
Democratic	Hanadi Nadeem (incumbent)	2,433	60.21
Democratic	Shaun R. Navarro	1,608	39.79
Total		4,041	100

== District 39 ==
=== Declared ===
- Blayne Osborn, incumbent assembly member (2025-Present)
- Brianna S. Cowan
- Ken Gray, former assembly member for District 39 (stepped down in 2025)
- Bridget Peterson

=== Results ===
Republican primary results - Nevada Assembly District 39
Party	Candidate	Votes	%
Republican	Blayne Osborn (incumbent)	7,479	51.50
Republican	Ken Gray	4,586	31.58
Republican	Brianna S. Cowan	1,782	12.27
Republican	Bridget Peterson	676	4.65
Total		6,363	100

== District 40 ==
The incumbent Republican P. K. O'Neill, who was re-elected with 61.29% of the vote in 2024, is retiring.

=== Republican primary ===
==== Candidates ====
===== Declared =====
- Julie Butler, former director of the Nevada Department of Motor Vehicles
- Drew Ribar, candidate for this district in 2024
- Stacy Woodbury
- Rich Harvey

Results

Republican primary results - Nevada Assembly District 40
Party	Candidate	Votes	%
Republican	Julie Butler	4,396	48.38
Republican	Stacy Woodbury	2,595	28.56
Republican	Drew Ribar	1,210	13.32
Republican	Rich Harvey	885	9.74
Total		9,086	100

=== Democratic primary ===
==== Candidates ====
===== Declared =====
- Oscar Fuentes

== District 41 ==
The incumbent assembly member, Democrat Sandra Jauregui, is running for lieutenant governor.

=== Declared ===
- Spencer L. Ridenour
- Vinny Spotleson
- Gabriela Wyett

=== Results ===
Democratic primary results - Nevada Assembly District 41
Party	Candidate	Votes	%
Democratic	Vinny Spotleson	1,820	43.35
Democratic	Gabriela Wyett	1,728	41.16
Democratic	Spencer L. Ridenour	650	15.48
Total		4,198	100

=== Declared ===
- Tofuola "Tofu" Alofipo
- Kelly Chapman

=== Results ===
Republican primary results - Nevada Assembly District 41
Party	Candidate	Votes	%
Republican	Kelly Chapman	1,471	53.67
Republican	Tofuola "Tofu" Alofipo	1,270	46.33
Total		2,741	100

== District 42 ==
=== Declared ===
- Tracy Brown-May, incumbent assembly member (2021-Present)
- Dayton Vasquez

=== Results ===
Democratic primary results - Nevada Assembly District 41
Party	Candidate	Votes	%
Democratic	Tracy Brown-May (incumbent)	2,681	72.61
Democratic	Dayton Vasquez	1,011	27.38
Total		3,692	100

=== Declared ===
- Christopher Brandlin
- Katrin "Mrs. Fix It" Ivanoff

=== Results ===
Republican primary results - Nevada Assembly District 42
Party	Candidate	Votes	%
Republican	Christopher Brandlin	1,303	59.01
Republican	Katrin "Mrs. Fix It" Ivanoff	905	40.99
Total		2,208	100
