= Southeast Career Technical Academy =

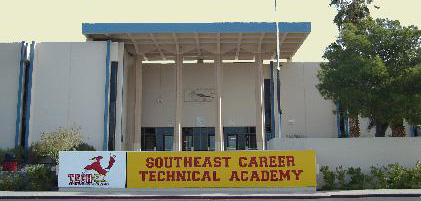
- SECTA Main Entrance

Location
- 5710 Mountain Vista Street; Las Vegas, NV, 89120; 36.08153°N 115.06878°W

Information
- School type: Magnet public high school
- Motto: "We Build Futures"
- Established: 1966
- School district: Clark County School District
- President: Berniz Calacsan
- Principal: Isabelle Sanchez Ager
- Teaching staff: 97.00 (FTE)
- Grades: 9-12
- Enrollment: 2,006 (2022-2023)
- Student to teacher ratio: 20.68
- Colours: Red, yellow, and white
- Athletics conference: Mountain 4A Region
- Team name: Roadrunners
- Publication: Gazette
- Website: secta.us

The Southeast Career Technical Academy (SECTA or Southeast Tech) is a magnet public high school in Las Vegas, Nevada. Opened as the Southern Nevada Vocational Technical Center in 1966, it was the first public educational institution of its kind launched by the Clark County School District. Its name was changed before the start of the 2007-2008 school year.

== About ==
SECTA is a four-year comprehensive high school accredited by the Northwest Accreditation Commission, designed to offer career technical training programs with an academic curriculum. It is located on top of the Whitney Mesa Nature Preserve, which is right next to Thurman White Middle School. It is one of eight career technical academies in Las Vegas.

== Majors offered ==
The academic majors include:

Advanced Manufacturing
Architectural Design
Automotive Technology
Construction Technology
Cosmetology
Culinary Arts
Cybersecurity
Digital Game Development
Medical Professions
Multimedia Communications
Sports Medicine
Teaching and Training

== Extracurricular activities ==
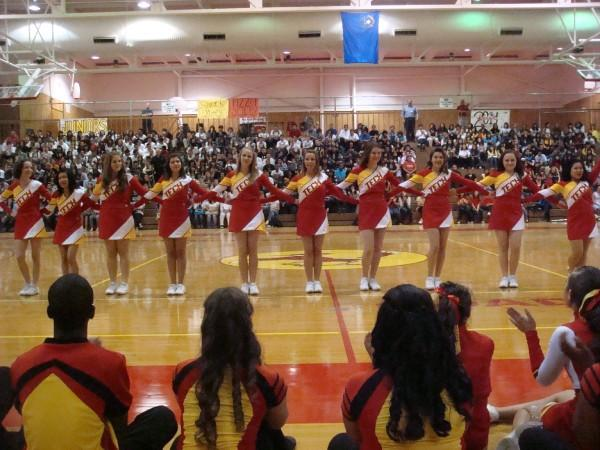
Cheerleaders at an Assembly

SECTA students won 13 Gold, 24 Silver, and 19 Bronze Medals in the 2012 SkillsUSA State Competition. It has the most College of Southern Nevada Tech Prep College Credits garnered in the state in 2011.

The school mascot is the Roadrunners. It competes in the Southeast Division of the Sunrise 4A Region in every sport sponsored by the Nevada Interscholastic Activities Association with the exceptions of football, track and field, and wrestling. In 2012, SECTA won the Nevada State titles in Men's Bowling, Men's Soccer, and Men's Volleyball. The school also fields swimming, basketball, and baseball teams.

SECTA is also the home to FIRST Robotics team 7426, Pair of Dice, founded in 2019. FIRST Robotics inspires students worldwide to dream big and tackle real-world challenges through STEM education. As part of this global movement, Pair of Dice Robotics combines engineering, programming, and creativity to compete and grow as future innovators and leaders. They won the 2025 Utah Regionals with team 987 and 3166, along with the Engineering Inspiration award at the Ventura Regional.

== Alumni ==
- Cameron Miller, member of the Nevada Assembly
- Kevin Rose, former partner at Google Ventures
- Rolando Romero, former WBA super lightweight champion
