= Ellen Koivisto =

American politician

Member of the Nevada State Assembly from the 14th district
- In office November 6, 1996 – November 3, 2010
- Succeeded by: Maggie Carlton

Personal details
- Born: August 11, 1943 (age 83) Morris, Minnesota
- Party: Democratic

Ellen Koivisto (born August 11, 1943) is an American politician who served in the Nevada State Assembly from the 14th district from 1996 to 2010.
