= Heidi Gansert =

American politician

Minority Leader of the Nevada Senate
- In office February 6, 2023 – January 17, 2024
- Preceded by: James Settelmeyer
- Succeeded by: Robin L. Titus

Member of the Nevada Senate from the 15th district
- In office November 9, 2016 – November 6, 2024
- Preceded by: Jesse Haw
- Succeeded by: Angie Taylor

Member of the Nevada Assembly from the 25th district
- In office November 3, 2004 – November 3, 2010
- Preceded by: Dawn Gibbons
- Succeeded by: Patrick Hickey

Personal details
- Born: Heidi Seevers; 1963 (age 62–63) Reno, Nevada, U.S.
- Party: Republican
- Children: 4
- Education: Santa Clara University (BS); University of Nevada, Reno (MBA)

Heidi K. Seevers Gansert (born 1963) is an American politician, businessperson, and engineer from the state of Nevada who served in the Nevada Senate, representing the 15th district from 2016 to 2024. She served in the Nevada Assembly from 2004 through 2010, including as Republican leader, and as chief of staff to Governor Brian Sandoval from 2011 through 2012. She is a Republican.

== Early life ==
Gansert graduated from Bishop Manogue High School in Reno, Nevada, in 1981. She earned a Bachelor of Science in engineering from Santa Clara University and a Master of Business Administration from University of Nevada, Reno. Gansert worked as a management consultant for medical firms and a resource planning engineer for NV Energy.

== Career ==
Gansert was elected to the Nevada Assembly in 2004, representing District 25 (part of Washoe County). She became assistant minority leader in 2007 and minority leader in 2009. Gansert opted not to seek reelection in the 2010 elections.

When Brian Sandoval, a childhood friend, won the 2010 election to become Governor of Nevada, Gansert led his transition team and became his chief of staff. She resigned from the governor's office in August 2012 and was hired by the University of Nevada, Reno as a special assistant for external affairs in October 2012.

Gansert was elected to the Nevada Senate in the 2016 elections, representing southwestern Washoe County. Her Republican colleagues chose her to be the minority leader of the senate in November 2022. In August 2023, Gansert announced that she would not seek reelection in 2024.

== Political positions ==
Gansert has displayed a mix of moderate and conservative policy positions during her time in public office. For instance, in 2017 Gansert voted for a budget compromise worked out between Republican Governor Sandoval and the Democratic leadership of the Legislature, despite strong conservative criticism at the imposition of a tax on marijuana and a lack of funding for private schools. However, Gansert has also displayed conservative positions, such as her opposition to the decriminalization of abortion in Nevada, on the grounds that the parental notification requirement and other restrictions should remain in place.

== Personal life ==
Gansert participates in marathons and triathlons.

== Elections ==
- 2016 After Republican incumbent Greg Brower's resignation, Gansert won the Republican primary election for Senate District 15 with 5,105 votes (56.91%) against Eugene Hoover. Gansert won the general election with 33,822 votes (52.96%) against Democratic nominee Devon Reese and another candidate.
- 2008 Gansert was unopposed in the primary and won the general election with 19,680 votes (60.16%) against Democratic nominee Robert Townsend.
- 2006 Gansert was unopposed in both the primary and general elections.
- 2004 After Republican incumbent Dawn Gibbons left the Assembly in order to run for Congress, Gansert won the Republican primary election for Assembly District 25 with 4,724 votes (59.32%) against Robin Levy and another candidate. Gansert then won the general election with 19,167 votes (66.58%) against Democratic nominee Dan Meyer.

Nevada Senate
Preceded by James Settelmeyer	Minority Leader of the Nevada Senate; 2023–2024	Succeeded by Robin L. Titus
