= Nevada's 15th Senate district =

American legislative district

Nevada's 15th State Senate district
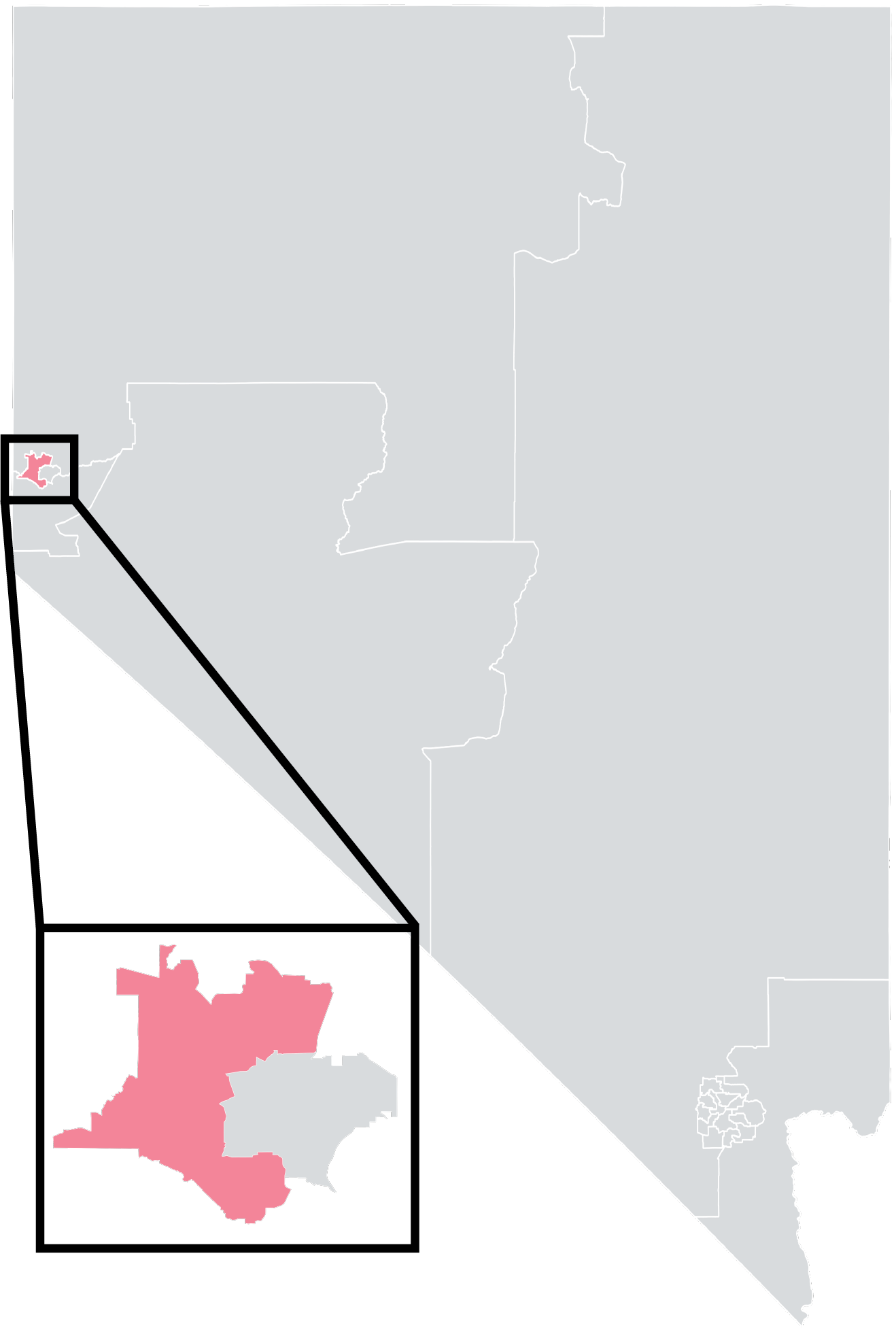
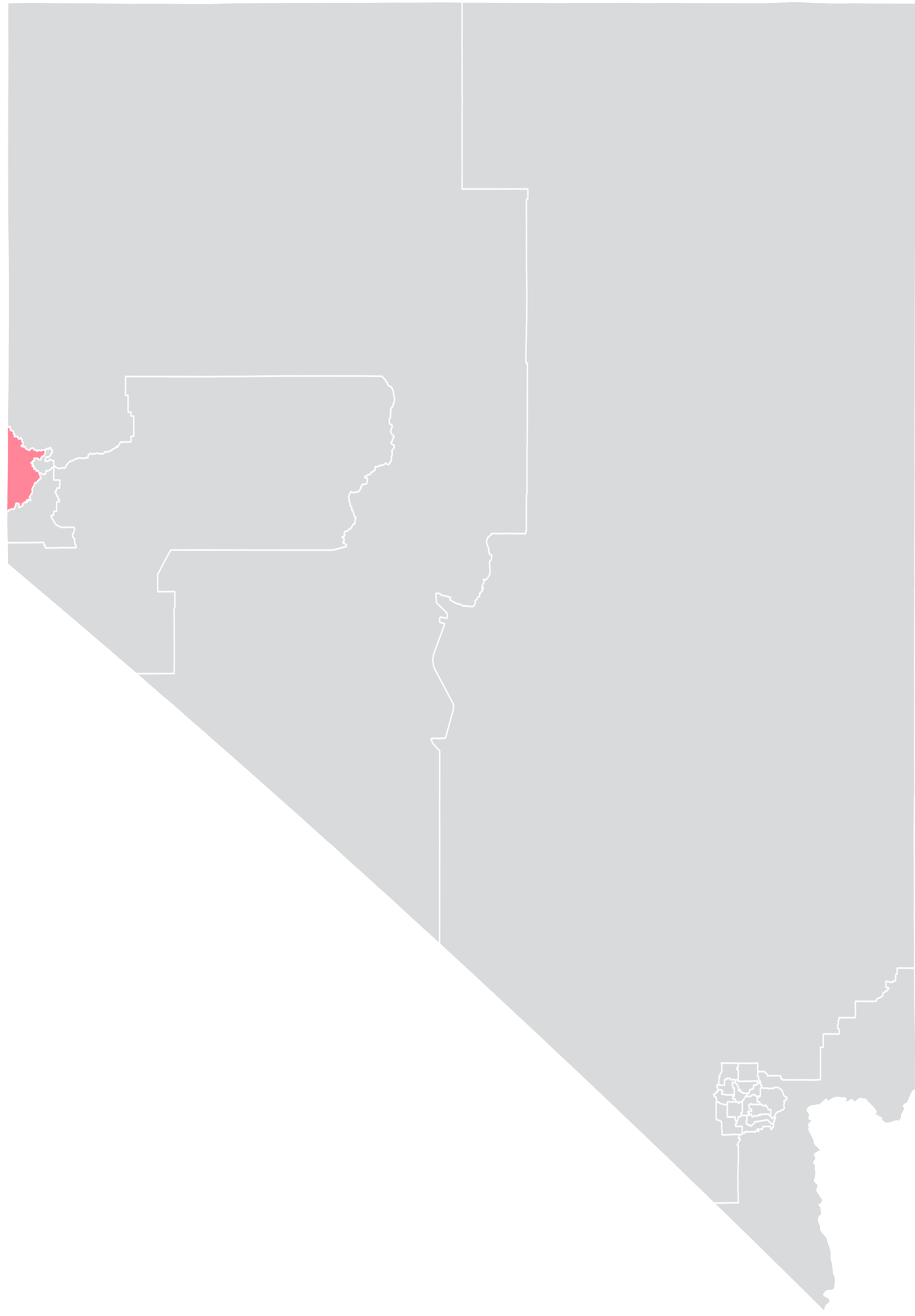
Senator
| Angie Taylor; D–Reno |
- Registration: 39.4% Republican; 38.7% Democratic; 15.7% No party preference
- Demographics: 69% White; 2% Black; 19% Hispanic; 5% Asian; 1% Native American; 3% Other
- Population (2018): 134,271
- Registered voters: 79,577

Nevada's 15th Senate district is one of 21 districts in the Nevada Senate. It has been represented by Democrat Angie Taylor since 2024, succeeding Republican Heidi Gansert.

== Geography ==
District 15 is based in southwestern Washoe County, taking in parts of western Reno and its surrounding suburbs, including Sun Valley, Cold Springs, Mogul, and Verdi.

The district is located entirely within Nevada's 2nd congressional district, and overlaps with the 25th and 27th districts of the Nevada Assembly. It borders the state of California.

== Recent election results ==
Nevada Senators are elected to staggered four-year terms; since 2012 redistricting, the 15th district has held elections in presidential years.

=== 2024 ===
2024 Nevada State Senate election, District 15
| Party | Candidate | Votes | % |
|---|---|---|---|
| Democratic | Angie Taylor | 39,755 | 54.94 |
| Republican | Mike Ginsburg | 32,607 | 45.06 |
| Democratic gain from Republican | | | |
| Total votes | | 72,362 | 100 |

=== 2020 ===
2020 Nevada State Senate election, District 15
| Party | Candidate | Votes | % |
|---|---|---|---|
| Republican | Heidi Gansert (incumbent) | 39,325 | 51.8 |
| Democratic | Wendy Jauregui-Jackins | 36,605 | 48.2 |
| Total votes | | 75,930 | 100 |
| Republican hold | | | |

=== 2016 ===
2016 Nevada State Senate election, District 15
Primary election
| Party | Candidate | Votes | % |
|---|---|---|---|
| Republican | Heidi Gansert | 5,105 | 56.9 |
| Republican | Eugene Hoover | 3,866 | 43.1 |
| Total votes | | 8,971 | 100 |
General election
| Republican | Heidi Gansert | 33,822 | 53.0 |
| Democratic | Devon Reese | 26,773 | 41.9 |
| Libertarian | David Colborne | 3,266 | 5.1 |
| Total votes | | 63,861 | 100 |
| Republican hold | | | |

=== 2012 ===
2012 Nevada State Senate election, District 15
| Party | Candidate | Votes | % |
|---|---|---|---|
| Republican | Greg Brower (incumbent) | 29,352 | 50.2 |
| Democratic | Sheila Leslie | 29,086 | 49.8 |
| Total votes | | 58,438 | 100 |
| Republican hold | | | |

=== Federal and statewide results ===
| Year | Office | Results |
|---|---|---|
| 2024 | President | Trump 54.9 – 42.6% |
| 2020 | President | Biden 52.3 – 44.6% |
| 2018 | Senate | Rosen 51.3 – 45.0% |
| 2018 | Governor | Sisolak 50.3 – 45.0% |
| 2016 | President | Clinton 47.1 – 44.3% |
| 2012 | President | Obama 50.9 – 47.0% |
| 2012 | Senate | Heller 50.4 – 40.0% |
