= Ryan Hampton =

Ryan Hampton may refer to:

- Ryan Hampton (racing driver)
- Ryan Hampton (writer)
