= Maggie Carlton =

American politician

Member of the Nevada Assembly from the 14th district
- In office November 3, 2010 – November 9, 2022
- Preceded by: Ellen Koivisto
- Succeeded by: Erica Mosca

Member of the Nevada Senate from the Clark 2 district
- In office November 6, 1998 – November 3, 2010
- Succeeded by: Mo Denis

Personal details
- Born: July 24, 1957 (age 68) St. Louis, Missouri, U.S.
- Party: Democratic
- Spouse: Merritt

Maggie Carlton (born July 24, 1957) is an American politician who served as a member of the Nevada Assembly. She represents District 14, which includes a portion of Las Vegas. Carlton previously served in the Nevada Senate, representing Clark County District 2 from 1998 to 2010.

Carlton previously served as a shop steward for the Culinary Workers Union at the Treasure Island Hotel and Casino.
