= Tanya Flanagan =

American politician from Nevada

Member of the Nevada Assembly from the 7th district
- Incumbent
- Assumed office November 6, 2024
- Preceded by: Cameron Miller

Personal details
- Party: Democratic
- Website: votetanyaflanagan.com

Tanya P. Flanagan is an American politician. She has been a member of the Nevada Assembly since 2024. A member of the Democratic Party, she was elected in the 2024 Nevada Assembly election. In 2020, she ran for Clark County Commission in District D. Flanagan is a breast cancer survivor. Her experiences encouraged her to become a healthcare advocate.

Flanagan declined to run for re-election in 2026.
