= Susie Martinez =

American politician (born 1966)

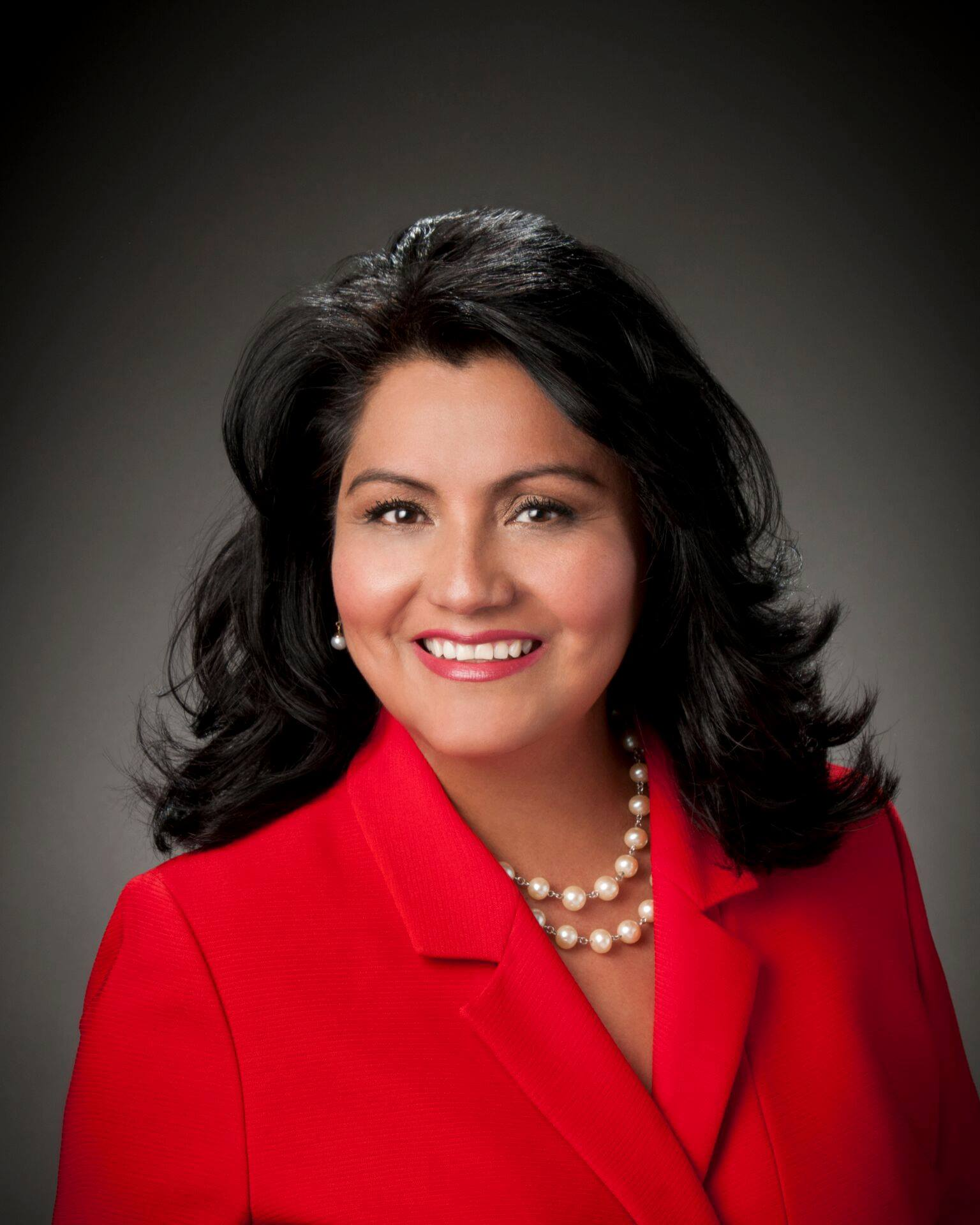

Member of the Nevada Assembly from the 12th district
- In office November 6, 2018 – November 8, 2022
- Preceded by: James Ohrenschall
- Succeeded by: Max Carter II

Personal details
- Born: 1966 (age 59–60) Las Vegas, Nevada, U.S.
- Party: Democratic
- Education: College of Southern Nevada
- Profession: Union Leader
- Website: nv.aflcio.org/about-us/susiemartinez

Susan Martinez (born 1966) is an American union leader and former politician. A Democrat, she served in the Nevada State Assembly from 2018 to 2022, representing Nevada Assembly District 12. Upon her election as the Executive Secretary Treasurer of the Nevada State AFL-CIO, Martinez announced that she would not seek re-election in the 2022 elections.

== Early life ==
Martinez's family moved to the United States in 1959. Martinez was born in 1966 in Las Vegas, Nevada.

== Education ==
Martinez graduated from Eldorado High School. Martinez majored in general education at the College of Southern Nevada.

== Career ==
Martinez worked as a guest service agent at Flamingo Las Vegas for more than 30 years. As a Teamsters Local 986 union member, Martinez served as a shop steward and advocated for her co-workers through grievance and contract negotiations to fight for stronger wages, better benefits, and safer working conditions. In 2018, Martinez was elected to the Nevada Assembly, where she represented the 12th district from November 6, 2018, until November 8, 2022. In August 2021, Martinez announced that she would not seek re-election after becoming the head of the Nevada State AFL-CIO.

== Personal life ==
Martinez has one daughter, Victoria.
