= Cinthia Zermeño Moore =

American politician from Nevada

Member of the Nevada Assembly from the 11th district
- Incumbent
- Assumed office November 6, 2024
- Preceded by: Bea Duran

Personal details
- Born: Jalisco, Mexico
- Party: Democratic
- Website: cinthiamoore.com

Cinthia Zermeño Moore is an American politician. She has been a member of the Nevada Assembly since 2024. A member of the Democratic Party, she was elected in the 2024 Nevada Assembly election. She was born in Jalisco, Mexico. Her family moved to the Las Vegas Valley over 30 years ago. She was Coordinator of the Environmental Justice Coalition.
