= Sabra Newby =

American politician from Nevada

Member of the Nevada Assembly from the 10th district
- In office February 1, 2023 – September 6, 2023
- Preceded by: Rochelle Nguyen
- Succeeded by: Venise Karris

Personal details
- Party: Democratic
- Education: Wellesley College (BA); Harvard Kennedy School (MPA)

Sabra Smith Newby is an American politician. She was a member of the Nevada Assembly. She was appointed to fill the seat vacated by Rochelle Nguyen. In September 2023, she resigned from the Legislature to serve as a Las Vegas deputy city manager. She was a vice president at the University of Nevada at Las Vegas prior to becoming a member of the Nevada Assembly.
