= Brian Hibbetts =

American politician from Nevada

Member of the Nevada Assembly from the 13th district
- In office November 9, 2022 – November 4, 2026
- Preceded by: Tom Roberts (R)
- Succeeded by: Daniel Andrews (D)

Personal details
- Born: July 1, 1974 (age 52) Las Vegas, Nevada
- Party: Republican
- Spouse: Tracy Hibbetts
- Education: Bonanza High School

Brian Hibbetts (born 1974) is a American politician and former law enforcement officer from Las Vegas, Nevada. A member of the Republican Party, he represented part of northwest Las Vegas (Kyle Canyon) as a member of the Nevada Assembly from 2022 until 2026.

While a member of the Assembly, legislation introduced by Hibbitts included Assembly Bill 232 to cap the tax of cigars and Assembly Bill 111 (Jaya's Law) to increase criminal penalties for wrong-way driving. He also co-sponored the Assembly Bill 381 (Reba's Law) to increase criminal penalties for animal abuse.

Hibbetts was defeated in the 2026 election by retired school teacher Daniel Andrews, a member of the Democratic Party. Previously, the district was considered a Republican stronghold due to having twice as many voters registered as Republican than Democrats.

Prior to public office, Hibbetts worked for the Las Vegas Metropolitan Police Department as a police officer, detective, and administrator. He retired from the department in 2021.

== Early life and career ==
Brian Hibbetts was born in Las Vegas. His father was a plumber and pipe-fitter and his mother was a nurse. His father served as a reserve deputy sheriff in San Bernardino County in California in the 1960s. In 1992, he graduated from Bonanza High School.

In 1994, he joined the Las Vegas Metropolitan Police Department and served as a patrol officer, detective investigating robbery and homicide and as sergeant specializing in intelligence collection at the interagency Southern Nevada Counter Terrorism Center. He retired from the agency in 2021.

== Nevada Assembly ==
=== Elections ===
Hibbetts was first elected to the Nevada Assembly in 2022 from the 13th district, in northwest Las Vegas. He succeeded fellow Republican Tom Roberts, who did not seek re-election and instead ran unsuccessfully for Clark County sheriff. Hibbetts won a four-way Republican primary with 31.5 percent of the vote and defeated Democrat Will Rucker in the general election, 55.6 percent to 44.4 percent. He took office on November 9, 2022.

He was re-elected in 2024, again defeating Democrat Daniel Andrews with 55.5 percent of the vote.

In 2026, Hibbetts lost his bid for a third term to Andrews, a retired mathematics teacher, in a rematch of the 2024 race. Andrews raised about $4,000 during the cycle, compared with more than $123,000 raised by Hibbetts. Registered Republicans outnumbered Democrats in the district, and The Nevada Independent had not included the seat in its list of competitive legislative races.

=== Committee assignments ===
During the 2023 session, Hibbetts served on the Assembly committees on Government Affairs; Health and Human Services; and Legislative Operations and Elections. In 2025, he served on Health and Human Services; Legislative Operations and Elections; and Ways and Means. Over his tenure he served in two regular sessions and three special sessions.

=== Legislation ===
Before his first session, Hibbetts told media that he hoped to improve K–12 education in Nevada.

In 2023, Hibbetts and Democratic Assemblyman Duy Nguyen sponsored Assembly Bill 232, which capped the state tax on premium cigars at 50 cents per cigar. Premium cigars had previously been taxed with other tobacco products at 30 percent of the wholesale price. The bill passed the Assembly 35 to 7 and the Senate 18–3, minutes before the end of the session. It was signed by Governor Joe Lombardo and took effect July 1, 2023.

In January 2025, Hibbetts prefiled Assembly Bill 111, known as "Jaya's Law." The bill was named for Jaya Brooks, a three-year-old killed on December 9, 2023, when a wrong-way driver struck her family's car on U.S. Route 95 near the Durango Drive exit, in Hibbetts's district. The bill made wrong-way driving on a divided highway a misdemeanor. Hibbetts said this reversed part of a 2021 law, AB 116, which had reclassified many traffic violations as civil infractions. The bill passed the Assembly and the Senate unanimously and was approved by the governor on May 29, 2025, as Chapter 108 of the Statutes of Nevada.

Hibbetts was also a primary sponsor, with Republican Assemblywoman Melissa Hardy, of Assembly Bill 381, known as "Reba's Law," which increased penalties for animal cruelty. It was approved by the governor on June 9, 2025, as Chapter 424.

== Personal life ==
Hibbetts and his wife, Tracy Hibbetts, live in Las Vegas.
