= Linda Hunt (politician) =

American politician from Nevada

Member of the Nevada Assembly from the 17th district
- Incumbent
- Assumed office November 6, 2024
- Preceded by: Clara Thomas

Personal details
- Party: Democratic
- Website: lindafornevada.com

Linda F. Hunt is an American politician. She has been a member of the Nevada Assembly since 2024. A member of the Democratic Party, she was elected in the 2024 Nevada Assembly election. She is a shop steward and a member of the Culinary Workers Union Local 226. She worked as a food server at the El Cortez Hotel and Casino in Las Vegas.
