= Heather Goulding =

American politician from Nevada

Member of the Nevada Assembly from the 27th district
- Incumbent
- Assumed office November 6, 2024
- Preceded by: Angie Taylor

Personal details
- Party: Democratic
- Website: www.voteheatherg.com

Heather Goulding is an American politician. She has been a member of the Nevada Assembly since 2024. A member of the Democratic Party, she was elected in the 2024 Nevada Assembly election. Goulding works in utility energy efficiency programs. She served for 10 years as a volunteer ski instructor at the Sky Tavern Junior Ski Program.
