= Blayne Osborn =

American politician

Member of the Nevada Assembly from the 39th district
- Incumbent
- Assumed office October 16, 2025
- Preceded by: Ken Gray

Personal details
- Party: Republican

Blayne Osborn is an American politician who has been a member of the Nevada Assembly since 2025. A member of the Nevada Republican Party, he was appointed to the Nevada Assembly to replace Ken Gray. Osborn was president of Nevada Rural Hospital Partners. He was a candidate in the 2022 Nevada Assembly election.
