= Ryan Hampton (writer) =

American author & public policy advocate (born 1980)

- Hampton in July 2026

Member of the Nevada Assembly from the 9th district
- Incumbent
- Assumed office November 4, 2026
- Preceded by: Steve Yeager

Personal details
- Born: August 9, 1980 (age 46) Miami, Florida, U.S.
- Party: Democratic
- Education: MAST Academy; Marymount University (attended)
- Occupation: Politician, author, nonprofit executive

Ryan Hampton (born August 9, 1980) is an American politician, author and addiction recovery advocate who is a member of the Nevada Assembly from the 9th district. A member of the Democratic Party, he was elected in November 2026. He is the founder of the nonprofit organization Mobilize Recovery and the author of three books on the opioid epidemic in the United States. In 2026, Time included him on its TIME100 Health list.

== Early life and education ==
Hampton was born in Miami. He attended MAST Academy and later Marymount University.

== Career ==
=== Addiction recovery advocacy ===
In 2003, after a knee injury, Hampton was prescribed OxyContin and subsequently struggled with opioid addiction until entering long-term recovery in 2015. Following his recovery, Hampton became active in national addiction recovery advocacy.

In February 2026, Time named Hampton to its TIME100 Health list of the 100 most influential people in health.

=== Mobilize Recovery ===
In 2019, Hampton founded Mobilize Recovery, a nonprofit organization that organizes advocates and provides training focused on addiction recovery. The organization has held annual advocacy events and reports having trained over 10,000 advocates nationwide. According to the organization, its Overdose Response Initiative, conducted in partnership with the Clinton Foundation and Direct Relief International, has distributed nearly one million doses of naloxone across 21 states as of January 2025.

== American Fix ==
In August 2018, Hampton published his first book, American Fix: Inside the Opioid Addiction Crisis-and How to End It – co-written with Claire Rudy Foster, published by St. Martin's Press/MacMillan publishing. In American Fix, Hampton writes with candor about his experiences with what he calls a broken treatment system and outlines a political agenda for combatting the nation's addiction crisis.

He later published Unsettled: How the Purdue Pharma Bankruptcy Failed the Victims of the American Overdose Crisis (2021) and Fentanyl Nation: Toxic Politics and America's Failed War on Drugs (2024), both with St. Martin's Press.

Hampton is a frequent contributor to The Huffington Post.

== Political activism ==
In August 2018, Hampton led a 500-person protest against drugmaker Purdue Pharma for their role in the American opioid crisis. He has been at the forefront in calling for accountability from drug makers.

In January 2019, Hampton attended President Trump's State of the Union address as a guest of U.S. House Democrats, representing the addiction recovery advocacy movement.

=== Purdue Pharma bankruptcy case ===
In 2019, Hampton was appointed by the U.S. Department of Justice to the unsecured creditors’ committee in the Purdue Pharma bankruptcy case, serving as co-chair. He was one of four victims selected to represent individuals affected by the company's opioids.

In 2025, Hampton appeared on a segment of 60 Minutes to address the bankruptcy settlement. He criticized the structure of the deal, arguing that it favored institutional claimants over individuals and enabled the Sackler family to retain substantial personal wealth.

== Political campaigns ==
=== 2024 Nevada State Assembly campaign ===
In 2024, Hampton was the Democratic candidate for Nevada State Assembly District 4. His platform focused on cost-of-living issues, housing, education, and access to healthcare, including addiction treatment. He received endorsements from several organizations, including the Nevada State Education Association and Planned Parenthood Votes Nevada. In the general election on November 5, 2024, he was defeated by Republican candidate Lisa Cole, who received 54.4% of the vote to Hampton's 45.6%.

=== 2026 Nevada State Assembly campaign ===
In August 2025, Hampton announced his candidacy for Assembly District 9 in southwest Las Vegas after the incumbent, Assembly Speaker Steve Yeager, said he would not seek reelection. Yeager endorsed him. Hampton won the Democratic primary in June 2026 with 58.55% of the vote against Maria Teresa Hank.

In the general election on November 3, 2026, Hampton defeated Republican Erica Neely. Neely was the Republican nominee for the seat in both 2024, when she lost to Yeager 51.1% to 48.9%, and 2026. Hampton received 15,611 votes (61.03%) to Neely's 9,970 (38.97%).

2026 Nevada Assembly District 9 general election
Party	Candidate	Votes	%
Democratic	Ryan Hampton	15,611	61.03
Republican	Erica Neely	9,970	38.97
Total votes		25,581	100.0
Democratic hold			
