= Jovan Jackson =

American politician from Nevada

Member of the Nevada Assembly from the 6th district
- Incumbent
- Assumed office November 6, 2024
- Preceded by: Shondra Summers-Armstrong

Personal details
- Party: Democratic
- Website: www.jovanjackson.com/home

Jovan A. Jackson is an American politician. He has been a member of the Nevada Assembly since 2024. A member of the Democratic Party, he was elected in the 2024 Nevada Assembly election. In 2022, Jackson ran for North Las Vegas City Council. He was the first candidate with a known felony conviction to be elected to state office in Nevada. He is a criminal justice reform advocate.
