= Angie Taylor =

American politician from Nevada

Member of the Nevada Senate from the 15th district
- Incumbent
- Assumed office November 6, 2024
- Preceded by: Heidi Gansert

Member of the Nevada Assembly from the 27th district
- In office November 9, 2022 – November 6, 2024
- Preceded by: Teresa Benitez-Thompson
- Succeeded by: Heather Goulding

Personal details
- Born: San Francisco, California, U.S.
- Party: Democratic

Angie Taylor is an American politician currently representing the 15th district in the Nevada Senate. She represented the 27th district in the state assembly from 2022 to 2024. A member of the Democratic Party, she previously served on the Washoe County School District Board of Trustees for District E.
