= Venise Karris =

American politician from Nevada

Member of the Nevada Assembly from the 10th district
- Incumbent
- Assumed office November 6, 2024
- Preceded by: Sabra Newby

Personal details
- Born: Chicago, Illinois
- Party: Democratic
- Education: University of Illinois
- Website: votekarris.com

Venise Karris is an American politician. She has been a member of the Nevada Assembly since 2024. A member of the Democratic Party, she was elected in the 2024 Nevada Assembly election. She was a medical researcher before working as an electrician for 27 years. She is a retired electrician. She was member of the International Brotherhood of Electrical Workers.

She received a bachelor of science in biology in 1980 from the University of Illinois.
