= Jason Patchett =

American politician

Member of the Nevada Assembly from the 19th district
- Incumbent
- Assumed office November 4, 2025
- Preceded by: Toby Yurek

Personal details
- Party: Republican

Jason Patchett is an American politician who has been a member of the Nevada Assembly since 2025. A member of the Nevada Republican Party, he was appointed to the Nevada Assembly to replace Toby Yurek. Patchett has been described as a "moderate Republican". Patchett is a parent who lost his son to a speeding driver. He is an advocate for "Rex's Law".
