= Bea Duran =

American politician from Nevada

Member of the Nevada Assembly from the 11th district
- In office December 18, 2018 – November 6, 2024
- Preceded by: Olivia Diaz
- Succeeded by: Cinthia Zermeño Moore

Personal details
- Born: 1963 (age 62–63) Cheyenne, Wyoming, U.S.
- Party: Democratic
- Children: 2

Beatrice "Bea" Angela Duran is an American politician and union grievance specialist from Las Vegas, Nevada, who was a member of the Nevada Assembly.

== Early life ==
Duran was born in 1963 in Cheyenne, Wyoming.

== Career ==
In 1986, Duran, then a waitress at the Four Queens Hotel and Casino, became active in the Culinary Workers Union, the Las Vegas-based Local 226 of UNITE HERE, and was on staff as the union achieved recognition there. Since 1999 she has worked as a staff member for the Culinary Union, where she was a grievance specialist with their Culinary Grievance Department.

=== Politics ===
In December 2018, the Clark County Commission appointed Duran as a Democratic member to represent the 11th district (portions of Las Vegas and North Las Vegas) of the Nevada Assembly, to replace Olivia Diaz (who had resigned from her Assembly seat soon after winning re-election, to run for the Las Vegas City Council).
