= Clara Thomas (politician) =

American politician and member of the Nevada Assembly

Member of the Nevada Assembly from the 17th district
- In office November 4, 2020 – November 6, 2024
- Preceded by: Kasina Douglass-Boone
- Succeeded by: Linda Hunt

Personal details
- Party: Democratic
- Website: www.electclairethomas.com

Clara (Claire) Thomas is an American politician serving as a member of the Nevada Assembly from the 17th district. Thomas was elected to the Nevada Assembly in November 2020.

Thomas was born in Tifton, Georgia and previously served in the United States Air Force.
