= Joe Dalia =

American politician (born 1991)

Member of the Nevada Assembly from the 29th district
- Incumbent
- Assumed office November 6, 2024
- Preceded by: Lesley Cohen

Personal details
- Born: 1991 (age 34–35) Boston, Massachusetts, U.S.
- Party: Democratic
- Spouse: Marina Dalia
- Children: 3
- Education: Boston University (BA); University of Michigan (JD)
- Website: Campaign website

Joseph John Dalia (born 1991) is an American politician. He has been a member of the Nevada Assembly since 2024. A member of the Democratic Party, he was elected in the 2024 Nevada Assembly election. Dalia graduated from Boston University. He worked as a privacy attorney for numerous Silicon Valley companies, most recently Meta Platforms.
