= Shondra Summers-Armstrong =

American politician and member of the Nevada Assembly

Member of the Nevada Assembly from the 6th district
- In office November 4, 2020 – December 4, 2024
- Preceded by: William McCurdy II
- Succeeded by: Jovan Jackson

Member of Las Vegas City Council from the 6th ward
- Incumbent
- Assumed office December 4, 2024
- Preceded by: Cedric Crear

Personal details
- Born: 1964 (age 61–62) Richmond, California, U.S.
- Party: Democratic
- Children: 3

Shondra Summers-Armstrong (born 1964) is an American politician serving as a member of the Las Vegas city council since December 4, 2024. A member of the Democratic Party, she previously served as a member of the Nevada Assembly from the 6th district. She assumed office on November 4, 2020.

== Early life and education ==
Summers-Armstrong was born in Richmond, California and graduated from California High School. She has also taken courses at the College of Southern Nevada.

== Career ==
After marrying her husband, Summers-Armstrong lived in Germany while he was serving in the United States Air Force. She and her husband had two sons and moved to Las Vegas before divorcing.

Summers-Armstrong has worked as a management analyst for the Regional Transportation Commission of Southern Nevada. She was also a board member of SEIU Nevada. Summers-Armstrong was elected to the Nevada Assembly in November 2020.
