= Reuben D'Silva =

American politician

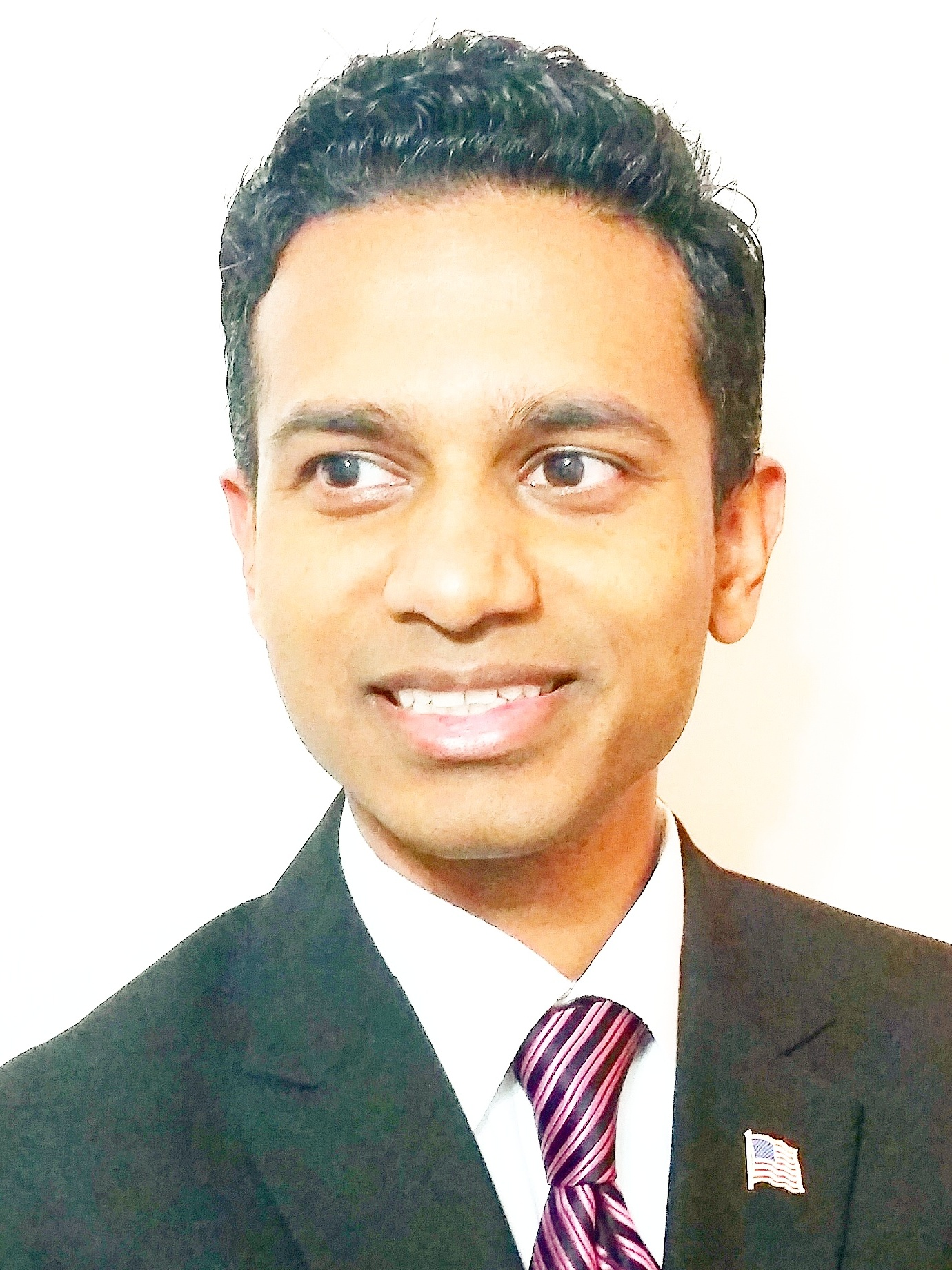

Member of the Nevada Assembly from the 28th district
- Incumbent
- Assumed office November 9, 2022
- Preceded by: Edgar Flores

Personal details
- Born: 1985 (age 40–41) Mumbai, India
- Party: Democratic
- Other political affiliations: Independent
- Education: Rancho High School
- Alma mater: College of Southern Nevada (A.A.); University of Nevada at Las Vegas (B.A.); University of Pennsylvania (M.A.); Yale University (M.A.)
- Occupation: High School History Teacher

Military service
- Branch/service: United States Marine Corps
- Years of service: 2004–2008
- Rank: Corporal
- Battles/wars: Operation Iraqi Freedom
- Awards: Purple Heart

Reuben D'Silva (born 1985) is an American politician serving as a member of the Nevada Assembly from the 28th district.

== Early life and education ==
D'Silva was born in Mumbai, India, and immigrated to the United States as a toddler. At the time of immigration, his mother was undocumented and his father had temporary protected status. After his mother received a letter of deportation, then-Senator Richard Bryan, who later became state governor, stepped in to help. Growing up in the Las Vegas Valley from the age of six, he attended the now-closed St. Christopher Catholic School and Rancho High School in North Las Vegas, Nevada, where he served as class president for his graduating class. After graduating from high school in 2003, he attended the Community College of Southern Nevada and enlisted in the U.S. Marine Corps after. He is a practicing Catholic and is a member of the Knights of Columbus, attending the St. James the Apostle church in Las Vegas.

He transferred to the University of Nevada, Las Vegas (UNLV), while still serving as a Marine from 2003 to 2008. While enrolled in February 2007, he was deployed to Iraq and served as a truck driver and machine gunner in the Iraq War. He was awarded the Purple Heart and the Naval Achievement Medal for his service during the war, as he was injured by enemy gunfire and helped save his platoon mates.

After returning to UNLV, D'Silva graduated with a Bachelor's degree in History. He received a Master's degree in Global Studies from the University of Pennsylvania and another Master's degree in Comparative Religion and Politics at Yale University.

== Career ==
Following the completion of his education, D'Silva returned to Las Vegas to teach History at his alma mater, Rancho High School. He also coached the girls' basketball team and serves as an advisor for several clubs.

As a community and political organizer, D'Silva has led and organized community events in several states, including his local Nevada, as well as California, Arizona, Massachusetts, New Jersey, Louisiana, Arkansas, Georgia, Virginia, and Washington, D.C. D'Silva also served as the Western Regional Director of Social Action for his fraternity, Phi Beta Sigma, and served as the Alumni Director of Education.

== Political career ==
In 2013, D'Silva was selected by then-Senator Harry Reid to serve on Nevada's Military Academy Selection Committee. In 2014, mayor pro tempore and city councilmember Isaac Barron appointed him as a Trustee for the North Las Vegas Library District.

=== United States House of Representatives ===
==== Elections ====
===== 2016 =====
D'Silva ran as an independent against Democratic incumbent Dina Titus and finished 3rd with 7.3% of the vote.

===== 2018 =====
He ran against Titus again in 2018, this time as Democrat, however he was comfortably defeated in the primary 79% to 21%.

=== Nevada State Assembly ===
==== Elections ====
===== 2022 =====
With Edgar Flores opting to run for the Nevada Senate rather than for re-election, D'Silva was one of four Democrats who ran to succeed him. He easily won the primary before winning the general election with a 2 to 1 margin over Republican Clint Brown. D'Silva is the first Indian-American to serve in the Nevada State Assembly.

== Electoral history ==
Nevada State Assembly's 28th district, 2022
Party	Candidate	Votes	%
Democratic	Reuben D'Silva	6,323	67.4
Republican	Clint Brown	3,055	32.6
Total votes		9,378	100.0
Democratic hold			

Democratic primary for Nevada State Assembly's 28th district, 2022
Party	Candidate	Votes	%
Democratic	Reuben D'Silva	1,252	64.6
Democratic	Cindi Rivera	336	17.3
Democratic	Aaron Bautista	230	11.9
Democratic	Antonio Bowen	121	6.2
Total votes		1,939	100.0

Democratic primary for Nevada's 1st congressional district, 2018
Party	Candidate	Votes	%
Democratic	Dina Titus (incumbent)	20,897	78.7
Democratic	Reuben D'Silva	5,659	21.3
Total votes		26,556	100.0

Nevada's 1st congressional district election, 2016
Party	Candidate	Votes	%
Democratic	Dina Titus (incumbent)	116,537	61.9
Republican	Mary Perry	54,174	28.8
Independent	Reuben D'Silva	13,897	7.3
Independent American	Kamau Bakari	3,744	2.0
Total votes		188,352	100.0
Democratic hold			
