= Selena La Rue Hatch =

American politician, member of the Nevada State Assembly

Member of the Nevada Assembly from the 25th district
- Incumbent
- Assumed office November 9, 2022
- Preceded by: Jill Tolles

Personal details
- Spouse: Stephen Hatch
- Children: 1
- Education: Boston University (BA); University of Nevada, Reno (MEd)

Selena La Rue Hatch is an American politician and a member of the Nevada State Assembly. A Democrat, she represents the 25th district. She teaches World History and Geography at North Valleys High School in addition to her legislative work.

== Personal life ==
Selena La Rue Hatch is a fourth generation Nevadan. Selena grew up on a ranch near Pyramid Lake in Nevada. She received a BA degree in history from Boston University. She then earned her Masters of Education from the University of Nevada, Reno. She taught world history at Hug High School and then taught at North Valleys High School before running for office. She is married to Stephen Hatch and has a daughter named Abby.

== Career ==
Selena has been a teacher with the Washoe County School District for around a decade. She is an active member of the Washoe Education Association teachers' union.

== Electoral history ==
Nevada Assembly District 25 Democratic primary, 2022
| Party | Candidate | Votes | % |
|---|---|---|---|
| Democratic | Selena La Rue Hatch | 4,493 | 64.88% |
| Democratic | Alex Goff | 2,432 | 35.12% |
| Total votes | | 6,925 | 100.0% |

Nevada Assembly District 25 election, 2022
| Party | Candidate | Votes | % |
|---|---|---|---|
| Democratic | Selena La Rue Hatch | 17,608 | 53.90% |
| Republican | Sam Kumar | 15,060 | 46.10% |
| Total votes | | 27,443 | 100.0% |

Nevada Assembly District 25 election, 2024
| Party | Candidate | Votes | % |
|---|---|---|---|
| Democratic | Selena La Rue Hatch | 21,586 | 53.51% |
| Republican | Diana Sande | 18,754 | 46.49% |
| Total votes | | 40,340 | 100.0% |
