= Gregory Koenig =

American politician from Nevada

Member of the Nevada Assembly from the 38th district
- Incumbent
- Assumed office November 9, 2022
- Preceded by: Robin Titus

Personal details
- Born: May 4, 1967 (age 59) Pasco, Washington, U.S.
- Party: Republican
- Education: University of Nevada, Reno; Pacific University

Gregory Koenig is an American politician and optometrist, serving as a member of the Nevada Assembly since 2022. A member of the Republican Party, he lives in and represents Fallon, Nevada.
