= Rich DeLong (politician) =

American politician

Member of the Nevada Assembly from the 26th district
- Incumbent
- Assumed office November 9, 2022
- Preceded by: Lisa Krasner

Personal details
- Born: 1957 (age 68–69) Los Angeles, California, U.S.
- Party: Republican
- Education: California State University, Chico (BS); University of Idaho (MS, MS)

Richard DeLong (born 1957) is an American geologist, businessman, and politician, serving as a member of the Nevada Assembly since 2022. A member of the Republican Party, DeLong represents parts of the city of Reno in the Nevada Legislature.
