= Danielle Gallant =

American politician from Nevada

Member of the Nevada Assembly from the 23rd district
- Incumbent
- Assumed office November 9, 2022
- Preceded by: Glen Leavitt

Personal details
- Born: San Francisco, California, US
- Party: Republican
- Education: Auburn University (BA, MA)

Danielle Gallant is an American politician, therapist, and realtor, serving as a member of the Nevada Assembly since 2022. A member of the Republican Party, Gallant resides in Las Vegas and represents parts of the city and larger Clark County, Nevada.
