= Bert Gurr =

Member of the Nevada Legislature

Member of the Nevada Assembly from the 33rd district
- Incumbent
- Assumed office November 9, 2022
- Preceded by: John Ellison

Personal details
- Born: 1948 (age 77–78) Roosevelt, Utah, U.S.
- Party: Republican

Bert Gurr (born 1948) is an American politician and a member of the Nevada Legislature. A Republican, he represents Nevada's 33rd district.

Gurr was born in 1948 in Roosevelt, Utah.
