= Erica Mosca =

American politician and teacher from Nevada

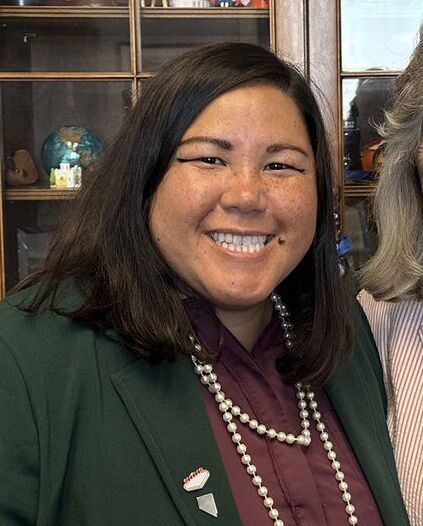
- Mosca in 2023

Member of the Nevada Assembly from the 14th district
- Incumbent
- Assumed office November 9, 2022
- Preceded by: Maggie Carlton

Personal details
- Born: June 29, 1986 (age 40)
- Party: Democratic
- Spouse: Nicholas Jared Smith (m. 2020)
- Education: Boston University (BS); University of Nevada, Las Vegas (MEd); Harvard University (EdM)
- Occupation: Teacher

Erica Mosca is an American politician and teacher, serving in the Nevada Assembly since 2022. A member of the Democratic Party, Mosca represents parts of Las Vegas, and is the first Filipina legislator in Nevada.

== Early childhood ==
Erica Mosca was born in San Diego, California and grew up in the naval base in Mira Mesa. Her father, was a naval officer who immigrated from the Philippines, and her mother, was from the US. She has a younger brother, Eddie. In the earlier days, the family struggled financially and often moved when her father landed a better job. When Mosca was 16, they moved to Novato, California, and Mosca describes this as a very "pivotal experience" that "propelled her for the rest of her personal and professional career."

In 2008, they moved to Nevada and worked as enumerators and go house to house for census'. Later, her mother found a temp agency where she was placed to work at R and O construction and has been working there since as a secretary.

== Education ==
Mosca went to Novato High School in Palm Springs. She got her Bachelor's Degree from Boston University. She then went on to earn two graduate degrees: MEd from the University of Nevada, Las Vegas, and EdM from Harvard University. While she was at Harvard, she joined the Education Pioneers Program. While in Boston, she worked at Teach Plus in 2011 as well has interned with Jeff Riley, the Commissioner of Education in Massachusetts.

== Career ==
In 2008, Mosca accepted in Teach in America in Las Vegas, initially working at Goldfarb Elementary School. She describes this experience as "interesting" as she had a diverse group of students.

In 2012, she started her 501 c(3) nonprofit "Leaders in Training," a tutoring service as well as leadership sessions run by Mosca and local high schoolers. This was targeted towards middle school and elementary students. By 2017, the nonprofit grew, moving from a portable to an office on Lamb and Washington. The primary vision of Leaders in Training was to encourage students to pursue colleges, military, or trade school.

In 2022, she left the position so she could run for office. She won, representing East Las Vegas and became the first Filipina to be on state legislature. As of 2023, she worked in the Education and Revenue Committee. Since then, she has been working the "Portrait of a Learner" to receive feedback from youth as well as the Asian Community Development Council. She was also on Charter Authority.

== Sponsored bills ==
Bill	Title	Status
AB82	Requires the Governor to proclaim certain days of observance. (BDR 19-60)	(No further action taken.)
AB83	Designates Larry Itliong Day as a day of observance in this State. (BDR 19-99)	(No further action taken.)
AB123	Revises provisions relating to elections communications. (BDR 24-733)	Chapter 517. (Effective October 1, 2025)
AB156	Revises provisions governing the members of the board of trustees of school districts. (BDR 34-689)	(Pursuant to Joint Standing Rule No. 14.3.3, no further action allowed.)
AB191	Revises provisions relating to collective bargaining. (BDR 23-889)	(No further action taken.)
AB223	Revises provisions relating to the habitability of rental property. (BDR 10-684)	(No further action taken.)
AB224	Provides for the issuance of bonds to assist certain school districts in financing capital improvements. (BDR S-688)	Chapter 415. (Effective July 1, 2025)
AB226	Revises provisions relating to economic development. (BDR 32-690)	Vetoed by the Governor.
AB246A	Revises provisions governing elections. (BDR 24-821)	Bill read. No further consideration.
AB253	Revises provisions relating to civil liability. (BDR 3-722)	(Pursuant to Joint Standing Rule No. 14.3.1, no further action allowed.)
AB254	Revises provisions relating to grants. (BDR 18-691)	(No further action taken.)
AB263	Revises provisions relating to homelessness. (BDR 20-96)	Chapter 242. (Effective October 1, 2025)
AB278	Designates the month of July as Muslim American Heritage Month. (BDR 19-924)	(No further action taken.)
AB285	Establishes the Nevada State Service Corps within the Department of Administration. (BDR 23-98)	(No further action taken.)
AB290	Revises provisions relating to prior authorization for medical or dental care under health insurance plans. (BDR 57-861)	(No further action taken.)
AB300	Makes an appropriation for the construction of a veterans and community center in Virginia City, Nevada. (BDR S-1065)	(No further action taken.)
AB306	Revises provisions relating to elections. (BDR 24-569)	(No further action taken.)
AB345	Revises provisions relating to education. (BDR 34-97)	Chapter 470.
AB378	Creates the Alternative Therapy Pilot Program. (BDR 40-820)	(No further action taken.)
AB442	Revises provisions relating to grants. (BDR 31-589)	Chapter 474. (Effective July 1, 2026)
ACR3	Expresses gratitude to the National Conference of State Legislatures for 50 years of service. (BDR R-986)	File No. 11.
AJR7	Proposes to amend the Nevada Constitution to revise provisions relating to the compensation of certain elected officers. (BDR C-654)	(Pursuant to Joint Standing Rule No. 14.3.4, no further action allowed.)
AJR14	Condemns the January 6, 2021, attack on the U.S. Capitol and denounces the use of presidential pardons and commutations to absolve the rioters. (BDR R-991)	File No. 22. (Effective May 22, 2025)
SB262	Revises provisions relating to graduate medical education. (BDR 18-120)	Chapter 500. (Effective July 1, 2025)
SB306	Revises provisions relating to mental health services for children. (BDR 39-796)	(No further action taken.)
SCR1	Memorializes esteemed native Nevadan and lobbyist Kathleen Neena Laxalt. (BDR R-1028)	File No. 9. (Effective February 18, 2025)
SCR4	Declares April 2025 as Financial Literacy Month. (BDR R-1163)	File No. 13. (Effective April 14, 2025)
SJR1	Urges Congress to enact legislation allowing certain eligible surviving spouses of veterans to receive an amount equal to the military retirement pay of the veteran after the veteran's death. (BDR R-55)	File No. 27. (Effective May 22, 2025)
SJR7A	Proposes to amend the Nevada Constitution to establish certain rights relating to reproductive health. (BDR C-864)	(Pursuant to Joint Standing Rule No. 14.3.1, no further action allowed.)
SJR8	Urges Congress to protect the public lands including and adjacent to Sunrise Mountain, Frenchman Mountain and the Rainbow Gardens Area. (BDR R-946)	File No. 29. (Effective May 22, 2025)
