= Max Carter =

American politician

Member of the Nevada Assembly for the 12th district
- Incumbent
- Assumed office November 9, 2022
- Preceded by: Susie Martinez

Personal details
- Born: Max Carter II; 1964 or 1965 (age 61–62) Las Vegas, Nevada, U.S.
- Party: Democratic
- Children: 3
- Education: Las Vegas High School

Max Carter II is an American politician and former union electrician with Local 357, who has served in the Nevada Assembly since 2022. A member of the Democratic Party, Carter represents parts of Las Vegas.
