= Lisa Cole (politician) =

American politician from Nevada

Member of the Nevada Assembly from the 4th district
- Incumbent
- Assumed office November 6, 2024
- Preceded by: Richard McArthur

Personal details
- Born: Johnstown, Pennsylvania
- Party: Republican
- Website: www.lisacolefornevada.com

Lisa K. Cole is an American politician. She has been a member of the Nevada Assembly since 2024. A member of the Republican Party, she was elected in the 2024 Nevada Assembly election. In 1996, she graduated from Allegheny College with a bachelor's degree in environmental science. In 2022, Cole graduated from Mitchell Hamline School of Law. She is a lawyer and the vice president of a small business.
