= Cameron Miller =

American politician (born 1980)

Member of the Nevada Assembly from the 7th district
- In office November 4, 2020 – October 30, 2023
- Preceded by: Dina Neal
- Succeeded by: Tanya Flanagan

Personal details
- Born: 1980 (age 45–46) Las Vegas, Nevada, U.S.
- Party: Democratic
- Education: Northwest University (BA)

Cameron "C.H." Miller (born 1980) is an American politician, media executive, political advisor, and former cosmetologist who served as a member of the Nevada Assembly from 2020 to 2023, representing the 7th district.

== Early life and education ==
Miller was born in Las Vegas in 1980. He completed a cosmetology certificate program at the Southeast Career Technical Academy and earned a Bachelor of Arts degree in ministry leadership from Northwest University in 2019.

== Career ==
From 1998 to 2011, Miller worked as a licensed cosmetologist. In 2012, he became an operations manager and producer at Studio 11 Films in Las Vegas. In 2016 and 2017, Miller produced The Lillian McMorris Show, a local radio program. He has also worked as a freelance executive producer and media consultant.

Miller served as the Nevada political director of the Amy Klobuchar 2020 presidential campaign. He previously worked as the Nevada political director for the Beto O'Rourke 2020 presidential campaign. He was elected to the Nevada Assembly in November 2020, succeeding Dina Neal. His district includes West Las Vegas. He resigned from the Assembly in October 2023 to run for a seat on the Las Vegas City Council.
