= Natha Anderson =

American politician, lobbyist, and educator

Member of the Nevada Assembly from the 30th district
- Incumbent
- Assumed office November 4, 2020
- Preceded by: Greg Smith

Personal details
- Born: Natha Clyde Anderson; 1972 (age 53–54) Reno, Nevada, U.S.
- Party: Democratic
- Education: University of Nevada, Reno (BA)

Natha Clyde Anderson (born 1972) is an American politician, lobbyist, and educator serving as a member of the Nevada Assembly from the 30th district. She assumed office on November 4, 2020.

== Early life and education ==
Anderson was born in Reno, Nevada in 1972. She earned a Bachelor of Arts degree in education from the University of Nevada, Reno. Anderson's father, Bernard "Bernie" Anderson, served as a member of the Nevada Assembly from 1991 to 2010.

== Career ==
Prior to entering politics, Anderson worked as a teacher. She was also the president of the Washoe Education Association. She was elected to the Nevada Assembly in 2020, succeeding Greg Smith.
