= Venicia Considine =

American politician and member of the Nevada Assembly

Member of the Nevada Assembly from the 18th district
- Incumbent
- Assumed office November 4, 2020
- Preceded by: Richard Carrillo

Personal details
- Party: Democratic

Venicia Considine is an American politician serving as a member of the Nevada Assembly from the 18th district. Considine was elected to the Nevada Assembly in November 2020.

Considine was born in Queens, New York.
