= Cecelia González =

American politician and member of the Nevada Assembly

Member of the Nevada Assembly from the 16th district
- Incumbent
- Assumed office November 4, 2020

Personal details
- Born: Whittier, California, U.S.
- Party: Democratic
- Education: University of Nevada, Las Vegas
- Occupation: Educator, Politician

Cecelia González is an American politician serving as a member of the Nevada Assembly from the 16th district. González was elected to the Nevada Assembly in 2020.

Gonzalez is Thai-Mexican American, daughter of immigrants, and native Nevadan. attended the University of Nevada, and was a member of Delta Tau Lambda.
