= Duy Nguyen =

Vietnamese-American politician from Nevada

Member of the Nevada Assembly from the 8th district
- Incumbent
- Assumed office November 9, 2022
- Preceded by: Jason Frierson

Personal details
- Born: 1979 or 1980 (age 46–47) Vietnam
- Party: Democratic
- Children: 2

Duy Nguyen is a Vietnamese-American politician, serving as a member of the Nevada Assembly since 2022. A member of the Democratic Party, Nguyen represents parts of Las Vegas.

== Personal life ==
Nguyen has been married to his wife since at least 2013, and they have one son and one daughter.
