= Nevada State Assembly =

Lower house of the Nevada Legislature

Coordinates: 39.161643°N 119.766139°W

- Nevada Legislature

- Nevada Legislature emblem

Type
- Type: Lower house
- Term limits: 6 terms (12 years)

History
- Preceded by: 82nd Nevada Legislature
- New session started: February 3, 2025

Leadership
- Speaker: Steve Yeager (D) since February 6, 2023
- Speaker pro tempore: Daniele Monroe-Moreno (D) since February 6, 2023
- Majority Leader: Sandra Jauregui (D) since February 6, 2023
- Minority Leader: Gregory Hafen II (R) since February 3, 2025

Structure
- Seats: 42
- Political groups: Majority: Democratic (27); Minority: Republican (15)
- Length of term: 2 years
- Authority: Article 4, Constitution of Nevada
- Salary: $146.90/day + per diem

Elections
- Last election: November 3, 2026
- Next election: November 7, 2028
- Redistricting: Legislative control

Meeting place
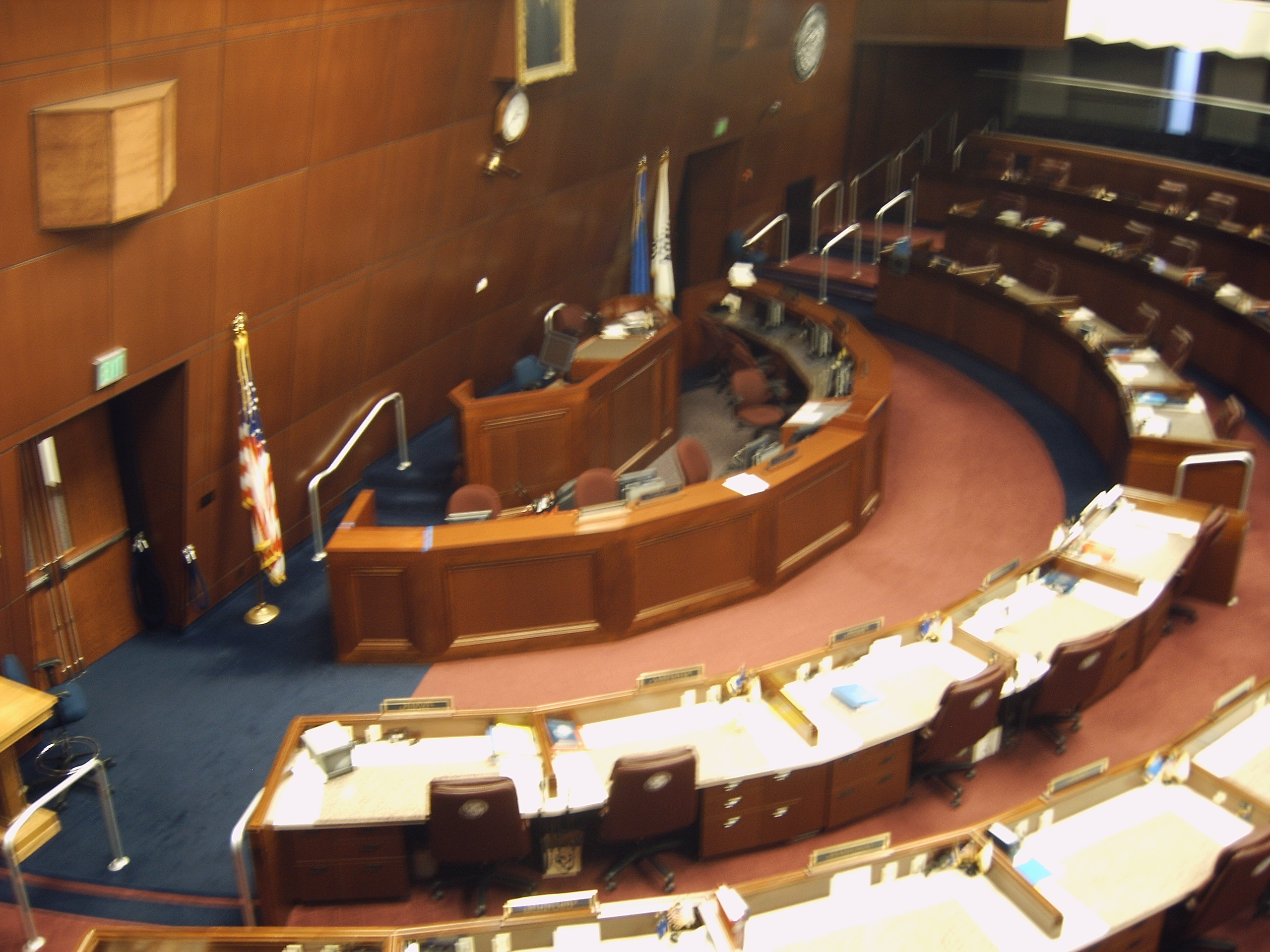
- Assembly Chamber; Legislative Building; Carson City, Nevada

Website
- Nevada State Assembly

The Nevada State Assembly is the lower house of the Nevada Legislature, the state legislature of the U.S. state of Nevada, the upper house being the Nevada State Senate. The body consists of 42 members, elected to two-year terms from single-member districts. Each district contained approximately 64,299 people as of the 2010 United States census. Term limits, limiting assembly members to six 2-year terms (12 years), took effect in 2010.

The Nevada Assembly met at the Nevada State Capitol in Carson City until 1971, when a separate Legislative Building was constructed south of the Capitol. The Legislative Building was expanded in 1997 to its current appearance to accommodate the growing Nevada Legislature. Since the 2012 session, Assembly districts have been formed by dividing the 21 Senate districts in half, so that each Assembly district is nested within a Senate district.

== Membership ==
The Assembly, like the Senate, is composed of citizen legislators, receiving a relatively small ($130) per diem fee for the first 60 days of a given session. This tends to self-selection, with legislative service difficult for those without flexible jobs and/or large outside incomes, such as doctors and lawyers. The Assembly, like the Senate, meets however long is necessary for the completion of all its business, up to a maximum of 120 days, beginning the first Monday in February of every odd-numbered year. In recent years 120 days has often not been enough time to complete legislative business, and after four straight regular sessions, special sessions had been called to finish up legislative business. This trend ended in 2011, which was not followed by a special session.

== Meetings ==
Above the speaker is a large gavel, which is engraved with the name of speaker Joe Dini; the longest serving speaker of the Nevada Assembly. Above the gavel is a portrait of Abraham Lincoln, who was president when Nevada became a state in 1864. To the left of the main door to the chamber is a podium with a Bible, which is changed to different passages by the Assembly sergeant-at-arms.

Since 2003, one floor session has always been held in the old Assembly chambers in the state capitol. The session usually begins with a presentation from the state archivist regarding the history of the chamber, and then legislative business proceeds as usual. Because there are no screens or voting equipment in the old chamber, all business is hand-written on a chalk board, as it would have been done when the Assembly still met in the Capitol.

All joint-meetings and joint-sessions are held in the Assembly chamber, including the state of the state address, the state of the judiciary address, and addresses from Nevada's federal delegation. Unlike the federal government, where the speaker of the House presides over all joint-meetings and sessions (except when Congress counts the electoral votes after a presidential election), the president of the Senate presides over joint-meetings and sessions instead of the speaker of the Assembly.

== Composition ==
=== Members ===
District	Name	Party	Residence	Start	Term Limited
1	Daniele Monroe-Moreno	Democratic	North Las Vegas	2016	No
2	Heidi Kasama	Republican	Las Vegas	2020	No
3	Selena Torres	Democratic	Las Vegas	2018	No
4	Lisa Cole	Republican	Las Vegas	2024	No
5	Brittney Miller	Democratic	Las Vegas	2016	No
6	Jovan Jackson	Democratic	North Las Vegas	2024	No
7	Tanya Flanagan	Democratic	North Las Vegas	2024	No
8	Duy Nguyen	Democratic	Las Vegas	2022	No
9	Steve Yeager	Democratic	Las Vegas	2016	No
10	Venise Karris	Democratic	Las Vegas	2024	1st
11	Cinthia Moore	Democratic	Las Vegas	2024	No
12	Max Carter	Democratic	Las Vegas	2022	No
13	Brian Hibbetts	Republican	Las Vegas	2022	No
14	Erica Mosca	Democratic	Las Vegas	2022	No
15	Howard Watts III	Democratic	Las Vegas	2018	No
16	Cecelia González	Democratic	Las Vegas	2020	No
17	Linda Hunt	Democratic	North Las Vegas	2024	No
18	Venicia Considine	Democratic	Las Vegas	2020	No
19	Jason Patchett	Republican	Henderson	2025 (Note: Originally appointed.)	No
20	David Orentlicher	Democratic	Las Vegas	2020	No
21	Elaine Marzola	Democratic	Henderson	2020	No
22	Melissa Hardy	Republican	Henderson	2018	No
23	Danielle Gallant	Republican	Las Vegas	2022	No
24	Erica Roth	Democratic	Reno	2024	No
25	Selena La Rue Hatch	Democratic	Reno	2022	No
26	Rich DeLong	Republican	Reno	2022	No
27	Heather Goulding	Democratic	Reno	2024	No
28	Reuben D'Silva	Democratic	Las Vegas	2022	No
29	Joe Dalia	Democratic	Henderson	2024	No
30	Natha Anderson	Democratic	Sparks	2020	No
31	Jill Dickman	Republican	Sparks	2020 (Note: Dickman previously served in the state assembly from 2014–2016.)	No
32	Alexis Hansen	Republican	Sparks	2018	No
33	Bert Gurr	Republican	Elko	2022	No
34	Hanadi Nadeem	Democratic	Las Vegas	2024	No
35	Rebecca Edgeworth	Republican	Las Vegas	2024	No
36	Gregory Hafen II	Republican	Pahrump	2018	No
37	Shea Backus	Democratic	Las Vegas	2022 (Note: Backus previously served in the state assembly from 2018–2020.)	No
38	Gregory Koenig	Republican	Fallon	2022	No
39	Blayne Osborn	Republican	Gardnerville	2025	No
40	P. K. O'Neill	Republican	Carson City	2020 (Note: O'Neill previously served in the state assembly from 2014–2016.)	No
41	Sandra Jauregui	Democratic	Las Vegas	2016	No
42	Tracy Brown-May	Democratic	Las Vegas	2021	No

=== Leadership ===
The speaker of the Assembly presides over the Assembly in the chief leadership position, controlling the flow of legislation and committee assignments. The speaker is elected by the majority party caucus, followed by confirmation of the full Assembly on passage of a floor vote. Other Assembly leaders, such as the majority and minority leaders, are elected by their respective party caucuses according to each party's strength in the chamber.

Position	Name	Party	District
Speaker	Steve Yeager	Democratic	9
Speaker pro tempore	Daniele Monroe-Moreno	Democratic	1
Majority leader	Sandra Jauregui	Democratic	41
Assistant majority leader	Erica Mosca	Democratic	14
Majority whip	Howard Watts III	Democratic	15
Assistant majority whip	Natha Anderson	Democratic	30
Minority leader	Gregory Hafen II	Republican	36
Assistant minority leader (north)	Gregory Koenig	Republican	31
Assistant minority leader (south)	Melissa Hardy	Republican	22
Minority whip	Toby Yurek	Republican	19

=== Members ===
District	Name	Party	Residence	Start	Term Limited
1	Daniele Monroe-Moreno	Democratic	North Las Vegas	2016	No
2	Heidi Kasama	Republican	Las Vegas	2020	No
3	Selena Torres	Democratic	Las Vegas	2018	No
4	Lisa Cole	Republican	Las Vegas	2024	No
5	Brittney Miller	Democratic	Las Vegas	2016	No
6	Jovan Jackson	Democratic	North Las Vegas	2024	No
7	Tanya Flanagan	Democratic	North Las Vegas	2024	No
8	Duy Nguyen	Democratic	Las Vegas	2022	No
9	Steve Yeager	Democratic	Las Vegas	2016	No
10	Venise Karris	Democratic	Las Vegas	2024	1st
11	Cinthia Moore	Democratic	Las Vegas	2024	No
12	Max Carter	Democratic	Las Vegas	2022	No
13	Brian Hibbetts	Republican	Las Vegas	2022	No
14	Erica Mosca	Democratic	Las Vegas	2022	No
15	Howard Watts III	Democratic	Las Vegas	2018	No
16	Cecelia González	Democratic	Las Vegas	2020	No
17	Linda Hunt	Democratic	North Las Vegas	2024	No
18	Venicia Considine	Democratic	Las Vegas	2020	No
19	Jason Patchett	Republican	Henderson	2025 (Note: Originally appointed.)	No
20	David Orentlicher	Democratic	Las Vegas	2020	No
21	Elaine Marzola	Democratic	Henderson	2020	No
22	Melissa Hardy	Republican	Henderson	2018	No
23	Danielle Gallant	Republican	Las Vegas	2022	No
24	Erica Roth	Democratic	Reno	2024	No
25	Selena La Rue Hatch	Democratic	Reno	2022	No
26	Rich DeLong	Republican	Reno	2022	No
27	Heather Goulding	Democratic	Reno	2024	No
28	Reuben D'Silva	Democratic	Las Vegas	2022	No
29	Joe Dalia	Democratic	Henderson	2024	No
30	Natha Anderson	Democratic	Sparks	2020	No
31	Jill Dickman	Republican	Sparks	2020 (Note: Dickman previously served in the state assembly from 2014–2016.)	No
32	Alexis Hansen	Republican	Sparks	2018	No
33	Bert Gurr	Republican	Elko	2022	No
34	Hanadi Nadeem	Democratic	Las Vegas	2024	No
35	Rebecca Edgeworth	Republican	Las Vegas	2024	No
36	Gregory Hafen II	Republican	Pahrump	2018	No
37	Shea Backus	Democratic	Las Vegas	2022 (Note: Backus previously served in the state assembly from 2018–2020.)	No
38	Gregory Koenig	Republican	Fallon	2022	No
39	Blayne Osborn	Republican	Gardnerville	2025	No
40	P. K. O'Neill	Republican	Carson City	2020 (Note: O'Neill previously served in the state assembly from 2014–2016.)	No
41	Sandra Jauregui	Democratic	Las Vegas	2016	No
42	Tracy Brown-May	Democratic	Las Vegas	2021	No

=== Partisan control ===
↓
27	15
Democratic	Republican

Affiliation	Party (Shading indicates majority caucus)			Total	Vacant
Affiliation	Democratic	Republican	Libertarian	Total	Vacant
Begin 77th February 2013	27	15	0	42	0
End 77th November 2014	25	14	0	39	3
Begin 78th February 2015	17	25	0	42	0
End 78th November 2016	17	24	1	42	0
Begin 79th February 2017	27	15	0	42	0
End 79th November 2018	27	14	0	41	1
Begin 80th February 2019	29	13	0	42	0
End November 2020	28	13	0	41	1
81st Legislature	26	16	0	42	0
82nd Legislature	28	14	0	42	0
Begin 83rd February 2025	27	15	0	42	0
Latest voting share	64.3%	35.7%			

== See also ==
- Nevada Senate
- Nevada Legislature
- Nevada State Capitol
- List of Nevada state legislatures
- Government of Nevada
