= 2014 Nevada Senate election =

- November 4, 2014

11 of the 21 seats in the Nevada Senate 11 seats needed for a majority

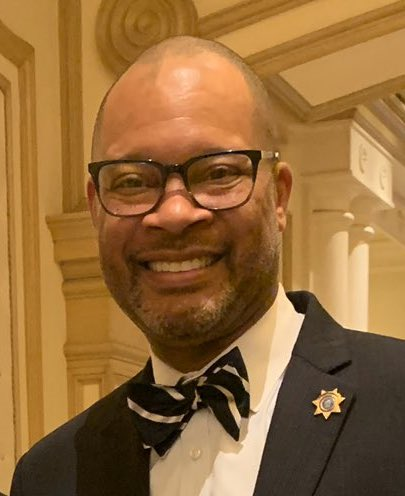
	Majority party	Minority party
Leader	Michael Roberson	Aaron Ford
Party	Republican	Democratic
Leader's seat	20th	11th
Seats before	10	11
Seats after	11	10
Seat change	▲1	▼1
- Results: Republican gain Democratic hold Republican hold No election
Leader of the Senate before election
Mo Denis
Democratic
Elected Leader of the Senate
Michael Roberson
Republican

The 2014 Nevada Senate election took place as part of the biennial United States elections. Nevada voters elected state senators in 11 of the state senate's 21 districts. State senators serve four-year terms in the Nevada Senate.

A primary election on June 10, 2014, determined which candidates appear on the November 4 general election ballot. Primary election and general election results can be obtained from the State of Nevada's Secretary of State website. As of 2024, this is the last time Republicans won a majority.

== Predictions ==
Source	Ranking	As of
Governing	Tossup	October 20, 2014

=== Polling ===
District 8

Poll source	Date(s) administered	Sample size	Margin of error	Patricia Farley (R)	Marilyn Dondero Loop (D)	Other	Undecided
GreenbergQuinlanRosner	September 25–28, 2014	400	± 4.9%	46%	44%	—	10%
The Tarrance Group	September 22–24, 2014	301	± ?	43%	36%	—	21%

District 9

Poll source	Date(s) administered	Sample size	Margin of error	Justin Jones (D)	Becky Harris (R)	Other	Undecided
Momentum Analysis	October 2–5, 2014	400	± 4.9%	46%	44%	—	10%
The Tarrance Group	September 23–25, 2014	376	± ?	42%	45%	—	13%

== Retirements ==
- Barbara Cegavske (R, District-8) was term-limited

== Results ==
=== District 2 ===
Nevada's 2nd Senate district election
Party	Candidate	Votes	%
Democratic	Mo Denis (incumbent)	5,683	76.35%
Constitution	Louis Baker	1,758	23.65%
Total votes		7,441	100.0%
Democratic hold			

=== District 8 ===
Nevada's 8th Senate District Democratic Primary Election
Party	Candidate	Votes	%
Democratic	Marilyn Dondero Loop	2,844	83.01%
Democratic	Garrett J. Leduff	582	16.99%
Total votes		3,426	100.0%

Nevada's 8th Senate District Republican Primary Election
Party	Candidate	Votes	%
Republican	Patricia Farley	2,814	52.01%
Republican	Clayton Kelly Hurust	2,054	37.96%
Republican	Lisa Myers	543	10.04%
Total votes		5,411	100.0%

Nevada's 8th Senate district election
Party	Candidate	Votes	%
Republican	Patricia Farley	16,205	52.01%
Democratic	Marilyn Dondero Loop	11,092	35.66%
Constitution	Jon Kamerath	1,119	3.60%
Total votes		31,416	100.0%
Republican hold			

=== District 9 ===
Nevada's 9th Senate District Republican Primary Election
Party	Candidate	Votes	%
Republican	Becky Harris	1,830	50.26%
Republican	Vick Gill	1,452	39.88%
Republican	David J. Schoen	206	5.66%
Republican	Ron Q. Quilang	153	4.20%
Total votes		3,641	100.0%

Nevada's 9th Senate district election
Party	Candidate	Votes	%
Republican	Becky Harris	12,475	55.19%
Democratic	Justin Jones (incumbent)	10,116	44.81%
Total votes		22,591	100.0%
Republican gain from Democratic			

=== District 10 ===
Nevada's 10th Senate district election
Party	Candidate	Votes	%
Democratic	Ruben Kihuen (incumbent)	8,143	64.93%
Libertarian	Ed Uehling	4,409	35.07%
Total votes		12,552	100.0%
Democratic hold			

=== District 12 ===
Nevada's 12th Senate district election
Party	Candidate	Votes	%
Republican	Joe Hardy (incumbent)	28,657	100.0%
Total votes		28,657	100.0%
Republican hold			

=== District 13 ===
Nevada's 13th Senate district election
Party	Candidate	Votes	%
Democratic	Debbie Smith (incumbent)	12,943	60.57%
Republican	Thomas Koziol	8,432	39.43%
Total votes		21,375	100.0%
Democratic hold			

=== District 14 ===
Nevada's 14th Senate District Democratic Primary Election
Party	Candidate	Votes	%
Democratic	Joe Hunt	2,303	56.81%
Democratic	K.C. Harrison	1,751	43.19%
Total votes		4,054	100.0%

Nevada's 14th Senate district election
Party	Candidate	Votes	%
Republican	Don Gustavson (incumbent)	24,994	70.46%
Democratic	Joe Hunt	10,690	29.54%
Total votes		35,684	100.0%
Republican hold			

=== District 16 ===
Nevada's 16th Senate District Republican Primary Election
Party	Candidate	Votes	%
Republican	Ben Kieckhefer (incumbent)	8,144	66.73%
Republican	Gary Schmidt	4,060	33.27%
Total votes		12,204	100.0%

Nevada's 16th Senate district election
Party	Candidate	Votes	%
Republican	Ben Kieckhefer (incumbent)	27,225	66.61%
Democratic	Michael Kelley	12,021	29.47%
Constitution	John Everhart	2,691	6.61%
Total votes		41,937	100.0%
Republican hold			

=== District 17 ===
Nevada's 17th Senate district election
Party	Candidate	Votes	%
Republican	James Settelmeyer (incumbent)	35,979	100.0%
Total votes		35,979	100.0%
Republican hold			

=== District 20 ===
Nevada's 20th Senate District Republican Primary Election
Party	Candidate	Votes	%
Republican	Michael Roberson (incumbent)	3,009	58.54%
Republican	Bunce Carl	2,131	41.46%
Total votes		5,140	100.0%

Nevada's 20th Senate district election
Party	Candidate	Votes	%
Republican	Michael Roberson (incumbent)	16,715	61.32%
Democratic	Teresa Lowry	10,959	40.28%
Total votes		27,239	100.0%
Republican hold			

=== District 21 ===
Nevada's 21st Senate district election
Party	Candidate	Votes	%
Democratic	Mark Manendo (incumbent)	9,597	53.58%
Republican	Ron McGinnis	8,328	46.42%
Total votes		17,925	100.0%
Democratic hold			

== See also ==
- 2014 United States elections
- 2014 United States House of Representatives elections in Nevada
- 2014 Nevada elections
- 2014 Nevada State Assembly election
- List of Nevada state legislatures
