= 2024 United States House of Representatives elections in Nevada =

- November 5, 2024

All 4 Nevada seats to the United States House of Representatives
| | Majority party | Minority party | Third party |
|---|---|---|---|
| Party | Democratic | Republican | Independent |
| Last election | 3 | 1 | 0 |
| Seats won | 3 | 1 | 0 |
| Popular vote | 534,115 | 692,714 | 149,981 |
| Percentage | 37.43% | 48.54% | 10.51% |
| Swing | ▼10.19% | ▼2.52% | New |

Democratic
50–60%
Republican
40–50%
50–60%
60–70%
70–80%
80–90%

The 2024 United States House of Representatives elections in Nevada were held on November 5, 2024, to elect the four U.S. representatives from the State of Nevada, one from all four of the state's congressional districts. The elections coincided with the 2024 U.S. presidential election, elections from the other 49 states to the House of Representatives, elections to the United States Senate, and various state and local elections. The primary elections were held on June 11, 2024.

Despite receiving only 37.4% of the vote, far less than the 48.5% won by the Republican Party, Democrats won a majority of Nevada's districts. Nevada was notable for being the only state in which the party that won the popular vote still held a minority of congressional seats in 2024. The Nevada Independent partially attributed this to the impact of gerrymandering imposed by the Democratic-controlled Nevada Legislature in 2021. The disparity can also be partially attributed to the race in the 2nd District, where the Democrats did not run a candidate and the independent candidate was endorsed by incumbent Democratic U.S. Senator Jacky Rosen.

== Overview ==
=== Statewide ===
| Party | Candi- dates | Votes | | Seats | | |
| Party | Candi- dates | No. | % | No. | +/– | % |
|---|---|---|---|---|---|---|
| Democratic Party | 3 | 534,115 | 37.43% | 3 | Steady | 75% |
| Republican Party | 4 | 692,714 | 48.54% | 1 | Steady | 25% |
| Independent | 3 | 149,981 | 10.51% | 0 | Steady | 0% |
| Independent American Party | 3 | 27,439 | 1.92% | 0 | Steady | 0% |
| Libertarian Party | 3 | 22,828 | 1.60% | 0 | Steady | 0% |
| Total | 17 | 1,427,077 | 100% | 4 | Steady | 100% |

Popular vote
| Republican | 48.54% |
| Democratic | 37.43% |
| Independent | 10.51% |
| Other | 3.52% |

House seats
| Democratic | 75.00% |
| Republican | 25.00% |

=== District ===
| District | Democratic | | Republican | | Others | | Total | | Result |
| District | Votes | % | Votes | % | Votes | % | Votes | % | Result |
|---|---|---|---|---|---|---|---|---|---|
| District 1 | 167,885 | 51.99% | 143,650 | 44.49% | 11,364 | 3.52% | 322,899 | 100.0% | Democratic hold |
| District 2 | 0 | 0.00% | 219,919 | 55.04% | 179,665 | 44.96% | 399,584 | 100.0% | Republican hold |
| District 3 | 191,304 | 51.37% | 181,084 | 48.63% | 0 | 0.00% | 372,388 | 100.0% | Democratic hold |
| District 4 | 174,926 | 52.66% | 148,061 | 44.57% | 9,219 | 2.78% | 332,206 | 100.0% | Democratic hold |
| Total | 534,115 | 37.43% | 692,714 | 48.54% | 200,248 | 14.03% | 1,427,077 | 100.0% | |

== District 1 ==
2024 Nevada's 1st congressional district election
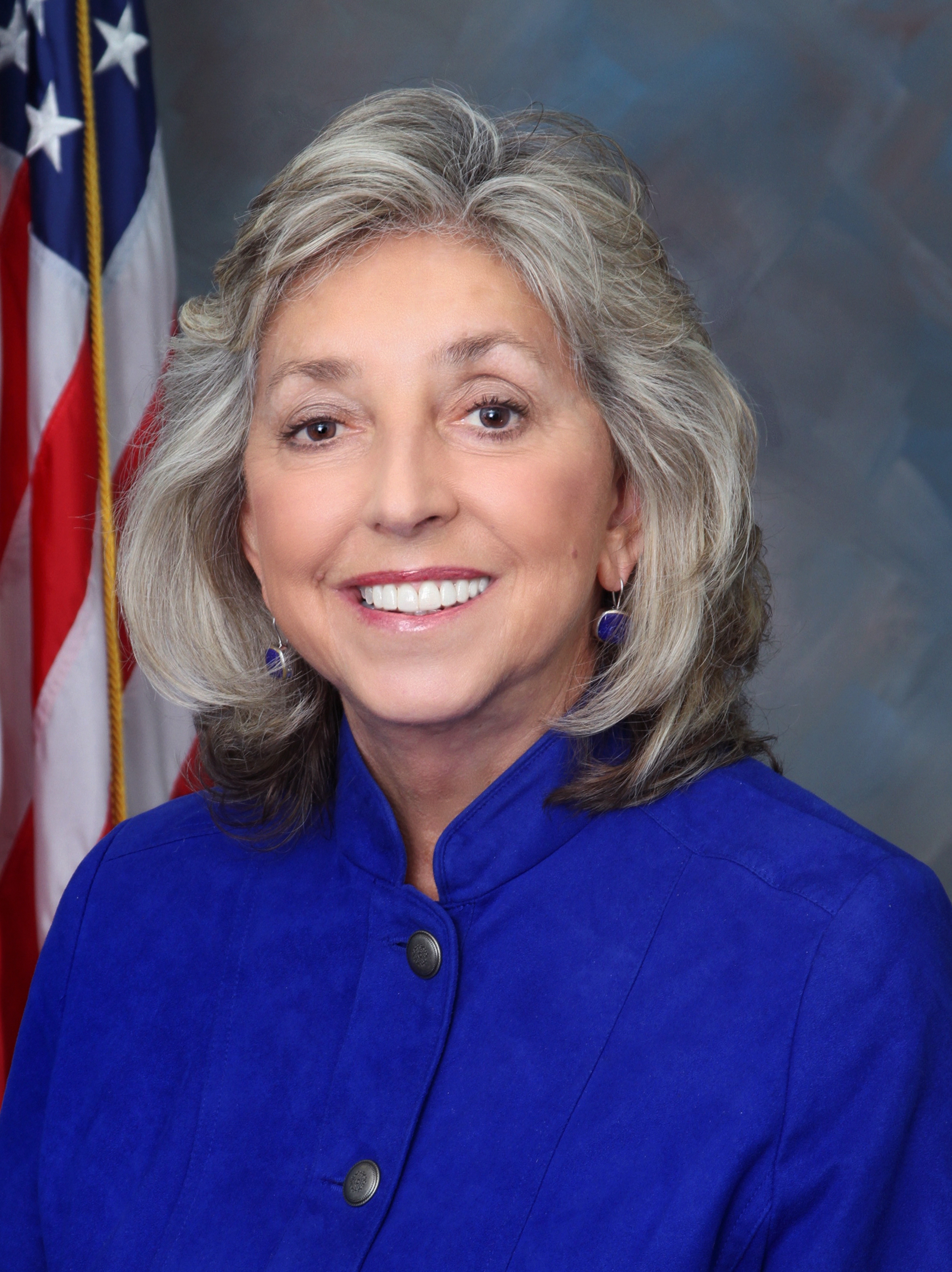

| Nominee | Dina Titus | Mark Robertson |
| Party | Democratic | Republican |
| Popular vote | 167,885 | 143,650 |
| Percentage | 52.0% | 44.5% |
- County results Titus: 50–60%
U.S. Representative before election
Dina Titus
Democratic
Elected U.S. Representative
Dina Titus
Democratic

The 1st District expands from inner Las Vegas towards its southeastern suburbs and some rural parts of Clark County, taking in the cities of Paradise, Henderson, and Boulder City. The incumbent was Democrat Dina Titus, who was reelected with 51.6% of the vote in 2022.

=== Democratic primary ===
==== Nominee ====
- Dina Titus, incumbent U.S. representative

==== Fundraising ====
Campaign finance reports as of May 22, 2024
| Candidate | Raised | Spent | Cash on hand |
|---|---|---|---|
| Dina Titus (D) | $1,230,619 | $348,284 | $1,055,536 |
Source: Federal Election Commission

=== Republican primary ===
==== Nominee ====
- Mark Robertson, professor and nominee for this district in 2022

==== Eliminated in primary ====
- Jim Blockey, retired teacher and candidate for this district in 1998 and 2000
- Michael Boris, appliance repair contractor and comedian
- Flemming Larsen, restaurateur
- Evan Stone, pornographic actor

==== Endorsements ====
Flemming Larsen

Organizations

- Americans for Prosperity

==== Fundraising ====
Campaign finance reports as of May 22, 2024
| Candidate | Raised | Spent | Cash on hand |
|---|---|---|---|
| Michael Boris (R) | $30,781 (Note: $23,992 of this total was self-funded by Boris) | $30,781 | $0 |
| Flemming Larsen (R) | $1,816,239 (Note: $1,500,000 of this total was self-funded by Larsen) | $441,886 | $1,374,352 |
| Mark Robertson (R) | $105,994 (Note: $12,647 of this total was self-funded by Robertson) | $204,706 | $70,318 |
Source: Federal Election Commission

==== Results ====
Republican primary results
| Party | Candidate | Votes | % |
|---|---|---|---|
| **Republican** | **Mark Robertson** | **14,102** | **48.2** |
| Republican | Flemming Larsen | 11,434 | 39.1 |
| Republican | Jim Blockey | 1,487 | 5.1 |
| Republican | Michael Boris | 1,279 | 4.4 |
| Republican | Evan Stone | 950 | 3.2 |
| Total votes | | **29,252** | **100.0** |

=== Third-party and independent candidates ===
==== Declared ====
- Gabriel Cornejo (Independent), businessman and Democratic candidate for president in 2024
- David Goossen (Independent), casino worker and perennial candidate
- David Havlicek (Libertarian)
- William Hoge (Independent American), former California state assemblyman, nominee for lieutenant governor in 2022, and nominee for state treasurer in 2018
- Ron Quince (Independent), business consultant
- Victor Willert (Independent), CPR instructor and Republican candidate for the 3rd district in 2020

==== Fundraising ====
Campaign finance reports as of March 31, 2024
| Candidate | Raised | Spent | Cash on hand |
|---|---|---|---|
| Ron Quince (I) | $48,492 (Note: $46,000 of this total was self-funded by Quince) | $52,270 | $465 |
Source: Federal Election Commission

=== General election ===
==== Endorsements ====
Endorsements in bold were made after the primary election.

William Hoge (IA)

Political parties

- Independent American Party of Nevada
Dina Titus

U.S representatives

- Gabby Giffords, U.S. representative from Arizona's 8th congressional district (2007–2012)

Organizations

- AIPAC
- Brady PAC
- Democratic Majority for Israel
- EMILY's List
- Everytown for Gun Safety Action Fund
- Feminist Majority PAC
- Giffords
- Humane Society Legislative Fund
- Jewish Democratic Council of America
- National Organization for Women PAC
- Natural Resources Defense Council
- NextGen America PAC
- Planned Parenthood Action Fund
- Population Connection Action Fund
- Sierra Club
- Silver State Equality

Labor unions

- AFSCME Nevada
- Association of Flight Attendants
- Culinary Workers Union
- LiUNA Local 872
- Nevada AFL-CIO

==== Polling ====
| Poll source | Date(s) administered | Sample size (Note: Key: A – all adults RV – registered voters LV – likely voters V – unclear) | Margin of error | Dina Titus (D) | Mark Robertson (R) | Other | Undecided |
|---|---|---|---|---|---|---|---|
| Emerson College (Note: Poll sponsored by The Hill) | August 25–28, 2024 | 280 (LV) | – | **47%** | 32% | 8% (Note: Havlicek (L) with 4%; "None of these Candidates" with 3%; Hoge (I) with 1%) | 13% |
| Morning Consult (Note: Poll sponsored by Bloomberg News) | August 3–5, 2024 | 211 (LV) | ± 7% | **44%** | 38% | 1% (Note: Havlicek (L) with 1%) | 17% |

==== Predictions ====
| Source | Ranking | As of |
|---|---|---|
| The Cook Political Report | Likely D | February 2, 2023 |
| Inside Elections | Solid D | October 10, 2024 |
| Sabato's Crystal Ball | Likely D | February 23, 2023 |
| Elections Daily | Likely D | September 7, 2023 |
| CNalysis | Likely D | November 16, 2023 |
| Decision Desk HQ | Safe D | October 11, 2024 |

==== Results ====
2024 Nevada's 1st congressional district election
| Party | Candidate | Votes | % |
|---|---|---|---|
| **Democratic** | **Dina Titus (incumbent)** | **167,885** | **52.0** |
| Republican | Mark Robertson | 143,650 | 44.5 |
| Independent | Ron Quince | 3,321 | 1.0 |
| Independent American | William Hoge | 2,736 | 0.8 |
| Libertarian | David Havlicek | 2,711 | 0.8 |
| Independent | David Goossen | 2,596 | 0.8 |
| Total votes | | **322,899** | **100.0** |
| Democratic **hold** | | | |

==== By county ====
| County | Dina Titus Democratic | | Mark Robertson Republican | | Various candidates Other parties | | Margin | | Total votes cast |
| County | # | % | # | % | # | % | # | % | Total votes cast |
|---|---|---|---|---|---|---|---|---|---|
| Clark (part) | 167,885 | 51.99% | 143,650 | 44.49% | 11,364 | 3.52% | 24,235 | 7.51% | 322,899 |
| Totals | 167,885 | 51.99% | 143,650 | 44.49% | 11,364 | 3.52% | 24,235 | 7.51% | 322,899 |

== District 2 ==
2024 Nevada's 2nd congressional district election
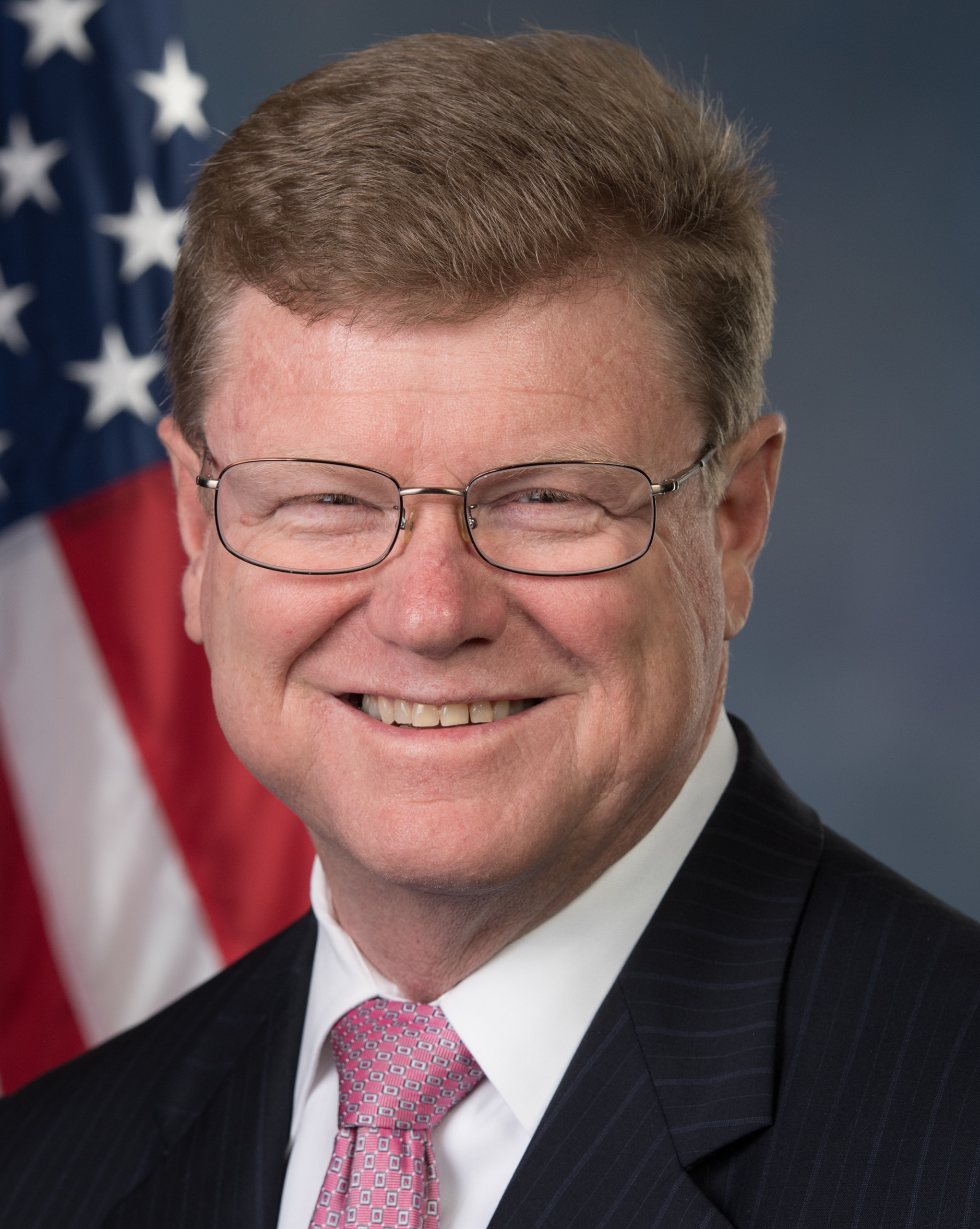

| Nominee | Mark Amodei | Greg Kidd |
| Party | Republican | Independent |
| Popular vote | 219,919 | 144,064 |
| Percentage | 55.0% | 36.1% |
- County results Amodei: 40–50% 50–60% 60–70% 70–80% 80–90% No votes
U.S. Representative before election
Mark Amodei
Republican
Elected U.S. Representative
Mark Amodei
Republican

The 2nd District spans northern Nevada, including the counties of Douglas, Elko, Eureka, Humboldt, Lander, Pershing, Storey, Washoe, and White Pine, plus most of Churchill and Lyon counties and a tiny portion of Lincoln County. It contains the cities of Reno, Sparks, and Carson City. The incumbent was Republican Mark Amodei, who was reelected with 59.7% of the vote in 2022.

=== Republican primary ===
==== Nominee ====
- Mark Amodei, incumbent U.S. representative

==== Eliminated in primary ====
- Fred Simon, doctor and candidate for governor of Nevada in 2022

==== Fundraising ====
Campaign finance reports as of May 22, 2024
| Candidate | Raised | Spent | Cash on hand |
|---|---|---|---|
| Mark Amodei (R) | $666,362 | $503,780 | $442,236 |
| Fred Simon (R) | $25,742 | $62,498 | $12,783 |
Source: Federal Election Commission

==== Results ====
2024 GOP primary results by county: 50–60% Amodei 60–70% Amodei 70–80% Amodei

Republican primary results
| Party | Candidate | Votes | % |
|---|---|---|---|
| **Republican** | **Mark Amodei (incumbent)** | **44,098** | **64.2** |
| Republican | Fred Simon | 24,592 | 35.8 |
| Total votes | | **68,690** | **100.0** |

=== Third-party and independent candidates ===
==== Declared ====
- Lynn Chapman (Independent American), treasurer of the Independent American Party of Nevada
- Greg Kidd (Independent), investor and former Federal Reserve senior analyst
- Javi Tachiquin (Libertarian), martial arts instructor and nominee for lieutenant governor in 2022

==== Fundraising ====
Campaign finance reports as of May 22, 2024
| Candidate | Raised | Spent | Cash on hand |
|---|---|---|---|
| Greg Kidd (I) | $1,000,261 (Note: $1,000,000 of this total was self-funded by Kidd) | $597,679 | $402,581 |
Source: Federal Election Commission

=== General election ===
==== Endorsements ====
Endorsements in bold were made after the primary election.

Mark Amodei (R)

Organizations

- AIPAC
Lynn Chapman (I)

Political parties

- Independent American Party of Nevada
Greg Kidd (I)

U.S. senators

- **Jacky Rosen**, Nevada (2019–present) (Democratic)

Political parties

- Forward Party

==== Polling ====
| Poll source | Date(s) administered | Sample size | Margin of error | Mark Amodei (R) | Lynn Chapman (IA) | Greg Kidd (I) | Other | Undecided |
|---|---|---|---|---|---|---|---|---|
| Emerson College | August 25–28, 2024 | 309 (LV) | – | **44%** | 6% | 13% | 6% (Note: "None of these candidates" with 5%; Tachiquin (L) with 1%) | 31% |
| Morning Consult | August 3–5, 2024 | 249 (LV) | ± 6% | **33%** | 3% | 29% | 2% (Note: Tachiquin (L) with 2%) | **34%** |
| Change Research (Note: Poll sponsored by the Kidd campaign) | March 9–12, 2024 | 735 (LV) | ± 3.9% | **44%** | – | 26% | 5% (Note: "Wouldn't Vote" with 5%) | 26% |

==== Predictions ====
| Source | Ranking | As of |
|---|---|---|
| The Cook Political Report | Solid R | February 2, 2023 |
| Inside Elections | Solid R | March 10, 2023 |
| Sabato's Crystal Ball | Safe R | February 23, 2023 |
| Elections Daily | Safe R | September 7, 2023 |
| CNalysis | Solid R | November 16, 2023 |
| Decision Desk HQ | Solid R | June 1, 2024 |

==== Results ====
2024 Nevada's 2nd congressional district election
| Party | Candidate | Votes | % |
|---|---|---|---|
| **Republican** | **Mark Amodei (incumbent)** | **219,919** | **55.0** |
| Independent | Greg Kidd | 144,064 | 36.1 |
| Independent American | Lynn Chapman | 19,784 | 5.0 |
| Libertarian | Javi Tachiquin | 15,817 | 4.0 |
| Total votes | | **399,584** | **100.0** |
| Republican **hold** | | | |

==== By county ====
| County | Mark Amodei Republican | | Greg Kidd Independent | | Various candidates Other parties | | Margin | | Total |
| County | # | % | # | % | # | % | # | % | Total |
|---|---|---|---|---|---|---|---|---|---|
| Carson City | 16,112 | 53.59% | 10,867 | 36.15% | 3,084 | 10.26% | 5,245 | 17.45% | 30,063 |
| Churchill | 8,949 | 69.03% | 3,199 | 24.68% | 815 | 6.29% | 5,750 | 44.36% | 12,963 |
| Douglas | 22,186 | 65.44% | 9,971 | 29.41% | 1,747 | 5.15% | 12,215 | 36.03% | 33,904 |
| Elko | 15,748 | 73.38% | 3,468 | 16.16% | 2,244 | 10.46% | 12,280 | 57.22% | 21,460 |
| Eureka | 825 | 83.00% | 112 | 11.27% | 57 | 5.73% | 713 | 71.73% | 994 |
| Humboldt | 5,630 | 72.64% | 1,594 | 20.57% | 527 | 6.80% | 4,036 | 52.07% | 7,751 |
| Lander | 1,875 | 70.73% | 553 | 20.86% | 223 | 8.41% | 1,322 | 49.87% | 2,651 |
| Lyon (part) | 21,137 | 66.29% | 8,435 | 26.45% | 2,313 | 7.25% | 12,702 | 39.84% | 31,885 |
| Pershing | 1,616 | 73.19% | 444 | 20.11% | 148 | 6.70% | 1,172 | 53.08% | 2,208 |
| Storey | 1,975 | 66.34% | 776 | 26.07% | 226 | 7.59% | 1,199 | 40.28% | 2,977 |
| Washoe | 120,780 | 48.59% | 103,987 | 41.83% | 23,806 | 9.58% | 16,793 | 6.76% | 248,573 |
| White Pine | 3,085 | 74.27% | 658 | 15.84% | 411 | 9.89% | 2,427 | 58.43% | 4,154 |
| Totals | 219,919 | 55.04% | 144,064 | 36.05% | 35,601 | 8.91% | 75,855 | 18.98% | 399,584 |

== District 3 ==
2024 Nevada's 3rd congressional district election
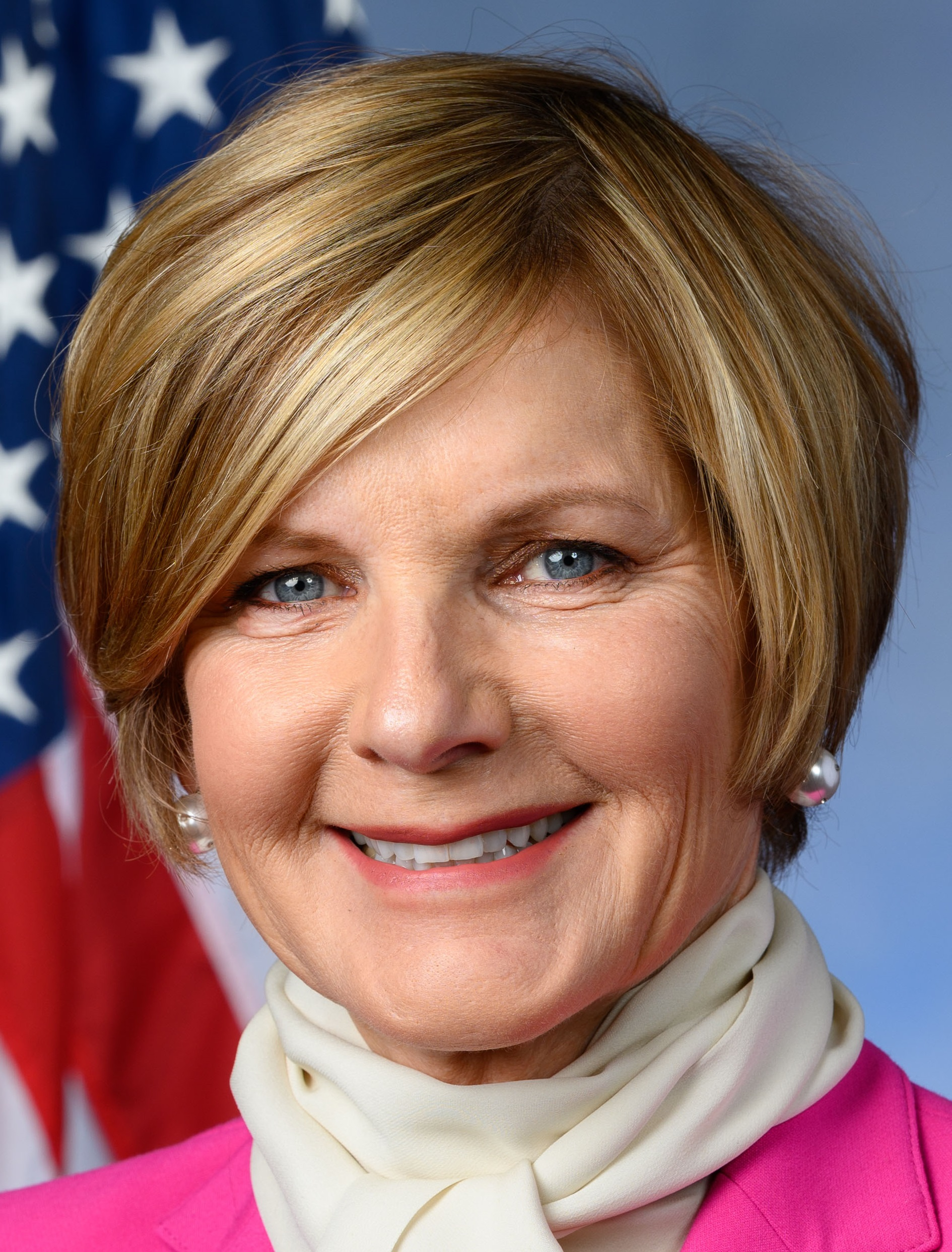

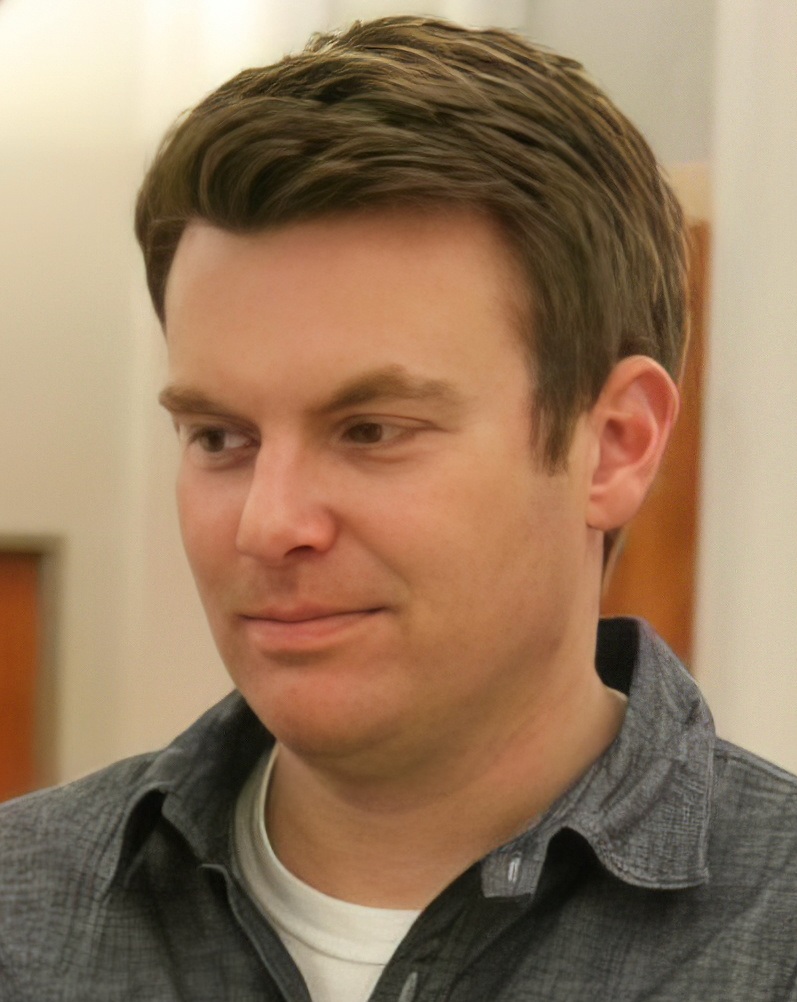
| Nominee | Susie Lee | Drew Johnson |
| Party | Democratic | Republican |
| Popular vote | 191,304 | 181,084 |
| Percentage | 51.4% | 48.6% |
- County results Lee: 50–60%
U.S. Representative before election
Susie Lee
Democratic
Elected U.S. Representative
Susie Lee
Democratic

The 3rd District comprises the western Las Vegas suburbs, including Spring Valley, Summerlin South, and Sandy Valley, and extends to the southernmost reaches of Clark County. The incumbent was Democrat Susie Lee, who was reelected with 52.0% of the vote in 2022.

=== Democratic primary ===
==== Nominee ====
- Susie Lee, incumbent U.S. representative

==== Eliminated in primary ====
- RockAthena Brittain, lounge singer

==== Fundraising ====
Campaign finance reports as of May 22, 2024
| Candidate | Raised | Spent | Cash on hand |
|---|---|---|---|
| Susie Lee (D) | $3,548,119 | $1,131,023 | $2,454,463 |
Source: Federal Election Commission

==== Results ====
Democratic primary results
| Party | Candidate | Votes | % |
|---|---|---|---|
| **Democratic** | **Susie Lee (incumbent)** | **33,901** | **91.8** |
| Democratic | RockAthena Brittain | 3,036 | 8.2 |
| Total votes | | **36,937** | **100.0** |

=== Republican primary ===
==== Nominee ====
- Drew Johnson, marketing consultant

==== Eliminated in primary ====
- Elizabeth Helgelien, former state senator from the 9th district (2010–2012)
- Steve London, accountant
- Brian Nadell, professional poker player and perennial candidate
- Martin O'Donnell, composer
- Steven Schiffman, attorney and perennial candidate
- Dan Schwartz, former Nevada state treasurer (2015–2019), candidate for this district in 2020, candidate for lieutenant governor in 2022, candidate for governor in 2018, and candidate for the 4th district in 2012

==== Withdrawn ====
- Heidi Kasama, state assemblywoman (2020–present) (ran for re-election)

==== Declined ====
- April Becker, attorney and nominee for this district in 2022 (ran for Clark County Commission)

==== Endorsements ====
Elizabeth Helgelien

U.S. representatives

- Matt Gaetz, FL-01 (2017–2024)
- Cory Mills, FL-07 (2023–present)
Drew Johnson

U.S. representatives

- Cresent Hardy, NV-04 (2015-2017)

Statewide officials

- Robert List, former governor of Nevada (1979–1983)
- Andy Matthews, Nevada state controller (2023–present)

State legislators

- Scott Hammond, state senator from the 18th district (2012–present)
- Jeff Stone, state senator from the 20th district (2022–present)
Martin O'Donnell

Statewide officials

- Joe Lombardo, governor of Nevada (2023–present)
Heidi Kasama (withdrawn)

U.S. representatives

- Kevin McCarthy, former U.S. representative from California's 20th congressional district (2007–2023) and former speaker of the House (2023)

Statewide officials

- ~~Joe Lombardo, governor of Nevada (2023–present)~~ (switched endorsement to O'Donnell after Kasama withdrew)

==== Fundraising ====
Campaign finance reports as of May 22, 2024
| Candidate | Raised | Spent | Cash on hand |
|---|---|---|---|
| Elizabeth Helgelien (R) | $282,035 (Note: $848 of this total was self-funded by Helgelien) | $257,921 | $24,113 |
| Drew Johnson (R) | $431,978 (Note: $300,000 of this total was self-funded by Johnson) | $333,446 | $98,532 |
| Marty O'Donnell (R) | $540,638 (Note: $500,000 of this total was self-funded by O'Donnell) | $508,909 | $31,728 |
| Dan Schwartz (R) | $921,903 (Note: $900,000 of this total was self-funded by Schwartz) | $548,026 | $373,877 |
Source: Federal Election Commission

==== Results ====
Republican primary results
| Party | Candidate | Votes | % |
|---|---|---|---|
| **Republican** | **Drew Johnson** | **10,519** | **32.0** |
| Republican | Dan Schwartz | 7,351 | 22.3 |
| Republican | Elizabeth Helgelien | 6,784 | 20.6 |
| Republican | Martin O'Donnell | 6,727 | 20.4 |
| Republican | Steven Schiffman | 594 | 1.8 |
| Republican | Steve London | 495 | 1.5 |
| Republican | Brian Nadell | 446 | 1.4 |
| Total votes | | **32,916** | **100.0** |

=== Third-party and independent candidates ===
==== Declared ====
- John Kamerath (Independent American), nurse

=== General election ===
==== Endorsements ====
Endorsements in bold were made after the primary election.

Drew Johnson (R)

U.S. representatives

- Cresent Hardy, NV-04 (2015-2017)

Statewide officials

- Robert List, former governor of Nevada (1979–1983)
- Andy Matthews, Nevada state controller (2023–present)

State legislators

- Scott Hammond, state senator from the 18th district (2012–present)
- Jeff Stone, state senator from the 20th district (2022–present)
Susie Lee (D)

U.S representatives

- Seth Moulton, U.S. representative from Massachusetts's 6th congressional district (2015–present)

Organizations

- AIPAC
- Asian American Action Fund
- Brady PAC
- Democratic Majority for Israel
- EMILY's List
- Everytown for Gun Safety Action Fund
- Feminist Majority PAC
- Giffords
- Humane Society Legislative Fund
- Jewish Democratic Council of America
- Joint Action Committee for Political Affairs
- League of Conservation Voters
- NARAL Pro-Choice America
- Natural Resources Defense Council
- NextGen America PAC
- Population Connection Action Fund
- Sierra Club
- Silver State Equality
- U.S. Chamber of Commerce

Labor unions

- AFSCME Nevada
- Culinary Workers Union
- LiUNA Local 872
- Nevada AFL-CIO

==== Polling ====
| Poll source | Date(s) administered | Sample size | Margin of error | Susie Lee (D) | Drew Johnson (R) | Other | Undecided |
|---|---|---|---|---|---|---|---|
| Emerson College | August 25–28, 2024 | 298 (LV) | – | **47%** | 35% | 4% (Note: "None of these Candidates" with 4%) | 14% |
| Morning Consult | August 3–5, 2024 | 297 (LV) | ± 6% | **49%** | 42% | – | 9% |

==== Predictions ====
| Source | Ranking | As of |
|---|---|---|
| The Cook Political Report | Lean D | February 2, 2023 |
| Inside Elections | Likely D | May 9, 2024 |
| Sabato's Crystal Ball | Likely D | February 23, 2023 |
| Elections Daily | Likely D | October 10, 2024 |
| CNalysis | Likely D | November 16, 2023 |
| Decision Desk HQ | Likely D | October 11, 2024 |

==== Results ====
2024 Nevada's 3rd congressional district election
| Party | Candidate | Votes | % |
|---|---|---|---|
| **Democratic** | **Susie Lee (incumbent)** | **191,304** | **51.4** |
| Republican | Drew Johnson | 181,084 | 48.6 |
| Total votes | | **372,388** | **100.0** |
| Democratic **hold** | | | |

==== By county ====
| County | Susie Lee Democratic | | Drew Johnson Republican | | Margin | | Total votes cast |
| County | # | % | # | % | # | % | Total votes cast |
|---|---|---|---|---|---|---|---|
| Clark (part) | 191,304 | 51.37% | 181,084 | 48.63% | 10,220 | 2.74% | 372,388 |
| Totals | 191,304 | 51.37% | 181,084 | 48.63% | 10,220 | 2.74% | 372,388 |

== District 4 ==
2024 Nevada's 4th congressional district election
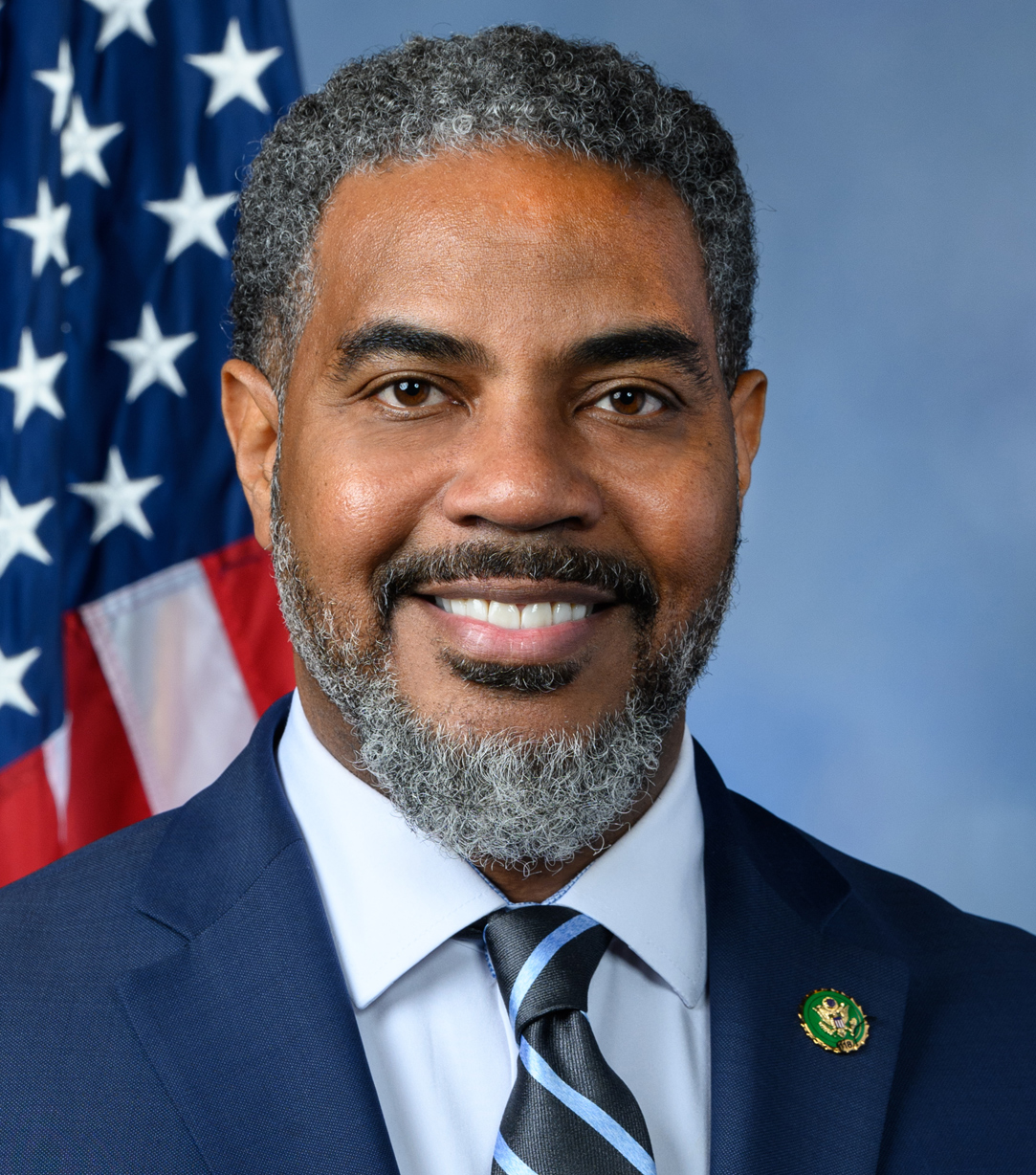

| Nominee | Steven Horsford | John Lee |
| Party | Democratic | Republican |
| Popular vote | 174,926 | 148,061 |
| Percentage | 52.7% | 44.6% |
- County results Lee: 60–70% 70–80% 80–90% Horsford: 50–60% No votes
U.S. Representative before election
Steven Horsford
Democratic
Elected U.S. Representative
Steven Horsford
Democratic

The 4th District covers northern Clark County, taking in the Las Vegas Strip and the northern suburbs of Las Vegas, and rural central Nevada, including the counties of Esmeralda, Mineral, and Nye, plus part of Lyon County, nearly all of Lincoln County, and a tiny portion of Churchill County. The incumbent was Democrat Steven Horsford, who was reelected with 52.4% of the vote in 2022.

=== Democratic primary ===
==== Nominee ====
- Steven Horsford, incumbent U.S. representative

==== Eliminated in primary ====
- Levy Shultz, industrial security professional

==== Fundraising ====
Campaign finance reports as of May 22, 2024
| Candidate | Raised | Spent | Cash on hand |
|---|---|---|---|
| Steven Horsford (D) | $3,381,045 | $1,586,015 | $1,857,132 |
Source: Federal Election Commission

==== Results ====
Democratic primary results
| Party | Candidate | Votes | % |
|---|---|---|---|
| **Democratic** | **Steven Horsford (incumbent)** | **34,861** | **89.5** |
| Democratic | Levy Shultz | 4,084 | 10.5 |
| Total votes | | **38,945** | **100.0** |

=== Republican primary ===
==== Nominee ====
- John Lee, former mayor of North Las Vegas (2013–2022), former state senator from the 1st district (2004–2012), candidate for governor in 2022, and Democratic candidate for this district in 2012

==== Eliminated in primary ====
- David Flippo, financial advisor
- Bruce Frazey, certified public accountant and consultant

==== Endorsements ====
David Flippo

U.S. representatives

- Cresent Hardy, former U.S. representative from Nevada's 4th congressional district (2015–2017)
Bruce Frazey

Newspapers

- Las Vegas Sun (Republican primary only)
John Lee

Federal officials

- Donald Trump, former president of the United States (2017–2021)

Statewide officials

- Joe Lombardo, governor of Nevada (2023–present)

==== Fundraising ====
Campaign finance reports as of May 22, 2024
| Candidate | Raised | Spent | Cash on hand |
|---|---|---|---|
| David Flippo (R) | $927,333 (Note: $52,500 of this total was self-funded by Flippo) | $878,667 | $48,665 |
| John Lee (R) | $851,322 (Note: $500,000 of this total was self-funded by Lee) | $750,929 | $100,392 |
Source: Federal Election Commission

==== Results ====
Republican primary results
| Party | Candidate | Votes | % |
|---|---|---|---|
| **Republican** | **John Lee** | **16,699** | **48.2** |
| Republican | David Flippo | 15,678 | 45.3 |
| Republican | Bruce Frazey | 2,241 | 6.5 |
| Total votes | | **34,618** | **100.0** |

=== Third-party and independent candidates ===
==== Declared ====
- Russell Best (Independent American), retired businessman and perennial candidate
- Timothy Ferreira (Libertarian), software developer and candidate for lieutenant governor of California in 2018

=== General election ===
==== Endorsements ====
Endorsements in bold were made after the primary election.

Russell Best (IA)

Political parties

- Independent American Party of Nevada
John Lee (R)

Federal officials

- Donald Trump, former president of the United States (2017–2021)

Statewide officials

- Joe Lombardo, governor of Nevada (2023–present)
Steven Horsford (D)

Statewide officials

- Gretchen Whitmer, governor of Michigan (2019-present)

U.S representatives

- Gabby Giffords, U.S. representative from Arizona's 8th congressional district (2007–2012)

Organizations

- AIPAC
- Brady PAC
- Democratic Majority for Israel
- End Citizens United
- Everytown for Gun Safety Action Fund
- Giffords
- Humane Society Legislative Fund
- Jewish Democratic Council of America
- Joint Action Committee for Political Affairs
- NARAL Pro-Choice America
- National Organization for Women PAC
- Natural Resources Defense Council
- NextGen America PAC
- Planned Parenthood Action Fund
- Population Connection Action Fund
- Sierra Club
- Silver State Equality

Labor unions

- AFSCME Nevada
- Culinary Workers Union
- LiUNA Local 872
- Nevada AFL-CIO

==== Polling ====
| Poll source | Date(s) administered | Sample size | Margin of error | Steven Horsford (D) | John Lee (R) | Other | Undecided |
|---|---|---|---|---|---|---|---|
| Emerson College | August 25–28, 2024 | 281 (LV) | – | **46%** | 36% | 8% (Note: Best (I) with 4%; Ferreira (L) with 2%; "None of these Candidates" with 2%) | 10% |
| Morning Consult | August 3–5, 2024 | 234 (LV) | ± 6% | **43%** | 39% | 1% (Note: Ferreira (L) with 1%; Best (I) with <1%) | 16% |

==== Predictions ====
| Source | Ranking | As of |
|---|---|---|
| The Cook Political Report | Likely D | February 2, 2023 |
| Inside Elections | Solid D | October 18, 2024 |
| Sabato's Crystal Ball | Likely D | February 23, 2023 |
| Elections Daily | Likely D | September 7, 2023 |
| CNalysis | Likely D | November 16, 2023 |
| Decision Desk HQ | Likely D | June 1, 2024 |

==== Results ====
2024 Nevada's 4th congressional district election
| Party | Candidate | Votes | % |
|---|---|---|---|
| **Democratic** | **Steven Horsford (incumbent)** | **174,926** | **52.7** |
| Republican | John Lee | 148,061 | 44.6 |
| Independent American | Russell Best | 4,919 | 1.5 |
| Libertarian | Timothy Ferreira | 4,300 | 1.3 |
| Total votes | | **332,206** | **100.0** |
| Democratic **hold** | | | |

==== By county ====
| County | Steven Horsford Democratic | | John Lee Republican | | Various candidates Other parties | | Margin | | Total |
| County | # | % | # | % | # | % | # | % | Total |
|---|---|---|---|---|---|---|---|---|---|
| Clark (part) | 165,576 | 55.10% | 126,638 | 42.15% | 8,266 | 2.75% | 38,938 | 12.96% | 300,480 |
| Esmeralda | 68 | 16.92% | 317 | 78.86% | 17 | 4.23% | −249 | −61.94% | 402 |
| Lincoln | 346 | 14.37% | 2,008 | 83.42% | 53 | 2.20% | −1,662 | −69.05% | 2,407 |
| Lyon (part) | 37 | 16.89% | 179 | 81.74% | 3 | 1.37% | −142 | −64.84% | 219 |
| Mineral | 766 | 34.44% | 1,360 | 61.15% | 98 | 4.41% | −594 | −26.71% | 2,224 |
| Nye | 8,133 | 30.72% | 17,559 | 66.33% | 782 | 2.95% | −9,426 | −35.60% | 26,474 |
| Totals | 174,926 | 52.66% | 148,061 | 44.57% | 9,219 | 2.78% | 26,865 | 8.09% | 332,206 |

== Notes ==
Partisan clients
