= Becky Harris =

American politician (born 1968)

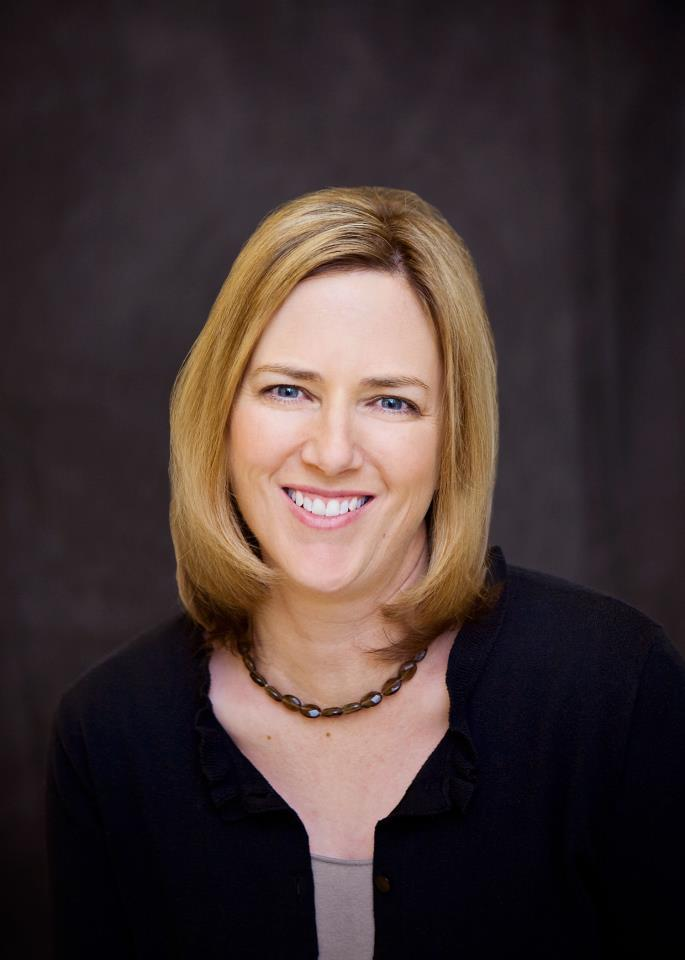

Chairwoman of the Nevada Gaming Control Board
- In office January 22, 2018 – January 27, 2019
- Appointed by: Brian Sandoval
- Preceded by: A.G. Burnett
- Succeeded by: Sandra Douglass Morgan

Member of the Nevada Senate from the 9th district
- In office November 5, 2014 – January 16, 2018
- Preceded by: Justin Jones
- Succeeded by: Melanie Scheible

Personal details
- Born: 1968 (age 57–58) Provo, Utah, United States
- Party: Non paritisian (since 2025)
- Other political affiliations: Republican (before 2025) Democratic (before 2004)
- Spouse: R. Garth Harris
- Children: 2
- Education: Brigham Young University (BA, JD); University of Nevada, Las Vegas (MA, LLM)
- Website: Official website

Becky Harris is an American attorney, academic, former politician, and gaming regulator. She is a registered non-partisan and is currently running for Clark County Commission District F.

Harris has previously served as a Republican member of the Nevada Senate from 2014 to 2018 and as chair of the Nevada Gaming Control Board from 2018 to 2019, becoming the first woman to hold the position. She is a Distinguished Fellow in Gaming and Leadership at the University of Nevada, Las Vegas (UNLV) and a visiting professor at the William S. Boyd School of Law, where she teaches courses in gaming law and regulation.

== Education ==
Harris earned a Bachelor of Arts degree in political science and French from Brigham Young University and a Juris Doctor from the J. Reuben Clark Law School at Brigham Young University. She later received a master's degree in political science from the University of Nevada, Las Vegas and a Master of Laws degree in gaming law and regulation from the William S. Boyd School of Law.

== Political career ==
Harris was elected to the Nevada Senate in 2014, representing the 9th district. During the 2015 legislative session, she chaired the Senate Education Committee and participated in the development of education legislation that was characterized at the time as a major reform package. She subsequently served as Republican co-caucus policy coordinator and held assignments on the Senate Judiciary, Finance, Education, and Commerce, Labor and Energy committees.

Harris resigned from the Senate in January 2018 after being appointed chair of the Nevada Gaming Control Board. Her resignation created a vacancy in Senate District 9 during the 2018 election cycle.

=== Nevada Gaming Control Board ===
In 2018, Harris was appointed chair of the Nevada Gaming Control Board, becoming the first woman to lead the agency. She served as chair from 2018 to 2019. The board regulates commercial gaming in Nevada and oversees licensing and regulatory matters involving the state's gaming industry.

Her tenure coincided with increased national attention to the regulation of sports wagering following the 2018 repeal of the federal prohibition on state-authorized sports betting. Harris was navigated regulatory issues arising from the expansion of sports betting following the repeal of the Professional and Amateur Sports Protection Act, the relationship between legalized recreational cannabis and gaming regulation, sexual-harassment issues in the gaming industry, and questions concerning the federal Wire Act.

Harris subsequently became a commentator and author on sports-betting regulation, including through her work at the International Gaming Institute at UNLV.

=== Clark County Commission ===
Harris is a candidate in the 2026 Clark County Commission election for District F as an independent, where she is running against Democratic nominee Minja Yan and Republican nominee Heidi Kasama.

== Academic and professional career ==
Harris has been associated with UNLV in several academic and professional capacities. She is currently a Distinguished Fellow in Gaming and Leadership with Lifelong Learning at UNLV and a visiting professor at the William S. Boyd School of Law. Her areas of teaching and research include gaming policy, gaming regulation, sports betting, legislative affairs, casino law, and anti-money-laundering regulation and workforce development.

At Boyd Law, Harris teaches the Gaming Law and Policy Seminar, Anti-Money Laundering in Gaming Law, and Resort Hotel Casino Law. Her work also includes education and training involving gambling regulators and other participants in the gaming regulatory system.

Harris has also worked with UNLV's International Center for Gaming Regulation and has participated in research and educational programs concerning sports betting, esports, gambling regulation, and workforce development.

In addition to her academic work, Harris is a commissioner of the Uniform Law Commission. Her work with the organization has included participation in committees dealing with college-athlete name, image and likeness issues, electronic wills, common-interest ownership, virtual currency consumer protection, and deepfake-related legislation.

Harris served as a non-executive director of PointsBet Holdings, an Australian sports-betting company, from 2019 until October 2025. She left the board following the company's acquisition by MIXI Australia and the subsequent reconstitution of its board. PointsBet announced the resignation of Harris and four other directors in October 2025.

== Selected publications ==
- Harris, Becky (2020-09-16). "Federal Interference with State and Tribal Sports Betting Regulations Will Not Work: Where the Sports Wagering Integrity Act of 2018 Went Wrong and How Federal Legislation Might Be Effective". Journal of Legal Aspects of Sport. 30 (2): 106–141. doi:10.18060/24253. ISSN 2325-2162.
- Harris, Becky (2019-10-01). "ADOPTING GAMING REGULATIONS TO ADDRESS CRITICAL SOCIAL ISSUES: SEXUAL HARASSMENT PREVENTION AND BEYOND". Gaming Law Review. 23 (8): 578–584. doi:10.1089/glr2.2019.2389. ISSN 2572-5300.
- Harris, Becky; Alikhan, Husna (2019-11-01). "PART I: NEVADA, OVER 60 YEARS REGULATING GAMBLING—A JURISDICTIONAL OVERVIEW". Gaming Law Review. 23 (9): 645–657. doi:10.1089/glr2.2019.2393. ISSN 2572-5300.
- Harris, Becky; Alikhan, Husna (2019-12-01). "Part II: Nevada, Over 60 Years Regulating Gambling—A Jurisdictional Overview". Gaming Law Review. 23 (10): 735–751. doi:10.1089/glr2.2019.23106. ISSN 2572-5300.
- Harris, Becky (2020-01-01). "Regulated Sports Betting: A Nevada Perspective". UNLV Gaming Law Journal. 10 (1): 75–104.
- Harris, Becky (2020-08-26). "Federal Interference with State and Tribal Sports Betting Regulations Will Not Work: Where the Sports Wagering Integrity Act of 2018 Went Wrong and How Federal Legislation Might Be Effective". Journal of Legal Aspects of Sport. 30 (2): 106–141. doi:10.18060/24253. ISSN 2325-2162.
- Harris, Becky; Alikhan, Husna (2020-02-01). "PART III: NEVADA, OVER 60 YEARS REGULATING GAMBLING—A JURISDICTIONAL OVERVIEW". Gaming Law Review. 24 (1): 16–41. doi:10.1089/glr2.2020.2411. ISSN 2572-5300.
- Harris, Becky; Holden, John (2022-10-15). "Reshaping College Athlete Sports Betting Education". BYU Law Review. 47 (2): 389–449. ISSN 2162-8572.
- Harris, Becky; Coley, Bill; Gan, Peter; Nguyen, Anh-Vu (2022-06-01). "MONETIZED COMPETITIVE PEER-TO-PEER SKILL-BASED GAME PLAY–AN INTRODUCTION". Gaming Law Review. 26 (5): 292–302. doi:10.1089/glr2.2022.0022. ISSN 2572-5300.
- Harris, Becky; Holden, John T.; Fried, Gil (2024-02-29). The Business of Sports Betting. Human Kinetics. ISBN 978-1-7182-1724-9.
- Harris, Becky; Dassopoulos, Andrea (2024-07-10). "Nevada Workforce Diversity, Equity, and Inclusion Study 2024". International Gaming Institute Faculty Research: 1–75.
- Harris, Becky (2025-03-21). "Esports: Women, Harassment, and Paving the Way for Equity". International Gaming Institute Faculty Research: 1–22.

== Personal life ==
Harris and her husband, R. Garth Harris, have two children: Sydney and Mallory. She is a member of the Church of Jesus Christ of Latter-day Saints.

== Electoral history ==
Nevada Assembly District 21 Republican primary, 2012
Party	Candidate	Votes	%
Republican	Becky Harris	1,341	63.17
Republican	Swadeep Nigam	456	21.46
Republican	Jeff Jones	326	15.36
Total votes		2,123	100.00

Nevada Assembly District 21 election, 2012
Party	Candidate	Votes	%
Democratic	Andy Eisen	12,123	50.07
Republican	Becky Harris	11,343	46.85
Independent American	Les McKay	745	3.08
Total votes		24,211	100.00

Nevada Senate District 9 Republican primary, 2014
Party	Candidate	Votes	%
Republican	Becky Harris	1,830	50.26
Republican	Vick Gill	1,452	39.88
Republican	David J. Schoen	206	5.66
Republican	Ron Q. Quilang	153	4.20
Total votes		3,641	100.00

Nevada Senate District 9 election, 2014
Party	Candidate	Votes	%
Republican	Becky Harris	12,475	55.22
Democratic	Justin Jones	10,116	44.78
Total votes		22,591	100.00
