= 2026 Nevada Senate election =

- November 3, 2026

11 of the 21 seats in the Nevada Senate 11 seats needed for a majority
	Majority party	Minority party
Leader	Nicole Cannizzaro	Robin Titus
Party	Democratic	Republican
Leader since	March 5, 2019	January 17, 2024
Leader's seat	6th	17th
Last election	13	8
Seats before	13	8
Seats won	13	8
Seat change	Steady	Steady
Senate Majority Leader before election
Nicole Cannizzaro
Democratic
Elected Senate Majority Leader
Democratic

The 2026 Nevada Senate election was held on November 3, 2026, alongside the other 2026 United States elections. It was held with the 2026 Nevada Assembly election. Voters elected members of the Nevada Senate in 11 of the U.S. state of Nevada's 21 legislative districts to serve a four-year term.

== Predictions ==
Source	Ranking	As of
Sabato's Crystal Ball	Safe D	October 16, 2026
State Navigate	Likely D	October 24, 2026

== District 2 ==
=== Declared ===
- Edgar Flores, incumbent senator (2022–present)
- Isaac Barron

=== Results ===
Democratic primary results - Nevada Senate District 2
Party	Candidate	Votes	%
Democratic	Edgar Flores (incumbent)	2,985	54.46
Democratic	Isaac Barron	2,496	45.54
Total		5,481	100

=== General election ===
There are not any challengers to Senator Flores in the general election.

== District 8 ==
=== Declared ===
- Laz Chavez
- George E. Harris

=== Results ===
Republican primary results - Nevada Senate District 8
Party	Candidate	Votes	%
Republican	George E. Harris	4,340	58.91
Republican	Katrin "Mrs. Fix It" Ivanoff	3,027	41.099
Total		7,367	100

=== General election ===
Incumbent Marilyn Dondero Loop is being challenged by Republican George E. Harris and Steven S. "Mr. Fix It" Cohen, who is not affiliated with any political party.

== District 9 ==
=== General election ===
Incumbent Democratic state senator Melanie Scheible is being challenged by Republican Maria Thompson.

== District 10 ==
=== General election ===
Democratic state senator Fabian Donate is running unopposed.

== District 12 ==
=== General election ===
Incumbent Democratic state senator Julie Pazina is being challenged by Republican Rafael Arroyo-Montalvo.

== District 13 ==
=== General election ===
Incumbent Democratic state senator Skip Daly is being challenged by both Republican Matthew Buehler and Charlene Young, a member of the American Independent Party.

== District 14 ==
=== General election ===
Incumbent Republican state senator Ira Hansen is running unopposed.

== District 16 ==
=== Declared ===
- Lisa Krasner, incumbent senator (2022-Present)
- Monica Jaye Stabbert

=== Results ===
Republican primary results - Nevada Senate District 8
Party	Candidate	Votes	%
Republican	Lisa Krasner (incumbent)	13,388	69.76
Republican	Monica Jaye Stabbert	5,804	30.24
Total		19,192	100

=== General election ===
Lisa Krasner is being challenged by Democrat Chrystal Roll.

== District 17 ==
Incumbent Republican state senator Robin Titus is being challenged by Democrat Lynne Ballatore.

== District 20 ==
Incumbent Republican state senator, Jeff Stone, will not appear on the ballot. Republican Danielle Gallant and Democrat Calvin Sandoval are competing for the seat.

== District 21 ==
=== Declared ===
- James Ohrenschall, incumbent senator (2018-Present)
- Junior Romero

=== Results ===
Democratic primary results - Nevada Senate District 21
Party	Candidate	Votes	%
Democratic	James Ohrenschall (incumbent)	3,641	52.95
Democratic	Junior Romero	3,235	47.05
Total		6,876	100

=== General election ===
Incumbent Democratic state senator James Ohrenschall is being challenged by Republican Al Rojas.
