= Dennis Nolan (politician) =

American politician

Member of the Nevada Senate from the Clark 9th district
- In office 2003 – 2 November 2010
- Succeeded by: Elizabeth Halseth

Personal details
- Born: March 20, 1961 (age 65) Las Vegas, Nevada
- Party: Republican
- Spouse: Kim

Dennis Nolan was a Republican member of the Nevada Senate, representing Clark County District 9 since 2002. Previously he served in the Nevada Assembly from 1994 through 2001. Nolan served as minority whip in the assembly, and in 2001 and 2003 was elected to be the assistant majority leader of the Nevada Senate. During his tenure in the senate, Nolan focused on issues such as healthcare, transportation, "reasonable property taxation," child and victim protection, workers compensation, public safety, and homeland security. In addition to his leadership roles with the Nevada Legislature, Nolan held leadership positions in two national legislative organizations; the American Legislative Exchange Council (ALEC) and the National Conference of State Legislators (NCSL). ALEC awarded him with its national legislator of the year award in 2008.

In 2010, Nolan lost his re-election bid, losing in the primaries to Elizabeth Halseth. The campaign against Nolan focused on a May 2010 incident in which Nolan was caught on tape offering to make it "very financially beneficial" if Jaime Anderson Lawes "told the truth" regarding a 2008 rape case involving her ex-husband, Gordon Lawes, then 21 and her sister, who was 16 years old at the time. The age of sexual consent in Nevada is 16. Gordon Lawes who contended the sex was consensual, was eventually convicted and sentenced to at least 10 years in prison. Senator Nolan himself was subpoenaed by the public defender and testified as a character witness, and it was revealed that both had played for the same hockey team. Nolan had defended his actions, saying that his political opponents focused on one message, while the other two messages "were of me imploring this woman" to voluntarily come forward and tell the truth. A legal opinion by the Nevada Legislative Counsel Bureau and review by the Nevada Ethics Commission determined Nolan violated no laws or ethics standards by his actions. Nolan knew both Jaime Anderson and her sister through Lawes and indicated that he was convinced the sex was consensual and both women were lying. Nolan added, "I realize my tactics in this case were somewhat unorthodox, but I never have really cared to be politically correct...what he did was wrong in every sense of the word but not illegal." The Nevada Supreme Court ultimately reversed Lawes conviction citing several procedural errors by the prosecution and court in obtaining the conviction. The Washington Examiner 2/5/2011 and The Las Vegas Sun 2/4/2011

Nolan has three children, and his hobbies include bagpipe playing, ice hockey, and scuba diving. He owns Nolan and Associates, a Nevada-based consulting firm and is the executive director of the Las Vegas International Celtic Festival.
