= Minja Yan =

American commercial real estate professional and politician

Minja Yan (born 1996 or 1997) is an American commercial real estate professional and politician from Las Vegas, Nevada. A member of the Democratic Party, she is the commissioner-elect for the District F seat on the Clark County Commission. Before running for office, she worked in commercial real estate and served as a project consultant on Clark County's redevelopment plan for the Las Vegas Chinatown area. Her win in the Democratic primary for the Clark County Commission in 2026 as a progressive candidate was seen as an upset, and she went on to win the general election.

== Early life and education ==
Yan grew up in Las Vegas after immigrating from China at age 11 and was a valedictorian from Desert Oasis High School in 2014. She earned a Bachelor of Science in accounting from the University of Nevada, Las Vegas (UNLV) in 2016 and a Master of Science in real estate, with a concentration in finance and investment, from New York University.

== Career ==
Yan is a commercial real estate professional at Millennium Commercial Properties in Las Vegas and has taught as an adjunct instructor at UNLV's Lied Institute for Real Estate. In 2023, she established a real estate scholarship at UNLV's business school to support first-generation students studying real estate. As part of her work at Millennium, she helped to lead their efforts to buy old motels in the city and convert them to affordable housing. Clark County launched an initiative in 2024 to revitalize the Las Vegas Chinatown district branded "Inspiring Spring Mountain." The county utilized a team that included Yan to lead the effort, with Yan serving as a project consultant.

Yan was listed by Business Insider as one of the "30 rising stars of real estate" in 2021. She has held leadership roles with the Urban Land Institute, including as chair of its Women's Leadership Initiative in Nevada. She was listed as one of Commercial Real Estate Women of Las Vegas's new board members in 2022. In April 2025, she gave a talk on preserving historic Chinatowns at TEDxLasVegas. She began a commercial real-estate podcast called Creative Talks, which she targeted at millennials in the field and interviewed experts about development.

== 2026 Clark County Commission campaign ==
Yan was the Democratic nominee for the District F seat on the Clark County Commission, an open seat after incumbent Democrat Justin Jones chose not to seek reelection. Yan has argued that Clark County's infrastructure has not kept pace with the area's rapid growth and has called for expanding the county's community housing fund to boost housing availability. She also supports a county light rail system and pedestrian-friendly infrastructure in her district. She has pledged not to accept any corporate or corporate PAC money for her campaign.

In the June 2026 Democratic primary, she won the nomination with about 37% of the vote in a seven-candidate field, defeating Minddie Lloyd, who had been endorsed by Jones and other sitting commissioners. The Las Vegas Review-Journal described the result as a "surprise" and the Nevada Independent described it as an upset. Yan credited her campaign's volunteer-driven grassroots campaign for her success in the primary. In the November 2026 general election, Yan faced Republican Nevada Assemblymember Heidi Kasama and independent Becky Harris, a former Republican state senator and the former chair of the Nevada Gaming Control Board.

Yan won the general election with 53.5% of the vote over Kasama's 39.1% and Harris's 7.4%.
