= Michelle Gorelow =

American politician

Member of the Nevada Assembly from the 35th district
- In office November 7, 2018 – November 6, 2024
- Preceded by: Justin Watkins
- Succeeded by: Rebecca Edgeworth

Personal details
- Born: 1971 (age 54–55) Decatur, Indiana, U.S.
- Party: Democratic
- Spouse: Andrew Gorelow
- Education: Wilmington College (BA); University of Phoenix (MEd)
- Website: Michelle Gorelow

Michelle Suzanne Gorelow (born 1971) is an American politician who served as a member of the Nevada Assembly from the 35th district.

== Early life and education ==
Gorelow was born in 1971 in Decatur, Indiana. Gorelow earned a B.A. in biology from Wilmington College in Wilmington, Ohio and an M.Ed. in education from the University of Phoenix in Las Vegas.

== Career ==
Gorelow has been and is involved with multiple initiatives to improve the health of children in Nevada. Gorelow has served on the Nevada Maternal and Child Health Coalition Steering Committee since 2008, and served as co-chair from 2014 to 2018. Gorelow served on the Nevada Governor's Association Improving Birth Outcomes from 2013 to 2016. In 2018, Gorelow was elected to the Nevada Assembly, where she had been representing the 35th district since November 7, 2018.

== Personal life ==
Michelle Gorelow is married to Andrew Gorelow. They have two children.
