= Justin Jones (Nevada politician) =

American politician (born 1974)

Justin C. Jones
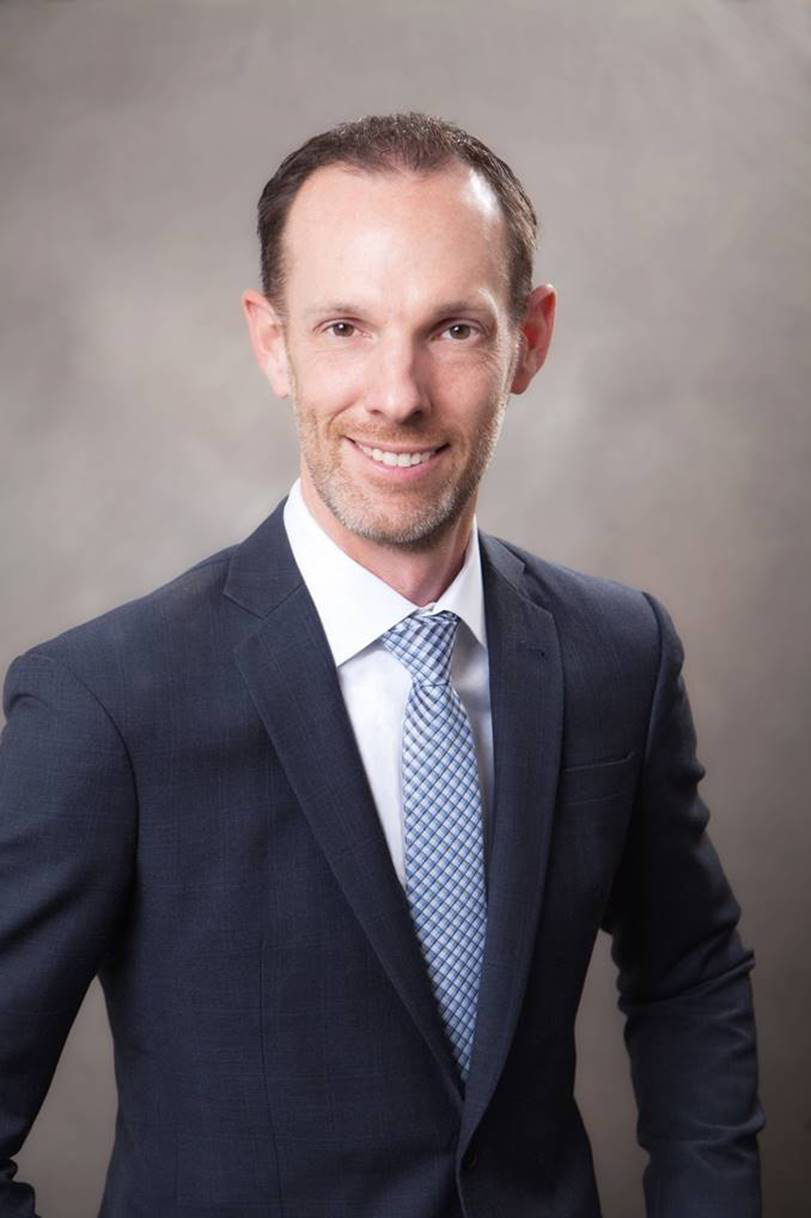

Vice Chair of the Clark County Commission
- In office January 4, 2022 – May 17, 2023
- Preceded by: James B. Gibson

Member of the Clark County Commission from District F
- Incumbent
- Assumed office January 1, 2019
- Preceded by: Susan Brager

Member of the Nevada Senate from the 9th district
- In office 6 November 2012 – 5 November 2014
- Preceded by: Elizabeth Halseth
- Succeeded by: Becky Harris

Personal details
- Born: Justin Christopher Jones; November 19, 1974 (age 51) Granada Hills, Los Angeles, California, United States
- Party: Democratic (2001–present)
- Spouse: Megan K. Jones
- Children: 2
- Education: Brigham Young University (B.A.); George Washington University Law School (J.D.)
- Occupation: Attorney, politician
- Website: http://www.jonesfornevada.com/

Justin Christopher Jones (born November 19, 1974) is an American attorney and politician. He is currently the Clark County Commissioner for District F since 2019 and served as a member of the Nevada Senate for the 9th district from 2012 to 2014. He is a member of the Democratic Party.

== Early life and education ==
Jones was born in Granada Hills, California, and grew up in California and Utah. Jones served a service mission for the Church of Jesus Christ of Latter-day Saints in Guatemala. He received his undergraduate degree in political science from Brigham Young University and his J.D. degree from The George Washington University Law School. After law school, Jones served as a law clerk to U.S. District Court Judge Roger L. Hunt before going into private practice as an attorney in Las Vegas. Jones is currently a partner with the law firm of Jones Lovelock.

== Political career ==
=== Nevada Legislature ===
Jones announced he would run for the Nevada Senate in 2012 after Republican Elizabeth Halseth resigned her seat. Jones defeated Fred Conquest in the Democratic primary in June 2012 by a margin of 82.5% to 17.5%. He defeated Mari Nakashima St. Martin in the general election on November 6, 2012, by 301 votes.

During the 2013 legislative session, Jones served as Assistant Majority Whip, Chair of the Senate Health and Human Services Committee, and on the Judiciary and Commerce and Labor Committees. In 2014, Jones also served as Chair of the Interim Legislative Committee on Health Care.

Jones was defeated by Republican Becky Harris in November 2014.

Jones previously ran unsuccessfully in 2004 for the Nevada Assembly against Republican Chad Christensen.

=== Clark County Commission ===
In May 2017, Jones announced his campaign as a Democratic candidate for the Clark County Commission seat being vacated in 2018 by Susan Brager, who was term-limited. Jones defeated Jason Hunt in the Democratic primary in June 2018 by a margin of 66% to 34%. He defeated Republican Tisha Black in the general election on November 6, 2018 by a margin of 54% to 46%.

Jones ran for reelection in 2022, defeating Republican Drew Johnson by 336 votes. In September 2025, Jones announced that he would not run for re-election to the Clark County Commission in 2026.

As a County Commissioner, Jones has also served on a number of regional boards, including as Chair of the Regional Transportation Commission of Southern Nevada, Chair of the Regional Flood Control District, Chair of the Springs Preserve Board of Trustees, Vice Chair of the Clark County Redevelopment Agency, Vice Chair of the Water Reclamation District, and on the Board of Directors of the Southern Nevada Water Authority, Southern Nevada Regional Planning Coalition, ImpactNV and Las Vegas Global Economic Alliance (2019-2023). Jones has also served as the local government representative on the Nevada Legislature Interim Legislative Subcommittee on Public Lands (2022, 2024).

== Electoral history ==
Democratic primary results, 2012
Party	Candidate	Votes	%
Democratic	Justin Jones	1,605	82.52%
Democratic	Fred Conquest	340	17.48%
Total votes		1,945	100%

Nevada Senate District 9 results, 2012
Party	Candidate	Votes	%
Democratic	Justin Jones	21,849	50.35%
Republican	Mari Nakashima St. Martin	21,548	49.65%
Total votes		43,397	100%

Nevada Senate District 9 results, 2014
Party	Candidate	Votes	%
Republican	Becky Harris	12,475	55.22%
Democratic	Justin Jones (incumbent)	10,116	44.78%
Total votes		22,591	100%

Democratic primary results, 2018
Party	Candidate	Votes	%
Democratic	Justin Jones	8,663	65.94%
Democratic	Jason Hunt	4,475	34.06%
Total votes		13,138	100.0%

Clark County Commission District F election results, 2018
Party	Candidate	Votes	%
Democratic	Justin Jones	55,825	54.04%
Republican	Tisha Black	47,483	45.96%
Total votes		103,308	100%

Clark County Commission District F election results, 2022
Party	Candidate	Votes	%
Democratic	Justin Jones	53,759	50.16%
Republican	Drew Johnson	53,423	49.84%
Total votes		103,308	100%

== Controversies ==
=== Representation of Las Vegas Sands Corp. ===
In October 2010 the Las Vegas Sands Corp. was brought into a lawsuit alleging that the company wrongfully terminated Sands China CEO Steven Jacobs. During a June 2012 court proceeding, information became available that Las Vegas Sands Corp. had access to a computer hard drive containing over 100,000 emails that provided evidence of Jacobs unlawful termination. Las Vegas Sands Corp insisted that this hard drive was located in Macau, and was therefore unable to be used as evidence due to the Personal Data Protection Act laws of the country. In September 2012, Justin Jones testified in court that he and other lawyers of Las Vegas Sands Corp. had in fact reviewed the emails while located in Las Vegas at the time. When asked by a prosecuting attorney what actions he took in court when the defendant Las Vegas Sands Corp. insisted the files were inaccessible, Jones responded, "I did nothing."

Jones was not named in the District Court Judge's reprimand of Las Vegas Sands Corp.

=== Clark County Commission lawsuit 2019 ===
Jones has been accused by mining company Gypsum Resources LLC of misleading the state ethics commission, engaging with the County and its leaders in "governmental misconduct", as well as influencing political support for Nevada Governor Steve Sisolak in exchange for "political favors." Both Jones and Sisolak rejected these claims with Sisolak pointing to prior statements to demonstrate that his position on the matter was unchanged. The original proposal, which was announced in 2003, detailed a plan to develop 5,500 residential homes on a piece of property named Blue Diamond Hill overlooking the Red Rock Canyon National Conservation Area. In response to this plan, the Clark County Commission created a zoning ordinance for the area, limiting the amount of development allowed. Gypsum Resources LLC owner Jim Rhodes sued the commission and a Federal court ruled in the developer's favor. In 2011, Gypsum Resources was approved to develop 7,000 residential homes on Blue Diamond Hill – 1,500 more than previously proposed, contingent upon the acquisition of a federal roads permit. This ignited opposition from the nonprofit activist group Save Red Rock, and after outspoken public forums, and the developer's failure to obtain a federal roads permit, the Commission voted to deny Gypsum Resources' request for a waiver to continue without one. In July 2019, after multiple failed attempts to develop Blue Diamond Hill, Gypsum Resources LLC filed for bankruptcy. In May of that year, Gypsum Resources opened a lawsuit against Clark County and The Clark County Board of Commissioners, alleging that elected officials "violated the right to due process" and "failed to act in good faith when reviewing paperwork related to the project," resulting in financial damages exceeding $1 billion. Additionally, the lawsuit challenged Jones' ability to vote on Gypsum Resources related proposals. Gypsum also accused Jones of destroying evidence by deleting text messages from his phone related to the company's development.

On April 21, 2023 Jones was sanctioned by Federal Magistrate Judge Elayna J. Youchah for deleting text message evidence relating to the lawsuit in bad faith. Judge Youchah, in part, wrote Jones, "was less than candid about the deletion when testifying at deposition and in declarations, as well as when presenting argument to this court is clear. Whether the act of deleting the evidence was in bad faith or for an improper motive is not a close call." Judge Youchah went on to say, "Mr. Jones deleted all texts knowing the role he played in achieving the vote to deny Gypsum the waiver it sought and he did not want his dedicated involvement in this outcome, or his communications with the Sisolak campaign, Commissioner (Steve) Sisolak or anyone else with whom he communicated about the deal he struck, to come to light." Jones attempted to appeal the sanction which was denied.

Following the Federal sanctioning of Jones community outrage ensued and boiled over at a Clark County Commission meeting on May 2, 2023. Numerous speakers shared their discontent about Jones with one describing him as a "cancerous sore" while many others called on him to resign.

The Nevada State Bar opened an investigation into the conduct of Jones on May 11, 2023.

On May 17, 2023 Jones officially resigned his position as Vice Chair of the Clark County Commission, while continuing to retain his seat on the commission. Jones said, "By stepping down as Vice Chair, I am hopeful that the ongoing and contested legal disputes in the Gypsum Resources litigation will not distract further from the important work of Clark County and the Board."

On April 17, 2024, following an evidentiary hearing, Jones was sanctioned for deleting text messages by Eighth Judicial District Court Judge Joanna Kishner.

The Las Vegas Review Journal called on Jones to resign and labeled him as "covered in disgrace" on May 4, 2024.

On June 18, 2024 Clark County approved an $80 million settlement in favor of Gypsum Resources LCC. Clark County Commission Chairman Jim Gibson said, "We have done some things that we’re not proud of as a county. Those things are things that we will live with."

The Las Vegas Review Journal described the $80 million settlement with Gypsum Resources LLC as "Justin Jones’ jackassery" and that a monument should be constructed "in front of the Government Center featuring Mr. Jones shoveling taxpayer money into a blast furnace." in an editorial published July 13, 2024.

The Nevada State Bar's two complaints against Jones stated he "engaged in conduct involving dishonesty, fraud, deceit, misrepresentation, or that is prejudicial to the administration of justice by intentionally destroying evidence and then lying by omission about the destruction" and also said Jones "engaged in criminal conduct" which were published in a Las Vegas Review Journal article on November 26, 2024.

Jones will be allowed to present evidence of his "mental state" when he deleted text messages at his disciplinary hearing where he faces disbarment in March 2025.

== Personal life ==
Jones is married to Megan K. Jones, with whom he has two children.

Political offices
Preceded by Susan Brager	Member of the Clark County Commission from District F 2019–present	Incumbent
Preceded by James B. Gibson	Vice Chair of the Clark County Commission; 2022–present	Incumbent
