= Elizabeth Helgelien =

American politician (born 1983)

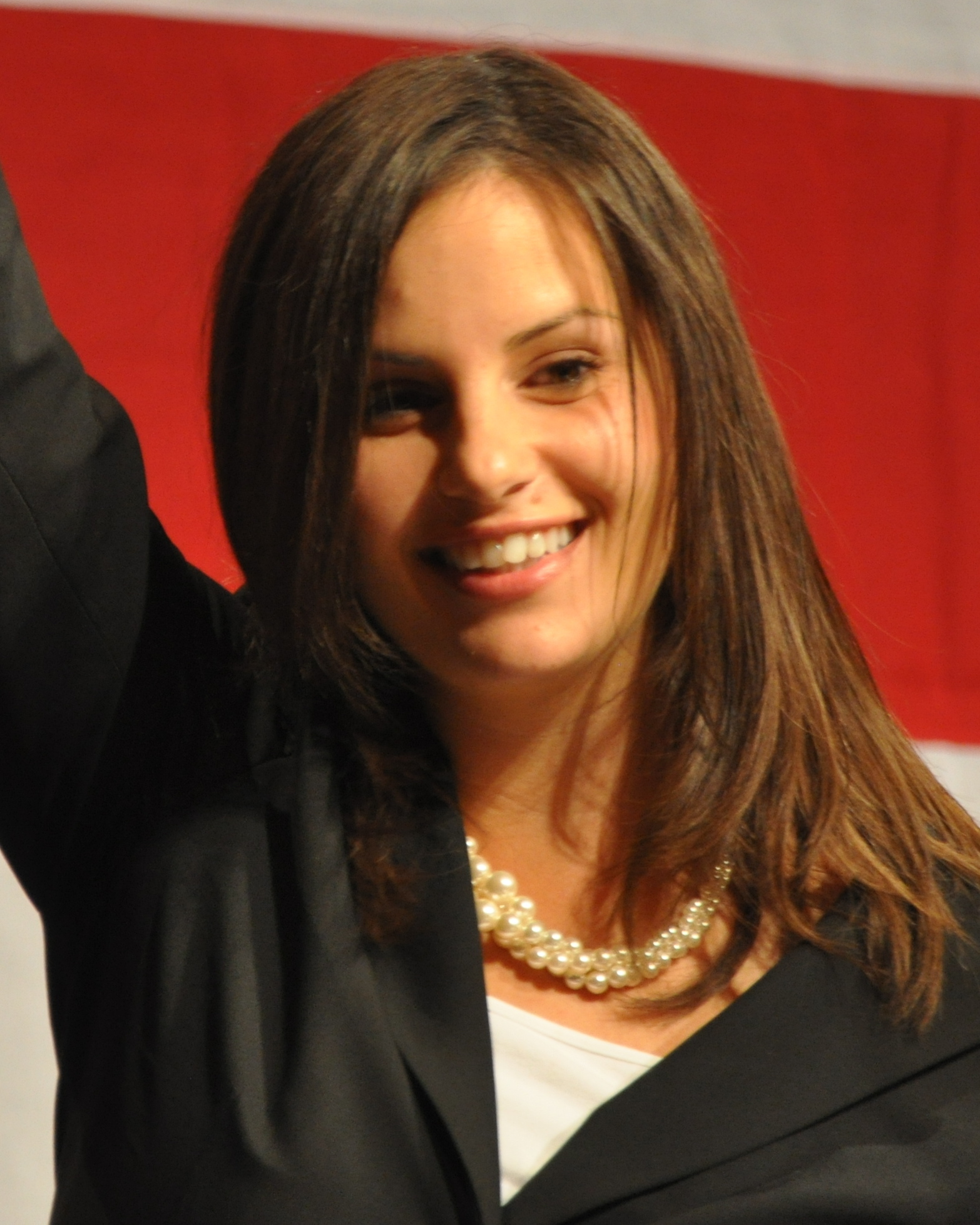
- Helgelien in 2010

Member of the Nevada Senate from the 9th district
- In office November 2, 2010 – February 17, 2012
- Preceded by: Dennis Nolan
- Succeeded by: Justin Jones

Personal details
- Born: Elizabeth Nicole Schworak; February 5, 1983 (age 43) Oregon, U.S.
- Party: Republican
- Spouse(s): Daniel Halseth (2001–2011); Tiger Helgelien
- Children: 3
- Education: Corban University

Elizabeth Nicole Helgelien (née Schworak; formerly Halseth, born February 5, 1983) is an American politician. She was a Republican member of the Nevada Senate from November 2010 until February 2012. Halseth is the youngest woman ever elected to the Nevada Legislature. She unsuccessfully ran for a seat in the Nevada Senate in 2018. She was a candidate in the Republican primary for Nevada's 3rd congressional district in 2024.

== Early life and education ==
Elizabeth Nicole Schworak was born in Oregon in 1983, where she and her four siblings were raised by her single mother Candy. She graduated from North Salem High School in Salem, Oregon in 2001.

In 2006, after her husband lost his job and her income working for a tow truck company was insufficient, the couple was forced to file for personal bankruptcy and thereafter moved to Nevada. She attended Corban University but did not earn a degree.

== Career ==
=== Nevada Senate ===
==== 2010 election ====
She began her political career running as Elizabeth Halseth in 2010, running for Assembly District 13 in the Nevada Assembly before leaving the race before the filing deadline to the Nevada Senate's 9th district.

During the primary campaign, Halseth released a telephone recording of her opponent, long-term Republican Dennis Nolan, pressuring the ex-wife of his friend, Gordon Lawes, who had been sentenced to a ten-years in prison for raping her 16-year old sister, to "tell the truth" about the rape and that it would be "very financially beneficial" if she did.

Nolan admitted to the call but insisted that he "made up" the statement that she would be paid if she told the truth. After defeating Nolan in the primary, she then went on to defeat millionaire jeweler Benny Yerushalmi who was heavily supported by the Democratic establishment in the general election.

==== Tenure and resignation ====
While a Senator, she was a member of the Senate Revenue Committee, Senate Commerce, Labor and Energy Committee, and the Senate Transportation Committee. She announced her resignation from office on February 17, 2012, citing issues with balancing performance of her senatorial duties with being a single mother. She also wrote in her letter of resignation that she would likely seek employment outside of Nevada due to issues with finding employment.

Her resignation followed criticism that she was missing meetings and not returning telephone calls. Her then-husband Daniel Halseth was later indicted on two felony counts: one of coercion and one of battery; he was also indicted on one misdemeanor count of open and gross lewdness.

=== Post-Senate career and 2018 election ===
She moved to Alaska where she worked as a realtor, before ultimately returning to Nevada. In 2018, she announced that she would run for a vacant seat as Elizabeth Helgelien in the Nevada Senate's 8th district after the incumbent, Independent Patricia Farley, announced she would retire; she was defeated in the Republican primary by Valerie Weber. The Democratic candidate, Marilyn Dondero Loop, would go on to win the seat.

=== 2024 congressional campaign ===
In March 2023, Helgelien announced that she would run for Congress to represent Nevada's 3rd congressional district, challenging Democratic incumbent Susie Lee. She was endorsed by Republican Congressman Matt Gaetz (R-FL). Helgelien placed third in the seven person Republican primary.

== Personal life ==
In 2001, she married Daniel Halseth; they divorced in 2012.

In May 2012 after her February resignation from the Senate, she appeared in Maxim's "Hot 100" photo contest appearing in a bikini although she did not win the "Hot 100" contest but was later profiled by Maxim in October 2012 with an additional photoshoot which has her in a magenta bikini.

In April 2021, her then 16-year-old daughter, Sierra, and Sierra's boyfriend, Aaron Guerrero, were arrested in Salt Lake City for the murder of Helgelien's ex-husband Daniel Halseth in Las Vegas; Halseth was stabbed, dismembered, and then burned in order to cover up the killing. On October 20, 2022, both were sentenced to 22 years to life in prison with the possibility of parole after pleading guilty to all counts on May 25, 2022. In a response to requests for comment, Helgelien stated: "This is the only time I will address this during the campaign. I will always love my daughter. It horrifies me that our system didn't take the abuse she was receiving seriously before it came to this. My daughter was abused by her father,” she alleged. “That doesn't excuse her actions. At the time, she was a minor and has taken responsibility like an adult. She is now facing the consequences like an adult."

Helgelien is Christian.
