= Rebecca Edgeworth =

American politician from Nevada

Member of the Nevada Assembly from the 35th district
- Incumbent
- Assumed office November 6, 2024
- Preceded by: Michelle Gorelow

Personal details
- Born: 1968 (age 57–58) Nellis Air Force Base, Nevada, U.S.
- Party: Republican
- Spouse: Bruce Geller
- Education: University of South Florida (BS, MD)
- Website: www.edgeworthfornevada.com

Rebecca Lynn Edgeworth is an American physician and politician serving as a member of the Nevada Assembly from the 35th district since 2024. A member of the Republican Party, she was elected in the 2024 Nevada Assembly election.

== Early life and career ==
Edgeworth was born on Nellis Air Force Base near Las Vegas, Nevada, in 1968 and moved frequently as a child. She graduated from the University of South Florida with a Bachelor of Science in biology in 2000 and a Doctor of Medicine in 2004. She completed her residency in internal medicine at the University Medical Center of Southern Nevada.

Since 2013, Edgeworth has worked as an adjunct professor at Touro University Nevada. She served as medical director for the Volunteers in Medicine in Southern Nevada.

== Nevada Assembly ==
Edgworth ran for the Nevada Assembly in 2024, running in the 35th district where incumbent Democrat Michelle Gorelow was retiring.

In October, campaign finance reports showed Edgeworth had raised $162,000 while Democratic nominee Sharifa Wahab had raised $27,000; she was supported by Governor Joe Lombardo, the Clark County Education Association, the Nevada Mining Association, and several law enforcement groups. She defeated Wahab in the general election, flipping the seat and breaking Democrats' supermajority.

=== Tenure ===
She supports school choice, expanding Medicare to hospice services, and did not support funding universal free school meals for K-12 students.

== Electoral history ==
Nevada State Assembly 35th district general election, 2024
Party	Candidate	Votes	%
Republican	Rebecca Edgeworth	21,140	54.32%
Democratic	Sharifa Wahab	17,774	45.68%
Total votes		38,914	100%
Republican gain from Democratic			

== Personal life ==
Edgeworth is Jewish.
