= Heidi Kasama =

American politician

Member of the Nevada Assembly from the 2nd district
- Incumbent
- Assumed office November 4, 2020
- Preceded by: John Hambrick

Personal details
- Born: 1959 (age 66–67) New York City, New York, U.S.
- Party: Republican
- Spouse: Peter Kasama
- Children: 5
- Education: University of Washington; Central Washington University (BS)

Heidi Wathne Kasama is an American politician, serving in the Nevada State Assembly for District 2. A member of the Republican Party, Kasama was born in New York and now resides in Las Vegas.

In August 2023 Kasama announced her candidacy for Nevada's 3rd congressional district in the 2024 United States House of Representatives elections, but later opted to run for re-election instead. She is running in the 2026 Clark County Commission elections for the District F seat as the Republican nominee, where she faces independent former Republican state senator and former Chair of the Nevada Gaming Control Board Becky Harris and Democratic nominee Minja Yan.
