= James Healey (Nevada politician) =

American politician

Member of the Nevada Assembly from the 35th district
- In office 2012–2014
- Preceded by: Pete Goicoechea
- Succeeded by: Brent A. Jones

Personal details
- Party: Democratic

James Healey is an American politician, who was elected to the Nevada Assembly in the 2012 elections. A member of the Democratic Party, he represented the 35th Assembly District, which is based in the southwestern portion of the Las Vegas Valley, also known as Enterprise. Healey was defeated for reelection in 2014 by Republican businessman Brent Jones by a margin of 53-47%.

Healey is openly gay.
