= Nevada's 9th Senate district =

American legislative district

Coordinates: 36.03°N 115.28°W

Nevada's 9th State Senate district
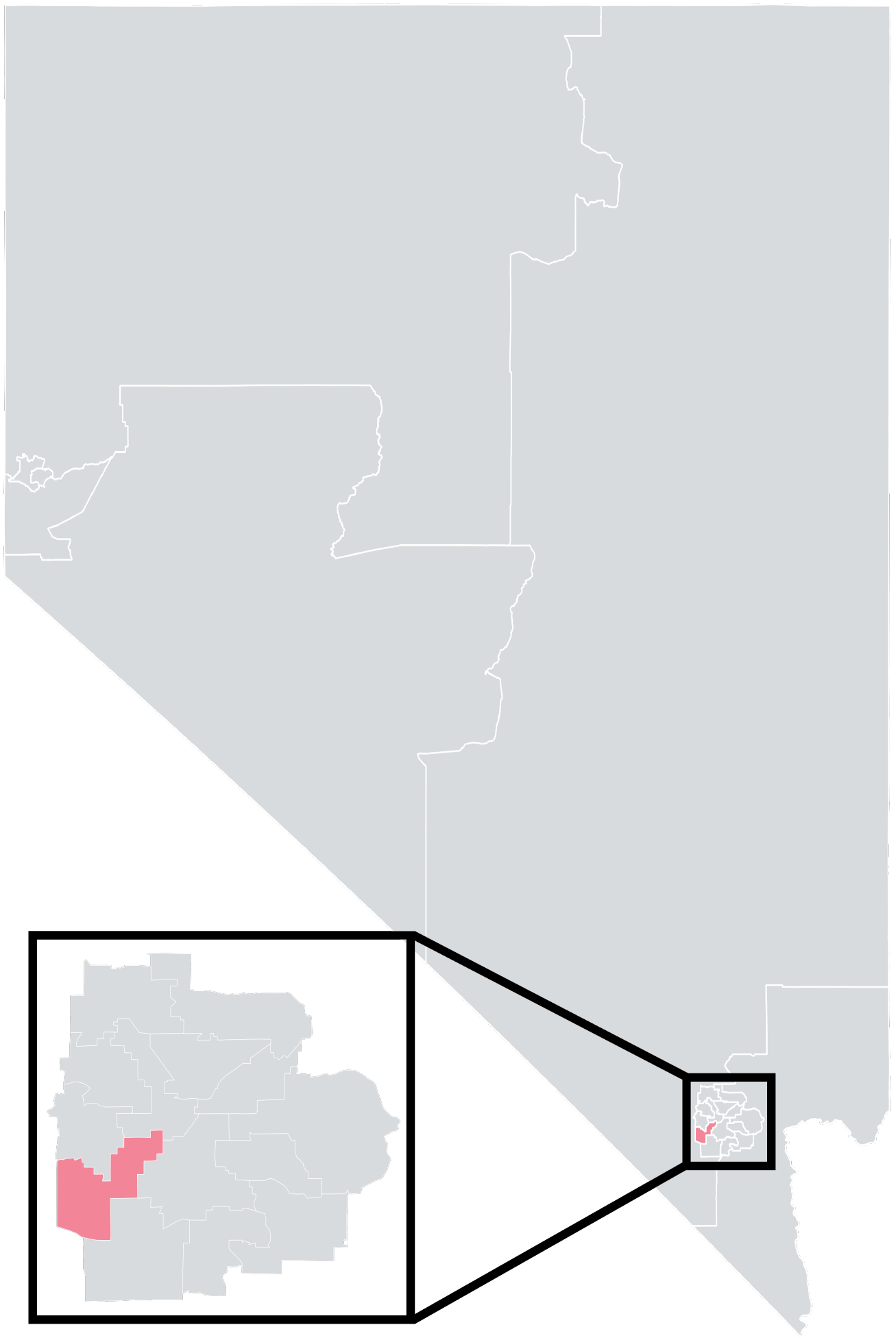
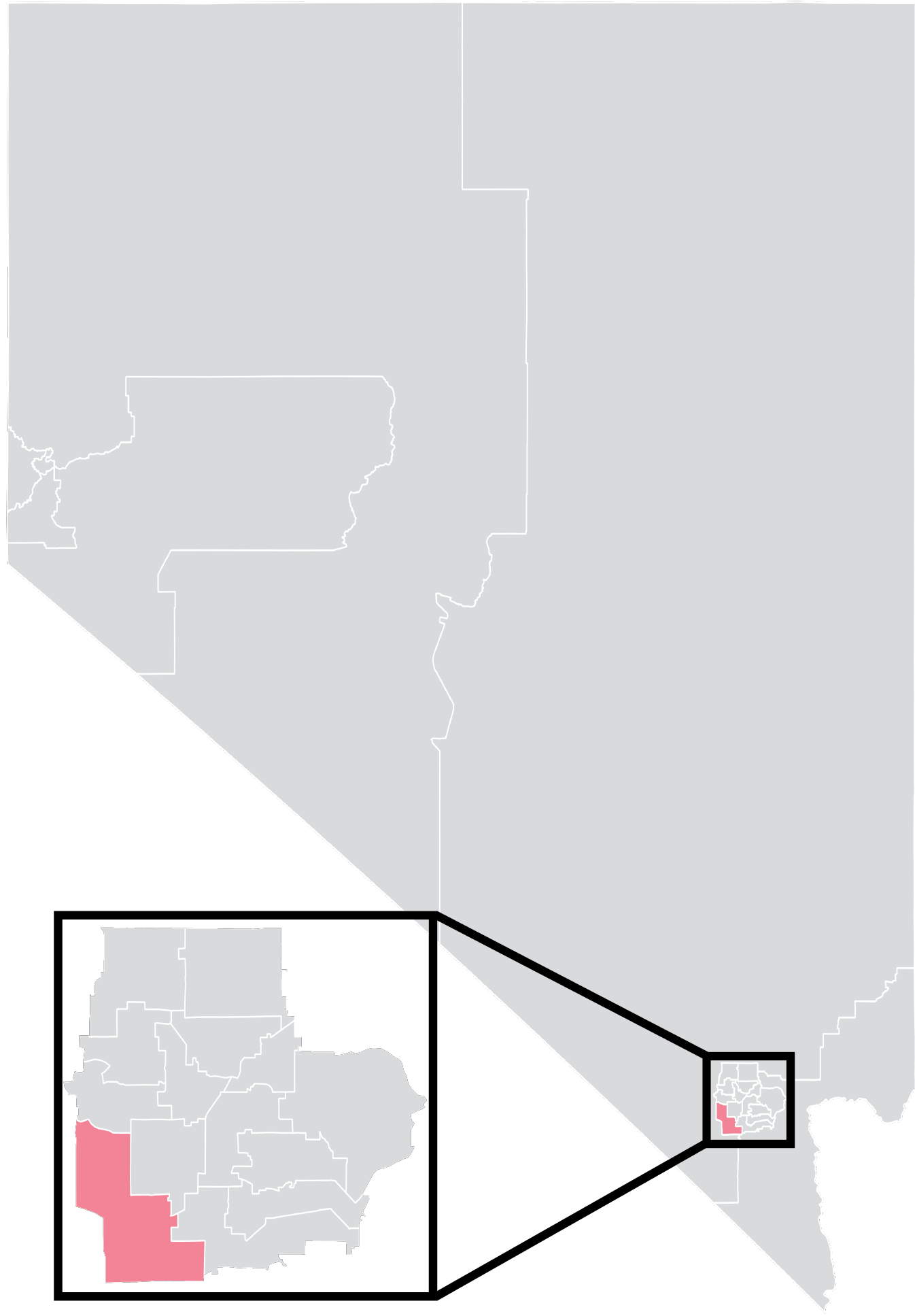
Senator
Melanie Scheible; D–Las Vegas
- Registration: 41.3% Democratic; 34.1% Republican; 18.7% No party preference
- Demographics: 44% White; 8% Black; 19% Hispanic; 22% Asian; 1% Hawaiian/Pacific Islander; 6% Other
- Population (2018): 171,895
- Registered voters: 57,104

Nevada's 9th Senate district is one of 21 districts in the Nevada Senate. It has been represented by Democrat Melanie Scheible since 2018, succeeding Republican Becky Harris.

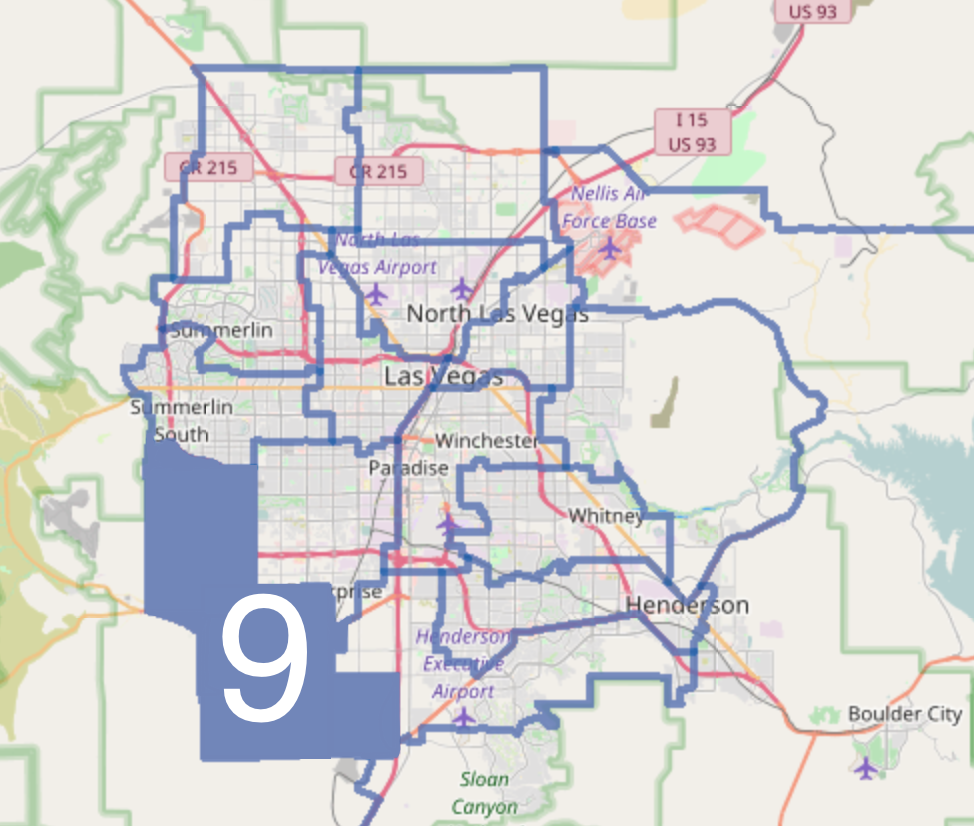
Closeup on the Las Vegas Valley with District 9 colored blue

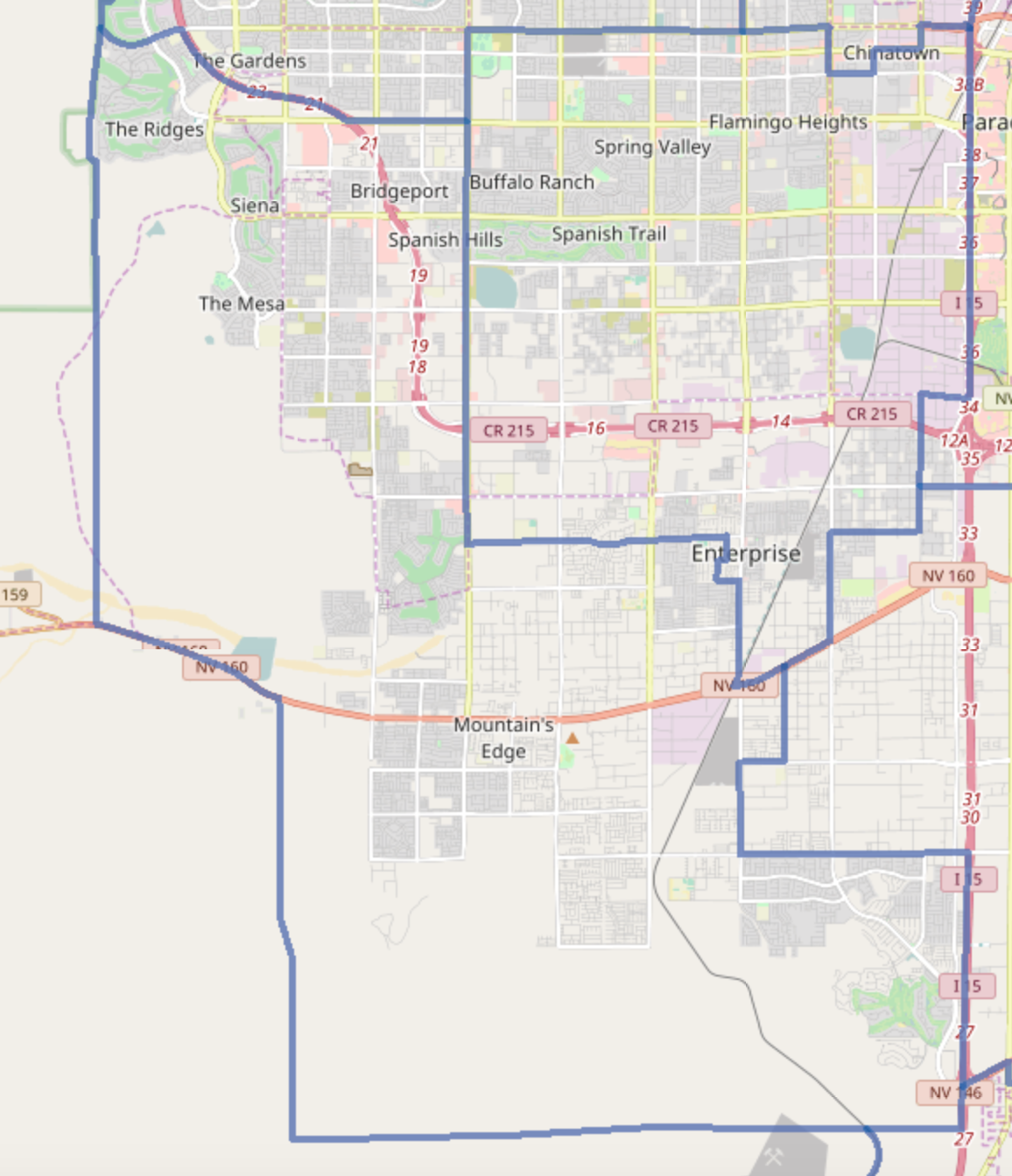
Closeup map of District 9 (on the left)

== Geography and demographics ==
District 9 is based in the southwestern suburbs of Las Vegas in Clark County, including most of Enterprise and parts of Summerlin South and Spring Valley.

The district is located entirely within Nevada's 3rd congressional district, and overlaps with the 9th and 35th districts of the Nevada Assembly. It has a total surface area of 63 square miles (160 km^{2}), and a perimeter of 43.7 miles (70.3 km).

According to the 2010 Census, the 9th district had a total population of 128,882 – 0.22% above the ideal. That population has since grown significantly, to over 170,000. Compared to other Senate districts, the district has a relatively low white and Latino population, and a much larger Asian American population. The district also has a relatively large percentage of young adults, and a small percentage of seniors. In 2015, almost 38% of its inhabitants were between the ages of 17 and 40, and nearly 13% were 60 or older. Furthermore, the 9th district's population is better educated than state average; over 30% of its inhabitants have a bachelor's or a graduate's degree, while only 8% has no high school diploma. The median household income in the district is $72,000, $20,000 higher than the Nevada median, while the poverty rate is half of that of the state's.

== Recent election results ==
Nevada Senators are elected to staggered four-year terms; since 2012 redistricting, the 9th district has held elections in midterm years, with the exception of an off-cycle election in 2012.

=== 2022 ===
2022 Nevada State Senate election, District 9
Party	Candidate	Votes	%
Democratic	Melanie Scheible (incumbent)	22,823	53.5
Republican	Tina Brown	19,875	46.5
Total votes		42,698	100
Democratic hold			

== Historical election results ==
=== 2018 ===
2018 Nevada State Senate election, District 9
Primary election
Party	Candidate	Votes	%
Democratic	Melanie Scheible	4,424	69.4
Democratic	Larry McCullough	901	14.1
Democratic	Brandon West	601	9.4
Democratic	Justin Rebollo	450	7.1
Total votes		6,376	100
General election
Democratic	Melanie Scheible	30,900	55.6
Republican	Tiffany Jones	24,660	44.4
Total votes		55,560	100
Democratic gain from Republican			

=== 2014 ===
In 2014, incumbent Democrat Justin Jones ran for re-election, drawing four Republican opponents: Becky Harris, Vick Gill, David Schoen, and Ron Quilang. Harris, who was endorsed by the Senate Republican Caucus, had previously waged an unsuccessful campaign for State Assembly. Gill, a political newcomer, focused on his opposition to the Affordable Care Act. Schoen highlighted the lack of young voices in politics, while Quilang contended that politicians didn't represent small businesses and that Nevada was "moving backward." Harris won the primary with just over half of the vote; Gill was behind with 40%, while both Schoen and Quilang received around 5%.

During the general election campaign, Harris presented herself as a moderate. The Las Vegas Review-Journal went further by calling her "[a] Republican running on Democrat issues." Jones' campaign was supported by the Culinary Workers Union and the AFL–CIO, both of which provided volunteers for his campaign. In September, in a television ad which the Review-Journal called misleading, Jones was attacked for previous incident representing Las Vegas Sands as an attorney. Two polls were conducted: a late September poll from Republican pollster The Tarrance Group which showed Harris up 45-42%, and an early October poll from Democratic pollster Momentum Analysis showing Jones leading Harris 46-44%.

According to the Las Vegas Review-Journal, District 9 was one out of three districts that "[would] decide which party [would control] the Senate." Harris ultimately defeated Jones with 55% of the vote, resulting in a Republican Senate majority.

2014 Nevada State Senate election, District 9
Party	Candidate	Votes	%
Republican	Becky Harris	1,830	50.3
Republican	Vick Gill	1,452	39.9
Republican	David Schoen	206	5.7
Republican	Ron Quilang	153	4.2
Total votes		3,641	100
General election
Republican	Becky Harris	12,475	55.2
Democratic	Justin Jones (incumbent)	10,116	44.8
Total votes		22,591	100
Republican gain from Democratic			

=== 2012 ===
In 2010, Republican Elizabeth Halseth was elected to the 9th district under different borders. However, on February 17, 2012, she resigned after her husband was arrested and the couple divorced, triggering an off-cycle election on November 6, 2012 to fill the remainder her term.

Both Democrats and Republicans held primaries for the seat. On the Democratic side, lawyer and 2004 Assembly candidate Justin Jones was challenged by College of Southern Nevada professor and 2010 gubernatorial candidate Frederick Conquest. With the endorsement of the Senate Democratic Caucus, Justin Jones won the primary with over 80% of the vote. For Republicans, Nevada GOP spokeswoman Mari Nakashima St. Martin faced Assemblyman Brent Jones, who supported the Tea Party movement. St. Martin won the endorsement of the Republican Senate Caucus and defeated Brent Jones 54-46%.

In the general election, Justin Jones campaigned on jobs and education, promoting smaller class sizes and arguing that an improved education system would attract new businesses to the state. St. Martin similarly highlighted education, saying that the government should not cut school funding, and advocated for fewer business regulations. Jones' previous representation of Las Vegas Sands in a civil lawsuit proved to be another campaign focus. As part of the suit, Jones was a member of a group of attorneys which was later fined $25,000 after a judge determined they had an "intention to deceive." Jones, who was not personally convicted, defended himself, but St. Martin nevertheless campaigned on the issue. Although St. Martin out-raised Jones $350,000-$280,000, Jones won the election by around 300 votes.

2012 Nevada State Senate election, District 9
Party	Candidate	Votes	%
Republican	Mari Nakashima St. Martin	1,641	54.2
Republican	Brent Jones	1,386	45.8
Total votes		3,027	100
Democratic	Justin Jones	1,605	82.5
Democratic	Frederick Conquest	340	17.5
Total votes		1,945	100
General election
Democratic	Justin Jones	21,849	50.3
Republican	Mari Nakashima St. Martin	21,548	49.7
Total votes		43,397	100
Democratic gain from Republican			

=== Federal and statewide results ===
Year	Office	Results
2020	President	Biden 53.0 – 45.2%
2018	Senate	Rosen 55.4 – 41.0%
2018	Governor	Sisolak 54.9 – 40.8%
2016	President	Clinton 51.5 – 42.8%
2012	President	Obama 54.0 – 44.4%
2012	Senate	Berkley 46.1 – 44.7%

== History ==
Originally, the 9th district was created after the 2000 census. It first stretched from Northwest Las Vegas into Enterprise and Southwest rural Clark County. The modern District 9 was drawn during a reapportionment after the 2010 Census. The new districts became effective on January 1, 2012 for filing for office, and for nominating and electing senators, and for all other purposes on November 7 – the day after Election Day, when the new senator terms began. The area that the ninth senatorial district occupies is defined in the Nevada Revised Statutes using census tracts, block groups, and blocks.
