= Justin Watkins =

Former member of the Nevada Assembly

Member of the Nevada Assembly from the 35th district
- In office November 9, 2016 – November 2018
- Preceded by: Brent A. Jones
- Succeeded by: Michelle Gorelow

Personal details
- Born: Justin Lee Watkins; May 27, 1979 (age 47) Las Vegas, Nevada
- Party: Democratic
- Spouse: Marni
- Children: 2
- Education: Oregon State University; University of San Diego School of Law

Justin Lee Watkins (born May 27, 1979) is a former Democratic member of the Nevada Assembly. He represented the 35th district, which covers parts of the southwestern Las Vegas Valley.

== Biography ==
Watkins was born in Las Vegas in 1979, and graduated from Oregon State University in 2001. He received his Juris Doctor from the University of San Diego School of Law in 2004. Watkins practices law with Battle Born Injury Lawyers, a firm that includes fellow Assemblyman Steve Yeager. He is licensed to practice law in California, Nevada, and Utah.

Watkins ran for the Assembly in 2016. He was unopposed in the Democratic primary and defeated incumbent Republican Brent A. Jones.

In October 2017, Watkins announced he would not seek reelection in 2018.

== Personal life ==
Watkins and his wife, Marni, have 2 daughters; Adyson and Sydney.

== Political positions ==
Watkins identifies as a moderate Democrat. He supports expanding background checks for gun purchases.

== Electoral history ==
Nevada Assembly District 35 election, 2016
Party	Candidate	Votes	%
Democratic	Justin Watkins	16,700	54.4%
Republican	Brent A. Jones	13,996	45.6%
Total votes		30,696	100.0%
