= Brent A. Jones =

American politician

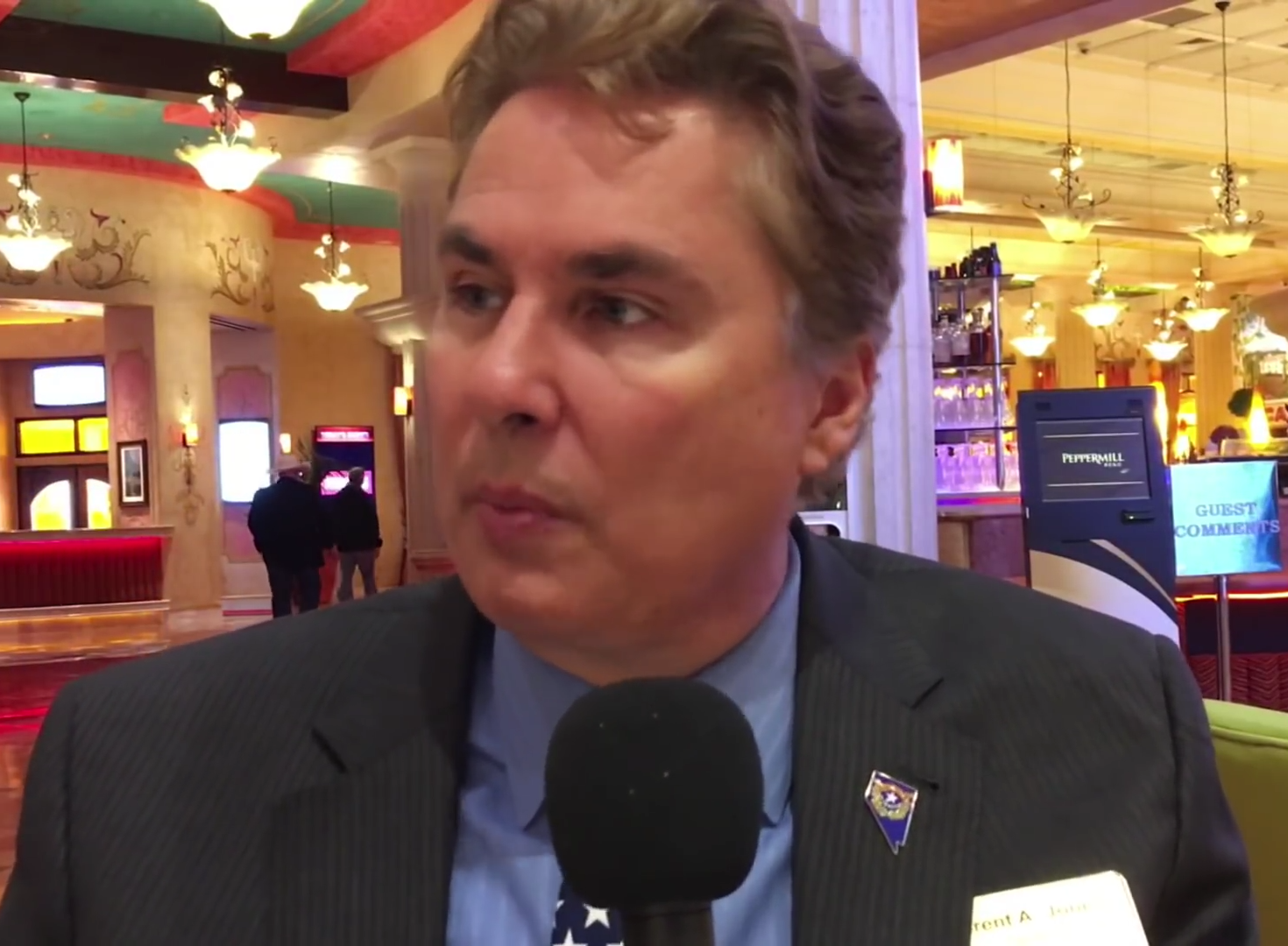

Member of the Nevada Assembly from the 35th district
- In office November 5, 2014 – November 9, 2016
- Preceded by: James Healey
- Succeeded by: Justin Watkins

Personal details
- Born: Brent Allan Jones; July 14, 1963 (age 63) Ojai, California, U.S.
- Party: Republican
- Spouse: Aimee Jones
- Children: 3
- Education: University of California, Riverside (did not graduate); Embry–Riddle Aeronautical University (did not graduate); California State University, Northridge; Pepperdine University School of Law
- Occupation: Lawyer, businessman, politician

Brent Allan Jones (born July 14, 1963) is an American lawyer, business owner and politician. He served one term as a Republican member of the Nevada Assembly.

== Early life ==
Brent A. Jones was born in 1963 in Ojai, California. He played Little League Baseball as a child and Varsity Football in high school.

Jones attended the University of California, Riverside, and he transferred to Embry–Riddle Aeronautical University, where he was accepted into the Reserve Officers' Training Corps. He dropped out after he contracted Guillain–Barré syndrome, an autoimmune disease. Eventually, he graduated from California State University, Northridge, where he received a Bachelor of Science in business administration. He received a juris doctor from the Pepperdine University School of Law. He passed the California Bar exam.

== Career ==
Jones started his career as a lawyer. According to his campaign website, he "did the preliminary legal work and assisted in raising start-up capital for Light Point Systems," a private company which "provides solar technology for hand held electronics" out of Ventura, California.

Jones serves as the chief executive officer of Affinity Lifestyles, a private company which makes Real Water, a brand of bottled water in Nevada. The water comes from the Las Vegas Valley Water District; it is reverse osmosis water plus an alkalizing agent in a bottle. The company has 40-60 employees. The company's Real Water product, which advertises an alkaline pH, became central to lawsuits and an FDA probe related to several cases of hepatitis and liver failure. In response Jones posted a video on the company's website expressing his "deepest sympathy and concern", and the company recalled all products.

Jones served as a Republican member of the Nevada Assembly from 2014 until 2016, where he represented District 35, including Enterprise, Nevada. He is opposed to raising taxes.

Jones was defeated in his bid for reelection by Democrat Justin Watkins.

== Personal life ==
With his wife Aimee, they have three children. They reside in Las Vegas, Nevada.

Jones is a Scientologist.

== Controversy ==
In June 2024, jurors ordered Jones' water brand, Real Water, to pay Las Vegas residents more than $3billion (USD) after lawsuits in October 2023 and February 2024 found Real Water liable for liver failure and other long-term liver damage to 5 children and 3 adults, due to hydrazine being found in the bottled water. Complaints with the FDA date back as far as 2021, after the company was linked to non-viral hepatitis infections. It wasn't until 2021 that Jones requested the bottled water be pulled from the shelves. Two months after recalling the water, and only after the company had entered bankruptcy proceedings, did Jones issue an apology. At this point, Jones was still the President of Real Water, and there is no indication on whether he will be facing criminal charges, as of this publishing.
