= Melanie Scheible =

American politician from Nevada

Member of the Nevada Senate from the 9th district
- Incumbent
- Assumed office November 7, 2018
- Preceded by: Becky Harris

Personal details
- Born: May 27, 1989 (age 37) Sacramento, California, U.S.
- Party: Democratic
- Education: Stanford University (BA); Columbia University (JD)

Melanie Scheible (Note: Pronounced /ˈʃaɪbəl/ SHY-bəl.) is an American politician and attorney serving as a member of the Nevada Senate.

== Early life and education ==
Scheible was born in Sacramento, California and raised in Reno, Nevada. She earned a Bachelor of Arts in public policy from Stanford University and a Juris Doctor from Columbia Law School. While in law school, Scheible interned at the Brooklyn District Attorney's Office.

== Career ==
Scheible remains a deputy district attorney in Clark County while out of session. Since her election in 2018, Scheible has represented the 9th district, which includes southwestern suburbs of Las Vegas in Clark County, including most of Enterprise and parts of Summerlin South and Spring Valley.

== Personal life ==
Scheible is bisexual. She is one of five openly-LGBT members of the Nevada Legislature, alongside senators David Parks, Pat Spearman, Dallas Harris, and Assemblywoman Sarah Peters.
