= Las Vegas Global Economic Alliance =

501(c)6 membership organization in Clark County, Nevada

The Las Vegas Global Economic Alliance (LVGEA) is a 501(c)6 membership organization led by President and CEO Danielle Casey established to promote economic diversification and growth in Clark County, Nevada, including the Cities of Las Vegas, North Las Vegas, Henderson, Boulder City, and Mesquite. The organization was formed as the Southern Nevada Industrial Foundation in 1956, later known as the Nevada Development Authority, and finally renamed the LVGEA in 2013. The organization has helped attract, retain and expand companies including Levi Strauss & Co., Bank of America, Zappos and SolarCity to the Las Vegas area. The organization stated an intent to raise $7.5 million over three years through its Engage Southern Nevada Investment campaign.

== Economic development ==
The LVGEA is the Southern Nevada regional economic development authority as defined in NRS 231.1571. The organization is also the author and owner of the Southern Nevada Comprehensive Economic Development Strategy (CEDS).

== Education ==
The LVGEA Education Council is led by LVGEA Chairman Emeritus Glenn Christenson and United Way of Southern Nevada Vice President of Community Development Terri Janison. The council has hosted events with local educators including Clark County School District Superintendent Pat Skorkowsky.

== Transportation ==
In 2013, the LVGEA supported Nevada Legislature Bill AB 413, which allows the Clark County Board of Commissioners to index fuel taxes to inflation. The LVGEA asserted if AB 413 passed, more than $800 million in road construction funding for Clark County could be raised and 11,000 new jobs were possible. The Bill was approved June 12, 2013.

In May 2016, the Las Vegas Global Economic Alliance’s board of directors unanimously approved a resolution supporting the extension of Fuel Revenue Indexing. The proposed 10-year extension of the current program will be on the ballot as an initiative this November in Clark County.

== Immigration reform ==
In July 2014, the LVGEA endorsed comprehensive immigration reform that “secures our borders, expands the temporary worker and employer-sponsored green cards programs, creates a balanced and workable employment verification system, and provides a legalization program with tight criteria and eventual citizenship.” U.S. Senator for Nevada Harry Reid supported the position stating, “I was glad to hear that the Las Vegas Global Economic Alliance recently endorsed immigration reform."

== Key Staff ==
=== Jonas R. Peterson ===
President and CEO

Certified by the International Economic Development Council, Peterson joined the LVGEA following his tenure as president and CEO of the Santa Clarita Valley Economic Development Corporation. Peterson leads all of LVGEA’s Economic Development efforts. He has studied at North Dakota State and Penn State. In May, 2015 Peterson was named President and CEO of the organization.

=== Jared Smith ===
Chief Operating Officer

Jared Smith is the chief operating officer of the Las Vegas Global Economic Alliance (LVGEA). In this position, Smith has a leadership role in the organization’s economic development, planning, operations, partnership building and strategy. Prior to joining the LVGEA, Smith was director of business development for the Baton Rouge Area Chamber (BRAC). He worked closely with the Mayor, Metropolitan Council, and other stakeholders to recruit and retain companies to East Baton Rouge Parish. Notable wins for the Baton Rouge area during his tenure include IBM’s 800-job technology center, Katoen Natie’s two-million-square-foot logistics facility, and many other small business expansions.

=== Terrence Thornton ===
Vice President of Investment Services and Development

Thornton oversees investor recruitment for Engage Southern Nevada campaign. A former Nevada Development Authority staffer, Thornton previously worked as a teacher for the Clark County School District. He earned a Nonprofit Management and Leadership M.A. from Walden University and is an alumnus of University of Las Vegas.

=== Anthony J. Ruiz ===
Senior Director of Communications and Public Affairs

Anthony James Ruiz is the Senior Director of Communications and Public Affairs for the Las Vegas Global Economic Alliance. In this role, he manages public affairs initiatives for the LVGEA and builds strategic partnerships that further the organization’s mission. Additionally, he is responsible for developing marketing and communication strategies in order to elevate the overall brand of the LVGEA, implementing and maintaining marketing campaigns as well as performing external communication functions with the goal of furthering business attraction and expansion efforts in Southern Nevada.
