= Flora Dungan =

American politician and community activist

- Born: 1917; Minnesota, United States
- Died: October 25,1973 (aged 55–56)
- Other name: Flora Turchinsky Dungan
- Education: Polytechnic High School (Los Angeles), Los Angeles Junior College, University of California at Berkeley
- Occupations: activist, politician
- Known for: member, Nevada Assembly (1962–68)
- Notable work: Dungan v. Sawyer lawsuit (1965) that reapportioned Nevada legislature based on population
- Spouse(s): Mr. Dungan (div. 1948), Robert M. Stang (m. 1957; div. 1959), Ed Oncken (m. 1965; div. 1965)

Flora Turchinsky Dungan (1917 – October 25, 1973) was an American activist and politician who resided in Las Vegas, Nevada.

She was born in Minnesota; her parents were immigrants from Russia. In 1933 she graduated from Polytechnic High School in Los Angeles, California. In 1936 she completed a program at Los Angeles Junior College and transferred to University of California at Berkeley, where she graduated with honors and a degree in Psychology in 1938. In 1939 she completed a one year course in Social Service, also at Berkeley.

She initially worked in child welfare services but during World War II she found work as an accountant. She continued in this profession through her and her husband's move to Las Vegas in 1948. That same year she and her husband divorced. She kept the name Dungan professionally until her death. In 1957 she married Robert M. Stang. In 1959 they divorced. In 1965 she married and divorced Ed Oncken, an editor for the Las Vegas Sun. By 1969 she had married Ray Ben David.

Dungan became involved in several community, professional, and civil society organizations in Las Vegas, including the local chapter of the League of Women Voters, the Nevada Society of Public Accountants, and the Clark County Democratic party, where she served on the county and state Democratic Central Committees.

== Political career ==
In 1962, Dungan was elected to the Nevada Assembly from Clark County, representing Las Vegas. In August 1964, Dungan, having raised issue that Clarke County, the most populous county in the state, had less representation in the state legislature than more rural, less populated areas, sued Governor Grant Sawyer, along with Dr. Clare Woodbury. The following Nevada legislative session of 1965 had an opportunity to rectify the situation, but was unable to come to a conclusion. Dungan v. Sawyer was heard in Federal District Court in 1965. It based its argument on the 1962 U.S. Supreme Court ruling in the case Baker V. Carr the mandate of one-man, one-vote as well as the 1964 case Reynolds v. Sims which ruled that state legislatures had to be apportioned according to the state's population. The District court ruled for reapportionment of the state legislative districts which was done during the following special legislative session of the Nevada legislature, resulting in Clark County gaining seven seats in the state senate and four in the state assembly.

Dungan was reelected to her position in 1967, and led another significant lawsuit against the state of Nevada. This case argued for an expansion of the University of Nevada Board of Regents on the basis of a similar lack of fair representation. The case resulted in an expansion of representation that gave Clark County a five seat majority on the Regent's Board.

Dungan's time in the assembly was marked by service as the first woman on the Legislative Judiciary Committee where she fought for prison reform, and she was chairwoman of the Assembly Institutions Committee she investigated complaints of inmate abuse at Nevada State Prisons. She also worked to expand juvenile assistance programs and to lessen the penalties for possession of marijuana.

Dungan ran for state senate in 1968 but was defeated. She and her husband Ray Ben David founded Focus, a program for helping juveniles in the justice system in Nevada.

In 1972 Dungan was elected to the University Board of Regents where she served until her death on October 25, 1973, of cancer. She died in Los Angeles, California.

The Flora Dungan Humanities Building at University of Nevada, Las Vegas is named in her honor.
