= Nevada Senate =

Upper house of the Nevada Legislature

Coordinates: 39.162278°N 119.766136°W

Nevada State Senate
- Nevada Legislature

- Flag of the Nevada Legislature

Type
- Type: Upper house
- Term limits: 3 terms (12 years)

History
- New session started: February 3, 2025

Leadership
- President: Stavros Anthony (R) since January 2, 2023
- President pro tempore: Marilyn Dondero Loop (D) since February 3, 2025
- Majority Leader: Nicole Cannizzaro (D) since March 5, 2019
- Minority Leader: Robin L. Titus (R) since January 17, 2024

Structure
- Seats: 21
- Political groups: Majority: Democratic (13); Minority: Republican (8)
- Length of term: 4 years
- Authority: Article 4, Constitution of Nevada
- Salary: $146.90/day (first 60 days) per diem (entire session)

Elections
- Last election: November 5, 2024 (10 seats)
- Next election: November 3, 2026 (11 seats)
- Redistricting: Legislative control

Meeting place
- State Senate Chamber; Legislative Building, Carson City

Website
- Home

The Nevada Senate is the upper house of the Nevada Legislature, the state legislature of U.S. state of Nevada, the lower house being the Nevada Assembly. It currently consists of 21 members from single-member districts. In the previous redistricting (2002–2011) there were 19 districts, two of which were multimember. Since 2012, there have been 21 districts, each formed by combining two neighboring state assembly districts. Each state senator represented approximately 128,598 as of the 2010 United States census. Article Four of the Constitution of Nevada sets that state senators serve staggered four-year terms.

In addition, the size of the Senate is set to be no less than one-third and no greater than one-half of the size of the Assembly. Term limits, limiting senators to three 4-year terms (12 years), took effect in 2010. Because of the change in Constitution, seven senators were termed out in 2010, four were termed out in 2012, and one was termed out in 2014. The Senate met at the Nevada State Capitol in Carson City until 1971, when a separate Legislative Building was constructed south of the Capitol. The Legislative Building was expanded in 1997 to its current appearance to accommodate the growing Legislature.

== History ==
=== Boom and Bust era (1861–1918) ===
The first session of the Nevada Territorial Legislature was held in 1861. The Council was the precursor to the current Senate and the opposite chamber was called a House of Representatives which was later changed to be called the Assembly. There were nine members of the original Council in 1861 elected from districts as counties were not yet established. Counties were established in the First Session of the Territorial Legislature and the size of the Council was increased to thirteen. From the first session of the Nevada Legislature once statehood was granted the size of the Senate ranged from eighteen members, in 1864, to a low of fifteen members from 1891 through 1899, and a high of twenty-five members from 1875 through 1879.

=== Little Federalism era (1919–1966) ===
In 1919 the Senate started a practice called "Little Federalism," where each county received one member of the Nevada Senate regardless of population of said county. This set the Senate membership at seventeen which lasted until 1965–1967. The Supreme Court of the United States issued the opinion in Baker v. Carr in 1962 which found that the redistricting of state legislative districts are not political questions, and thus are justiciable by the federal courts. In 1964, the U.S. Supreme Court heard Reynolds v. Sims and struck down state senate inequality, basing their decision on the principle of "one person, one vote." With those two cases being decided on a national level, Nevada Assemblywoman Flora Dungan and Las Vegas resident Clare W. Woodbury, M.D. filed suit in 1965 with the United States District Court for the District of Nevada arguing that Nevada's Senate districts violated the equal protection clause of the Fourteenth Amendment of the Constitution of the United States and lacked of fair representation and proportional districts. At the time, less than 8 percent of the population of the State of Nevada controlled more than 50 percent of the Senate seats. The District Court found that both the Senate and the Assembly apportionment laws were "invidiously discriminatory, being based upon no constitutionally valid policy." It was ordered that Governor Grant Sawyer call a Special Session to submit a constitutionally valid reapportionment plan. The 11th Special Session lasted from October 25, 1965 through November 13, 1965 and a plan was adopted to increase the size of the Senate from 17 to 20.

=== Modern era (1967–present) ===
The first election after the judicial intervention and newly adopted apportionment law was 1966 and its subsequent legislature consisted of 40 members from the Assembly and 20 members from the Senate. Nine incumbent senators from 1965 were not present in the legislature in 1967. In the 1981 Legislative Session the size of the Senate was increased to twenty-one because of the population growth in Clark County. Following the 2008 election, Democrats took control of the Nevada Senate for the first time since 1991. In January 2011, Senator William Raggio resigned after 38 years of service. On January 18, 2011, the Washoe County Commission selected former member of the Nevada Assembly and former United States Attorney Gregory Brower to fill the vacancy and remainder of the term of Senator William Raggio. After the 76th Session and the decennial redistricting the boundary changes and demographic profiles of the districts prompted a resignation of Senator Sheila Leslie, in February 2012, and she announced her intention to run against Sen. Greg Brower in 2012. Later in February 2012, citing personal reasons, Senator Elizabeth Halseth resigned her suburban/rural Clark County seat.

== Legislative sessions ==
Legislative Session	Party (Shading indicates majority caucus)		Total
Legislative Session	Democratic	Republican	Total
54th Legislative Session, 1967	11	9	20
55th Legislative Session, 1969	11	9	20
56th Legislative Session, 1971	13	7	20
57th Legislative Session, 1973	14	6	20
58th Legislative Session, 1975	17	3	20
59th Legislative Session, 1977	17	3	20
60th Legislative Session, 1979	15	5	20
61st Legislative Session, 1981	15	5	20
62nd Legislative Session, 1983	17	4	21
63rd Legislative Session, 1985	13	8	21
64th Legislative Session, 1987	9	12	21
65th Legislative Session, 1989	8	13	21
66th Legislative Session, 1991	11	10	21
67th Legislative Session, 1993	10	11	21
68th Legislative Session, 1995	8	13	21
69th Legislative Session, 1997	9	12	21
70th Legislative Session, 1999	9	12	21
71st Legislative Session, 2001	9	12	21
72nd Legislative Session, 2003	8	13	21
73rd Legislative Session, 2005	10	11	21
74th Legislative Session, 2007	10	11	21
75th Legislative Session, 2009	12	9	21
76th Legislative Session, 2011	11	10	21
77th Legislative Session, 2013	11	10	21
78th Legislative Session, 2015	10	11	21
79th Legislative Session, 2017	11^{†}	8	21
80th Legislative Session, 2019	13	8	21
81st Legislative Session, 2021	12	9	21
82nd Legislative Session, 2023	13	8	21
83rd Legislative Session, 2025	13	8	21
Latest voting share	61.9%	38.1%	

=== Current session ===
Map of current partisan composition of legislative districts for the Nevada Senate Democratic representative Republican representative

↓
13	8
Democratic	Republican

Affiliation	Party (Shading indicates majority caucus)			Total	Vacant
Affiliation	Democratic	Independent	Republican	Total	Vacant
Begin 78th, February 2014	10	0	11	21	0
End 78th, November 2016	10	0	11	21	0
Begin 79th, February 2017	11	0	10	21	0
End 79th, November 2018	10	1	8	19	2
November 7, 2018	13	0	8	21	0
December 4, 2018		0	8	21	0
March 5, 2019	12	0	8	20	1
March 15, 2019	13	0	8	21	0
Begin 82nd, February 2023	13	0	8	21	0
October 26, 2023	13	0	7	20	1
Latest voting share	65%	35%			

== Composition and leadership of the 82nd Legislative session ==
=== Presiding over the Senate ===
The president of the Senate is the body's highest officer, although they only vote in the case of a tie, and only on procedural matters. Per Article 5, Section 17 of the Nevada Constitution, the lieutenant governor of Nevada serves as Senate president. In their absence, the president pro tempore presides and has the power to make commission and committee appointments. The president pro tempore is elected to the position by the majority party. The other partisan Senate leadership positions, such as the leader of the Senate and minority leader, are elected by their respective party caucuses to head their parties in the chamber. The current president of the Senate is Nevada Lieutenant Governor Stavros Anthony of the Republican Party.

=== Non-member officers ===
On the first day of a regular session, the Senate elects the non-member, nonpartisan administrative officers including the secretary of the Senate and the Senate sergeant at arms. The secretary of the Senate serves as the parliamentarian and chief administrative officer of the Senate and the sergeant at arms is chief of decorum and order for the Senate floor, galleries, and committee rooms. Claire J. Clift was originally appointed by then Republican Senate majority leader William Raggio. The Democratic Party took the majority in 2008 and she was retained until 2010. In August 2010, then Senate majority leader Steven Horsford appointed David Byerman as the 41st secretary of the Senate. The day after the 2014 general election, David Byerman was removed from his position and the previous secretary, Claire J. Clift, was re-appointed. Retired chief of police Robert G. Milby was chosen as the Senate sergeant at arms for the 78th Legislative by the Republican majority leader. Both of the elected non-member officers serve at the pleasure of the Senate, thus they have a two-year term until the succeeding session. The Senate also approves by resolution the remainder of the nonpartisan Senate Session staff to work until the remainder of the 120 calendar day session.

=== 83rd session leadership ===
==== Leadership ====
Position	Name	Party	District
President/Lt. Governor	Stavros Anthony	Republican	N/A
President pro tempore	Marilyn Dondero Loop	Democratic	District 8

==== Majority leadership ====
Position	Name	Party	District
Majority Leader	Nicole Cannizzaro	Democratic	District 6
Assistant Majority Leader	Roberta Lange	Democratic	District 7
Chief Majority Whip	Melanie Scheible	Democratic	District 9
Deputy Majority Whip	Fabian Doñate	Democratic	District 10
Deputy Majority Whip	Skip Daly	Democratic	District 13

==== Minority leadership ====
Position	Name	Party	District
Minority Leader	Robin Titus	Republican	District 17
Assistant Minority Leader	Jeff Stone	Republican	District 20
Minority Whip	Lisa Krasner	Republican	District 16

==== Secretary of the Senate ====
Position	Name
Secretary of the Senate	Brendan Bucy
Assistant Secretary of the Senate	Sherry Rodriguez

=== Members of the 83rd Senate ===
Districts of the Nevada Assembly are nested inside the Senate districts, two per Senate district. The final Legislative redistricting plans as created by the Special Masters in 2011 and approved by District Court Judge James Todd Russell represent the first time since statehood Nevada's Assembly districts are wholly nested inside of a Senate district. Each Assembly district represents 1/42nd of Nevada's population and there are two Assembly districts per Senate district which represents 1/21st of Nevada's population.

District	Assembly Districts	Name	Party	Residence	Start	Next election
1	1, 17	Michelee Crawford	Democratic	Las Vegas	2024	2028
2	11, 28	Edgar Flores	Democratic	Las Vegas	2022	2026
3	3, 10	Rochelle Nguyen	Democratic	Las Vegas	2022 (Note: Originally appointed.)	2028
4	6, 7	Dina Neal	Democratic	Las Vegas	2020	2028
5	22, 29	Carrie Buck	Republican	Henderson	2020	2028
6	34, 37	Nicole Cannizzaro	Democratic	Las Vegas	2016	2028 (term limited)
7	18, 20	Roberta Lange	Democratic	Las Vegas	2020	2028
8	2, 5	Marilyn Dondero Loop	Democratic	Las Vegas	2018	2026
9	9, 42	Melanie Scheible	Democratic	Las Vegas	2018	2026
10	15, 16	Fabian Doñate	Democratic	Las Vegas	2021	2026
11	8, 35	Lori Rogich	Republican	Las Vegas	2024	2028
12	21, 41	Julie Pazina	Democratic	Las Vegas	2022	2026
13	24, 30	Skip Daly	Democratic	Sparks	2022	2026
14	31, 32	Ira Hansen	Republican	Sparks	2018	2026
15	25, 27	Angie Taylor	Democratic	Reno	2024	2028
16	26, 40	Lisa Krasner	Republican	Reno	2022	2026
17	38, 39	Robin Titus	Republican	Wellington	2022	2026
18	4, 13	John Steinbeck	Republican	Las Vegas	2024	2028
19	33, 36	John Ellison	Republican	Elko	2024	2028
20	19, 23	Jeff Stone	Republican	Las Vegas	2022	2026
21	12, 14	James Ohrenschall	Democratic	Las Vegas	2018	2026

=== Senate standing committees of the 83rd session ===
Committee	Chair	Vice Chair	Ranking Member	Number of members
Commerce and Labor	Julie Pazina	Skip Daly	John Ellison	8
Education	Angie Taylor	Marilyn Dondero Loop	Robin Titus	8
Finance	Marilyn Dondero Loop	Rochelle Nguyen	Robin Titus	8
Government Affairs	Edgar Flores	James Ohrenschall	Lisa Krasner	7
Growth and Infrastructure	Rochelle Nguyen	Julie Pazina	Ira Hansen	5
Health and Human Services	Fabian Doñate	Angie Taylor	Robin Titus	5
Judiciary	Melanie Scheible	Edgar Flores	Lisa Krasner	8
Legislative Operations and Elections	James Ohrenschall	Skip Daly	Lisa Krasner	5
Natural Resources	Michelee Crawford	Melanie Scheible	Ira Hansen	5
Revenue and Economic Development	Dina Neal	Fabian Doñate	Jeff Stone	5

Standing committees in the Senate have their jurisdiction set by the Senate Rules as adopted through Senate Resolution 1. To see an overview of the jurisdictions of standing committees in the Senate, see Standing Rules of the Senate, Section V, Rule 40.

== See also ==
- Nevada State Capitol
- Nevada Legislature
- Nevada Assembly
- List of Nevada state legislatures
