= 2018 Nevada Senate election =

- November 6, 2018

11 of the 21 seats in the Nevada State Senate 11 seats needed for a majority
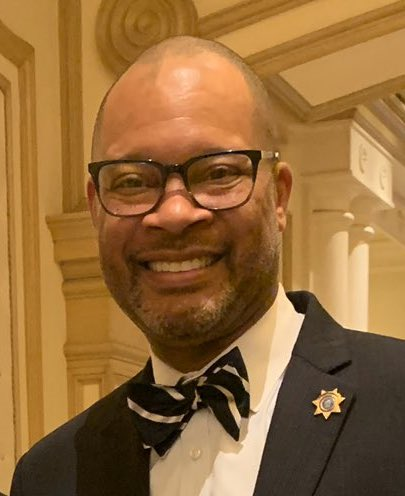

	Majority party	Minority party
Leader	Aaron Ford	Michael Roberson
Party	Democratic	Republican
Leader's seat	11th	20th
Last election	11	10
Seats before	11+1 (Note: On November 14, 2016, Patricia Farley of Senate District 8 switched parties from Republican to non-partisan and announced she would caucus with the Democrats.)	9
Seats won	13	8
Seat change	▲1	▼1
Popular vote	255,036	227,371
Percentage	51.30%	45.73%
Swing	▼0.02%	▼4.56%
- Results: Democratic gain Democratic hold Republican hold No election
Leader of the Senate before election
Aaron D. Ford
Democratic
Elected Leader of the Senate
Kelvin Atkinson
Democratic

The 2018 Nevada Senate election took place as part of the biennial United States elections. Nevada voters elected state senators in 11 of the state senate's 21 districts. State senators serve four-year terms in the Nevada State Senate.

A primary election on June 12, 2018, determined which candidates appeared on the November 6 general election ballot. Primary election results can be obtained from the State of Nevada's Secretary of State website.

Due to resignations and appointments, on election day 2018, there were 10 Democrats, one independent (caucusing with Democrats), eight Republicans, and two vacancies in the Nevada Senate. To claim control of the chamber from Democrats, the Republicans needed to net three Senate seats.

== Background ==
Following the 2016 state senate elections, Democrats flipped control of the Senate away from the Republicans with a slim majority of 11 Democrats to 10 Republicans. On November 14, 2016, Sen. Patricia Farley switched from Republican to non-partisan and began caucusing with the Democrats, increasing their majority to 12 seats. Democrat Ruben Kihuen of District 10 resigned to become a member of the U.S. House, and he was replaced by Democrat Yvanna Cancela on December 6, 2016. Democrat Mark Manendo of District 21 resigned amid allegations of sexual harassment on July 19, 2017, and Republican Becky Harris of District 9 resigned in January 2018 to chair the Nevada Gaming Control Board.

== Results ==
=== Summary of results by state senate district ===
- For districts not displayed, there would be no election until 2020.

State senate district	Incumbent	Party	Elected senator	Party
2nd	Mo Denis	Democratic	Mo Denis	Democratic
8th	Patricia Farley	Independent	Marilyn Dondero Loop	Democratic
9th	Vacant (Note: Republican Sen. Becky Harris resigned.)	Republican	Melanie Scheible	Democratic
10th	Yvanna Cancela	Democratic	Yvanna Cancela	Democratic
12th	Joe Hardy	Republican	Joe Hardy	Republican
13th	Julia Ratti	Democratic	Julia Ratti	Democratic
14th	Don Gustavson	Republican	Ira Hansen	Republican
16th	Ben Kieckhefer	Republican	Ben Kieckhefer	Republican
17th	James Settelmeyer	Republican	James Settelmeyer	Republican
20th	Michael Roberson	Republican	Keith Pickard	Republican
21st	Vacant (Note: Democratic Sen. Mark Manendo resigned.)	Democratic	James Ohrenschall	Democratic

=== Close races ===
Seats where the margin of victory was under 10%:

1. State Senate district 20, 0.04% (tipping point for supermajority)
2. State Senate district 8, 3.26%

== Predictions ==
Source	Ranking	As of
Governing	Likely D	October 8, 2018

== Detailed results by state senate district ==
- Results are only shown for races that were contested. In uncontested races (i.e., only one person ran); the Nevada Secretary of State's website does not provide results.

=== District 2 ===
- Both primaries were uncontested.

2nd Senate District general election, 2018
Party	Candidate	Votes	%
Democratic	Mo Denis (incumbent)	13,717	79.5
Republican	Cal Border	3,537	20.5
Total votes		17,254	100.0
Democratic hold			

=== District 8 ===
8th Senate District Democratic primary election, 2018
Party	Candidate	Votes	%
Democratic	Marilyn Dondero Loop	4,590	65.68
Democratic	Stephanie Alvarado	2,398	34.32
Total votes		6,988	100.0

8th Senate District Republican primary election, 2018
Party	Candidate	Votes	%
Republican	Valerie Weber	2,533	40.28
Republican	Dan Rodimer	2,391	38.02
Republican	Elizabeth Helgelien	1,365	21.70
Total votes		6,289	100.0

8th Senate District general election, 2018
Party	Candidate	Votes	%
Democratic	Marilyn Dondero Loop	25,777	51.63
Republican	Valerie Weber	24,154	48.37
Total votes		49,931	100.0
Democratic gain from Independent			

=== District 9 ===
- The Republican primary was uncontested.

9th Senate District Democratic primary election, 2018
Party	Candidate	Votes	%
Democratic	Melanie Scheible	4,424	69.39
Democratic	Larry McCullough	901	14.13
Democratic	Brandon West	601	9.43
Democratic	Justin Allen Rebollo	450	7.06
Total votes		6,376	100.0

9th Senate District general election, 2018
Party	Candidate	Votes	%
Democratic	Melanie Scheible	30,900	55.62
Republican	Tiffany Jones	24,660	44.38
Total votes		55,560	100.0
Democratic gain from Republican			

=== District 10 ===
- The general election was uncontested.

10th Senate District Democratic primary election, 2018
Party	Candidate	Votes	%
Democratic	Yvanna Cancela (incumbent)	2,854	60.40
Democratic	Bryce Henderson	1,871	39.60
Total votes		4,725	100.0

10th Senate District general election, 2018
Party	Candidate	Votes	%
Democratic	Yvanna Cancela (incumbent)	20,383	100.0
Total votes		20,383	100.0
Democratic hold			

=== District 12 ===
- Both primaries were uncontested.

12th Senate District general election, 2018
Party	Candidate	Votes	%
Republican	Joe Hardy (incumbent)	37,193	61.65
Democratic	Craig Jordahl	23,133	38.35
Total votes		60,326	100.0
Republican hold			

=== District 13 ===
- The Democratic primary was uncontested and Republicans did not contest this election.

13th Senate District general election, 2018
Party	Candidate	Votes	%
Democratic	Julia Ratti (incumbent)	27,079	70.35
Independent American	Charlene Young	11,415	29.65
Total votes		38,494	100.0
Democratic hold			

=== District 14 ===
- Both primaries were uncontested.

14th Senate District general election, 2018
Party	Candidate	Votes	%
Republican	Ira Hansen	32,913	60.53
Democratic	Wendy Boszak	21,460	39.47
Total votes		57,373	100.0
Republican hold			

=== District 16 ===
- The Democratic primary was uncontested.

16th Senate District Republican primary election, 2018
Party	Candidate	Votes	%
Republican	Ben Kieckhefer (incumbent)	7,319	56.23
Republican	Gary R. Schmidt	5,698	43.77
Total votes		13,017	100.0

16th Senate District general election, 2018
Party	Candidate	Votes	%
Republican	Ben Kieckhefer (incumbent)	36,317	55.69
Democratic	Tina Davis-Hersey	26,674	40.9
Independent American	John Wagner	2,219	3.4
Total votes		65,210	100.0
Republican hold			

=== District 17 ===
- Both primaries were uncontested.

17th Senate District general election, 2018
Party	Candidate	Votes	%
Republican	James Settelmeyer (incumbent)	41,774	71.83
Democratic	Curtis Cannon	16,384	28.17
Total votes		58,158	100.0
Republican hold			

=== District 20 ===
20th Senate District Democratic primary election, 2018
Party	Candidate	Votes	%
Democratic	Julie Pazina	5,014	72.82
Democratic	Paul Aizley	1,871	27.18
Total votes		6,885	100.0

20th Senate District Republican primary election, 2018
Party	Candidate	Votes	%
Republican	Keith Pickard	3,696	58.94
Republican	Byron Brooks	2,575	41.06
Total votes		6,271	100.0

20th Senate District general election, 2018
Party	Candidate	Votes	%
Republican	Keith Pickard	27,162	49.05
Democratic	Julie Pazina	27,138	49.01
Libertarian	Rick Bronstein	1,078	1.95
Total votes		55,378	100.0
Republican hold			

=== District 21 ===
- The Republican primary was uncontested.

21st Senate District Democratic primary election, 2018
Party	Candidate	Votes	%
Democratic	James Ohrenschall	3,355	58.67
Democratic	Christine Glazer	1,522	26.62
Democratic	Jay Craddock	841	14.71
Total votes		5,718	100.0

21st Senate District general election, 2018
Party	Candidate	Votes	%
Democratic	James Ohrenschall	22,391	62.0
Republican	Ron McGinnis	13,721	38.0
Total votes		36,112	100.0
Democratic hold			

== See also ==
- List of Nevada state legislatures
