= William Horne (American politician) =

American politician

Member of the Nevada Assembly from the 34th district
- In office February 4, 2003 – February 2, 2015
- Preceded by: John Marvel
- Succeeded by: Victoria Seaman

Personal details
- Born: February 25, 1962 (age 64) Wichita Falls, Texas, U.S.
- Party: Democratic
- Education: University of Nevada, Las Vegas (BA); William S. Boyd School of Law (JD)
- Website: williamhorne.com

William C. Horne (born February 25, 1962, in Wichita Falls, Texas) was an American politician and a Democratic member of the Nevada Assembly from February 4, 2003, to February 2, 2015, representing District 34. Horne is a member of the National Black Caucus of State Legislators.

== Education ==
Horne earned his BA in criminal justice from the University of Nevada, Las Vegas, where he was a member of Tau Kappa Epsilon fraternity, and his JD from its William S. Boyd School of Law.

== Elections ==
- 2012 Horne won the June 12, 2012 Democratic Primary with 1,491 votes (79.60%), and won the November 6, 2012 General election with 13,861 votes (57.26%) against Republican nominee Clark Harrington.
- 2002 With Republican Assemblyman John Marvel redistricted to District 32, Horne was unopposed for the District 34 September 3, 2002 Democratic Primary and won the November 5, 2002 General election with 4,883 votes (51.5%) against Republican nominee Geny Del Rosario.
- 2004 Horne was unopposed for both the September 7, 2004 Democratic Primary and the November 2, 2004 General election, winning with 11,632 votes.
- 2006 Horne was unopposed for both the August 15, 2006 Democratic Primary and the November 7, 2006 General election, winning with 7,672 votes.
- 2008 Horne was unopposed for the August 12, 2008 Democratic Primary and won the three-way November 4, 2008 General election with 8,733 votes (60.16%) against Republican nominee Richard Deeds and Libertarian candidate William Hols.
- 2010 Horne, Deeds, and Hols won their parties' nominations, setting up a three-way rematch; Horne won the three-way November 2, 2010 General election with 6,016 votes (58.11%) against Deeds and Hols.
