= Alexis Hansen =

American politician

Member of the Nevada Assembly from the 32nd district
- Incumbent
- Assumed office November 7, 2018
- Preceded by: Ira Hansen

Personal details
- Born: 1960 (age 65–66) Sacramento, California, U.S.
- Party: Republican
- Spouse: Ira Hansen
- Children: 8
- Education: University of Nevada, Reno

Alexis M. Hansen (née Lloyd; born 1960) is an American politician, currently serving as a member of the Nevada Assembly from the 32nd district.

== Early life and education ==
Hansen was born Alexis Lloyd on 1960 in Sacramento, California. In 1978, Hansen graduated from Sparks High School. Later, she graduated from University of Nevada, Reno.

== Career ==
Hansen has been the co-owner of Hansen & Sons Plumbing since 1986. She has been a member of the Blue Star Mothers of America and National Rifle Association of America since 2017. In 2018, Hansen was elected to the Nevada Assembly, where she has been representing the 32nd district since November 7, 2018. Hansen is a Republican.

== Personal life ==
Alexis is married to fellow politician, Ira D. Hansen. Together, they have eight children and eighteen grandchildren. Alexis resides in Sparks, Nevada. She is a member of the Church of Jesus Christ of Latter-day Saints.
