= Vonne Chowning =

American politician

Member of the Nevada Assembly from the 19th district
- In office November 9, 1988 – November 7, 1990
- Preceded by: Paul May
- Succeeded by: Pat Little

Member of the Nevada Assembly from the 28th district
- In office November 4, 1992 – November 3, 2004
- Preceded by: Joe Johnson
- Succeeded by: Mo Denis

Personal details
- Born: January 5, 1943 (age 83) Long Beach, California, U.S.
- Party: Democratic
- Education: University of Nevada, Reno (B.A.)
- Occupation: Realtor

Vonne Chowning (born in 1943 in Long Beach, California) is a former American politician. She served as a Democratic member of the Nevada Assembly from 1988 to 1990 and again from 1992 to 2004, representing Districts 19 and 28 (both covering the northeastern Las Vegas Valley).

== Background ==
Chowning received her bachelor's degree in education from University of Nevada, Reno and worked as a foreign language teacher. She is fluent in Spanish. Later she became a realtor, a profession which she still practices, as well as a member of the Greater Las Vegas Board of Realtors.

== Elections ==
- 1988 In the Democratic primary for Assembly District 19, Chowning defeated three other candidates (including her eventual successor in the seat, Pat Little) with 616 votes (43%). She then defeated Republican Connie Glass with 2,721 votes (76%).
- 1990 Chowning and Little both ran again, and this time Chowning lost the primary with 532 votes (43%) to Little's 703 votes (57%)).
- 1992 After redistricting, much of Assembly District 19 was now in District 28. Chowning ran in AD28 and won a close three-way primary against Harold Giron and Jose Solorio with 552 votes (35%). In the general election she won against Republican Michael Palmieri with 2,781 votes (72%).
- 1994 Chowning was unopposed in the primary. In the general election she defeated Independent American Party candidate Dicksie Duke, winning 1,581 votes (78%).
- 1996 Chowning was unopposed in the primary. In the general election she defeated Duke and Libertarian candidate Jim Burns, winning 1,536 votes (76%).
- 1998 Only two candidates filed for District 28, both Democrats. As a result, there was no primary and the two competed in the general election. Chowning defeated Judi Lynn with 900 votes (60%).
- 2000 Chowning won the primary with 267 votes (58%) against Judi Lynn. She then defeated Libertarian James Dan with 1,197 votes (55%) in the general election.
- 2002 After the 2000 Census, Assembly District 28 was redrawn to exclude Chowning's house. However, she moved back into the district in order to run for re-election. She won the primary with 601 votes (53%) against Mo Denis, her eventual successor in the seat. She then won a rematch with Dan with 2,216 votes (65%) in the general election.
