= Edgar Flores (politician) =

American politician and attorney

Member of the Nevada Senate from the 2nd district
- Incumbent
- Assumed office November 9, 2022
- Preceded by: Mo Denis

Member of the Nevada Assembly from the 28th district
- In office November 5, 2014 – November 9, 2022
- Preceded by: Lucy Flores
- Succeeded by: Reuben D'Silva

Personal details
- Born: 1986 (age 39–40) Las Vegas, Nevada, U.S.
- Party: Democratic
- Education: University of Nevada, Las Vegas (BA, JD)

Edgar R. Flores (born 1986) is an American politician and attorney who serves as a member of the Nevada Senate, representing the 2nd district. He previously served in the Nevada Assembly, representing the 28th district, which covers parts of the eastern Las Vegas Valley.

== Early life and education ==
Flores was born to immigrants from Ciudad Juárez, Mexico, who were given legal status under the Immigration Reform and Control Act of 1986. He was the second of three children. He graduated from the University of Nevada, Las Vegas in 2008 and from the William S. Boyd School of Law in 2012.

== Career ==
After graduating from law school, Flores became an immigration attorney. Flores ran for the Assembly in 2014 to succeed Lucy Flores (no relation). As the only declared candidate, he won the election unopposed. In 2016, Flores faced a challenge from Republican Wesley Cornwell. He defeated Cornwell in the general election.

== Political positions ==
During the 2017 legislative session, Flores sponsored a successful bill that would mandate businesses accept green cards as a form of identification. Furthermore, he has been instrumental in Payday Lending Reform. He has focused heavily on spearheading consumer protection issues. In 2015 and 2017 he spearheaded important legislation against predatory businesses that pretend to be lawyers. In 2015, he passes legislation to help law enforcement curb the Nevada squatter crisis.

In 2021, Flores was the only Democratic Assemblyman to side with all Republicans in voting against a redistricting map derided by certain Hispanic groups.

== Electoral history ==
Nevada Assembly District 28 election, 2014
Party	Candidate	Votes	%
Democratic	Edgar Flores	3,388	100.0%
Total votes		3,388	100.0%

Nevada Assembly District 28 election, 2016
Party	Candidate	Votes	%
Democratic	Edgar Flores	9,200	78.2%
Republican	Wesley Cornwell	2,561	21.8%
Total votes		11,761	100.0%
