= Nevada's 8th Senate district =

American legislative district

Coordinates: 36.15°N 115.30°W

Nevada's 8th State Senate district
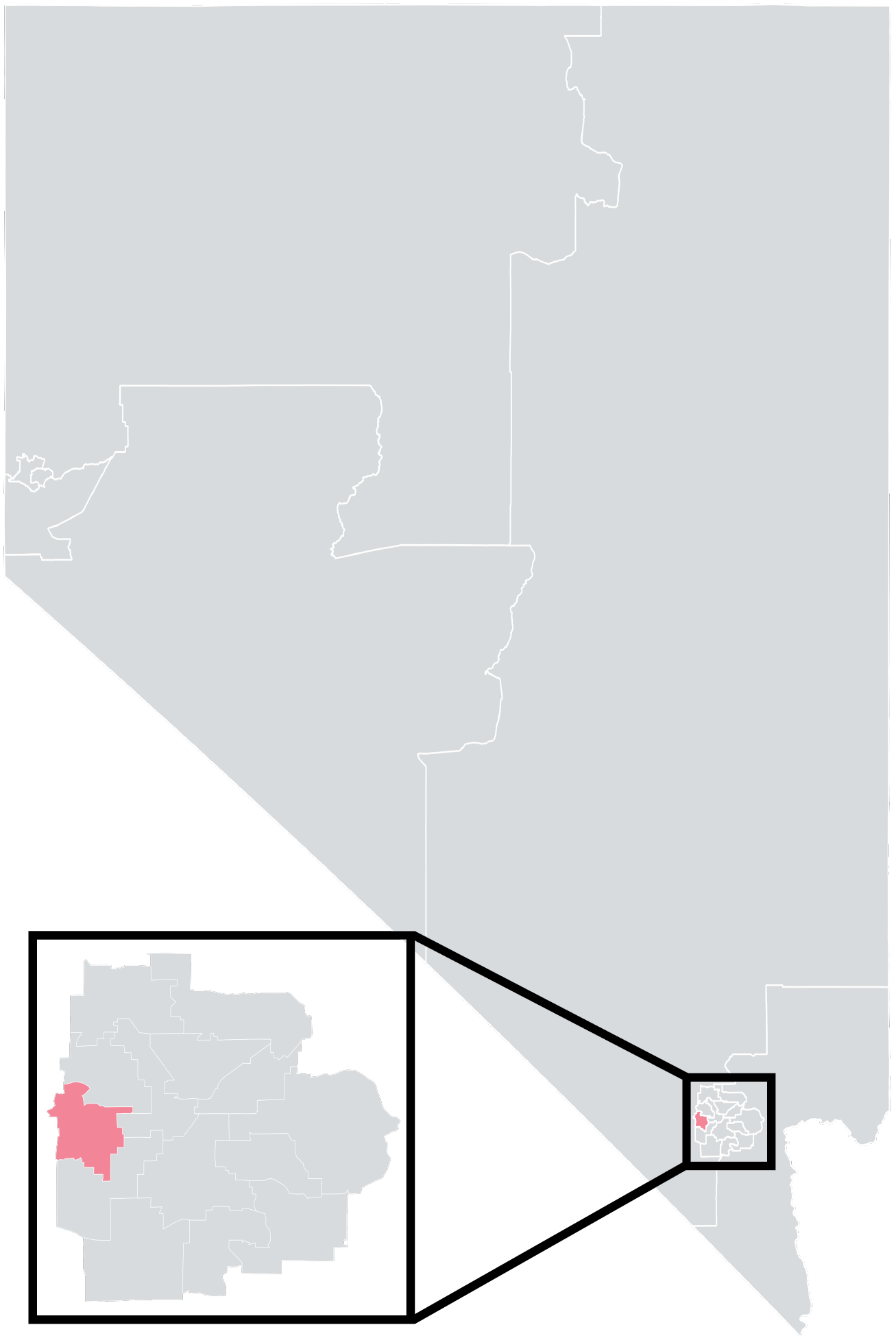
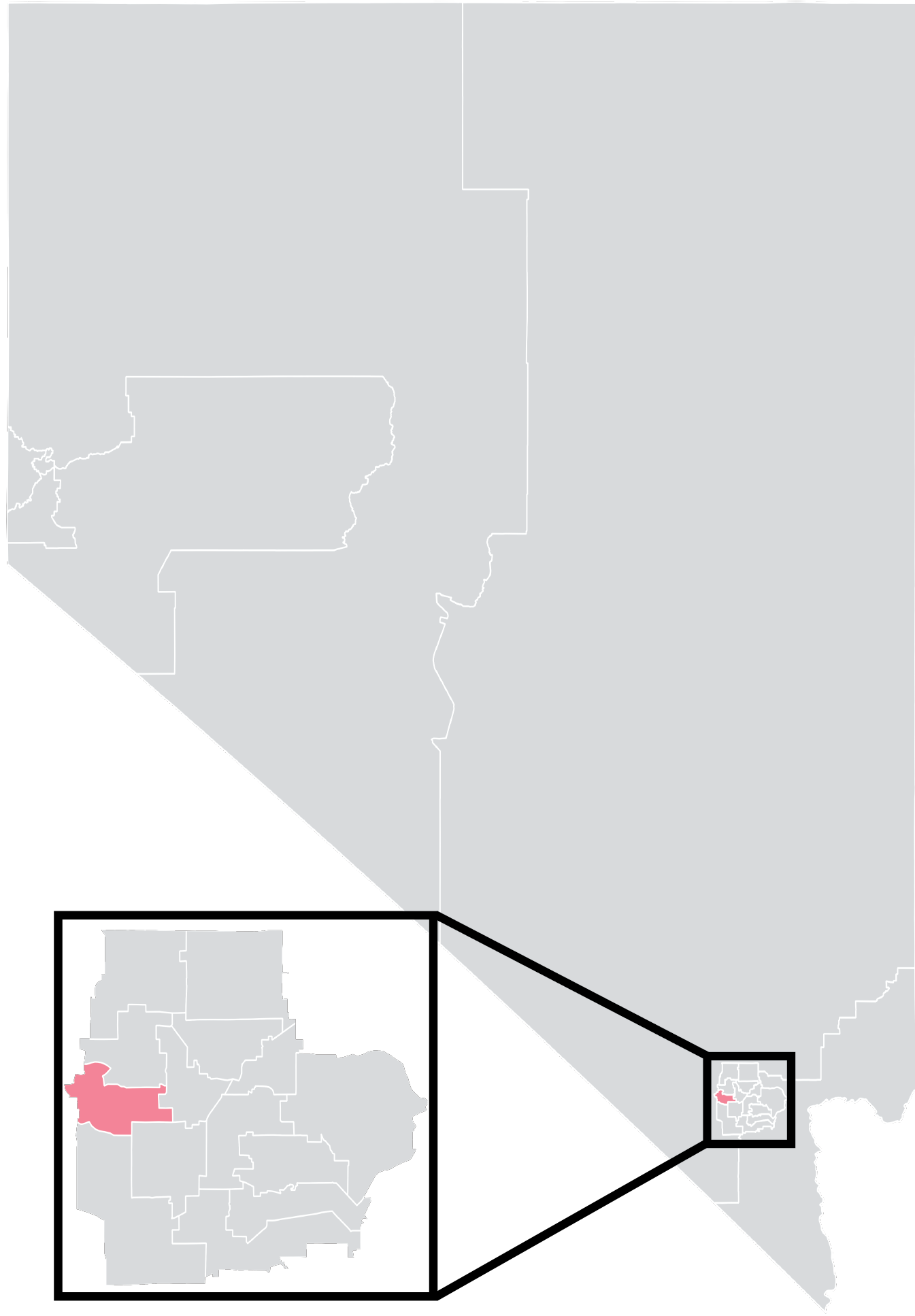
Senator
Marilyn Dondero Loop; D–Las Vegas
- Registration: 39.6% Democratic; 38.3% Republican; 16.9% No party preference
- Demographics: 58% White; 7% Black; 17% Hispanic; 13% Asian; 1% Hawaiian/Pacific Islander; 5% Other
- Population (2018): 134,632
- Registered voters: 72,500

Nevada's 8th Senate district is one of 21 districts in the Nevada Senate. It has been represented by Democrat Marilyn Dondero Loop since 2018, succeeding Republican-turned-independent Patricia Farley.

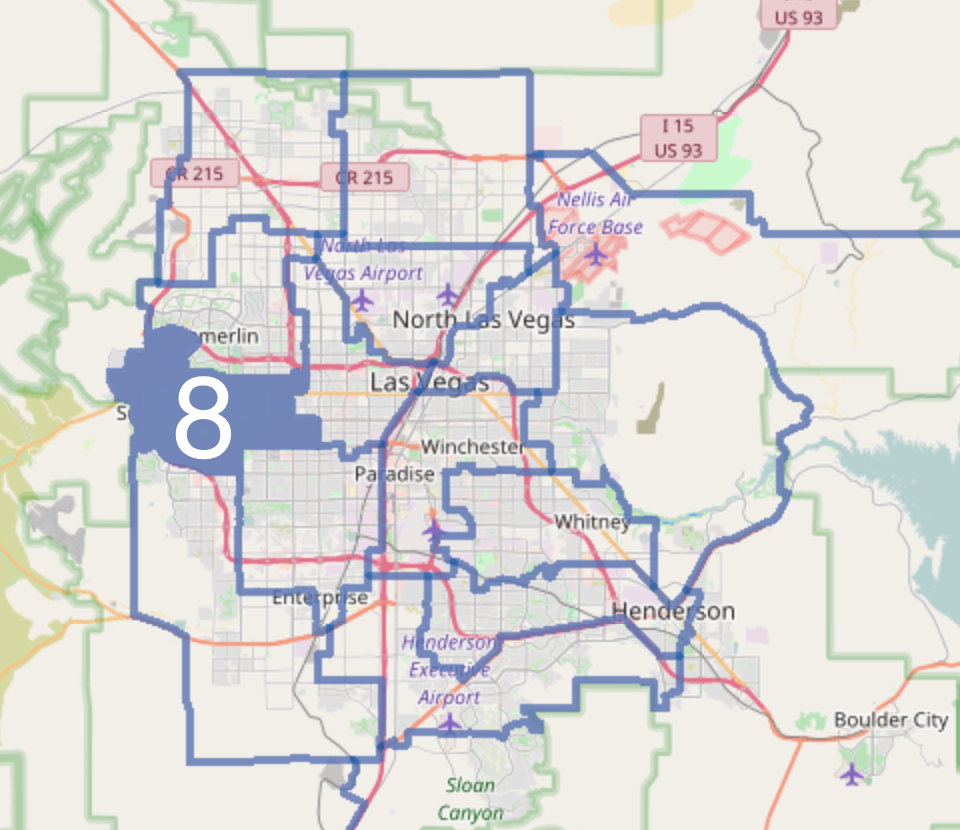
Closeup of the Las Vegas Valley with District 8 colored blue

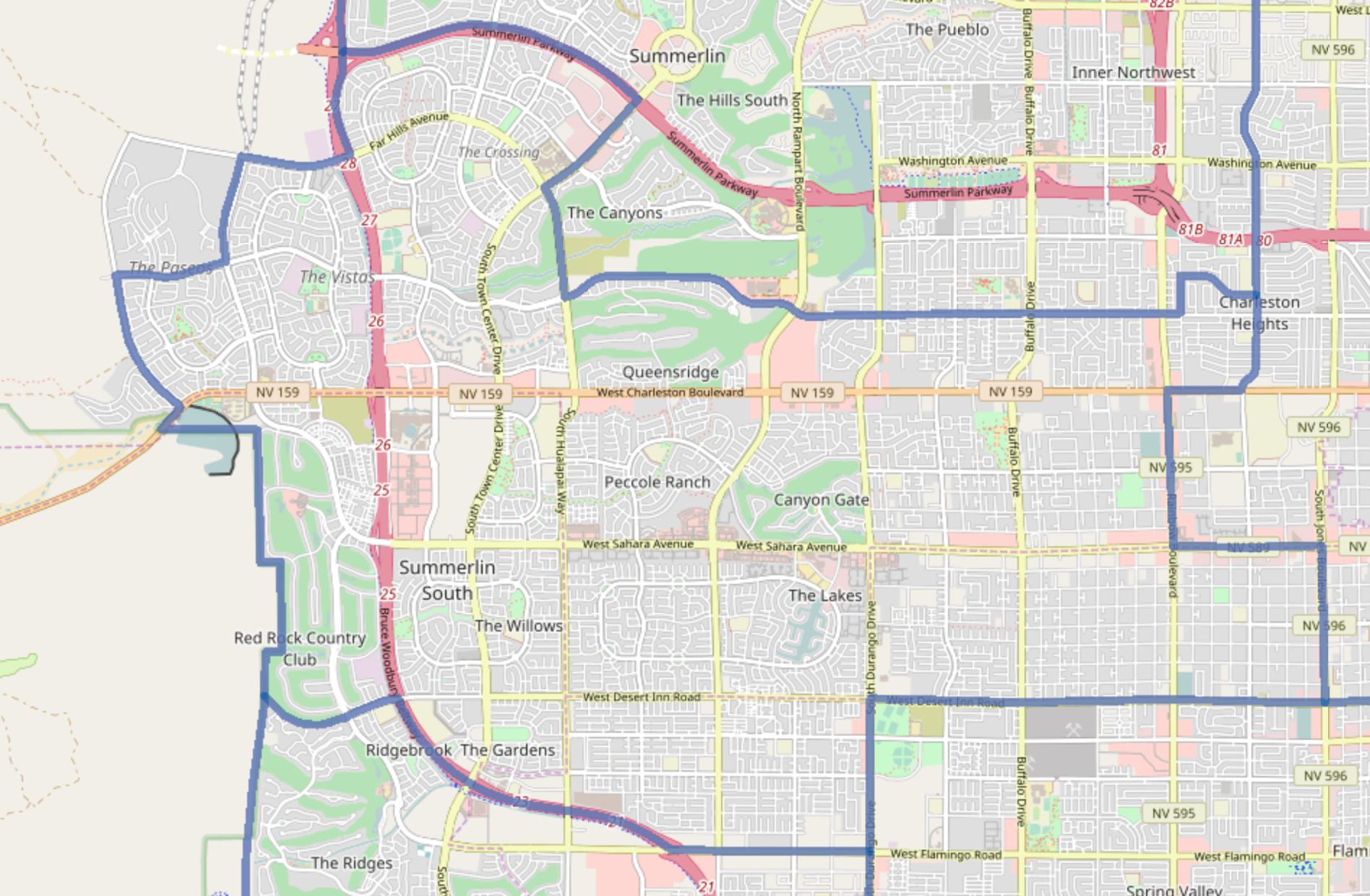
Closeup map of District 8

== Geography and demographics ==
District 8 is based in the Las Vegas Valley in Clark County, including parts of Las Vegas, Summerlin South, and Spring Valley.

The district overlaps with Nevada's 1st and 3rd congressional districts, and with the 2nd and 5th districts of the Nevada Assembly. The surface area of District 8 is 24 square miles (62 km^{2}), and its perimeter is 28.2 miles (45.4 km).

According to the 2010 Census, the 8th district had a population of 128,218 – 0.3% below the ideal. Compared to the rest of the state, the district has a relatively high proportion of Asian Americans, and a relatively low proportion of Hispanics and Latinos. The district's population is older than the Nevada average; just over 50% is 40 years old or older, compared to 45% statewide. The inhabitants of District 8 are also better-educated and wealthier than the state at-large, with a median household income of $65,000 compared to $53,000 statewide, and a poverty rate of 10%.

== Recent election results ==
Nevada Senators are elected to staggered four-year terms; since 2012 redistricting, the 8th district has held elections in midterm years.

=== 2022 ===
2022 Nevada State Senate election, District 8
Party	Candidate	Votes	%
Democratic	Marilyn Dondero Loop (incumbent)	26,698	50.7
Republican	Joey Paulos	25,944	49.3
Total votes		52,642	100
Democratic hold			

== Historical election results ==
=== 2018 ===
2018 Nevada State Senate election, District 8
Primary election
Party	Candidate	Votes	%
Republican	Valerie Weber	2,533	40.3
Republican	Dan Rodimer	2,391	38.0
Republican	Elizabeth Helgelien	1,365	21.7
Total votes		6,289	100
Democratic	Marilyn Dondero Loop	4,590	65.7
Democratic	Stephanie Alvarado	2,398	34.3
Total votes		6,988	100
General election
Democratic	Marilyn Dondero Loop	25,777	51.6
Republican	Valerie Weber	24,154	48.4
Total votes		49,931	100
Democratic gain from Independent			

=== 2016 partisan switch ===
After the 2016 election, Republican incumbent Patricia Farley announced her intention to switch her party registration to nonpartisan and caucus with Democrats for the 2017 legislative session. Farley justified her switch by saying, "My constituents come before party labels, and I believe this is the best way to represent them." She did not seek re-election in 2018.

=== 2014 ===
In 2014, term-limited incumbent Republican Barbara Cegavske successfully ran for Nevada Secretary of State. Republican Patricia Farley, Democrat Marilyn Dondero Loop, and Independent American Jon Kamerath ran to succeed her in what the Las Vegas Review-Journal called one of "three critical seats which [would] decide which party [would control] the Senate."

Both major parties held primaries. On the Republican side, Farley, a construction businesswoman endorsed by the Senate Republican Caucus, faced Clayton Hurst and Lisa Myers. Farley won with over 50% of the vote. For Democrats, Loop, an assemblywoman and former teacher, was challenged by Garrett LeDuff, whose opposition the Las Vegas Review-Journal called "token." Loop defeated LeDuff with over 80% of the vote.

During the general election campaign, Loop said she supported raising funding for public education in order to raise teacher's wages, among other things. She had no position on Question 3, which would have implemented a 2% margins tax on business to increase funding for public schools, because she argued it would hurt small businesses. Farley, meanwhile, opposed the ballot measure, and said she advocated school choice. Kamerath, a licensed practical nurse, opposed Question 3 as well.

As of October, Loop had out-raised Farley $340,000 to $285,000. Polling showed Farley with a small advantage. Republican pollster The Tarrance Group put Farley over Loop 43% to 36%, while Democratic pollster Greenberg Quinlan Rosner Research gave Farley a smaller 46-44% edge. The polls successfully predicted the winner, but underestimated the margin; Farley defeated Loop 57-39%. With Farley's win and other wins elsewhere, the GOP gained control of the Senate.

2014 Nevada State Senate election, District 8
Party	Candidate	Votes	%
Republican	Patricia Farley	2,814	52.0
Republican	Clayton Hurst	2,054	38.0
Republican	Lisa Myers	543	10.0
Total votes		5,411	100
Democratic	Marilyn Dondero Loop	2,844	83.0
Democratic	Garrett LeDuff	582	17.0
Total votes		3,426	100
General election
Republican	Patricia Farley	16,205	57.0
Democratic	Marilyn Dondero Loop	11,092	39.0
Independent American	Jon Kamerath	1,119	3.9
Total votes		28,416	100
Republican hold			

=== Federal and statewide results ===
Year	Office	Results
2020	President	Biden 49.9 – 48.1%
2018	Senate	Rosen 50.8 – 46.1%
2018	Governor	Sisolak 50.4 – 45.8%
2016	President	Clinton 47.6 – 46.6%
2012	President	Romney 49.5 – 48.9%
2012	Senate	Heller 48.5 – 43.9%

== History ==
The 8th district was created after the 1990 census. It was originally a north–south district stretching from Spring Valley up towards North-Central Las Vegas, but has shifted westward as the population has grown. The borders of the current 8th district were drawn during the reapportionment in 2011 after the 2010 Census. The new districts became effective for filing for office and for nominating and electing senators on January 1, 2012. They went into effect for all other purposes on November 7 – the day after Election Day, when most new senator terms started. The area which District 8 occupies is defined in the Nevada Revised Statutes using census tracts, block groups, and blocks. Barbara Cegavske, the current Nevada Secretary of State, is a former occupant of the seat.
