= Nevada's 2nd Senate district =

American legislative district

Coordinates: 36.19°N 115.09°W

Nevada's 2nd State Senate district
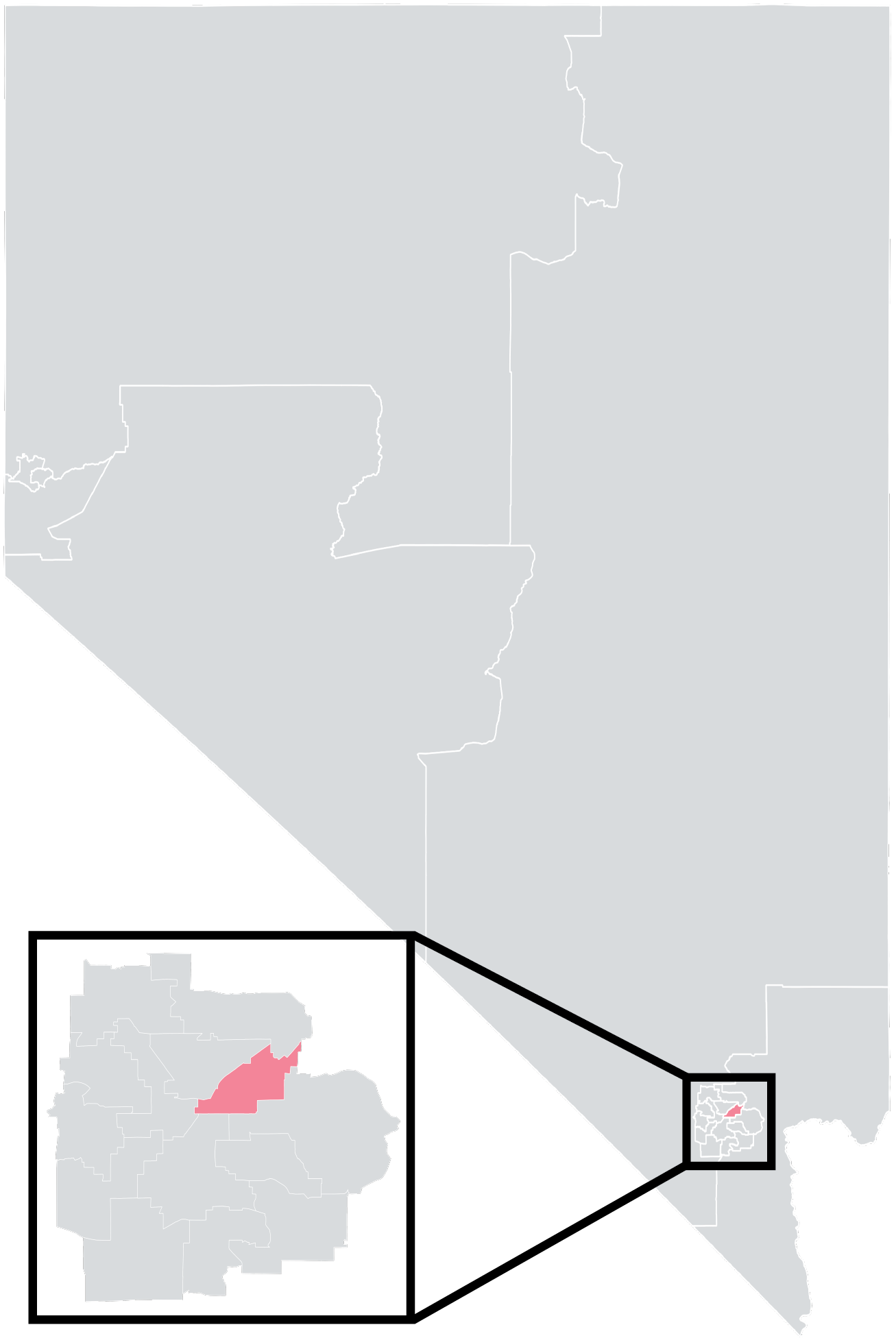
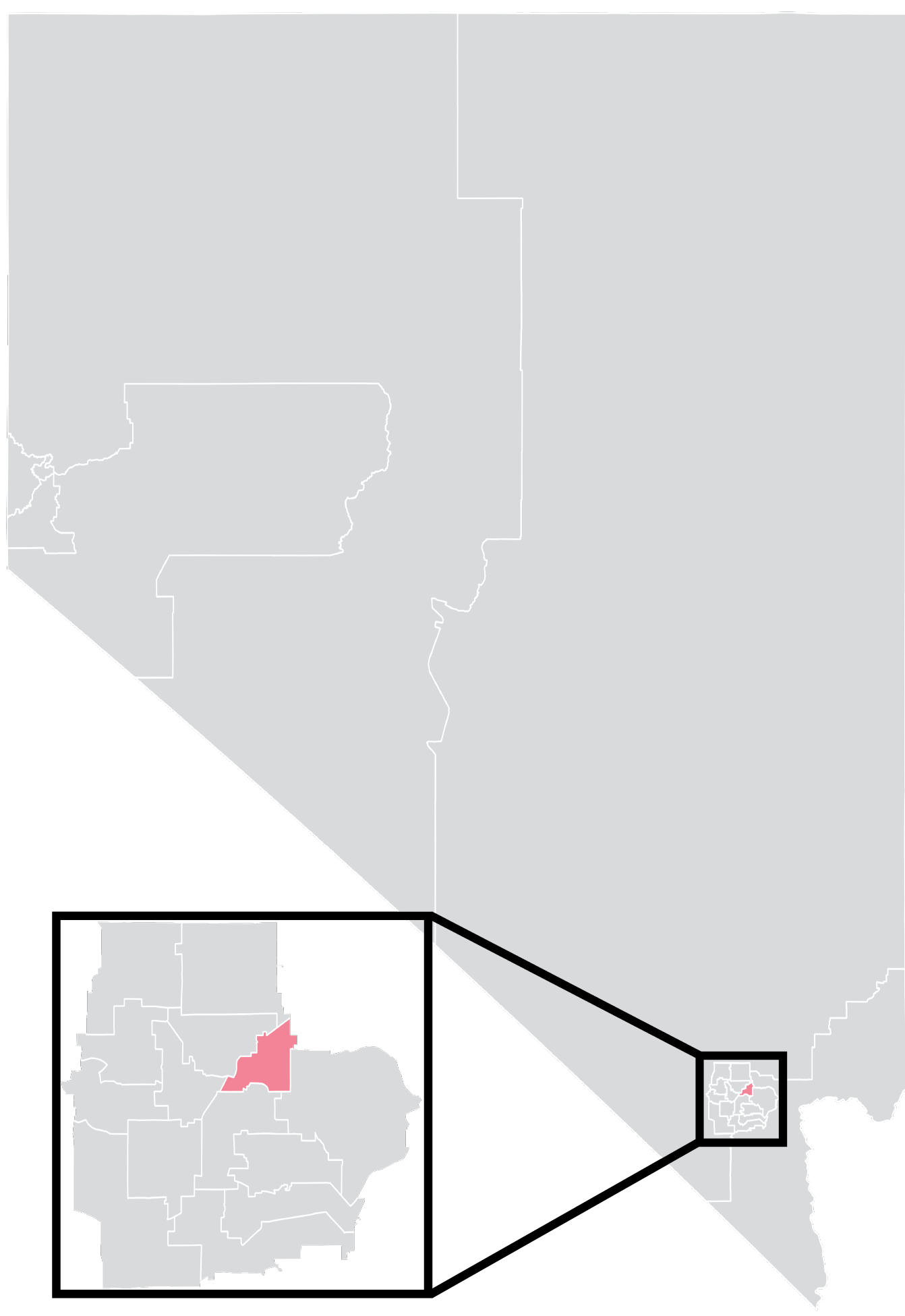
Senator
Edgar Flores; D–Las Vegas
- Registration: 61.9% Democratic; 16.5% Republican; 15.8% No party preference
- Demographics: 15% White; 12% Black; 67% Hispanic; 3% Asian; 2% Other
- Population (2018): 122,741
- Registered voters: 40,510

Nevada's 2nd Senate district is one of 21 districts in the Nevada Senate. It has been represented by Democrat Edgar Flores since 2022, succeeding fellow Democrat Mo Denis.

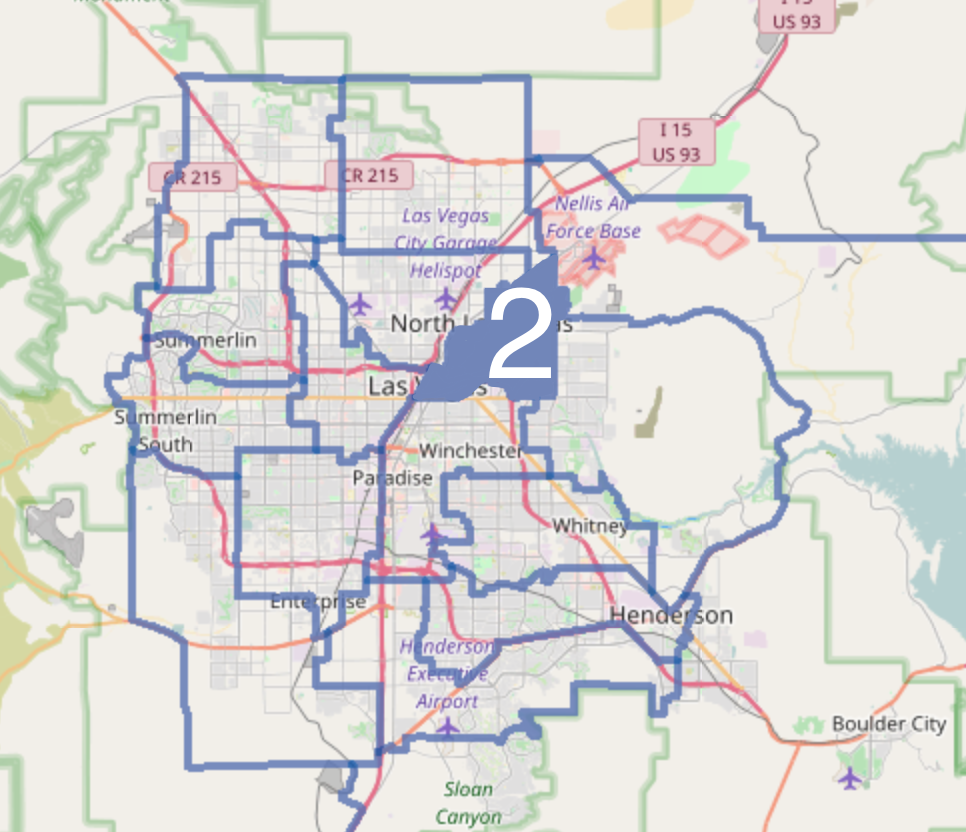
Closeup on the Las Vegas Valley with District 2 colored blue

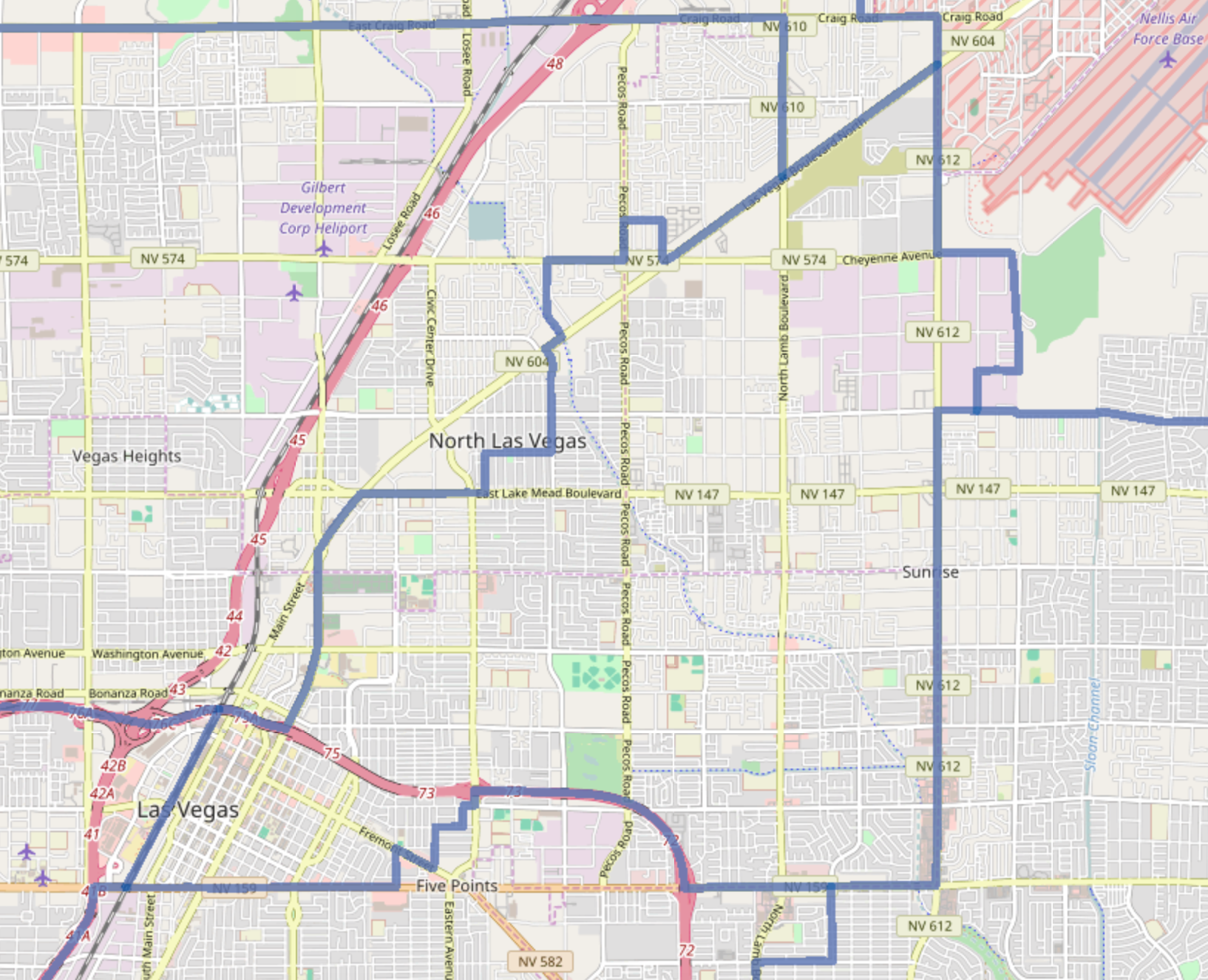
Closeup map of District 2

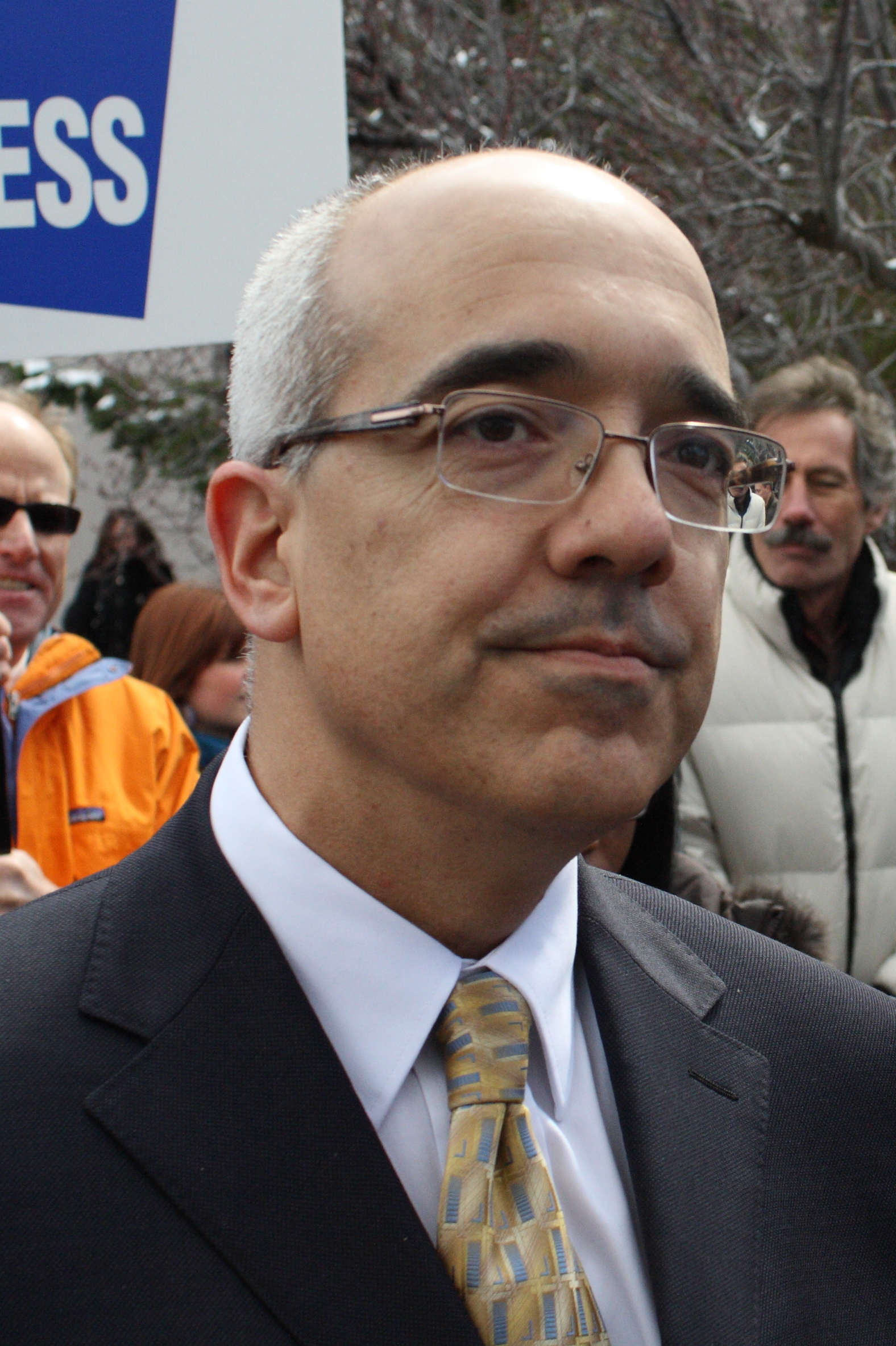
Democrat Mo Denis has represented District 2 since 2010

== Geography and demographics ==
District 2 is based in Las Vegas' Downtown, also covering smaller parts of North Las Vegas and Sunrise Manor in Clark County.

The district overlaps with Nevada's 1st and 4th congressional districts, and with the 11th and 28th districts of the Nevada Assembly. The district has a surface area of 15.9 square miles (41 km^{2}), making it the smallest Senate district in Nevada, and a perimeter of 22.4 miles (36.0 km).

According to the 2010 census, the district had a population of 128,715 – 0.09% above the ideal. It is the only Senate district in Nevada with a Hispanic/Latino majority, though others have Hispanic pluralities. The population of District 2 is younger than Nevada's average, with over 65% of its inhabitants below the age of 40. The median household income is more than $20,000 lower than average, and 45% of those over 25 don't have a high school diploma. The poverty rate is well over twice as high as in the rest of Nevada. The district also has the lowest percentage of registered voters of any Senate district in Nevada.

== Recent election results ==
Nevada Senators are elected to staggered four-year terms; since 2012 redistricting, the 2nd district has held elections in midterm years.

=== 2022 ===
2022 Nevada State Senate election, District 2
Party	Candidate	Votes	%
Democratic	Edgar Flores	12,442	69.9
Republican	Leo Henderson	5,350	30.1
Total votes		17,792	100
Democratic hold			

== Historical election results ==
=== 2018 ===
2018 Nevada State Senate election, District 2
Party	Candidate	Votes	%
Democratic	Mo Denis (incumbent)	13,717	79.5
Republican	Calvin Border	3,537	20.5
Total votes		17,254	100
Democratic hold			

=== 2014 ===
In 2014, Denis faced off against Independent American Party member Louis Baker, a contractor, auctioneer, and investor; no Republican filed for the seat. Denis, then the Senate Majority Leader, won with over 75% of the vote, the highest margin for any Nevada Senate race in 2014 (excluding uncontested races). After Democrats lost control of the chamber, Denis did not seek re-election as Democratic leader, and was replaced by Aaron D. Ford as Minority Leader.

2014 Nevada State Senate election, District 2
Party	Candidate	Votes	%
Democratic	Mo Denis (incumbent)	5,683	76.4
Independent American	Louis Baker	1,758	23.6
Total votes		7,441	100
Democratic hold			

=== Federal and statewide results ===
Year	Office	Results
2020	President	Biden 72.4 – 25.2%
2018	Senate	Rosen 76.0 – 18.6%
2018	Governor	Sisolak 73.5 – 18.9%
2016	President	Clinton 76.1 – 18.8%
2012	President	Obama 79.8 – 18.3%
2012	Senate	Berkley 71.8 – 18.4%

== History ==
The present 2nd district came into existence when the senatorial districts were reapportioned after the 2010 Census. The revised borders went into effect on January 1, 2012 for filing for office, and for nominating and electing senators. They became effective for all other purposes on November 7 of the same year – the day after Election Day, when most senator terms began. In the Nevada Revised Statutes, the area of District 2 is defined using census tracts, block groups, and blocks.

Mo Denis had represented the old 2nd district, which followed similar boundaries but did not include Downtown Las Vegas. Denis continued to represent the newly-drawn district from 2012-2014 despite the new boundaries, and was re-elected in 2014.
