= Nevada's 21st Senate district =

American legislative district

Nevada's 21st State Senate district
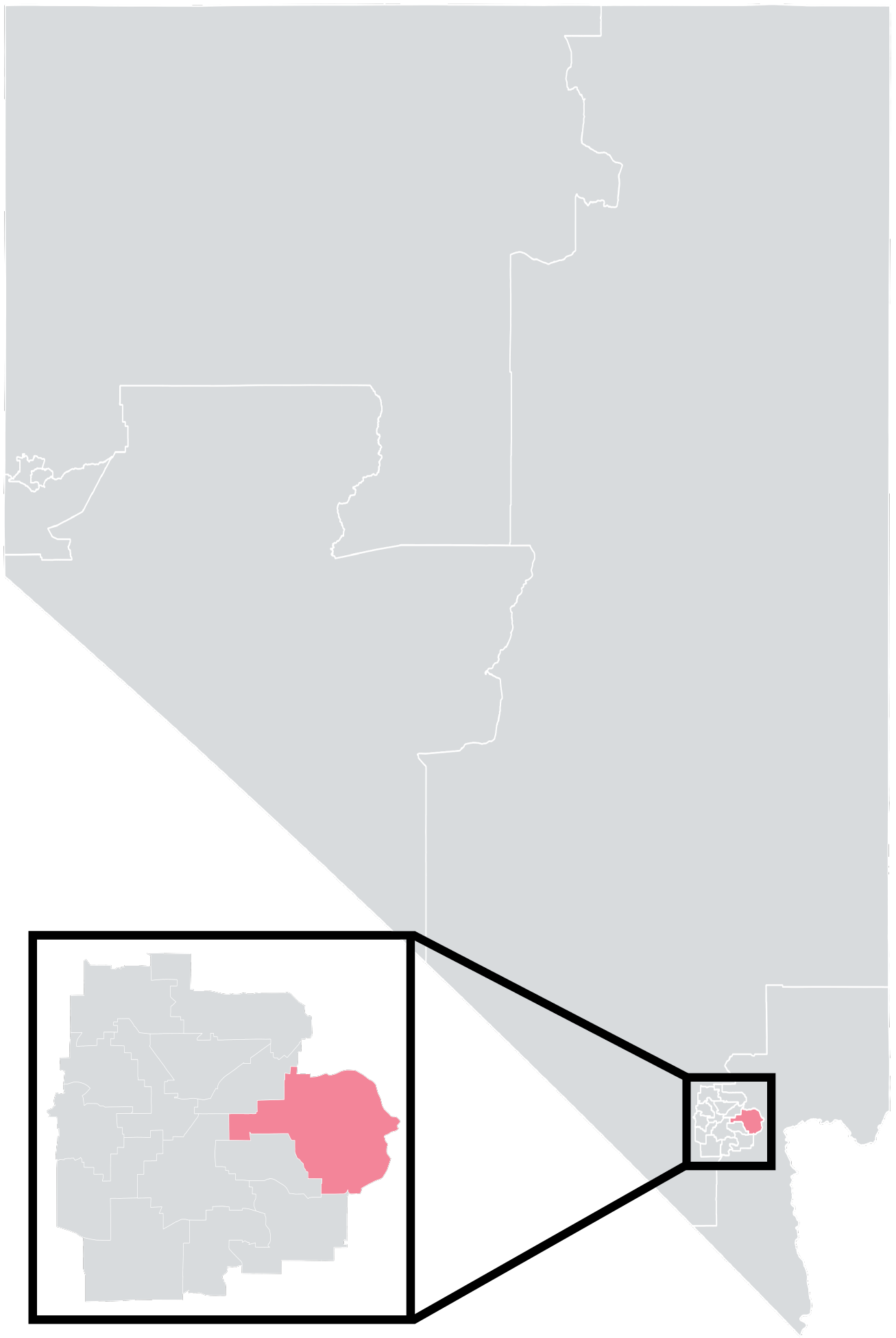
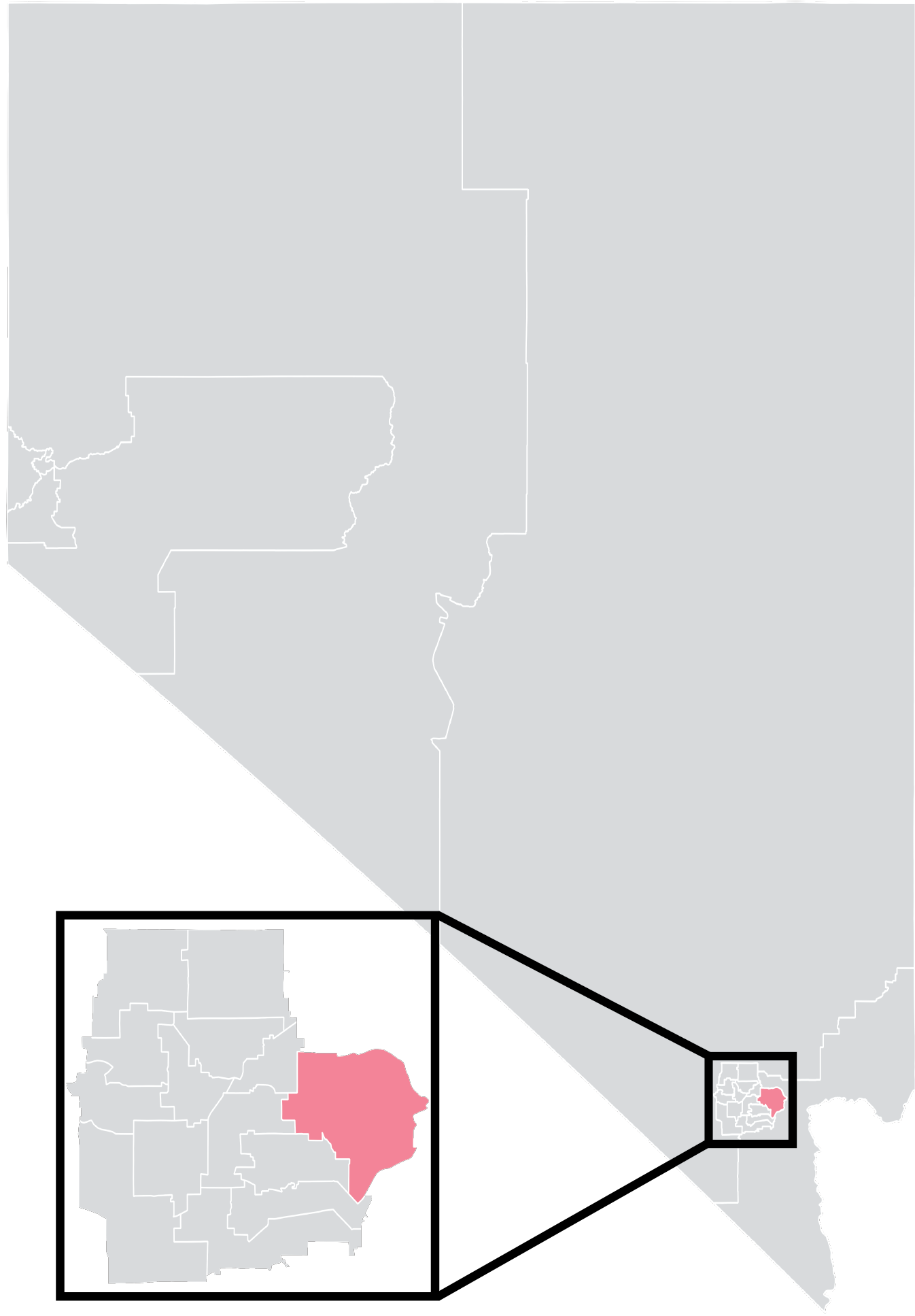
Senator
James Ohrenschall; D–Las Vegas
- Registration: 51.2% Democratic; 27.4% Republican; 15.9% No party preference
- Demographics: 31% White; 11% Black; 45% Hispanic; 8% Asian; 1% Native American; 1% Hawaiian/Pacific Islander; 3% Other
- Population (2018): 135,468
- Registered voters: 57,616

Nevada's 21st Senate district is one of 21 districts in the Nevada Senate. It has been represented by Democrat James Ohrenschall since 2018, succeeding fellow Democrat Mark Manendo.

== Geography ==
District 21 is based in eastern Las Vegas in Clark County, covering parts of the city proper, as well as portions of Sunrise Manor, Whitney, and Henderson.

The district overlaps with Nevada's 1st, 3rd, and 4th congressional districts, and with the 12th and 14th districts of the Nevada Assembly.

== Recent election results ==
Nevada Senators are elected to staggered four-year terms; since 2012 redistricting, the 21st district has held elections in midterm years.

=== 2022 ===
2022 Nevada State Senate election, District 21
Party	Candidate	Votes	%
Democratic	James Ohrenschall (incumbent)	18,428	55.8
Republican	April Larsen	14,603	44.2
Total votes		33,031	100
Democratic hold			

== Historical election results ==
=== 2018 ===
2018 Nevada State Senate election, District 21
Primary election
Party	Candidate	Votes	%
Democratic	James Ohrenschall	3,355	58.7
Democratic	Christine Glazer	1,522	26.6
Democratic	Jay Craddock	841	14.7
Total votes		5,718	100
General election
Democratic	James Ohrenschall	22,391	62.0
Republican	Ron McGinnis	13,721	38.0
Total votes		36,112	100
Democratic hold			

=== 2014 ===
2014 Nevada State Senate election, District 21
Party	Candidate	Votes	%
Democratic	Mark Manendo (incumbent)	9,597	53.5
Republican	Ron McGinnis	8,328	46.5
Total votes		17,925	100
Democratic hold			

=== Federal and statewide results ===
Year	Office	Results
2020	President	Biden 57.0 – 41.0%
2018	Senate	Rosen 58.9 – 36.4%
2018	Governor	Sisolak 57.6 – 36.8%
2016	President	Clinton 58.5 – 35.9%
2012	President	Obama 62.3 – 36.0%
2012	Senate	Berkley 55.2 – 34.9%
