= Don Gustavson =

American politician

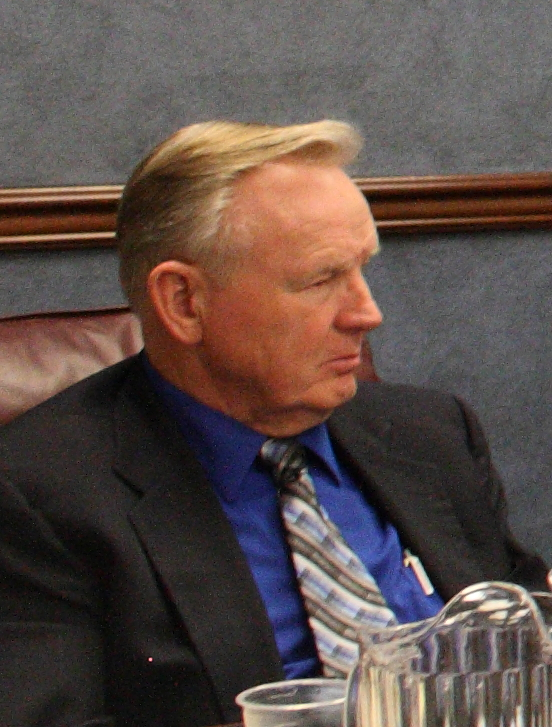
- Gustavson in 2011

Member of the Nevada Senate from the 14th district
- In office November 3, 2010 – November 7, 2018
- Preceded by: Maurice Washington
- Succeeded by: Ira Hansen

Member of the Nevada Assembly from the 32nd district
- In office November 5, 2008 – November 3, 2010
- Preceded by: John Marvel
- Succeeded by: Ira Hansen

Member of the Nevada Assembly from the 30th district
- In office 2002–2004
- Preceded by: Debbie Smith
- Succeeded by: Debbie Smith

Member of the Nevada Assembly from the 32nd district
- In office 1996–2002
- Preceded by: Patricia Tripple
- Succeeded by: John Marvel

Personal details
- Born: Donald Gary Gustavson; July 23, 1943 (age 83) Culver City, California, U.S.
- Party: Republican
- Spouse: Cathy Gustavson
- Children: Donald G. Gustavson II; Donna D. Stoller; Kerry J. Saulnier
- Education: Santa Monica Junior College & Western Nevada College
- Occupation: Retired Professional Driver

Donald Gary Gustavson (born July 23, 1943) is an American politician. He is a former Republican member of the Nevada Senate, representing the 14th district, formerly called Washoe District 2. He was elected to the position in 2010, running for the seat previously held by term-limited Senator Maurice Washington. Prior to serving in the Nevada Senate he was a member of the Nevada Assembly representing two districts in his six regular and six special sessions.
