= Lori Lipman Brown =

American politician

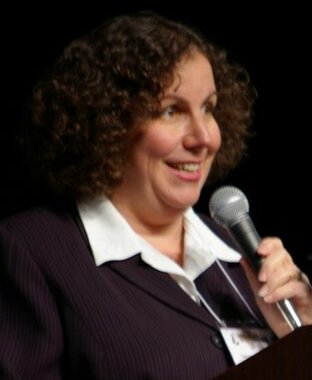
- Brown speaking at The Amazing Meeting

Member of the Nevada Senate
- In office 1992–1994

Personal details
- Born: June 17, 1958 (age 68) New York, U.S.
- Known for: State Senator and secular activist

Lori Lipman Brown (born June 17, 1958) is an American politician and activist from the state of Nevada. She has served as a state senator, lobbyist, lawyer, educator, and social worker supporter. Additionally, her political views have been secularist and civil libertarian and describes herself as an atheist humanist Jew. She served as a Nevada State Senator from 1992 to 1994, advocating for repeals of consensual sex crimes. This led to her being named Civil Libertarian of the Year by the Nevadan chapter of the American Civil Liberties Union. Additionally, she has organized numerous events for the Humanist Association of Las Vegas and Southern Nevada, the Secular Student Alliance, and the American Humanist Association. She was defeated for reelection to the State Senate by Kathy Augustine in 1994.

Outside of the secularist and nontheistic movement, Brown worked in education and social work. From 1996 to 2000 she was the National Education Association's diversity trainer. Formerly a private lawyer, she taught United States constitutional law, education law, and American history through the University of Phoenix. Additionally, she taught high school drama, English, and speech and helped found Eldorado High School's Gay-Straight Student Alliance. For social work friendly legislation, she won the Legislator of the Year by the Nevada chapter of the National Association of Social Workers.

Brown served as the founding director of the Secular Coalition for America from 2005 to 2009. In this position, she was the first Congressional lobbyist explicitly representing nontheistic Americans. During her directorship, the organization grew from a coalition of 5 national organizations with one staff, to a coalition of 10 national organizations with six staff. Brown currently works for NES Associates, an IT firm in Alexandria, Virginia.

On November 29, 2005, she appeared on The O'Reilly Factor to debate Christmas’s recognition as a national holiday from a secularist point of view.

On August 29, 2008, she appeared on The Colbert Report in an interview with Stephen Colbert.

== Controversy ==
During her campaign for reelection in 1994, Brown's political opponent, Kathy Augustine, along with Senators William Raggio, Raymond Rawson, and Sue Lowden, accused her through campaign ads of refusing to say the Pledge of Allegiance and for opposing legislative prayer.
