= Maurice Washington =

American politician (born 1956)

Member of the Nevada Senate from the Washoe 2nd district
- In office 1994–2010
- Succeeded by: Don Gustavson

Personal details
- Born: July 25, 1956 (age 69) Albuquerque, New Mexico
- Party: Republican
- Spouse: Donna

Maurice Washington (born July 25, 1956) is an American politician. He was a Republican member of the Nevada Senate, representing Washoe County District 2.

Maurice Washington is a candidate for Washoe County Commission, District 4.
