= Mo Denis =

President pro tempore of the Nevada Senate

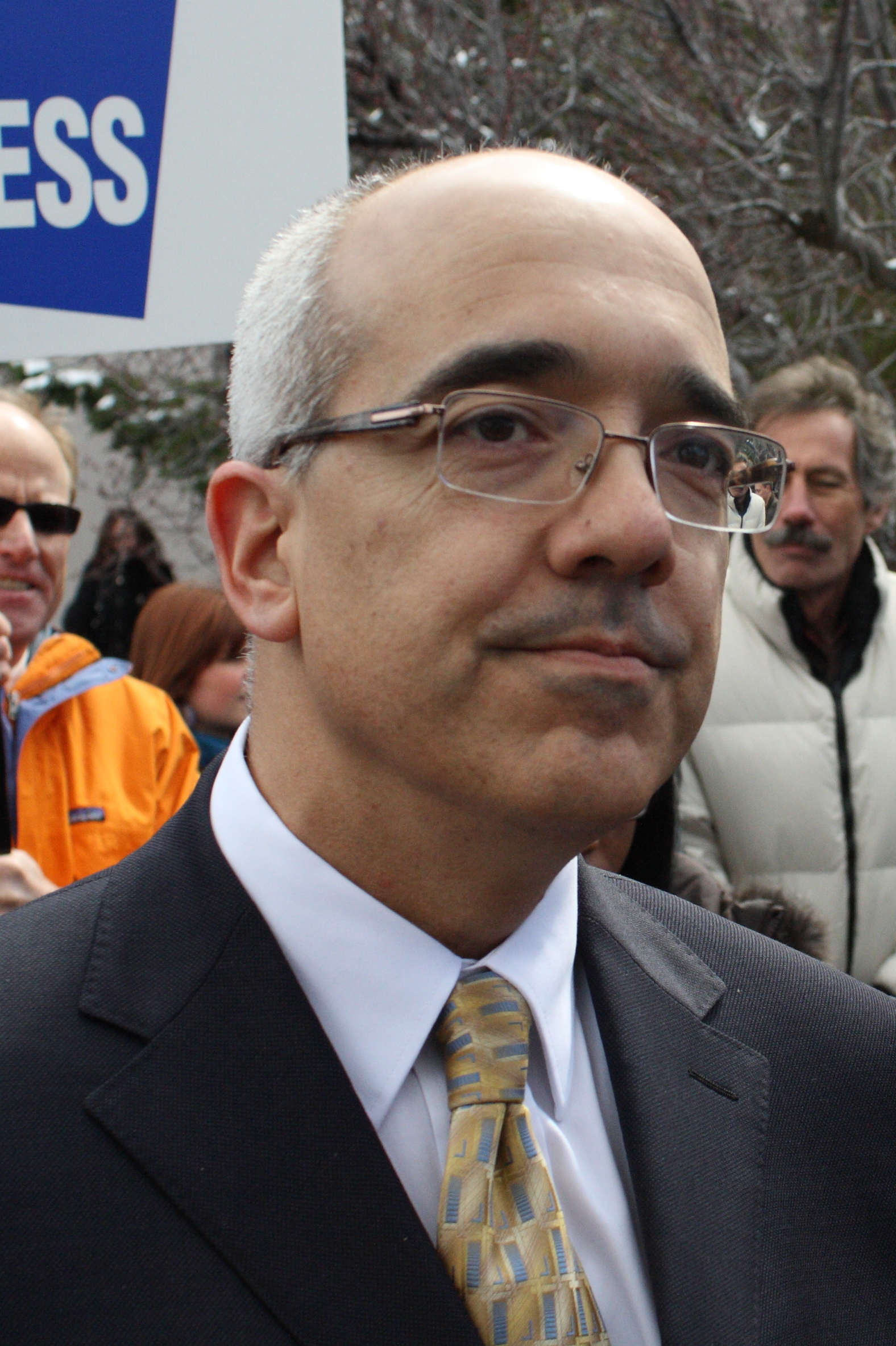

President of the Nevada Senate
- Acting
- In office September 17, 2021 – December 16, 2021
- Preceded by: Kate Marshall
- Succeeded by: Lisa Cano Burkhead

President pro tempore of the Nevada Senate
- In office November 9, 2016 – November 9, 2022
- Preceded by: Joe Hardy
- Succeeded by: Pat Spearman

Majority Leader of the Nevada Senate
- In office February 4, 2013 – November 5, 2014
- Preceded by: Steven Horsford
- Succeeded by: Michael Roberson

Member of the Nevada Senate from the 2nd district
- In office November 3, 2010 – November 9, 2022
- Preceded by: Maggie Carlton
- Succeeded by: Edgar Flores

Member of the Nevada Assembly from the 28th district
- In office November 3, 2004 – November 3, 2010
- Preceded by: Vonne Chowning
- Succeeded by: Lucy Flores

Personal details
- Born: August 9, 1961 (age 65) New York City New York, U.S.
- Party: Democratic
- Spouse: Susan Cook
- Children: 5
- Education: Brigham Young University (BA)

Moises Denis (born August 9, 1961) is an American politician who served as President pro tempore of the Nevada Senate between 2016 and 2022. A member of the Democratic Party, he represented the 2nd district in the Nevada Senate between 2010 and 2022, covering parts of the eastern Las Vegas Valley. He was previously a member of the Nevada Assembly from 2004 to 2010, representing Assembly District 28 in the same area.

== Biography ==
Denis was born in New York City to parents who had immigrated from Cuba. Denis is Mormon. He served a mission for the Church of Jesus Christ of Latter-day Saints in Uruguay. He studied at Brigham Young University. He has also served as a bishop in the LDS Church as well as in other positions. He is a cousin of United States Senator from Florida Marco Rubio. In 2019, an interview with Denis' sister stated that she was concerned for those unable to afford housing and living out of their cars. Denis is a computer technician.

== Political career ==
Denis served three terms in the Nevada Assembly from 2004 to 2010, and served three term as a state senator between 2010 and 2022. He has frequently run unopposed or won lopsided victories. Denis led his caucus' re-election efforts in the 2012 cycle and served as Senate Majority Leader from 2013 to 2014. In December 2011, Denis resigned from his job with the Nevada Public Utilities Commission following an alleged conflict between his executive and legislative roles. Denis is the first Latino person to serve as Majority Leader of the Nevada Senate (or leader of any caucus).

== Electoral history ==
- 2018 Denis was unopposed in the primary election. He defeated Republican candidate Cal Border in the general election with 13,717 votes (79.50%).
- 2014 Denis was unopposed in the primary election. He defeated Independent American Party candidate Louis Baker in the general election with 5,683 votes (76.37%).
- 2010 Incumbent Senator Maggie Carlton was term-limited out of Senate District 2, which overlapped with Denis' Assembly district. Denis ran to replace her and was unopposed in both the primary and general elections.
- 2008 Denis was unopposed in the primary. He defeated Republican candidate Tino Mendoza in the general election with 4,664 votes (78.86%).
- 2006 Denis was unopposed in both the primary and general elections.
- 2004 After incumbent Vonne Chowning did not seek re-election in Assembly District 28, Denis won the primary with 800 votes (51.38%) against Eddie Flores and Rosa Mendoza. He then won the general election with 4,218 votes (75.51%) against Republican nominee Benjamin Bell.
- 2002 Denis ran in the Democratic primary for Assembly District 28, but was defeated by incumbent Assemblywoman Vonne Chowning who had 601 votes (52.72%) compared to Denis' 539 votes (47.28%).

Nevada Senate
Preceded by Steven Horsford	Majority Leader of the Nevada Senate; 2013–2014	Succeeded by Michael Roberson
Preceded by Joe Hardy	President pro tempore of the Nevada Senate; 2016–2022	Succeeded by Pat Spearman
Political offices
Preceded by Kate Marshall	President of the Nevada Senate; Acting; 2021	Succeeded by Lisa Cano Burkhead
