= Roberta Lange =

American politician

Member of the Nevada Senate from the 7th district
- Incumbent
- Assumed office November 4, 2020
- Preceded by: David Parks

Chair of the Nevada Democratic Party
- In office 2011–2017
- Succeeded by: William McCurdy II

Personal details
- Born: 1957 (age 68–69) Lancaster, California, U.S.
- Party: Democratic
- Spouse: Ken Lange
- Children: 4
- Education: Los Angeles Baptist College (BS)

Roberta Lange (born 1957) is an American politician serving as a member of the Nevada Senate from the 7th district. She assumed office on November 4, 2020.

== Early life and education ==
Lange was born in Lancaster, California in 1957 and raised in Whitefish, Montana. She earned a Bachelor of Science degree in physical education from Los Angeles Baptist College and a teaching certificate in K–12 education from Pacific Lutheran University.

== Career ==
Lange worked as a teacher in Washington before moving to Las Vegas in 1995. During the 2006 Nevada gubernatorial election, Lange worked as the finance director for Dina Titus. She was also the Nevada state director for the Bill Richardson 2008 presidential campaign. From 2011 to 2017, she was chair of the Nevada Democratic Party. She was also a member of the Democratic National Committee's executive committee. She was elected to the Nevada Senate in 2020. She also serves as vice chair of the Senate Legislative Operations and Elections Committee.
