= Valerie Weber =

American politician

Member of the Nevada State Assembly from the 5th district
- In office November 6, 2002 – November 5, 2008
- Preceded by: Barbara Cegavske
- Succeeded by: Marilyn Dondero Loop

Personal details
- Born: December 4, 1954 (age 71) Castro Valley, California
- Party: Republican

Valerie Weber (born December 4, 1954) is an American politician who served in the Nevada State Assembly from the 5th district from 2002 to 2008.
