= Lucy Flores =

American lawyer and former politician

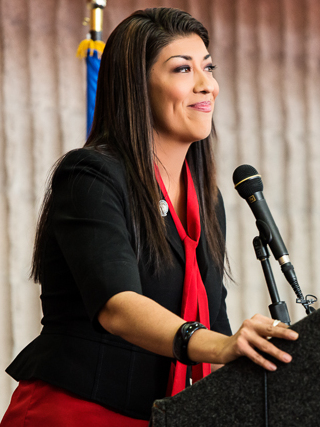

Member of the Nevada Assembly from the 28th district
- In office November 3, 2010 – November 5, 2014
- Preceded by: Mo Denis
- Succeeded by: Edgar Flores

Personal details
- Born: October 24, 1979 (age 46) Glendale, California, U.S.
- Party: Democratic
- Education: College of Southern Nevada; University of Southern California (BA); University of Nevada, Las Vegas (JD)
- Website: Official website

Lucy Flores (born October 24, 1979) is an American lawyer and former politician. A member of the Democratic Party, she was a member of the Nevada State Assembly representing the 28th district in the eastern Las Vegas Valley from 2010 to 2014. She unsuccessfully ran for Lieutenant Governor of Nevada in 2014, losing to Republican nominee Mark Hutchison.

== Early life and education ==
Flores is one of 13 children. Only one brother graduated high school, and all of her sisters became pregnant in their teens. Flores's mother left her family when she was nine, and her father worked multiple jobs, so she had to care for her younger siblings. When her mother left, Flores's school performance suffered, and she became involved with local gangs. She spent months in juvenile detention after stealing a car. Leslie Camp, Flores's parole officer, became an important role model for her and helped her turn her life around. Flores's difficult early life informs her political views, and she advocates job retraining and educational opportunities to help others who came from difficult backgrounds.

Flores dropped out of Rancho High School, but passed the GED test. After working as a receptionist and office manager, she attended the College of Southern Nevada, then transferred to and graduated from the University of Southern California. She earned a J.D. degree from University of Nevada, Las Vegas in 2010. While there, she pushed the school to create a course on investigating potential wrongful convictions.

In 2013, while explaining why she supported a sex education bill, Flores said that she had an abortion when she was 16. She later received death threats for the statement.

== Career ==
=== State Assembly ===
A progressive Democrat, Flores was elected to the Nevada State Assembly in 2010, and became vice-chair of the Nevada Hispanic Legislative Caucus in 2012. She became one of the first Latina members of the Nevada Assembly, representing the neighborhood she grew up in. She served on the transportation, ways and means, and legislative operations and elections committees. She was reelected in 2012 without opposition. In 2012, she became an assistant majority whip.

Flores introduced an education bill to use end-of-course final exams in high school rather than Nevada's proficiency exams. Other bills she introduced were one to allow domestic violence abuse victims to break leases to avoid the abuser, and one that would require professional sporting events to have medical personnel present. She also helped to organize a conference of teachers and legislators on how to improve education success among Latinos. She supports expanding early childhood education, and considers education her most important priority as a legislator. In 2013 she introduced a bill to require chain restaurants to post calorie counts. The measure passed both houses of the Nevada legislature, but was vetoed by Governor Brian Sandoval.

Flores established a PAC, Impacto Fund, to help elect Latinos in the Southwest United States. She believed Latinos were underrepresented in politics, and that there should be an effort to recruit and encourage them as candidates.

In the 2012 presidential election, Flores was a campaign surrogate for President Barack Obama's reelection campaign, where, among other work, she debated members of the Republican Party on Univision. While campaigning, Flores was hospitalized for exhaustion.

Flores was honored with the Excellence in Legal Clinics Award by UNLV in 2010 and the Hubbard Award by the Mexican-American Alumni Association of USC in 2007. Latism named her the best politician at using social media to reach Latinos. In 2013, she was named a Rodel Fellow by the Aspen Institute. She has been affiliated with the National Association of Latino Elected and Appointed Officials, the Nevada Council of the Blind, Seniors United, and the Stonewall Democratic Club of Southern Nevada.

=== Lieutenant governor campaign ===
Flores decided against seeking reelection to her Assembly seat for the 28th district, choosing instead to run for Lieutenant Governor of Nevada. Her seat was taken by Edgar Flores (no relation).

In the 2014 Lieutenant Governor of Nevada elections, Flores was defeated by Republican Mark Hutchison in a landslide, 60% to 34%, despite personal appearances by then-vice-president Joe Biden and an endorsement by then-Senate Leader Harry Reid. The election was seen as particularly important because Nevada Governor Brian Sandoval, a Republican, was speculated to possibly vacate his office (after winning the reelection bid) to run for the United States Senate in 2016. (Contrary to speculation, he opted not to run.)

=== Congressional campaign ===
In April 2015, Flores announced her candidacy for the United States House of Representatives seat in Nevada's 4th congressional district against incumbent Republican Cresent Hardy in the 2016 election. The primary was crowded, including State Senator (and eventual winner) Ruben Kihuen, as well as future Congresswoman Susie Lee, former Assemblyman Morse Arberry Jr., and a number of others.

Flores endorsed Senator Bernie Sanders in the 2016 Democratic presidential primaries, saying "this is about real lives" and that "this is a system that isn’t working for the everyday person . . . It’s one of the reasons why I decided to endorse Bernie Sanders." On April 13, 2016, Sanders emailed his supporters asking them to split a contribution to his campaign and Flores' congressional campaign. His reason for this request was that EMILY's List, a group that helps elect pro-choice female Democrats, including Sanders' opponent Hillary Clinton, endorsed Flores' opponent Susie Lee instead of her, even though they had endorsed her three times previously. Sanders claimed that the group did not endorse Flores because she had endorsed Sanders. In another email the same day, he asked recipients to split their contributions four ways, adding Zephyr Teachout and Pramila Jayapal.

Flores took second place in the primary, with 7,854 votes (25.66%) to Kihuen's 12,221 (39.94%). Prominent commentator Jon Ralston described Kihuen's victory as a result of his having been "anointed" by Harry Reid. Kihuen went on to win the general election and serve in Congress for one term, before retiring due to multiple allegations of sexual misconduct.

=== Subsequent career ===
Flores continues advocating for progressive causes by serving on the board of directors of Our Revolution, a political action organization affiliated with Bernie Sanders; and Let America Vote, a voting rights organization founded by former Missouri Secretary of State Jason Kander.

As of March 2019, Flores runs Luz Collective, a Los Angeles-based digital media company.

=== Allegations against Joe Biden ===
In March 2019, Flores wrote an op-ed for New York magazine's "The Cut" alleging that then Vice President Joe Biden "inappropriately kissed and touched her after he offered to help her with her 2014 campaign" while the two were at a Las Vegas campaign rally. She stated that he walked up behind her, put his hands on her shoulders, smelled her hair, and planted a kiss on the back of her head. She wrote that, by acting in this manner, Biden had touched her in "an intimate way reserved for close friends, family, or romantic partners—and I felt powerless to do anything about it." Elizabeth Warren and Julián Castro said that they believed her story. Biden responded to her allegations and others with a video and a statement on Twitter, saying "I’ve heard what these women are saying...I will be more mindful about respecting personal space in the future.” Flores indicated in a statement and later interviews she felt his remarks were an insufficient response.
