= Mark Manendo =

American politician

Member of the Nevada Senate from the 21st district
- In office December 8, 2011 – July 18, 2017
- Preceded by: Newly created district
- Succeeded by: James Ohrenschall

Member of the Nevada Senate from the 7th district
- In office November 3, 2010 – December 7, 2011 Serving with David Parks
- Preceded by: Terry Care
- Succeeded by: Dual-member districts abolished

Member of the Nevada Assembly from the 18th district
- In office 1994–2010
- Preceded by: William Petrak
- Succeeded by: Richard Carrillo

Personal details
- Born: October 2, 1966 (age 60) Erie, Pennsylvania
- Party: Democratic
- Education: Chaparral High School, Area Technical Trade Center, and Clark County Community College
- Occupation: Assistant Director of Client Services, Collision Authority

Mark Manendo (born October 2, 1966) is a former Democratic member of the Nevada Senate, representing District 21. Manendo was elected as half of a dual-member district in 2010 in Clark No. 7 but in 2011 redistricting split the dual member district and renumbered his constituency to District 21.

The areas Senator Manendo represented were portions of Clark County which included areas of Las Vegas, Sunrise Manor, Whitney, Lake Las Vegas, part of Lake Mead National Recreation Area, and the Clark County Wetlands Park. He formerly served in the Nevada Assembly, representing Clark County District 18 from 1994 to 2010.

On July 18, 2017, Sen. Manendo resigned after the completion of an investigation into allegations of sexual harassment found "Senator Manendo violated the Legislature's anti-harassment policy; had engaged in multiple and repeated instances of inappropriate, offensive, and unacceptable behavior towards female staffers and lobbyists; and had attempted to interfere with the subsequent investigation into his conduct."

== Electoral history ==
Manendo was elected in 1994 and 1996 to the Nevada Assembly from the Clark County 18th District.

Nevada State Assembly, Clark District 18 Primary Election, 1998
Party	Candidate	Votes	%
Democratic	Dave Brown	578	23.39
Democratic	Mark Manendo	1,893	76.61

Nevada State Assembly, Clark District 18 General Election, 1998
Party	Candidate	Votes	%
Democratic	Mark Manendo	5,381	74.98
Republican	Patty Slack	1,873	25.82

Nevada State Assembly, Clark District 18 General Election, 2000
Party	Candidate	Votes	%
Democratic	Mark Manendo	7,810	100

Nevada State Assembly, Clark District 18 General Election, 2002
Party	Candidate	Votes	%
Republican	Ken Jarvis	3,589	35.26
Democratic	Mark Manendo	6,591	64.74

Nevada State Assembly, Clark District 18 General Election, 2004
Party	Candidate	Votes	%
Democratic	Mark Manendo	10,348	62.24
Republican	Kris Munn	6,277	37.76

Nevada State Assembly, Clark District 18 Primary Election, 2006
Party	Candidate	Votes	%
Democratic	Lon West Enwright	506	18.02
Democratic	Mark Manendo	2,302	81.98

Nevada State Assembly, Clark District 18 General Election, 2006
Party	Candidate	Votes	%
Independent American	Lou Epton	627	5.34
Republican	Ken Jarvis	3,341	28.47
Democratic	Mark Manendo	7,766	63.18

Nevada State Assembly, Clark District 18 Primary Election, 2008
Party	Candidate	Votes	%
Democratic	Lon West Enwright	283	14.24
Democratic	Mark Manendo	1,705	85.76

Nevada State Assembly, Clark District 18 General Election, 2008
Party	Candidate	Votes	%
Democratic	Mark Manendo	15,069	71.43
Republican	Tim Williams	6,028	28.57

Nevada State Senate, Clark District 7 Primary Election, 2010
Party	Candidate	Votes	%
Democratic	Mark Manendo	4,403	57.39
Democratic	Kathy McClain	3,269	42.61

Nevada State Senate, Clark District 7 General Election, 2010
Party	Candidate	Votes	%
Democratic	Mark Manendo	24,846	65.42
Republican	Anthony "Tony" Wright	13,131	34.58
