= Nevada's 14th Senate district =

American legislative district

Nevada's 14th State Senate district
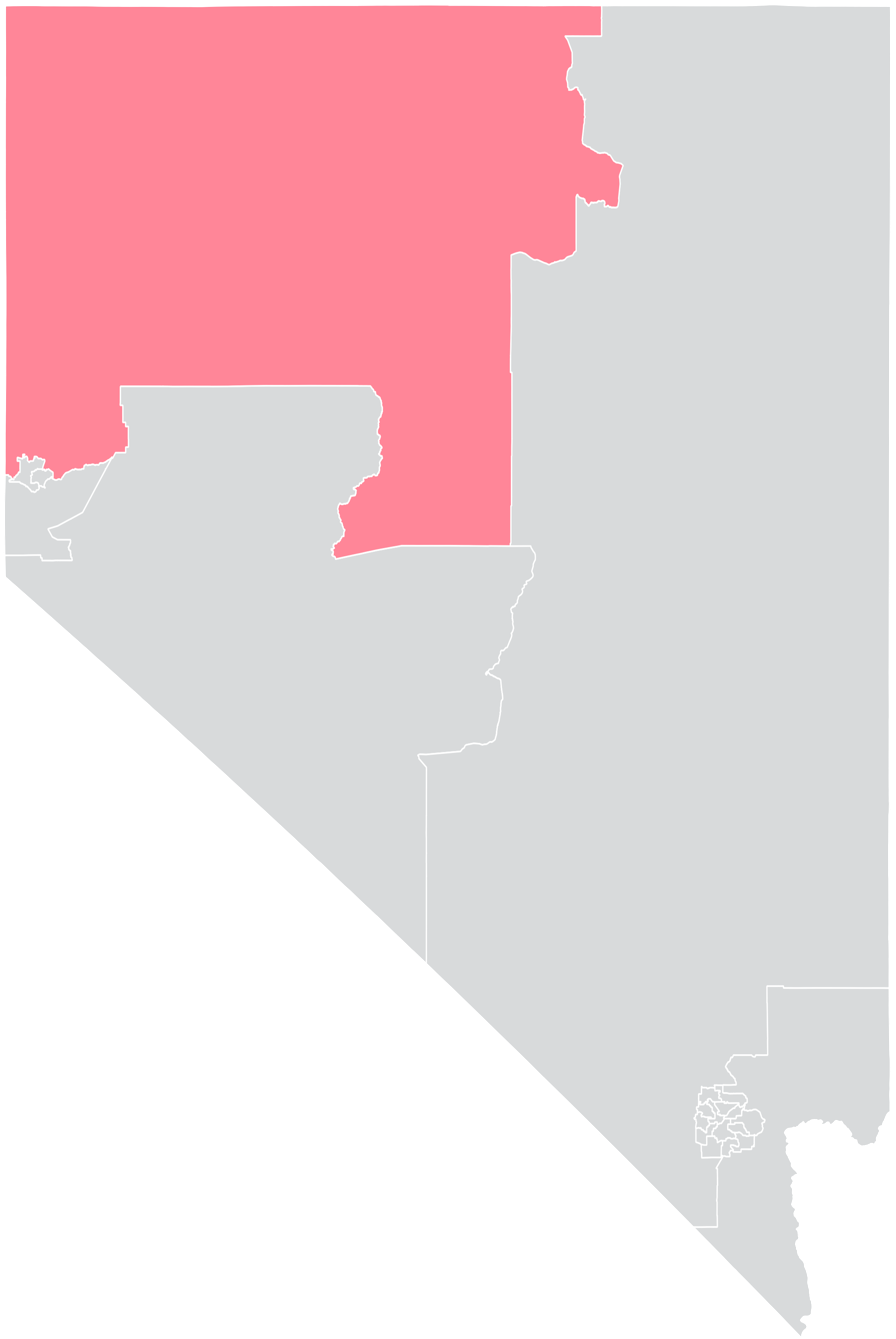
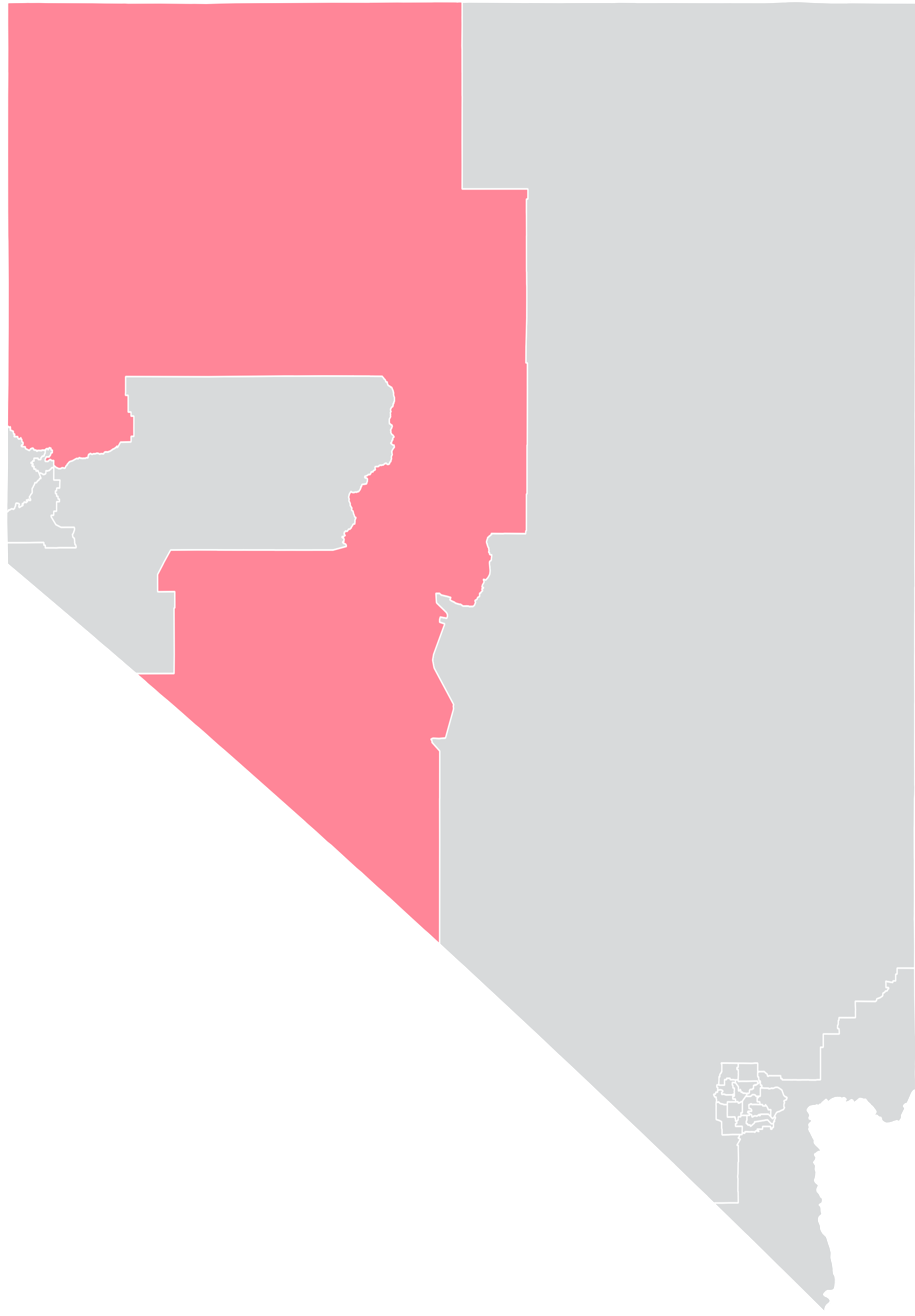
Senator
Ira Hansen; R–Sparks
- Registration: 44.4% Republican; 34.6% Democratic; 15.0% No party preference
- Demographics: 66% White; 2% Black; 23% Hispanic; 3% Asian; 3% Native American; 3% Other
- Population (2018): 138,504
- Registered voters: 70,941

Nevada's 14th Senate district is one of 21 districts in the Nevada Senate. It has been represented by Republican Ira Hansen since 2018, succeeding fellow Republican Don Gustavson.

== Geography ==
District 14 stretches from the suburbs of Reno in Washoe County to many of the state's rural areas in Esmeralda, Humboldt, Lander, Mineral, Nye, and Pershing Counties. Communities within the district include Winnemucca, Battle Mountain, Hawthorne, Lovelock, Tonopah, Goldfield, Spanish Springs, Golden Valley, Lemmon Valley, and parts of Sparks and Sun Valley. The district is also home to Black Rock City, home to the annual festival Burning Man.

The district overlaps with Nevada's 2nd and 4th congressional districts, and with the 31st and 32nd districts of the Nevada Assembly. It borders the states of California, Oregon, and – just barely – Idaho.

== Recent election results ==
Nevada Senators are elected to staggered four-year terms; since 2012 redistricting, the 14th district has held elections in midterm years.

=== 2022 ===
2022 Nevada State Senate election, District 14
Party	Candidate	Votes	%
Republican	Ira Hansen (incumbent)	47,925	100
Total votes		47,925	100
Republican hold			

== Historical election results ==
=== 2018 ===
2018 Nevada State Senate election, District 14
Party	Candidate	Votes	%
Republican	Ira Hansen	32,913	60.5
Democratic	Wendy Boszak	21,460	39.5
Total votes		54,373	100
Republican hold			

=== 2014 ===
2014 Nevada State Senate election, District 14
Primary election
Party	Candidate	Votes	%
Democratic	Joe Hunt	2,303	56.8
Democratic	K. C. Harrison	1,751	43.2
Total votes		4,054	100
General election
Republican	Don Gustavson (incumbent)	24,994	70.0
Democratic	Joe Hunt	10,690	30.0
Total votes		35,684	100
Republican hold			

=== Federal and statewide results ===
Year	Office	Results
2020	President	Trump 58.7 – 38.4%
2018	Senate	Heller 57.2 – 37.8%
2018	Governor	Laxalt 57.5 – 36.6%
2016	President	Trump 56.5 – 35.2%
2012	President	Romney 55.5 – 42.0%
2012	Senate	Heller 58.2 – 30.9%
