= Kathy Augustine =

American politician (1956–2006)

18th Nevada State Controller
- In office January 4, 1999 – July 11, 2006
- Governor: Kenny Guinn
- Preceded by: Darrel R. Daines
- Succeeded by: Steve Martin

Member of the Nevada Senate from the 7th district
- In office 1995–1999 Serving with Dina Titus
- Preceded by: Lori Lipman Brown
- Succeeded by: Terry John Care

Member of the Nevada Assembly from the 12th district
- In office 1993–1995
- Preceded by: John L. Norton
- Succeeded by: Genie Ohrenshall

Personal details
- Born: Kathy Marie Alfano; May 29, 1956 Los Angeles, California, U.S.
- Died: July 11, 2006 (aged 50) Reno, Nevada, U.S.
- Resting place: Davis Memorial Park, Las Vegas, Nevada
- Party: Republican
- Spouse(s): Gary Voss (m. 19??; div. 19??) Charles Augustine (m. 1986; died 2003) William Charles Higgs (m. 2003)
- Children: 1
- Education: Occidental College; California State University, Long Beach
- Profession: Politician

Kathy Marie Alfano Augustine (May 29, 1956 – July 11, 2006) was an American politician from Nevada. A Republican, Augustine served in the Nevada Assembly (1993–1995) and in the Nevada Senate (1995–1999). She was Nevada's first female State Controller, serving from 1999 until her 2006 death, except for a brief period of suspension during her 2004 impeachment trial which led to censure but not termination from office. She was murdered in 2006 by Chaz Higgs, her fourth husband, who was sentenced to life imprisonment with the possibility of parole.

== Early life ==
Augustine was born as Kathy Marie Alfano in Los Angeles, California, and was Italian-American. Her educational background included a bachelor's degree in political science from Occidental College, and a Master of Public Administration degree from California State University, Long Beach. While in college, she worked in Washington, D.C. as a Congressional intern. Prior to entering politics, Augustine worked for Delta Air Lines as a flight scheduler for twelve years, and briefly as a flight attendant, based out of Las Vegas, Nevada, after 1988.

For two years, Augustine was married to Gary Voss, a flight controller with whom she had her daughter Dallas. Following that, Augustine married Delta Air Lines pilot Charles Augustine. They were married for seventeen years until his death from complications of a stroke on August 19, 2003. She had three stepchildren from her marriage to Charles. Three weeks after his death, she married William Charles "Chaz" Higgs on September 19, 2003, a critical care nurse who had been involved in Charles Augustine's care.

== Political career ==
From 1993 to 1995, Augustine served one term in the Nevada Assembly. During the 1992 election campaign, she was criticized for a campaign advertisement featuring a bad photograph of her African-American opponent (the same photograph, however, was used by her opponent in her own campaign literature). Above descriptions of the two candidates' positions on various issues was a caption reading, "There is a real difference." Augustine served in the Nevada Senate from 1995 to 1999. In the 1994 state senate election, she defeated incumbent Lori Lipman Brown, and once again drew controversy for a campaign advertisement in which she accused Brown of being opposed to prayer and the Pledge of Allegiance. In fact, Brown, who is ethnically Jewish (though an atheist theologically), declined to participate in a prayer led by a Christian minister, and the accusation regarding Brown's opposition to the Pledge was false. In 1998, Augustine was elected as the state's first female State Controller, serving in that post until her death. In January 2004, George W. Bush administration officials advised Augustine that she was a finalist to become Treasurer of the United States; however, Anna Escobedo Cabral was subsequently nominated and confirmed as Treasurer.

== Impeachment and censure ==
In September 2004, Augustine was accused of violating state ethics laws during her 2002 re-election campaign for using state personnel and equipment for her personal re-election campaign. Following the investigation the Ethics Commission found that she committed a willful violation of the Nevada Ethics Law and Augustine was fined a record US$15,000 (equivalent to $25,600 in 2025) by the state Ethics Commission. The Ethics Commission referred the case to the Nevada Legislature where she was impeached by the Nevada Assembly in November of the same year, and temporarily relinquished office. She was the first Nevada state official to be impeached. Following a week-long trial in the Nevada Senate, she was convicted on one charge, but acquitted on three others. Augustine was censured, but allowed to resume office.

== 2006 State Treasurer race ==
Unable to seek a third term as State Controller due to term limits, in January 2006, in the last year of her term as State Controller, Augustine announced her candidacy for Nevada State Treasurer, despite opposition from state Republican Party leaders stemming from her impeachment. In May 2006, the party voted to deny her party support in the State Treasurer race. Despite her death, her name remained on the ballot for the August 15 primary, and she received 18.64% of the vote.

== Murder and subsequent death investigation ==
On July 8, 2006, Augustine was found unconscious in her Reno home, and died three days later without regaining consciousness. Following Augustine's death Governor Kenny Guinn appointed Steve Martin, an accountant and Republican candidate in the 2006 State Controller race, to succeed her.

Although early reports stated that the cause of death was a heart attack, police soon came to suspect foul play.

On July 14, 2006, her husband, nurse Chaz Higgs, attempted suicide by slitting his wrists in the couple's Las Vegas home. Higgs was arrested in Hampton, Virginia on September 29, 2006, and charged with first degree murder in Augustine's death after an FBI toxicology test found traces of the paralyzing drug succinylcholine in her system. Higgs, a critical care nurse, allegedly made suspicious remarks to a co-worker about how to kill someone undetectably using succinylcholine. He was extradited back to Nevada. The warrant and test results were kept secret until Higgs's arrest.

Higgs was convicted of murder by a Reno jury on June 29, 2007. He was sentenced to life in prison, with a chance of parole after 20 years. He was placed on suicide watch after twice trying to kill himself while in custody. Higgs is housed in the High Desert State Prison near Indian Springs, Nevada. In May 2009, the Nevada Supreme Court upheld Higgs's murder conviction in a majority decision.

Political offices
Preceded by Darrel R. Daines	Nevada State Controller; 1999–2006	Succeeded by Steve Martin
