= Terry John Care =

American politician

Member of the Nevada Senate from the Clark 7 (Dual Member District) district
- In office 1998–2010 Serving with Dina Titus (1998-2008); David Parks (2008-2010)
- Preceded by: Kathy Augustine
- Succeeded by: Mark Manendo

Personal details
- Born: January 12, 1947 (age 79)
- Party: Democratic

Terry John Care was a Democratic member of the Nevada Senate, representing Clark Country District 7 (map) from 1998 through 2010.
