= David Parks (politician) =

American politician

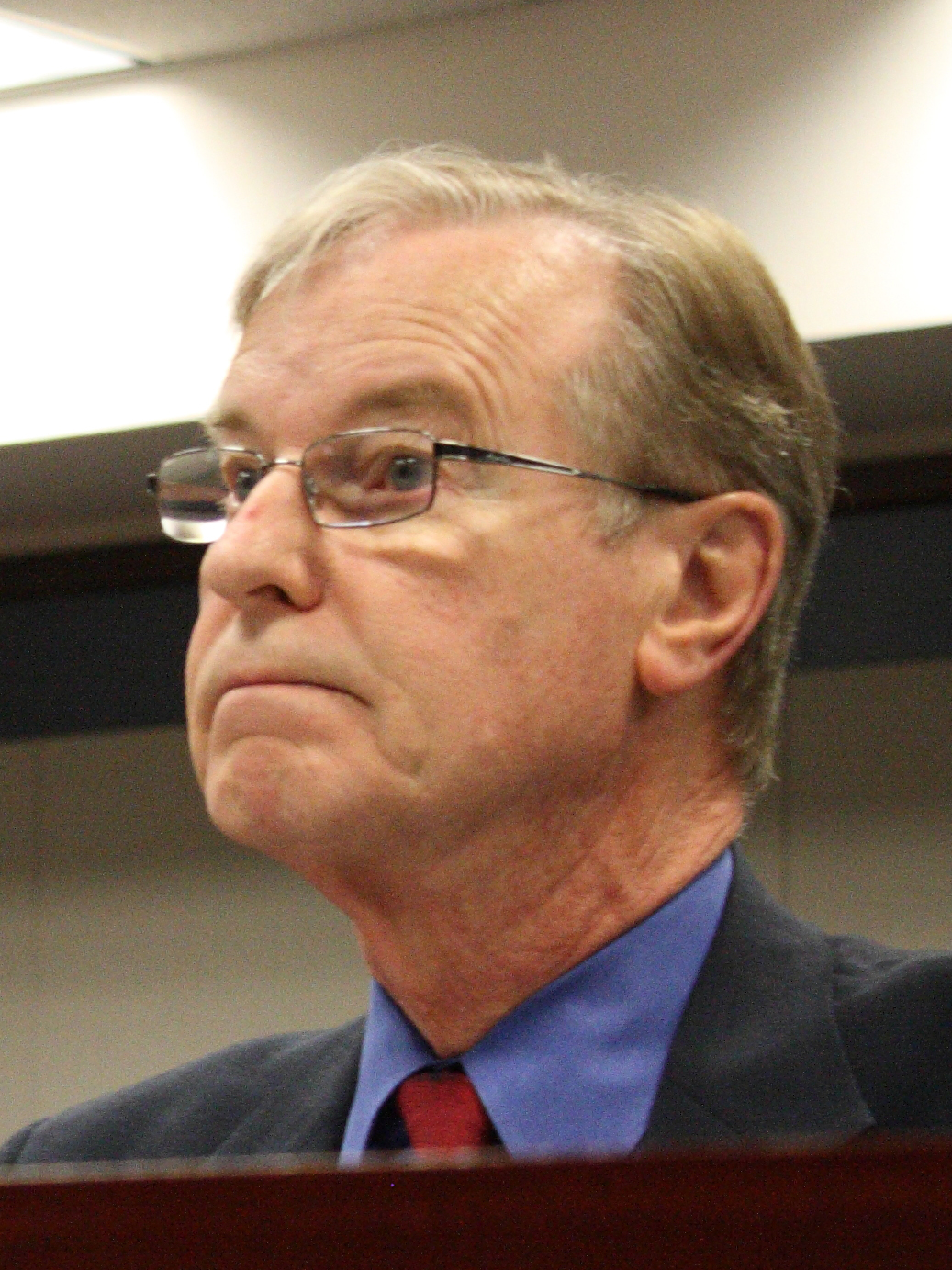
- Parks in 2011

Member of the Nevada Senate from the 7th district
- In office 2012–2020
- Preceded by: Dina Titus
- Succeeded by: Roberta Lange

Member of the Nevada Senate from the Clark 7th (Dual-Member District) district
- In office 2008–2012 Serving with Mark Manendo (2010-2012); Terry Care (2008-2010)
- Preceded by: Dina Titus

Member of the Nevada Assembly from the 41st district
- In office 1996–2008
- Preceded by: Larry Spitler
- Succeeded by: Paul Aizley

Personal details
- Born: December 22, 1943 (age 82) Boston, Massachusetts, U.S.
- Party: Democratic
- Education: University of New Hampshire; University of Nevada, Las Vegas

Military service
- Allegiance: United States of America
- Branch/service: United States Air Force
- Years of service: 1966–1971

David Parks (born December 22, 1943) is an American politician from Las Vegas, Nevada. A Democrat, he served in the Nevada Senate for 12 years, representing the state's 7th district in Clark County. He was elected to the Senate in November 2008, prior to which he had served in the Nevada Assembly since 1996. He was term-limited in 2020 and did not run for re-election.

== Early life and career ==
Educated at the University of New Hampshire, Parks served in the United States Air Force between 1967 and 1971, and was stationed at Nellis Air Force Base in Las Vegas. He then earned an MBA at the University of Nevada, Las Vegas.

== Political offices ==
A former assistant director of Clark County's Regional Transportation Commission, he was first appointed to the Paradise Town Advisory Board in 1991 and served three terms. He was elected the board's chairman in 1992 and served in that role until his election to the State Assembly in November 1996. He was re-elected comfortably in 1998 and 2000.

In 2002, longtime Republican opponent Tony Dane (who Parks defeated in 1996 and 1998) convinced a man also called David Parks to run against him for the Democratic nomination in the 41st Assembly district. Challenger Parks' name was removed from the ballot when it became apparent that he was not a resident of Clark County, nor indeed of Nevada. Incumbent Parks won the general election and was re-elected again in 2004 and 2006.

He was not a candidate for re-election to the Assembly in 2008 but instead ran for the Nevada Senate in the 7th district, seeking to succeed Dina Titus who mounted a successful bid for Congress. Three Democrats and three Republicans filed for the seat. In the primary election held on August 12, 2008, he faced a well-funded opponent but prevailed easily, winning 71 percent of the vote in a three-way race. He faced Republican Lindsay Nicole Madsen in the November general election, winning easily; he garnered 68% of the vote to her 32%.

In 2010, he ran to succeed Rory Reid on the Clark County Commission, losing the Democratic primary election to Mary Beth Scow by just 91 votes.

He was appointed to the Governor's Statewide AIDS Advisory Task Force in 1987 (serving until 1994) and again in 2002 (still serving).

=== Electoral history ===
David Parks was elected in 1996 to serve in the Nevada State Assembly in Clark District 41.

Nevada State Assembly, Clark District 41 General Election, 1998
Party	Candidate	Votes	%
Democratic	David Parks	1,886	63.95
Republican	Phillip Dane	1,063	36.05

Nevada State Assembly, Clark District 41 General Election, 2000
Party	Candidate	Votes	%
Democratic	David Parks	2,593	65.33
Republican	John Richie	1,376	34.67

Nevada State Assembly, Clark District 41 General Election, 2002
Party	Candidate	Votes	%
Democratic	David Parks	3,949	53.72
Republican	Philip Dane	2,800	38.09
Independent American	Patricia Saye	602	8.19

Nevada State Assembly, Clark District 41 General Election, 2004
Party	Candidate	Votes	%
Democratic	David Parks	7,400	59.12
Republican	Patricia Saye	4,386	35.04
Independent American	Christopher Hansen	731	5.84

Nevada State Assembly, Clark District 41 General Election, 2006
Party	Candidate	Votes	%
Democratic	David Parks	4,542	59.89
Republican	Bob Wong	2,681	35.35
Independent American	Brad Lee Barnhill	361	4.76

Nevada State Senate, Clark District 7 Primary Election, 2008
Party	Candidate	Votes	%
Democratic	David Parks	3,762	71.44
Democratic	Brandon Casutt	679	12.89
Democratic	Steve Nathan	825	15.67

Nevada State Senate, Clark District 7 General Election, 2008
Party	Candidate	Votes	%
Democratic	David Parks	38,200	68.06
Republican	Lindsay Nicole Madsen	17,926	31.94

Clark County Commission, District G Primary Election, 2010
Party	Candidate	Votes	%
Democratic	Michael Dicks	371	4.16
Democratic	Greg Esposito	2,128	23.87
Democratic	Ron Newell	499	5.60
Democratic	David Parks	2,913	32.68
Democratic	Mary Beth Scow	3,004	33.70

Nevada State Senate, Clark District 7 General Election, 2012
Party	Candidate	Votes	%
Democratic	David Parks	25,567	64.15
Republican	Trish Marsh	14,285	35.85

Nevada State Senate, Clark District 7 General Election, 2016
Party	Candidate	Votes	%
Democratic	David Parks	28,431	69.5
Libertarian	Kimberly Schjang	12,454	30.5

== Personal ==
He is openly gay and was the first openly gay member of the Nevada Legislature. He is one of five openly LGBT members of the Nevada legislature, alongside Senators Pat Spearman and Kelvin Atkinson, as well as Assemblymen Andrew Martin and James Healey. His election campaigns have won the support of the Gay & Lesbian Victory Fund.
