= Nevada's 7th Senate district =

American legislative district

Coordinates: 36.09°N 115.07°W

Nevada's 7th State Senate district
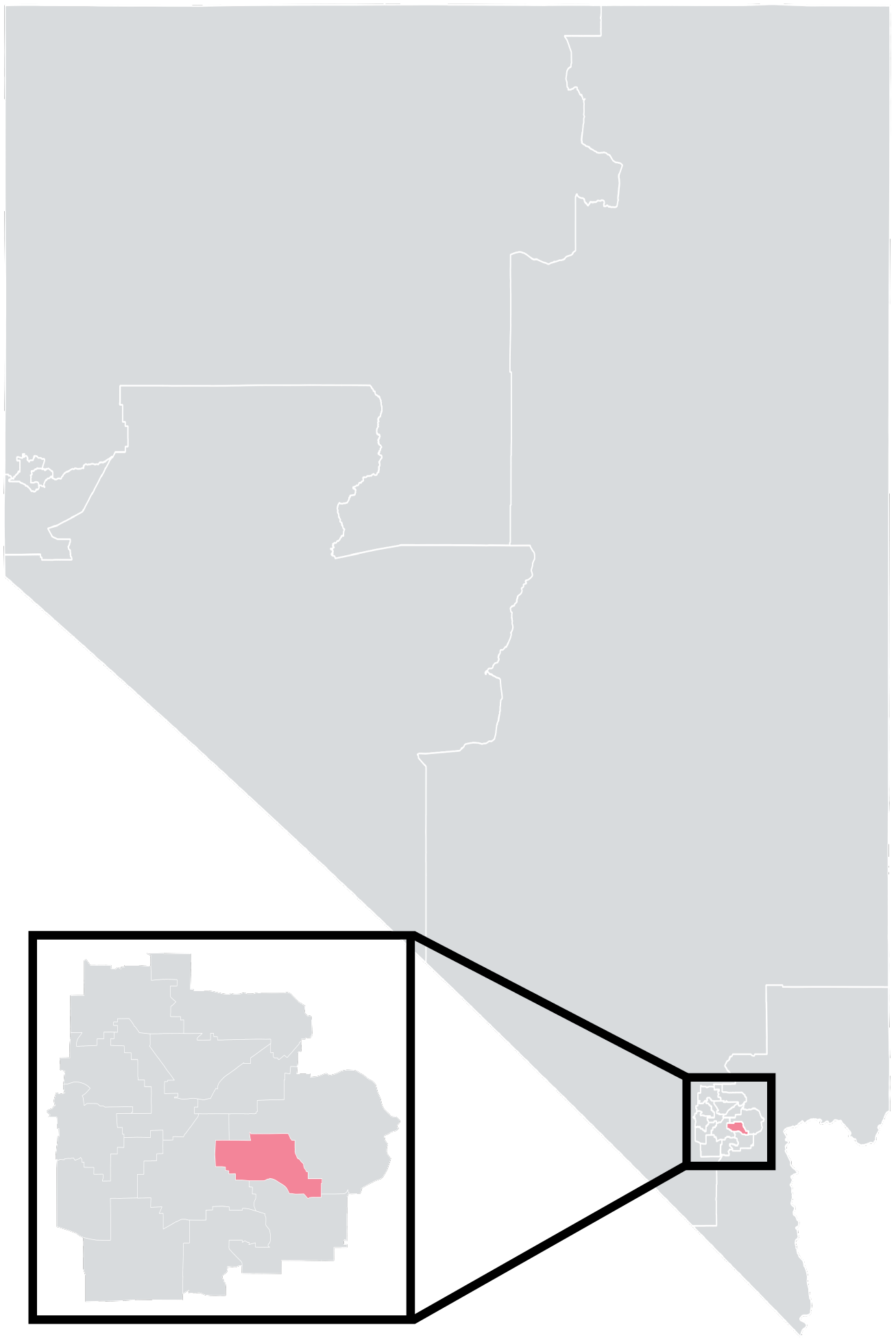
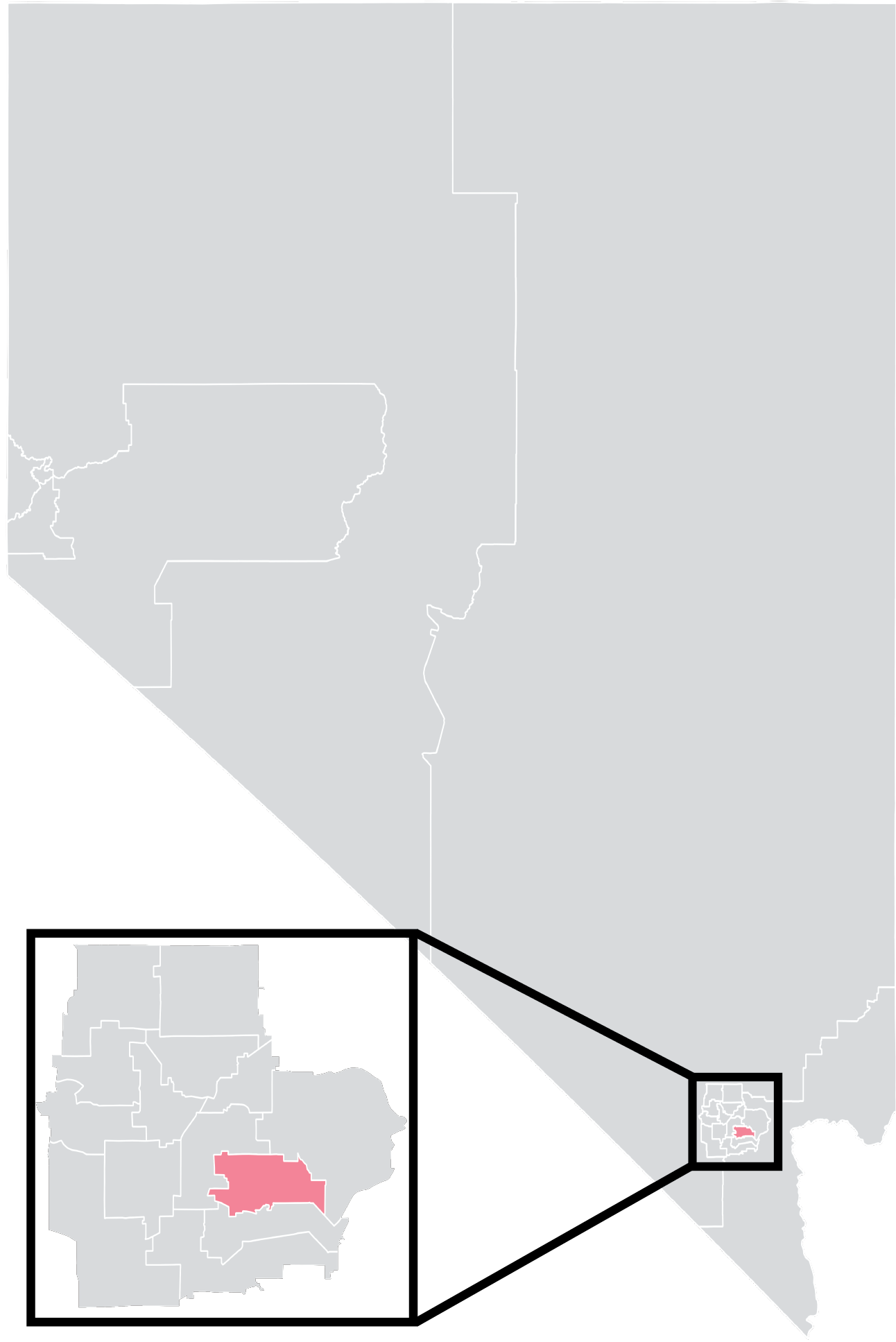
Senator
Roberta Lange; D–Henderson
- Registration: 48.8% Democratic; 27.8% Republican; 17.2% No party preference
- Demographics: 40% White; 9% Black; 37% Hispanic; 8% Asian; 1% Native American; 5% Other
- Population (2018): 137,292
- Registered voters: 64,320

Nevada's 7th Senate district is one of 21 districts in the Nevada Senate. It has been represented by Democrat Roberta Lange since 2020, succeeding term-limited fellow Democrat David Parks.

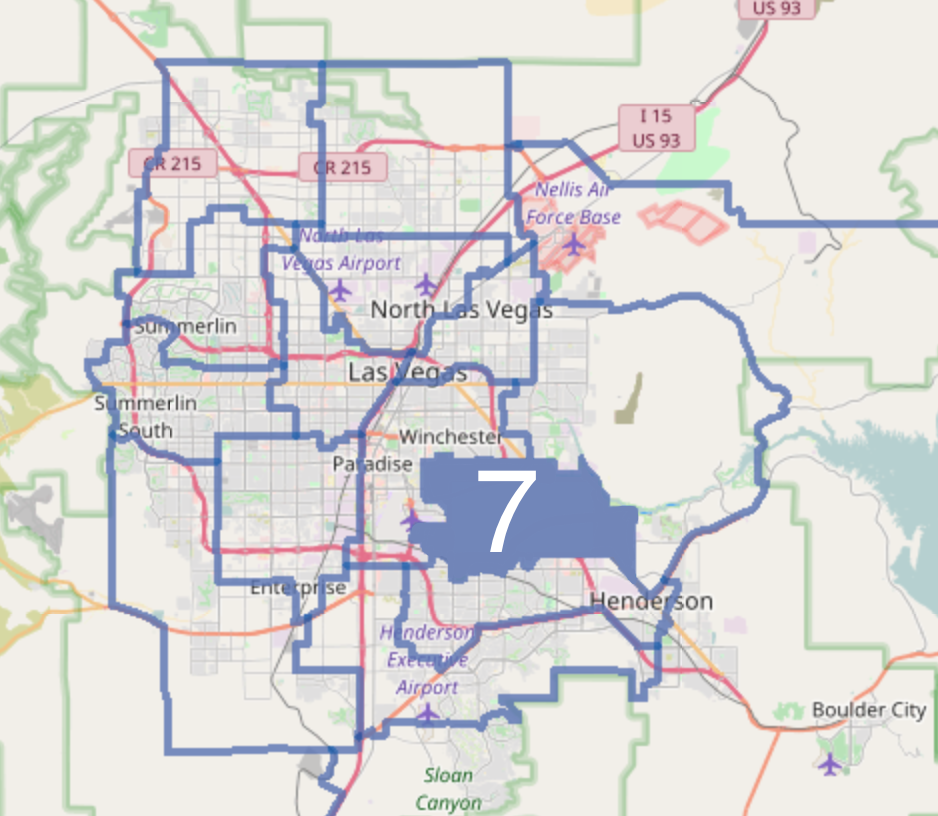
Closeup on the Las Vegas Valley with District 7 colored blue

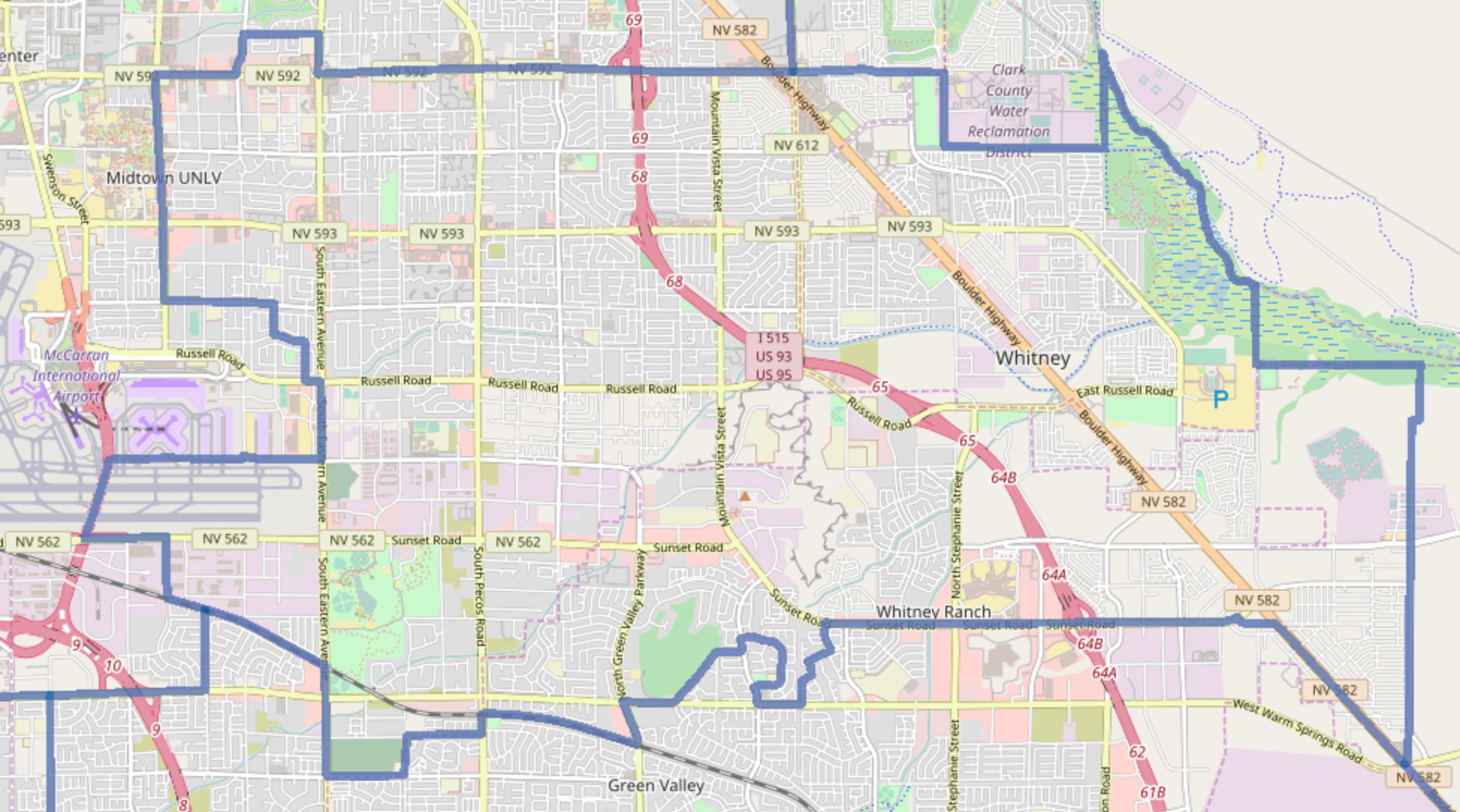
Closeup map of District 7

== Geography and demographics ==
District 3 is based in the Las Vegas Valley in Clark County, including most of Whitney, parts of Paradise and Henderson, and the southern tip of Sunrise Manor.

The district overlaps with Nevada's 1st and 3rd congressional districts, and with the 18th and 20th districts of the Nevada Assembly. It has a surface area of 27 square miles (70 km^{2}), and a perimeter of 31.5 miles (50.7 km).

According to the 2010 Census, the 7th district had a population of 128,598, which was the ideal population for a senatorial district. Compared to the Nevada average, the district has a relatively low solely white population and a relatively high proportion of Hispanics and Latinos. The district has a comparatively young population, with 34% of residents between the ages of 18 and 39, and a lower education rate than the state average. The district's median household income is $46,000, which is almost $7,000 below the state median. The poverty rate of 15%, however, is the same as in the rest of the state.

== Recent election results ==
Nevada Senators are elected to staggered four-year terms; since 2012 redistricting, the 7th district has held elections in presidential years.

=== 2024 ===
2024 Nevada State Senate election, District 7
Party	Candidate	Votes	%
Democratic	Roberta Lange (incumbent)	29,581	58.38
Republican	Leonel Henderson Jr	21,093	41.62
Total votes		50,674	100
Democratic hold			

=== 2020 ===
2020 Nevada State Senate election, District 7
Primary election
Party	Candidate	Votes	%
Democratic	Roberta Lange	3,672	38.3
Democratic	Ellen Spiegel	3,540	36.9
Democratic	Richard Carrillo	2,384	24.8
Total votes		9,596	100
General election
Democratic	Roberta Lange	39,036	100
Total votes		39,036	100
Democratic hold			

=== 2016 ===
In the 2016 Democratic primary election, incumbent David Parks faced Anthony Wernicke, an Army veteran, bus driver, and perennial candidate who had previously run for State Assembly, State Senate, and Mayor of Las Vegas. Parks, handily defeated Wernicke with over 75% of the vote. Parks' general election opponent was Libertarian Kimberly Schjang, who contrasted her opposition to tax increases with Parks' yes vote on a $1.5 billion public education funding bill. Parks defeated Schjang with nearly 70% of the vote.

2016 Nevada State Senate election, District 7
Party	Candidate	Votes	%
Democratic	David Parks (incumbent)	3,222	77.2
Democratic	Anthony Wernicke	950	22.8
Total votes		4,172	100
General election
Democratic	David Parks (incumbent)	28,431	69.5
Libertarian	Kimberly Schjang	12,454	30.5
Total votes		40,885	100
Democratic hold			

=== 2012 ===
In 2012, incumbent Democrat David Parks, who had served for 16 years in the legislature, faced Republican Trish Marsh. Parks, who is openly gay, focused on his record fighting for LGBT rights, including a domestic partnership law he authored, as well as repealing needless tax exemptions and lowering the sales tax. Marsh, a salesperson and political newcomer, argued that Parks focused too much on LGBT rights and should prioritize other issues, such as lowering taxes and merging local and state departments. Parks, who was endorsed by the Las Vegas Review-Journal and out-raised Marsh $100,000 to $2,000, won the election with 64% of the vote.

2012 Nevada State Senate election, District 7
Party	Candidate	Votes	%
Democratic	David Parks (incumbent)	25,567	64.2
Republican	Trish Marsh	14,285	35.8
Total votes		39,852	100
Democratic hold			

=== Federal and statewide results ===
Year	Office	Results
2020	President	Biden 58.6 – 39.0%
2018	Senate	Rosen 60.7 – 34.5%
2018	Governor	Sisolak 59.3 – 34.7%
2016	President	Clinton 57.1 – 36.4%
2012	President	Obama 62.5 – 35.4%
2012	Senate	Berkley 54.5 – 34.8%

== History ==
The present 7th district was drawn during the reapportionment of the districts in 2011 after the 2010 Census. The newly drawn districts became effective for filing for office, and for nominating and electing senators on January 1, 2012, and for all other purposes on November 7 – the day after Election Day, when the new senator terms began. The area of District 7 is defined in the Nevada Revised Statutes using census tracts, block groups, and blocks.
