= Patricia Farley =

American politician (born 1974)

Member of the Nevada Senate from the 8th district
- In office 2014–2018
- Preceded by: Barbara Cegavske
- Succeeded by: Marilyn Dondero Loop

Personal details
- Born: June 1974 (age 52) Mesa, Arizona
- Party: Republican (until 2016); Nonpartisan (since 2016)
- Education: University of Arizona

Patricia Farley (born June 1974) is a former member of the Nevada Senate, representing the 8th district from 2014 until 2018. She was first elected to the chamber as a Republican, but switched her partisan registration to Nonpartisan in 2016.

== Early life and career ==
Farley announced shortly after the November 2016 general election that she would change her party affiliation from Republican to nonpartisan with the intention of caucusing with Democrats.

=== Electoral history ===
Farley was first elected in 2014, defeating Democrat Marilyn Dondero Loop and Independent Jon Kamerath with Farley receiving 57% of the votes.
