= Marilyn Dondero Loop =

American politician (born 1951)

President pro tempore of the Nevada Senate
- Incumbent
- Assumed office February 3, 2025
- Preceded by: Pat Spearman

Member of the Nevada Senate from the 8th district
- Incumbent
- Assumed office November 7, 2018
- Preceded by: Patricia Farley

Member of the Nevada Assembly from the 5th district
- In office November 4, 2008 – November 4, 2014
- Preceded by: Valerie Weber
- Succeeded by: Erv Nelson

Personal details
- Born: 1951 (age 74–75) Las Vegas, Nevada, U.S.
- Party: Democratic
- Education: University of Nevada, Las Vegas (BS, MEd)

Marilyn Dondero Loop (born 1951, in Las Vegas, Nevada) is an American politician and a Democratic member of the Nevada Senate since November 2018, representing District 8. She was previously a member of the Nevada Assembly from 2008 to 2014, representing District 5.

== Education ==
Dondero Loop earned her BS in elementary education and her MEd in curriculum and instruction from University of Nevada, Las Vegas.

== Elections ==
- 2008 – When Republican Assemblywoman Valerie Weber left the Assembly and left the District 5 seat open, Dondero Loop was unopposed for the August 12, 2008 Democratic Primary and won the three-way November 4, 2008 General election with 9,332 votes (51.40%) against Republican nominee Donna Toussaint and Independent candidate Don Woolbright.
- 2010 – Dondero Loop was unopposed for the June 8, 2010 Democratic Primary and won the November 2, 2010 General election with 7,271 votes (54.09%) against Republican nominee Tim Williams, who had run for an Assembly seat in 2008.
- 2012 – Dondero Loop was unopposed for the June 12, 2012 Democratic Primary and won the three-way November 6, 2012 General election with 12,200 votes (51.31%) against former Republican Assemblyman Bill Harrington and Independent American candidate Jason Reeves.

== Electoral history ==
Nevada's 5th assembly district 2008 General Election
Party	Candidate	Votes	%
Democratic	Marilyn Dondero	9,332	51.40
Republican	Donna Toussaint	7,295	40.18
Independent American	Don Woolbright	1,527	8.41

Nevada's 5th assembly district 2010 General Election
Party	Candidate	Votes	%
Democratic	Marilyn Dondero	7,271	54.09
Republican	Tim Williams	6,172	45.91

Nevada's 5th assembly district 2012 General Election
Party	Candidate	Votes	%
Democratic	Marilyn Dondero	12,200	51.31
Republican	Bill Harrington	10,705	45.02
Independent American	Jason Reeves	872	3.67

Nevada's 8th Senate District 2018 Primary Election
Party	Candidate	Votes	%
Democratic	Marilyn Dondero	4,590	65.68
Democratic	Stephanie Alvarado	2,398	34.32

Nevada's 8th Senate District 2018 General Election
Party	Candidate	Votes	%
Democratic	Marilyn Dondero	25,777	51.63
Republican	Valerie Weber	24,154	48.37

Nevada Senate
Preceded by Pat Spearman	President pro tempore of the Nevada Senate; 2025–present	Incumbent
