= Ira Hansen =

American politician

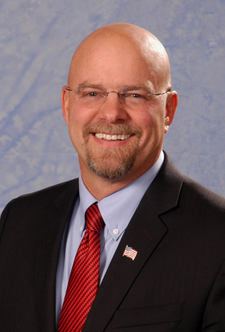

Member of the Nevada Senate from the 14th district
- Incumbent
- Assumed office November 7, 2018
- Preceded by: Don Gustavson

Member of the Nevada Assembly from the 32nd district
- In office November 3, 2010 – November 7, 2018
- Preceded by: Don Gustavson
- Succeeded by: Alexis Hansen

Personal details
- Born: October 5, 1960 (age 66) Reno, Nevada, U.S.
- Party: Republican
- Spouse: Alexis Lloyd
- Children: 8

Ira Hansen (born October 5, 1960) is an American politician and member of the Republican Party who has been a member of the Nevada State Senate for the 14th district since 2018. He formerly represented the Nevada Assembly's 32nd district from 2010 to 2018, and he was the Republican Party's nominee for Speaker of the Nevada Assembly in 2014.

== Biography ==
Hansen was born in Reno, Nevada and attended local Washoe County schools. While attending Sparks High School Ira met his future wife, Alexis Lloyd. As of 2014 they have been married for 34 years and have 8 children. Hansen started a plumbing company in 1986 at the age of 26. He is a member of the Church of Jesus Christ of Latter-day Saints. He has worked as a Sparks Little League coach, a Sparks Pop Warner coach and as a Scoutmaster for the Boy Scouts of America. He is a third generation Eagle Scout and all of his four sons are Eagle Scouts.

Hansen was an opinion columnist for the Sparks Tribune and was previously a talk radio host on station KKOH in Reno for five years and later for 99.1 KKFT.

Hansen is a lifetime member of Nevada Bighorns Unlimited, the NRA and other sportsmen and gun rights groups. His website states that he believes in "constitutionally limited government, lower taxes, and individual responsibility". He has been a proponent of states rights and has opposed what he believes is overreach by the Bureau of Land Management and other federal agencies. Hansen has called for a reform to Nevada's construction defect laws which he believes hurt the Nevada construction industry and are only benefiting attorneys who "have boasted that they have grossed over a billion dollars in construction defect claims." Hansen has expressed support for the mining industry and says on his website that "mining is the bedrock of Nevada's rural economy even today". He is a member of the Nevada Renewable Energy Coalition and supports using renewable energy sources to create jobs.

Hansen's aunt, Janine Hansen, is a perennial candidate under the conservative Independent American Party of Nevada. Hansen, who has stated that his aunt's efforts damage the Republican Party, has been reported to leave committee hearings when she gives testimony.

== Legislative Record ==
Hansen currently serves as the Chairman of the Nevada Assembly's Judiciary Committee. In 2011, Hansen authorized AB217, which repealed restrictions on some firearm sales. AB217 passed unanimously and was signed by Governor Brian Sandoval. In 2015, Hansen sponsored legislation that allowed firearms to be carried and stored in family foster homes in certain circumstances (AB167).

Hansen supports the transfer of Nevada land from the federal government to the state government. In 2013, Hansen passed AB227, which created the Nevada Land Management Task Force with the goal of studying the transfer of federal land back to Nevada. Using the findings of the study, Hansen sponsored and passed SRJ1 and SRJ2 in 2015, which first urged the United States Congress to transfer the title of some public lands to the state of Nevada and second required the federal government to share receipts from commercial activity on the land which the state and the counties in which the activities were performed.

=== Ratings and Endorsements ===
Hansen has been endorsed by the National Federation of Independent Business in 2016 and 2015.

Hansen received a 100% rating from the NRA Political Victory Fund after they endorsed him in 2012 and gave him an "A" rating in 2011.

=== Assembly speaker designate ===
On November 7, 2014, Nevada Assembly Republicans named Hansen as their candidate for the chamber's next Speaker.

Following the announcement, the News Review's Dennis Myers conducted an extensive search of an estimated 800 columns Hansen wrote for the Sparks Tribune from 1994 through 2010, almost all of which were only available on microfilm. In his columns, Hansen has written that the Oklahoma City bombing was a false flag operation orchestrated by the administration of President Clinton, that women do not belong in the United States Armed Forces, that President Obama is a "negro", that he owns and flies a Confederate battle flag, that gays are disproportionately prone to engaging in child abuse, that a "grossly disproportionate" number of crimes are committed by Latinos, and that the relationship between "Negroes and Democrats" is that of a "master-slave relationship with the benevolent master knowing what’s best for his simple minded darkies."

Hansen's comments drew national attention. He apologized on November 20, saying that it was "unfortunate" that his comments had been "taken out of context" and "portrayed as intentionally hurtful and disrespectful", saying that "these comments made nearly 20 years ago" as an opinion columnist were "meant to be purposely provocative in various political, cultural and religious views."

Hansen wrote an open letter on the press page of his website, saying "I freely admit my choice of words was at times very poor. As a columnist, I was encouraged to write provocatively but over the last 20 years I have learned that there is a line between being provocative and being offensive. There were times when I crossed that line. My intention was not to offend, and for any offense I have caused I again sincerely apologize." He also responded to specific things he had said. He further said that "this has been a carefully orchestrated attack to remove a conservative Republican from a major leadership role in State government. The deliberate character assassination and the politics of personal destruction have totally distorted my views and record."
