= James Ohrenschall =

American politician (born 1972)

Member of the Nevada Senate from the 21st district
- Incumbent
- Assumed office November 7, 2018
- Preceded by: Mark Manendo

Member of the Nevada Assembly from the 12th district
- In office November 8, 2006 – November 7, 2018
- Preceded by: Genie Ohrenschall
- Succeeded by: Susie Martinez

Personal details
- Born: 1972 (age 53–54) Las Vegas, Nevada
- Party: Democratic
- Education: College of Southern Nevada; University of Nevada, Las Vegas; William S. Boyd School of Law
- Profession: Lawyer

James Ohrenschall (born in October 1972 in Las Vegas, Nevada) is an American politician and a Democratic member of the Nevada Senate since November 7, 2018 representing District 21, succeeding Mark Manendo. He previously served in the Nevada Assembly from 2006-2018 representing District 12; he succeeded his mother, Eugenia 'Genie' Ohrenschall, who held the seat from 1994 until 2006.

== Education ==
Ohrenschall attended the College of Southern Nevada, earned his BA from the University of Nevada, Las Vegas, and his JD from its William S. Boyd School of Law.

== Elections ==
- 2006—When Democratic Assemblywoman Genie Ohrenschall retired and left the District 12 seat open, Ohrenschall won the August 15, 2006 Democratic Primary with 1,831 votes (75.01%), and won the November 7, 2006 General election with 5,314 votes (70.55%) against Republican nominee Lee Haynes, who had run for an Assembly seat in 2004.
- 2008—Ohrenschall won the August 12, 2008 Democratic Primary with 1,060 votes (78.58%), and won the November 4, 2008 General election with 9,680 votes (74.59%) against Republican nominee Dallas Augustine.
- 2010—Ohrenschall was unopposed for the June 8, 2010 Democratic Primary and won the November 2, 2010 General election with 6,843 votes (73.02%) against Republican nominee Tod Oppenborn.
- 2012—Ohrenschall won the June 12, 2012 Democratic Primary with 1,229 votes (76.96%), and won the November 6, 2012 General election with 13,274 votes (59.52%) against Republican nominee Bridgette Bryant.
- 2014—Ohrenschall won re-election.
- 2016 - Ohrenschall won the November 8, 2016 General election with 13,942 votes (54.9%) against Republican nominee Mark Riggins and Libertarian nominee Troy Warren.
