= Richard Carrillo =

American politician (born 1967)

Member of the Nevada Assembly from the 18th district
- In office February 7, 2011 – November 4, 2020
- Preceded by: Mark Manendo
- Succeeded by: Venicia Considine

Personal details
- Born: 1967 (age 58–59) Belen, New Mexico
- Party: Democratic
- Website: richardcarrillo.com

Richard Carrillo (born 1967) is an American politician and was a Democratic member of the Nevada Assembly who served from February 7, 2011 to November 4, 2020 representing District 18. Carrillo is a member of the National Hispanic Caucus of State Legislators.

== Elections ==
- 2014 - Having one person file against Carrillo in March 2014, this race went to the General election. His opponent Amy Beaulieu whose only endorsement was from a well funded group called Everytown for Gun Safety (formerly Mayors Against Illegal Guns)had many paid walkers going through Assembly District 18 door to door campaigning against Carrillo.
- 2012 - Carrillo was unopposed for both the June 12, 2012 Democratic Primary and the November 6, 2012 General election, winning with 15,666 votes.
- 2010 - Due to term limits Assembly District 18 seat was open, Carrillo won the three-way race against Venecia Considine (Assembly Democratic Caucus Endorsed Candidate) and Lon West (A Political Hero)June 8, 2010 Democratic Primary with 1,639 votes (53.54%), and won the November 2, 2010 General election with 9,291 votes (61.39%) against Republican nominee Ken Walther.
