= John Marvel =

American politician (1926–2013)

John Marvel (September 11, 1926 – March 16, 2013) was an American rancher and politician.

Born in Battle Mountain, Nevada, Marvel served in the United States Army during World War II. Marvel was a cattle rancher. He graduated from University of Nevada, Reno. Marvel served in the Nevada Assembly from 1978 to 2008 as a Republican. He died in Carson City, Nevada.
