= Diversity in the Nevada Legislature =

== African-American legislators ==
The Nevada Legislature has included 29 self-identified African-Americans, the first being elected in 1966. There are ten African-American legislators serving as of the 2020 special sessions, including Speaker Jason Frierson.

Legislator	Party	District/Area Represented	Assembly Term	Senate Term	Notes
Woodrow Wilson	Republican	Clark No. 4	1966-1972	-	Later served on the Clark County Commission
Marion D. Bennett	Democratic	Clark No. 6	1972-1982	-	
Cranford L. Crawford Jr.	Democratic	Clark No. 7	1972-1974	-	
Joe Neal	Democratic	Clark No. 4	-	1972-2004	First African American elected to the Senate; Retired; Term Limited
Lonnie Chaney	Democratic	Clark No. 7	1974-1984	-	
Eugene Collins	Democratic	Clark No. 6	1982-1986	-	Changed party affiliation on August 27, 1965
Morse Arberry Jr.	Democratic	Clark No. 7	1984-2010	-	Retired; Term Limited
Thomas Batten	Republican	Washoe No. 27	1994-1996	-	
Bernice Mathews	Democratic	Washoe No. 1	-	1994-2010	First African American woman elected to the Senate; Retired; Term Limited
Maurice Washington	Republican	Washoe No. 2	-	1994-2010	Retired; Term Limited
Wendell Williams	Democratic	Clark No. 6	1986-2004	-	Retired; Term Limited
Kelvin Atkinson	Democratic	Clark No. 17 (Assembly); District No. 4 (Senate)	2002-2012	2012-2019	First African American elected to serve in both Houses of the Legislature; Served as Senate Majority Leader in 2019; First openly LGBT Senate Majority Leader in Nevada; Resigned after being charged with campaign finance felony
William Horne	Democratic	Clark No. 34	2002-2014	-	Retired; Term Limited
Harvey Munford	Democratic	Clark No. 6	2004-2016	-	Retired; Term Limited
Steven Horsford	Democratic	Clark No. 4	-	2004-2012	First African-American Senate Majority Leader; Ran for Nevada's 4th congressional district in 2012 and won; lost re-election in 2014 and then regained the seat in 2016
Steven Brooks	Democratic	District No. 17	2010-2013	-	Expelled from the Assembly on March 28, 2013 for crimes committed while in office
Jason Frierson	Democratic	District No. 8	2010-2014, 2016-	-	Speaker of the Assembly since 2017 (first African-American to serve as Speaker of the Nevada Assembly)
Dina Neal	Democratic	District No. 7	2010-	-	Daughter of Senator Joe Neal; First African American woman elected to the Assembly
Patricia Spearman	Democratic	District No. 1	-	2012-	First openly gay woman in the Senate; First openly gay person of color in the Legislature
Aaron D. Ford	Democratic	District No. 11	-	2012-2018	Senate Majority Leader from 2014-2018; Ran for Nevada Attorney General in 2018 and won
Tyrone Thompson	Democratic	District No. 1	2013-2019	-	Appointed in 2013 to replace Steven Brooks; Died in office
William McCurdy II	Democratic	District No. 6	2016-	-	
Brittney Miller	Democratic	District No. 5	2016-	-	
Daniele Monroe-Moreno	Democratic	District No. 1	2016-	-	
Alexander Assefa	Democratic	District No. 42	2018-	-	First African-born person in the Legislature
Howard Watts III	Democratic	District No. 15	2018-	-	
Dallas Harris	Democratic	District No. 11	-	2018-	
Marcia Washington	Democratic	District No. 4	-	2019-	
Kasina Douglass-Boone	Democratic	District No. 17	2020-	-	

== Hispanic/Latino legislators ==
The Nevada Legislature has included 22 self-identified Hispanic/Latino legislators, the first being elected in 1874 with 70 years until the next Hispanic legislator was elected. There are ten Latino legislators currently serving as of the 2020 special sessions.

Legislator	Party	District/Area Represented	Assembly Term	Senate Term	Notes
Pablo Laveaga	Democratic	Humboldt County	1874-1878	-	
William Martinez	Democratic	White Pine County	1944-1948	-	Served as Speaker Pro Tempore in 1945
Bob Coffin	Democratic	Clark No. 9 (Assembly); Clark No. 3 (Senate)	1982-1986	1986-2010	First Hispanic to serve in both houses of the Legislature; Term Limited in 2010; Successfully ran for Las Vegas City Council
Brian Sandoval	Republican	Washoe No. 25	1994-1998	-	Ran for Governor of Nevada in 2010 and won and later won re-election in 2014
John Oceguera	Democratic	Clark No. 16	2000-2012	-	Served as Speaker of the Assembly in 2011; Ran for Nevada's 3rd congressional district in 2012 and lost
Mo Denis	Democratic	District No. 28 (Assembly); District No. 2 (Senate)	2004-2010	2010-	Served as Senate Majority Leader in 2013 (first Latino Majority Leader in Nevada)
Ruben Kihuen	Democratic	District No. 11 (Assembly); District No. 10 (Senate)	2006-2010	2010-2016	Ran for Nevada's 4th congressional district in 2016 and won Resigned from Congress due to sexual harassment committed during Nevada legislative career
Irene Bustamante Adams	Democratic	District No. 42	2010-2018	-	
Lucy Flores	Democratic	District No. 28	2010-2014	-	Ran for Lieutenant Governor of Nevada in 2014 and lost
Olivia Diaz	Democratic	District No. 11	2010-2018	-	Ran for Las Vegas City Council in 2019 and won.
Teresa Benitez-Thompson	Democratic	District No. 27	2010-	-	
Richard Carrillo	Democratic	District No. 18	2010-	-	
Steven Brooks	Democratic	District No. 19	2010-2013	-	Expelled from the Assembly on March 28, 2013 for crimes committed while in office
Edgar Flores	Democratic	District No. 28	2014-	-	
Nelson Araujo	Democratic	District No. 3	2014-2018	-	Ran for Secretary of State of Nevada in 2018 and lost
Victoria Seaman	Republican	District No. 34	2014-2016	-	Ran for re-election and lost Ran for Las Vegas City Council in 2019 and won
Sandra Jauregui	Democratic	District No. 41	2016-	-	
Daniele Monroe-Moreno	Democratic	District No. 1	2016-	-	
Yvanna Cancela	Democratic	District No. 10	-	2016-	
Susie Martinez	Democratic	District No. 12	2018-	-	
Selena Torres	Democratic	District No. 3	2018-	-	
Bea Duran	Democratic	District No. 11	2018-	-	

== Asian American legislators ==
There have been three self-identified Asian Americans to serve in the Nevada Legislature. Although Sharron Angle said at a campaign stop in 2010 when running against Harry Reid for the United States Senate that, "I've been called the first Asian legislator in our Nevada State Assembly, " Angle never in fact identified herself as Asian American. One Asian-American legislator is currently serving as of the 2020 special sessions.

Legislator	Party	District/Area Represented	Assembly Term	Senate Term	Notes
Robert Wong	Republican	Clark No. 15	1990-1992	-	
Francis Allen	Republican	Clark No. 4	2004-2008	-	Defeated in the 2008 primary election
Rochelle Nguyen	Democratic	District No. 10	2018-	-	

== Native American legislators ==
The Nevada Legislature has had one self-identified Native American member, with none serving as of the 2020 special sessions.

Legislator	Party	District/Area Represented	Assembly Term	Senate Term	Notes
John Oceguera	Democratic	District No. 16	2000-2012	-	Enrolled member of Walker River Paiute Tribe; Speaker of Assembly in 2011 (first Native American Speaker in Nevada)

== LGBT legislators ==
The Nevada Legislature has had six members who identify with the LGBT community, with two serving as of the 2020 special sessions.

Legislator	Party	Area Represented/District	Assembly Term	Senate Term	Notes
David Parks	Democratic	District 41 (Assembly); District 7 (Senate)	1996-2008	2008-	Term Limited in the Assembly; Successfully ran for Senate in 2008; Lost a Primary Election to succeed Rory Reid on the Clark County Commission in 2010, remained in the Senate
James Healey	Democratic	District 35	2012-2014	-	Ran for re-election and lost
Andrew Martin	Democratic	District 9	2012-2014	-	Ran for Nevada State Controller in 2014 and lost
Patricia Spearman	Democratic	District 1	-	2012-	Defeated sitting Senator John Lee in a Democratic Primary
Kelvin Atkinson	Democratic	District 17 (Assembly); District 4 (Senate)	2002-2012	2012-2019	Came out during floor debate on the repeal of the ban of same gender marriage in April 2013; Senate Majority Leader in 2019 (first openly LGBT Majority Leader); Resigned in 2019 due to federal campaign finance charges
Nelson Araujo	Democratic	District 3	2014-2018	-	

== See also ==
- Nevada State Capitol
- Nevada Assembly
- Nevada Senate
