= Nevada Legislature =

Legislative branch of the state government of Nevada

Coordinates: 39.16194°N 119.7661°W

- 83rd Nevada Legislature
- Great Seal of the State of Nevada

- Nevada Legislative emblem

Type
- Type: Bicameral
- Houses: Senate; Assembly
- Term limits: 12 years

History
- New session started: February 2025

Leadership
- President of the Senate: Stavros Anthony (R) since January 2, 2023
- President pro tempore of the Senate: Marilyn Dondero Loop (D) since February 3, 2025
- Speaker of the Assembly: Steve Yeager (D) since February 6, 2023

Structure
- Seats: 63: 21 senators; 42 representatives
- Senate political groups: Democratic (13); Republican (8)
- Assembly political groups: Democratic (27); Republican (15)
- Length of term: Senate: 4 years Assembly: 2 years
- Salary: $150.71/day + per diem

Elections
- Last Senate election: November 5, 2024 (11 seats)
- Last Assembly election: November 5, 2024
- Next Senate election: November 3, 2026
- Next Assembly election: November 3, 2026
- Redistricting: Legislative control

Meeting place
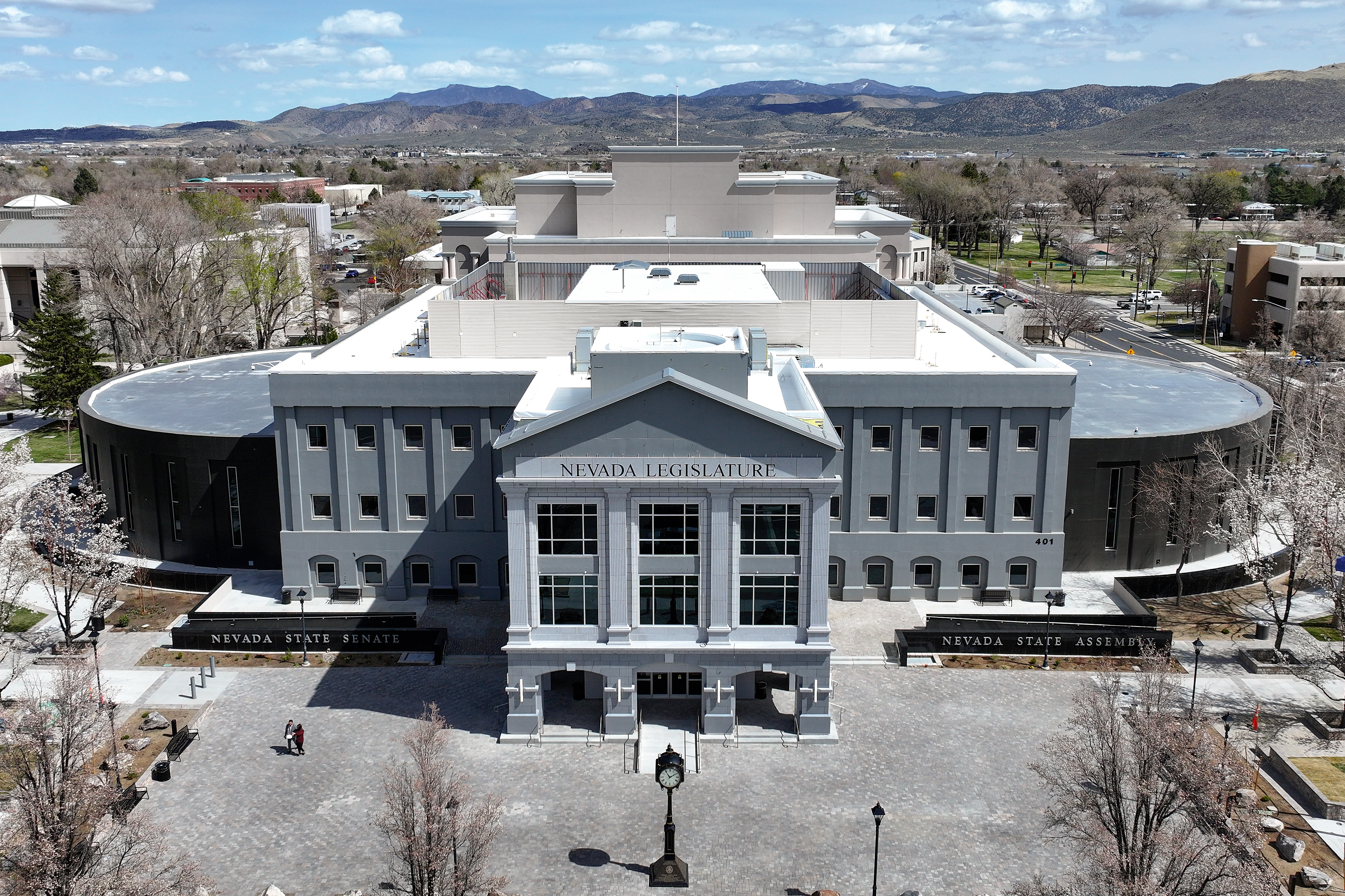
- Nevada State Legislature Building; Carson City

Website
- Official website

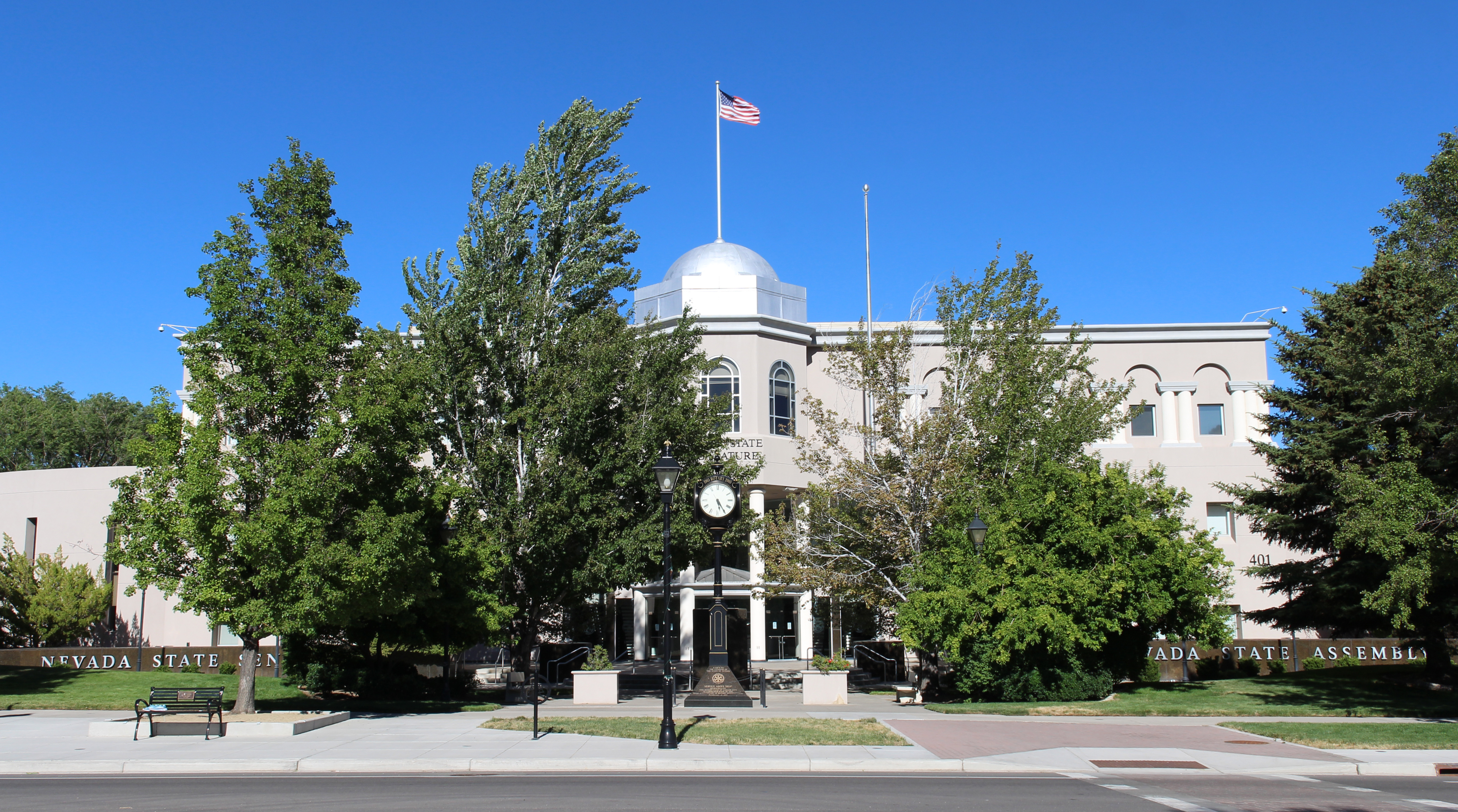
The Nevada State Legislature Building as seen from across South Carson Street.

The Nevada Legislature is the bicameral state legislature of the U.S. state of Nevada. Formed by the state's constitution of 1864, the Legislature consists of the Nevada Assembly, its lower house with 42 members and the Nevada Senate, its upper house with 21 members.

Regular sessions of the Legislature are biennial (once every two years), begin on the first Monday in February in odd-numbered years, and may not exceed 120 days. Special sessions can be called by the governor and, since 2013, by the Legislature itself if two-thirds of lawmakers agree. Legislative work continues between sessions in standing committees and the Nevada Legislative Counsel Bureau.

The Legislature, Nevada Supreme Court, and governor shared the Nevada State Capitol in Carson City until the Court moved into its own building in 1937; the Legislature moved to the Nevada State Legislative Building in 1971.

In 2019, Nevada became the first U.S. state with a female-majority legislature. As of most recent 83rd (2025) legislative session, women retain 62% of the seats overall and within each chamber, the highest in the nation.

As of 2025, members of the Democratic Party have a majority in both chambers since 2009.

With a total of 63 seats, it is the nation's third-smallest state legislature after Alaska (60) and Delaware (62).

== History ==
The Nevada Territorial Legislature was established upon creation of the Nevada Territory in 1861. It created the nine original counties during its first session outside Carson City.

Nevada became a state under the Nevada Constitution of 1864, vests the legislative authority of the state in a Senate and Assembly, which are designated "The Legislature of the State of Nevada". The legislature has the duty to establish the number of Senators and Assembly members and the legislative districts to which they are apportioned after each decennial census, though the total number of legislators may not exceed 75. The size of the Senate is tied to the size of the Assembly; the state constitution limits the Senate to no less than one-third and no greater than one-half of the size of the Assembly.

Redistricting bills passed by the legislature after the 2010 census were vetoed by the governor, and the legislature was unable to override those vetoes. Ultimately, Nevada's legislative districts as of 2011 were established by order of a state district court. Since that time, Senate districts have been formed by combining two neighboring Assembly districts.

Sadie Hurst (1857–1952) was the first woman elected to the Nevada Legislature (R-Washoe), in 1918. When the legislature met in special session on February 7, 1920, to ratify the Federal Suffrage Amendment, it was Hurst, the assemblywoman from Reno, who presented the resolution. She has the further distinction of being the first woman to preside over a state Legislature during the ratification of the Federal Suffrage Amendment.

Following the 2018 election, Nevada became the first state to have a female-majority legislature with 32 of 63 seats held by women.

=== Meeting places ===
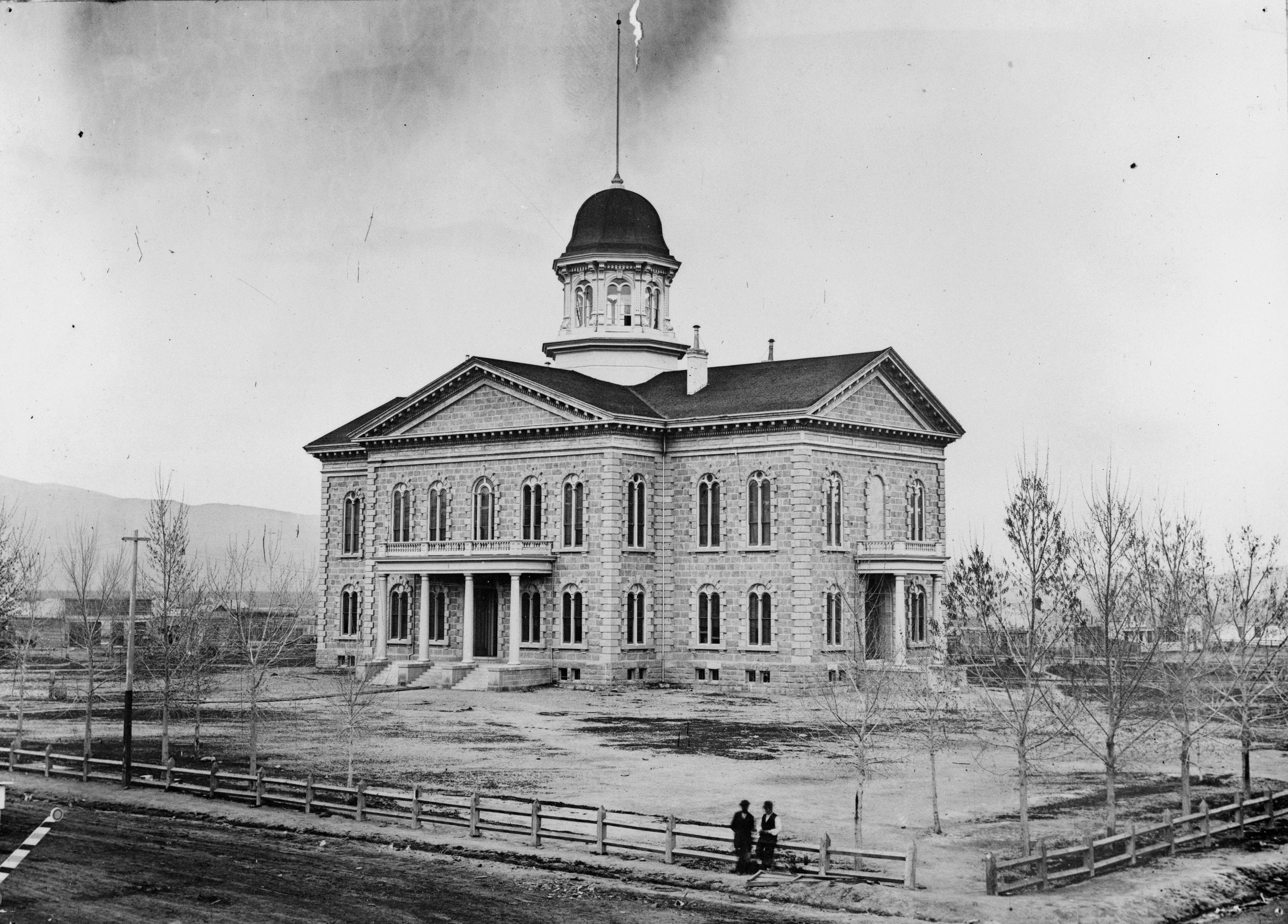
Nevada State Capitol in 1875

For seven years after Nevada's admission as a U.S. state in 1864, the Nevada Legislature did not have a proper meeting place. In 1869, the Legislature passed the State Capitol Act, signed into law by Governor Henry G. Blasdel, providing $100,000 for the construction of a capitol building. Under the supervision of designer Joseph Gosling, construction began on the Italianate building in 1870. The Legislature convened in the unfinished state capitol building the following year, with construction completed by the middle of the year. The Legislature continued to meet in the state capitol until 1971, when both chambers moved to the Legislative Building constructed just south of the original capitol. The old state capitol continues to be the office of the governor and other executive branch officials. The former Assembly and Senate chambers are now museums, and available for meetings.

== State Capitol Building ==
Abraham Curry, the founder of Carson City, reserved an area equivalent to four city blocks (10 acres or 4.04 ha) at the center of the town for the future state capitol. When the Capitol building was constructed, it was naturally located on "the plaza", which had, some ten or eleven years earlier, been designated for it, and given for that purpose. Mark Twain wrote in his book Roughing It that the capitol site was in 1861 "a large, unfenced, level vacancy, with a liberty pole in it, and very useful as a place for public auctions, horse trades, mass meetings, and likewise for teamsters to camp in."

The "act to provide for the erection of a State Capitol" was passed by the Nevada Legislature and signed into law by Governor Henry G. Blasdel during 1869. The Board of Capitol Commissioners received bids of $84,000 to $160,000 for construction and they chose the lowest bid, submitted by Peter Cavanaugh and Son of Carson City. The 1869 act authorized $100,000 for construction, with money to come from a special tax levy, plus the proceeds from the sale of some public land. To reduce costs, the building sandstone was obtained free of charge from the Nevada State Prison quarry, just outside Carson City. In spite of this, the construction costs increased to some $170,000, exceeding even the high bid.

The cornerstone was laid on June 9, 1870. A brass box that served as a time capsule was deposited in the stone. The cornerstone was a solid block of sandstone, laid on top of blocks which contained the capsule. The capsule was inspected and returned to the cornerstone location (the northeast corner of the original building) during reconstruction in the 1979–81 period.

The fourth session of the state legislature met in the still-incomplete building at the beginning of 1871. Construction was completed by May 1, 1871. Several of the architect's original drawings are preserved in the state archives.

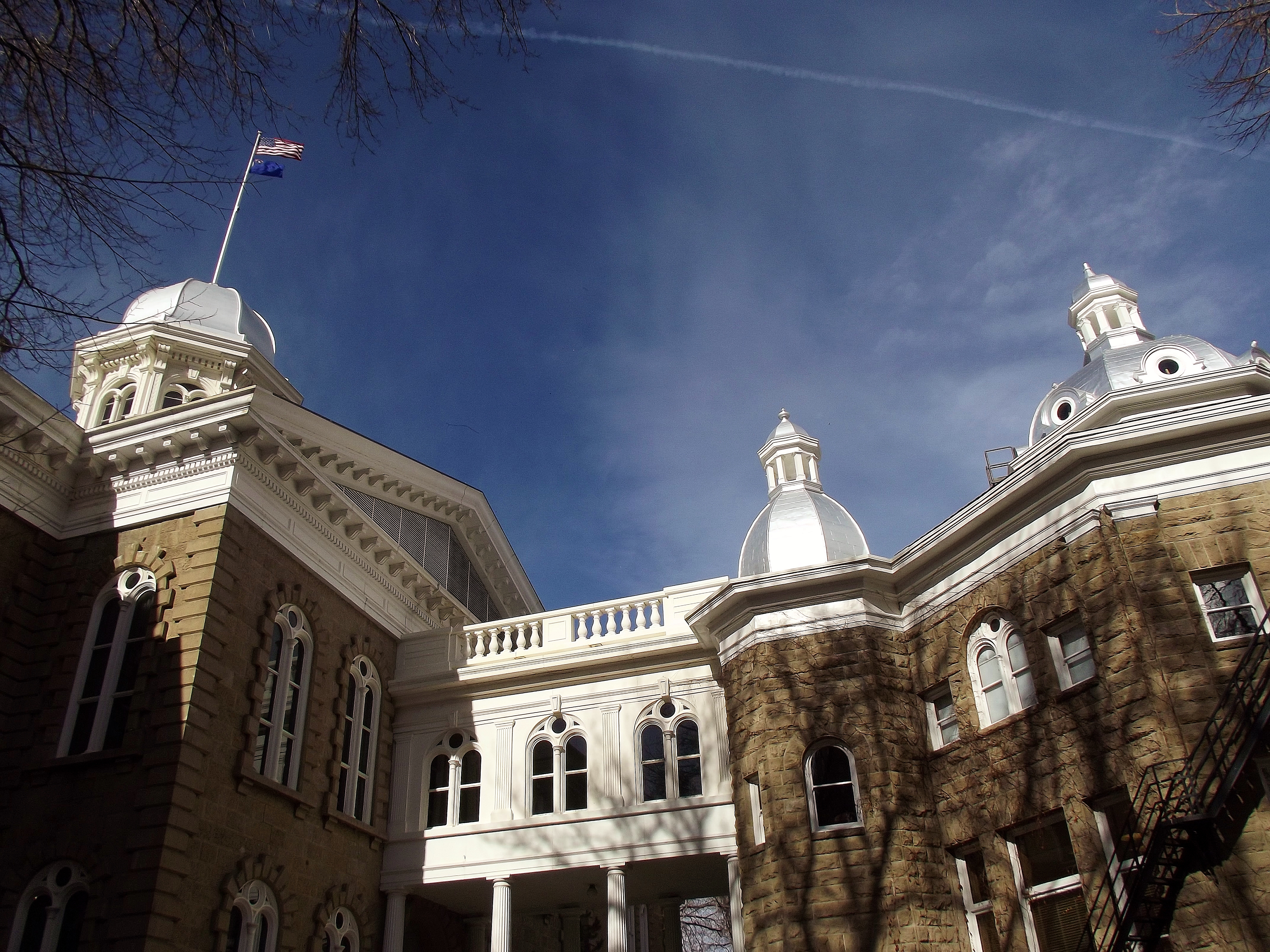
Octagonal annex

The original building was cruciform, with a central rectangle 76 feet (23 m) wide by 85 feet (26 m) deep (23 x 25.8 m). It had two wings, each 35 feet (11 m) wide by 52 feet (16 m) deep (10.6 x 15.8 m). The windows' glass panes are made of 26-ounce (737 g) French crystal, as are those above the doors. Floors and wainscotting are of Alaskan marble, shipped to San Francisco in 20-ton (18,144 kg) blocks and there cut and polished for installation.

The first floor contained a major office at each corner connected by central halls, while the wings of the second floor were filled by the two legislative chambers—the Assembly and the Senate. The octagonal dome topped with a cupola admitted light to the second story. During 1906, an octagonal Annex was added to the rear (east) of the capitol to house the State Library.

By the early 20th century, the legislature had outgrown the capitol, and prominent Nevada architect Frederic DeLongchamps was contracted to design northern and southern legislative wing-annexes, completed in time for the 1915 session. These compatible wings used stone from the same quarry as the original portion of the capitol, and provided more office space and expanded legislative chambers.

For more than 50 years, all three parts of the state government were housed in the Capitol. The Supreme Court met here until 1937, when it relocated into an adjacent building, and the Nevada Legislature met here until 1971, when it relocated to its new Legislative Building just south of the Capitol. Every Nevada governor except the first has had his office in the capitol. Nowadays, the Capitol continues to serve the Governor, and contains historical exhibits on the second floor

== Membership ==
Members of the Assembly are elected to a two-year term with term limits of six terms (12 years). Members of the Senate are elected to a four-year term and similarly face term limits of three terms (12 years). Term limits were amended to the Nevada Constitution following a voter referendum in 1996 as reflected in Nevada Constitution, Art. 4, Sec 4.

In order to be elected as a member in either chamber of the Legislature, a person must be a U.S. citizen, at least 21 years of age, a Nevada resident for one year, and a qualified voter in their residing district.

== Sessions ==
In addition to Carson City, the Legislature maintains a location in Las Vegas with offices for members of the Assembly, Senate, and staff of the Legislative Counsel Bureau. All three branches of state government maintain primary locations in both cities, as the state capital, Carson City, is 435 mi (700.06 km) away from the majority of the state's population in Clark County.

Legislative sessions commence on the first Monday of February following the election of members of the Assembly. The Legislature must adjourn sine die each regular session not later than midnight Pacific Time 120 calendar days following its commencement. Any legislative action taken after midnight on the 120th calendar day is void unless it occurs during a special session convened by the governor. The governor is obligated to submit the proposed executive budget to the Legislature not later than 14 calendar days before the commencement of each regular session.

Sessions of the Legislature are biennial, occurring during odd number years. The Nevada Legislature is one of only four states that have biennial sessions, the others being Montana, North Dakota, and Texas. However, two-thirds of the legislature or the governor may call a special session at any time. From 2014 to 2024, five special sessions were called, two in 2020 to address the COVID-19 pandemic, and the other three to ratify incentive packages for the Gigafactory, Allegiant Stadium, and the New Las Vegas Stadium.

== Standing committees ==
Assembly standing committees (83rd legislative session, 2025)
Committee	Chair	Vice-Chair	Membership
Commerce and Labor	Elaine H. Marzola	Sandra Jauregui	Majority: Natha Anderson, Max Carter, Brittney Miller, Daniele Monroe-Moreno, Erica Roth, Selena Torres-Fossett, Steve Yeager Minority: Lisa Cole, Melissa Hardy, Heidi Kasama, P. K. O’Neill, Toby Yurek
Education	Selena Torres-Fossett	Reuben D’Silva	Majority: Joe Dalia, Tanya Flanagan, Linda Hunt, Selena La Rue Hatch, Erica Mosca, David Orentlicher Minority: Rich DeLong, Alexis Hansen, Melissa Hardy, Gregory Koenig
Government Affairs	Venicia Considine	Duy Nguyen	Majority: Max Carter, Reuben D’Silva, Tanya Flanagan, Heather Goulding, Linda Hunt, Jovan Jackson, Venise Karris Minority: Rich DeLong, Rebecca Edgeworth, Danielle Gallant, Bert Gurr, Heidi Kasama
Growth and Infrastructure	Howard Watts	Max Carter	Majority: Shea Backus, Tracy Brown-May, Venise Karris, Cinthia Zermeño Moore, Duy Nguyen Minority: Jill Dickman, Danielle Gallant, Bert Gurr, Toby Yurek
Health and Human Services	Tracy Brown-May	Duy Nguyen	Majority: Joe Dalia, Cecelia González, Heather Goulding, Linda Hunt, Jovan Jackson, Hanadi Nadeem, David Orentlicher Minority: Rebecca Edgeworth, Ken Gray, Gregory Hafen, Brian Hibbetts, Gregory Koenig
Judiciary	Brittney Miller	Elaine H. Marzola	Majority: Joe Dalia, Cecelia González, Selena La Rue Hatch, Cinthia Zermeño Moore, Hanadi Nadeem, David Orentlicher, Erica Roth Minority: Lisa Cole, Ken Gray, Alexis Hansen, Melissa Hardy, Toby Yurek
Legislative Operations and Elections	Erica Mosca	Cecelia González	Majority: Sandra Jauregui, Brittney Miller, Daniele Monroe-Moreno, Cinthia Zermeño Moore, Hanadi Nadeem Minority: Lisa Cole, Jill Dickman, Rebecca Edgeworth, Brian Hibbetts
Natural Resources	Natha Anderson	Selena La Rue Hatch	Majority: Venicia Considine, Jovan Jackson, Venise Karris, Elaine H. Marzola, Howard Watts Minority: Rich DeLong, Bert Gurr, Alexis Hansen, Heidi Kasama
Revenue	Shea Backus	Venicia Considine	Majority: Reuben D’Silva, Tanya Flanagan, Heather Goulding, Duy Nguyen, Erica Roth Minority: Danielle Gallant, Ken Gray, Gregory Hafen, P. K. O’Neill
Ways and Means	Daniele Monroe-Moreno	Shea Backus	Majority: Natha Anderson, Tracy Brown-May, Sandra Jauregui, Erica Mosca, Selena Torres-Fossett, Howard Watts, Steve Yeager Minority: Jill Dickman, Gregory Hafen, Brian Hibbetts, Gregory Koenig, P. K. O’Neill

Senate standing committees (83rd legislative session, 2025)
Committee	Chair	Vice-Chair	Membership
Commerce and Labor	Julie Pazina	Skip Daly	Majority: Edgar Flores, Roberta Lange, Melanie Scheible Minority: John Ellison, Lori Rogich, John Steinbeck
Education	Angela Taylor	Marilyn Dondero Loop	Majority: Michelee Cruz-Crawford, Fabian Doñate Minority: Carrie Buck, Lori Rogich, Robin Titus
Finance	Marilyn Dondero Loop	Rochelle Nguyen	Majority: Nicole Cannizzaro, Dina Neal, Angela Taylor Minority: Carrie Buck, Jeff Stone, Robin Titus
Government Affairs	Edgar Flores	James Ohrenschall	Majority: Skip Daly, Dina Neal Minority: John Ellison, Lisa Krasner, Lori Rogich
Growth and Infrastructure	Rochelle Nguyen	Julie Pazina	Majority: Fabian Doñate Minority: Carrie Buck, Ira Hansen
Health and Human Services	Fabian Doñate	Angela Taylor	Majority: Roberta Lange Minority: Jeff Stone, Robin Titus
Judiciary	Melanie Scheible	Edgar Flores	Majority: Roberta Lange, Rochelle Nguyen, James Ohrenschall Minority: John Ellison, Ira Hansen, Lisa Krasner
Legislative Operations and Elections	James Ohrenschall	Skip Daly	Majority: Nicole Cannizzaro Minority: Lisa Krasner, John Steinbeck
Natural Resources	Michelee Cruz-Crawford	Melanie Scheible	Majority: Julie Pazina Minority: John Ellison, Ira Hansen
Revenue and Economic Development	Dina Neal	Fabian Doñate	Majority: Michelee Cruz-Crawford Minority: John Steinbeck, Jeff Stone

== Legislative Counsel Bureau ==
The Nye Building in Las Vegas includes publicly accessible hearing rooms for parties to attend sessions of the Legislature.

The Nevada Legislative Counsel Bureau is a state agency within the Legislature responsible for legal research, legislative and financial impact studies on proposed legislation, and historical and background research.

With offices at the state capitol in Carson City and Las Vegas, the bureau operates under the direction of the Nevada Legislative Commission, a twelve-member body composed of legislators from both the Nevada Assembly and Senate and both parties. With the legislature being biennial, or every two years, the commission meets during interim sessions and oversees the work of the bureau, including approval of special audits and research studies.

As of July 2026, the bureau's director is Asher Killian who was selected to lead the bureau by its governing commission. Previously, he served in the bureau as the deputy legislative counsel and chief deputy legislative counsel.

== Police ==
Law enforcement and security for the Legislature is provided by the Nevada Legislative Police, which is made up of full-time, year round police officers supported by temporary police officers brought in when the Legislature is in session. They are separate to the Nevada Capitol Police.

== See also ==
- Nevada State Capitol
- Nevada Assembly
- Nevada Senate
- Diversity in the Nevada Legislature
- List of Nevada state legislatures
- List of state and territorial capitols in the United States
