= Miguel Dávila =

Miguel Dávila may refer to:

- Miguel R. Dávila (1856–1927), President of Honduras
- Miguel Dávila (American politician), Venezuelan-born American politician in Nevada
