= Elliot Anderson (politician) =

American politician (born 1982)

Elliot T. Anderson, Esq.

Member of the Nevada Assembly from the 15th district
- In office February 7, 2011 – February 4, 2019
- Preceded by: Kathy McClain
- Succeeded by: Howard Watts III

Personal details
- Born: November 15, 1982 (age 43) Marshfield, Wisconsin, U.S.
- Party: Democratic
- Education: University of Nevada, Las Vegas (BA); William S. Boyd School of Law (JD)
- Website: assemblymananderson.com

Military service
- Branch/service: United States Marine Corps
- Years of service: 2001–2005

Elliot T. Anderson (born November 15, 1982, in Marshfield, Wisconsin) is an American politician who formerly represented District 15 as a Democratic member in the Nevada Assembly from 2011 to 2019.

== Education ==
Anderson earned his BA from UNLV and his JD from the William S. Boyd School of Law at UNLV.

== Elections ==
- 2012 Anderson won the June 12, 2012 Democratic Primary with 1,632 votes (84.34%) against former Assemblyman Lou Toumin and won the November 6, 2012 General election with 11,809 votes (72.05%) against Republican nominee Megan Heryet.
- 2010 When Democratic Assemblywoman Kathy McClain ran for Nevada Senate and left the House District 15 seat open, Anderson won the four-way June 8, 2010 Democratic Primary with 1,108 votes (45.80%) in a field which included former Assemblyman Lou Toomin, and won the November 2, 2010 General election with 6,760 votes (62.63%) against Republican nominee Dale Snyder and Independent American candidate Stan Vaughan; Snyder had run for the seat in 2008, and Vaughan had run for Nevada Legislature seats in 2004, 2006, and 2008.
