= Tyrone Thompson =

Tyrone Thompson may refer to:

- Tyrone Thompson (footballer)
- Tyrone Thompson (rugby)
- Tyrone Thompson (politician)
