= Kyle James Stephens =

American politician

Member of the Nevada Assembly from the 5th district
- In office September 30, 2016 – November 9, 2016
- Preceded by: Erven T. Nelson
- Succeeded by: Brittney Miller

Personal details
- Born: 1956 (age 69–70) Scotia, California
- Party: Republican

Kyle James Stephens (born 1955/56) is a Republican former member of the Nevada Assembly. He was appointed to replace Erven T. Nelson, who resigned.

== Biography ==
Stephens graduated from Brigham Young University and serves as an account representative for Brady Industries. Following Nelson's resignation, he was appointed to the Assembly in September 2016 by the Clark County Commission for the 2016 special session. He was selected unanimously over former assemblyman Garn Mabey and businessman Ron Coury.

Stephens did not stand for election in November 2016 and was succeeded by Democrat Brittney Miller.

== Personal life ==
Stephens and his wife, Julia, have three children; Justin, Deven, and Diana.
