= 1st Nevada Territorial Legislature =

1861 Council and House of Representatives

First Nevada Territorial Legislature
2nd Nevada Territorial Legislature	→

Overview
- Meeting place: Carson City
- Term: October 1, 1861 – November 11, 1862
- Election: August 31, 1861

Council
- Members: 10
- President: J. L. Van Bokkelen

House of Representatives
- Members: 15
- Speaker: Miles N. Mitchell

The first Nevada Territorial Legislature first convened on October 1, 1861. It consisted of the Council with ten seats and the House of Representatives with fifteen seats.

== Background ==
The Territory of Nevada was created on March 2, 1861 out of the western part of Utah Territory. On July 24, Governor James W. Nye ordered elections for the territorial legislature and a census to determine the districts. The elections were held on August 31.

== Session ==
One regular session was held between October 1 and November 29, 1861. The meeting place was the top floor of Warm Springs Hotel just outside Carson City, that was owned by Abraham Curry. Laws that were passed included ones creating the original nine counties, determining the county seats, and ratifying Governor Nye's decision to select Carson City as the capital of the territory. A total of 107 pieces of legislation were passed.

== Members ==
=== Council ===
Name	District	Residence
J. W. Pugh	1	Aurora
Ira M. Luther	2	Genoa
William Morris Stewart	3	Carson City
John W. Grier	4	Silver City
Thomas Hannah	5	Gold Hill
A. W. Pray	6	Virginia City
J. L. Van Bokkelen	6	Virginia City
Solomon Geller	7	Washoe Valley
[Empty]	8	N/A
Isaac Roop	9	Honey Lake

=== House of Representatives ===
Name	District	Residence
William E. Teall	1	Aurora
Samual Youngs	1	Aurora
James McLean	2	Genoa
William P. Harrington, jr.	3	Carson City
John D. Winters	3	Carson City
William L. Card	4	Silver City
R. M. Ford	4	Dayton
John H. Mills	5	Gold Hill
Mark H. Bryan	6	Virginia City
Ephraim Durham	6	Virginia City
Miles N. Mitchell	6	Virginia City
Edward C. Ing	7	Truckee Meadows
James H. Sturtevant	7	Washoe Valley
William J. Osborn	8	Buckland's
John C. Wright	9	Honey Lake Valley

Preceded by None	First Nevada Territorial Legislature; 1861	Succeeded by 2nd Nevada Territorial Legislature
