= Julia Bulette =

American prostitute

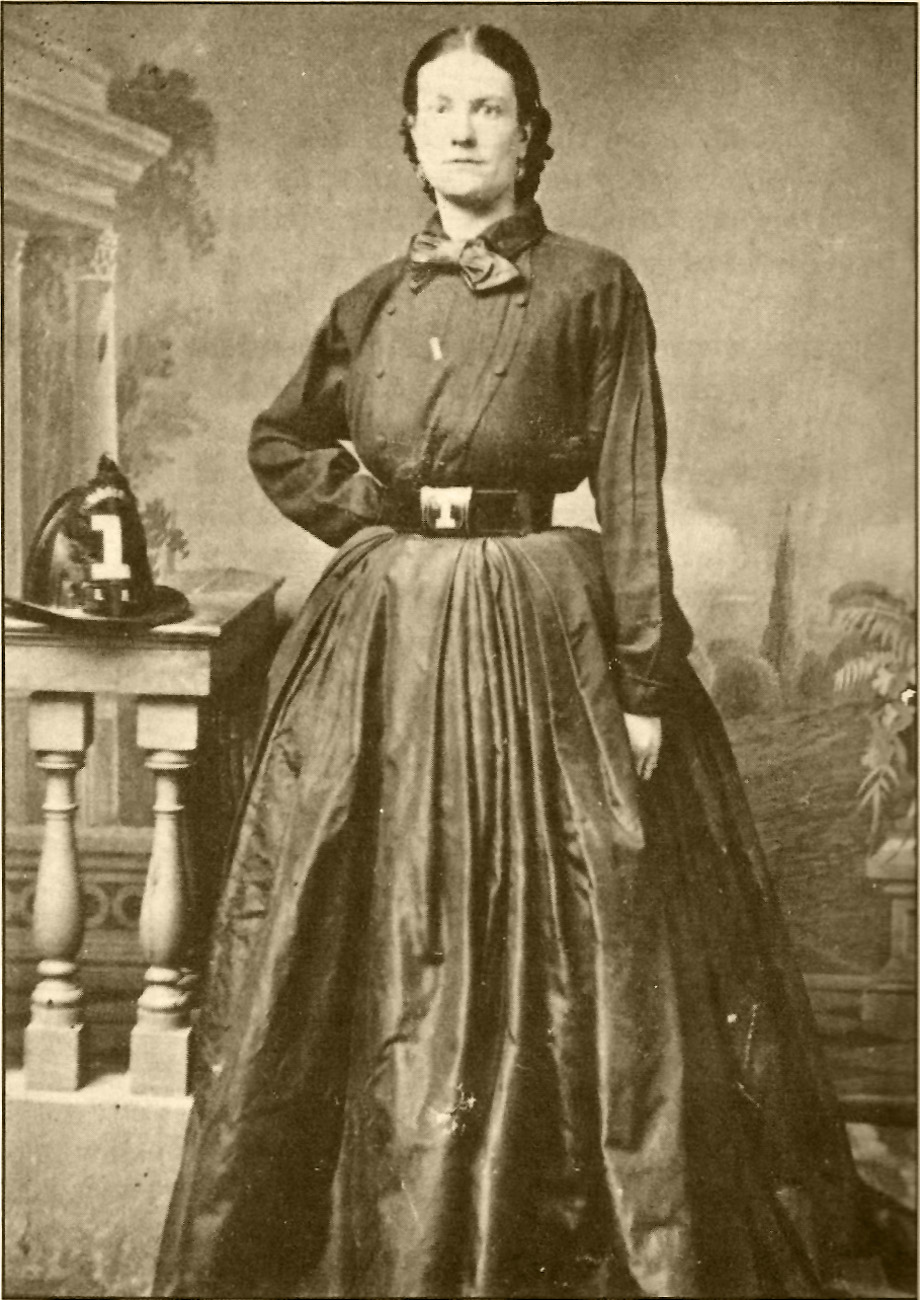
- Born: Jule Bulette c. 1832; London, England, United Kingdom
- Died: January 19/20, 1867 (aged 34–35); Virginia City, Nevada, United States
- Cause of death: Murder by strangulation
- Occupations: Prostitute; madam
- Years active: 1859–1867
- Known for: Being the proprietor of the most popular brothel in Virginia City, Nevada, in the American frontier

Julia Bulette (c. 1832 – January 19/20, 1867) was an English-born American sex worker in Virginia City, Nevada, a boomtown serving the Comstock Lode silver mine. She was murdered in 1867, and a French drifter named John Millain was quickly convicted and hanged for the crime. Subsequent legends surrounding Julia's life and status as a sex worker and a madam have grown over time and become a part of Virginia City's folklore.

== Biography ==
Juliette "Julie" Bulette was born in London and moved to New Orleans with her family in the late 1830s. In about 1852 or 1853, she moved to California, where she lived in various places until her arrival in 1859 in Virginia City, Nevada, a mining boomtown since the Comstock Lode silver strike that same year. As she was the only woman in the area, she became greatly sought after by the miners. She quickly took up prostitution. Jule, or Julia (as she became known), was described as a beautiful, tall, and slim brunette with dark eyes and refined in manner with a humorous, witty personality.

"Jule" Bulette lived and worked out of a small rented cottage near the corner of D and Union streets in Virginia City's entertainment district. An independent operator, she competed with the fancy brothels, streetwalkers, and hurdy-gurdy girls for meager earnings.

Contemporary newspaper accounts of her gruesome murder captured popular imagination. With few details of her life, twentieth-century chroniclers elevated the courtesan to the status of folk heroine, ascribing to her the questionable attributes of wealth, beauty, and social standing. In reality, Bulette was ill and in debt at the time of her death.

=== Death ===
On the morning of January 20, 1867, Bulette's partially naked body was found by her maid in her bedroom. She had been strangled and bludgeoned to death.

A little over a year later, John Millain, a French drifter, was arrested and charged with the crime. On April 24, 1868, he went to the gallows, swearing he was not guilty of having killed Bulette, but had been only an accomplice in the theft of her meager belongings. Millain's hanging was witnessed by author Mark Twain.

== Legacy ==
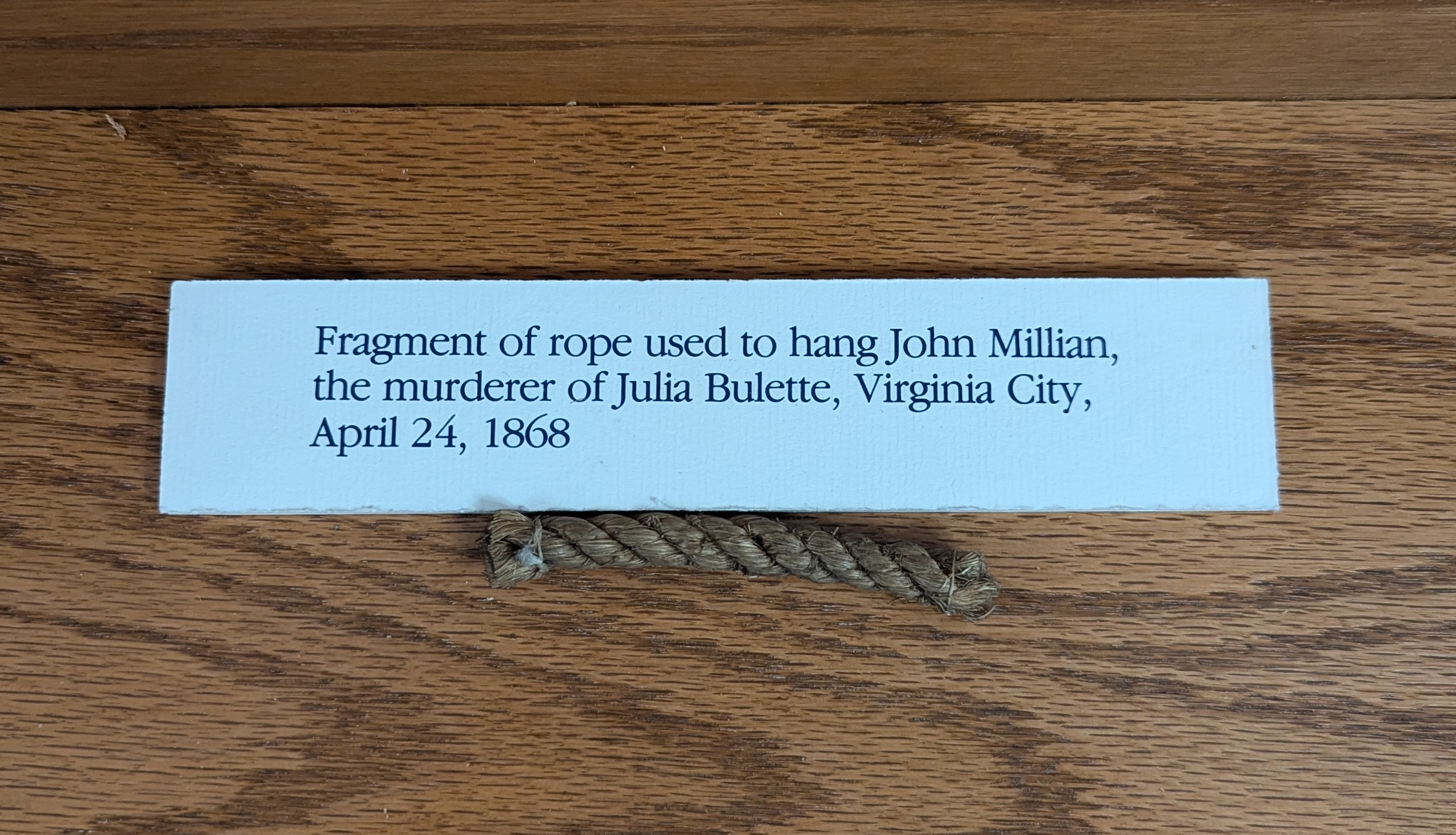
Section of rope used to hang John Millain, convicted of killing Julia Bulette, on display at the Nevada Capitol.

Bulette's legend continued after her death. The Virginia and Truckee Railroad honored her memory by naming one of its richly furnished club coaches after her. Her portrait hung in many Virginia City saloons, and author Rex Beach immortalized her as Cherry Malotte in his novel The Spoilers. Oscar Lewis, in his book Silver Kings, reported that Bulette was written about more than any other woman of the Comstock Lode bonanza.

Only two authentic portraits exist of Bulette; one is a photograph which shows her standing beside an Engine Number 1 fireman's hat. A third photograph, previously identified as her, was most likely that of her maid, who was also named Julia. (Note: Note:This photograph shows a dark-skinned young woman, possibly of mixed race, in modest attire without cosmetics and little jewelry, which does not correspond to contemporary descriptions of the richly-dressed madam, nor does it resemble the other two authenticated pictures of Julia.)

The television show Bonanza aired an episode called "The Julia Bulette Story" (Season 1, Episode 6, October 17, 1959) in which Julia is portrayed by actress Jane Greer.

The Virginia City chapter of E Clampus Vitus, a men's historical society, is named #1864 "Julia C Bulette" in her honor. Also named in her honor is Bulette Drive in Carson City, Nevada.

== See also ==
- Prostitution in the United States
- List of homicides in Nevada
