= Erven T. Nelson =

American politician

Member of the Nevada Assembly from the 5th district
- In office November 5, 2014 – February 10, 2016
- Preceded by: Marilyn Dondero Loop
- Succeeded by: Kyle James Stephens

Personal details
- Born: 1956 (age 69–70) Washington, D.C., U.S.
- Party: Republican
- Spouse: Lisa Nelson
- Children: Joel, Derek, Brooke, Paige, Hayley, Rex, Nina
- Education: Brigham Young University; J. Reuben Clark Law School
- Occupation: Lawyer, politician

Erven T. Nelson (born 1956) is an American lawyer and politician. He served as a Republican member of the Nevada Assembly from 2014 to 2016.

== Early life ==
Erven T. Nelson was born in 1956 in Washington, D.C.

Nelson was educated at Clark High School in Las Vegas, Nevada. He graduated from Brigham Young University, where he received a bachelor of arts degree in political science. He received a juris doctor from BYU's J. Reuben Clark Law School.

== Career ==
Nelson is a lawyer. He was a law clerk to United States District Judge Roger D. Foley from 1983 to 1984. He has been a member of the Nevada Bar Association since 1987. He serves as a shareholder of the World Services Group. He is a member of the Federalist Society, the Mortgage Bankers Association and the American Bankruptcy Institute.

Nelson served as a Republican member of the Nevada Assembly. He has proposed a bill to amend the Constitution of Nevada with Voter ID requirements. Additionally, he has indicated he would be willing to cast a vote in favor of non-discrimination bills for LGBT Nevadans.

== Personal life ==
With his wife Lisa, he has seven children. He is a member of the Church of Jesus Christ of Latter-day Saints.
