= Frank G. Edwards House =

Historic house in California, United States

- U.S. National Register of Historic Places
- California Historical Landmark
- San Francisco Designated Landmark
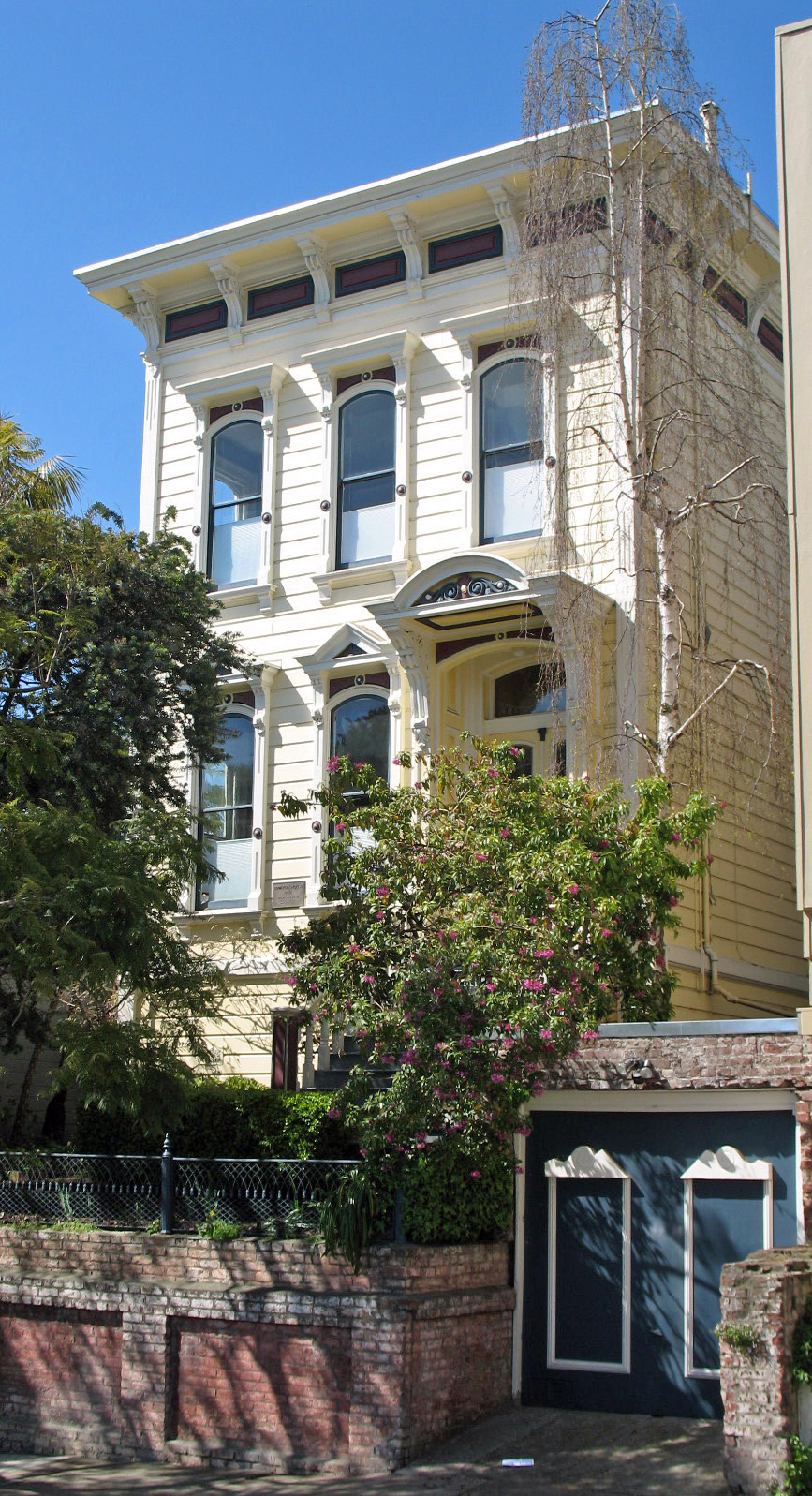

- Location within San Francisco Location within California Location within the United States
- Location: 1366 Guerrero Street; San Francisco, California, U.S.
- Coordinates: 37°44′57.5″N 122°25′22.5″W
- Area: 0.14 acres (0.057 ha)
- Built: 1883
- Architect: Joseph Gosling
- Architectural style: Italianate
- NRHP reference No.: 82000986
- CHISL No.: N1150
- SFDL No.: 189

Significant dates
- Added to NRHP: September 30, 1982
- Designated CHISL: October 29, 1982
- Designated SFDL: December 17, 1988

The Frank G. Edwards House is a historic residential building built in 1883, and located at 1366 Guerrero Street in the Noe Valley section of San Francisco, California.

The Frank G. Edwards House is listed on the National Register of Historic Places since September 30, 1982; listed as a California Historical Landmark since October 29, 1982; and listed as a San Francisco Designated Landmark since December 17, 1988.

== History ==
It was built in 1883 and designed by local architect Joseph Gosling. The house is flat front Italianate in style, and reflects the emergence of the popular Stick-style with its flattened features.

Frank G. Edwards (1822–1900) was an English-born importer, publisher, and civic leader, and had worked in the carpet and wallpaper business with his business "Pioneer Carpet House". He was a member of the Vigilance Committee and the San Francisco Fire Department.

== See also ==
- National Register of Historic Places listings in San Francisco
