= Kasina Douglass-Boone =

American politician (born 1974)

Member of the Nevada Assembly from the 17th district
- In office July 7, 2020 – November 4, 2020
- Preceded by: Tyrone Thompson
- Succeeded by: Clara Thomas

Personal details
- Born: 1974 (age 51–52) Las Vegas, Nevada
- Party: Democratic
- Education: Western High School; Community College of Southern Nevada; Ashford University

Kasina Diane Douglass-Boone (born 1974) is a former member of the Nevada Assembly.

== Early life and education ==
Douglass-Boone was born in 1974 in Las Vegas, Nevada. Douglass-Boone graduated from Western High School. Douglass-Boone earned a A.A. from the Community College of Southern Nevada and a B.S. from Ashford University in Clinton, Iowa.

== Career ==
Douglass-Boone has worked for the Clark County School District for more than 20 years. She has worked in a number of different capacities for the district, including as a social worker. On June 9, 2020, Douglass-Boone ran unsuccessfully in the primary for the Clark County Board of Trustees seat representing District B. On July 7, 2020, Douglass-Boone was appointed by the Clark County Commission to fill the vacancy in the Nevada Assembly left by Tyrone Thompson's death. She was the only one who applied to fill the vacancy. She represented the 17th district of the state assembly until November 4, 2020.

In 2022, Douglass-Boone supported a ballot initiative proposed by a culinary union seeking to cap rent payments in North Las Vegas, citing her own experiences with high rent.

== Personal life ==
Kasina is married to Anthony Boone III.
