= Steven Brooks (Nevada politician) =

American politician

Member of the Nevada House of Representatives from the 19th district
- In office 2011–2012

Member of the Nevada House of Representatives from the 17th district
- In office February 4, 2013 – March 28, 2013

Steven Brooks is a former American politician who served as a Democratic member of the Nevada Assembly. He represented District 19 from 2011 to 2012, and District 17 from February 4, 2013, to March 28, 2013. Brooks became the first lawmaker to be expelled from the Nevada State Legislature. Prior to winning elective office, Brooks was a teacher.

After being passed over for a committee position, Brooks allegedly threatened to kill Nevada State Legislature House Speaker Marilyn Kirkpatrick. A month later he was arrested on a charge of domestic battery and resisting arrest. Police also found a gun in his possession which was not registered to him. He was then expelled from the Nevada legislature by a two thirds vote.

A few hours later he was arrested again after a high speed chase in California. Brooks spent nearly a year and a half in prison after pleading guilty to charges of resisting a public officer with a firearm and possession of a firearm by a prohibited person. Brooks said he was addicted to marijuana at the time of his arrest.

In April 2019, Brooks was arrested a third time after police said he started a fight at a convenience store and threatened to kill Las Vegas police officers.
