= Nevada State Capitol =

State capitol building of the U.S. state of Nevada

- U.S. National Register of Historic Places
- Nevada Historical Marker
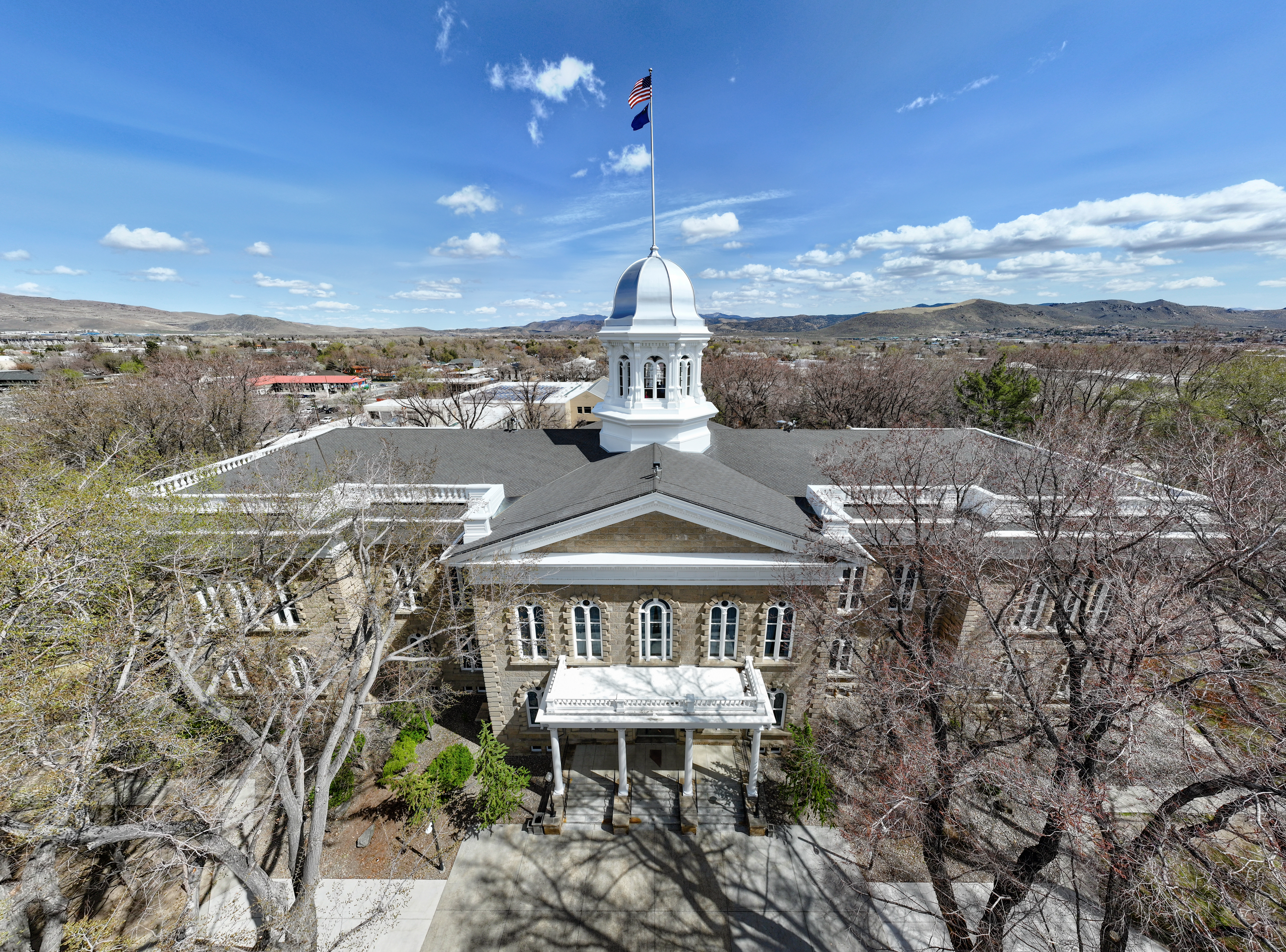
- Front façade
- Location: 101 North Carson Street; Carson City, Nevada
- Coordinates: 39°9′51″N 119°45′59″W
- Built: 1871; 155 years ago
- Architect: Joseph Gosling
- Architectural style: Neoclassical Italianate
- NRHP reference No.: 75002126
- No.: 25
- Added to NRHP: June 10, 1975

The Nevada State Capitol is the capitol building of the U.S. state of Nevada located in the state capital of Carson City at 101 North Carson Street. The building was constructed in the Neoclassical Italianate style between 1869 and 1871. It is listed in the National Register of Historic Places. It is also Nevada Historical Marker number 25.

== Construction ==
Abraham Curry, the founder of Carson City, reserved an area equivalent to four city blocks (10 acres or 4.04 ha) at the center of the town for the future state capitol. When the Capitol building was constructed, it was naturally located on "the plaza", which had, some ten or eleven years earlier, been designated for it, and given for that purpose. Mark Twain wrote in his book Roughing It that the capitol site was in 1861 "a large, unfenced, level vacancy, with a liberty pole in it, and very useful as a place for public auctions, horse trades, mass meetings, and likewise for teamsters to camp in."

The "act to provide for the erection of a State Capitol" was passed by the Nevada Legislature and signed into law by Governor Henry G. Blasdel during 1869. The Board of Capitol Commissioners received bids of $84,000 to $160,000 for construction and they chose the lowest bid, submitted by Peter Cavanaugh and Son of Carson City. The 1869 act authorized $100,000 for construction, with money to come from a special tax levy, plus the proceeds from the sale of some public land. To reduce costs, the building sandstone was obtained free of charge from the Nevada State Prison quarry, just outside Carson City. In spite of this, the construction costs increased to some $170,000, exceeding even the high bid.

The cornerstone was laid on June 9, 1870. A brass box that served as a time capsule was deposited in the stone. The cornerstone was a solid block of sandstone, laid on top of blocks which contained the capsule. The capsule was inspected and returned to the cornerstone location (the northeast corner of the original building) during reconstruction in the 1979–81 period.

The fourth session of the state legislature met in the still-incomplete building at the beginning of 1871. Construction was completed by May 1, 1871. Several of the architect's original drawings are preserved in the state archives.

== Architecture ==
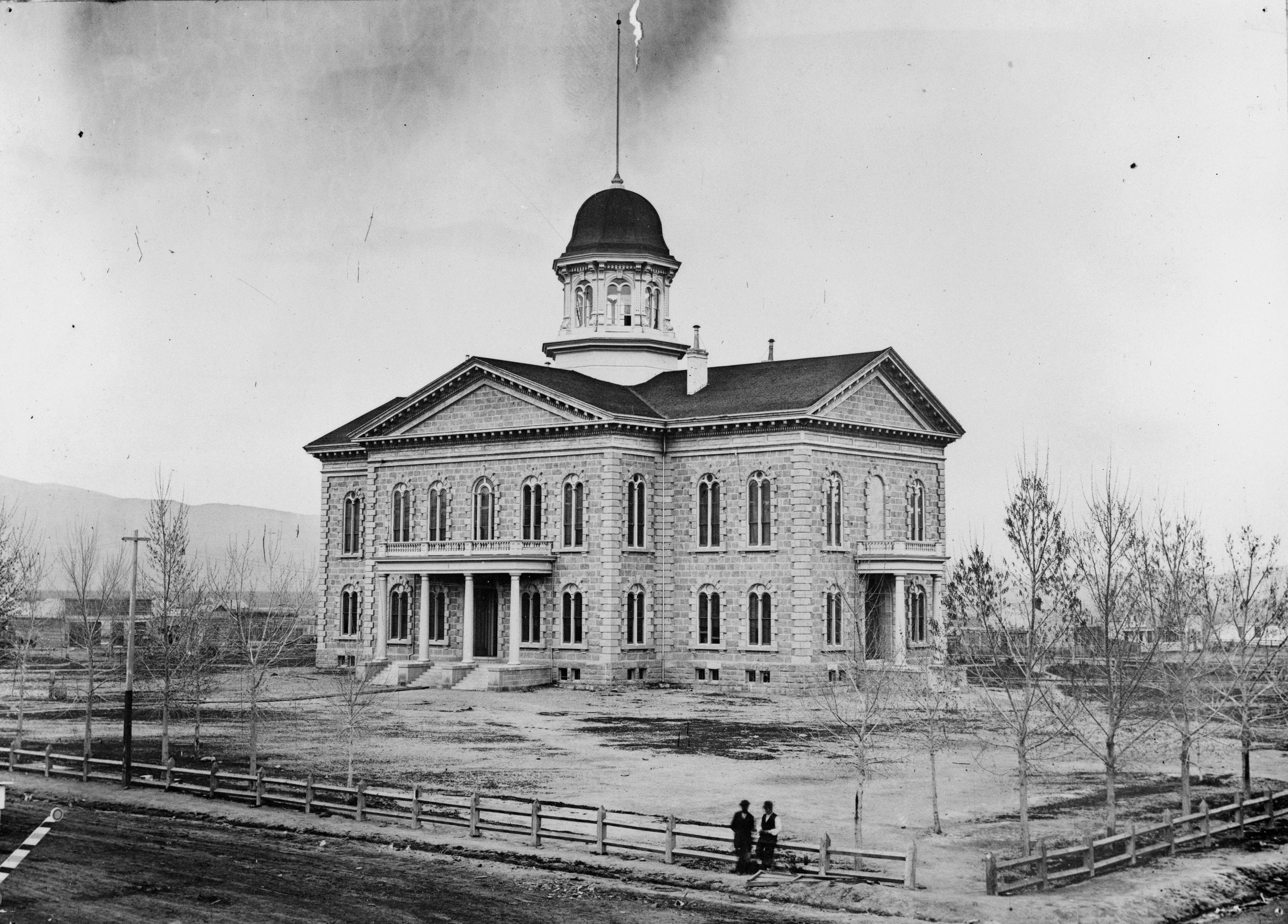
Nevada State Capitol in 1875

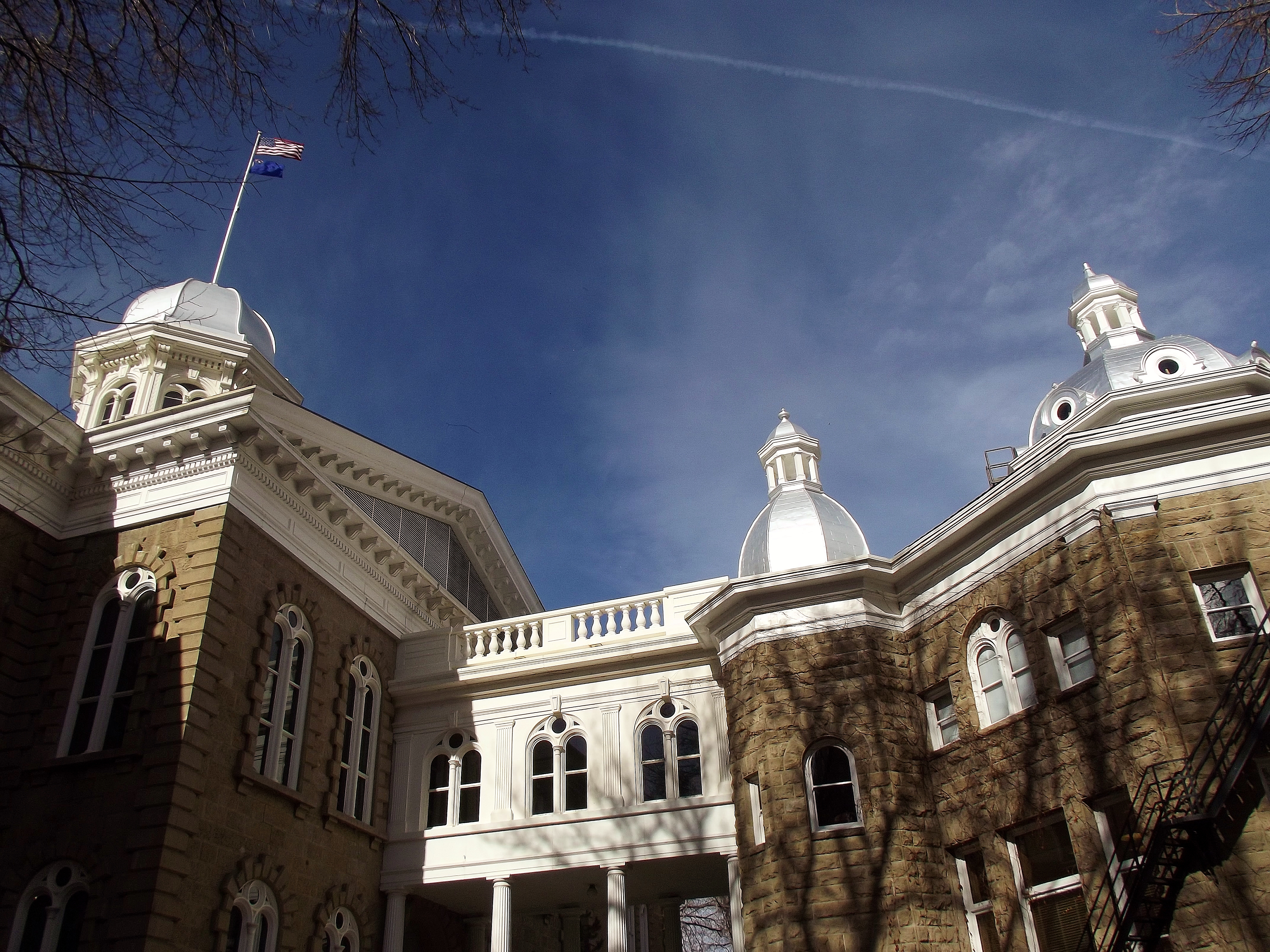
Octagonal annex

The original building was cruciform, with a central rectangle 76 feet (23 m) wide by 85 feet (26 m) deep (23 x 25.8 m). It had two wings, each 35 feet (11 m) wide by 52 feet (16 m) deep (10.6 x 15.8 m). The windows' glass panes are made of 26-ounce (737 g) French crystal, as are those above the doors. Floors and wainscotting are of Alaskan marble, shipped to San Francisco in 20-ton (18,144 kg) blocks and there cut and polished for installation.

The first floor contained a major office at each corner connected by central halls, while the wings of the second floor were filled by the two legislative chambers—the Assembly and the Senate. The octagonal dome topped with a cupola admitted light to the second story. During 1906, an octagonal Annex was added to the rear (east) of the capitol to house the State Library.

By the early 20th century, the legislature had outgrown the capitol, and prominent Nevada architect Frederic DeLongchamps was contracted to design northern and southern legislative wing-annexes, completed in time for the 1915 session. These compatible wings used stone from the same quarry as the original portion of the capitol, and provided more office space and expanded legislative chambers.

== Artwork and exhibits ==
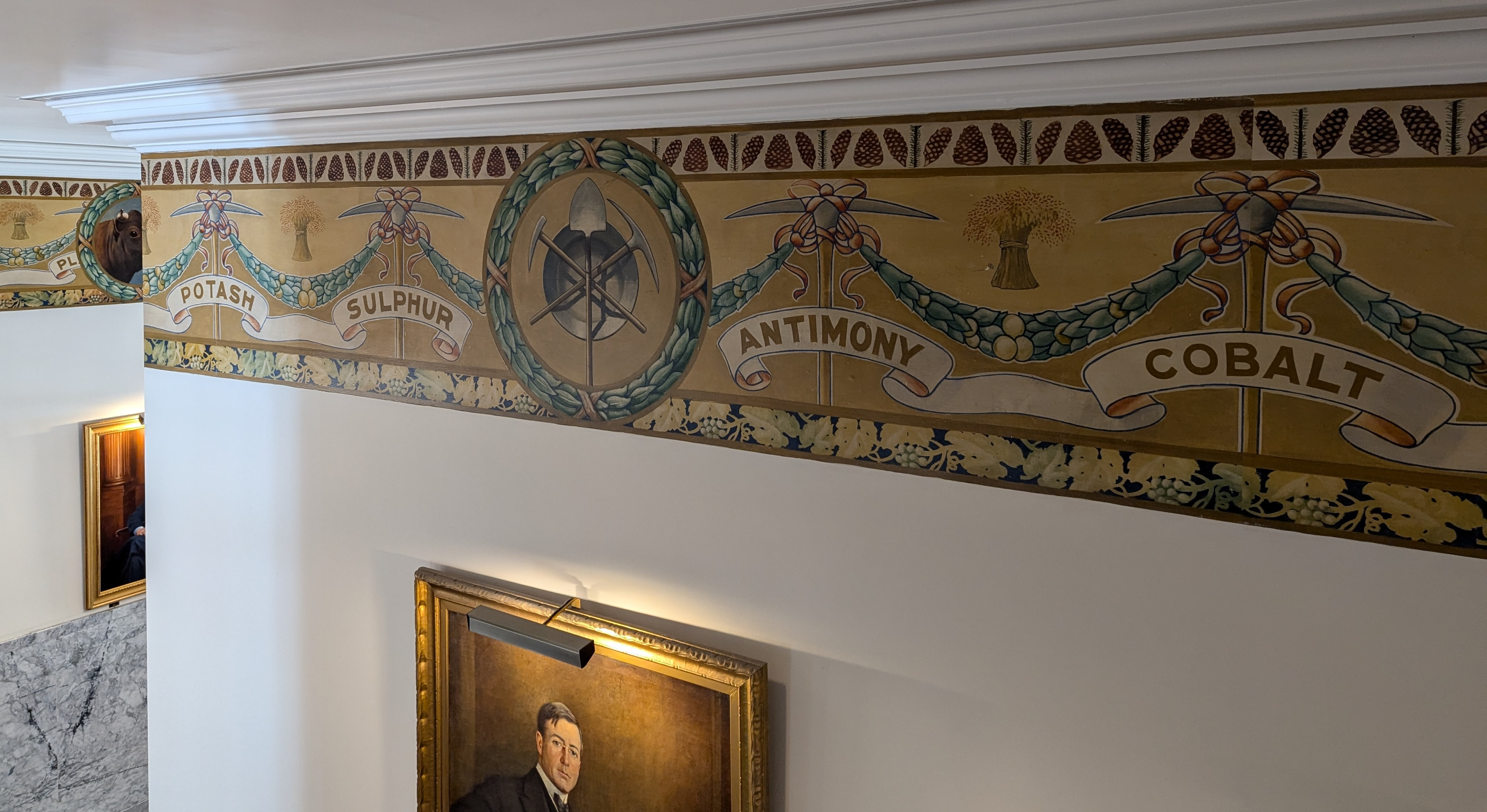
Frieze showing mineral names and mining equipment

A painted frieze in hallways of the first floor celebrates industry in Nevada, listing agricultural products and minerals found in Nevada mines. A vault door in the office of the Secretary of State of Nevada is painted with a scene of Lake Tahoe. Portraits of all governors of Nevada hang throughout the building.

Near the office of the Nevada Commission for Women, a display named Silver State Sisters documents about 100 individuals (mostly women) who have contributed to Nevada history — such as Barbara Vucanovich, Bernice Mathews, and Wild Horse Annie — and groups of women, such as the first non-segregated showgirls at the Moulin Rouge Hotel.

Artifacts of Nevada history on display include Paiute crafts and a section of the rope used to hang the man convicted of the murder of folk heroine Julia Bulette.

== Usage ==
For more than 50 years, all three parts of the state government were housed in the Capitol. The Supreme Court met here until 1937, when it relocated into an adjacent building, and the Nevada Legislature met here until 1971, when it relocated to its new Legislative Building just south of the Capitol. Every Nevada governor except the first has had his office in the capitol. Nowadays, the Capitol continues to serve the Governor, and contains historical exhibits on the second floor.

== Gallery ==
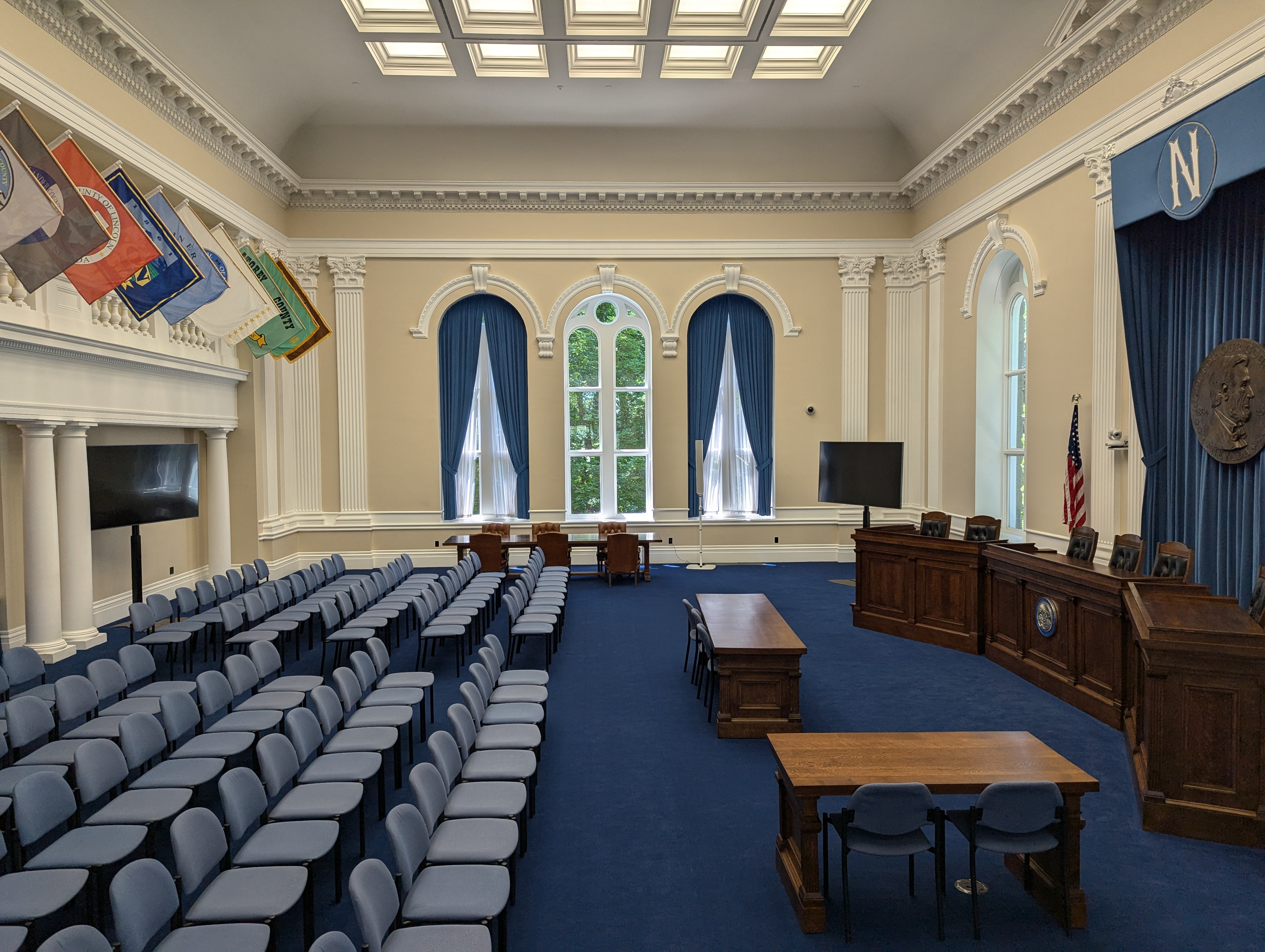
The old Nevada Assembly chamber

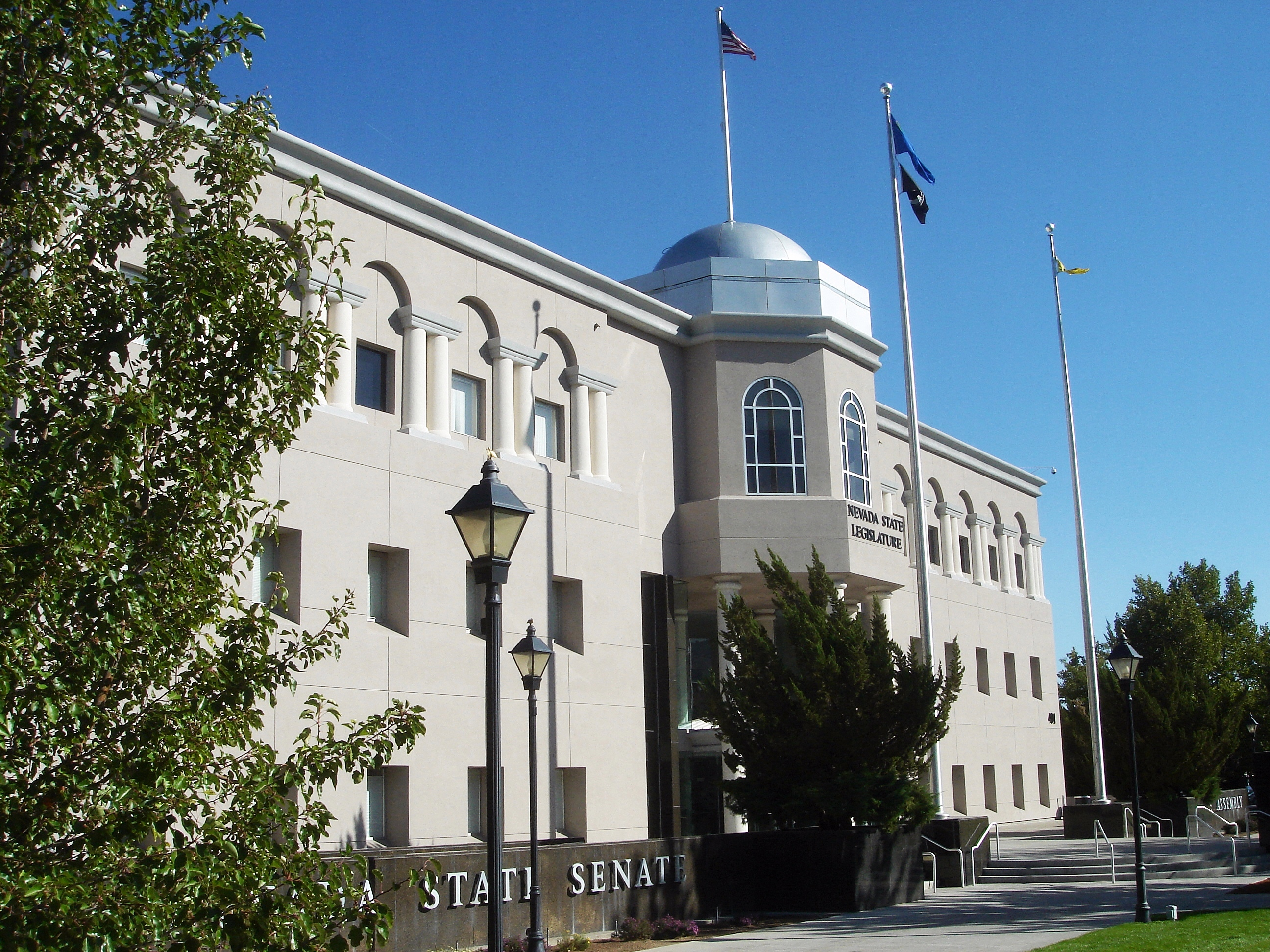
Legislative Building

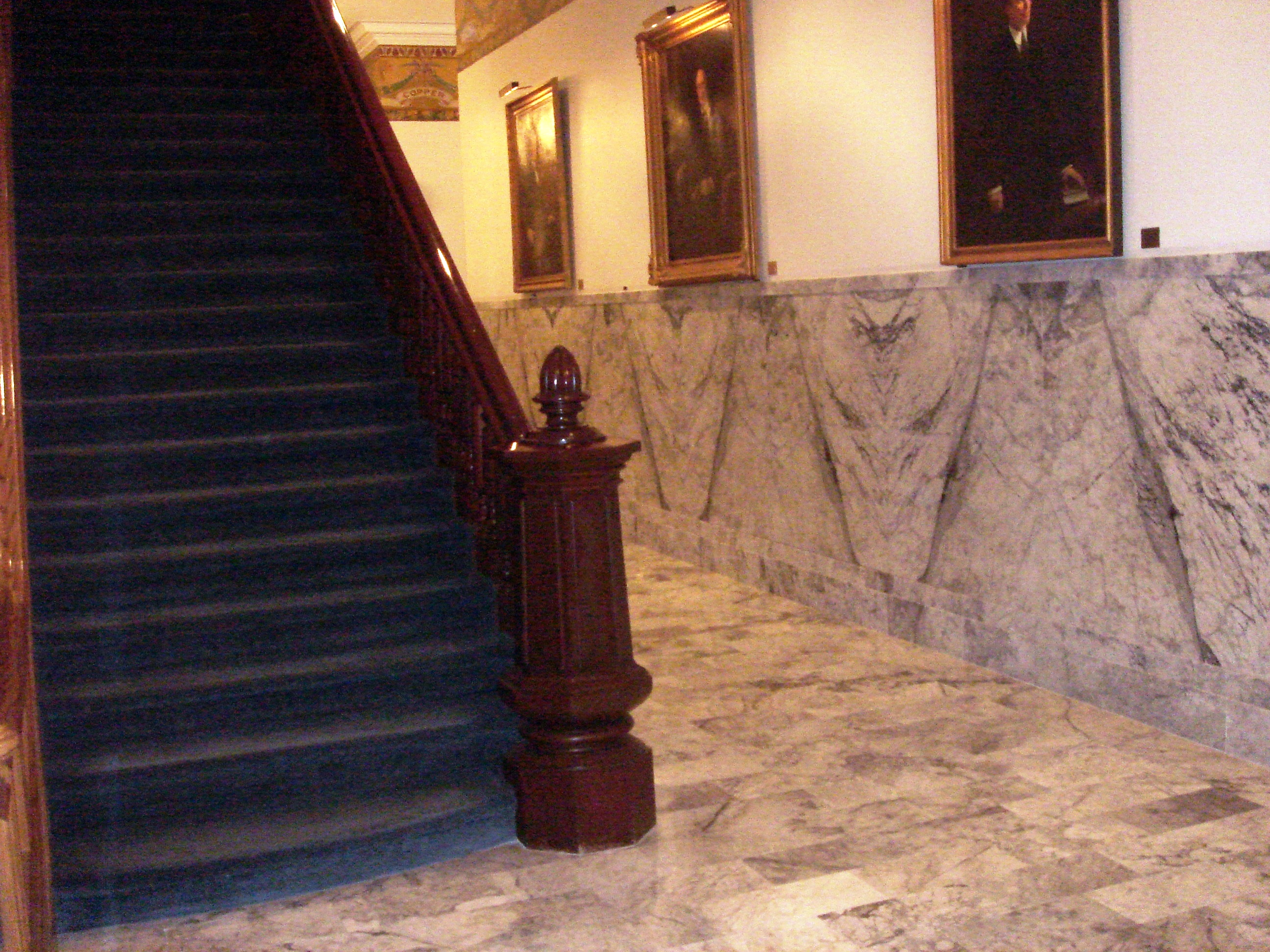
Interior, showing marble floor and wainscotting

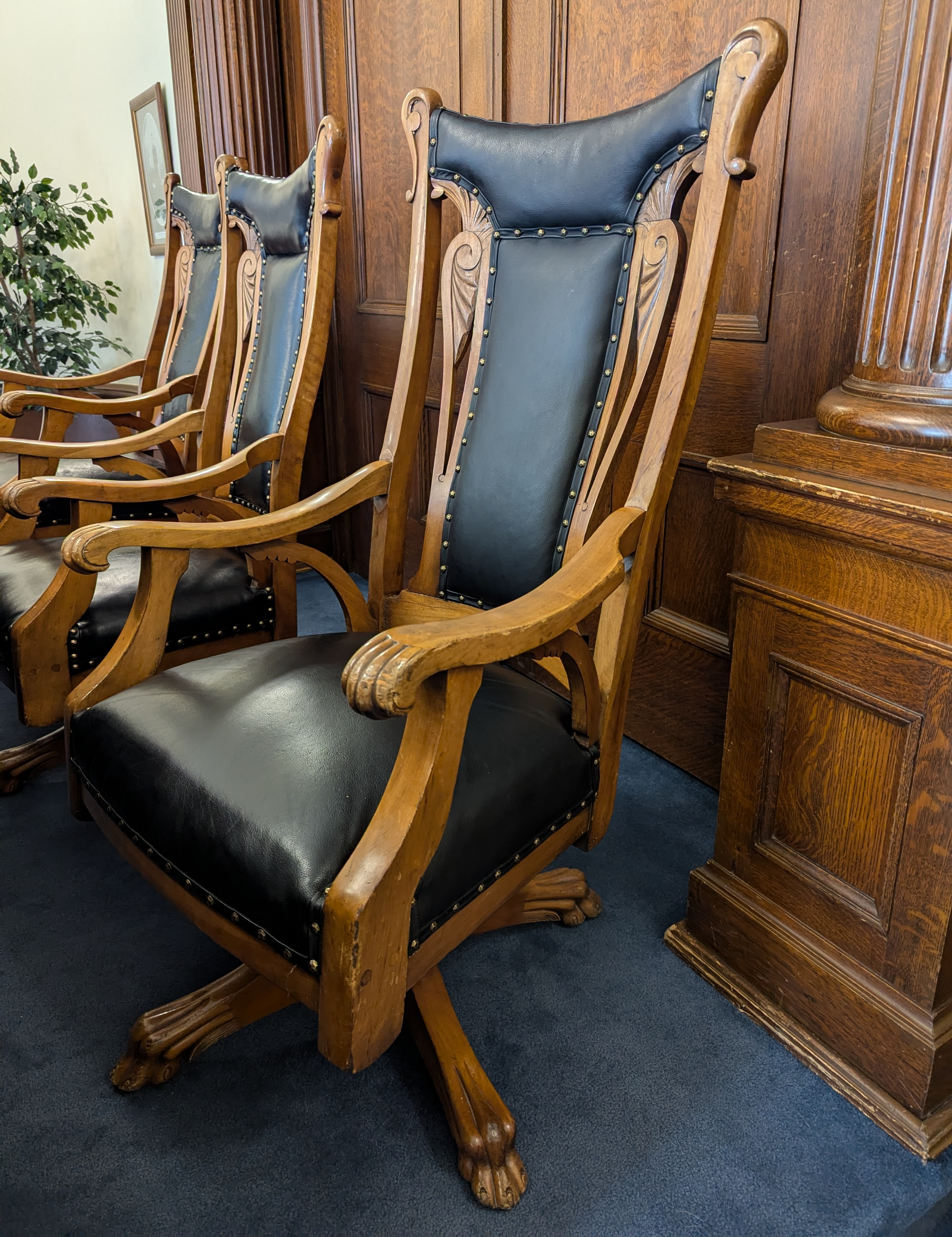
Chairs in the old Nevada Supreme Court chamber

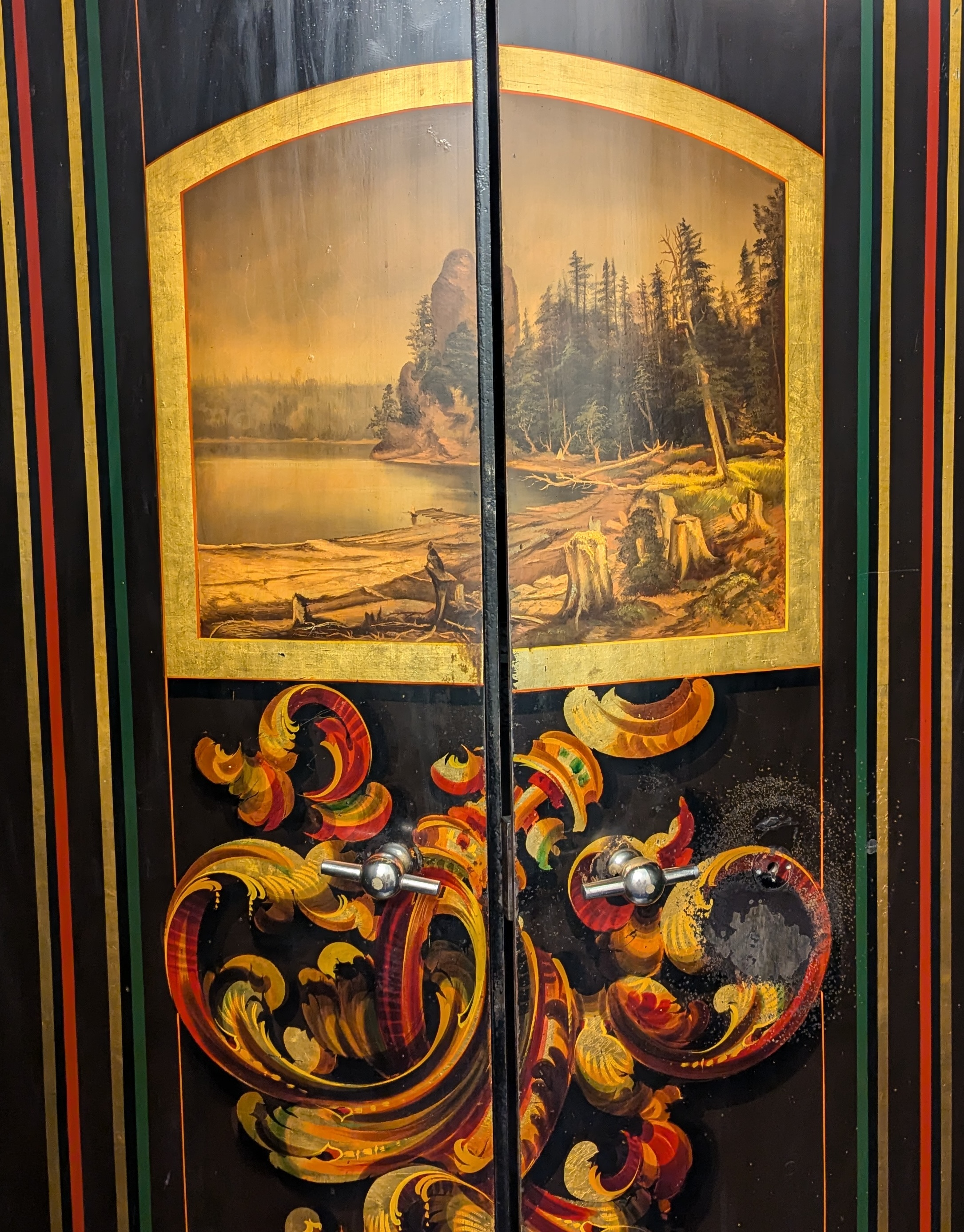
Vault doors with a scene of Cave Rock at Lake Tahoe

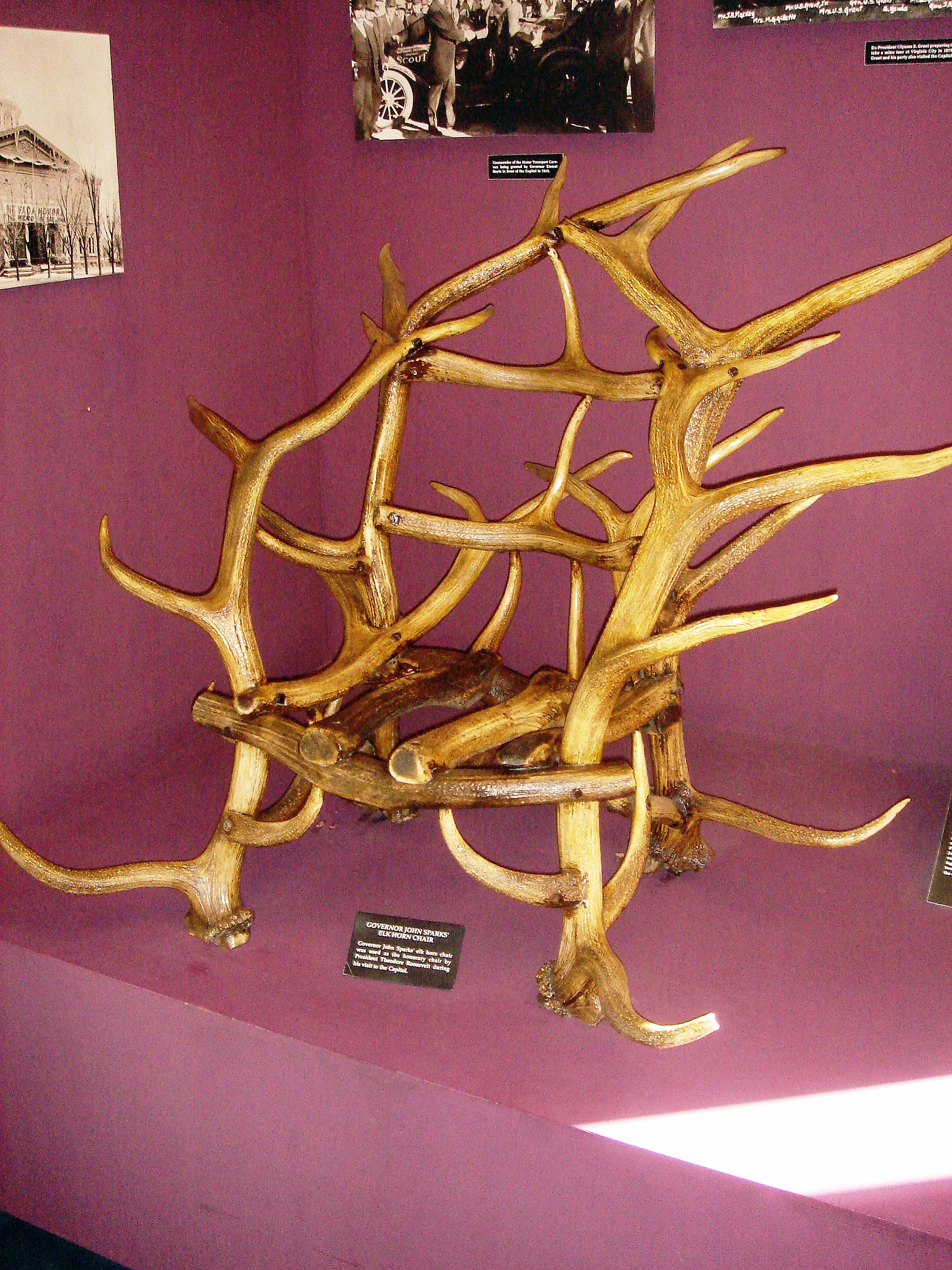
Elk horn chair

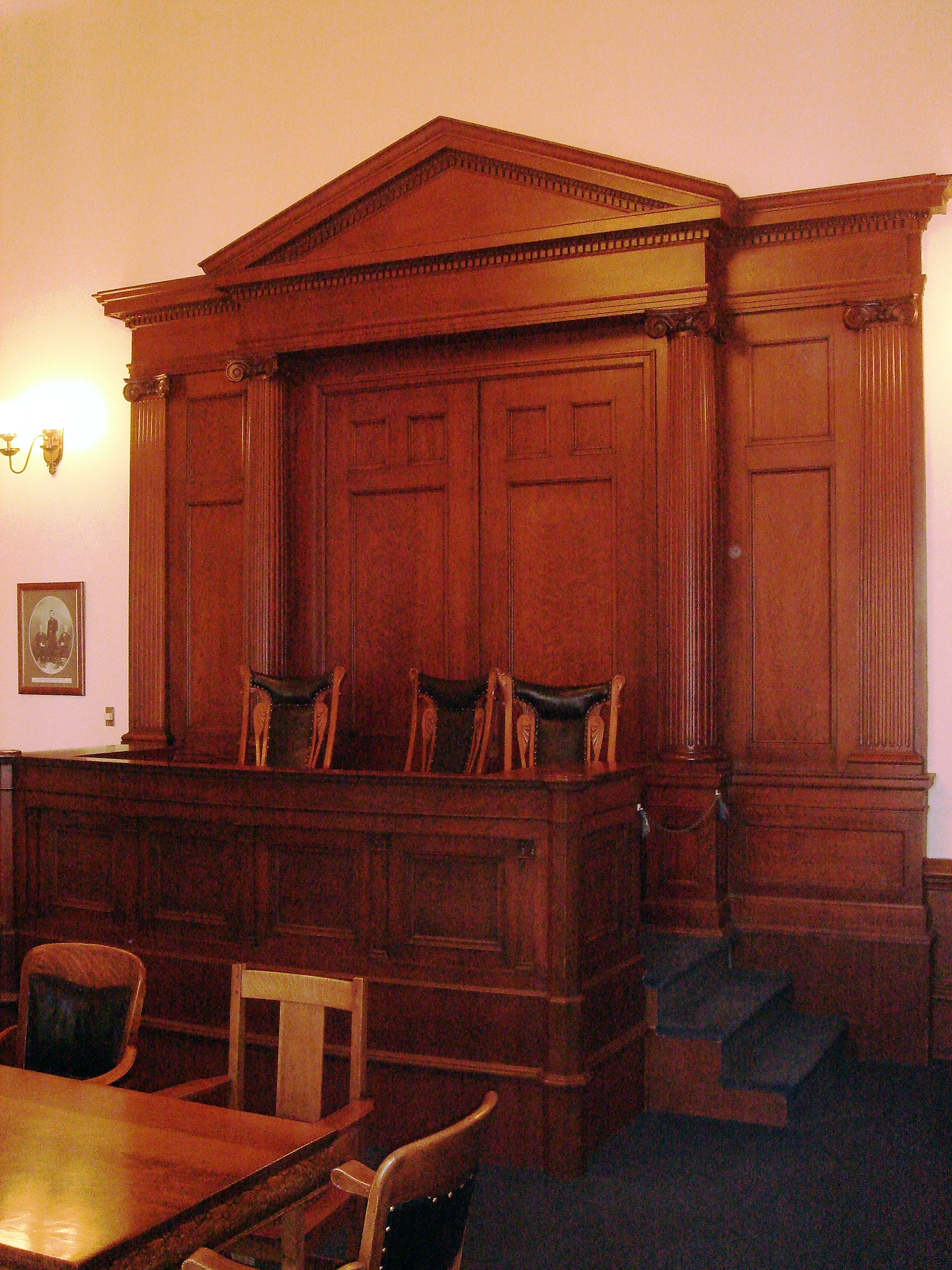
Original Supreme Court room

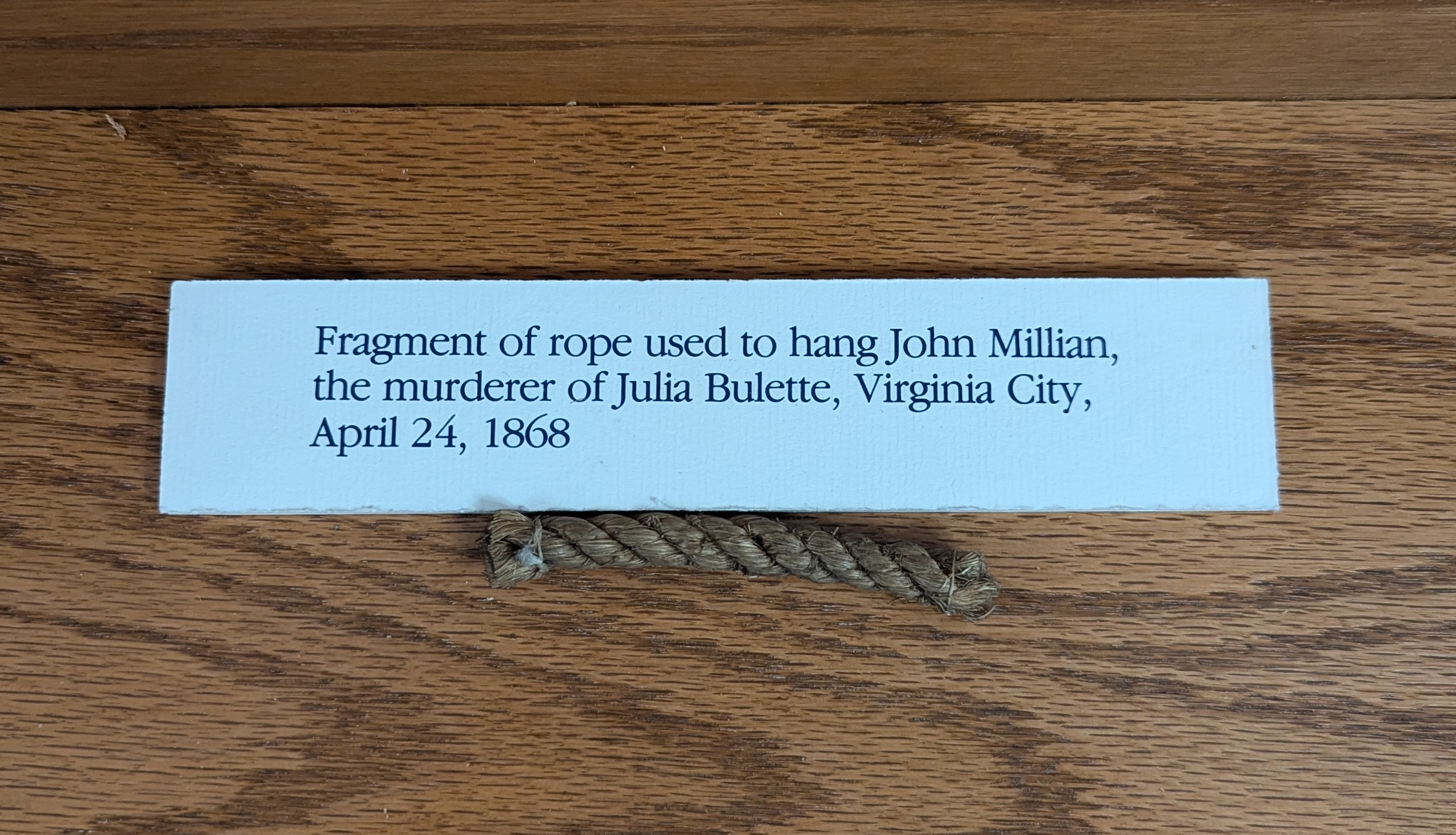
Rope used to hang John Millain, convicted of killing Julia Bulette

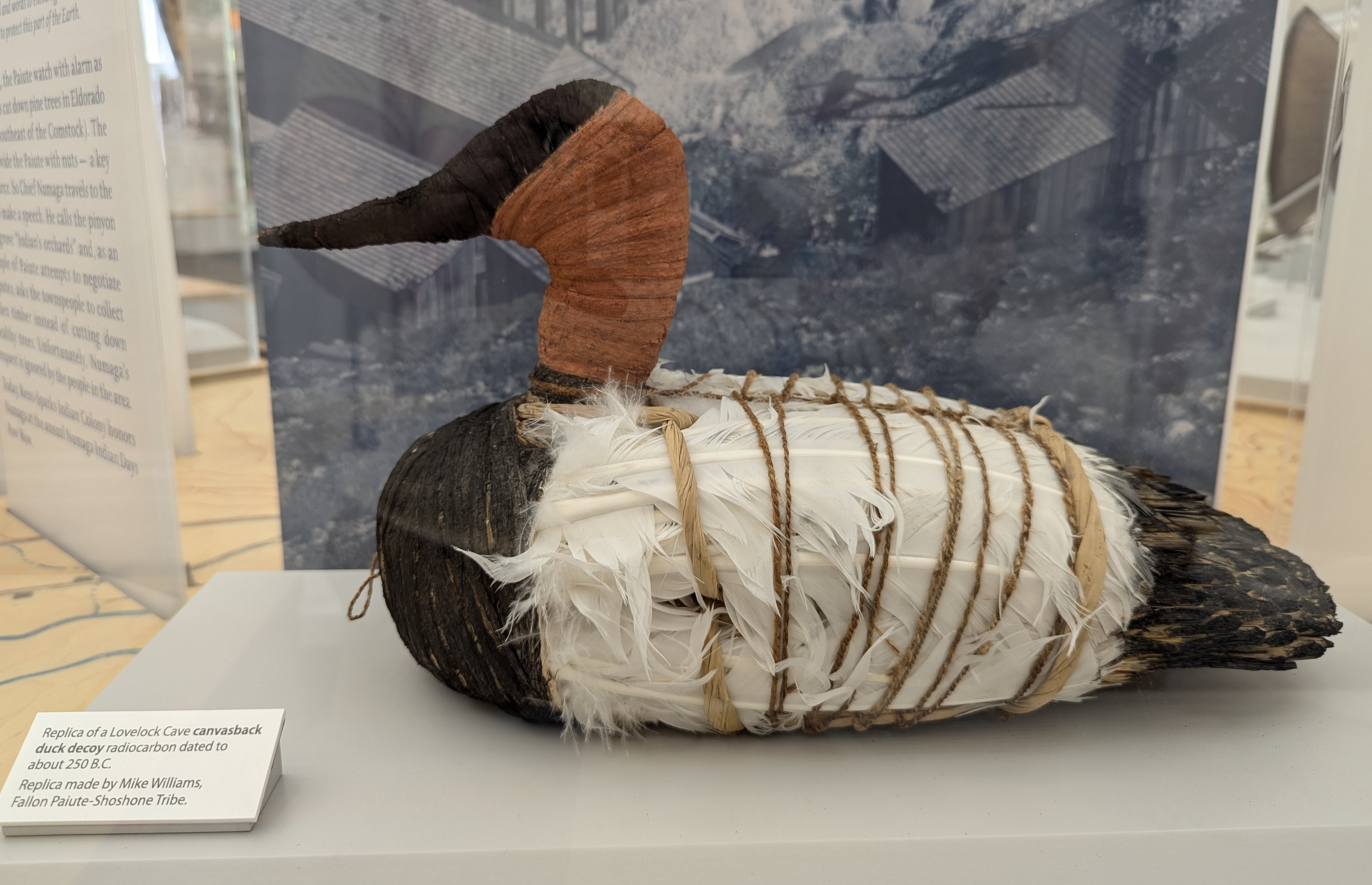
Replica of a canvasback duck decoy dating from 250 B.C., created by Mike Williams, Fallon Paiute-Shoshone Tribe

== See also ==
- List of Nevada state legislatures
- List of state and territorial capitols in the United States
