= Joseph Gosling =

American architect

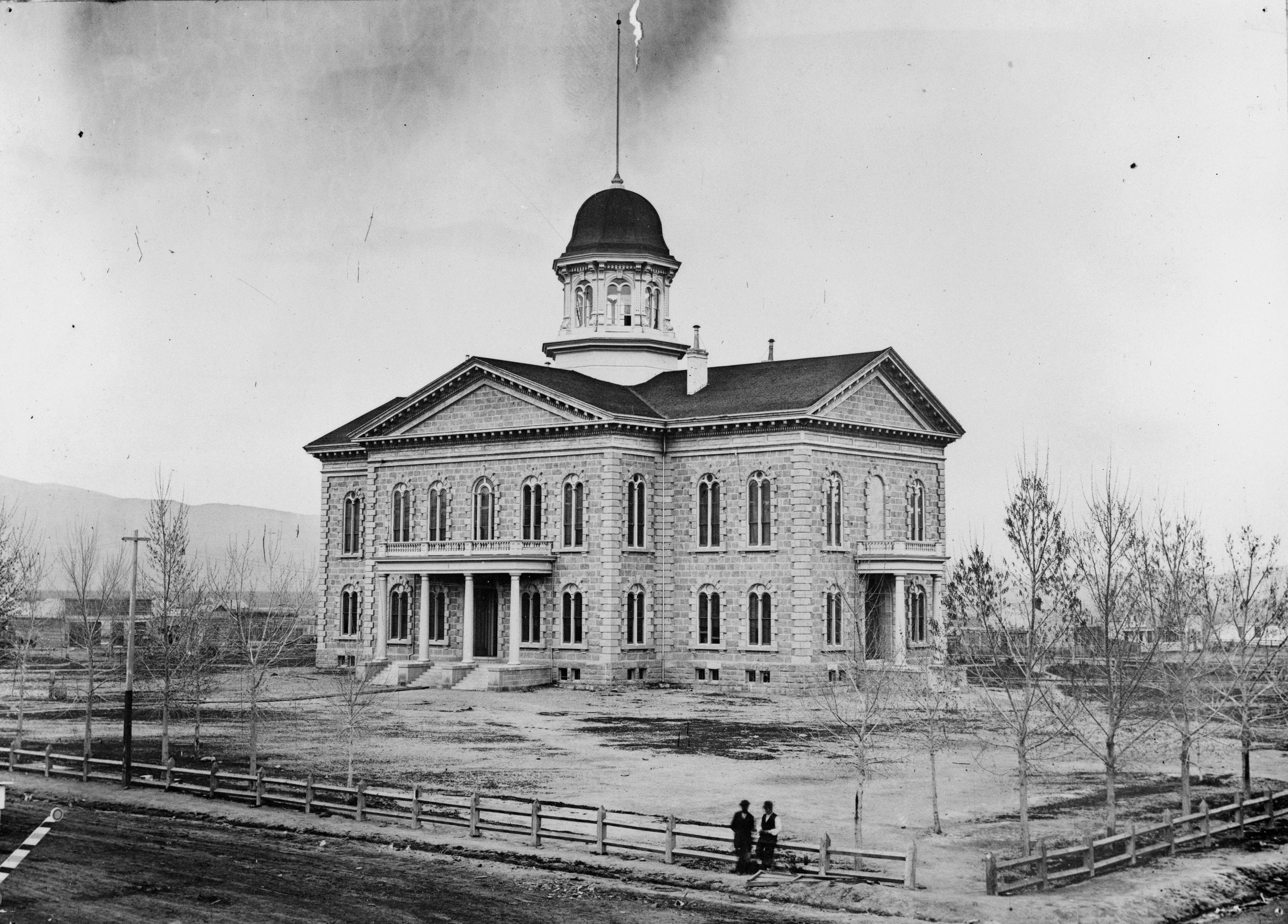
Nevada State Capitol

Joseph Gosling was an architect in San Francisco. He is credited with designing the Nevada State Capitol. He also designed the Frank G. Edwards House in San Francisco. It is listed on the National Register of Historic Places. He had an office at 9 Post Street in San Francisco. He also designed Turk Street School.

Before moving to San Francisco he worked as a carpenter in Virginia City, Nevada.

His plan for Nevada's capitol was a two-story building in the shape of a Grecian cross.

He submitted architectural plans for the Napa State Insane Asylum (Napa State Hospital) in 1870. He and Eusebius Joseph Molera (November 14, 1846 - January 14, 1932) were elected to become members of the San Francisco chapter of the American Institute of Architects in 1882.

Joseph Gosling was born in Philadelphia, PA on 21 October 1818 and died in San Francisco on 31 July 1885, was interred at the Masonic Cemetery in there Pioneers Plot in San Francisco now Defunct He married Harriet Stokum ( O'Neal ) in San Francisco on 1 April 1868

== Work ==
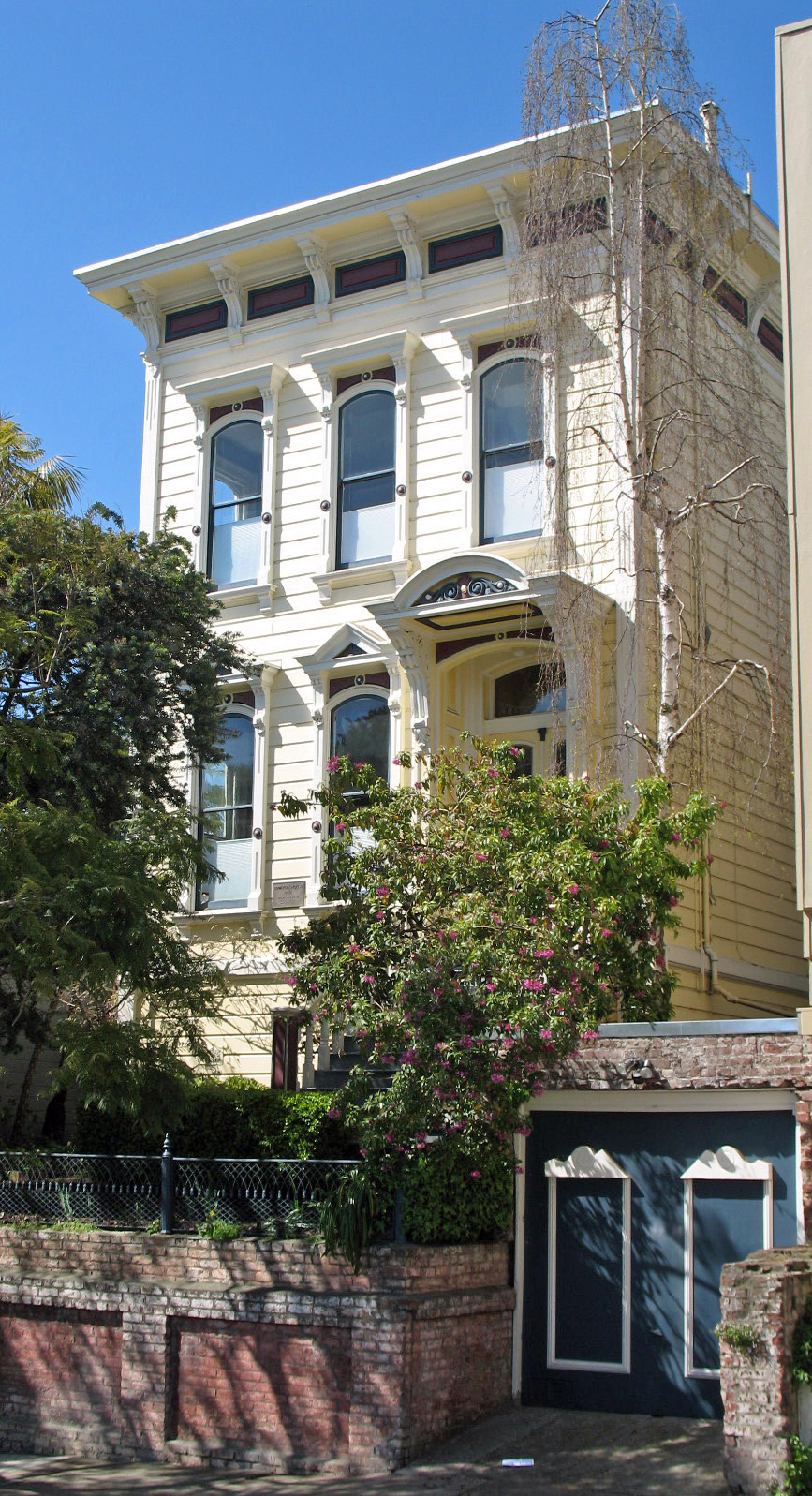
Frank G. Edwards House

- Nevada State Capitol (1871)
- Turk Street School
- Frank G. Edwards House (1883)
