= Tyrone Thompson (politician) =

American politician (1967–2019)

Member of the Nevada Assembly from the 17th district
- In office April 16, 2013 – May 4, 2019
- Preceded by: Steven Brooks
- Succeeded by: Kasina Douglass-Boone

Personal details
- Born: Odis Tyrone Thompson; September 30, 1967 North Las Vegas, Nevada, U.S.
- Died: May 4, 2019 (aged 51) Carson City, Nevada, U.S.
- Party: Democratic
- Education: Northern Arizona University; University of Phoenix
- Website: www.tthompson4nevada.com

Odis Tyrone Thompson (September 30, 1967 – May 4, 2019) was an American politician and a Democratic member of the Nevada Assembly, serving since being appointed on April 16, 2013. Thompson was previously a coordinator of homeless services for Southern Nevada Regional Planning Coalition. He died in office in 2019 at the age of 51.
