= Miguel Dávila (American politician) =

Venezuelan-born American politician

Member of the Nevada Assembly from the 15th district
- Incumbent
- Assumed office November 4, 2026
- Preceded by: Howard Watts III

Personal details
- Party: Democratic

Miguel Dávila is a Venezuelan-born American politician. A member of the Democratic Party, he is the member-elect for the 15th district of the Nevada State Assembly.
