= Brittney Miller =

American politician

Member of the Nevada Assembly from the 5th district
- Incumbent
- Assumed office November 9, 2016
- Preceded by: Kyle James Stephens

Personal details
- Born: 1974 (age 51–52) Detroit, Michigan, U.S.
- Party: Democratic

Brittney Marie Miller (born 1974) is a Democratic member of the Nevada Assembly. She represents the 5th district, which covers parts of the western Las Vegas Valley.

== Biography ==
Miller was born in 1974 in Detroit, to an African-American Detroit police sergeant and a Lebanese civilian U.S. Army employee. She received her bachelor's degree from Saginaw Valley State University, master's degree in public administration from Oakland University, and Master of Arts in teaching from Sierra Nevada College. Miller previously taught at Canarelli Middle School in the Clark County School District.

Miller was elected to the Assembly in 2016, prevailing in a 3-way Democratic primary and winning a close general election. She was supported by Our Revolution. and endorsed by the Clark County Black Caucus.

== Political positions ==
Miller supports expanding background checks for gun purchases.

== Electoral history ==
Nevada Assembly District 5 Democratic primary, 2016
Party	Candidate	Votes	%
Democratic	Brittney Miller	975	44.79
Democratic	Rory Martinez	898	41.25
Democratic	Shannon Churchwell	304	13.96
Total votes		2,177	100.00

Nevada Assembly District 5 election, 2016
Party	Candidate	Votes	%
Democratic	Brittney Miller	12,666	50.71
Republican	Art Ham	12,311	49.29
Total votes		24,977	100.00
