= Selena Torres =

American politician

Member of the Nevada Assembly from the 3rd district
- Incumbent
- Assumed office 2019
- Preceded by: Nelson Araujo

Personal details
- Born: 1995 (age 30–31) Las Vegas, Nevada, U.S.
- Party: Democratic
- Occupation: High School Teacher

Selena Torres is an American politician. She is a Democrat representing the 3rd district in the Nevada State Assembly. While continuing her career as a high school teacher in the city of Las Vegas.

== Education ==
Torres holds an A.A. in Spanish from the College of Southern Nevada and a B.A. in English Literature from the University of Nevada at Reno. She has an M.Ed. from the University of Nevada at Las Vegas.

== Teaching Career ==
Torres currently works as a High School teacher and is a member of the Nevada Education Association. Her parents taught her certain values such as education and hard work and the importance of giving back to her community. Those are the values that motivated Torres to become a teacher and help serve Nevada as a state legislature.

== Background Information ==
Selena Torres's father fled the Salvadorian War and her mother left to Hawaii to become an English teacher. Her parents played a huge impact on Selena's motivation on becoming a public school teacher and serving Nevada.

== Political career ==
In 2018, Torres ran for election to represent District 3 in the Nevada State Assembly, replacing Nelson Araujo, who was leaving the seat to run for Secretary of State. She won with 66.5% of the vote. Selena Torres served as one of the second youngest lawmakers to serve in the legislature.

Torres sits on the following Assembly committees:

- Education
- Judiciary
- Legislative Operations and Elections

== Electoral record ==
2018 general election: Nevada State Assembly, District 3
Party	Candidate	Votes	%
Democratic	Selena Torres	10,138	66.5%
Republican	Stephen Sedlmeyer	5,113	33.5%
