= Howard Watts III =

American politician

Howard Watts

Member of the Nevada Assembly from the 15th district
- Incumbent
- Assumed office 2019
- Succeeded by: Miguel Dávila

Personal details
- Born: December 14, 1987 (age 38) Las Vegas, Nevada, U.S.
- Party: Democratic
- Spouse: Leora
- Education: University of Nevada, Las Vegas (BA)
- Website: wattsfornevada.com

Howard Watts III (born December 14, 1987) is an American politician serving as a member of the Nevada Assembly from the 15th district. Elected in 2018, he assumed office in 2019.

== Early life and education ==
Watts was born in Las Vegas, Nevada in 1987. He earned a Bachelor of Arts degree in political science from the University of Nevada, Las Vegas in 2011.

== Career ==
In 2018, Watts ran for election to represent the 15th district in the Nevada Assembly to replace Elliot Anderson, who was not seeking re-election. He won a five-way Democratic primary with 45.7% of the vote, and won the general election with 66.5% of the vote.

Watts served as chair of the Assembly Natural Resources Committee from 2021 to 2023. He authored legislation supported by animal welfare groups and Nevada egg producers to prohibit the sale of eggs from chickens confined in battery cage facilities. The legislation was signed by Governor Steve Sisolak in June 2021.

=== Tenure ===
Watts sits on the following Assembly committees:

- Growth and Infrastructure
- Judiciary
- Natural Resources, Agriculture, and Mining

Watts is running for re-election in 2020, and will face Burke Andersson in the Democratic primary.

== Electoral record ==
2018 Democratic primary election: Nevada State Assembly, District 15
Party	Candidate	Votes	%
Democratic	Howard Watts III	1,275	45.7%
Democratic	Juan Manuel Chavez	875	31.4%
Democratic	Lou Toomin	236	8.5%
Democratic	Andrew Spivak	215	7.7%
Democratic	Michael Gandy	188	6.7%

2018 general election: Nevada State Assembly, District 15
Party	Candidate	Votes	%
Democratic	Howard Watts III	9,347	66.5%
Republican	Stan Vaughan	4,719	33.5%
