= 2018 Nevada State Controller election =

- November 6, 2018

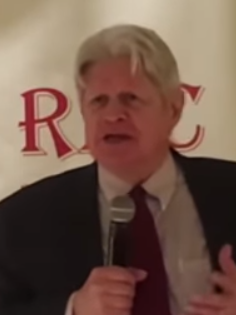
Nominee	Catherine Byrne	Ron Knecht
Party	Democratic	Republican
Popular vote	487,068	445,099
Percentage	50.60%	46.24%
- County results Byrne: 40–50% 50–60% Knecht: 50–60% 60–70% 70–80% 80–90%
State Controller before election
Ron Knecht
Republican
Elected State Controller
Catherine Byrne
Democratic

The 2018 Nevada State Controller election was held on November 6, 2018, to elect the Nevada State Controller, concurrently with elections to the United States Senate, U.S. House of Representatives, governor, and other state and local elections. Primary elections were held on June 12, 2018, though both the Republican and Democratic nominees ran uncontested.

Incumbent Republican state controller Ron Knecht ran for re-election to a second term in office, but lost re-election to Democratic public accountant Catherine Byrne. Knecht was the only incumbent statewide executive Republican to lose re-election in 2018, as all other Republicans either won re-election, resigned, or were term-limited. (Note: Republican U.S. Senator Dean Heller also lost re-election to congresswoman Jacky Rosen. Secretary of State Barbara Cegavske narrowly won re-election.)

== Republican primary ==
Incumbent Republican state controller Ron Knecht was uncontested in the Republican primary, so no primary election was held.

=== Candidates ===
==== Nominee ====
- Ron Knecht, incumbent state controller (2015–present)

== Democratic primary ==
=== Candidates ===
==== Nominee ====
- Catherine Byrne, certified public accountant

==== Declined ====
- Andrew Martin, state assemblyman from the 9th district (2013–2015) and nominee for state controller in 2014

== General election ==
=== Endorsements ===
Ron Knecht (R)

Newspapers and other media

- Las Vegas Review-Journal
Catherine Byrne (D)

Statewide officials

- Kate Marshall, former state treasurer (2007–2015), nominee for Nevada's 2nd congressional district in 2011 and nominee for lieutenant governor in 2018
- Kim Wallin, former state controller (2007–2015)

Newspapers and other media

- Las Vegas Sun

Organizations

- Libertarian Party of Nevada

=== Results ===
2018 Nevada State Controller election
Party	Candidate	Votes	%
Democratic	Catherine Byrne	487,068	50.60
Republican	Ron Knecht (incumbent)	445,099	46.24
None of These Candidates		30,500	3.16
Total votes		962,667	100.00
Democratic gain from Republican			
