= Nevada Democratic Party =

Nevada affiliate of the Democratic Party

Nevada State Democratic Party
- Chairperson: Daniele Monroe-Moreno
- Senate Majority Leader: Nicole Cannizzaro
- Speaker of the Nevada Assembly: Steve Yeager
- Headquarters: 2320 Paseo del Prado; Las Vegas, Nevada
- Membership (October 2025): ▼663,222
- National affiliation: Democratic Party
- Colors: Blue
- Statewide Executive Offices: 3 / 6
- Nevada Senate: 13 / 21
- Nevada Assembly: 28 / 42
- United States Senate: 2 / 2
- United States House of Representatives: 3 / 4

Election symbol

Website
- www.nvdems.com

The Nevada State Democratic Party is the affiliate of the Democratic Party in the U.S. state of Nevada. It has been chaired by Daniele Monroe-Moreno since March 2023.

It is currently the state's favored party, controlling all but one of Nevada's four United States House of Representatives seats, both United States Senate seats, three out of six statewide offices, and both houses of the Nevada Legislature. However, the party does not control the statewide offices of the Governor of Nevada, Lieutenant governor of Nevada, and Nevada State Controller, which are currently held by the Nevada Republican Party Joe Lombardo, Stavros Anthony, and Andy Matthews, respectively.

== History ==
The state of Nevada has had 22 political parties over the years. Only six of these parties lasted up until the 2004 elections. The Democratic Party and the Republican Party remain as the top two in the state.

With the help of Abraham Lincoln in 1864, Nevada became the 36th state in America. Lincoln's Republican influence was considerable among the Nevada state citizens during his presidency. The first two general elections in Nevada, held in 1864 and 1867, were dominated by the Republican Party. In 1871, the Democratic Party started to gain momentum and won four of the six constitutional offices: governor, lieutenant governor, state treasurer and attorney general.

Towards the beginning of the 1900s, the Silver Party was formed, bringing many Republicans and Democrats together from the western states. The party was so-named because of the federal government's shortage of silver coins in 1873. The Silver Party played a prominent role in Nevada's politics in the 1894 and 1898 elections. The Silver Party later formed the Silver Democratic Party. The Silver Democratic Party was prominent in Nevada until the election of 1906. After the election of 1906, the Democratic and Republican parties became the two primary parties in Nevada.

During the Great Depression of 1929, the two primary parties split many constitutional and federal offices. After the Great Depression, the citizens of Nevada preferred the Democratic Party over the Republican Party. Democrats were well received by Nevada and won most of the statewide and federal races from 1932 until 1995.

=== March 2021 staffing incident ===
In March 2021, The Intercept reported on a five-year intra-party conflict in the Nevada Democratic Party, waged between supporters of former Senate Majority Leader Harry Reid and members of the party's progressive wing since the 2016 Democratic presidential primaries. Following sweeping gains of leadership positions by progressive candidates backed by the local Democratic Socialists of America chapter on March 6, the entire Nevada Democratic Party staff resigned, taking severance for themselves and diverting the rest of the party's coffers to the reelection of Senator Catherine Cortez Masto. On March 4, 2023, a "unity" slate of candidates were elected, ending the era of DSA dominance.

== Platform and structure ==
The current platform for the party was ratified in 2020. The topics that are covered include the military, veterans, healthcare, civil rights, education, elections and government, voting rights, environment and energy, foreign policy, jobs and the economy, and working Nevadans.

A priority for Nevada Democrats in the 2010s and 2020s has been increasing the minimum wage. In 2019, Democratic governor Steve Sisolak signed a bill passed by a Democratic legislature to raise Nevada's minimum wage to $12 an hour.

The party has a formal set of by-laws that form the party structure. These by-laws contain nine articles with many sections in each article.

=== Executive Board ===
- Chair: Daniele Monroe-Moreno
- 1st Vice-Chair: Daniel Corena
- 2nd Vice-Chair: Francisco Morales
- Secretary: Travis Brock
- Treasurer: Leilani Hinyard

=== National Committee Representatives ===
- National Committeeman: Alex Goff
- National Committeewoman: Allison Stephens

== Current Democratic officeholders ==
The Nevada Democratic Party controls three of the state's six statewide offices, a majority in the Nevada Senate, and a majority in the Nevada Assembly. Democrats also hold both of the state's U.S. Senate seats and three of the state's four U.S. House of Representatives seats.

=== Members of Congress ===
==== U.S. Senate ====
Democrats have controlled both of Nevada's seats in the U.S. Senate since 2018:

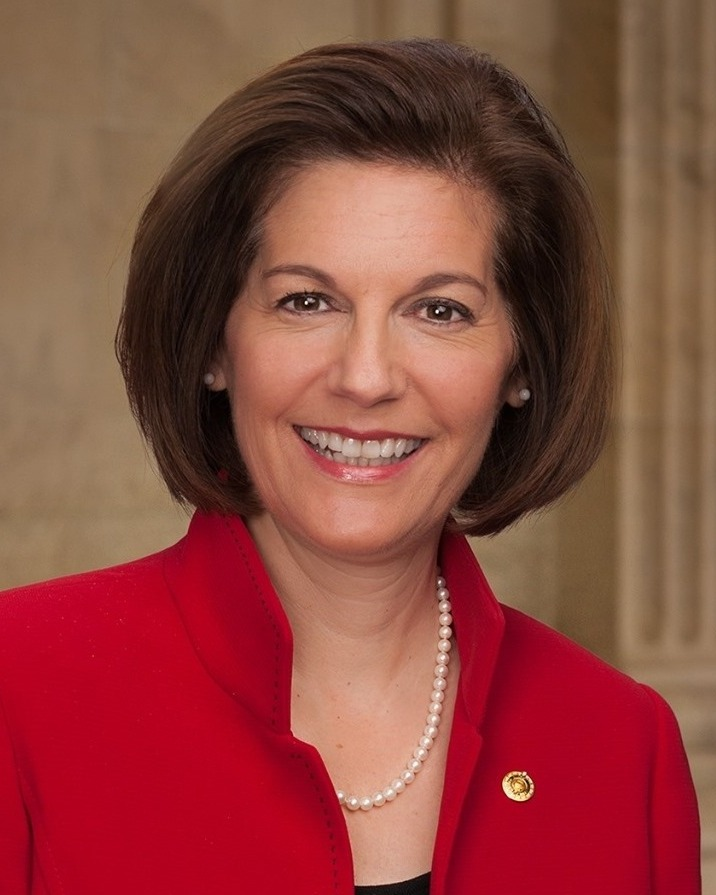
Senior U.S. Senator Catherine Cortez Masto

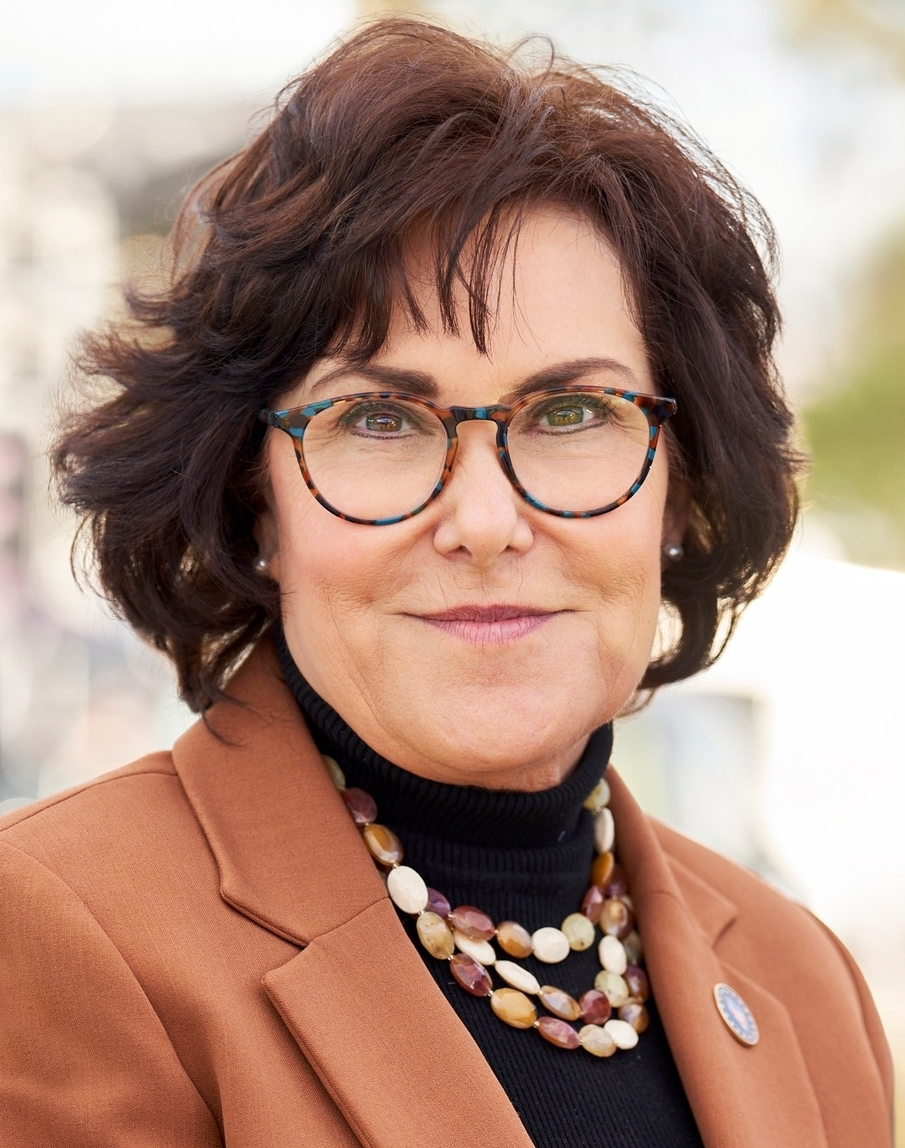
Junior U.S. Senator Jacky Rosen

==== U.S. House of Representatives ====
Out of the four seats Nevada is apportioned in the U.S. House of Representatives, three are held by Democrats:

District	Member	Photo
1st	Dina Titus	
2nd	Teresa Benitez-Thompson (elect)	
3rd	Susie Lee	
4th	Steven Horsford	

=== Statewide offices ===
Democrats control three of the six elected statewide offices:

Photo	Office	Officeholder
	Attorney General → Governor-elect	Aaron Ford
	Lieutenant Governor-elect	Sandra Jauregui
	Attorney General-elect	Nicole Cannizzaro
	State Treasurer	Zach Conine
	State Treasurer-elect	Tya Mathis-Coleman
	Secretary of State	Cisco Aguilar
	Controller-elect	Michael MacDougall

=== State legislature ===
- Senate Majority Leader: Nicole Cannizzaro
- Senate President Pro Tempore: Mo Denis
- Assistant Senate Majority Leader: Joyce Woodhouse
- Senate Chief Majority Whip: Pat Spearman
- Senate Co-Majority Whips: Chris Brooks and Marilyn Dondero Loop
- Speaker of Nevada Assembly: Jason Frierson
- Speaker Pro Tempore of Nevada Assembly: Steve Yeager
- Assembly Majority Floor Leader: Teresa Benitez-Thompson
- Assembly Assistant Majority Floor Leader: Daniele Monroe-Moreno
- Assembly Majority Whip: Edgar Flores
- Assembly Assistant Majority Whip: Sandra Jauregui

=== Mayoral offices ===
Most of the state's major cities have Democratic mayors:

- Las Vegas (1): Shelley Berkley
- Reno (2): Kate Marshall
- North Las Vegas (3): Pamela Goynes-Brown

== Local groups ==
The party has affiliate groups in localities throughout the state:

- Carson City Democrats
- Churchill County Nevada Democratic Party
- Clark County Nevada Democratic Party
- Douglas County Democrats
- Elko County Democrats
- Esmeralda County Democrats
- Eureka County Democrats
- Humboldt County Democrats
- Lander County Democrats
- Lincoln County Democrats
- Lyon County Democrats
- Mineral County Democrats
- Nye County Democrats
- Pershing County Democrats
- Storey County Democrats
- Washoe County Democrats
- White Pine County Democrats

=== County chairs ===
- Carson City: Lewis Hardy
- Churchill County: Larry Jackson
- Clark County: Ashley Lovell
- Douglas County: Donna Weidner
- Elko County, Nevada: Steve Anderson
- Esmeralda County: Vacant
- Eureka County: Vacant
- Lander County: Claudio Cardoza
- Humboldt County: Vacant
- Lincoln County: Vacant
- Lyon County: Tony Stephenson
- Mineral County: Béa Whitney
- Nye County: Kelly Fitzpatrick
- Pershing County: Vacant
- Storey County: Vacant
- Washoe County: Sarah Mahler
- White Pine County: Vacant

== Election results ==
=== Federal ===
==== Presidential ====
Nevada Democratic Party presidential election results
Election	Presidential ticket	Votes	Vote %	Electoral votes	Result
1864	George B. McClellan/George H. Pendleton	6,594	40.16%	0 / 2	Lost
1868	Horatio Seymour/Francis Preston Blair Jr.	5,218	44.61%	0 / 3	Lost
1872	Horace Greeley/Benjamin G. Brown (Liberal Republican)	6,236	42.57%	0 / 3	Lost
1876	Samuel J. Tilden/Thomas A. Hendricks	9,308	47.27%	0 / 3	Lost
1880	Winfield S. Hancock/William H. English	9,613	52.40%	3 / 3	Lost
1884	Grover Cleveland/Thomas A. Hendricks	5,578	43.59%	0 / 3	Won
1888	Grover Cleveland/Allen G. Thurman	5,149	41.94%	0 / 3	Lost
1892	Grover Cleveland/Adlai E. Stevenson	714	6.56%	0 / 3	Won
1896	William Jennings Bryan/Arthur Sewall	8,376	81.21%	3 / 3	Lost
1900	William Jennings Bryan/Adlai E. Stevenson	6,347	62.25%	3 / 3	Lost
1904	Alton B. Parker/Henry G. Davis	3,982	32.87%	0 / 3	Lost
1908	William Jennings Bryan/John W. Kern	11,212	45.71%	3 / 3	Lost
1912	Woodrow Wilson/Thomas R. Marshall	7,986	39.70%	3 / 3	Won
1916	Woodrow Wilson/Thomas R. Marshall	17,776	53.36%	3 / 3	Won
1920	James M. Cox/Franklin D. Roosevelt	9,851	36.22%	0 / 3	Lost
1924	John W. Davis/Charles W. Bryan	5,909	21.95%	0 / 3	Lost
1928	Al Smith/Joseph T. Robinson	14,090	43.46%	0 / 3	Lost
1932	Franklin D. Roosevelt/John N. Garner	28,756	69.41%	3 / 3	Won
1936	Franklin D. Roosevelt/John N. Garner	31,925	72.81%	3 / 3	Won
1940	Franklin D. Roosevelt/Henry A. Wallace	31,945	60.08%	3 / 3	Won
1944	Franklin D. Roosevelt/Harry S. Truman	29,623	54.62%	3 / 3	Won
1948	Harry S. Truman/Alben W. Barkley	31,291	50.37%	3 / 3	Won
1952	Adlai Stevenson/John Sparkman	31,688	38.55%	0 / 3	Lost
1956	Adlai Stevenson/Estes Kefauver	40,640	42.03%	0 / 3	Lost
1960	John F. Kennedy/Lyndon B. Johnson	54,880	51.16%	3 / 3	Won
1964	Lyndon B. Johnson/Hubert Humphrey	79,339	58.58%	3 / 3	Won
1968	Hubert Humphrey/Edmund Muskie	60,598	39.29%	0 / 3	Lost
1972	George McGovern/Sargent Shriver	66,016	36.32%	0 / 3	Lost
1976	Jimmy Carter/Walter Mondale	92,479	45.81%	0 / 3	Won
1980	Jimmy Carter/Walter Mondale	66,666	26.89%	0 / 3	Lost
1984	Walter Mondale/Geraldine Ferraro	91,655	31.97%	0 / 4	Lost
1988	Michael Dukakis/Lloyd Bentsen	132,738	37.92%	0 / 4	Lost
1992	Bill Clinton/Al Gore	189,148	37.36%	4 / 4	Won
1996	Bill Clinton/Al Gore	203,974	43.93%	4 / 4	Won
2000	Al Gore/Joe Lieberman	279,978	45.98%	0 / 4	Lost
2004	John Kerry/John Edwards	397,190	47.88%	0 / 5	Lost
2008	Barack Obama/Joe Biden	533,736	55.15%	5 / 5	Won
2012	Barack Obama/Joe Biden	531,373	52.36%	6 / 6	Won
2016	Hillary Clinton/Tim Kaine	539,260	47.92%	6 / 6	Lost
2020	Joe Biden/Kamala Harris	703,486	50.06%	6 / 6	Won
2024	Kamala Harris/Tim Walz	705,197	47.49%	0 / 6	Lost

==== U.S. Senate ====
Class 1
Year	Candidate	Votes	%	Result
1970	Howard Cannon	85,187	57.65%	Won ✓
1976	Howard Cannon	127,214	63.01%	Won ✓
1982	Howard Cannon	114,720	47.74%	Lost ✗
1988	Richard Bryan	175,548	50.21%	Won ✓
1994	Richard Bryan	193,804	50.93%	Won ✓
2000	Ed Bernstein	238,260	39.69%	Lost ✗
2006	Jack Carter	238,796	40.99%	Lost ✗
2012	Shelley Berkley	446,080	44.71%	Lost ✗
2018	Jacky Rosen	490,071	50.41%	Won ✓
2024	Jacky Rosen	701,105	47.87%	Won ✓

Class 3
Year	Candidate	Votes	%	Result
1968	Alan Bible	83,622	54.76%	Won ✓
1974	Harry Reid	78,981	40.60%	Lost ✗
1980	Mary Gojack	92,129	37.38%	Lost ✗
1986	Harry Reid	130,955	50.00%	Won ✓
1992	Harry Reid	253,150	51.05%	Won ✓
1998	Harry Reid	208,621	47.86%	Won ✓
2004	Harry Reid	494,805	61.08%	Won ✓
2010	Harry Reid	362,785	50.29%	Won ✓
2016	Catherine Cortez Masto	521,994	47.10%	Won ✓
2022	Catherine Cortez Masto	498,316	48.81%	Won ✓

==== U.S. House ====
Election	Votes	%	Seats (NV)	±	%
2016	508,113	47.11	3 / 4	▲2	19.58
2018	491,272	51.13	3 / 4	0	4.02
2020	665,526	49.09	3 / 4	0	2.04
2022	480,774	47.62	3 / 4	0	1.47
2024	534,115	37.43	3 / 4	0	10.19
2026	621,724	57.01	4 / 4	▲1	19.58

=== State ===
==== Executive offices ====
Governor
Year	Candidate	Votes	Vote %	Result
1864				
1870	Lewis R. Bradley			Won ✓
1874				
1878				
1882	Jewett W. Adams	7,770	54.32%	Won ✓
1886	Jewett W. Adams	5,869	47.59%	Lost ✗
1890	Theodore Winters	5,791	46.73%	Lost ✗
1894	Theodore Winters	678	6.47%	Lost ✗
1898	George Russell	2,057	20.55%	Lost ✗
1902	Endorsed John Sparks (Silver)	N/A	N/A	Did not run
1906	Endorsed John Sparks (Silver)	N/A	N/A	Did not run
1910	Denver S. Dickerson	8,798	42.66%	Lost ✗
1914	Emmet D. Boyle	9,623	44.65%	Won ✓
1918	Emmet D. Boyle	12,875	52.08%	Won ✓
1922	James G. Scrugham	15,437	53.88%	Won ✓
1926	James G. Scrugham	14,521	47.00%	Lost ✗
1930	Charles L. Richards	16,192	46.75%	Lost ✗
1934	Richard Kirman Sr.	23,088	53.94%	Won ✓
1938	Edward P. Carville	28,528	61.86%	Won ✓
1942	Edward P. Carville	24,505	60.26%	Won ✓
1946	Vail Pittman	28,655	57.42%	Won ✓
1950	Vail Pittman	26,164	42.36%	Lost ✗
1954	Vail Pittman	36,797	46.90%	Lost ✗
1958	Grant Sawyer	50,864	59.92%	Won ✓
1962	Grant Sawyer	64,784	66.84%	Won ✓
1966	Grant Sawyer	65,870	47.84%	Lost ✗
1970	Mike O'Callaghan	70,697	48.10%	Won ✓
1974	Mike O'Callaghan	114,114	67.38%	Won ✓
1978	Robert E. Rose	76,361	39.68%	Lost ✗
1982	Richard Bryan	128,132	53.30%	Won ✓
1986	Richard Bryan	187,268	71.92%	Won ✓
1990	Bob Miller	207,878	64.81%	Won ✓
1994	Bob Miller	200,026	52.68%	Won ✓
1998	Jan Laverty Jones	182,281	42.04%	Lost ✗
2002	Joe Neal	110,935	22.01%	Lost ✗
2006	Dina Titus	255,684	43.92%	Lost ✗
2010	Rory Reid	298,171	41.61%	Lost ✗
2014	Bob Goodman	130,722	23.88%	Lost ✗
2018	Steve Sisolak	480,007	49.39%	Won ✓
2022	Steve Sisolak	481,991	47.30%	Lost ✗
2026	Aaron Ford	562,812	51.53%	Won ✓

Lieutenant Governor
Year	Candidate	Votes	%	Result
2014	Lucy Flores	183,571	33.65%	Lost ✗
2018	Kate Marshall	486,381	50.35%	Won ✓
2022	Lisa Cano Burkhead	463,871	45.75%	Lost ✗
2026	Sandra Jauregui	555,522	54.3%	Won ✓

Attorney General
Year	Candidate	Votes	%	Result
2014	Ross Miller	246,629	45.32%	Lost ✗
2018	Aaron Ford	456,225	47.24%	Won ✓
2022	Aaron Ford	511,263	52.25%	Won ✓
2026	Nicole Cannizzaro	607,424	56.4%	Won ✓

Secretary of State
Year	Candidate	Votes	%	Result
2014	Kate Marshall	250,612	46.14%	Lost ✗
2018	Nelson Araujo	461,551	48.25%	Lost ✗
2022	Cisco Aguilar	496,569	48.95%	Won ✓
2026	Cisco Aguilar	616,096	57.0%	Won ✓
