= Ron Knecht =

American politician

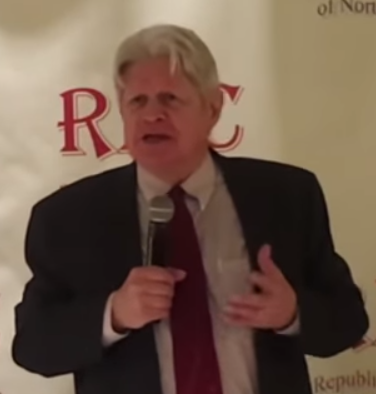

21st Controller of Nevada
- In office January 5, 2015 – January 7, 2019
- Governor: Brian Sandoval
- Preceded by: Kim Wallin
- Succeeded by: Catherine Byrne

Personal details
- Born: Ronald Lee Knecht; May 4, 1949 (age 76) Belleville, Illinois U.S.
- Party: Republican
- Spouse: Kathryn Knecht
- Children: 1
- Education: University of Illinois, Urbana-Champaign (BA); Stanford University (MS); University of San Francisco (JD)
- Website: Official website

Ronald Lee Knecht (born May 4, 1949) is an American attorney, businessman and politician. He is a member of the Republican Party.

Knecht ran for State Controller of Nevada in the 2014 election and defeated Democrat Andrew Martin. He lost re-election in 2018 to Democrat Catherine Byrne. He was one of six Republicans running for statewide office or US Senator who was defeated.

== Electoral history ==
Republican primary results
Party	Candidate	Votes	%
Republican	Ron Knecht	56,497	52.57
Republican	Barry Herr	20,820	19.37
None of These Candidates		15,423	14.35
Republican	Cort Arlint	14,736	13.71
Total votes		107,476	100

Nevada State Controller election, 2014
Party	Candidate	Votes	%	±%
Republican	Ron Knecht	282,843	52.53	+9.93
Democratic	Andrew Martin	202,606	37.63	−9.87
Independent American	Tom Jones	29,126	5.41	+0.61
None of These Candidates		23,825	4.43	-0.67
Total votes		53,840	100	
Republican gain from Democratic		Swing	+19.81	

2018 Nevada State Controller election
Party	Candidate	Votes	%	±%
Democratic	Catherine Byrne	487,068	50.60	+12.96
Republican	Ron Knecht (incumbent)	445,099	46.24	–6.29
None of These Candidates		30,500	3.17	–1.25
Total votes		962,667	100.0	
Democratic gain from Republican				

Political offices
Preceded by Kim Wallin	Controller of Nevada; 2015–2019	Succeeded by Catherine Byrne
