= 2014 Nevada lieutenant gubernatorial election =

- November 4, 2014
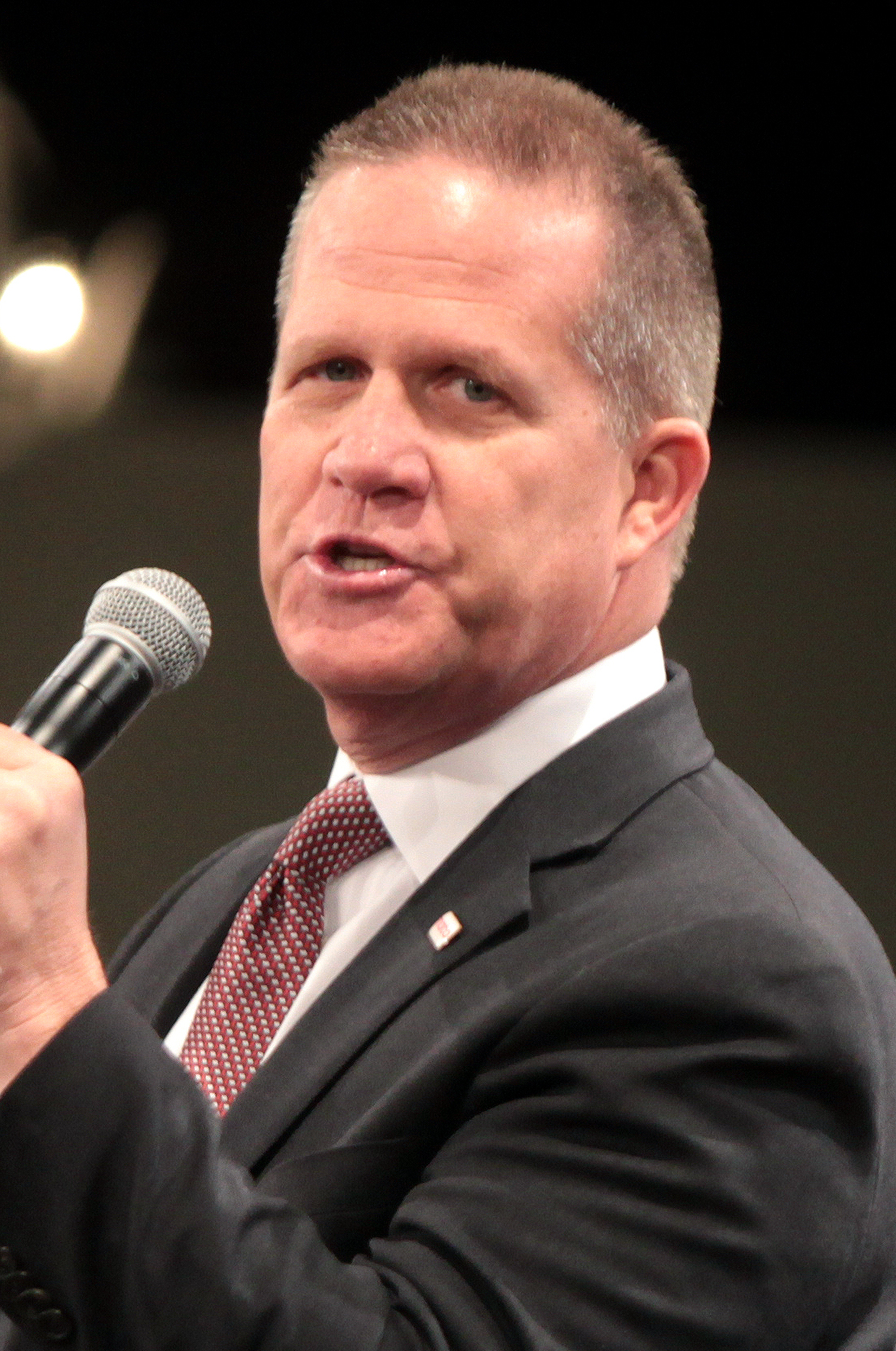

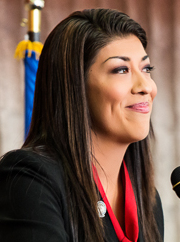
Candidate	Mark Hutchison	Lucy Flores
Party	Republican	Democratic
Popular vote	324,443	183,571
Percentage	59.47%	33.65%
- County results Hutchison: 50–60% 60–70% 70–80%
Lieutenant Governor before election
Brian Krolicki
Republican
Elected Lieutenant Governor
Mark Hutchison
Republican

The 2014 Nevada lieutenant gubernatorial election was held on November 4, 2014, to elect the Lieutenant Governor of Nevada, concurrently with elections to the United States House of Representatives, governor, and other state and local elections. Primary elections were held on June 10, 2014. Two debates were held, one in September 2014 and the other in October.

Incumbent Republican lieutenant governor Brian Krolicki was ineligible to run for re-election to a third term in office due to lifetime term limits. Republican state senator Mark Hutchison defeated Democratic state assemblywoman Lucy Flores in a landslide. As of 2025, this, alongside all other concurrent statewide elections except for attorney general, is the last time any Republican candidate won Clark County in a statewide election.

== Republican primary ==
=== Candidates ===
==== Nominee ====
- Mark Hutchison, state senator from the 6th district

==== Eliminated in primary ====
- Chris Dyer, electrician
- Sue Lowden, former chairwoman of the Nevada Republican Party (2007–2009) and state senator from the 3rd district (1993–1997)

==== Considered but did not run ====
- Bob Beers, state senator from the 6th district (2004–2008) and state assemblyman from the 4th district (1998–2004)

=== Polling ===
Poll source	Date(s) administered	Sample size	Margin of error	Mark Hutchison	Sue Lowden	Undecided
Precision Research	March 3–5, 2014	443 (LV)	± 4.66%	32%	46%	22%

=== Results ===
Republican primary results
Party	Candidate	Votes	%
Republican	Mark Hutchison	62,939	53.76%
Republican	Sue Lowden	42,290	36.13%
Republican	Chris Dyer	6,824	5.83%
None of These Candidates		5,011	4.28%
Total votes		117,064	100.0%

== Democratic primary ==
=== Candidates ===
==== Nominee ====
- Lucy Flores, state assemblywoman from the 28th district

==== Eliminated in primary ====
- Harley Kulkin, chairman of the Pahrump Town Board, candidate for state assembly in 2006 and candidate for Nye County commissioner in 2004 and 2008

=== Results ===
Democratic primary results
Party	Candidate	Votes	%
Democratic	Lucy Flores	52,324	71.47%
None of These Candidates		11,515	15.73%
Democratic	Harley Kulkin	9,368	12.80%
Total votes		68,839	100.0%

== General election ==
=== Endorsements ===
Mark Hutchison (R)

U.S. governors

- Mitt Romney, former Governor of Massachusetts (2003–2007) and Republican nominee for president in 2012
- Brian Sandoval, incumbent Governor of Nevada and former Nevada Attorney General (2003–2005)

Newspapers and other media

- Las Vegas Review-Journal
- Reno Gazette-Journal

Organizations

- Asian Chamber of Commerce
Lucy Flores (D)

U.S. senators

- Harry Reid, incumbent U.S. senator from Nevada, former U.S. representative from Nevada's 1st congressional district (1983–1987), and former Lieutenant Governor of Nevada (1971–1975)

Newspapers and other media

- Las Vegas Sun

=== Debate ===
2014 Nevada lieutenant gubernatorial debates
No.	Date	Host	Moderator	Link	Republican	Democratic	Independent American
Key: P Participant A Absent N Not invited I Invited W Withdrawn							
Key: P Participant A Absent N Not invited I Invited W Withdrawn					Mark Hutchison	Lucy Flores	Mike Little
1	October 15, 2014	PBS Vegas	Steve Sebelius	YouTube	P	P	N
2	September 3, 2014	Hispanics in Politics	Fernando Romero	N/A	P	P	N

=== Polling ===
Poll source	Date(s) administered	Sample size	Margin of error	Mark Hutchison (R)	Lucy Flores (D)	Other	Undecided
SurveyUSA	September 19–October 1, 2014	569 (LV)	± 4.2%	47%	35%	9% (Note: Mike Little (IAP) with 6% and None of These Candidates with 3%)	9%
Precision Research	March 3–5, 2014	216 (LV)	± 6.67%	41%	34%	–	25%

Hypothetical polling

Sue Lowden vs. Lucy Flores

Poll source	Date(s) administered	Sample size	Margin of error	Sue Lowden (R)	Lucy Flores (D)	Undecided
Precision Research	March 3–5, 2014	216 (LV)	± 6.67%	44%	36%	20%

=== Results ===
2014 Nevada lieutenant gubernatorial election
Party	Candidate	Votes	%	±%
Republican	Mark Hutchison	324,443	59.47%	+8.21%
Democratic	Lucy Flores	183,571	33.65%	−8.22%
Independent American	Mike Little	21,221	3.89%	+0.15%
None of These Candidates		16,298	2.99%	-0.14%
Total votes		545,533	100.0%	
Republican hold				
