= Irene Bustamante Adams =

American politician (born 1968)

Speaker pro tempore of the Nevada Assembly
- In office February 6, 2017 – November 7, 2018
- Preceded by: John Ellison
- Succeeded by: Steve Yeager

Minority Leader of the Nevada Assembly
- In office July 28, 2015 – November 9, 2016
- Preceded by: Pat Hickey
- Succeeded by: Jim Wheeler

Member of the Nevada Assembly from the 42nd district
- In office November 3, 2010 – November 7, 2018
- Preceded by: Harry Mortenson
- Succeeded by: Alexander Assefa

Personal details
- Born: 1968 (age 57–58) Hanford, California, U.S.
- Party: Democratic
- Spouse: Brad Adams
- Children: 2
- Education: California State University, Fresno (BS); University of Nevada, Las Vegas (MBA)
- Website: Official website

Irene Bustamante Adams (born 1968, Hanford, California) is an American politician and a former Democratic member of the Nevada Assembly from 2011 to 2018, representing District 42.

== Education ==
Irene Bustamante earned her BS from California State University, Fresno and her EMBA from University of Nevada, Las Vegas.

She married Brad Adams; the couple has two daughters.

== Elections ==
- 2012: Bustamante Adams won the June 12, 2012 Democratic Primary with 1,073 votes (77.98%), and won the November 6, 2012 General election with 11,182 votes (67.06%) against Republican nominee Robert McEntee.
- 2010: When Democratic Assemblyman Harry Mortenson retired from the Assembly when he was term limited and left the House District 42 seat open, Bustamante Adams won the four-way June 8, 2010 Democratic Primary with 965 votes (64.81%), and won the November 2, 2010 General election with 5,629 votes (63.75%) against Republican nominee Kathryn Njus.

=== Minority Leader ===
Adams served as Minority Leader of the Nevada Assembly from 2015 to 2017.

Nevada Assembly
Preceded by John Ellison	Speaker pro tempore of the Nevada Assembly; 2017–2018	Succeeded by Steve Yeager
