= 2018 Nevada lieutenant gubernatorial election =

- November 6, 2018
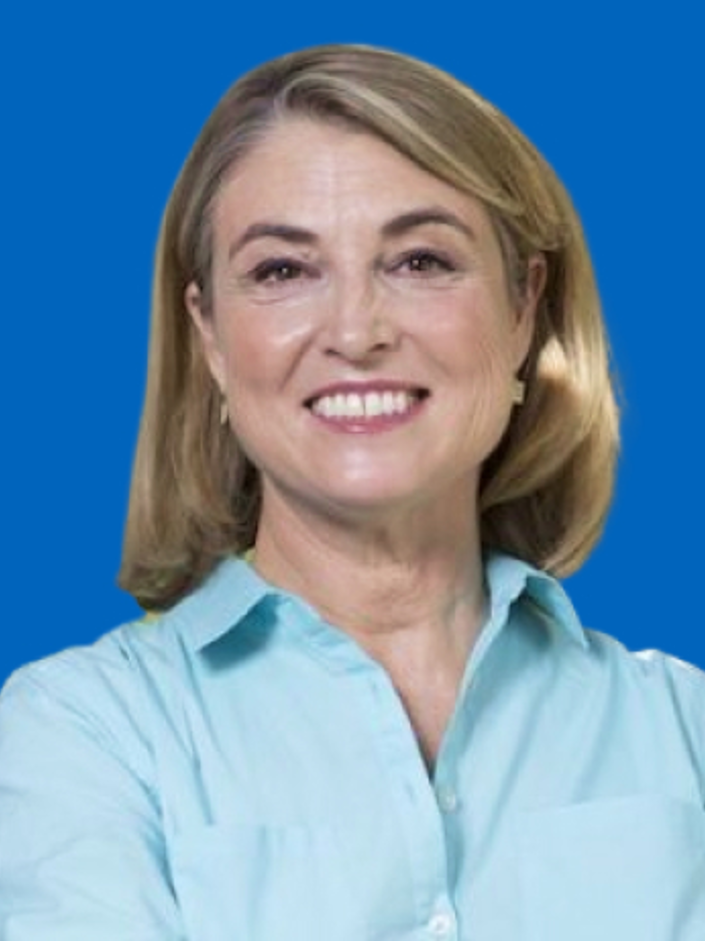

Nominee	Kate Marshall	Michael Roberson
Party	Democratic	Republican
Popular vote	486,381	421,697
Percentage	50.35%	43.66%
- Marshall: 40–50% 50–60% 60–70% 70–80% 80–90% >90% Roberson: 40–50% 50–60% 60–70% 70–80% 80–90% >90% Hansen: >90% Tie: 40–50% 50% No votes
Lieutenant Governor before election
Mark Hutchison
Republican
Elected Lieutenant Governor
Kate Marshall
Democratic

The 2018 Nevada lieutenant gubernatorial election was held on November 6, 2018, to elect the Lieutenant Governor of Nevada, concurrently with elections to the United States Senate, U.S. House of Representatives, governor, and other state and local elections. Primary elections were held on June 12, 2018.

Incumbent Republican lieutenant governor Mark Hutchison was eligible to run for re-election to a second term in office, but announced in August 2017 he would not seek re-election. Former Democratic state treasurer Kate Marshall won the open seat against Senate Minority Leader Michael Roberson.

== Republican primary ==
=== Candidates ===
==== Nominee ====
- Michael Roberson, Minority Leader of the Nevada Senate (2016–present, 2013–2014), former Majority Leader of the Nevada Senate (2014–2016), and state senator from the 20th district (2011–present) and 5th district (2010–2011)

==== Eliminated in primary ====
- Eugene Hoover, businessman
- Brent A. Jones, former assemblyman from the 35th district (2014-2016)
- Gary A. Meyers, businessman
- Scott LaFata

==== Declined ====
- Mark Hutchison, incumbent lieutenant governor (2015–present)

=== Results ===
Republican primary results
Party	Candidate	Votes	%
Republican	Michael Roberson	63,675	46.24
Republican	Brent A. Jones	24,899	18.08
None of These Candidates		17,219	12.49
Republican	Eugene Hoover	15,918	11.56
Republican	Gary A. Meyers	9,153	6.65
Republican	Scott LaFata	6,854	4.98
Total votes		137,718	100.00

== Democratic primary ==
=== Candidates ===
==== Nominee ====
- Kate Marshall, former Nevada State Treasurer (2007–2015), nominee for Secretary of State in 2014, and nominee for Nevada's 2nd congressional district in 2011

==== Eliminated in primary ====
- Laurie Hansen

==== Withdrew before primary ====
- Chip Evans, former chairman of the Washoe County Democratic Party and nominee for Nevada's 2nd congressional district in 2016

==== Declined ====
- Zach Conine, businessman and candidate for state assembly in 2016 (ran for treasurer)
- Ross Miller, former Secretary of State of Nevada (2007–2015) and nominee for attorney general in 2014

=== Results ===
Democratic primary results
Party	Candidate	Votes	%
Democratic	Kate Marshall	93,795	67.27
Democratic	Laurie Hansen	30,709	22.02
None of These Candidates		14,924	10.71
Total votes		139,428	100.00

== General election ==
=== Endorsements ===
Michael Roberson (R)

Statewide officials

- Brian Sandoval, incumbent Governor of Nevada (2011–present) and former Nevada Attorney General (2003–2005)

Organizations

- NRA Political Victory Fund
Kate Marshall (D)

Executive branch officials

- Barack Obama, 44th President of the United States (2009–2017) and former United States Senator from Illinois (2005–2008)

U.S. senators

- Catherine Cortez Masto, incumbent United States Senator from Nevada (2017–present) and former Nevada Attorney General (2007–2015)
- Harry Reid, former Senate Majority Leader (2007–2015), former United States Senator from Nevada (1987–2017), and U.S. representative from Nevada's 1st congressional district (1983–1987)

State senators

- Aaron Ford, Majority Leader of the Nevada Senate (2016–present), Majority Leader of the Nevada Senate (2014–2016), state senator from the 11th district (2013–present), and nominee for attorney general in 2018

State representatives

- Jason Frierson, Speaker of the Nevada Assembly (2017–present) and state assemblyman from the 8th district (2013–present) and 26th district (2011–2013)

U.S. representatives

- Jacky Rosen, U.S. representative from Nevada's 3rd congressional district (2017–present) and nominee for U.S. Senate in 2018
- Dina Titus, U.S. representative from Nevada's 1st congressional district (2013–present) and 3rd district (2009–2011)

Labor unions

- International Brotherhood of Boilermakers, Iron Ship Builders, Blacksmiths, Forgers and Helpers
- United Food and Commercial Workers

=== Polling ===
Poll source	Date(s) administered	Sample size (Note: Key: A – all adults RV – registered voters LV – likely voters V – unclear)	Margin of error	Michael Roberson (R)	Kate Marshall (D)	Other	Undecided
Gravis Marketing	September 11–12, 2018	700 (RV)	±3.7%	35%	45%	—	20%
Suffolk University	September 5–10, 2018	500 (LV)	±4.4%	26%	29%	13%	31%
Gravis Marketing	June 23–26, 2018	630 (RV)	±3.9%	36%	45%	—	19%
The Mellman Group (D)	April 12–19, 2018	600 (V)	±4.0%	27%	40%	—	33%

=== Results ===
2018 Nevada lieutenant gubernatorial election
Party	Candidate	Votes	%	±%
Democratic	Kate Marshall	486,381	50.35	+16.70
Republican	Michael Roberson	421,697	43.66	–15.82
Independent American	Janine Hansen	23,893	2.47	–1.42
None of These Candidates		23,537	2.44	–0.55
Independent	Ed Uehling	10,435	1.08	N/a
Total votes		965,943	100.00	
Democratic gain from Republican		Swing	+16.26	

==== By county ====
2018 Nevada Secretary of State election (by county)
County	Kate Marshall Democratic		Michael Roberson Republican		Various candidates Other parties		Margin		Total votes cast
County	#	%	#	%	#	%	#	%	Total votes cast
Carson City	9,927	43.83%	11,242	49.64%	1,478	6.53%	–1,315	–5.81%	22,647
Churchill	2,338	24.43%	6,385	66.72%	847	8.85%	–4,047	–42.29%	9,570
Clark	350,939	54.17%	260,447	40.20%	36,457	5.63%	90,492	13.97%	647,843
Douglas	8,661	33.41%	15,723	60.65%	1,542	5.94%	–7,062	–27.24%	25,926
Elko	3,109	20.57%	10,552	69.82%	1,452	9.61%	–7,443	–49.25%	15,113
Esmeralda	61	16.49%	258	69.73%	51	13.78%	–197	–53.24%	370
Eureka	90	11.94%	567	75.20%	97	12.86%	–477	–62.34%	754
Humboldt	1,483	26.84%	3,542	64.10%	501	9.06%	–2,059	–37.26%	5,526
Lander	427	20.43%	1,425	68.18%	238	11.39%	–998	–47.75%	2,090
Lincoln	323	16.68%	1,327	68.54%	286	14.78%	–1,004	–51.86%	1,936
Lyon	6,093	29.26%	13,245	63.60%	1,488	7.14%	–7,152	–34.34%	20,826
Mineral	687	38.16%	904	50.22%	209	11.62%	–217	–12.06%	1,800
Nye	4,959	28.45%	10,733	61.57%	1,739	9.98%	–5,774	–33.12%	17,431
Pershing	514	29.27%	1,062	60.48%	180	10.25%	–548	–31.21%	1,756
Storey	818	34.75%	1,351	57.39%	185	7.86%	–533	–22.64%	2,354
Washoe	95,213	50.98%	80,797	43.26%	10,766	5.76%	14,416	7.72%	186,776
White Pine	739	22.91%	2,137	66.26%	349	10.83%	–349	–43.35%	3,225

Counties that flipped from Republican to Democratic

- Clark (largest municipality: Las Vegas)
- Washoe (largest municipality: Reno)

==== By congressional district ====
Marshall won three of four congressional districts.

District	Roberson	Marshall	Representative
1st	31%	62%	Dina Titus
2nd	49%	44%	Mark Amodei
3rd	45%	49%	Jacky Rosen (115th Congress)
3rd	45%	49%	Susie Lee (116th Congress)
4th	43%	51%	Ruben Kihuen (115th Congress)
4th	43%	51%	Steven Horsford (116th Congress)
