= 2014 Nevada Secretary of State election =

- November 4, 2014
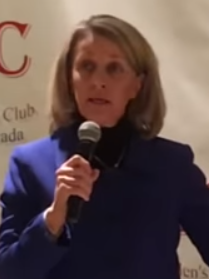

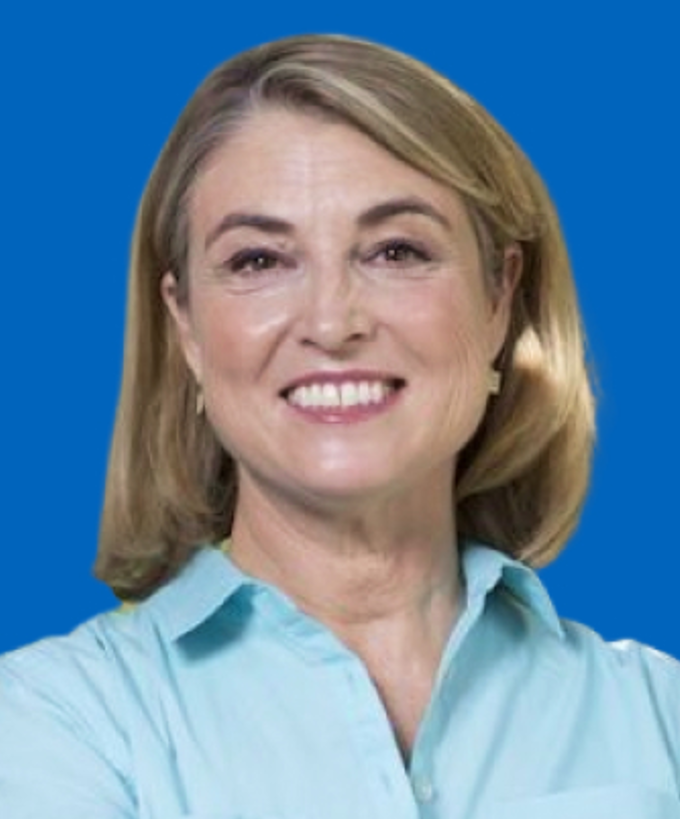
Candidate	Barbara Cegavske	Kate Marshall
Party	Republican	Democratic
Popular vote	273,720	250,612
Percentage	50.40%	46.14%
- County results Cegavske: 40–50% 50–60% 60–70% 70–80% Marshall: 40–50%
Secretary of State before election
Ross Miller
Democratic
Elected Secretary of State
Barbara Cegavske
Republican

The 2014 Nevada Secretary of State election was held on November 4, 2014, to elect the Secretary of State of Nevada, concurrently with elections to the United States House of Representatives, governor, and other state and local elections. Primary elections were held on June 10, 2014, though both major party candidates ran uncontested. A debate was held on October 3, 2014.

Incumbent Democratic secretary of state Ross Miller was term-limited for life and instead ran unsuccessfully for attorney general. Republican state senator Barbara Cegavske defeated incumbent state treasurer Kate Marshall in the general election. As of 2025, this election marks the last time that a Democratic candidate won Mineral County in a statewide election.

== Democratic primary ==
Democratic state treasurer Kate Marshall was the only Democrat to run for Secretary of State in 2014, so the Democratic primary was uncontested.

=== Candidates ===
==== Nominee ====
- Kate Marshall, incumbent state treasurer (2007–present)

== Republican primary ==
A Republican primary was not held for Secretary of State in 2014. Businessman Jordan Bradley originally announced a run in the Republican primary, but withdrew before the official primary, leaving Barbara Cegavske as the uncontested nominee.

=== Candidates ===
==== Nominee ====
- Barbara Cegavske, state senator from the 8th district (2002–present) and former state assemblywoman from the 5th district (1996–2002)

==== Withdrew before primary ====
- Jordan Bradley, businessman

==== Declined ====
- Brian Krolicki, incumbent lieutenant governor (2007–present) and former state treasurer (1999–2007)

== General election ==
=== Endorsements ===
Kate Marshall (D)

Newspapers and other media

- Las Vegas Sun
- Reno Gazette-Journal
Barbara Cegavske (R)

Newspapers and other media

- Las Vegas Review-Journal
- Mesquite Local News

Organizations

- Nevada Republican Party

=== Debate ===
2014 Nevada Secretary of State debate
No.	Date	Host	Moderator	Link	Democratic	Republican
Key: P Participant A Absent N Not invited I Invited W Withdrawn						
Key: P Participant A Absent N Not invited I Invited W Withdrawn					Kate Marshall	Barbara Cegavske
1	October 3, 2014	PBS Vegas	Steve Sebelius; Elizabeth Thompson	YouTube	P	P

=== Polling ===
Poll source	Date(s) administered	Sample size	Margin of error	Kate Marshall (D)	Barbara Cegavske (R)	Other	Undecided
SurveyUSA	September 19–October 1, 2014	569 (LV)	± 4.2%	42%	43%	5% (Note: None of These Candidates with 5%)	10%
Precision Research	March 3–5, 2014	216 (LV)	± 6.67%	40%	31%	–	30%

=== Results ===
2014 Nevada Secretary of State election
Party	Candidate	Votes	%	±%
Republican	Barbara Cegavske	273,720	50.40%	+13.13%
Democratic	Kate Marshall	250,612	46.14%	−7.03%
None of These Candidates		18,778	3.46%	-0.10%
Total votes		543,110	100.0%	
Republican gain from Democratic				
