= David M. Gardner =

American politician (born 1981)

Member of the Nevada Assembly from the 9th district
- In office November 5, 2014 – November 9, 2016
- Preceded by: Andrew Martin
- Succeeded by: Steve Yeager

Personal details
- Born: July 8, 1981 (age 45) Mesa, Arizona, U.S.
- Party: Republican
- Children: 4
- Education: UNLV
- Profession: Attorney
- Website: Official website

David M. Gardner (born July 8, 1981) is an American politician, who served as a Republican member of the Nevada Assembly from 2014 to 2016. He represented the southwest part of the Las Vegas Valley. Gardner defeated Democratic nominee Steve Yeager in 2014 general election, replacing Andrew Martin.

Gardner is an attorney and is married with four children.
