= Catherine Byrne (Nevada politician) =

American politician

22nd Controller of Nevada
- In office January 7, 2019 – January 2, 2023
- Governor: Steve Sisolak
- Preceded by: Ron Knecht
- Succeeded by: Andy Matthews

Personal details
- Born: March 27, 1964 (age 61)
- Party: Democratic
- Education: California Lutheran University (BS)

Catherine Byrne (born March 27, 1964) is an American politician from the state of Nevada.

She was elected Controller of Nevada on November 6, 2018, defeating Republican incumbent Ron Knecht with 50.58% of the votes. She is a certified public accountant and graduated from California Lutheran University. Byrne did not run for reelection.

Political offices
Preceded by Ron Knecht	Controller of Nevada; 2019–2023	Succeeded by Andy Matthews
