= 2024 United States presidential election in Nevada =

- November 5, 2024
- Turnout: 72.84% (▼5.38 pp)

| Nominee | Donald Trump | Kamala Harris |
| Party | Republican | Democratic |
| Home state | Florida | California |
| Running mate | JD Vance | Tim Walz |
| Electoral vote | 6 | 0 |
| Popular vote | 751,205 | 705,197 |
| Percentage | 50.59% | 47.49% |

Trump
40–50%
50–60%
60–70%
70–80%
80–90%
90–100%
Harris
40–50%
50–60%
60–70%
70–80%
80–90%
90–100%
Tie/No data
President before election
Joe Biden
Democratic
Elected President
Donald Trump
Republican

The 2024 United States presidential election in Nevada took place on Tuesday, November 5, 2024, as part of the 2024 United States presidential election in which all 50 states, plus the District of Columbia, participated. Nevada voters chose electors to represent them in the Electoral College via a popular vote. The state of Nevada has six electoral votes in the Electoral College, following reapportionment due to the 2020 United States census, in which the state neither gained nor lost a seat.

Donald Trump ran under the Republican banner a third consecutive time. Despite not carrying Nevada in either of his past two presidential campaigns, polling in the state showed him in a strong position to win the state against Joe Biden. Trump led Biden in all major polls on Nevada's voting intention from October 2023 until Biden's withdrawal in July 2024. Nevada also elected a Republican governor in 2022. However, Kamala Harris, from neighboring California, had polled somewhat better since becoming the Democratic nominee. The state was rated as a tossup by nearly all major news organizations.

Despite more competitive polling after Harris entered the race, Trump won Nevada, defeating Harris by 3.10% and becoming the first Republican to win the state since George W. Bush in 2004. Trump's gains with Latino and Filipino voters were crucial to him flipping the state, and his 751,205 votes set a new record for votes cast for any candidate in state history.

Nevada was the only state that voted Democratic in both 2016 and 2020 but flipped to Trump in 2024, and the only state that voted differently from 2016 to 2024 (though Nebraska's second congressional district, with one electoral vote, voted for Trump in 2016 and for Harris in 2024). Never before in American history have two presidential elections differed by only a single state, with the closest previous instance coming between 1884 and 1888, when only New York and Indiana changed their vote, and more recently between 2008 and 2012, when only North Carolina and again Indiana changed their vote, along with Nebraska’s second congressional district. Trump is also the only US president to win the White House without Nevada and then carry it upon winning re-election.

== Primary elections ==
=== Democratic primary ===
The Nevada Democratic primary was held on February 6, 2024.

2024 Nevada Democratic primary
| Candidate | Votes | % | Delegates |
|---|---|---|---|
| Joe Biden (incumbent) | 119,758 | 89.31 | 36 |
| Marianne Williamson | 4,101 | 3.06 | 0 |
| Gabriel Cornejo | 811 | 0.60 | 0 |
| Jason Palmer | 530 | 0.40 | 0 |
| Frankie Lozada | 315 | 0.23 | 0 |
| Armando Perez-Serrato | 264 | 0.20 | 0 |
| John Haywood | 241 | 0.18 | 0 |
| Stephen Lyons | 147 | 0.11 | 0 |
| Superpayaseria Crystalroc | 133 | 0.10 | 0 |
| Donald Picard | 124 | 0.09 | 0 |
| Brent Foutz | 93 | 0.07 | 0 |
| Stephen Alan Leon | 89 | 0.07 | 0 |
| Mark R. Prascak | 33 | 0.02 | 0 |
| None of These Candidates | 7,448 | 5.55 | — |
| Total | 134,087 | 100% | 36 |

=== Republican nominating contests ===
Although the Nevada state government established a primary system in 2021, the state Republican Party chose to boycott the primary, scheduled for February 6, in favor of a party-organized caucus, scheduled for February 8. Votes from the primary were not included in determining delegate allocation.

Nevada Republican primary, February 6, 2024
| Candidate | Votes | Percentage | | | |
|---|---|---|---|---|---|
| Candidate | Votes | Percentage | None of These Candidates | 50,763 | 63.26% |
| Nikki Haley | 24,583 | 30.63% | | | |
| Mike Pence (withdrawn) | 3,091 | 3.85% | | | |
| Tim Scott (withdrawn) | 1,081 | 1.35% | | | |
| John Anthony Castro | 270 | 0.34% | | | |
| Hirsh V. Singh (withdrawn) | 200 | 0.25% | | | |
| Donald Kjornes | 166 | 0.21% | | | |
| Heath V. Fulkerson | 95 | 0.12% | | | |
| Total: | 80,249 | 100.00% | | | |

Nevada Republican caucus, February 8, 2024
| Candidate | Votes | Percentage | Actual delegate count | | |
| Candidate | Votes | Percentage | Bound | Unbound | Total |
|---|---|---|---|---|---|
| Donald Trump | 59,982 | 99.11% | 25 | 1 (Note: If a candidate wins all of Nevada's delegates, the NRP chair is automatically unbound. He pledged his support to Trump.) | 26 |
| Ryan Binkley | 540 | 0.89% | 0 | 0 | 0 |
| Total | 60,522 | 100.00% | 25 | 1 | 26 |

== General election ==
=== Voting law changes ===
By 2022, every voter received a mail-in ballot unless they opted out, and eligible voters were automatically registered after common transactions at the DMV.

=== Predictions ===
| Source | Ranking | As of |
|---|---|---|
| The Cook Political Report | Tossup | November 4, 2024 |
| Sabato's Crystal Ball | Lean D | November 4, 2024 |
| Decision Desk HQ/The Hill | Tossup | November 4, 2024 |
| CNN | Tossup | November 4, 2024 |
| CNalysis | Tilt D | November 4, 2024 |
| The Economist | Tossup | November 4, 2024 |
| 538 | Tossup | November 4, 2024 |
| Inside Elections | Tossup | November 3, 2024 |
| NBC News | Tossup | November 4, 2024 |

=== Polling ===
Kamala Harris vs. Donald Trump

Aggregate polls

| Source of poll aggregation | Dates administered | Dates updated | Kamala Harris Democratic | Donald Trump Republican | Other / Undecided (Note: Calculated by taking the difference of 100% and all other candidates combined.) | Margin |
|---|---|---|---|---|---|---|
| 270ToWin | October 22 – November 4, 2024 | November 4, 2024 | 47.6% | 48.2% | 4.2% | Trump +0.6% |
| 538 | through November 4, 2024 | November 4, 2024 | 47.4% | 47.7% | 4.8% | Trump +0.3% |
| Silver Bulletin | through November 4, 2024 | November 5, 2024 | 47.9% | 48.5% | 3.6% | Trump +0.6% |
| The Hill/DDHQ | through November 4, 2024 | November 5, 2024 | 47.5% | 49.2% | 3.3% | Trump +1.7% |
| Average | | | 47.6% | 48.3% | 4.1% | Trump +0.7% |

| Poll source | Date(s) administered | Sample size (Note: Key: A – all adults RV – registered voters LV – likely voters V – unclear) | Margin of error | Kamala Harris Democratic | Donald Trump Republican | Other / Undecided |
|---|---|---|---|---|---|---|
| HarrisX | November 3–5, 2024 | 1,260 (RV) | ± 2.8% | 47% | 46% | 7% |
| HarrisX | November 3–5, 2024 | 1,260 (RV) | ± 2.8% | 51.6% (Note: With voters who lean towards a given candidate) | 48.5% | – |
| HarrisX | November 3–5, 2024 | 1,125 (LV) | ± 2.8% | 48% | 48% | 4% |
| HarrisX | November 3–5, 2024 | 1,125 (LV) | ± 2.8% | 50.5% | 49.5% | – |
| AtlasIntel | November 3–4, 2024 | 707 (LV) | ± 4.0% | 47% | 50% | 3% |
| AtlasIntel | November 3–4, 2024 | 707 (LV) | ± 4.0% | 47% | 50% | 3% (Note: "Blank / null / won't vote" with 1%) |
| Patriot Polling | November 1–3, 2024 | 792 (RV) | ± 3.0% | 49% | 50% | 1% |
| AtlasIntel | November 1–2, 2024 | 782 (LV) | ± 4.0% | 46% | 52% | 2% |
| AtlasIntel | November 1–2, 2024 | 782 (LV) | ± 4.0% | 46% | 51% | 3% |
| Emerson College | October 30 – November 2, 2024 | 840 (LV) | ± 3.3% | 48% | 48% | 4% (Note: "Someone else" & None of these candidates with 1% each) |
| Emerson College | October 30 – November 2, 2024 | 840 (LV) | ± 3.3% | 49% | 49% | 1% |
| The New York Times/Siena College | October 24 – November 2, 2024 | 1,010 (RV) | ± 3.5% | 48% | 46% | 6% |
| The New York Times/Siena College | October 24 – November 2, 2024 | 1,010 (LV) | ± 3.5% | 49% | 46% | 5% |
| AtlasIntel | October 30–31, 2024 | 845 (LV) | ± 3.0% | 47% | 51% | 2% |
| AtlasIntel | October 30–31, 2024 | 845 (LV) | ± 3.0% | 47% | 51% | 2% (Note: "Other" with 1%) |
| Emerson College (Note: Poll sponsored by RealClearWorld) | October 29–31, 2024 | 700 (LV) | ± 3.6% | 48% | 47% | 5% (Note: "Someone else" with 2%; None of these candidates with 1%) |
| Emerson College | October 29–31, 2024 | 700 (LV) | ± 3.6% | 49% | 48% | 3% |
| Noble Predictive Insights | October 28–31, 2024 | 593 (LV) | ± 4.0% | 49% | 48% | 3% |
| Susquehanna Polling & Research | October 28–31, 2024 | 400 (LV) | ± 4.9% | 44% | 50% | 6% |
| YouGov (Note: Poll conducted for The Times, Stanford University, Arizona State University, and Yale University) | October 25–31, 2024 | 790 (RV) | ± 4.6% | 50% | 49% | 1% |
| YouGov | October 25–31, 2024 | 773 (LV) | ± 4.6% | 50% | 49% | 1% |
| Data for Progress (D) | October 25–30, 2024 | 721 (LV) | ± 4.0% | 49% | 47% | 4% |
| Rasmussen Reports (R) (Note: Poll sponsored by American Thinker) | October 25–30, 2024 | 767 (LV) | ± 3.0% | 47% | 49% | 4% |
| AtlasIntel | October 25–29, 2024 | 1,083 (LV) | ± 3.0% | 48% | 49% | 3% |
| AtlasIntel | October 25–29, 2024 | 1,083 (LV) | ± 3.0% | 48% | 48% | 4% |
| Trafalgar Group (R) | October 25–28, 2024 | 1,082 (LV) | ± 2.9% | 48% | 48% | 4% (Note: "Other" with 2%) |
| CES/YouGov | October 1–25, 2024 | 940 (A) | – | 53% | 44% | 3% |
| CES/YouGov | October 1–25, 2024 | 933 (LV) | – | 51% | 47% | 2% |
| InsiderAdvantage (R) | October 20–21, 2024 | 800 (LV) | ± 3.5% | 48% | 48% | 4% |
| Bloomberg/Morning Consult | October 16–20, 2024 | 449 (RV) | ± 5.0% | 49% | 48% | 3% |
| Bloomberg/Morning Consult | October 16–20, 2024 | 420 (LV) | ± 5.0% | 49% | 48% | 3% |
| AtlasIntel | October 12–17, 2024 | 1,171 (LV) | ± 3.0% | 48% | 48% | 4% |
| Fabrizio Ward (R)/Impact Research (D) (Note: Poll commissioned by AARP) | October 8−15, 2024 | 600 (LV) | ± 4.0% | 47% | 49% | 4% (Note: None of these candidates with 2%) |
| Morning Consult | October 6−15, 2024 | 496 (LV) | ± 4.0% | 49% | 45% | 6% |
| Revere Solutions/Providence | October 22–23, 2024 | 538 (LV) | ± 4.0% | 46.8% | 50.6% | 2.6% |
| The Washington Post/Schar School | September 30 – October 15, 2024 | 652 (RV) | ± 4.8% | 47% | 44% | 9% |
| The Washington Post/Schar School | September 30 – October 15, 2024 | 652 (LV) | ± 4.8% | 48% | 48% | 4% |
| Rasmussen Reports (R) | October 9–14, 2024 | 748 (LV) | ± 3.0% | 47% | 49% | 4% |
| Trafalgar Group (R) | October 10–13, 2024 | 1,088 (LV) | ± 2.9% | 46% | 45% | 9% (Note: "Other" with 4%) |
| Fabrizio, Lee & Associates (R)/McLaughlin & Associates (R) (Note: Poll sponsored by Trump's campaign) | October 6–9, 2024 | 800 (LV) | ± 3.5% | 47% | 50% | 3% |
| Emerson College | October 5–8, 2024 | 900 (LV) | ± 3.2% | 48% | 47% | 5% (Note: None of these candidates & "Someone else" with 1% each) |
| Emerson College | October 5–8, 2024 | 900 (LV) | ± 3.2% | 49% | 48% | 3% (Note: None of these candidates with 2%; "Someone else" with 1%) |
| The Wall Street Journal | September 28 – October 8, 2024 | 600 (RV) | ± 5.0% | 43% | 49% | 8% |
| RMG Research (Note: Poll sponsored by the Napolitan Institute) | September 30 – October 3, 2024 | 782 (LV) | ± 3.5% | 49% | 47% | 4% (Note: "Some other candidate" with 1%) |
| RMG Research | September 30 – October 3, 2024 | 782 (LV) | ± 3.5% | 49% | 49% | 2% (Note: "Would not vote" with 2%) |
| OnMessage Inc. (R) (Note: Poll conducted for the Article III Project) | September 24 – October 2, 2024 | 500 (LV) | ± 4.4% | 45% | 47% | 8% |
| InsiderAdvantage (R) | September 29–30, 2024 | 800 (LV) | ± 3.0% | 48% | 49% | 1% |
| Global Strategy Group (D)/North Star Opinion Research (R) (Note: Poll sponsored by the Peter G. Peterson Foundation) | September 23–29, 2024 | 407 (LV) | ± 4.9% | 48% | 47% | 5% |
| TIPP Insights (Note: Poll sponsored by American Greatness) | September 23−25, 2024 | 1,044 (RV) | ± 3.7% | 48% | 44% | 8% |
| TIPP Insights | September 23−25, 2024 | 736 (LV) | ± 3.7% | 49% | 48% | 3% |
| Quantus Insights (R) (Note: Poll sponsored by TrendingPolitics) | September 23−25, 2024 | 628 (LV) | ± 4.0% | 48% | 49% | 3% (Note: "Some other candidate" with 4%) |
| AtlasIntel | September 20–25, 2024 | 858 (LV) | ± 3.0% | 51% | 48% | 1% |
| Cook Political Report/BSG (R)/GS Strategy Group (D) | September 19–25, 2024 | 409 (LV) | – | 48% | 47% | 5% |
| Bloomberg/Morning Consult | September 19–25, 2024 | 574 (RV) | ± 4.0% | 49% | 45% | 6% |
| Bloomberg/Morning Consult | September 19–25, 2024 | 516 (LV) | ± 4.0% | 52% | 45% | 3% |
| Rasmussen Reports (R) | September 19−22, 2024 | 738 (LV) | ± 3.0% | 48% | 49% | 3% |
| Remington Research Group (R) (Note: Poll sponsored by American Fuel & Petrochemical Manufacturers, a group that supports Republican candidates) | September 16–20, 2024 | 800 (LV) | ± 3.5% | 48% | 49% | 3% |
| The Tarrance Group (R) (Note: Poll conducted for the Democracy Defense Project) | September 16–19, 2024 | 600 (LV) | ± 4.1% | 47% | 44% | 9% (Note: "None of the above" with 4%; "Others" with 1%) |
| Emerson College | September 15–18, 2024 | 895 (LV) | ± 3.2% | 48% | 48% | 4% (Note: "Someone else" with 2%) |
| Emerson College | September 15–18, 2024 | 895 (LV) | ± 3.2% | 49% | 49% | 2% |
| Morning Consult | September 9−18, 2024 | 474 (LV) | ± 5.0% | 51% | 47% | 2% |
| Noble Predictive Insights | September 9−16, 2024 | 812 (RV) | ± 3.4% | 48% | 45% | 7% |
| Noble Predictive Insights | September 9−16, 2024 | 692 (LV) | ± 3.7% | 48% | 47% | 5% |
| Trafalgar Group (R) | September 11–13, 2024 | 1,079 (LV) | ± 2.9% | 45% | 44% | 11% (Note: "Other" with 8%) |
| Morning Consult | August 30 – September 8, 2024 | 516 (LV) | ± 4.0% | 48% | 48% | 4% |
| Patriot Polling | September 1–3, 2024 | 788 (RV) | – | 47% | 47% | 6% |
| InsiderAdvantage (R) | August 29–31, 2024 | 800 (LV) | ± 3.5% | 47% | 48% | 5% (Note: "Another candidate" with 2%) |
| Emerson College | August 25–28, 2024 | 1,168 (LV) | ± 2.8% | 49% | 48% | 3% (Note: "Someone else" with 1%) |
| Emerson College | August 25–28, 2024 | 1,168 (LV) | ± 2.8% | 49% | 49% | 1% (Note: "Someone else" with 1%; None of these candidates with 1%) |
| Bloomberg/Morning Consult | August 23–26, 2024 | 416 (LV) | ± 5.0% | 50% | 46% | 4% |
| Bloomberg/Morning Consult | August 23–26, 2024 | 450 (RV) | ± 5.0% | 49% | 45% | 6% |
| Fox News | August 23–26, 2024 | 1,026 (RV) | ± 3.0% | 50% | 48% | 2% |
| | August 23, 2024 | Robert F. Kennedy Jr. suspends his presidential campaign and endorses Donald Trump. | | | | |
| | August 19–22, 2024 | Democratic National Convention | | | | |
| Rasmussen Reports (R) (Note: Poll sponsored by NumbersUSA) | August 13–18, 2024 | 980 (LV) | ± 3.0% | 46% | 48% | 6% |
| Focaldata | August 6–16, 2024 | 678 (LV) | ± 3.8% | 54% | 46% | – |
| The New York Times/Siena College | August 12–15, 2024 | 677 (RV) | ± 4.4% | 46% | 48% | 6% |
| The New York Times/Siena College | August 12–15, 2024 | 677 (LV) | ± 4.4% | 47% | 48% | 5% |
| Cook Political Report/BSG (R)/GS Strategy Group (D) | July 26 – August 8, 2024 | 403 (LV) | – | 45% | 48% | 7% |
| | August 6, 2024 | Kamala Harris selects Gov. Tim Walz as her running mate. | | | | |
| Public Opinion Strategies (R) (Note: Poll conducted for Competitiveness Coalition) | July 23–29, 2024 | 400 (LV) | ± 4.9% | 45% | 46% | 9% |
| Bloomberg/Morning Consult | July 24–28, 2024 | 454 (RV) | ± 5.0% | 47% | 45% | 7% |
| | July 21, 2024 | Joe Biden announces his withdrawal; Kamala Harris declares her candidacy for president. | | | | |
| | July 18, 2024 | Republican National Convention concludes | | | | |
| InsiderAdvantage (R) | July 15–16, 2024 | 800 (LV) | ± 3.5% | 40% | 50% | 10% |
| | July 15, 2024 | Republican National Convention begins | | | | |
| | July 13, 2024 | attempted assassination of Donald Trump | | | | |
| Bloomberg/Morning Consult | May 7–13, 2024 | 459 (RV) | ± 5.0% | 44% | 47% | 9% |
| Emerson College | February 16–19, 2024 | 1,000 (RV) | ± 3.0% | 39% | 48% | 13% |
| The New York Times/Siena College | October 22 – November 3, 2023 | 611 (RV) | ± 4.4% | 42% | 48% | 10% |
| The New York Times/Siena College | October 22 – November 3, 2023 | 611 (LV) | ± 4.4% | 42% | 50% | 8% |

Kamala Harris vs. Donald Trump vs. Cornel West vs. Jill Stein vs. Chase Oliver

Aggregate polls

| Source of poll aggregation | Dates administered | Dates updated | Kamala Harris Democratic | Donald Trump Republican | Jill Stein (Note: Not on the ballot.) Green | Cornel West Independent | Chase Oliver Libertarian | Other/ Undecided | Margin |
|---|---|---|---|---|---|---|---|---|---|
| Race to the WH | through November 2, 2024 | November 3, 2024 | 47.9% | 47.3% | —N/a | —N/a | 1.2% | 3.6% | Harris +0.6% |
| 270toWin | October 22 – November 3, 2024 | November 3, 2024 | 47.8% | 47.4% | 0.0% | 0.0% | 1.0% | 3.8% | Harris +0.4% |
| Average | | | 47.9% | 47.4% | 0.0% | 0.0% | 1.1% | 3.7% | Harris +0.5% |

| Poll source | Date(s) administered | Sample size | Margin of error | Kamala Harris Democratic | Donald Trump Republican | Cornel West Independent | Jill Stein Green | Chase Oliver Libertarian | Other / Undecided |
|---|---|---|---|---|---|---|---|---|---|
| HarrisX | November 3–5, 2024 | 1,260 (RV) | ± 2.8% | 46% | 45% | 2% | 1% | – | 6% |
| HarrisX | November 3–5, 2024 | 1,260 (RV) | ± 2.8% | 50% | 46% | 3% | 1% | – | – |
| HarrisX | November 3–5, 2024 | 1,125 (LV) | ± 2.8% | 48% | 47% | 2% | 1% | – | 2% |
| HarrisX | November 3–5, 2024 | 1,125 (LV) | ± 2.8% | 49% | 48% | 2% | 1% | – | – |
| The New York Times/Siena College | October 24 – November 2, 2024 | 1,010 (RV) | ± 3.5% | 47% | 44% | – | – | 3% | 6% |
| The New York Times/Siena College | October 24 – November 2, 2024 | 1,010 (LV) | ± 3.5% | 48% | 46% | – | – | 2% | 4% |
| Focaldata | October 3 – November 1, 2024 | 1,324 (LV) | – | 48% | 47% | – | 0% | 1% | 4% |
| Focaldata | October 3 – November 1, 2024 | 1,197 (RV) | ± 2.7% | 49% | 45% | – | 0% | 2% | 4% |
| Focaldata | October 3 – November 1, 2024 | 1,324 (A) | – | 48% | 44% | – | 0% | 2% | 1% |
| Noble Predictive Insights | October 28–31, 2024 | 593 (LV) | ± 4.0% | 49% | 48% | – | – | 0% | 3% (Note: Joel Skousen (C) with 0%) |
| Redfield & Wilton Strategies | October 28–31, 2024 | 690 (LV) | – | 47% | 48% | – | 0% | 1% | 4% |
| YouGov | October 25–31, 2024 | 790 (RV) | ± 4.6% | 48% | 47% | 0% | 0% | – | 5% |
| YouGov | October 25–31, 2024 | 773 (LV) | ± 4.6% | 48% | 47% | 0% | 0% | – | 5% |
| Data for Progress (D) | October 25–30, 2024 | 721 (LV) | ± 4.0% | 49% | 47% | – | – | 1% | 3% |
| Redfield & Wilton Strategies | October 25–27, 2024 | 531 (LV) | – | 47% | 47% | – | – | 1% | 6% |
| CNN/SSRS | October 21–26, 2024 | 683 (LV) | ± 4.6% | 47% | 48% | – | – | 1% | 4% |
| Redfield & Wilton Strategies | October 20–22, 2024 | 540 (LV) | – | 46% | 47% | – | 0% | 0% | 7% |
| OnMessage Inc. (R) (Note: Poll sponsored by the Senate Opportunity Fund) | October 19–22, 2024 | 600 (LV) | ± 4.0% | 47% | 50% | – | – | 0% | 3% |
| Bloomberg/Morning Consult | October 16–20, 2024 | 449 (RV) | ± 5.0% | 48% | 47% | – | 0% | 2% | 3% |
| Bloomberg/Morning Consult | October 16–20, 2024 | 420 (LV) | ± 5.0% | 48% | 48% | – | 0% | 1% | 3% |
| Redfield & Wilton Strategies | October 16–18, 2024 | 529 (LV) | – | 46% | 47% | – | 1% | 1% | 5% |
| AtlasIntel | October 12–17, 2024 | 1,171 (LV) | ± 3.0% | 48% | 48% | – | 2% | 0% | 2% |
| Fabrizio Ward (R)/Impact Research (D) | October 8−15, 2024 | 600 (LV) | ± 4.0% | 46% | 47% | – | – | 1% | 6% |
| Redfield & Wilton Strategies | October 12–14, 2024 | 838 (LV) | – | 47% | 47% | – | 0% | 1% | 5% |
| Redfield & Wilton Strategies | September 27 – October 2, 2024 | 514 (LV) | – | 48% | 47% | – | 1% | 1% | 3% |
| TIPP Insights | September 23−25, 2024 | 1,044 (RV) | ± 3.7% | 48% | 43% | 1% | 0% | − | 9% |
| TIPP Insights | September 23−25, 2024 | 736 (LV) | ± 3.7% | 50% | 49% | 0% | 0% | − | 1% |
| AtlasIntel | September 20–25, 2024 | 858 (LV) | ± 3.0% | 51% | 48% | – | 1% | – | – |
| Bloomberg/Morning Consult | September 19–25, 2024 | 574 (RV) | ± 4.0% | 46% | 44% | – | 3% | 4% | 3% |
| Bloomberg/Morning Consult | September 19–25, 2024 | 516 (LV) | ± 4.0% | 50% | 44% | – | 2% | 2% | 2% |
| Redfield & Wilton Strategies | September 16–19, 2024 | 652 (LV) | – | 45% | 45% | – | 0% | 1% | 9% |
| Noble Predictive Insights | September 9−16, 2024 | 812 (RV) | ± 3.4% | 46% | 43% | – | 0% | 1% | 10% (Note: None of these candidates with 3%) |
| Noble Predictive Insights | September 9−16, 2024 | 692 (LV) | ± 3.7% | 47% | 47% | – | 0% | 1% | 5% (Note: None of these candidates with 1%) |
| Redfield & Wilton Strategies | September 6–9, 2024 | 698 (LV) | – | 45% | 46% | – | 1% | 1% | 7% |
| YouGov | August 23 – September 3, 2024 | 800 (RV) | ± 4.7% | 49% | 46% | 0% | 1% | – | 4% |
| CNN/SSRS | August 23–29, 2024 | 976 (LV) | ± 4.4% | 48% | 47% | – | 1% | 1% | 3% |
| Redfield & Wilton Strategies | August 25–28, 2024 | 490 (LV) | – | 47% | 47% | – | 1% | 0% | 5% |
| Bloomberg/Morning Consult | August 23–26, 2024 | 416 (LV) | ± 5.0% | 48% | 46% | – | 2% | 3% | 1% |
| Bloomberg/Morning Consult | August 23–26, 2024 | 450 (RV) | ± 5.0% | 48% | 45% | – | 2% | 4% | 1% |
| Fox News | August 23–26, 2024 | 1,026 (RV) | ± 3.0% | 48% | 46% | 2% | 1% | 1% | 2% |

Hypothetical polling with Robert F. Kennedy Jr.

Kamala Harris vs. Donald Trump vs. Robert F. Kennedy Jr. vs. Cornel West vs. Jill Stein vs. Chase Oliver

| Poll source | Date(s) administered | Sample size | Margin of error | Kamala Harris Democratic | Donald Trump Republican | Robert F. Kennedy Jr. Independent | Cornel West Independent | Jill Stein Green | Chase Oliver Libertarian | Other / Undecided |
|---|---|---|---|---|---|---|---|---|---|---|
| The Wall Street Journal | September 28 – October 8, 2024 | 600 (RV) | ± 5.0% | 42% | 47% | 0% | 0% | 0% | 3% | 8% |
| Global Strategy Group (D)/North Star Opinion Research (R) | September 23–29, 2024 | 407 (LV) | ± 4.9% | 47% | 47% | 0% | 0% | 0% | 2% | 4% |
| Rasmussen Reports (R) | August 13–18, 2024 | 980 (LV) | ± 3.0% | 44% | 46% | 5% | 0% | 0% | 1% | 4% |
| Focaldata | August 6–16, 2024 | 678 (LV) | ± 3.8% | 48% | 42% | 7% | – | 0% | 1% | 2% |
| Focaldata | August 6–16, 2024 | 678 (RV) | ± 3.8% | 49% | 39% | 9% | – | 0% | 1% | 2% |
| Focaldata | August 6–16, 2024 | 678 (A) | ± 3.8% | 49% | 39% | 9% | – | 0% | 1% | 2% |
| Redfield & Wilton Strategies | August 12–15, 2024 | 536 (LV) | – | 42% | 43% | 6% | – | 1% | 1% | 7% |
| The New York Times/Siena College | August 12–15, 2024 | 677 (RV) | ± 4.4% | 42% | 45% | 6% | 0% | 1% | 1% | 6% |
| The New York Times/Siena College | August 12–15, 2024 | 677 (LV) | ± 4.4% | 44% | 46% | 4% | 0% | 1% | 1% | 4% |
| Cook Political Report/BSG (R)/GS Strategy Group (D) | July 26 – August 8, 2024 | 403 (LV) | – | 42% | 47% | 5% | 0% | 1% | – | 5% |
| Redfield & Wilton Strategies | July 31 – August 3, 2024 | 470 (LV) | – | 40% | 40% | 5% | – | 1% | 0% | 14% |
| Bloomberg/Morning Consult | July 24–28, 2024 | 454 (RV) | ± 5.0% | 43% | 43% | 7% | – | 1% | 3% | 3% |
| Redfield & Wilton Strategies | July 22–24, 2024 | 435 (LV) | – | 43% | 45% | 5% | – | 1% | 0% | 6% |

Kamala Harris vs. Donald Trump vs. Robert F. Kennedy Jr.

| Poll source | Date(s) administered | Sample size | Margin of error | Kamala Harris Democratic | Donald Trump Republican | Robert F. Kennedy Jr. Independent | Other / Undecided |
|---|---|---|---|---|---|---|---|
| Strategies 360 | August 7–14, 2024 | 350 (RV) | ± 5.2% | 48% | 42% | 5% | 5% |
| Trafalgar Group (R) | August 6–8, 2024 | 1,087 (LV) | ± 2.9% | 45% | 48% | 3% | 4% (Note: "Others" with 2%) |

Hypothetical polling with Joe Biden and Donald Trump

Joe Biden vs. Donald Trump

| Poll source | Date(s) administered | Sample size | Margin of error | Joe Biden Democratic | Donald Trump Republican | Other / Undecided |
|---|---|---|---|---|---|---|
| | July 21, 2024 | Joe Biden announces his withdrawal; Kamala Harris declares her candidacy for president. | | | | |
| InsiderAdvantage (R) | July 15–16, 2024 | 800 (LV) | ± 3.5% | 42% | 49% | 9% |
| Emerson College (Note: Poll sponsored by Democrats for the Next Generation PAC) | July 15–16, 2024 | 1,000 (RV) | ± 3.0% | 41% | 46% | 13% |
| Rasmussen Reports (R) (Note: Poll sponsored by The Heartland Institute) | July 5–12, 2024 | 761 (LV) | ± 3.0% | 45% | 50% | 5% |
| Echelon Insights (Note: Poll sponsored by NetChoice) | July 1–8, 2024 | 402 (LV) | ± 6.6% | 41% | 50% | 9% |
| Bloomberg/Morning Consult | July 1–5, 2024 | 452 (RV) | ± 5.0% | 43% | 48% | 9% |
| Emerson College | June 30 – July 2, 2024 | 1,000 (RV) | ± 3.0% | 41% | 47% | 12% |
| National Public Affairs | June 28 – July 1, 2024 | 817 (LV) | ± 3.4% | 39% | 49% | 12% (Note: Chase Oliver (L) with 0%) |
| Emerson College | June 13–18, 2024 | 1,000 (RV) | ± 3.0% | 43% | 46% | 11% |
| Emerson College | June 13–18, 2024 | 1,000 (RV) | ± 3.0% | 50% | 50% | – |
| Fabrizio Ward (R)/Impact Research (D) | June 12–18, 2024 | 600 (LV) | ± 4.0% | 45% | 48% | 7% |
| Fox News | June 1–4, 2024 | 1,069 (RV) | ± 3.0% | 45% | 50% | 5% |
| The Tyson Group (Note: Poll sponsored by Breaking Battlegrounds) | May 22–25, 2024 | 601 (LV) | ± 4.0% | 44% | 47% | 9% |
| Mainstreet Research/Florida Atlantic University | May 19–21, 2024 | 522 (RV) | ± 4.3% | 42% | 50% | 8% |
| Mainstreet Research/Florida Atlantic University | May 19–21, 2024 | 494 (LV) | ± 4.3% | 43% | 51% | 6% |
| Prime Group (Note: Poll sponsored by Citizens to Save Our Republic PAC, which opposes Trump and third party candidates) | May 9–16, 2024 | 468 (RV) | – | 50% | 50% | – |
| Bloomberg/Morning Consult | May 7–13, 2024 | 459 (RV) | ± 5.0% | 47% | 47% | 6% |
| Cook Political Report/BSG (R)/GS Strategy Group (D) | May 6–13, 2024 | 402 (LV) | ± 4.9% | 40% | 49% | 11% |
| The New York Times/Siena College | April 28 – May 9, 2024 | 614 (RV) | ± 4.0% | 38% | 50% | 12% |
| The New York Times/Siena College | April 28 – May 9, 2024 | 614 (LV) | ± 4.0% | 38% | 51% | 11% |
| Emerson College | April 25–29, 2024 | 1,000 (RV) | ± 3.0% | 44% | 45% | 11% |
| Emerson College | April 25–29, 2024 | 1,000 (RV) | ± 3.0% | 49% | 51% | – |
| John Zogby Strategies (Note: Poll conducted for Kennedy's campaign) | April 13–21, 2024 | 517 (LV) | – | 44% | 50% | 6% |
| Bloomberg/Morning Consult | April 8–15, 2024 | 450 (RV) | ± 5.0% | 43% | 51% | 6% |
| The Wall Street Journal | March 17–24, 2024 | 600 (RV) | ± 4.0% | 44% | 48% | 8% |
| Echelon Insights (Note: Poll sponsored by The Heritage Foundation) | March 12–19, 2024 | 400 (LV) | ± 5.8% | 44% | 51% | 5% |
| Emerson College | March 12–15, 2024 | 1,000 (RV) | ± 3.0% | 41% | 44% | 15% |
| Emerson College | March 12–15, 2024 | 1,000 (RV) | ± 3.0% | 49% | 51% | – |
| Bloomberg/Morning Consult | March 8–15, 2024 | 447 (RV) | ± 5.0% | 44% | 46% | 10% |
| Noble Predictive Insights | February 27 – March 5, 2024 | 829 (RV) | ± 3.4% | 40% | 45% | 15% |
| Bloomberg/Morning Consult | February 12–20, 2024 | 445 (RV) | ± 5.0% | 42% | 48% | 10% |
| Emerson College | February 16–19, 2024 | 1,000 (RV) | ± 3.0% | 40% | 46% | 14% |
| Focaldata | January 17–23, 2024 | 704 (A) | – | 40% | 43% | 17% (Note: "Another candidate" with 10%) |
| Focaldata | January 17–23, 2024 | – (LV) | – | 42% | 44% | 14% (Note: "Another candidate" with 7%) |
| Focaldata | January 17–23, 2024 | – (LV) | – | 49% | 51% | – |
| Bloomberg/Morning Consult | January 16–21, 2024 | 457 (RV) | ± 5.0% | 40% | 48% | 12% |
| Emerson College | January 5–8, 2024 | 1,294 (RV) | ± 2.6% | 45% | 47% | 8% |
| Change Research (D)/Future Majority (D) | December 3–7, 2023 | (RVs) | – | 40% | 44% | 14% |
| Bloomberg/Morning Consult | November 27 – December 6, 2023 | 451 (RV) | ± 5.0% | 44% | 47% | 9% |
| Bloomberg/Morning Consult | October 30 – November 7, 2023 | 437 (RV) | ± 5.0% | 43% | 46% | 11% |
| Emerson College | October 30 – November 4, 2023 | 1,000 (RV) | ± 3.0% | 39% | 46% | 14% |
| The New York Times/Siena College | October 22 – November 3, 2023 | 611 (RV) | ± 4.4% | 41% | 52% | 7% |
| The New York Times/Siena College | October 22 – November 3, 2023 | 611 (LV) | ± 4.4% | 41% | 52% | 7% |
| Bloomberg/Morning Consult | October 5–10, 2023 | 503 (RV) | ± 4.0% | 46% | 43% | 11% |
| CNN | September 29 – October 3, 2023 | 1,251 (RV) | ± 4.6% | 46% | 45% | 9% |
| Vote TXT | May 15–19, 2023 | 412 (RV) | – | 41% | 48% | 11% |
| Prime Group | June 14–28, 2023 | 500 (RV) | – | 51% | 49% | – |
| Prime Group | June 14–28, 2023 | 500 (RV) | – | 39% | 39% | 22% (Note: No Labels candidate) |
| Noble Predictive Insights | April 18–26, 2023 | 613 (RV) | ± 4.0% | 48% | 40% | 12% |
| Public Opinion Strategies (R) | April 17–20, 2023 | 500 (RV) | ± 4.4% | 46% | 45% | 9% |
| OH Predictive Insights | January 30 – February 6, 2023 | 800 (RV) | ± 3.5% | 40% | 42% | 18% |
| Rasmussen Reports (R) | November 8–9, 2022 | 679 (LV) | ± 4.0% | 41% | 45% | 14% |
| Susquehanna Polling & Research (Note: Poll sponsored by BUSR) | October 24–27, 2022 | 500 (LV) | ± 4.3% | 47% | 48% | 5% |
| Rasmussen Reports (R) (Note: Poll sponsored by Capitol Resource Institute) | October 13–17, 2022 | 707 (LV) | ± 4.0% | 37% | 49% | 14% |
| Emerson College | September 8–10, 2022 | 1,000 (LV) | ± 3.0% | 40% | 43% | 17% |
| Emerson College | July 7–10, 2022 | 2,000 (RV) | ± 2.1% | 40% | 43% | 17% |
| Blueprint Polling (D) | March 21–24, 2022 | 671 (LV) | ± 3.8% | 34% | 44% | 22% |

Joe Biden vs. Donald Trump vs. Robert F. Kennedy Jr. vs. Cornel West vs. Jill Stein

| Poll source | Date(s) administered | Sample size | Margin of error | Joe Biden Democratic | Donald Trump Republican | Robert F. Kennedy Jr. Independent | Cornel West Independent | Jill Stein Green | Other / Undecided |
|---|---|---|---|---|---|---|---|---|---|
| Redfield & Wilton Strategies | July 16–18, 2024 | 412 (LV) | – | 41% | 44% | 7% | – | 1% | 7% |
| Emerson College | July 15–16, 2024 | 1,000 (RV) | ± 3.0% | 40% | 43% | 7% | 1% | 1% | 8% (Note: Chase Oliver (L) with 1%) |
| Rasmussen Reports (R) | July 5–12, 2024 | 761 (LV) | ± 3.0% | 39% | 47% | 8% | 2% | 1% | 3% |
| YouGov | July 4–12, 2024 | 800 (RV) | ± 4.7% | 42% | 46% | 3% | 0% | 1% | 8% |
| Echelon Insights | July 1–8, 2024 | 402 (LV) | ± 6.6% | 35% | 45% | 9% | 2% | 2% | 7% |
| Bloomberg/Morning Consult | July 1–5, 2024 | 452 (RV) | ± 5.0% | 39% | 45% | 6% | 2% | 0% | 8% |
| National Public Affairs | June 28 – July 1, 2024 | 817 (LV) | ± 3.4% | 33% | 42% | 12% | 3% | 2% | 8% |
| Emerson College | June 13–18, 2024 | 1,000 (RV) | ± 3.0% | 39% | 42% | 7% | 2% | 2% | 8% |
| Fox News | June 1–4, 2024 | 1,069 (RV) | ± 3.0% | 40% | 45% | 7% | 2% | 2% | 4% |
| The Tyson Group (Note: Poll sponsored by Breaking Battlegrounds) | May 22–25, 2024 | 601 (LV) | ± 4.0% | 37% | 40% | 9% | 1% | 2% | 11% |
| Prime Group | May 9–16, 2024 | 468 (RV) | – | 43% | 44% | 10% | 3% | 0% | – |
| Bloomberg/Morning Consult | May 7–13, 2024 | 459 (RV) | ± 5.0% | 39% | 44% | 7% | 2% | 1% | 7% |
| Cook Political Report/BSG (R)/GS Strategy Group (D) | May 6–13, 2024 | 402 (LV) | ± 4.9% | 35% | 43% | 10% | 2% | 3% | 7% |
| The New York Times/Siena College | April 28 – May 9, 2024 | 614 (RV) | ± 4.0% | 27% | 41% | 12% | 0% | 2% | 18% (Note: Lars Mapstead (L) with 2%) |
| The New York Times/Siena College | April 28 – May 9, 2024 | 614 (LV) | ± 4.0% | 30% | 44% | 11% | 0% | 1% | 14% |
| Emerson College | April 25–29, 2024 | 1,000 (RV) | ± 3.0% | 37% | 42% | 8% | 2% | 1% | 11% |
| Bloomberg/Morning Consult | April 8–15, 2024 | 450 (RV) | ± 5.0% | 34% | 48% | 7% | 2% | 3% | 6% |
| The Wall Street Journal | March 17–24, 2024 | 600 (RV) | ± 4.0% | 33% | 37% | 15% | 2% | 2% | 11% |
| Emerson College | March 12–15, 2024 | 1,000 (RV) | ± 3.0% | 36% | 41% | 9% | 1% | 2% | 11% |
| Bloomberg/Morning Consult | March 8–15, 2024 | 447 (RV) | ± 5.0% | 36% | 42% | 11% | 1% | 1% | 11% |
| Noble Predictive Insights | February 27 – March 5, 2024 | 829 (RV) | ± 3.4% | 33% | 40% | 11% | 4% | 2% | 10% |
| Bloomberg/Morning Consult | February 12–20, 2024 | 445 (RV) | ± 5.0% | 37% | 44% | 9% | 1% | 0% | 9% |
| Emerson College | February 16–19, 2024 | 1,000 (RV) | ± 3.0% | 34% | 44% | 6% | 1% | 1% | 14% |
| Bloomberg/Morning Consult | January 16–21, 2024 | 457 (RV) | ± 5.0% | 31% | 43% | 12% | 1% | 2% | 11% |
| Emerson College | January 5–8, 2024 | 1,294 (RV) | ± 2.6% | 39% | 42% | 5% | 1% | 1% | 12% |
| Bloomberg/Morning Consult | November 27 – December 6, 2023 | 451 (RV) | ± 5.0% | 37% | 42% | 11% | 2% | 1% | 7% |

Joe Biden vs. Donald Trump vs. Robert F. Kennedy Jr.

| Poll source | Date(s) administered | Sample size | Margin of error | Joe Biden Democratic | Donald Trump Republican | Robert F. Kennedy Jr. Independent | Other / Undecided |
|---|---|---|---|---|---|---|---|
| P2 Insights (Note: Poll sponsored by Building America's Future, which supports Republican candidates) | June 11–20, 2024 | 650 (LV) | ± 3.8% | 37% | 40% | 8% | 15% |
| Fabrizio Ward (R)/Impact Research (D) | June 12–18, 2024 | 600 (LV) | ± 4.0% | 37% | 44% | 10% | 9% |
| Mainstreet Research/Florida Atlantic University | May 19–21, 2024 | 522 (RV) | ± 4.3% | 40% | 44% | 9% | 7% |
| Mainstreet Research/Florida Atlantic University | May 19–21, 2024 | 494 (LV) | ± 4.3% | 40% | 46% | 8% | 6% |
| Iron Light Intelligence (Note: Poll commissioned by League of American Workers) | May 17–21, 2024 | 600 (LV) | ± 4.0% | 34% | 37% | 15% | 14% |
| P2 Insights | May 13−21, 2024 | 650 (LV) | ± 3.8% | 40% | 41% | 9% | 10% |
| The New York Times/Siena College | October 22 – November 3, 2023 | 611 (RV) | ± 4.4% | 31% | 38% | 23% | 8% |
| The New York Times/Siena College | October 22 – November 3, 2023 | 611 (LV) | ± 4.4% | 34% | 40% | 19% | 7% |

Joe Biden vs. Donald Trump vs. Robert F. Kennedy Jr. vs. Cornel West

| Poll source | Date(s) administered | Sample size | Margin of error | Joe Biden Democratic | Donald Trump Republican | Robert F. Kennedy Jr. Independent | Cornel West Independent | Other / Undecided |
|---|---|---|---|---|---|---|---|---|
| Bloomberg/Morning Consult | October 30 – November 7, 2023 | 437 (RV) | ± 5.0% | 35% | 39% | 11% | 1% | 14% |

Hypothetical polling with other candidates

Joe Biden vs. Robert F. Kennedy Jr.

| Poll source | Date(s) administered | Sample size | Margin of error | Joe Biden Democratic | Robert F. Kennedy Jr. Independent | Other / Undecided |
|---|---|---|---|---|---|---|
| John Zogby Strategies | April 13–21, 2024 | 517 (LV) | – | 39% | 51% | 10% |

Robert F. Kennedy Jr. vs. Donald Trump

| Poll source | Date(s) administered | Sample size | Margin of error | Robert F. Kennedy Jr. Independent | Donald Trump Republican | Other / Undecided |
|---|---|---|---|---|---|---|
| John Zogby Strategies | April 13–21, 2024 | 517 (LV) | – | 40% | 46% | 14% |

Joe Biden vs. Nikki Haley

| Poll source | Date(s) administered | Sample size | Margin of error | Joe Biden Democratic | Nikki Haley Republican | Other / Undecided |
|---|---|---|---|---|---|---|
| The New York Times/Siena College | October 22 – November 3, 2023 | 611 (RV) | ± 4.4% | 38% | 44% | 18% |
| The New York Times/Siena College | October 22 – November 3, 2023 | 611 (LV) | ± 4.4% | 37% | 46% | 17% |

Joe Biden vs. Ron DeSantis

| Poll source | Date(s) administered | Sample size | Margin of error | Joe Biden Democratic | Ron DeSantis Republican | Other / Undecided |
|---|---|---|---|---|---|---|
| The New York Times/Siena College | October 22 – November 3, 2023 | 611 (RV) | ± 4.4% | 42% | 43% | 15% |
| The New York Times/Siena College | October 22 – November 3, 2023 | 611 (LV) | ± 4.4% | 41% | 45% | 14% |
| Vote TXT | May 15–19, 2023 | 412 (RV) | – | 36% | 46% | 17% |
| Noble Predictive Insights | April 18–26, 2023 | 613 (RV) | ± 4.0% | 43% | 42% | 15% |
| Public Opinion Strategies (R) | April 17–20, 2023 | 500 (RV) | ± 4.4% | 41% | 44% | 10% |
| OH Predictive Insights | January 30 – February 6, 2023 | 800 (RV) | ± 3.5% | 36% | 42% | 22% |
| Emerson College | July 7–10, 2022 | 2,000 (RV) | ± 2.1% | 38% | 43% | 19% |

Gavin Newsom vs. Ron DeSantis

| Poll source | Date(s) administered | Sample size | Margin of error | Gavin Newsom Democratic | Ron DeSantis Republican | Other / Undecided |
|---|---|---|---|---|---|---|
| Susquehanna Polling & Research | October 24–27, 2022 | 500 (LV) | ± 4.3% | 42% | 46% | 12% |

Gavin Newsom vs. Donald Trump

| Poll source | Date(s) administered | Sample size | Margin of error | Gavin Newsom Democratic | Donald Trump Republican | Other / Undecided |
|---|---|---|---|---|---|---|
| Emerson College | February 16–19, 2024 | 1,000 (RV) | ± 3.0% | 32% | 49% | 19% |

=== Results ===
State Senate district results: Trump 40–50% 50–60% 60–70% / Harris 40–50% 50–60% 60–70% 70–80%

State Assembly district results: Trump 40–50% 50–60% 60–70% 70–80% / Harris 40–50% 50–60% 60–70% 70–80%

2024 United States presidential election in Nevada
| Party | Candidate | Votes | % | ±% |
|---|---|---|---|---|
| Republican | Donald Trump; JD Vance | 751,205 | 50.59% | ▲2.92% |
| Democratic | Kamala Harris; Tim Walz | 705,197 | 47.49% | ▼2.57% |
| None of These Candidates | | 19,625 | 1.32% | ▲0.32% |
| Libertarian | Chase Oliver; Mike ter Maat | 6,059 | 0.41% | ▼0.64% |
| Independent American | Joel Skousen (Note: Randall Terry was nominated by the national Constitution Party, though the state party nominated Joel Skousen.); Rik Combs | 2,754 | 0.19% | ▼0.03% |
| Total votes | | 1,484,840 | 100.00% | N/A |

==== By county ====
| County | Donald Trump Republican | | Kamala Harris Democratic | | Various candidates Other parties | | Margin | | Total |
| County | # | % | # | % | # | % | # | % | Total |
|---|---|---|---|---|---|---|---|---|---|
| Carson City | 16,873 | 54.31% | 13,375 | 43.05% | 820 | 2.64% | 3,498 | 11.26% | 31,068 |
| Churchill | 9,962 | 73.78% | 3,179 | 23.54% | 362 | 2.68% | 6,783 | 50.23% | 13,503 |
| Clark | 493,052 | 47.81% | 520,187 | 50.44% | 17,984 | 1.74% | -27,135 | -2.63% | 1,031,223 |
| Douglas | 23,237 | 65.35% | 11,553 | 32.49% | 766 | 2.15% | 11,684 | 32.86% | 35,556 |
| Elko | 17,352 | 77.24% | 4,632 | 20.62% | 481 | 2.14% | 12,720 | 56.62% | 22,465 |
| Esmeralda | 376 | 81.56% | 73 | 15.84% | 12 | 2.60% | 303 | 65.73% | 461 |
| Eureka | 910 | 87.84% | 104 | 10.04% | 22 | 2.12% | 806 | 77.80% | 1,036 |
| Humboldt | 6,141 | 76.48% | 1,711 | 21.31% | 178 | 2.22% | 4,430 | 55.17% | 8,030 |
| Lander | 2,180 | 80.00% | 482 | 17.69% | 63 | 2.31% | 1,698 | 62.31% | 2,725 |
| Lincoln | 2,108 | 85.28% | 314 | 12.70% | 50 | 2.02% | 1,794 | 72.57% | 2,472 |
| Lyon | 23,861 | 71.14% | 8,954 | 26.70% | 726 | 2.16% | 14,907 | 44.44% | 33,541 |
| Mineral | 1,528 | 66.58% | 711 | 30.98% | 56 | 2.44% | 817 | 35.60% | 2,295 |
| Nye | 18,946 | 70.18% | 7,559 | 28.00% | 492 | 1.82% | 11,387 | 42.18% | 26,997 |
| Pershing | 1,764 | 76.43% | 496 | 21.49% | 48 | 2.08% | 1,268 | 54.94% | 2,308 |
| Storey | 2,108 | 68.55% | 913 | 29.69% | 54 | 1.76% | 1,195 | 38.86% | 3,075 |
| Washoe | 127,443 | 48.32% | 130,071 | 49.32% | 6,220 | 2.36% | -2,628 | -1.00% | 263,734 |
| White Pine | 3,364 | 77.32% | 883 | 20.29% | 104 | 2.39% | 2,481 | 57.02% | 4,351 |
| Totals | 751,205 | 50.59% | 705,197 | 47.49% | 28,438 | 1.92% | 46,008 | 3.10% | 1,484,840 |

==== By congressional district ====
Trump won two of four congressional districts, including one that elected a Democrat.

| District | Harris | Trump | Representative |
|---|---|---|---|
| 1st | 50.24% | 47.98% | Dina Titus |
| 2nd | 41.87% | 55.80% | Mark Amodei |
| 3rd | 48.81% | 49.54% | Susie Lee |
| 4th | 50.24% | 47.92% | Steven Horsford |

== Analysis ==
Nevada is a Mountain West state, as well as a crucial swing state for the election. Trump became the first Republican presidential candidate to win the state since George W. Bush's narrow victory in 2004. It had not been won by double digits since Barack Obama in 2008 against John McCain. Nevada had voted for the winner of every presidential election since 1980, with the exception of 2016, when it backed Hillary Clinton; and has been decided by single digits in every presidential election since 1992, with the exception of Obama's 12.5% win in 2008. Obama won by less than 7% in 2012, and Trump lost by less than 2.5% in both 2016 and 2020. Today Nevada is a purple state. Democratic strength in Nevada is almost entirely focused on Las Vegas and Reno, along with many of their suburbs.

Trump's win was the first time since statehood that Nevada voted for a Republican and Colorado voted for a Democrat, as well as the first time since 2000 that New Mexico and Nevada had voted for different candidates in a presidential election. Trump won 47.8% of the vote in Clark County, home to Las Vegas, the highest percentage since 1988. Nevada was the only state that Trump lost in both 2016 and 2020 but won in 2024. This marked the sixth election in a row since 2004 that Nevada voted for the winner of the national popular vote, the longest active streak among any bellwether state. Nevada was one of four states that shifted to the right all three times Trump ran, the others being Arkansas, Florida, and Hawaii. It was also one of only six states where Harris received more raw votes than Biden in 2020. (Note: The other five states were Georgia, Maine, North Carolina, Utah, and Wisconsin.)

This was the first presidential election in which Clark County cast over a million votes. Lastly, this was also the first presidential election in Nevada's history in which both Clark County and Washoe County failed to back the winning candidate since the former's foundation in 1909 (in spite of the two counties making up the vast majority of the state's population). Ultimately, this occurrence is not unprecedented in Nevada's electoral history, as it has occurred twice before in Nevada's 2014 race for Attorney General and 2022 race for governor.

== See also ==
- United States presidential elections in Nevada
- 2024 Democratic Party presidential primaries
- 2024 Republican Party presidential primaries
- 2024 United States elections

== Notes ==
Partisan clients
