= Andrew Martin (Nevada politician) =

American politician

Member of the Nevada Assembly from the 9th district
- In office February 4, 2013 – January 2015
- Preceded by: Tick Segerblom
- Succeeded by: David M. Gardner

Personal details
- Born: February 19, 1964 (age 62) Newark, New Jersey, U.S.
- Party: Democratic
- Spouse: Dana Barooshian
- Education: Binghamton University (BS, MS)
- Website: Campaign website

Andrew Martin (born February 19, 1964) is an American politician and certified public accountant who has served as the Clark County Democratic Party Chair, as a Member of the Nevada State Economic Forum, a Member of the Clark County School District Bond Oversight Committee, and as a member of the Nevada Assembly. He is a member of the Democratic Party.

Martin graduated from Binghamton University in New York before earning his CPA license and beginning a career as an accountant. He later founded his own accounting firm. In 2012, he was elected to the Assembly, although his eligibility to serve in the legislature was disputed during the election. He served in the state assembly for 2 years, working on a variety of legislation. In 2014, he ran for state controller, losing in the general election. He then returned to private practice at his accounting firm.

== Career ==
=== Accounting career ===
Andrew Martin was born in Newark, New Jersey. He studied at Binghamton University, earning a BS degree in Accounting in 1986 and an MS in Accounting in 1989. He also received his CPA license in 1989. Andrew Martin worked as an accountant for many years, including a stint at KPMG, before founding his own accounting firm, Martin & Associates Ltd. The accounting firm specializes in tax, risk management, and outsourced CFO services. The firm also used to have an auditing practice that it sold off, which worked with government clients. Martin and his firm worked as an independent auditor for the Clinton and Bush Administrations, auditing several executive agencies during that time period. Dana Barooshian is also a partner at the firm.

=== Election in 2012 ===
After working in the private sector, Martin decided to run for the Nevada State Assembly in the 9th district. He ran for the seat against Republican Kelly Hurst. During the election, Hurst disputed Martin's residency and thus his right to run in the district. Martin and his husband own two properties in Las Vegas; a condominium in the 9th District and a house outside of it. Hurst hired a private investigator to follow Martin to determine which of the two properties Martin was using as his primary residence. Martin's position was that the condominium was his primary residence, while the out-of-district home was being used, pending its sale, as an office for his accounting firm. On the basis of the private investigator's testimony that Martin was seen charging his hybrid vehicle at the out-of-district home, on November 5, 2012, just one day before the election, a judge ruled Martin ineligible to stand for election on the grounds of failing to meet the legislature's residency requirements.

As the ruling came too late for Clark County election officials to change the ballots, Martin's name remained on the ballot, and the Republican campaign instead stationed volunteers at each polling station to verbally inform voters that Martin was ineligible for election. Despite the controversy, however, Martin won the election. On February 4, 2013, the legislature seated Martin, and no formal challenge was filed against him.

=== State Assembly ===
During Martin's first session in the state legislature he sponsored or co sponsored several bills. Andrew Martin sponsored SJR-13, which was a joint resolution alongside the Nevada State Senate to amend the state constitution to legalize same-sex marriage. The legislation passed the assembly 27–14, and passed the senate by a vote of 12–9. Andrew Martin had a personal connection to the legislation; he wanted to legally marry his partner Dana Barooshian, who he had known for 27 years at that point. The resolution required the 2nd approval of the legislature in the 2015 legislative session, and then voter approval in the 2016 election. The resolution did not progress further after the United States Court of Appeals for the Ninth Circuit struck down Nevada's same-sex marriage ban in October 2014.

Martin also sponsored AB 327. The law, which passed both houses and was signed by the governor, established a hotline and internet resources so that government employees, contractors, and other individuals could anonymously report fraud, corruption, and other governmental malpractices. Reporters of malpractice can leave anonymous voice messages for the Division of Internal Audits, describing any criminal activity they learned about while working for the state government. Anonymity could possibly be revoked if the tip led to criminal proceedings for the accused. The new law works with existing state anti-corruption statutes to improve the reporting of corruption. The original bill sought to move the Division of Internal Audits to the controller's office, but that part of the bill was amended away before the bill passed.

Martin cosponsored AB-395, Making it illegal for Common Interest Community Managers, employees, or board members to intimidate, harass or bully residents or guests.

=== 2014 Controller race ===
Martin ran for Nevada State Controller in the 2014 election and was defeated by Republican Ron Knecht. Before running, Martin posted an open letter to his constituents on his website, Martin for Nevada, to ask for their thoughts on his candidacy. He also ran on his experience as a CPA and as an independent auditor. Martin was uncontested in the primary election on June 10, 2014. Martin was defeated in the general election on November 4, 2014.

=== 2018 Treasurer Race ===
On November 27, 2017, Martin announced that he was running for Nevada State Treasurer in the 2018 election. He was seeking to succeed Republican Dan Schwartz, who declined to run for re-election to the treasurer position in order to run in the 2018 race for governor. Martin later dropped out of the Treasurer race in March 2018 during the Democratic Party primary process.

== Personal ==
Martin is openly gay. His husband is Dana Barooshian. They met while studying at Binghamton University. Martin married Barooshian, his partner since 1986, in Washington, DC on November 10, 2013.
