= 2016 United States presidential election in Nevada =

- November 8, 2016
- Turnout: 76.83% ▲
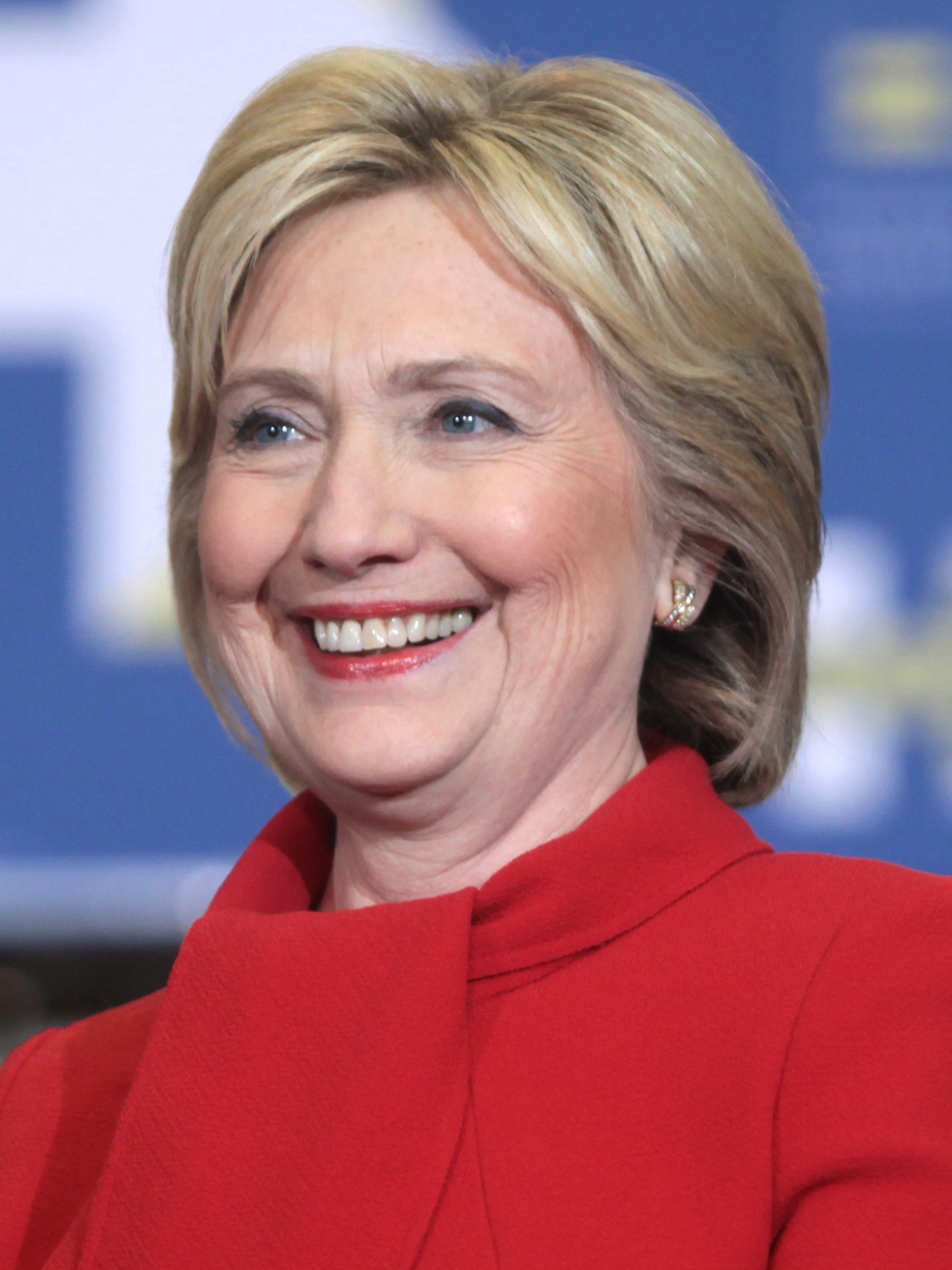

Nominee	Hillary Clinton	Donald Trump
Party	Democratic	Republican
Home state	New York	New York
Running mate	Tim Kaine	Mike Pence
Electoral vote	6	0
Popular vote	539,260	512,058
Percentage	47.92%	45.50%

Clinton
40–50%
50–60%
60–70%
70–80%
80–90%
90–100%
Trump
40–50%
50–60%
60–70%
70–80%
80–90%
90–100%
Tie/No data
President before election
Barack Obama
Democratic
Elected President
Donald Trump
Republican

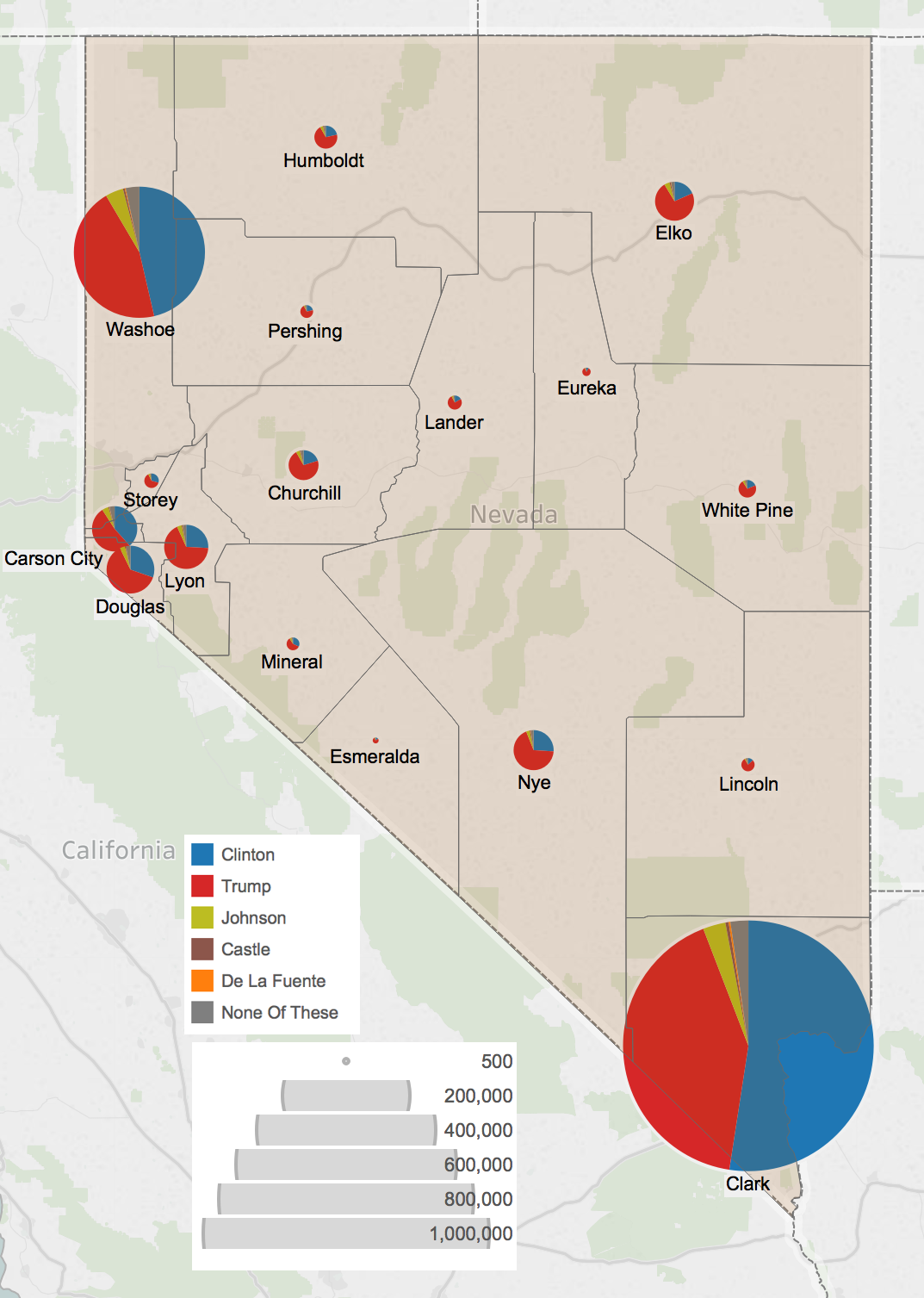
Results by county with size showing number of votes

Treemap of the popular vote by county

The 2016 United States presidential election in Nevada was held on Tuesday, November 8, 2016, as part of the 2016 United States presidential election in which all 50 states plus the District of Columbia participated. Nevada voters chose electors to represent them in the Electoral College via a popular vote, pitting the Republican Party's nominee, businessman Donald Trump (and his running mate Indiana Governor Mike Pence), against the Democratic Party's nominee, former U.S. Secretary of State Hillary Clinton (and her running mate Virginia Senator Tim Kaine). Nevada has six votes in the Electoral College.

Clinton won the state with 47.92% of the vote, while Trump won 45.5%, a tight margin of 2.42% between the two. Clinton's vote share marked a considerable decline from the vote shares Barack Obama got from the state in 2008 and 2012. Despite this, Nevada was the only state that Clinton won in 2016 that Kamala Harris lost in 2024. Nevada's popular vote results made the state 0.33% to the left of the nation at-large and therefore the closest to the national popular vote results. 2016 was the first time since 1988 that either major party won Nevada in more than two consecutive presidential races, and the first time Democrats did so since 1948.

With his overall victory in the presidential election, Trump became the first Republican since William McKinley in 1900 to win the presidency without carrying Washoe County. This is also the only time since William Howard Taft in 1908 that a Republican won the presidency without Nevada, and the last time that neither major party won a majority of the vote in Nevada. Trump later won the state in 2024, maintaining its streak of voting for every winner of the popular vote since 2004.

== Primary elections ==
=== Democratic caucuses ===
Democratic caucus results by county. Hillary Clinton Bernie Sanders Tie

The 2016 Nevada Democratic caucuses took place on February 20 in the U.S. state of Nevada, traditionally marking the Democratic Party's third nominating contest in their series of presidential primaries ahead of the 2016 presidential election.

With all other candidates having dropped out of the race ahead of the Nevada caucuses, the two remaining candidates were Bernie Sanders and Hillary Clinton.

==== Process ====
Of the total number of 43 delegates the Nevada Democratic Party may send to the 2016 Democratic National Convention, 35 are pledged and 8 are unpledged.

The delegate selection process is a system with three levels:

1. The first step in the delegate selection process were the precinct caucuses on February 20, which elected about 12,000 delegates to the county conventions.
2. At the county conventions on April 2, the county delegates selected about 4,000 delegates to the state convention.
3. At the state convention on May 14–15, the final 35 pledged delegates to the National Convention will be selected. Of them, 23 are allocated proportionally based on congressional district results, whereas the remaining 12 are allocated based on the state convention as a whole.

A majority of participants at the February caucuses supported Hillary Clinton. However, the county conventions on April 2, 2016, resulted in more Sanders delegates than Clinton delegates being sent to the state convention in May.

==== Debates and forums ====
October 2015 debate in Las Vegas

On October 13, 2015, the Democratic Party's first debate was held at the Wynn Hotel in Las Vegas. Hosted by Anderson Cooper, it aired on CNN and was broadcast on radio by Westwood One. Participants were the candidates Hillary Clinton, Bernie Sanders, Jim Webb, Martin O'Malley, and Lincoln Chafee. It was the only debate appearance of Chafee and Webb, who ended their campaigns on October 23 and October 20, respectively.

February 2016 forum in Las Vegas

On February 18, MSNBC and Telemundo hosted a forum in Las Vegas.

==== Caucus Results ====
Nevada Democratic caucuses, February 20, 2016
Candidate	County delegates		Estimated delegates		
Candidate	Count	Percentage	Pledged	Unpledged	Total
Hillary Clinton	6,440	52.64%	20	4	24
Bernie Sanders	5,785	47.29%	15	1	16
Uncommitted	8	0.07%	0	3	3
Total	12,233	100%	35	8	43

==== County Conventions ====
The County Conventions were marked by bickering between Clinton and Sanders supporters, most notably in Clark County, which had been won by Clinton during the caucuses and led to the attempted arrest of the head of the credentials committee, Sanders supporter Christine Kramar, after the Clinton supporters on the Clark County Democratic committee attempted to depose her from her position. Kramar had discovered that the Clark County Democratic Party had been having private correspondence with only Clinton's campaign, as opposed to both campaigns.

The results statewide goes as follows: Sanders 3846 (55.23%) Clinton 2124 (44.77%)

Sanders won most of the northern counties in Nevada, including Washoe County, and Clinton won most of the southern counties, including Clark County.

==== State Convention ====
The state convention was held in May as the final stage of the delegate selection process. Supports of Senator Sanders were angered when Party officials declined to accept the credentials of close to 60 pro-Sanders delegates. Nevada Democratic Party Chairwoman, Roberta Lange, allegedly received numerous death threats and threats to the lives of her family and grandchildren; a criminal investigation has yet to confirm these claims or the identities of those allegedly involved. At the convention, Sanders supporters protested until the staff cancelled the event. The event was later criticized as being violent, although there is no evidence that violence occurred.

Despite charges by Sanders supporters that the convention was rigged against their candidate, according to Jon Ralston, "the facts reveal that the Sanders folks disregarded rules, then when shown the truth, attacked organizers and party officials as tools of a conspiracy to defraud the senator of what was never rightfully his in the first place." After Sanders campaign Chair Jeff Weaver repeated assertions of process-rigging by Democratic Party officials, Politifact examined the evidence and concluded that, while the Party's selection process was "arcane" and "incredibly confusing", the fact is that "Clinton's supporters simply turned out (attended the Convention) in larger numbers and helped her solidify her delegate lead." Moreover, according to Politifact: "There's no clear evidence the state party 'hijacked' the process or ignored 'regular procedure.'"

The Nevada Democratic Party wrote to the Democratic National Committee accusing Sanders supporters of having a "penchant for extra-parliamentary behavior — indeed, actual violence — in place of democratic conduct in a convention setting." Sanders responded by denouncing the alleged use of violence while asserting that they were not treated with "fairness and respect" in a statement.

In a TV segment, comedian Samantha Bee reported on the fracas, as did Last Week Tonight with John Oliver and Late Night with Seth Meyers in "A Closer Look" segment.

=== Republican caucus ===
Republican caucus results by county. Donald Trump Ted Cruz

Delegates from Nevada to the Republican National Convention were allocated proportionally based on the caucus results.

Nevada Republican precinct caucuses, February 23, 2016
Candidate	Votes	Percentage	Actual delegate count		
Candidate	Votes	Percentage	Bound	Unbound	Total
Donald Trump	34,531	45.75%	14	0	14
Marco Rubio	17,940	23.77%	7	0	7
Ted Cruz	16,079	21.30%	6	0	6
Ben Carson	3,619	4.79%	2	0	2
John Kasich	2,709	3.59%	1	0	1
Invalid	266	0.35%	0	0	0
Rand Paul (withdrawn)	170	0.23%	0	0	0
Jeb Bush (withdrawn)	64	0.08%	0	0	0
Chris Christie (withdrawn)	50	0.07%	0	0	0
Carly Fiorina (withdrawn)	22	0.03%	0	0	0
Mike Huckabee (withdrawn)	21	0.03%	0	0	0
Rick Santorum (withdrawn)	11	0.01%	0	0	0
Jim Gilmore (withdrawn)			0	0	0
Unprojected delegates:			0	0	0
Total:	75,482	100.00%	30	0	30
Source: The Green Papers

== General election ==
=== Polling ===
From the first poll conducted in May 2016, and throughout the summer, the race was a complete tossup with neither Clinton nor Trump having a large lead. Clinton won most polls in the summer by 1-2 points. From late September till October 20, Clinton won or tied in every poll. On October 20, Trump won a poll 47% to 44%. The race was neck and neck until election day, with neither candidate taking a significant lead. The average of the final 3 polls had Clinton up 45.6% to 45% for Trump.

=== Predictions ===
The following are final 2016 predictions from various organizations for Nevada as of Election Day.

Source	Ranking	As of
The Cook Political Report	Lean D	November 7, 2016
Los Angeles Times	Lean D	November 6, 2016
CNN	Tossup	November 8, 2016
Rothenberg Political Report	Tilt D	November 7, 2016
Sabato's Crystal Ball	Lean D	November 7, 2016
NBC	Lean D	November 7, 2016
RealClearPolitics	Tossup	November 8, 2016
Fox News	Lean D	November 7, 2016
ABC	Lean D	November 7, 2016

=== Results ===
2016 U.S. presidential election in Nevada
Party	Candidate	Votes	%
Democratic	Hillary Clinton	539,260	47.92%
Republican	Donald Trump	512,058	45.50%
Libertarian	Gary Johnson	37,384	3.29%
	None of these candidates	28,863	2.54%
Constitution	Darrell Castle	5,268	0.46%
Reform	Rocky de la Fuente	2,552	0.23%
Total votes		1,125,385	100.00%

==== By county ====
County	Hillary Clinton Democratic		Donald Trump Republican		Various candidates Other parties		Margin		Total votes cast
County	#	%	#	%	#	%	#	%	Total votes cast
Carson City	9,610	38.42%	13,125	52.47%	2,281	9.11%	-3,515	-14.05%	25,016
Churchill	2,210	20.20%	7,830	71.59%	898	8.21%	-5,620	-51.39%	10,938
Clark	402,227	52.43%	320,057	41.72%	44,872	5.85%	82,170	10.71%	767,156
Douglas	8,454	30.32%	17,415	62.45%	2,016	7.23%	-8,961	-32.13%	27,885
Elko	3,401	18.33%	13,551	73.02%	1,607	8.65%	-10,510	-54.69%	18,559
Esmeralda	65	15.37%	329	77.78%	29	6.85%	-264	-62.41%	423
Eureka	74	8.67%	723	84.66%	57	6.67%	-649	-75.99%	854
Humboldt	1,386	21.55%	4,521	70.28%	526	8.17%	-3,135	-48.73%	6,433
Lander	403	16.70%	1,828	75.76%	182	7.54%	-1,425	-59.06%	2,413
Lincoln	285	13.37%	1,671	78.38%	176	8.25%	-1,386	-65.01%	2,132
Lyon	6,146	25.86%	16,005	67.36%	1,611	6.78%	-9,856	-41.50%	23,762
Mineral	637	31.90%	1,179	59.04%	181	9.06%	-542	-27.14%	1,997
Nye	5,094	26.00%	13,324	68.00%	1,177	6.00%	-8,230	-42.00%	19,595
Pershing	430	21.70%	1,403	70.79%	149	7.51%	-973	-49.09%	1,982
Storey	752	29.40%	1,616	63.17%	190	7.43%	-864	-33.77%	2,558
Washoe	97,379	46.39%	94,758	45.14%	17,772	8.47%	2,621	1.25%	209,909
White Pine	707	18.74%	2,723	72.17%	343	9.09%	-2,016	-53.43%	3,773
Totals	539,260	47.92%	512,058	45.50%	74,067	6.58%	27,202	2.42%	1,125,385

==== By congressional district ====
Clinton and Trump each won two of the state's four congressional districts, with Trump carrying a district that elected a Democrat in the same cycle.

District	Clinton	Trump	Representative
1st	62%	33%	Dina Titus
2nd	40%	52%	Mark Amodei
3rd	47%	48%	Joe Heck
3rd	47%	48%	Jacky Rosen
4th	49%	45%	Cresent Hardy
4th	49%	45%	Ruben Kihuen

== Analysis ==
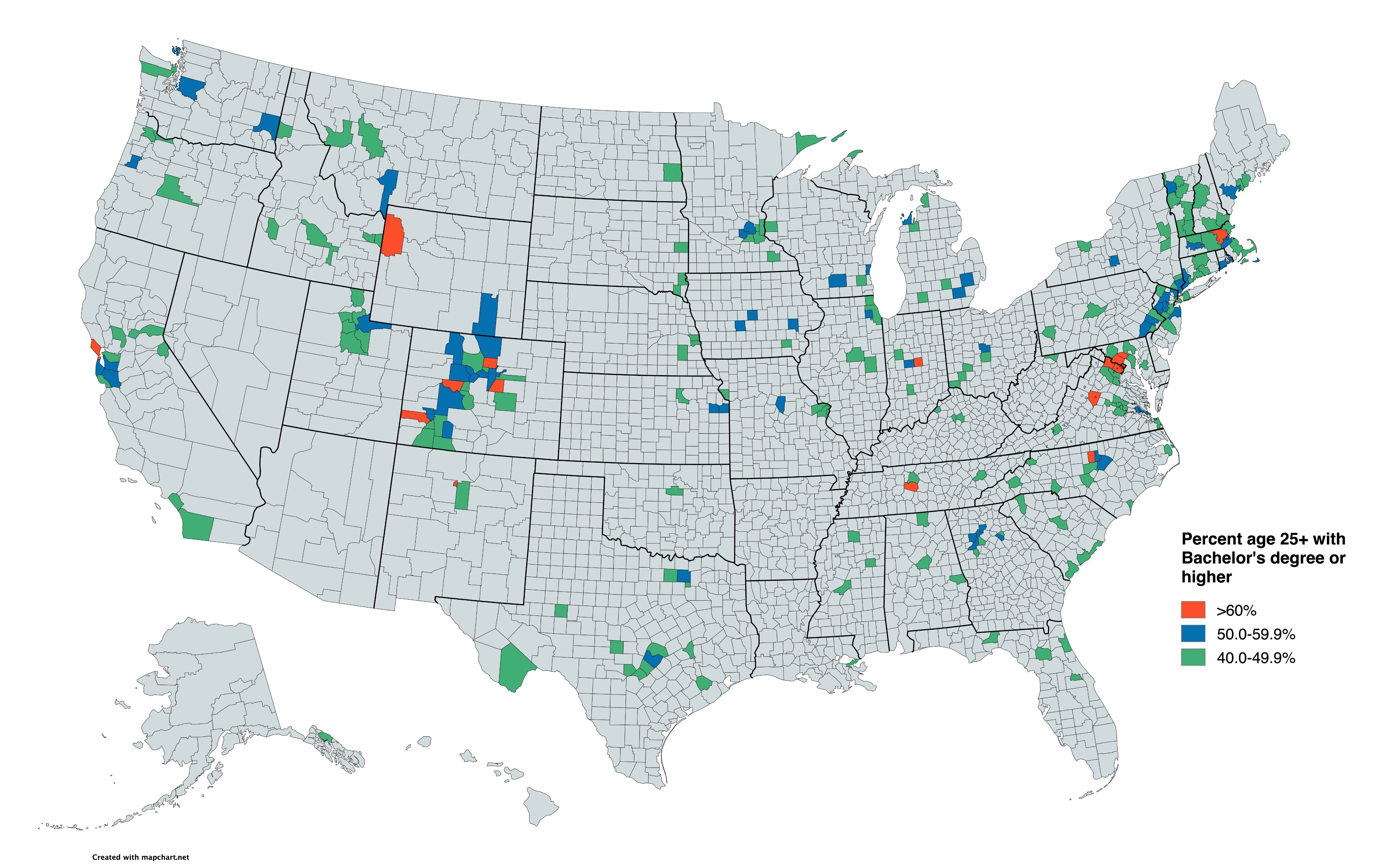
A map of the most college-educated counties in the United States

Hillary Clinton won the state over nationwide winner Donald Trump, marking the third consecutive presidential race that Nevada voted Democratic. Nevada is one of the least college-educated states in the country (see the map), and Clinton's margins declined greatly in the state's counties. However, Nevada is also a Southwestern state that is over 25% Hispanic, and Clinton's strength with Hispanics kept the state in her column.

Most counties in the state of Nevada are rural, and voted heavily for Trump. As a whole, the rural counties outside of Las Vegas and Reno gave Donald Trump a 66–27 margin. However, Clinton won the state's two most populous counties, Clark County and Washoe County, which contain about 85% of the state's population, and thus won the state's electoral votes. Compared to 2012, Clinton's margin of victory was narrower in these two counties and statewide.

This is the second time since 1908, and the only time since 1976, that Nevada voted for a losing presidential candidate.

== See also ==
- United States presidential elections in Nevada
