= Harry Mortenson =

American politician

Member of the Nevada General Assembly for the 42nd district
- In office November 1996 – November 2010

Personal details
- Born: November 24, 1930 Washington, D.C., U.S.
- Died: March 12, 2015 (aged 84) Las Vegas, Nevada, U.S.
- Party: Democratic
- Spouse: Helen H. Wood (1957-2015; his death)
- Children: 3
- Profession: Nuclear physicist

John Harry Mortenson (November 24, 1930 – March 12, 2015) was an American nuclear physicist who served as a Democratic Party member of the Nevada General Assembly.

A nuclear physicist, Mortenson, he earned a Bachelor of Science degree from the University of Maryland. He went on to study at American University and Catholic University before earning his master's degree at Duke University. He worked at Los Alamos National Laboratory from 1962 to 1971.

Mortenson and his wife Helen, a longtime consultant specializing in nuclear, radiological, and environmental issues, "fought tooth and nail" against the redevelopment of Tule Springs, a large urban Las Vegas retreat, in order "to preserve the 250,000-year-old bone fragments of such prehistoric creatures as Mammoths and giant sloths known to be at the site." They succeeded in getting the site declared the Tule Springs Fossil Beds National Monument, permanently preserving and protecting the area for research and other scientific studies.
