= Steve Yeager (politician) =

American politician (born 1978)

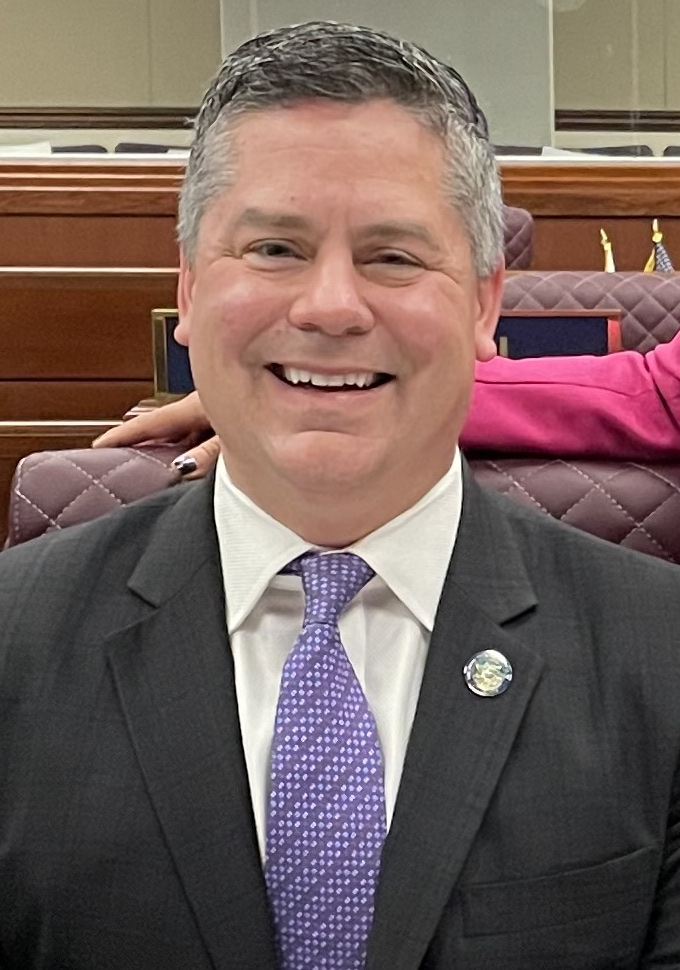

Speaker of the Nevada Assembly
- Incumbent
- Assumed office April 28, 2022 (Note: Acting: April 28, 2022 – February 6, 2023)
- Preceded by: Jason Frierson

Speaker pro tempore of the Nevada Assembly
- In office February 4, 2019 – February 6, 2023
- Preceded by: Irene Bustamante Adams
- Succeeded by: Daniele Monroe-Moreno

Member of the Nevada Assembly from the 9th district
- Incumbent
- Assumed office November 9, 2016
- Preceded by: David M. Gardner

Personal details
- Born: Steven James Yeager; October 13, 1978 (age 47) Brooklyn Center, Minnesota, U.S.
- Party: Democratic
- Spouse: Bita Yeager (m. 2013)
- Education: University of Michigan (BA); Cornell University (JD)

Steven James Yeager (born October 13, 1978) is an American politician and attorney serving as the speaker of the Nevada Assembly since 2022. A member of the Democratic Party, Yeager has represented the 9th district since 2016. His district covers parts of the southwestern Las Vegas Valley.

== Early life and education ==
Yeager was born on October 13, 1978, in Brooklyn Center, Minnesota. The second of three children, he was raised in Michigan and attended Bedford High School. His parents worked in department stores and divorced when Yeager was in junior high school.

Yeager graduated from the University of Michigan in 2001 with a Bachelor of Arts in history and Spanish. He then attended Cornell Law School, graduating with a Juris Doctor in 2004. During college, he volunteered for the 2000 presidential campaign of Al Gore.

Yeager attended and graduated from the Las Vegas Metropolitan Police Department Citizens' Police Academy in 2018 during his first term in the Nevada Assembly.

== Career ==
After law school, Yeager practiced law in Phoenix, Arizona, at the law firm Bryan Cave. He moved to Nevada in 2009 and worked as a chief deputy public defender of Clark County until his election to the Nevada Assembly in 2016. After winning his election, he became a partner and personal injury attorney at Battle Born Injury Lawyers.

Yeager first ran for the Nevada Assembly in 2014, winning the Democratic primary but losing the general election to Republican David M. Gardner. He ran for Assembly again in 2016, defeating Gardner with 55% of the vote. He has been re-elected three times since and is now serving his fourth term in the Assembly.

Yeager chaired the Assembly Judiciary Committee from 2017 to 2023 and was elected Assembly speaker pro tempore in 2019. When then-Speaker Jason Frierson resigned to became a U.S. attorney in 2022, Yeager became acting speaker. He was elected Assembly speaker in 2023.

== Personal life ==
Yeager lives in Las Vegas with his wife, Bita, who is an elected judge for the Eighth Judicial District Court in Clark County. They met in the Clark County public defender's office and married in 2013.

Yeager is an avid runner, hiker, and biker. He has a running blog called Battle Born Running.

== Political positions ==
Yeager supports increased background checks for gun purchases and also supports the legalization of marijuana.

== Electoral history ==
Nevada Assembly District 9 Democratic primary, 2014
Party	Candidate	Votes	%
Democratic	Steve Yeager	814	62.9%
Democratic	Joe Tinio	240	18.6%
Democratic	Kelly W. Mercer	239	18.5%
Total votes		1,293	100.0%

Nevada Assembly District 9 election, 2014
Party	Candidate	Votes	%
Republican	David M. Gardner	5,630	52.1%
Democratic	Steve Yeager	5,176	47.9%
Total votes		10,806	100.0%

Nevada Assembly District 9 election, 2016
Party	Candidate	Votes	%
Democratic	Steve Yeager	15,181	55.3%
Republican	David M. Gardner	12,262	44.7%
Total votes		27,443	100.0%

== Notes ==
Nevada Assembly
Preceded by Irene Bustamante Adams	Speaker pro tempore of the Nevada Assembly; 2019–2023	Succeeded by Daniele Monroe-Moreno
Political offices
Preceded by Jason Frierson	Speaker of the Nevada Assembly; 2022–present Acting: 2022–2023	Incumbent
