= 2014 Nevada Attorney General election =

- November 4, 2014
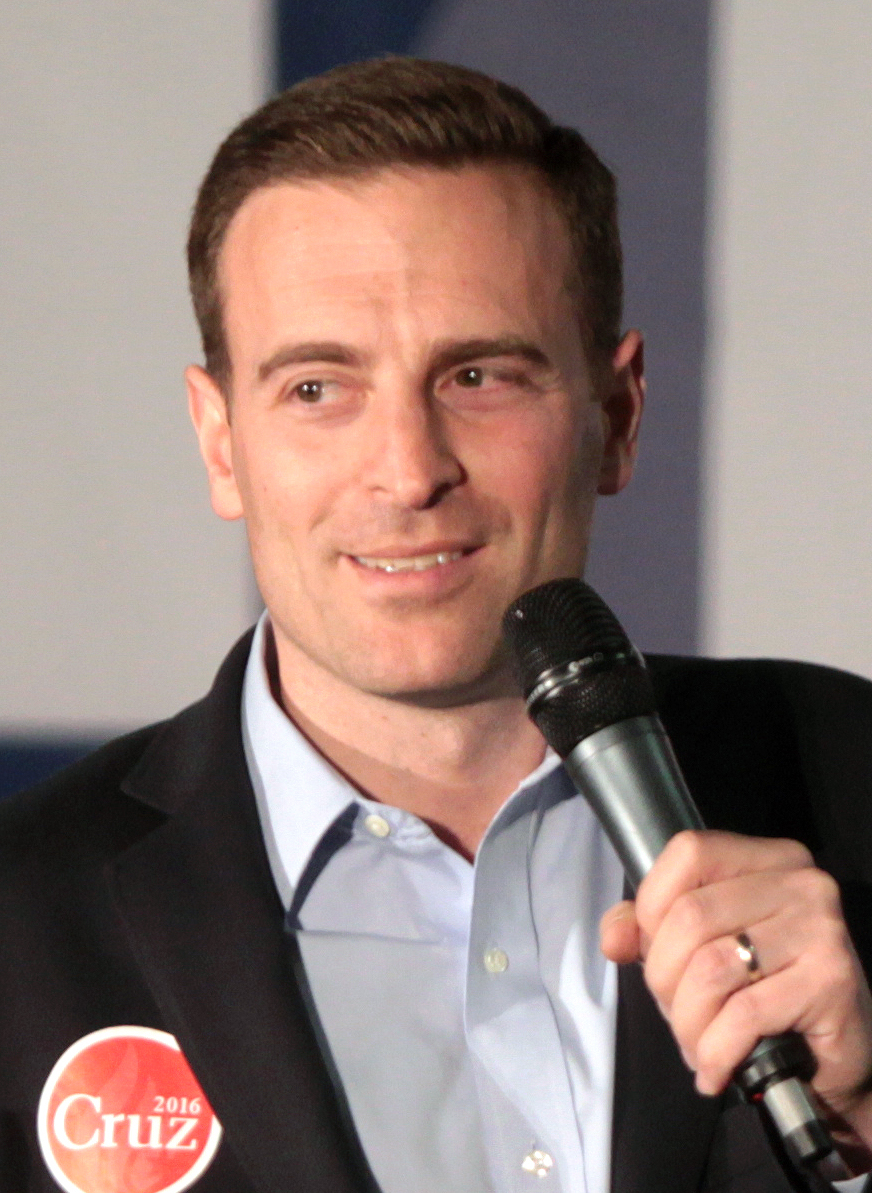

Nominee	Adam Laxalt	Ross Miller	Jonathan Hansen
Party	Republican	Democratic	Independent American
Popular vote	251,379	246,629	30,513
Percentage	46.20%	45.32%	5.61%
- County results Laxalt: 40–50% 50–60% 60–70% Miller: 40–50%
Attorney General before election
Catherine Cortez Masto
Democratic
Elected Attorney General
Adam Laxalt
Republican

The 2014 Nevada Attorney General election took place on November 4, 2014, to elect the Attorney General of Nevada. Incumbent Democratic Attorney General Catherine Cortez Masto was ineligible to run for re-election for a third term due to term limits from the Constitution of Nevada. Republican attorney Adam Laxalt defeated Democratic secretary of state Ross Miller with 46.2% of the vote. Until the 2022 Nevada gubernatorial election, this was the most recent time a Republican won a Nevada statewide election while carrying neither Clark nor Washoe Counties.

== Democratic primary ==
=== Candidates ===
==== Nominee ====
- Ross Miller, Secretary of State of Nevada and son of former governor Bob Miller

== Republican primary ==
=== Candidates ===
==== Nominee ====
- Adam Laxalt, attorney, son of former U.S. Senator Pete Domenici and grandson of former governor Paul Laxalt

== Independent American primary ==
=== Candidates ===
==== Nominee ====
- Jonathan Hansen, attorney

== General election ==
=== Debate ===
2014 Nevada Attorney General debate
No.	Date	Host	Moderator	Link	Democratic	Republican
Key: P Participant A Absent N Not invited I Invited W Withdrawn						
Key: P Participant A Absent N Not invited I Invited W Withdrawn					Ross Miller	Adam Laxalt
1	October 10, 2014	PBS Vegas	Steve Sebelius; Elizabeth Thompson	YouTube	P	P

=== Polling ===
Poll source	Date(s) administered	Sample size (Note: Key: A – all adults RV – registered voters LV – likely voters V – unclear)	Margin of error	Ross Miller (D)	Adam Laxalt (R)	Other	Undecided
Precision Research	March 3–5, 2014	216 (LV)	± 6.7%	44%	36%	–	20%

=== Results ===
2014 Nevada Attorney General election
Party	Candidate	Votes	%	±%
Republican	Adam Laxalt	251,479	46.20%	+10.53%
Democratic	Ross Miller	246,629	45.32%	−7.50%
Independent American	Jonathan Hansen	30,513	5.61%	−2.20%
None of These Candidates		15,629	2.87%	−0.83%
Total votes		544,150	100.0%	
Republican gain from Democratic				

== See also ==
- Nevada Attorney General
