= 2024 United States Senate election in Nevada =

- November 5, 2024
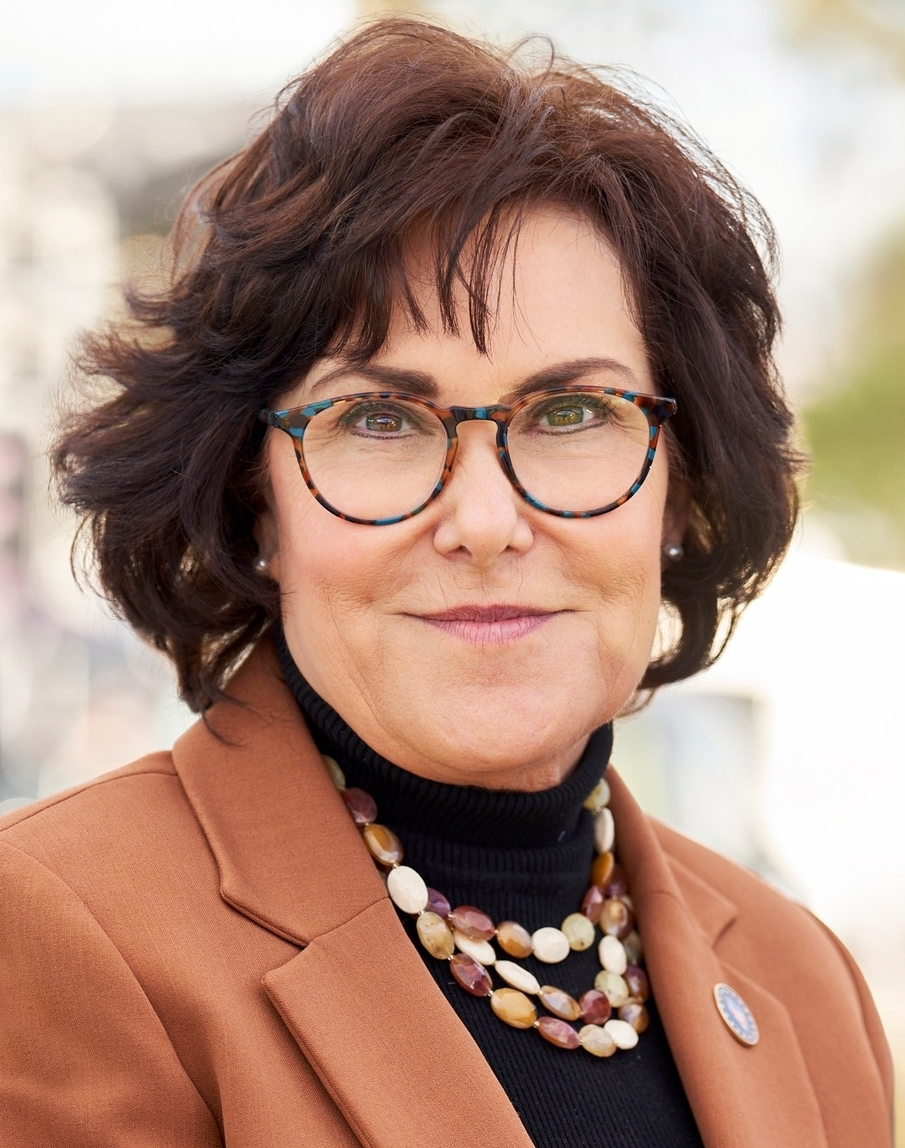

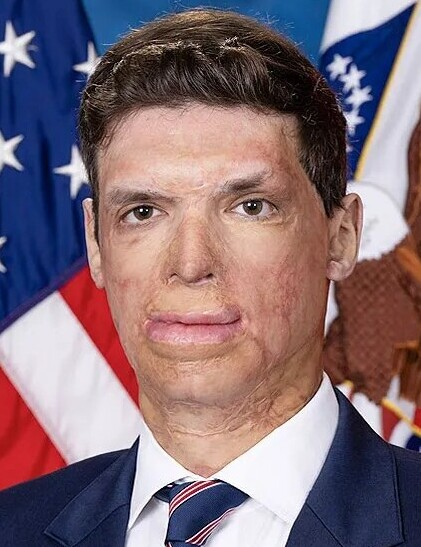
Nominee	Jacky Rosen	Sam Brown
Party	Democratic	Republican
Popular vote	701,105	677,046
Percentage	47.87%	46.22%
- Rosen: 40–50% 50–60% 60–70% 70–80% 80–90% >90% Brown: 40–50% 50–60% 60–70% 70–80% 80–90% >90% Tie: 40–50% 50% No votes
U.S. senator before election
Jacky Rosen
Democratic
Elected U.S. Senator
Jacky Rosen
Democratic

The 2024 United States Senate election in Nevada was held on November 5, 2024, to elect a member of the United States Senate to represent the State of Nevada. Incumbent Democratic Senator Jacky Rosen narrowly won re-election to a second term, defeating Republican nominee Sam Brown. Republican presidential nominee Donald Trump carried Nevada on the same ballot. Primary elections took place on June 11, 2024.

Incumbent Democratic senator Jacky Rosen was running for reelection to a second term in office, facing a strong challenge from Republican author and U.S. Army veteran Sam Brown. Brown was endorsed by Donald Trump, who was running for the presidency up the ballot. Given Nevada's status as a crucial swing state at the federal level, a competitive race was anticipated; although, Rosen led most all of preelection polling, and almost all major news organizations and firms predicted that she was likely to win, albeit by varying levels of confidence.

Come Election Day, Rosen was reelected by a narrow margin of around 1.7%, an advantage of around 24,000 votes among over 1.46 million cast statewide. This result reflected a somewhat more competitive result than expected, according to final polling averages, and was down from her 2018 margin of around 5 points against then-incumbent Republican senator Dean Heller. Rosen received 47.9% of the statewide vote to Brown's 46.2%. Rosen's victory came on the same ballot in which Democrat Kamala Harris lost the state of Nevada in the concurrent presidential election by 3.1%, becoming the first Democrat to do so since 2004.

To compare to the presidential race, Rosen ultimately overperformed Harris by around 4.8 percentage points. Rosen carried two of Nevada's seventeen counties – Clark County, home to Las Vegas and its suburbs, and Washoe County, home to Reno and its suburbs – which is somewhat of a traditional result in the state, as Harris did the same in the presidential election; however, their margins differed notably. Rosen carried Clark and Washoe counties by margins of 7.3% and 5.8% respectively, while Harris only carried them by 2.6% and 1.0% respectively. Rosen received around 4,000 fewer votes than Harris, while Brown received over 74,000 fewer votes than Trump.

== Background ==
A typical swing state, Nevada is considered to be a purple state at the federal level, especially since in the 2016 United States presidential election, when Hillary Clinton carried Nevada by about two percentage points. Both parties have seen success in the state in recent years. Democrats control both U.S. Senate seats, majorities in both state legislative chambers, and all but one seat in its congressional delegation, while Republicans flipped the governorship and lieutenant governorship in 2022.

As of 2024, no Republican has won any U.S. Senate race in Nevada since 2012. This race was considered to be highly competitive given the state's nearly even partisan lean; however, most polls and ratings showed Rosen to be the favorite to win.

== Democratic primary ==
=== Candidates ===
==== Nominee ====
- Jacky Rosen, incumbent U.S. senator

==== Eliminated in primary ====
- Mike Schaefer, member of the California State Board of Equalization from the 4th district (2019–present) and perennial candidate
- Troy Zakari Walker, business consultant

=== Endorsements ===
Jacky Rosen

U.S. representatives

- Gabby Giffords, U.S. representative from Arizona's 8th congressional district (2007–2012)

Statewide officials

- Andy Beshear, Governor of Kentucky (2019–present)
- Gretchen Whitmer, Governor of Michigan (2019–present)

Individuals

- Cristina Tzintzún Ramirez, labor organizer and president of NextGen America PAC (2021–present)

Labor unions

- AFSCME Nevada
- Culinary Workers Union
- LiUNA Local 872
- National Education Association
- Nevada AFL-CIO

Organizations

- 314 Action
- American Israel Public Affairs Committee (AIPAC)
- Bend the Arc
- CHC BOLD PAC
- Democratic Majority for Israel
- EMILY's List
- End Citizens United
- Feminist Majority PAC
- Giffords
- Human Rights Campaign
- Humane Society Legislative Fund
- Jewish Democratic Council of America
- Joint Action Committee for Political Affairs
- League of Conservation Voters
- National Organization for Women PAC
- National Women's Political Caucus
- Natural Resources Defense Council
- NextGen America PAC
- Planned Parenthood Action Fund
- Population Connection Action Fund
- Reproductive Freedom for All
- Sierra Club
- Silver State Equality
- Swing Left

Newspapers

- Las Vegas Sun (Democratic primary only)
- Las Vegas Weekly (Democratic primary only)

=== Fundraising ===
Campaign finance reports as of May 22, 2024
Candidate	Raised	Spent	Cash on hand
Jacky Rosen (D)	$27,387,983	$17,316,743	$10,249,429
Troy Walker (D)	$705	$675	$0
Source: Federal Election Commission

=== Results ===
Primary results by county: Rosen: 60–70%; 70–80%; 80–90%; >90%

Democratic primary results
Party	Candidate	Votes	%
Democratic	Jacky Rosen (incumbent)	144,090	91.51%
Democratic	Troy Zakari Walker	5,899	3.75%
Democratic	None of These Candidates	3,951	2.51%
Democratic	Mike Schaefer	3,521	2.24%
Total votes		157,461	100.0%

== Republican primary ==
=== Candidates ===
==== Nominee ====
- Sam Brown, medical support company founder, candidate for U.S. Senate in 2022, and candidate for Texas's 102nd House of Representatives district in 2014

==== Eliminated in primary ====
- William Conrad, former city councilor in Modesto, California, and candidate for U.S. Senate in 2022
- Tony Grady Jr., Reno Air Races director of flight operations and candidate for lieutenant governor in 2022
- Jeffrey Ross Gunter, former U.S. Ambassador to Iceland (2019–2021)
- Edward Hamilton, businessman and perennial candidate
- Ronda Kennedy, civil rights attorney and perennial candidate
- Barry Lindemann, real estate developer and independent candidate for U.S. Senate in 2022
- Garn Mabey, former Minority Leader of the Nevada Assembly (2007) for the 2nd district (2003–2009) and candidate for U.S. Senate in 2010
- Jim Marchant, former state assemblyman for the 37th district (2016–2018), founder of the America First Secretary of State Coalition, nominee for Secretary of State in 2022, and nominee for Nevada's 4th congressional district in 2020
- Gary Marinch, real estate investor and perennial candidate
- Stephanie Phillips, real estate broker
- Vincent Rego, delivery driver

==== Declined ====
- Mark Amodei, U.S. representative for Nevada's 2nd congressional district (2011–present) (ran for re-election)
- April Becker, attorney and nominee for Nevada's 3rd congressional district in 2022 (ran for Clark County Commission)
- Heidi Gansert, Minority Leader of the Nevada Senate
- Adam Laxalt, former Nevada Attorney General (2015–2019), grandson of former U.S. Senator Paul Laxalt, nominee for U.S. Senate in 2022, and nominee for governor in 2018
- Brian Sandoval, president of University of Nevada, Reno (2020–present) and former governor of Nevada (2011–2019)

=== Endorsements ===
Sam Brown

Executive branch officials

- George W. Bush, 43rd President of the United States (2001–2009)
- Donald Trump, 45th President of the United States (2017–2021)

U.S. senators

- Marsha Blackburn, U.S. senator from Tennessee (2019–present)
- Tom Cotton, U.S. senator from Arkansas (2015–present)
- Steve Daines, U.S. senator from Montana (2015–present)
- Markwayne Mullin, U.S. senator from Oklahoma (2023–2026)
- John Thune, U.S. senator from South Dakota (2005–present)

Statewide officials

- Joe Lombardo, Governor of Nevada (2023–present)

Organizations

- Americans for Prosperity
- The LIBRE Initiative
- Senate Conservatives Fund
Jeffrey Ross Gunter

U.S. representatives

- Matt Gaetz, U.S. Representative for FL-1 (2017–2024)
- Lee Zeldin, former U.S. representative for NY-1 (2015–2023)
Jim Marchant

Executive branch officials

- Michael Flynn, former U.S. National Security Advisor (2017) and former Director of the Defense Intelligence Agency (2012–2014)

U.S. representatives

- Paul Gosar, U.S. representative for AZ-9 (2011–present)

Individuals

- Dick Morris, commentator and former advisor to President Bill Clinton
- Wayne Allyn Root, conservative TV host and conspiracy theorist
Garn Mabey

Newspapers

- Las Vegas Sun (Republican primary only)
- Las Vegas Weekly (Republican primary only)

=== Polling ===
Poll source	Date(s) administered	Sample size (Note: Key: A – all adults RV – registered voters LV – likely voters V – unclear)	Margin of error	Sam Brown	Tony Grady	Jeff Gunter	Jim Marchant	Other	Undecided
Noble Predictive Insights	June 4–5, 2024	424 (LV)	± 4.8%	50%	4%	15%	8%	12% (Note: "Another candidate not listed" with 7%; "Refused/Would not vote" with 5%)	12%
Kaplan Strategies (Note: Poll sponsored by Gunter's campaign)	May 30, 2024	802 (LV)	± 3.5%	30%	4%	31%	7%	1% (Note: Bill Conrad with 1%; Ronda Kennedy with 0%)	27%
Tarrance Group (R) (Note: Poll sponsored by the National Republican Senatorial Committee, which supports Brown)	May 13–16, 2024	500 (LV)	± 4.5%	52%	–	14%	7%	–	27%
Tarrance Group (R)	April 7–10, 2024	500 (LV)	± 4.5%	58%	3%	3%	6%	–	29%
Noble Predictive Insights	February 27 – March 5, 2024	296 (RV)	± 5.7%	39%	–	–	26%	–	35%
Tarrance Group (R)	October 23–26, 2023	600 (LV)	± 4.1%	24%	5%	1%	9%	–	41%
Public Opinion Strategies (R) (Note: Poll sponsored by Duty First Super PAC, which supports Brown)	August 15–17, 2023	500 (LV)	± 4.4%	33%	2%	1%	15%	3% (Note: Bill Conrad, Ronda Kennedy, and Barry Lindemann with 1%)	44%

=== Fundraising ===
Campaign finance reports as of May 22, 2024
Candidate	Raised	Spent	Cash on hand
Sam Brown (R)	$7,084,690	$4,605,289	$2,479,400
William Conrad (R)	$12,476 (Note: $2,100 of this total was self-funded by Conrad)	$7,098	$9,161
Tony Grady Jr. (R)	$278,061	$255,593	$22,467
Jeffrey Ross Gunter (R)	$3,317,546 (Note: $2,725,000 of this total was self-funded by Gunter)	$2,980,286	$337,260
Ronda Kennedy (R)	$27,786 (Note: $21,600 of this total was self-funded by Kennedy)	$18,620	$9,165
Barry Lindemann (R)	$64,106	$63,947	$2,783
Jim Marchant (R)	$434,323	$374,665	$59,657
Stephanie Phillips (R)	$82,761	$81,427	$1,333
Source: Federal Election Commission

=== Results ===
Primary results by county Brown: 40–50%; 50–60%; 60–70%; 70–80%

Republican primary results
Party	Candidate	Votes	%
Republican	Sam Brown	103,102	60.17%
Republican	Jeffrey Ross Gunter	24,987	14.58%
Republican	Jim Marchant	11,190	6.53%
Republican	Tony Grady Jr.	9,565	5.58%
Republican	None of These Candidates	7,164	4.18%
Republican	William Conrad	6,038	3.52%
Republican	Stephanie Phillips	3,828	2.23%
Republican	Garn Mabey	1,818	1.06%
Republican	Ronda Kennedy	1,786	1.04%
Republican	Barry Lindemann	852	0.50%
Republican	Edward Hamilton	478	0.28%
Republican	Vincent Rego	311	0.18%
Republican	Gary Marinch	231	0.13%
Total votes		171,350	100.0%

== Third-party and independent candidates ==
=== Declared ===
- Chris Cunningham (Libertarian), ecommerce consultant and esports commentator
- Joseph Destin (Independent), truck driver and candidate for U.S. Senate in 2022
- Janine Hansen (Independent American), former Constitution Party national treasurer and perennial candidate
- Chris Mazlo (Independent)
- Allen Rheinhart (Independent), artist and perennial candidate
- Ed Uehling (Independent), real estate investor and perennial candidate

=== Fundraising ===
Campaign finance reports as of May 22, 2024
Candidate	Raised	Spent	Cash on hand
Chris Cunningham (L)	$800	$16	$809
Source: Federal Election Commission

== General election ==
=== Predictions ===
Source	Ranking	As of
The Cook Political Report	Lean D	August 15, 2024
Inside Elections	Lean D	October 18, 2024
Sabato's Crystal Ball	Lean D	November 9, 2023
Decision Desk HQ/The Hill	Lean D	October 3, 2024
Elections Daily	Likely D	October 9, 2024
CNalysis	Lean D	November 4, 2024
RealClearPolitics	Tossup	October 18, 2024
Split Ticket	Likely D	October 23, 2024
538	Likely D	October 23, 2024

=== Post-primary endorsements ===
Jacky Rosen (D)

U.S. representatives

- Adam Schiff, U.S. Representative from California's 30th congressional district (2001–2024)

Individuals

- Bryan Cranston, actor
- Harry Dunn, former U.S. Capitol Police officer

Labor unions

- Actors' Equity Association

Newspapers

- Las Vegas Sun
Sam Brown (R)

Individuals

- Ben Shapiro, podcaster

=== Debates ===
2024 Nevada U.S. Senate election debate
No.	Date	Host	Moderators	Link	Democratic	Republican
Key: P Participant A Absent N Not invited I Invited W Withdrawn						
Key: P Participant A Absent N Not invited I Invited W Withdrawn					Rosen	Brown
1	October 17, 2024	KLAS-TV		YouTube	P	P

=== Fundraising ===
Campaign finance reports as of October 16, 2024
Candidate	Raised	Spent	Cash on hand
Jacky Rosen (D)	$46,500,385	$44,212,365	$2,466,209
Sam Brown (R)	$20,000,962	$17,751,273	$2,249,688
Source: Federal Election Commission

=== Polling ===
Aggregate polls

Source of poll aggregation	Dates administered	Dates updated	Jacky Rosen (D)	Sam Brown (R)	Undecided (Note: Calculated by taking the difference of 100% and all other candidates combined.)	Margin
FiveThirtyEight	through November 4, 2024	November 4, 2024	49.2%	43.4%	7.4%	Rosen +5.8%
RealClearPolitics	October 24 – November 4, 2024	November 4, 2024	48.8%	43.9%	7.3%	Rosen +4.9%
270toWin	October 22 – November 4, 2024	November 4, 2024	48.7%	44.2%	7.1%	Rosen +4.5%
TheHill/DDHQ	through November 4, 2024	November 4, 2024	48.6%	44.7%	6.7%	Rosen +3.9%
Average			48.8%	44.1%	7.1%	Rosen +4.7%

Poll source	Date(s) administered	Sample size	Margin of error	Jacky Rosen (D)	Sam Brown (R)	Other	Undecided
AtlasIntel	November 3–4, 2024	707 (LV)	± 4.0%	48%	43%	4% (Note: "Blank/Null/Won't vote" with 3%; "Other" with 1%)	5%
Patriot Polling (R)	November 1–3, 2024	792 (RV)	± 3.0%	51%	48%	–	–
AtlasIntel	November 1–2, 2024	782 (LV)	± 4.0%	46%	46%	5% (Note: "Blank/Null/Won't vote" with 4%; "Other" with 1%)	4%
Emerson College (Note: Poll sponsored by Nexstar Media)	October 30 – November 2, 2024	840 (LV)	± 3.3%	50%	44%	3% (Note: "None of these candidate" with 3%)	3%
New York Times/Siena College	October 24 – November 2, 2024	1,010 (LV)	± 3.6%	52%	43%	–	5%
New York Times/Siena College	October 24 – November 2, 2024	1,010 (RV)	± 3.4%	52%	40%	–	8%
AtlasIntel	October 30–31, 2024	845 (LV)	± 3.0%	47%	45%	5%	3%
Emerson College (Note: Poll sponsored by RealClearWorld)	October 29–31, 2024	700 (LV)	± 3.6%	49%	45%	2% (Note: "None of these candidates" with 2%)	4%
Noble Predictive Insights	October 28–31, 2024	593 (LV)	± 4.0%	48%	46%	5% (Note: "None of these candidates" with 2%; Cunningham (L) and Hansen (IA) with 1%; "Refused" with 1%)	2%
Susquehanna Polling & Research (R)	October 28–31, 2024	400 (LV)	± 4.9%	46%	47%	5% (Note: "Refuse" with 4%; "Other" with 1%)	2%
YouGov (Note: Poll sponsored by The Times, Stanford University, Arizona State University, and Yale University)	October 25–31, 2024	753 (LV)	± 4.6%	51%	44%	–	5%
Rasmussen Reports (R) (Note: Poll sponsored by American Thinker)	October 25–30, 2024	767 (LV)	± 3.0%	50%	41%	3% (Note: "Other" with 3%)	6%
Data for Progress (D)	October 25–30, 2024	721 (LV)	± 4.0%	49%	42%	4% (Note: Hansen (IA) with 2%; "None of these candidates" with 2%)	4%
AtlasIntel	October 25–29, 2024	1,083 (LV)	± 3.0%	49%	44%	4%	3%
The Trafalgar Group (R)	October 25–28, 2024	1,082 (LV)	± 2.9%	47%	45%	3% (Note: "Other" with 3%)	6%
CNN/SRSS	October 21–26, 2024	683 (LV)	± 4.6%	50%	41%	8% (Note: "Other" with 7%; "Neither" with 1%)	1%
OnMessage Inc. (R) (Note: Poll sponsored by Senate Opportunity Fund, a super PAC that primarily supports Republican candidates in U.S. Senate races)	October 19–22, 2024	600 (LV)	± 4.0%	48%	48%	2% (Note: Cunningham (L) and Hansen (IA) with 1%)	3%
InsiderAdvantage (R)	October 19–20, 2024	800 (LV)	± 3.5%	48%	44%	4% (Note: "Another candidate" with 4%)	4%
Redfield & Wilton Strategies (Note: Poll sponsored by The Daily Telegraph)	October 16–18, 2024	529 (LV)	± 3.9%	48%	41%	4% (Note: "Won't vote if these are the candidates" with 2%; Cunningham (L) and Hansen (IA) with 1%)	6%
AtlasIntel	October 12–17, 2024	1,171 (LV)	± 3.0%	47%	43%	3% (Note: "Blank/Null/Won't vote" with 2%; "Other" with 1%)	6%
Fabrizio Ward (R)/ Impact Research (D) (Note: Poll sponsored by AARP)	October 8–15, 2024	600 (LV)	± 4.0%	49%	44%	4% (Note: "None of these Candidates" with 4%)	3%
Morning Consult	October 6–15, 2024	496 (LV)	± 4.0%	52%	37%	–	6%
Redfield & Wilton Strategies	October 12–14, 2024	838 (LV)	± 3.1%	46%	41%	5% (Note: "Won't vote if these are the candidates" with 2%; Cunningham (L) and Hansen (IA) with 1%; "Other" with 1%)	7%
Rasmussen Reports (R)	October 9–14, 2024	748 (LV)	± 3.0%	47%	44%	–	9%
The Trafalgar Group (R)	October 10–13, 2024	1,088 (LV)	± 2.9%	48%	43%	3%	6%
Emerson College (Note: Poll sponsored by The Hill)	October 5–8, 2024	900 (LV)	± 3.2%	50%	42%	3% (Note: "None of these candidates" with 3%)	5%
RMG Research (Note: Poll sponsored by the Napolitan Institute)	September 30 – October 3, 2024	782 (LV)	± 3.5%	53%	37%	3% (Note: "Someone else" with 2%; "Would not vote" with 1%)	7%
RMG Research	September 30 – October 3, 2024	782 (LV)	± 3.5%	56% (Note: With voters who lean towards a given candidate)	40%	1% (Note: "Would not vote" with 1%)	4%
Redfield & Wilton Strategies	September 27 – October 2, 2024	514 (LV)	± 4.0%	48%	41%	5% (Note: "Won't vote if these are the candidates" with 2%; Cunningham (L) with 1%; Hansen (IA) with 1%; "Other" with 1%)	7%
InsiderAdvantage (R)	September 29–30, 2024	800 (LV)	± 3.5%	49%	42%	2% (Note: "Another candidate" with 2%)	7%
AtlasIntel	September 20–25, 2024	858 (LV)	± 3.0%	48%	46%	3% (Note: "Blank/Null/Won't vote" with 3%; "Other" with <1%)	3%
BSG (R)/GS Strategy Group (D) (Note: Poll sponsored by The Cook Political Report)	September 19–25, 2024	409 (LV)	–	52%	38%	4% (Note: "Someone else" with 2%; "Would not vote" with 2%)	6%
BSG (R)/GS Strategy Group (D)	September 19–25, 2024	409 (LV)	–	53%	40%	–	7%
Rasmussen Reports (R)	September 19–22, 2024	738 (LV)	± 3.0%	50%	40%	4% (Note: "Other" with 4%)	7%
Remington Research Group (R) (Note: Poll sponsored by American Fuel & Petrochemical Manufacturers, a group that supports Republicans.)	September 16–20, 2024	800 (LV)	± 3.5%	47%	41%	–	12%
Redfield & Wilton Strategies	September 16–19, 2024	652 (LV)	± 3.5%	47%	38%	4% (Note: Hansen (IA), "Wouldn't vote if these are the candidates", Cunningham (L), and "Other" with 1%)	11%
The Tarrance Group (R)	September 16–19, 2024	600 (LV)	± 4.1%	48%	41%	4% (Note: "None of the above" with 3%; "Others" with 1%)	6%
Emerson College	September 15–18, 2024	895 (LV)	± 3.2%	48%	41%	3%	9%
Morning Consult	September 9–18, 2024	474 (LV)	± 5.0%	52%	39%	–	9%
Noble Predictive Insights	September 9–16, 2024	692 (LV)	± 3.7%	53%	38%	–	9%
Noble Predictive Insights	September 9–16, 2024	692 (LV)	± 3.7%	50%	36%	6% (Note: "Wouldn't vote for these candidates" with 3%; Cunningham (L) with 2%; Hansen (IA) with 1%)	7%
Noble Predictive Insights	September 9–16, 2024	812 (RV)	± 3.4%	52%	34%	–	15%
Noble Predictive Insights	September 9–16, 2024	812 (RV)	± 3.4%	49%	33%	8% (Note: "Wouldn't vote for these candidates" with 5%; Cunningham (L) with 2%; Hansen (IA) with 1%)	10%
The Trafalgar Group (R)	September 11–13, 2024	1,079 (LV)	± 2.9%	48%	40%	7% (Note: "Other" with 7%)	4%
Redfield & Wilton Strategies	September 6–9, 2024	698 (LV)	± 4.1%	47%	39%	5% (Note: Hansen (IA) and "Wouldn't vote if these are the candidates" with 2%; Cunningham (L) with 1%)	9%
Morning Consult	August 30 – September 8, 2024	516 (LV)	± 4.0%	50%	40%	–	10%
YouGov	August 23 – September 3, 2024	800 (RV)	± 4.7%	51%	39%	–	10%
InsiderAdvantage (R)	August 29–31, 2024	800 (LV)	± 3.5%	49%	39%	2%	10%
CNN/SRSS	August 23–29, 2024	626 (LV)	± 4.9%	50%	40%	9% (Note: "Other" with 7%; "Neither" with 2%)	1%
Redfield & Wilton Strategies	August 25–28, 2024	490 (LV)	± 4.1%	43%	39%	4% (Note: Hansen (IA) with 2%; Cunningham (L) with 1%; "Wouldn't vote if these are the candidates" with 1%)	14%
Emerson College	August 25–28, 2024	1,168 (LV)	± 2.8%	50%	40%	4%	6%
Fox News	August 23–26, 2024	1,026 (RV)	± 3.0%	55%	41%	3% (Note: "Other" with 2%; "Wouldn't vote" with 1%)	1%
Redfield & Wilton Strategies	August 12–15, 2024	536 (LV)	± 3.9%	41%	37%	5% (Note: Janine Hansen (IA) and Chris Cunningham (L) with 2%; "Other (Another Third Party/Write-In)" with 1%)	19%
Rasmussen Reports (R) (Note: Poll sponsored by NumbersUSA)	August 13–18, 2024	980 (LV)	± 3.0%	50%	39%	5% (Note: "Someone else" with 5%)	6%
New York Times/Siena College	August 12–15, 2024	677 (RV)	± 4.2%	48%	37%	–	15%
New York Times/Siena College	August 12–15, 2024	677 (LV)	± 4.4%	49%	40%	–	11%
Strategies 360	August 7–14, 2024	350 (RV)	± 5.2%	50%	38%	5% (Note: Chris Cunningham (L) with 3%; "None of These Candidates" with 2%)	6%
Providence Polling	August 3–5, 2024	991 (LV)	± 3.0%	52%	40%	9% (Note: "None of These Candidates" with 6%; "Other Candidates" with 3%)	–
Redfield & Wilton Strategies	July 31 – August 3, 2024	470 (LV)	± 4.2%	41%	38%	3% (Note: Janine Hansen (IA) with 2%; Chris Cunningham (L) with 1%)	19%
BSG (R)/GS Strategy Group (D)	July 26 – August 2, 2024	403 (LV)	–	54%	36%	–	10%
Redfield & Wilton Strategies	July 22–24, 2024	435 (LV)	± 4.14%	45%	40%	3%	10%
	July 21, 2024	Joe Biden withdraws from the presidential election					
Redfield & Wilton Strategies	July 16–18, 2024	412 (LV)	–	41%	37%	4% (Note: Chris Cunningham (L) and Janine Hansen (IA) with 2%)	16%
Rasmussen Reports (R) (Note: Poll sponsored by The Heartland Institute)	July 5–12, 2024	761 (LV)	± 3.0%	45%	42%	6% (Note: "Other" with 6%)	7%
YouGov	July 4–12, 2024	800 (RV)	± 4.7%	47%	40%	1% (Note: "Other" with 1%)	11%
YouGov	July 4–12, 2024	731 (LV)	–	47%	41%	1%	10%
Remington Research Group (R)	June 29 – July 1, 2024	601 (LV)	± 4.0%	48%	46%	–	6%
National Public Affairs	June 28 – July 1, 2024	817 (LV)	± 3.4%	41%	33%	8% (Note: "None of these candidates" with 8%)	18%
Emerson College	June 13–18, 2024	1,000 (RV)	± 3.0%	50%	38%	–	13%
Fabrizio Ward (R)/ Impact Research (D)	June 12–18, 2024	600 (LV)	± 4.0%	47%	42%	–	11%
	June 11, 2024	Primary elections held					
The Tyson Group (R) (Note: Poll sponsored by Breaking Battlegrounds)	May 22–25, 2024	601 (LV)	± 4.0%	47%	33%	4% (Note: Chris Cunningham (L) with 4%)	16%
Mainstreet Research/FAU	May 19–21, 2024	522 (RV)	± 4.3%	48%	35%	8% (Note: "Another candidate" with 8%)	9%
Mainstreet Research/FAU	May 19–21, 2024	494 (LV)	± 4.3%	48%	37%	7% (Note: "Another candidate" with 7%)	8%
New York Times/Siena College	April 28 – May 9, 2024	614 (RV)	± 4.0%	40%	38%	–	22%
New York Times/Siena College	April 28 – May 9, 2024	614 (LV)	± 4.0%	41%	41%	–	18%
Emerson College	April 25–29, 2024	1,000 (RV)	± 3.0%	45%	37%	–	18%
Emerson College	March 12–15, 2024	1,000 (RV)	± 3.0%	41%	39%	–	21%
Noble Predictive Insights	February 27 – March 5, 2024	829 (RV)	± 3.4%	41%	35%	–	24%
Emerson College	February 16–19, 2024	1,000 (RV)	± 3.0%	40%	38%	–	22%
Change Research (D)	December 3–7, 2023	2,532 (V)	–	39%	38%	0%	23%
Tarrance Group (R)	October 23–26, 2023	600 (LV)	± 4.1%	45%	40%	5%	10%

Hypothetical polling

Jacky Rosen vs. Jim Marchant

Poll source	Date(s) administered	Sample size	Margin of error	Jacky Rosen (D)	Jim Marchant (R)	Other	Undecided
Emerson College	March 12–15, 2024	1,000 (RV)	± 3.0%	44%	34%	–	22%
Noble Predictive Insights	February 27 – March 5, 2024	829 (RV)	± 3.4%	43%	34%	–	23%
Emerson College	February 16–19, 2024	1,000 (RV)	± 3.0%	42%	36%	–	22%

Jacky Rosen vs. Jeff Gunter

Poll source	Date(s) administered	Sample size	Margin of error	Jacky Rosen (D)	Jeff Gunter (R)	Other	Undecided
Emerson College	April 25–29, 2024	1,000 (RV)	± 3.0%	47%	33%	–	21%
Emerson College	March 12–15, 2024	1,000 (RV)	± 3.0%	43%	34%	–	23%
Emerson College	February 16–19, 2024	1,000 (RV)	± 3.0%	43%	32%	–	25%

=== Results ===
2024 United States Senate election in Nevada
Party	Candidate	Votes	%	±%
Democratic	Jacky Rosen (incumbent)	701,105	47.87%	−2.54%
Republican	Sam Brown	677,046	46.22%	+0.84%
None of These Candidates		44,380	3.03%	+1.46%
Independent American	Janine Hansen	21,316	1.46%	+0.73%
Libertarian	Chris Cunningham	20,881	1.43%	+0.48%
Total votes		1,464,728	100.00%	N/A
Democratic hold				

==== By county ====
County	Jacky Rosen Democratic		Sam Brown Republican		Various candidates Other parties		Margin		Total votes cast
County	#	%	#	%	#	%	#	%	Total votes cast
Carson City	13,454	43.68%	15,389	49.97%	1,956	6.35%	−1,935	−6.28%	30,799
Churchill	3,278	24.45%	9,179	68.47%	949	7.08%	−5,901	−44.02%	13,406
Clark	514,662	50.71%	441,057	43.46%	59,118	5.83%	73,605	7.25%	1,014,837
Douglas	11,675	33.12%	22,125	62.76%	1,455	4.13%	−10,450	−29.64%	35,255
Elko	4,439	19.96%	15,850	71.25%	1,956	8.79%	−11,411	−51.30%	22,245
Esmeralda	72	15.72%	345	75.33%	41	8.95%	−273	−59.61%	458
Eureka	107	10.49%	825	80.88%	88	8.63%	−718	−70.39%	1,020
Humboldt	1,838	23.07%	5,500	69.03%	630	7.91%	−3,662	−45.96%	7,968
Lander	538	19.85%	1,924	70.97%	249	9.18%	−1,386	−51.13%	2,711
Lincoln	353	14.38%	1,959	79.83%	142	5.79%	−1,606	−65.44%	2,454
Lyon	9,182	27.58%	21,892	65.77%	2,213	6.65%	−12,710	−38.18%	33,287
Mineral	737	32.23%	1,326	57.98%	224	9.79%	−589	−25.75%	2,287
Nye	7,645	28.48%	17,220	64.15%	1,978	7.37%	−9,575	−35.67%	26,843
Pershing	519	22.65%	1,618	70.62%	154	6.72%	−1,099	−47.97%	2,291
Storey	919	30.05%	1,964	64.22%	175	5.72%	−1,045	−34.17%	3,058
Washoe	130,841	50.04%	115,713	44.25%	14,921	5.71%	15,128	5.79%	261,475
White Pine	846	19.52%	3,160	72.91%	328	7.57%	−2,314	−53.39%	4,334
Totals	701,105	47.87%	677,046	46.22%	86,577	5.91%	24,059	1.64%	1,464,728

==== By congressional district ====
Rosen won three of four congressional districts.

District	Rosen	Brown	Representative
1st	50%	43%	Dina Titus
2nd	43%	51%	Mark Amodei
3rd	49%	45%	Susie Lee
4th	50%	43%	Steven Horsford

== See also ==
- 2024 Nevada elections

== Notes ==
Partisan clients
