= 2026 Nevada Secretary of State election =

- November 3, 2026
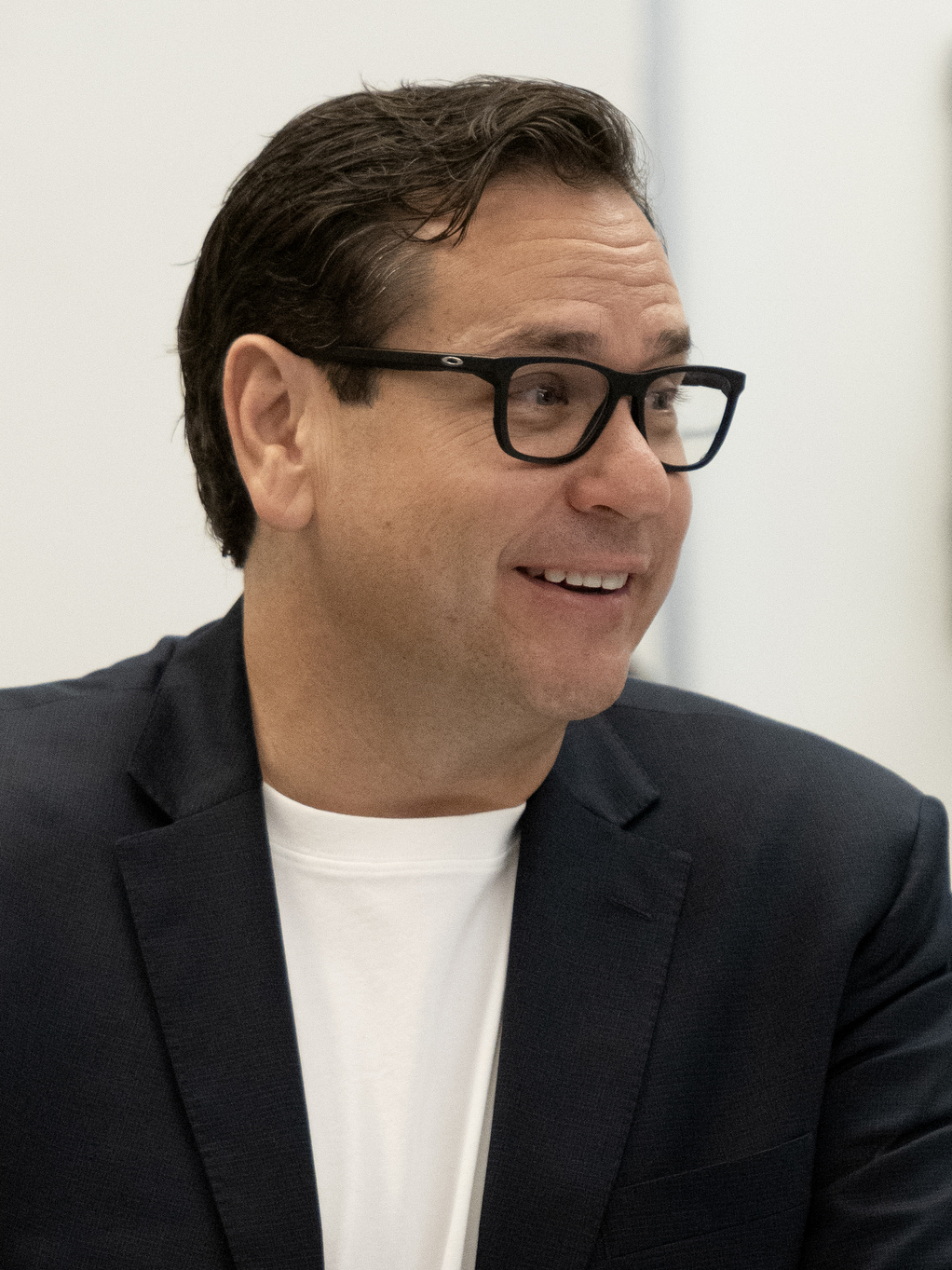

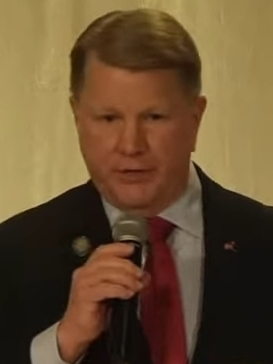
Candidate	Cisco Aguilar	Jim Marchant
Party	Democratic	Republican
Popular vote	616,096	424,242
Percentage	57.0%	39.3%
Secretary of State before election
Cisco Aguilar
Democratic
Elected Secretary of State
Cisco Aguilar
Democratic

The 2026 Nevada Secretary of State election was held on November 3, 2026, to elect the Secretary of State of Nevada. Primary elections were held on June 9. Incumbent Democratic secretary of state Cisco Aguilar won reelection to a second term. He defeated Republican Jim Marchant in the general election in a rematch of the 2022 race, where Aguilar narrowly defeated Marchant.

== Democratic primary ==
=== Candidates ===
==== Nominee ====
- Cisco Aguilar, incumbent secretary of state

=== Endorsements ===
Cisco Aguilar

Organizations

- End Citizens United

Labor unions

- Professional Firefighters of Nevada

== Republican primary ==
=== Candidates ===
==== Nominee ====
- Jim Marchant, former state assemblyman from the 37th district (2016–2018), nominee for Secretary of State in 2022, and perennial candidate

==== Eliminated in primary ====
- Sharron Angle, former state assemblymember (1999–2007) and perennial candidate
- Shirley Folkins-Roberts, businesswoman
- Socorro Keenan, candidate for Nevada State Assembly District 16 in 2024

=== Results ===
Primary results by county: Marchant: 30–40%; 40–50%; Folkins-Roberts: 30–40%; 40–50%; Angle: 20–30%; 30–40%; 40–50%

Republican primary results
Party	Candidate	Votes	%
Republican	Jim Marchant	58,863	32.6
Republican	Shirley Folkins-Roberts	55,228	30.6
Republican	Sharron Angle	47,392	26.2
None of These Candidates		13,135	7.3
Republican	Socorro Keenan	6,104	3.4
Total votes		180,722	100.0

== Independent and third party candidates ==
=== Candidates ===
==== Declared ====
- John T. Kennedy (Libertarian Party)
- Brad Lee Barnhill (Independent American Party)

== General election ==
=== Predictions ===
Source	Ranking	As of
Sabato's Crystal Ball	Likely D	September 9, 2026

=== Post-primary endorsements ===
Cisco Aguilar (D)

Organizations

- Everytown for Gun Safety

Newspapers

- Las Vegas Review-Journal
- Las Vegas Sun

=== Polling ===
Poll source	Date(s) administered	Sample size (Note: Key: A – all adults RV – registered voters LV – likely voters V – unclear)	Margin of error	Cisco Aguilar (D)	Jim Marchant (R)	Other	Undecided
Noble Predictive Insights	October 26–28, 2026	487 (LV)	± 4.4%	51%	38%	5% (Note: Kennedy (L) with 3%; Barnhill (IA) with 1%; "Another candidate not listed" with 1%)	6%
Noble Predictive Insights	September 22–26, 2026	800 (RV)	± 3.5%	41%	32%	8% (Note: "Another candidate" and "None of these candidates" with 4%)	19%
Noble Predictive Insights	September 22–26, 2026	708 (LV)	± 3.7%	44%	37%	6% (Note: "Another candidate" and "None of these candidates" with 3%)	12%

Hypothetical polling

Aguilar vs. Folkins-Roberts

Poll source	Date(s) administered	Sample size	Margin of error	Cisco Aguilar (D)	Shirley Folkins-Roberts (R)	Undecided
RightCount Nevada (R)	February 23–26, 2026	600 (RV)	± 4.1%	49%	47%	4%

=== Results ===
2026 Nevada Secretary of State election
Party	Candidate	Votes	%	±%
Democratic	Cisco Aguilar (incumbent)			
Republican	Jim Marchant			
Independent American	Brad Lee Barnhill			
Libertarian	John T. Kennedy			
None of These Candidates				
Total votes			100.0	
