= Lisa Sutton Gunderson =

American businesswoman, beauty pageant titleholder, motivational speaker and politician

Lisa Song Sutton
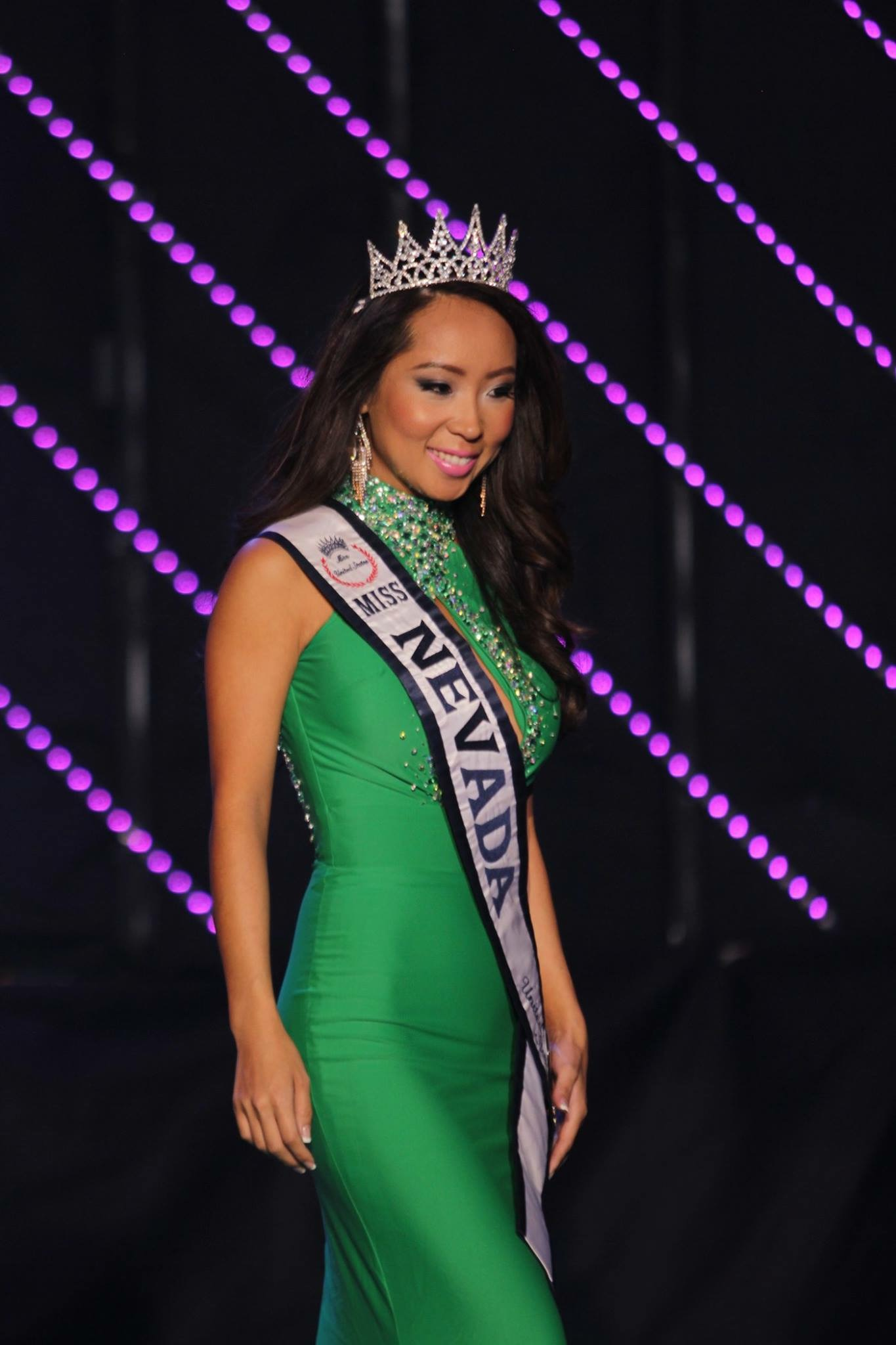
- Sutton in 2014
- Born: Lisa Song Sutton; Seoul, South Korea
- Education: Buena High School; University of Arizona (BS); University of Miami School of Law (JD)
- Occupations: Businessperson and model
- Height: 1.65 m (5 ft 5 in)
- Spouse: Joshua Gunderson (m. 2024)
- Children: 1
- Beauty pageant titleholder
- Major competitions: Miss Las Vegas 2013 (Winner); Miss Nevada United States 2014 (Winner)
- Website: www.lisasongsutton.com

Lisa Song Sutton-Gunderson (née Sutton) is an American businesswoman, real estate investor, motivational speaker, model, beauty pageant titleholder and former political candidate.

== Early and personal life ==
Sutton was born in Seoul to an American father (Vietnam War Air Force veteran) and a South Korean mother. She moved to Arizona, age five. She was involved in multiple extracurricular activities, including tap dancing, piano and flute lessons, ballet and gymnastics. She attended Buena High School in Sierra Vista, Arizona. She has a political science degree from the University of Arizona, and a Juris Doctor degree from the University of Miami School of Law.

Sutton was in a relationship with MMA fighter Cory Hendricks in 2018. She is Catholic. In October 2024, Sutton married former fighter pilot Joshua ‘Cabo’ Gunderson in a civil ceremony. In November 2024, she announced that she was expecting her first child.

== Career ==
In 2005, she was a congressional intern for John McCain, handling calls and office visits. Shortly after graduation, Sutton moved to Las Vegas but never worked as an attorney due to never taking the bar. She was a human resources rep at Atkinson & Associates P.C., and then as vice president of business development for SSK Holdings, Inc, a company she owned with her mother.

In 2012, Sutton together with a modeling friend from Miami, started her first business called Sin City Cupcakes, specializing in alcohol-infused cupcakes and desserts. She went on to launch Ship Las Vegas, a shipping company and Liquid & Lace, a swimwear line. She is a licensed real estate agent, working at Elite Homes - Christie's International Real Estate, which she also co-founded. Her real estate business expanded in February 2022, following the purchase of Engel and Volkers, and is now called Elite Homes - Engel & Volkers. Sutton is a general partner of The Veteran Fund.

== Modeling and pageantry ==
At age 19, Sutton began modeling part-time while in law school. She has been featured in multiple publications, including Sports Illustrated, GQ, Maxim, and Macy's swimwear advertisements.

In 2013, she was crowned Miss Las Vegas, and Miss Nevada United States in 2014.

== Politics ==
Sutton was a Republican candidate for the United States House of Representatives in the 2020 election for Nevada's 4th congressional district. She finished third in the primaries behind Sam Peters and Jim Marchant.
