= Glenn E. Trowbridge =

American politician (born 1943)

Glenn Trowbridge

Member of the Nevada Assembly from the 37th district
- In office December 16, 2014 – November 9, 2016
- Preceded by: Wesley Duncan
- Succeeded by: Jim Marchant

Personal details
- Born: Glenn Earl Trowbridge; September 22, 1943 (age 83) Charleston, West Virginia, U.S.
- Party: Republican
- Spouse: Patricia Lynn Hill
- Children: 1
- Education: San Diego State University; National University
- Occupation: Politician

Glenn Earl Trowbridge (born September 22, 1943) is an American politician. He served as a Republican member of the Nevada Assembly from 2014 until 2016.

== Early life ==
Trowbridge was born on September 22, 1943, in Charleston, West Virginia.

Trowbridge graduated from San Diego State University, where he received a bachelor of science in psychology. He received a master in business administration from the National University.

== Career ==
Between 1979 and 2001, Trowbridge was director of human resources for Clark County, Nevada, followed by director of its parks and recreation department. He later worked for Safe Nest, a non-profit organization which helps victims of domestic violence.

Trowbridge served as a Republican member of the Nevada Assembly. He was appointed to this position due to the vacancy left by Wesley Duncan. He is a member of the National Rifle Association (NRA).

== Electoral history ==
Trowbridge ran for office at least two times before his appointment to the Assembly. He was the Republican nominee for Assembly seat 20 back in 1982. He lost to Democratic incumbent Robert G. Craddock by a margin of 54-43%. He also ran for Las Vegas City Council in 2009, narrowly losing to Stavros Anthony 50.08-49.92%. In the June 16 primary, Trowbridge lost to businessman Jim Marchant by a margin of 62.5-37.5%. His loss attributed to his support of a state commerce tax that was proposed and signed into law by Nevada Governor Brian Sandoval.

== Personal life ==
Trowbridge married Patricia Lynn Hill. They have a son, Thomas. They reside in Las Vegas, Nevada.
