= 2022 New Mexico Secretary of State election =

- November 8, 2022
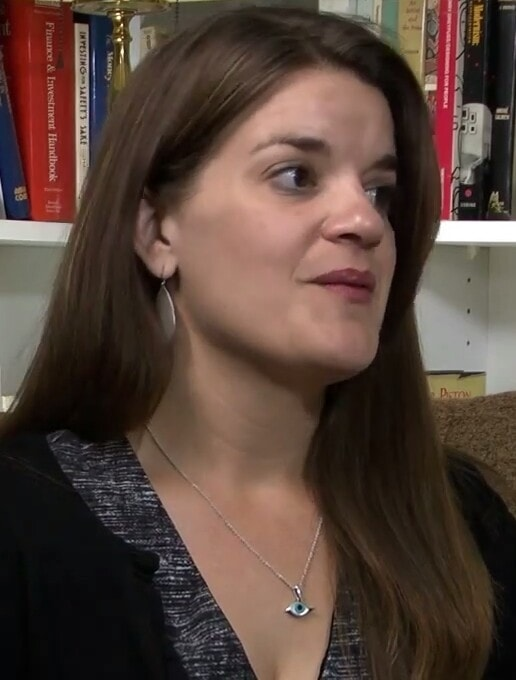

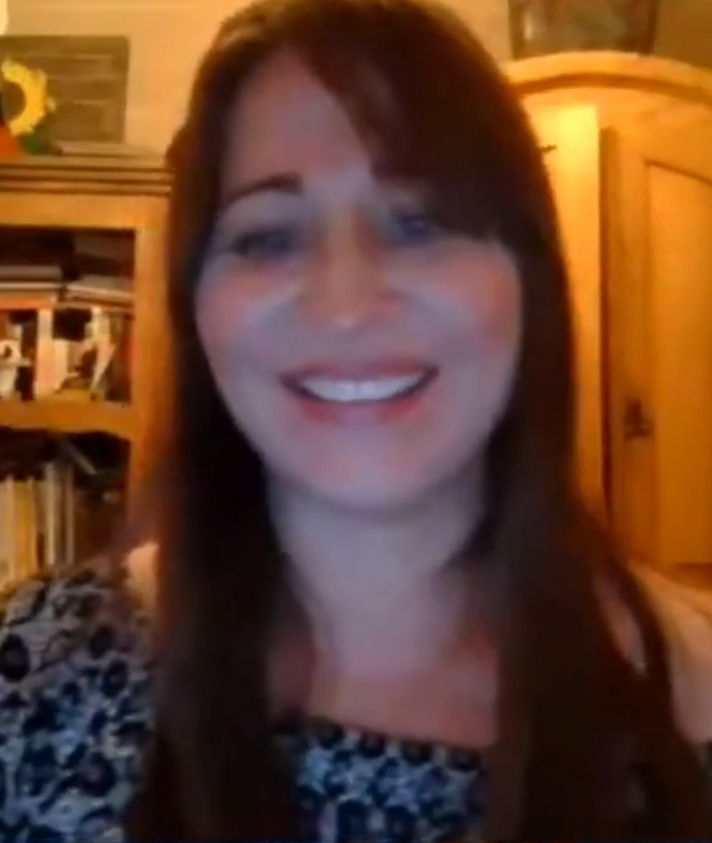
Nominee	Maggie Toulouse Oliver	Audrey Trujillo
Party	Democratic	Republican
Popular vote	384,526	300,763
Percentage	54.52%	42.64%
- Oliver: 40–50% 50–60% 60–70% 70–80% 80–90% >90% Trujillo: 40–50% 50–60% 60–70% 70–80% 80–90% >90% Tie: 40-50% No votes
Secretary of State before election
Maggie Toulouse Oliver
Democratic
Elected Secretary of State
Maggie Toulouse Oliver
Democratic

The 2022 New Mexico Secretary of State election was held on November 8, 2022, to elect the Secretary of State of New Mexico. Incumbent Democratic secretary Maggie Toulouse Oliver won re-election to a second term. She was elected to a full term with 57.8% of the vote in 2018.

== Democratic primary ==
=== Candidates ===
==== Declared ====
- Maggie Toulouse Oliver, incumbent secretary of state

=== Results ===
Democratic primary results
Party	Candidate	Votes	%
Democratic	Maggie Toulouse Oliver (incumbent)	120,492	100.0%
Total votes		120,492	100.0%

== Republican primary ==
Audrey Trujillo, a small business owner, was the sole Republican candidate to file. Her candidacy was endorsed by the America First Secretary of State Coalition. Trujillo called for a statewide audit of the 2020 presidential election.

=== Candidates ===
==== Declared ====
- Audrey Trujillo, small business owner and candidate for New Mexico House of Representatives in 2020

==== Did not file ====
- Tracy Tatro Trujillo, rancher

=== Results ===
Republican primary results
Party	Candidate	Votes	%
Republican	Audrey Trujillo	93,172	100.0%
Total votes		93,172	100.0%

== Libertarian primary ==
=== Candidates ===
==== Declared ====
- Mayna Erika Myers

=== Results ===
Libertarian primary results
Party	Candidate	Votes	%
Libertarian	Mayna Erika Myers	1,142	100.0%
Total votes		1,142	100.0%

== General election ==
=== Predictions ===
Source	Ranking	As of
Sabato's Crystal Ball	Leans D	November 3, 2022
Elections Daily	Likely D	November 7, 2022

=== Polling ===
Poll source	Date(s) administered	Sample size (Note: Key: A – all adults RV – registered voters LV – likely voters V – unclear)	Margin of error	Maggie Toulouse Oliver (D)	Audrey Trujillo (R)	Mayna Myers (L)	Other	Undecided
Research & Polling Inc.	October 20–27, 2022	625 (LV)	± 3.9%	50%	35%	4%	1% (Note: "None of these/Wouldn't say" with 1%)	9%
SurveyUSA	October 21–26, 2022	650 (LV)	± 4.9%	43%	36%	3%	–	17%
SurveyUSA	October 1–6, 2022	570 (LV)	± 5.8%	47%	32%	3%	–	18%
SurveyUSA	September 8–12, 2022	558 (LV)	± 5.7%	46%	35%	3%	–	16%
Research & Polling Inc.	August 19–25, 2022	518 (LV)	± 4.3%	45%	33%	4%	3% (Note: "None of these/Wouldn't say" with 3%)	16%
Public Policy Polling (D)	June 13–14, 2022	642 (V)	± 3.9%	41%	34%	9%	–	16%

=== Results ===
2022 New Mexico Secretary of State election
Party	Candidate	Votes	%	±%
Democratic	Maggie Toulouse Oliver (incumbent)	384,526	54.52%	−3.24%
Republican	Audrey Trujillo	300,763	42.64%	+5.40%
Libertarian	Mayna Myers	20,050	2.84%	−2.16%
Total votes		705,339	100.0%	
Democratic hold				

==== By county ====
County	Maggie Toulouse Oliver Democratic		Audrey Trujillo Republican		Mayna Myers Libertarian		Margin		Total
County	#	%	#	%	#	%	#	%	Total
Bernalillo	150,362	61.88%	86,625	35.65%	5,991	2.47%	63,737	26.23%	242,978
Catron	494	24.70%	1,431	71.55%	75	3.75%	-937	-46.85%	2,000
Chaves	4,414	27.21%	11,350	69.96%	460	2.84%	-6,936	-42.75%	16,224
Cibola	3,610	53.53%	2,881	42.72%	253	3.75%	729	10.81%	6,744
Colfax	2,248	46.23%	2,467	50.73%	148	3.04%	-219	-4.50%	4,863
Curry	2,513	24.72%	7,238	71.21%	414	4.07%	-4,725	-46.48%	10,165
De Baca	215	29.25%	497	67.62%	23	3.13%	-282	-38.37%	735
Doña Ana	31,044	54.10%	24,414	42.55%	1,924	3.35%	6,630	11.55%	57,382
Eddy	3,825	23.08%	12,336	74.43%	414	2.50%	-8,511	-51.35%	16,575
Grant	6,380	55.11%	4,879	42.15%	317	2.74%	1,501	12.97%	11,576
Guadalupe	982	58.24%	659	39.09%	45	2.67%	323	19.16%	1,686
Harding	149	36.61%	247	60.69%	11	2.70%	-98	-24.08%	407
Hidalgo	679	43.83%	822	53.07%	48	3.10%	-143	-9.23%	1,549
Lea	2,355	16.96%	11,139	80.20%	395	2.84%	-8,784	-63.24%	13,889
Lincoln	2,537	30.61%	5,480	66.13%	270	3.26%	-2,943	-35.51%	8,287
Los Alamos	6,306	62.37%	3,375	33.92%	370	3.72%	2,831	28.45%	9,951
Luna	2,575	44.43%	2,986	51.53%	234	4.04%	-411	-7.09%	5,795
McKinley	12,165	64.15%	5,738	30.26%	1,059	5.58%	6,427	33.89%	18,962
Mora	1,488	63.00%	813	34.42%	61	2.58%	675	28.58%	2,362
Otero	6,268	35.83%	10,626	60.74%	600	3.43%	-4,358	-24.91%	17,494
Quay	870	29.07%	2,036	68.03%	87	2.91%	-1,166	-38.96%	2,993
Rio Arriba	8,309	65.41%	4,128	32.50%	266	2.09%	4,181	32.91%	12,703
Roosevelt	1,105	23.88%	3,331	71.97%	192	4.15%	-2,226	-48.10%	4,628
San Juan	13,396	33.81%	24,501	61.84%	1,720	4.34%	-11,105	-28.03%	39,617
San Miguel	6,549	70.12%	2,603	27.87%	188	2.01%	3,946	42.25%	9,340
Sandoval	32,253	53.08%	26,898	44.27%	1,614	2.66%	5,355	8.81%	60,765
Santa Fe	52,966	76.52%	14,958	21.61%	1,295	1.87%	38,008	54.91%	69,219
Sierra	1,973	40.34%	2,773	56.70%	145	2.96%	-800	-16.36%	4,891
Socorro	2,978	49.63%	2,828	47.13%	195	3.25%	150	2.50%	6,001
Taos	10,146	76.64%	2,791	21.08%	302	2.28%	7,355	55.56%	13,239
Torrance	1,847	33.60%	3,469	63.11%	181	3.29%	-1,622	-29.51%	5,497
Union	341	23.32%	1,067	72.98%	54	3.69%	-726	-49.66%	1,462
Valencia	11,184	44.28%	13,377	52.96%	699	2.77%	-2,193	-8.68%	25,260
Totals	384,526	54.52%	300,763	42.64%	20,050	2.84%	83,763	11.88%	705,339

Counties that flipped from Democratic to Republican

- Colfax (largest municipality: Raton)
- Hidalgo (largest municipality: Lordsburg)
- Luna (largest municipality: Deming)
- Valencia (largest municipality: Los Lunas)

==== By congressional district ====
Toulouse Oliver won all three congressional districts.

District	Toulouse Oliver	Trujillo	Representative
1st	57%	41%	Melanie Stansbury
2nd	50%	47%	Yvette Herrell (117th Congress)
2nd	50%	47%	Gabe Vasquez (118th Congress)
3rd	55%	42%	Teresa Leger Fernandez
