= 2022 Nevada Secretary of State election =

- November 8, 2022
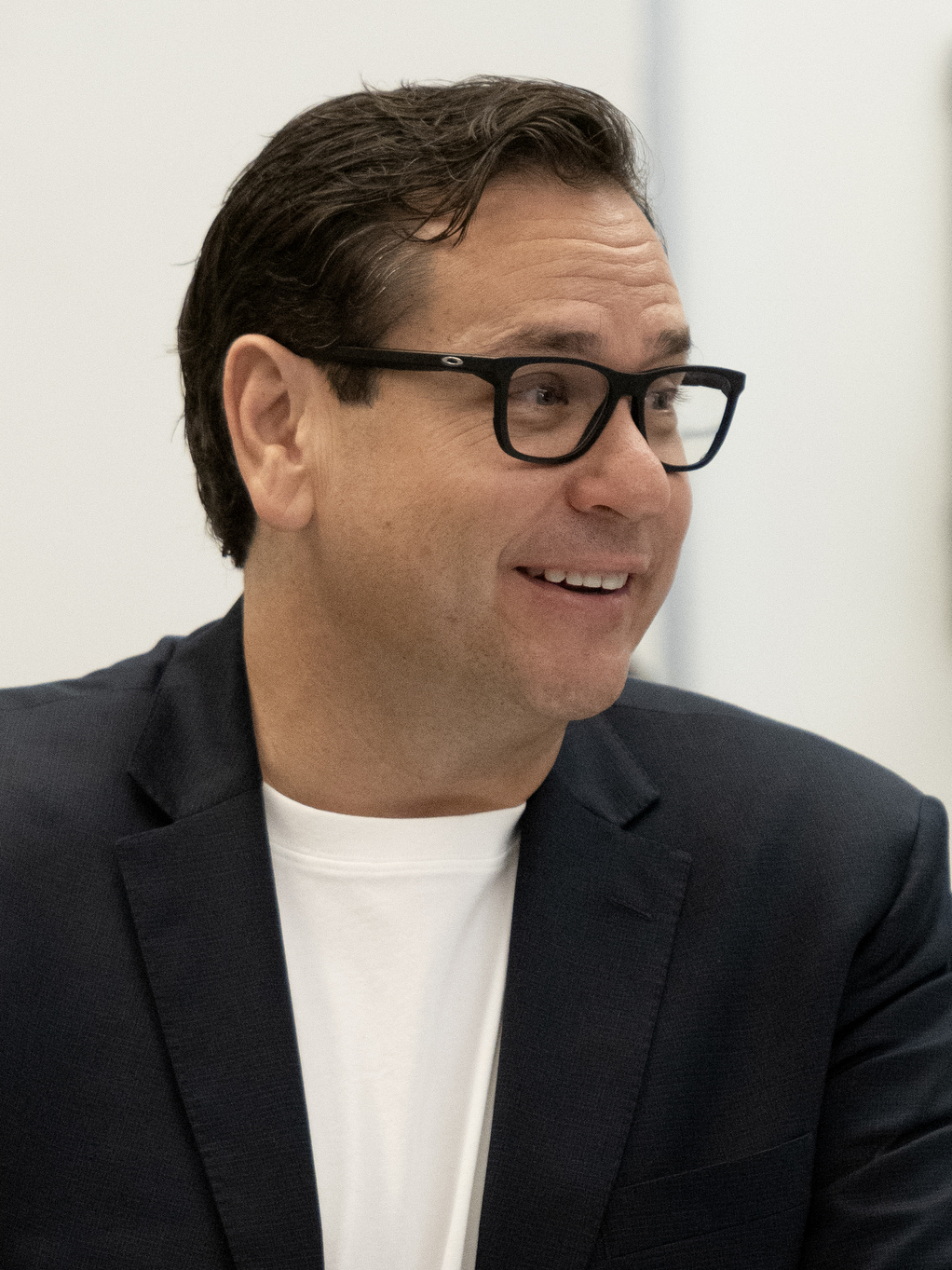

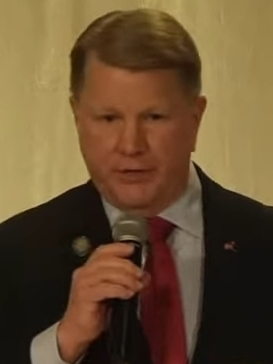
Nominee	Cisco Aguilar	Jim Marchant
Party	Democratic	Republican
Popular vote	496,569	473,467
Percentage	48.95%	46.67%
- Aguilar: 40–50% 50–60% 60–70% 70–80% 80–90% >90% Marchant: 40–50% 50–60% 60–70% 70–80% 80–90% >90% Tie: 40–50% 50% No votes
Secretary ofstate before election
Barbara Cegavske
Republican
Elected Secretary ofstate
Cisco Aguilar
Democratic

The 2022 Nevada Secretary of State election was held on November 8, 2022, to elect the secretary of state of Nevada. Democratic former congressional staffer Cisco Aguilar won the election, defeating Republican former state assemblymember Jim Marchant. Aguillar succeeded Republican incumbent Barbara Cegavske, who was term-limited and ineligible to seek a third term.

== Republican primary ==
=== Candidates ===
==== Nominee ====
- Jim Marchant, former member of the Nevada Assembly for the 37th district (2016–2018) and nominee for Nevada's 4th congressional district in 2020

==== Eliminated in primary ====
- Kristopher Dahir, Sparks city councilman
- John Gerhardt
- Jesse Haw, former state senator (2016)
- Socorro Keenan
- Gerard Ramalho, former news anchor
- Richard Scotti, former 8th Nevada judicial court judge

=== Endorsements ===
Kristopher Dahir

Newspapers

- Las Vegas Sun
Jim Marchant

U.S. Representatives

- Andy Biggs, U.S. Representative from Arizona's 5th congressional district (2017–present)
- Paul Gosar, U.S. Representative from Arizona's 4th congressional district (2013–2023)
- Mark Meadows, U.S. Representative from North Carolina's 11th congressional district (2013–2020) and White House Chief of Staff (2020–2021)

Statewide officials

- Adam Laxalt, Nevada Attorney General (2015–2019) and candidate for 2022 United States Senate election in Nevada.

Organizations

- America First Secretary of State Coalition

=== Polling ===
Poll source	Date(s) administered	Sample size (Note: Key: A – all adults RV – registered voters LV – likely voters V – unclear)	Margin of error	Kristopher Dahir	John Gerhardt	Jesse Haw	Socorro Keenan	Jim Marchant	Gerard Ramalho	Richard Scotti	None of These Candidates	Undecided
OH Predictive Insights	June 6–7, 2022	525 (LV)	± 4.4%	3%	2%	21%	1%	21%	4%	8%	4%	42%
OH Predictive Insights	May 10–12, 2022	500 (LV)	± 4.4%	2%	2%	7%	1%	16%	3%	8%	26%	35%

=== Results ===
GOP primary first round results by county Marchant: 20–30%; 30–40%; 40–50%; 50–60%; Haw: 20–30%; 30–40%

Republican primary results
Party	Candidate	Votes	%
Republican	Jim Marchant	82,843	37.62%
Republican	Jesse Haw	44,778	20.33%
Republican	Richard Scotti	34,984	15.89%
None of These Candidates		18,245	8.28%
Republican	Kristopher Dahir	15,204	6.90%
Republican	John Gerhardt	10,815	4.91%
Republican	Gerard Ramalho	9,325	4.23%
Republican	Socorro Keenan	4,025	1.83%
Total votes		220,219	100.0%

== Democratic primary ==
=== Candidates ===
==== Nominee ====
- Cisco Aguilar, counsel for De Castroverde Law Group; former staffer for then–U.S. Senator Harry Reid

==== Withdrew ====
- Ellen Spiegel, former state assemblywoman from the 20th district (2012–2020) (ran for state controller)

=== Endorsements ===
Cisco Aguilar

Organizations

- Democratic Association of Secretaries of State
- End Citizens United

Labor unions

- Nevada AFL–CIO
- United Auto Workers

== Independents and third-party candidates ==
=== Candidates ===
==== Declared ====
- Ross Crane (Libertarian), sales manager
- Janine Hansen (Independent American), executive director of the Independent American Party of Nevada and perennial candidate

== General election ==
=== Predictions ===
Source	Ranking	As of
Elections Daily	Lean D (flip)	November 8, 2022
Sabato's Crystal Ball	Tossup	November 3, 2022

=== Post-primary endorsements ===
Jim Marchant (R)

Executive branch officials

- Donald Trump, former president of the United States (2017–2021)
Cisco Aguilar (D)

Executive branch officials

- Barack Obama, former president of the United States (2009–2017)

U.S. representatives

- Adam Kinzinger, IL-16 (2011–2023) (Republican)

Individuals

- Lin-Manuel Miranda, songwriter and actor

Newspapers

- Las Vegas Review-Journal

Organizations

- Let America Vote

=== Polling ===
Poll source	Date(s) administered	Sample size	Margin of error	Jim Marchant (R)	Cisco Aguilar (D)	None of These Candidates	Other	Undecided
Emerson College	October 26–29, 2022	2,000 (LV)	± 2.1%	43%	41%	–	–	8%
OH Predictive Insights	October 24–27, 2022	600 (LV)	± 4.0%	38%	41%	1%	6% (Note: Hansen (IA) with 4%; Crane (L) with 2%)	13%
Siena Research/NYT	October 19–24, 2022	885 (LV)	± 4.2%	41%	44%	–	<1% (Note: Crane (L) with <1%; Hansen (IA) with <1%)	15%
University of Nevada, Reno	October 5–19, 2022	584 (LV)	± 4.0%	27%	29%	–	5% (Note: "Some other candidate" with 5%)	40%
CNN/SSRS	September 26 – October 2, 2022	926 (RV)	± 4.7%	44%	44%	6%	4% (Note: "Other" with 4%)	2%
CNN/SSRS	September 26 – October 2, 2022	828 (LV)	± 5.0%	46%	43%	5%	4%	2%
OH Predictive Insights	September 20–29, 2022	741 (LV)	± 3.6%	39%	31%	3%	6% (Note: Hansen with 4%; Crane with 2%)	21%
Suffolk University	August 14–17, 2022	500 (LV)	± 4.4%	31%	27%	7%	9% (Note: Hansen (IA) with 7%; Crane (L) with 2%)	26%

== Results ==
2022 Nevada Secretary of State election
Party	Candidate	Votes	%	±%
Democratic	Cisco Aguilar	496,569	48.95%	+0.70%
Republican	Jim Marchant	473,467	46.67%	−2.24%
None of These Candidates		18,144	1.79%	-1.05%
Independent American	Janine Hansen	17,472	1.72%	N/A
Libertarian	Ross Crane	8,821	0.87%	N/A
Total votes		1,014,473	100.00%	N/A
Democratic gain from Republican				

=== By county ===
County	Jim Marchant Republican		Cisco Aguilar Democratic		Various candidates Other parties		Margin		Total votes cast
County	#	%	#	%	#	%	#	%	Total votes cast
Carson City	11,778	50.13%	10,451	44.49%	1,264	5.38%	−1,327	−5.65%	23,493
Churchill	6,721	68.39%	2,518	25.62%	589	5.99%	−4,203	−42.77%	9,828
Clark	295,920	43.64%	355,074	52.37%	27,068	3.99%	59,154	8.72%	678,062
Douglas	18,171	63.02%	9,480	32.88%	1,183	4.10%	−8,691	−30.14%	28,834
Elko	11,721	72.71%	3,111	19.30%	1,288	7.99%	−8,610	−53.41%	16,120
Esmeralda	335	74.28%	72	15.96%	44	9.76%	−263	−58.31%	451
Eureka	646	82.82%	65	8.33%	69	8.85%	−581	−74.49%	780
Humboldt	4,229	69.43%	1,388	22.79%	474	7.78%	−2,841	−46.64%	6,091
Lander	1,566	70.99%	410	18.59%	230	10.43%	−1,156	−52.40%	2,206
Lincoln	1,690	78.50%	297	13.79%	166	7.71%	−1,393	−64.70%	2,153
Lyon	15,732	67.06%	6,400	27.28%	1,327	5.66%	−9,332	−39.78%	23,459
Mineral	1,085	57.56%	649	34.43%	151	8.01%	−436	−23.13%	1,885
Nye	13,654	65.79%	5,894	28.40%	1,207	5.82%	−7,760	−37.39%	20,755
Pershing	1,194	67.34%	435	24.53%	144	8.12%	−759	−42.81%	1,773
Storey	1,687	66.11%	718	28.13%	147	5.76%	−969	−37.97%	2,552
Washoe	84,810	44.03%	98,961	51.38%	8,833	4.59%	14,151	7.35%	192,604
White Pine	2,528	73.77%	646	18.85%	253	7.38%	−1,882	−54.92%	3,427
Totals	473,467	46.67%	496,569	48.95%	44,437	4.38%	23,102	2.28%	1,014,473

Counties that flipped from Republican to Democratic

- Washoe (largest municipality: Reno)

=== By congressional district ===
District	Marchant	Aguilar	Representative
1st	43.8%	52.0%	Dina Titus
2nd	51.7%	43.3%	Mark Amodei
3rd	44.7%	51.7%	Susie Lee
4th	44.9%	50.7%	Steven Horsford

== Exit poll ==
2022 Nevada Secretary of State election voter demographics (CNN)
Demographic subgroup	Marchant	Aguilar	% of total vote
Ideology
Liberals	95	3	23
Moderates	57	39	42
Conservatives	11	86	35
Party
Democrats	96	2	34
Republicans	6	92	36
Independents	48	45	30
Joe Biden approval rating
Approve	92	5	46
Disapprove	14	83	53
Most important issue to your vote
Inflation	29	67	36
Abortion	90	9	28
Immigration	17	81	12
Crime	46	51	11
Gun policy	N/A	N/A	7
2020 presidential vote
Joe Biden	92	6	45
Donald Trump	7	91	44
Did not vote	N/A	N/A	5
Another candidate	N/A	N/A	3
Gender
Men	44	53	46
Women	53	43	54
Race
White	41	56	67
Latino	62	34	12
Black	81	14	11
Asian	51	42	4
Other	52	37	5
Race by gender
White men	38	60	32
White women	44	53	35
Black men	68	23	4
Black women	89	8	7
Latino men	61	32	6
Latina women	62	36	7
Other	52	40	9
Age
18–29	65	29	11
30–44	58	35	20
45–64	41	56	36
65 or older	44	54	32
Area type
Urban	52	45	73
Suburban	51	45	15
Rural	30	67	12
Education
College graduate	53	43	37
No college degree	47	50	63
Education by race
White college graduates	49	48	26
Whites without college	36	61	41
Non-white college graduates	63	32	10
Non-whites without college	67	27	22
Education by race and gender
White women with college degrees	55	42	12
White women without college degrees	38	59	23
White men with college degrees	44	54	14
White men without college degrees	34	64	18
Voters of color	65	29	33
Educational attainment
Never attended college	47	48	15
Some college	49	47	30
Associate's degree	41	55	18
Bachelor's degree	51	45	22
Advanced degree	56	41	15
