= Shea Backus =

American politician and attorney (born 1975)

Member of the Nevada Assembly from the 37th district
- Incumbent
- Assumed office November 9, 2022
- Preceded by: Andy Matthews
- In office November 7, 2018 – November 4, 2020
- Preceded by: Jim Marchant
- Succeeded by: Andy Matthews

Personal details
- Born: 1975 (age 50–51) Las Vegas, Nevada, U.S.
- Party: Democratic
- Spouse: Marc McDermont
- Education: University of California, San Diego (BS); Arizona State University (JD)
- Website: www.backusfornevada.com

Shea Backus (born 1975) is an American politician and attorney serving as a member of the Nevada Assembly from the 37th district. She is a member of the Cherokee Nation.

== Early life ==
Backus was born in 1975 in Las Vegas, Nevada, a third generation Nevadan. After graduating from Ed W. Clark High School in 1993, Backus earned a B.S. in management science from the University of California, San Diego in 1998 and both a Juris Doctor and Indian Law Certificate from the Sandra Day O'Connor College of Law at Arizona State University in 2003.

== Career ==
Backus has been a member of the State Bar of Nevada since 2003. In 2018, Backus was elected to the Nevada Assembly, representing the 37th district.

== Nevada Assembly ==
She first won Nevada Assembly District in 2018 by a small margin on 135 votes. She later lost the 2020 election for the same seat to Republican Andy Matthews by 657 votes. She ran for and won the same seat in 2022, 2024, and 2026, winning by 806 votes, 1,064 votes, and 4,202 votes respectively. She sits as the chair of the Revenue Commie and vice chair of the Ways and Means committee.

== Policy Positions ==
=== Artificial Intelligence ===
Backus has stated that Nevada has benefited from the construction of data centers, especially when Nevada has faced economic hardship. She claimed she wants to continue monitoring water usage by companies that decide to move to Nevada.

=== Economy ===
Backus has been a proponent of diversifying Nevada's economy away from solely tourism.

=== Education ===
In 2024, Backus has expressed frustration at the Clark County School District because of its budget shortfall despite a 26 percent increase in funding to promote teacher wages, and to help combat large student to teacher ratios; CCSD reporting that it started that school year with a shortage of approximately 1,000 educators.

=== Indigenous Affairs ===
Backus has consistently advocated for an alert system, that informs state police when a report is made for missing and murdered indigenous women, ensuring that restraining orders issued by tribal courts are enforced.

=== Policing ===
Backus has been endorsed by the Las Vegas Protective Association and Nevada Association of Public Safety Officers.

=== Private School Funding ===
Backus has differed from her opposition when it comes to the topic of school choice, saying that term school choice should not apply to public school funding being diverted towards private school, but instead should stay inside the public system, offering charter schools, open enrollment, and career and technical education schools. She has stated she does not want to stop the investment in public schools.

== Personal life ==
Backus is married to Marc McDermont. Her great-grandparents moved to Eureka, Nevada in the early 1900s.

== See also ==
- List of Native American politicians
- Native American women in politics
