= Cisco Aguilar =

American politician

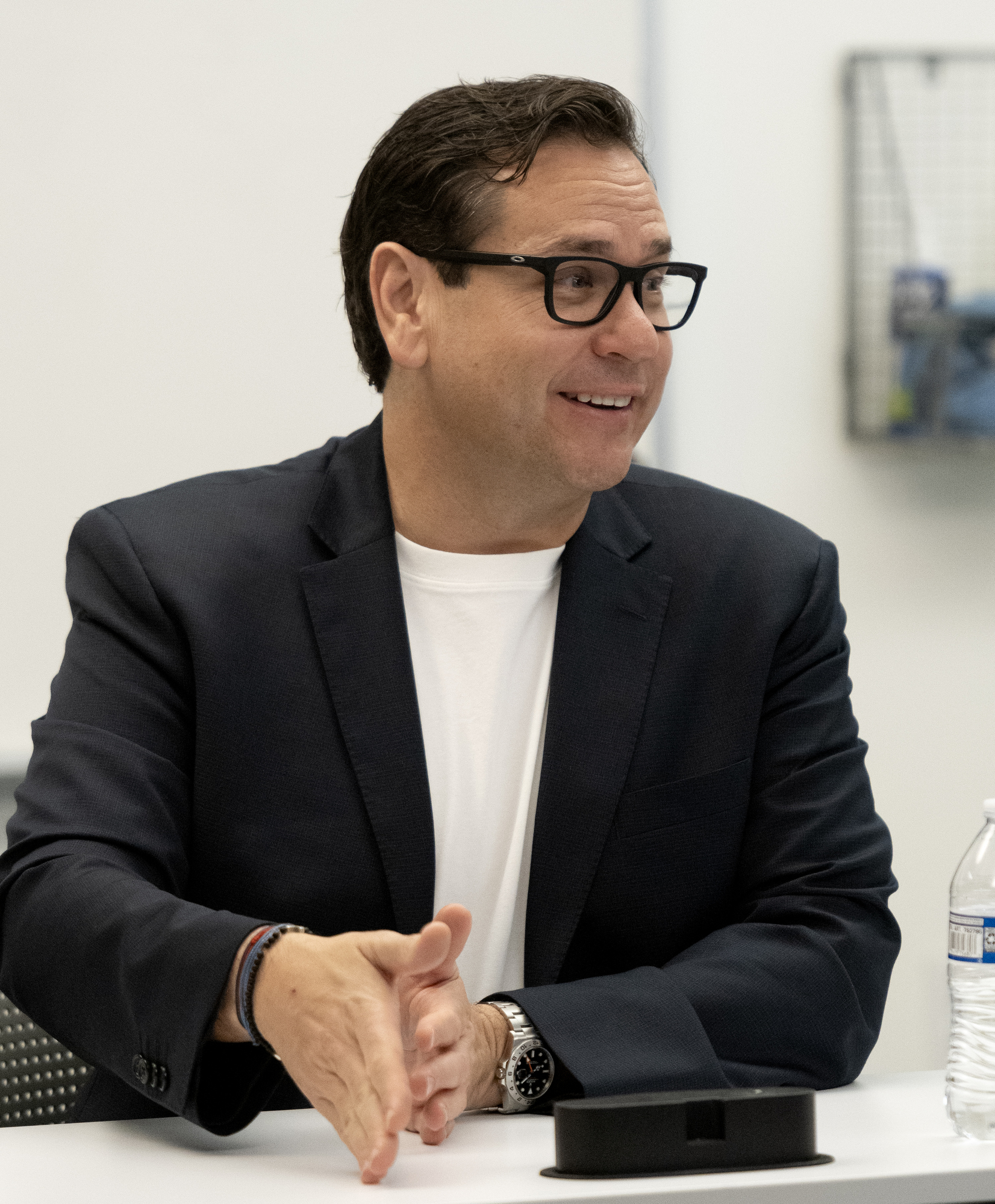
- Aguilar at the LBJ Presidential Library, 2024

18th Secretary of State of Nevada
- Incumbent
- Assumed office January 2, 2023
- Governor: Joe Lombardo
- Preceded by: Barbara Cegavske

Personal details
- Born: Francisco Aguilar; 1976 or 1977 (age 49–50) Tucson, Arizona, U.S.
- Party: Democratic
- Relatives: Adrian Fontes (cousin)
- Education: University of Arizona (BS, MBA, JD)

Francisco V. Aguilar (born 1976/1977) is an American lawyer and politician currently serving as the secretary of state of Nevada since 2023. A member of the Democratic Party, he was elected in 2022, defeating Republican Jim Marchant.

Born and raised in Arizona, Aguilar received both his undergraduate and graduate degrees from the University of Arizona. After moving to Nevada in 2004, Aguilar worked for Nevada Senator Harry Reid, and went on to serve in both private and public roles in law, business, and education until he was elected to state-wide office in 2022.

== Early life and education ==
Aguilar was born in Tucson, Arizona in 1976 or 1977 (age 49–50) to a family of Mexican descent. He is named after his grandfather, Frank Verdugo, a union leader and negotiator at a mine in Hayden, Arizona. He and Adrian Fontes, neighboring secretary of state of Arizona, are distant cousins. Growing up, he participated in several sports, including football, wrestling, and track.

After graduating from University High School in Tucson, he went on to graduate from the University of Arizona with a bachelor's degree in finance and accounting in 2000, and a joint Juris Doctor and Master of Business Administration in 2004.

== Career ==
As a lawyer, he worked as a law clerk for U.S. Senate Majority Leader Harry Reid. Aguilar served for eight years on the Nevada State Athletic Commission, including two years as chairman. He also served as special counsel to James E. Rogers, chancellor of the Nevada System of Higher Education. He also led Agassi Graf, a management company for tennis stars Andre Agassi and Steffi Graf.

Aguilar is a member of the board of directors for NCAA's Las Vegas Bowl, Sletten Construction Company, the Fulfillment Fund Las Vegas and the University of Arizona Foundation Board of Trustees. He is a founding board member of the Innocence Center of Nevada. He was the first chairman of the board of trustees of Cristo Rey St. Viator, a Roman Catholic high school in North Las Vegas that principally serves students from impoverished families.

Before holding office, Aguilar worked for De Castroverde Law Group as an attorney and owns Blueprint Sports, LLC, a sports technology company.

== Nevada Secretary of State ==
Aguilar announced his candidacy to become secretary of state of Nevada for the 2022 election; his predecessor, Barbara Cegavske, a Republican, was ineligible to run again due to strict absolute lifetime term limit laws.

Unopposed in the Democratic Party's primary election, he faced Republican nominee Jim Marchant in the general election. Marchant, a prominent QAnon conspiracy theorist and one-term Nevada assemblyman, lost to Aguilar by a little over 2%. Marchant is also an election denier who believed the 2020 election was stolen from President Donald Trump. Aguilar's victory made him the first Latino Nevada secretary of state.

Aguilar supported a bipartisan bill signed by Republican Governor Joe Lombardo enacted by the Democratic-majority state legislature which makes harassing election workers a felony in Nevada.

In the highly contentious 2020 and 2024 presidential elections, both with narrow margins of victory, has put Nevada's election system in the national spotlight. Aguilar has spent much of his time as secretary of state educating national and local press about Nevada law, which is largely the reason for the delays after election day. Nevada's ballot counting speed has, at least since 2020, become the subject of memes and broader internet culture.

Nevada law requires that all registered voters receive a mail in ballot which they may use in lieu of in person voting. However, mail and ballot signatures must match the signature on file at the Nevada Department of Motor Vehicles. If the signature does not match, voters are given time to complete a process to verify their signature and have their vote counted. Letters are also given a period of time to correct their signature, which must be verified by election workers. In the 2024 election, approximately 14,000 ballots had errors that needed to be corrected with November 12 being the latest deadline.

== Electoral history ==
2022 Nevada Secretary of State election
Party	Candidate	Votes	%
Democratic	Cisco Aguilar	496,569	48.95
Republican	Jim Marchant	473,467	46.67
None of These Candidates		18,144	1.79
Independent American	Janine Hansen	17,472	1.72
Libertarian	Ross Crane	8,821	0.87
Total votes		1,014,473	100.0
Democratic gain from Republican			

Political offices
Preceded by Barbara Cegavske	Secretary of State of Nevada; 2023–present	Incumbent
