= Lia Roberts =

Romanian-American politician (born 1949)

Leader of the Nevada Republican Party

Personal details
- Born: Lia Sandu; May 7, 1949 (age 77) Bucharest, Romania
- Party: Republican
- Occupation: Politician
- Known for: Expressed intention to run in the Romanian election of 2004

Lia Roberts (born Lia Sandu on May 7, 1949) is a Romanian and American politician. The former leader of the Nevada Republican Party, she expressed an intention to run in the Romanian election of 2004, but withdrew due to poor poll numbers.

Born in Bucharest, she emigrated from Communist Romania in 1979, later becoming a naturalized American citizen. She lives in Las Vegas, where she serves as honorary consul for the Romanian Consulate.
