= America First Secretary of State Coalition =

2022 American right-wing political coalition

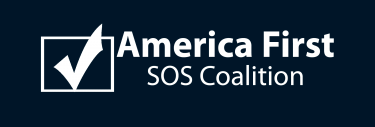
- Abbreviation: America First SOS Coalition
- Purpose: Supporting candidates in the 2022 United States secretary of state elections
- Headquarters: Las Vegas, Nevada
- President: Jim Marchant

The America First Secretary of State Coalition ("America First SOS Coalition") was an American right-wing coalition formed to support a slate of candidates in the 2022 United States secretary of state elections who supported former president Donald Trump's fabricated claims that the 2020 election was stolen. The coalition's president was Jim Marchant, the unsuccessful Republican nominee for Secretary of State of Nevada, and was headquartered in Las Vegas.

The coalition endorsed 14 candidates for state secretary of state, as well as Pennsylvania gubernatorial candidate Doug Mastriano, Arizona gubernatorial candidate Kari Lake, and Ohio congressional candidate Dante Sabatucci. The coalition was financially supported by the affiliated Conservatives for Election Integrity PAC (CFEI PAC). Out of the 17 total candidates the coalition endorsed, only 7 candidates advanced past the Republican Party primaries, and just one candidate, Diego Morales, was elected in the 2022 elections. Morales would go on to lose his re-election campaign, serving only one term.

== History and foundation ==
The existence of the coalition was first disclosed by Marchant during a conversation on Steve Bannon's podcast, War Room. Marchant had been described as the leading organizer of the coalition.

The coalition reportedly formed following a meeting in May 2021 involving Marchant, QAnon conspiracy theorist Wayne Willott, and other conservative activists and fundraisers. Mike Lindell, founder and CEO of My Pillow, Inc., was reportedly a backer of the coalition.

Initial candidates supported by the coalition included Mark Finchem (Arizona), Kristina Karamo (Michigan), and Jody Hice (Georgia), each of whom had been endorsed by former President Donald Trump. As of February 2022, Marchant was working to recruit candidates running for secretary of state in both Wisconsin and Minnesota.

=== Conservatives for Election Integrity PAC (CFEI PAC) ===
An affiliated political action committee (PAC), the Conservatives for Election Integrity PAC (CFEI PAC), was founded by Marchant with the goal of fundraising for candidates for secretary of state. According to the Brennan Center, the PAC has raised $110,000 as of May 2022. The America Project, founded by former Overstock.com CEO Patrick M. Byrne, was a prominent contributor to the PAC.

== Policy goals and support ==
According to The New York Times, the coalition supported eliminating alleged voter fraud through "eliminating mail-in ballots, requiring single-day voting and committing to 'aggressive voter roll cleanup,' measures that critics had suggested would suppress thousands of Democratic votes."

== Candidates ==
The following is a list of candidates from the America First SOS website. The only candidate who won a general election was Secretary of State of Indiana Diego Morales.

Candidate	State	Primary date	Primary result	General result
Audrey Trujillo	New Mexico	June 7, 2022 (Note: Had no primary opposition.)	Nominated	Lost
Doug Mastriano	Pennsylvania (Governor)	May 17, 2022	Nominated	Lost
Kristina Karamo	Michigan	April 9, 2022 (Note: Nominee was chosen at party convention)	Nominated	Lost
Mark Finchem	Arizona	August 3, 2022	Nominated	Lost
Michael Brown	Kansas	August 2, 2022	Lost primary	Lost primary
Tina Peters	Colorado	June 28, 2022	Lost primary	Lost primary
Jim Zeigler	Alabama	June 21, 2022 (Note: Runoff election)	Lost runoff	Lost primary
Diego Morales	Indiana	June 18, 2022 (Note: Nominee was chosen at party convention)	Nominated	Won
Jim Marchant	Nevada	June 14, 2022	Nominated	Lost
Keith Blanford	South Carolina	June 14, 2022	Lost primary	Lost primary
Rachel Hamm	California	June 7, 2022	Lost primary	Lost primary
Jody Hice	(Georgia (U.S. state)) Georgia	May 24, 2022	Lost primary	Lost primary
Dorothy Moon	Idaho	May 17, 2022	Lost primary	Lost primary
Robert Borer	Nebraska	May 10, 2022	Lost primary	Lost primary
Jay Schroeder	Wisconsin	August 9, 2022	Lost primary	Lost primary
Dante Sabatucci	Ohio (13th congressional district)	May 3, 2022	Lost primary	Lost primary
Kari Lake	Arizona (Governor)	August 2, 2022	Nominated	Lost

== See also ==
- 2022 United States secretary of state elections
- America First (policy)
- Attempts to overturn the 2020 United States presidential election
- QAnon
