= Jim Marchant =

American politician (born 1956)

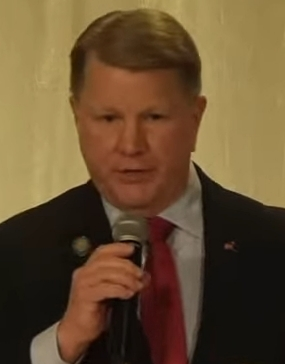
- Marchant in 2022

Member of the Nevada Assembly from the 37th district
- In office November 9, 2016 – November 7, 2018
- Preceded by: Glenn E. Trowbridge
- Succeeded by: Shea Backus

Personal details
- Born: James Carl Marchant Jr. May 28, 1956 (age 70) Gainesville, Florida, U.S.
- Party: Republican
- Education: Troy University (BA)

James Carl Marchant Jr. (born May 28, 1956) is an American politician, currently residing in Nevada. A member of the Republican Party, he represented the 37th district in the Nevada Assembly, covering parts of the northwestern Las Vegas Valley, from 2016 to 2018. A staunch supporter of President Donald Trump, Marchant was the Republican nominee for Nevada's 4th congressional district in 2020 and for Secretary of State of Nevada in 2022.

Marchant's political positions are considered far-right. In 2020, Marchant lost his U.S. House election to Democrat Steven Horsford, while Trump lost his reelection bid in the concurrent presidential race. In the aftermath of the election, Marchant became a staunch proponent of the disproven conspiracy theory that the election was "stolen" from Republicans through mass voter fraud. He sued to have his own defeat overturned, and became actively involved in numerous unsuccessful efforts to send alternate electors to Washington and overturn the presidential election.

Marchant subsequently announced his candidacy for Nevada Secretary of State in 2022. He was endorsed by far-right congressmen Paul Gosar and Andy Biggs of neighboring Arizona, as well as former White House Chief of Staff Mark Meadows. Marchant was the president of the America First Secretary of State Coalition, a group of Republican 2022 Secretary of State candidates supporting the false claim that the 2020 presidential election was stolen. He repeatedly said that he would not have certified President Joe Biden's victory in Nevada if he had been Secretary of State at the time of the election, and that he would consider doing the same in 2024 if Biden carried the state again. He also tied himself closely to QAnon, a disproven far-right conspiracy theory, attending an October 2021 conference associated with the movement in Las Vegas. Marchant lost the 2022 election to Democrat Cisco Aguilar.

Marchant was a candidate for the United States Senate in the 2024 election in Nevada, a seat held by incumbent Democrat Jacky Rosen. He lost in the primary to Sam Brown, placing third. He is currently a candidate for Nevada Secretary of State in 2026.

== Early life and education ==
Marchant was born on May 28, 1956, in Gainesville, Florida. He graduated from Troy University with a degree in criminal justice, and moved to Nevada from Florida in 2005. Marchant worked for the family business from 1978 until 1984, when he left to found his own business.

== Political career ==
=== Nevada State Assembly ===
In 2015, Marchant threatened to run against then-Speaker John Hambrick; he ultimately decided to challenge Glenn E. Trowbridge instead. Marchant defeated Trowbridge and then Democrat Sean D. Lyttle in the general election. In 2018, Marchant was unopposed in the Republican primary, but narrowly lost his re-election campaign for Assembly District 37 to Shea Backus, a Democrat, 50.3% to 49.7%.

=== 2020 congressional race ===
Marchant ran for the U.S. House to represent Nevada's 4th congressional district in 2020. He won the Republican Primary with 34.8% of the vote, but lost the general election against incumbent Democrat Steven Horsford by a margin of 50.7% to 45.8%. After losing the election, he sued to have the result reversed, alleging voter fraud claims. Marchant's request was denied by a Clark County District Court judge on November 20, 2020. On his Nevada Secretary of State campaign website, Marchant claims he "was a victim of election fraud".

=== 2022 Nevada Secretary of State election ===
Jim Marchant was a candidate for Secretary of State of Nevada in the 2022 election. Marchant had denied Biden's victory in the state in 2020, claiming that "It's almost statistically impossible that Joe Biden won."

In the aftermath of the 2020 United States presidential election, Marchant supported the Trump fake electors plot, the attempt by former President Donald Trump and his allies to overturn the election result by sending fake electors from Nevada to vote for Trump in the Electoral College instead of the Democratic electors chosen by Nevada voters. He said that if he is elected Secretary of State, he would also support the sending of alternate electors from Nevada after the 2024 presidential election.

Marchant also stated that he would eliminate vote by mail, end early voting, and remove all electronic voting machines, which would be replaced by hand counting in a "traceable paper-ballot only" voting system. He has advocated for decentralizing vote counting, and has actively sought to convince counties to eliminate the use of voting machines and to conduct all ballot counting by hand, which experts say will increase human error in the ballot counting process and make counting slower.

Marchant's promise to end voting by mail is based on the theory that voting by mail caused widespread voter fraud in the 2020 United States presidential election. Moreover, Marchant's desire to replace voting machines with hand counts has its root in another theory that Dominion Voting Systems machines, in collaboration with deceased Venezuelan leader Hugo Chavez and billionaire philanthropist George Soros, switched votes from former President Donald Trump to President Joe Biden. Marchant claims he only wishes to ban voting machines until they can be inspected for fraud. Republican Nevada Secretary of State Barbara Cegavske's office reviewed voting machines and found it was "certain" that voting machines were not compromised.

Marchant also wanted to eliminate the use of the Electronic Registration Information Center (ERIC), a nonprofit bipartisan organization which shares voter registration information between 33 member states in order to prevent individuals from registering to vote in multiple states. After the 2020 United States presidential election, ERIC came under attack from conspiracy theorists who claimed without evidence that it was part of a left-wing conspiracy orchestrated by George Soros.

Some of Marchant's other policy proposals as they relate to elections were requiring government issued voter identification to vote, banning ballot drop boxes, and a nationwide audit of the 2020 United States presidential election. An investigation by the Associated Press of potential voter fraud in six states disputed by former President Donald Trump and his legal team—Arizona, Georgia, Michigan, Nevada, Pennsylvania, and Wisconsin—found 475 potential voter fraud cases out of President Joe Biden's combined 311,257 vote victory margin in those six states.

Marchant also backed a proposal that would require everyone in Nevada to re-register to vote, citing fears of ineligible voters registered to vote. Some voting rights advocates claim the proposal is an act of voter suppression since Southern segregationists in the Jim Crow South required people to re-register to vote in order to deny the vote to black Americans.

As they relate to business, some of Jim Marchant's proposals included lowering or eliminating Nevada's business licensing fees, which currently sit at $500 for corporations and $200 for other businesses; implementing a "business filing fee holiday" until, in Marchant's words, "we get out of this malaise that we're having right now"; simplifying the process for starting a business; and decreasing regulations on businesses, citing actions by former President Donald Trump as examples. Finally, Marchant proposes a ban on "underage transgender treatment in Nevada" and identifies as anti-abortion and pro-life.

Marchant won the Republican primary, receiving 37.6% of the vote, while Jesse Haw finished in second place with 20.3%. He lost to Democrat Cisco Aguilar in the general election.

=== QAnon connections ===
Jim Marchant has often been linked to QAnon, a fringe conspiracy theory that began on the far-right of the internet that claims that a cabal of Satanic child sex traffickers are conspiring against President Donald Trump.

According to the Daily Dot, Marchant follows several QAnon influencers on Gab and Telegram. On Gab, one account that Marchant follows is a pro-Nazi QAnon influencer called IPOT1776, who has argued that Jewish people were spreading Communism and "degeneracy" and that the Nazis were a natural reaction to the "Judeo-Bolshevik menace". It is not known if Marchant followed this account before it began publishing openly antisemitic content. IPOT1776 has also made consistent references to Q, a figure at the center of the QAnon conspiracy theory. Marchant's account also follows QAnon influencers Ron Watkins and Neon Revolt. On Telegram, Marchant follows a man called "QAnon John" and also follows a chat for fans of QAnon influencer Ron Watkins.

According to the Daily Dot, Marchant uses the username @jcm9079 on Gab. The username jcm9079 has also been used on Disqus and RedState, where the user claimed they met Newt Gingrich in Las Vegas. In a thread on "The Diesel Stop", a post by an account with the username jcm9079 was signed "Jim" and in the thread it was revealed that the user jcm9079 lived in Las Vegas, Nevada. The username jcm9079 is used in Jim Marchant's personal emails, his Instagram account, and his Rumble account. Marchant's Telegram account is registered with Marchant's publicly available phone number. His username is @JimMarchant and his bio reads "Running for Nevada Secretary of State." Marchant denies that both the Gab account with the username @jcm9079 and his Telegram are his.

On October 25, 2021, Marchant attended and spoke at "For God & Country: Patriot Double Down", a QAnon event in Las Vegas. Also in attendance were Arizona Secretary of State candidate Mark Finchem, California Secretary of State candidate Rachel Hamm, and Michigan Secretary of State candidate Kristina Karamo.

Marchant told attendees that on November 4, 2020, the day after he lost his bid for Nevada's 4th congressional district, he was in his hotel room when he heard a knock at his door. It was Juan O. Savin, a QAnon influencer who some adherents to the QAnon conspiracy theory believe is John F. Kennedy Jr. in disguise. Savin, whose real name is Wayne Willott, then convinced Marchant, who originally planned to run for the U.S. House of Representatives, to run for Nevada Secretary of State.

During their meeting, they discussed forming a coalition to win Secretary of State positions nationwide. Said Marchant, "I knew right then that they had figured out that we need to take back the secretary of state offices around the country. Not only did they ask me to run, they asked me to put together a coalition of other like-minded secretary of state candidates. I got to work, Juan O Savin helped, and we formed a coalition."

In May 2021, Marchant and Savin convened a meeting with conservative media figures, activists, and donors to strategize winning Secretary of State elections nationwide. According to Marchant, some of the approximately 40 participants in the Las Vegas meeting included Patrick Byrne, founder of Overstock.com; Mike Lindell, CEO of MyPillow; Brian E. Kennedy, former Claremont Institute president; and Joe Hoft, brother of Jim Hoft, the owner of The Gateway Pundit.

The result of the meeting was the formation of the America First Secretary of State Coalition, a group of 17 individuals running for Secretary of State positions in 17 states. Jim Marchant is President of the America First Secretary of State Coalition. All the coalition's members believe the baseless conspiracy theory that the 2020 United States presidential election was stolen from former President Donald Trump by voter fraud. No widespread voter fraud for the 2020 election has been proven.

Lastly, Marchant has made frequent references to a "globalist", "socialist", and "communist" "cabal" that controls the world. The term "cabal" is highly associated with the QAnon conspiracy theory.

According to Marchant, Republican politicians have been "bought off and they get co-opted by the cabal, the socialist communist cabal." He also claims the cabal has rigged every election in Nevada since 2008 beginning with President Barack Obama, who Marchant believes was "installed by the communist socialist cabal". He claims, "in Nevada, we haven't elected anybody since 2006." Furthermore, Marchant believes the "cabal" stole the 2020 Presidential election with Dominion Voting Systems machines: "the cabal, the deep state cabal, basically invented the Dominion machines to cheat and they tested it in Venezuela first." This is a reference to an unfounded conspiracy theory that before his death in 2013, Venezuelan leader Hugo Chavez manipulated Dominion Voting Systems machines, which were planted by billionaire philanthropist George Soros to switch votes from former President Donald Trump to President Joe Biden. He also claims the "cabal" purposefully used COVID-19 to destroy the country and that President Joe Biden is a puppet of the World Economic Forum, which Marchant calls "elitist globalists that control everything".

In 2024, Marchant expressed an antisemitic conspiracy theory, claiming that a secret cabal “had a plan for thousands of years, actually… they’re evil people. You know, they’ve taken control of everything through the money system." Marchant said that this group "started with the Khazarians," referencing a fringe theory that the Khazars were the ancestors of modern Ashkenazi Jews. Marchant further stated that this cabal was responsible for the assassinations of Abraham Lincoln and John F. Kennedy.

=== 2024 Senate bid ===
Marchant ran for a seat in the United States Senate In 2024. He lost the Republican primary to Sam Brown.

== Electoral history ==
Nevada Assembly District 37 Republican primary, 2016
Party	Candidate	Votes	%
Republican	Jim Marchant	2,511	62.5%
Republican	Glenn E. Trowbridge (incumbent)	1,506	37.5%
Total votes		4,017	100.0%

Nevada Assembly District 37 election, 2016
Party	Candidate	Votes	%
Republican	Jim Marchant	16,085	52.5%
Democratic	Sean D. Lyttle	14,561	47.5%
Total votes		30,646	100.0%

Nevada Assembly District 37 election, 2018
Party	Candidate	Votes	%
Democratic	Shea Backus	14,222	50.2%
Republican	Jim Marchant (incumbent)	14,087	49.7%
Total votes		28,309	100.0%

Nevada's 4th Congressional District election, 2020
Party	Candidate	Votes	%
Democratic	Steven Horsford (incumbent)	168,457	50.7
Republican	Jim Marchant	152,284	45.8
Libertarian	Jonathan Royce Esteban	7,978	2.4
Independent American	Barry Rubinson	3,750	1.1
Total votes		332,469	100.0
Democratic hold			

Nevada Secretary of State Republican primary, 2022
Party	Candidate	Votes	%
Republican	Jim Marchant	82,843	37.62
Republican	Jesse Haw	44,778	20.33
Republican	Richard Scotti	34,984	15.89
Republican	Kristopher Dahir	15,204	6.90
Republican	John Cardiff Gerhardt	10,815	4.91
Republican	Gerard Ramalho	9,325	4.23
Republican	Socorro Keenan	4,025	1.83
	Other	18,245	8.28
Total votes		220,219	100.0

2022 Nevada Secretary of State election
Party	Candidate	Votes	%
Democratic	Cisco Aguilar	496,569	48.95
Republican	Jim Marchant	473,467	46.67
None of These Candidates		18,144	1.79
Independent American	Janine Hansen	17,472	1.72
Libertarian	Ross Crane	8,821	0.87
Total votes		1,014,473	100.0
Democratic gain from Republican			

2024 United States Senate election in Nevada, Republican primary results
Party	Candidate	Votes	%
Republican	Sam Brown	103,102	60.2%
Republican	Jeffrey Ross Gunter	24,987	14.6%
Republican	Jim Marchant	11,190	6.5%
Republican	Tony Grady Jr.	9,565	5.6%
Republican	None of These Candidates	7,164	4.2%
Republican	William Conrad	6,038	3.5%
Republican	Stephanie Phillips	3,828	2.2%
Republican	Garn Mabey	1,818	1.1%
Republican	Ronda Kennedy	1,786	1.0%
Republican	Barry Lindemann	852	0.5%
Republican	Edward Hamilton	478	0.3%
Republican	Vincent Rego	311	0.2%
Republican	Gary Marinch	231	0.1%
Total votes		171,350	100.0%
