= Jesse Haw =

American politician and businessman

Member of the Nevada Senate from the 15th district
- In office September 27, 2016 – November 9, 2016
- Preceded by: Greg Brower
- Succeeded by: Heidi Gansert

Personal details
- Born: 1971 (age 54–55)
- Party: Republican
- Spouse: Amber
- Children: 2
- Education: University of Nevada, Reno

Jesse Haw (born 1971) is an American politician and businessman from Nevada. A Republican, Haw served in the Nevada Senate in 2016.

Haw's family moved to Nevada when he was five years old. He graduated from Edward C. Reed High School in Sparks, Nevada. Haw enrolled at Arizona State University, and transferred to the University of Nevada, Reno, when his father fell ill and retired from the family business, Hawco Properties.

In 2016, Governor Brian Sandoval called a special session of the Nevada Legislature to debate providing public financing for a stadium in Las Vegas for the Oakland Raiders of the National Football League. The county commission for Washoe County interviewed candidates to fill empty seats in the legislature prior to the session. The commission appointed Haw to the Nevada Senate for District 15. He was succeeded in office by Heidi Gansert.

Haw ran for secretary of state of Nevada in the 2022 elections, seeking to succeed Barbara Cegavske, who was ineligible to run due to term limits. He received 20% of the vote in the primary election, losing the nomination to Jim Marchant, who received 38% of the vote.
