= 2020 United States House of Representatives elections in Nevada =

- November 3, 2020

All 4 Nevada seats to the United States House of Representatives
| | Majority party | Minority party |
|---|---|---|
| Party | Democratic | Republican |
| Last election | 3 | 1 |
| Seats won | 3 | 1 |
| Seat change | Steady | Steady |
| Popular vote | 665,526 | 633,827 |
| Percentage | 49.09% | 46.76% |
| Swing | ▼2.04% | ▲0.99% |

Democratic
40–50%
50–60%
60–70%
Republican
40–50%
50–60%
60–70%
70–80%
80–90%

The 2020 United States House of Representatives elections in Nevada was held on November 3, 2020, to elect the four U.S. representatives from the state of Nevada, one from each of the state's four congressional districts. The elections coincided with the 2020 U.S. presidential election, other elections to the House of Representatives, elections to the Nevada Senate, and various state and local elections.

== Overview ==
| District | Democratic | | Republican | | Others | | Total | | Result |
| District | Votes | % | Votes | % | Votes | % | Votes | % | Result |
|---|---|---|---|---|---|---|---|---|---|
| District 1 | 137,868 | 61.77% | 74,490 | 33.37% | 10,855 | 4.86% | 223,213 | 100.0% | Democratic hold |
| District 2 | 155,780 | 40.71% | 216,078 | 56.46% | 10,815 | 2.83% | 382,673 | 100.0% | Republican hold |
| District 3 | 203,421 | 48.75% | 190,975 | 45.77% | 22,856 | 5.48% | 417,252 | 100.0% | Democratic hold |
| District 4 | 168,457 | 50.67% | 152,284 | 45.80% | 11,728 | 3.53% | 332,469 | 100.0% | Democratic hold |
| Total | 665,526 | 49.09% | 633,827 | 46.76% | 56,254 | 4.15% | 1,355,607 | 100.0% | |

Popular vote
| Democratic | 49.09% |
| Republican | 46.76% |
| Other | 4.15% |

House seats
| Democratic | 75.00% |
| Republican | 25.00% |

== District 1 ==
2020 Nevada's 1st congressional district election
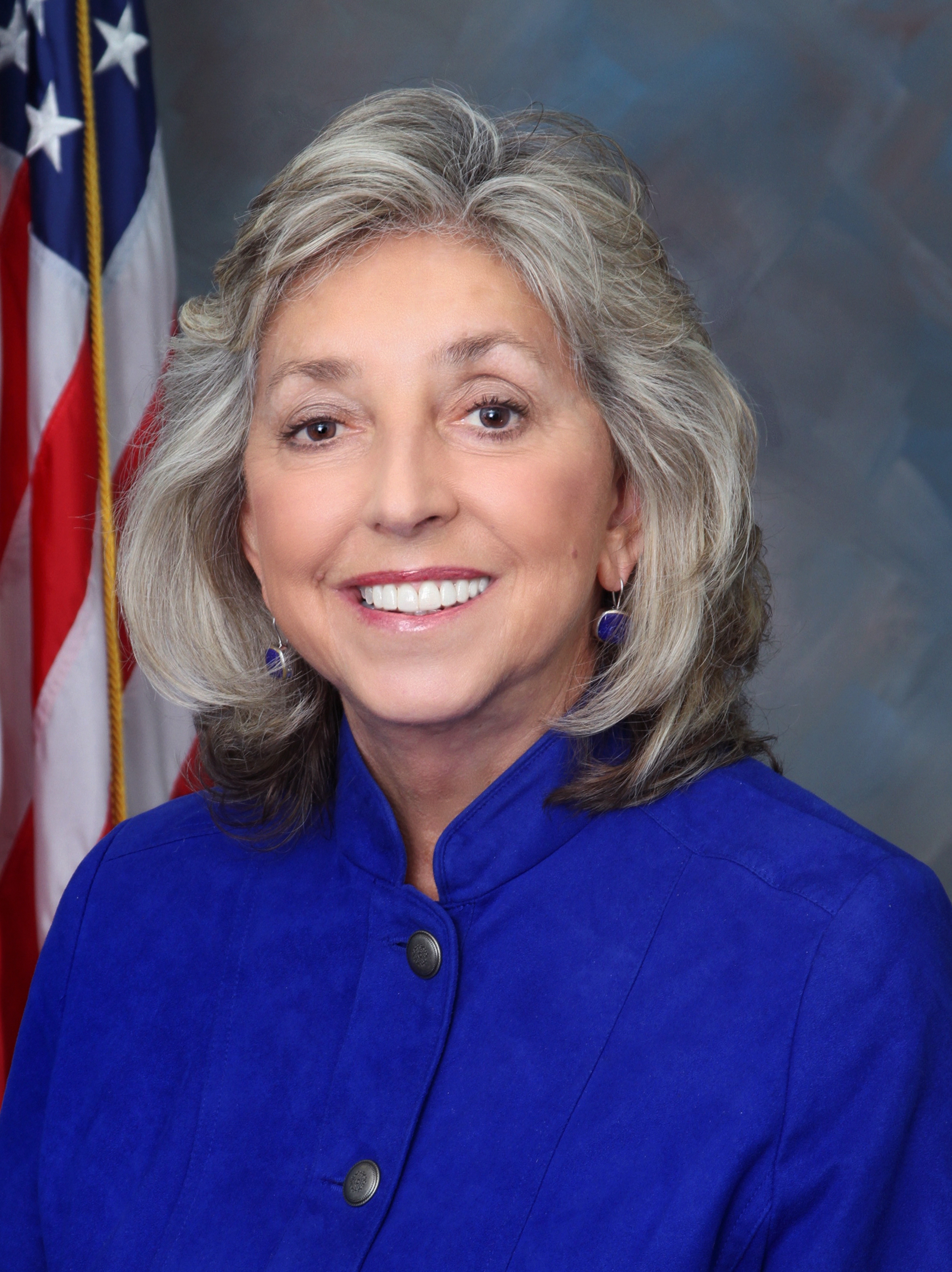

| Nominee | Dina Titus | Joyce Bentley |
| Party | Democratic | Republican |
| Popular vote | 137,868 | 74,490 |
| Percentage | 61.8% | 33.4% |
- Titus: 50–60% 60–70% 70–80% 80–90% >90% Bentley: 50–60% 70–80% No votes
U.S. Representative before election
Dina Titus
Democratic
Elected U.S. Representative
Dina Titus
Democratic

The 1st district encompasses the Las Vegas Strip, taking in Downtown Las Vegas, Winchester, Paradise, Spring Valley, and Whitney. The incumbent was Democrat Dina Titus, who was re-elected with 66.2% of the vote in 2018.

=== Democratic primary ===
==== Candidates ====
===== Declared =====
- Allen Rheinhart, candidate for U.S. Senate in 2016
- Anthony Thomas Jr., security guard
- Dina Titus, incumbent U.S. representative

==== Endorsements ====
Dina Titus

Organizations

- Brady Campaign
- Humane Society of the United States Legislative Fund
- League of Conservation Voters Action Fund
- National Organization for Women
- Planned Parenthood Action Fund
- Population Connection
- Sierra Club
- Silver State Equality

Unions

- National Education Association
- Nevada State AFL–CIO

==== Primary results ====
Democratic primary results
| Party | Candidate | Votes | % |
|---|---|---|---|
| Democratic | Dina Titus (incumbent) | 31,916 | 82.6 |
| Democratic | Anthony Thomas Jr. | 4,324 | 11.2 |
| Democratic | Allen Rheinhart | 2,382 | 6.2 |
| Total votes | | 38,622 | 100.0 |

=== Republican primary ===
==== Candidates ====
===== Declared =====
- Joyce Bentley, realtor and nominee for Nevada's 1st congressional district in 2018
- Josh Elliott, publicist
- Eddie Hamilton, businessman and perennial candidate
- Citlaly Larios-Elias, fashion designer

==== Primary results ====
Republican primary results
| Party | Candidate | Votes | % |
|---|---|---|---|
| Republican | Joyce Bentley | 5,565 | 35.9 |
| Republican | Josh Elliott Jr. | 4,549 | 29.3 |
| Republican | Citlaly Larios-Elias | 3,151 | 19.8 |
| Republican | Eddie Hamilton | 2,347 | 15.0 |
| Total votes | | 15,612 | 100.0 |

=== General election ===
==== Predictions ====
| Source | Ranking | As of |
|---|---|---|
| The Cook Political Report | Safe D | July 2, 2020 |
| Inside Elections | Safe D | June 2, 2020 |
| Sabato's Crystal Ball | Safe D | July 2, 2020 |
| Politico | Safe D | April 19, 2020 |
| Daily Kos | Safe D | June 3, 2020 |
| RCP | Safe D | June 9, 2020 |
| Niskanen | Safe D | June 7, 2020 |

==== Results ====
Nevada's 1st congressional district, 2020
| Party | Candidate | Votes | % |
|---|---|---|---|
| Democratic | Dina Titus (incumbent) | 137,868 | 61.8 |
| Republican | Joyce Bentley | 74,490 | 33.4 |
| Independent American | Kamau Bakari | 6,190 | 2.8 |
| Libertarian | Robert Van Strawder | 4,665 | 2.1 |
| Total votes | | 223,213 | 100.0 |
| Democratic hold | | | |

== District 2 ==
2020 Nevada's 2nd congressional district election
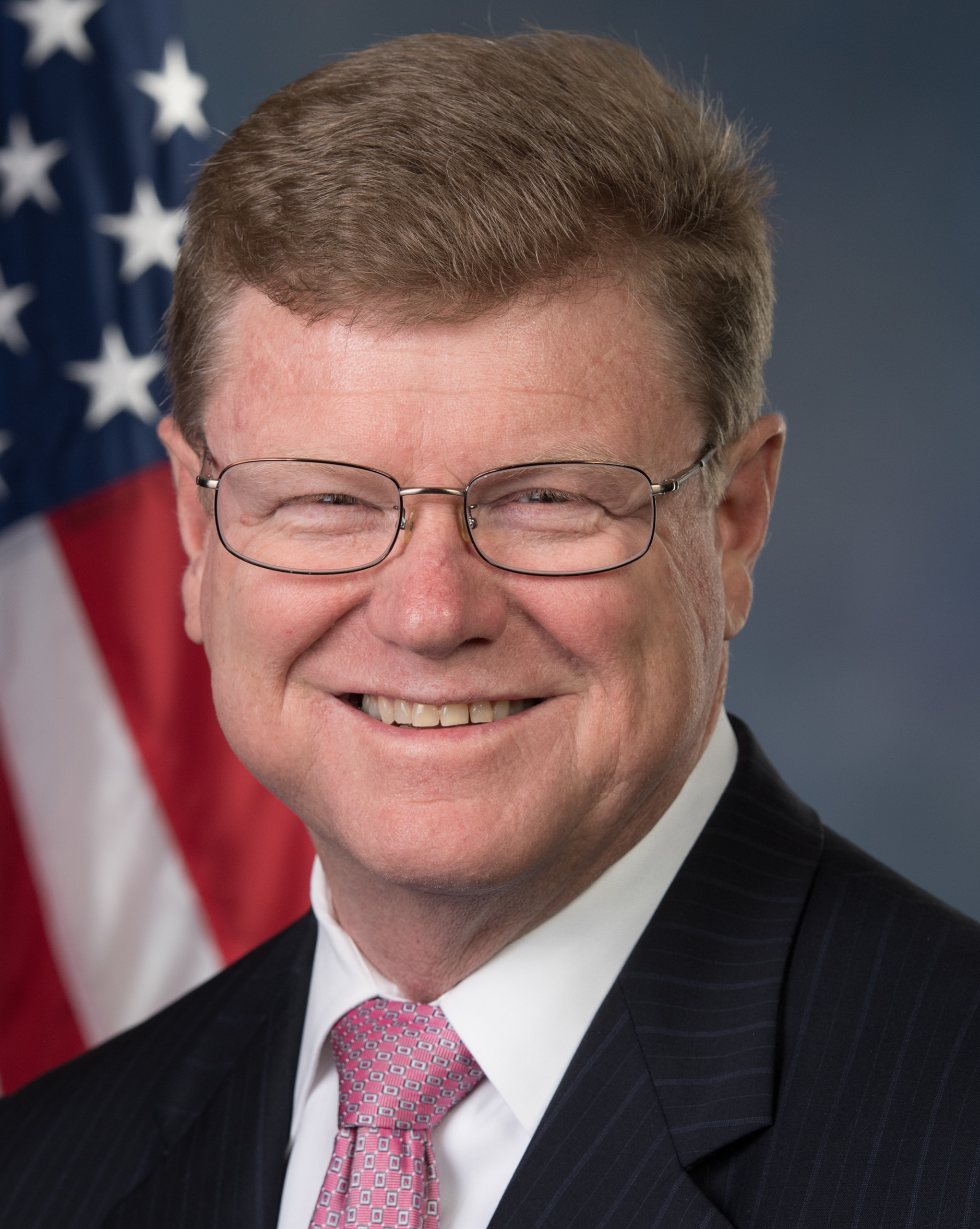

| Nominee | Mark Amodei | Patricia Ackerman |
| Party | Republican | Democratic |
| Popular vote | 216,078 | 155,780 |
| Percentage | 56.5% | 40.7% |
- Amodei: 40–50% 50–60% 60–70% 70–80% 80–90% >90% Ackerman: 40–50% 50–60% 60–70% 70–80% 80–90% Tie: 40–50% 50% No votes
U.S. Representative before election
Mark Amodei
Republican
Elected U.S. Representative
Mark Amodei
Republican

The 2nd district covers much of northern Nevada, including Reno, Sparks and Carson City. The incumbent was Republican Mark Amodei, who was re-elected with 58.2% of the vote in 2018.

=== Republican primary ===
==== Candidates ====
===== Declared =====
- Mark Amodei, incumbent U.S. representative
- Joel Beck, U.S. Air Force veteran and candidate for Nevada's 2nd congressional district in 2018
- Jesse Douglas Hurley, entrepreneur

===== Declined =====
- Heidi Gansert, state senator
- Ben Kieckhefer, state senator
- Adam Laxalt, former Nevada attorney general and candidate for governor of Nevada in 2018
- James Settelmeyer, minority leader of the Nevada Senate
- Danny Tarkanian, attorney, businessman and perennial candidate
- Jim Wheeler, minority leader of the Nevada Assembly
Hypothetical polling

| Poll source | Date(s) administered | Sample size (Note: Key: A – all adults RV – registered voters LV – likely voters V – unclear) | Margin of error | Mark Amodei | Adam Laxalt | Undecided |
|---|---|---|---|---|---|---|
| WPA Intelligence (Note: Club for Growth is a pro-Republican PAC.) | October 15–16, 2019 | 400 (LV) | ± 4.9% | 35% (Note: Standard VI response) | 39% | 27% |
| WPA Intelligence | October 15–16, 2019 | 400 (LV) | ± 4.9% | 26% (Note: Response after pollster addresses respondents with talking points about Mark Amodei's stances on the impeachment of Trump) | 56% | 19% |

==== Primary results ====
Republican primary results
| Party | Candidate | Votes | % |
|---|---|---|---|
| Republican | Mark Amodei (incumbent) | 61,462 | 80.8 |
| Republican | Joel Beck | 11,308 | 14.9 |
| Republican | Jesse Douglas Hurley | 3,307 | 4.3 |
| Total votes | | 76,077 | 100.0 |

=== Democratic primary ===
==== Candidates ====
===== Declared =====
- Patricia Ackerman, candidate for Nevada State Assembly in 2018
- Ed Cohen, communications consultant
- Reynaldo Hernandez, produce clerk
- Clint Koble, nominee for Nevada's 2nd congressional district in 2018
- Ian Luetkehans
- Steve Schiffman, former U.S. diplomat
- Rick Shepherd, progressive activist

==== Endorsements ====
Patricia Ackerman

Organizations

- National Organization for Women
- Sierra Club

==== Primary results ====
Democratic primary results
| Party | Candidate | Votes | % |
|---|---|---|---|
| Democratic | Patricia Ackerman | 26,411 | 48.9 |
| Democratic | Clint Koble | 12,315 | 22.8 |
| Democratic | Ed Cohen | 7,186 | 13.3 |
| Democratic | Rick Shepherd | 3,998 | 7.4 |
| Democratic | Reynaldo Hernandez | 2,790 | 5.2 |
| Democratic | Steve Schiffman | 974 | 1.8 |
| Democratic | Ian Luetkehans | 338 | 0.6 |
| Total votes | | 54,012 | 100.0 |

=== General election ===
==== Predictions ====
| Source | Ranking | As of |
|---|---|---|
| The Cook Political Report | Safe R | July 2, 2020 |
| Inside Elections | Safe R | June 2, 2020 |
| Sabato's Crystal Ball | Safe R | July 2, 2020 |
| Politico | Likely R | April 19, 2020 |
| Daily Kos | Safe R | June 3, 2020 |
| RCP | Safe R | June 9, 2020 |
| Niskanen | Safe R | June 7, 2020 |

==== Results ====
Nevada's 2nd congressional district, 2020
| Party | Candidate | Votes | % |
|---|---|---|---|
| Republican | Mark Amodei (incumbent) | 216,078 | 56.5 |
| Democratic | Patricia Ackerman | 155,780 | 40.7 |
| Independent American | Janine Hansen | 10,815 | 2.8 |
| Total votes | | 382,673 | 100.0 |
| Republican hold | | | |

== District 3 ==
2020 Nevada's 3rd congressional district election
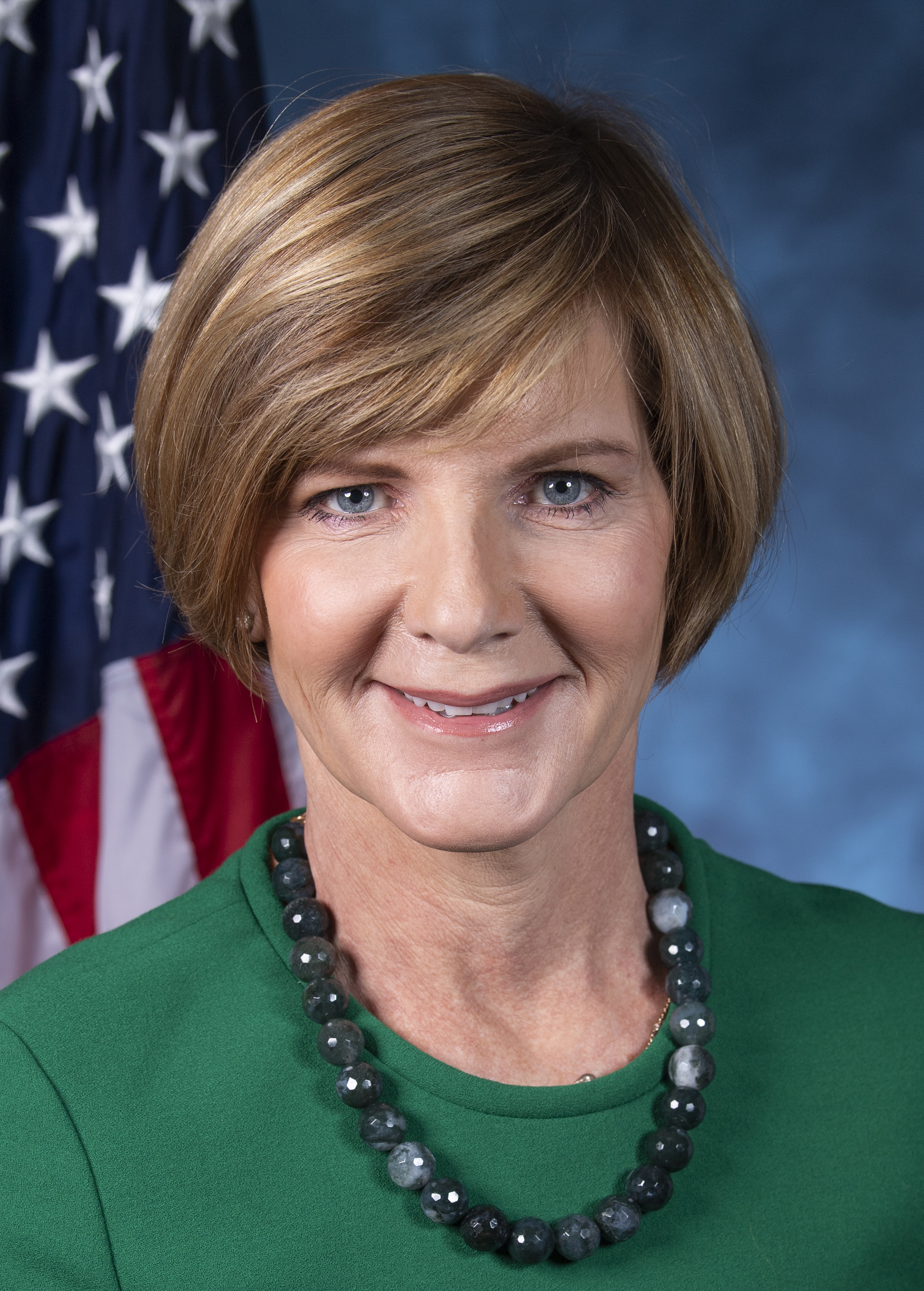

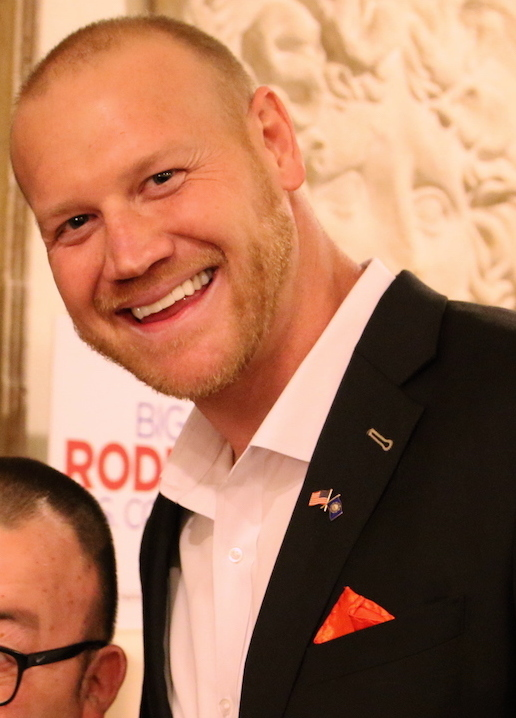
| Nominee | Susie Lee | Daniel Rodimer |
| Party | Democratic | Republican |
| Popular vote | 203,421 | 190,975 |
| Percentage | 48.8% | 45.8% |
- Lee: 40–50% 50–60% 60–70% 70–80% Rodimer: 40–50% 50–60% 60–70% 70–80% No votes
U.S. Representative before election
Susie Lee
Democratic
Elected U.S. Representative
Susie Lee
Democratic

The 3rd district encompasses the southern Las Vegas suburbs including Enterprise, Boulder City, Henderson, and Summerlin South. The incumbent was Democrat Susie Lee, who was elected with 51.9% of the vote in 2018.

=== Democratic primary ===
==== Candidates ====
===== Declared =====
- Susie Lee, incumbent U.S. representative
- Dennis Sullivan, physician
- Tiffany Watson, caregiver

===== Withdrawn =====
- Gary Crispin, marketing consultant

==== Endorsements ====
Susie Lee

Former U.S. executive branch officials

- Barack Obama, former president of the United States (2009–2017), former senator from Illinois (2005–2008)

Federal officials

- Kamala Harris, U.S. senator from California; vice president of the United States

Organizations

- Brady Campaign
- End Citizens United
- Equality PAC
- Humane Society of the United States Legislative Fund
- League of Conservation Voters Action Fund
- NARAL Pro-Choice America
- National Organization for Women
- Planned Parenthood Action Fund
- Population Connection
- Sierra Club
- Silver State Equality

Unions

- National Education Association
- Nevada State AFL–CIO

==== Primary results ====
Democratic primary results
| Party | Candidate | Votes | % |
|---|---|---|---|
| Democratic | Susie Lee (incumbent) | 49,223 | 82.8 |
| Democratic | Dennis Sullivan | 5,830 | 9.8 |
| Democratic | Tiffany Watson | 4,411 | 7.4 |
| Total votes | | 59,464 | 100.0 |

=== Republican primary ===
==== Candidates ====
===== Declared =====
- Brian Nadell, professional poker player
- Cory Newberry, businessman
- Mindy Robinson, actress
- Dan Rodimer, former WWE professional wrestler and candidate for Nevada State Senate in 2018
- Dan Schwartz, former Nevada state treasurer and candidate for governor of Nevada in 2018
- Victor Willert, teacher

==== Endorsements ====
Daniel Rodimer

U.S. politicians

- Kevin McCarthy, House majority leader (2014–2019), House minority leader (2019–present) and U.S. representative (2007–present) for California's 23rd congressional district (2013–present)

State politicians

- Adam Laxalt, Nevada attorney general (2015–2019) and Republican nominee for governor of Nevada in 2018

Organizations

- American Conservative Union
- Gun Owners of America
- National Right to Life
- NRA Political Victory Fund
Dan Schwartz

State politicians

- John Hambrick, Nevada state assemblyman for the 2nd district (2008–present) and speaker of the Nevada Assembly (2015–2017)
- Ron Knecht, Nevada state controller (2015–2019)
- Al Kramer, Nevada state assemblyman for the 40th district (2016–present)
- Sue Lowden, Nevada state senator for the Clark 3 district (1993–1997) and Nevada Republican Party chairwoman (2007–2009)

==== Primary results ====
Republican primary results
| Party | Candidate | Votes | % |
|---|---|---|---|
| Republican | Dan Rodimer | 25,143 | 49.8 |
| Republican | Dan Schwartz | 13,667 | 27.1 |
| Republican | Mindy Robinson | 6,659 | 13.2 |
| Republican | Brian Nadell | 1,971 | 3.9 |
| Republican | Cory Newberry | 1,913 | 3.8 |
| Republican | Victor Willert | 1,116 | 2.2 |
| Total votes | | 50,469 | 100.0 |

=== General election ===
==== Post-primary endorsements ====
Dan Rodimer (R)

U.S. politicians

- Donald Trump, president of the United States
Susie Lee (D)

Organizations

- United States Chamber of Commerce

==== Predictions ====
| Source | Ranking | As of |
|---|---|---|
| The Cook Political Report | Lean D | November 2, 2020 |
| Inside Elections | Likely D | October 28, 2020 |
| Sabato's Crystal Ball | Lean D | November 2, 2020 |
| Politico | Lean D | November 2, 2020 |
| Daily Kos | Safe D | November 1, 2020 |
| RCP | Tossup | November 2, 2020 |
| Niskanen | Safe D | November 1, 2020 |

==== Results ====
Nevada's 3rd congressional district, 2020
| Party | Candidate | Votes | % |
|---|---|---|---|
| Democratic | Susie Lee (incumbent) | 203,421 | 48.8 |
| Republican | Dan Rodimer | 190,975 | 45.8 |
| Libertarian | Steve Brown | 12,315 | 2.9 |
| Independent American | Edward Bridges III | 10,541 | 2.5 |
| Total votes | | 417,252 | 100.0 |
| Democratic hold | | | |

== District 4 ==
2020 Nevada's 4th congressional district election
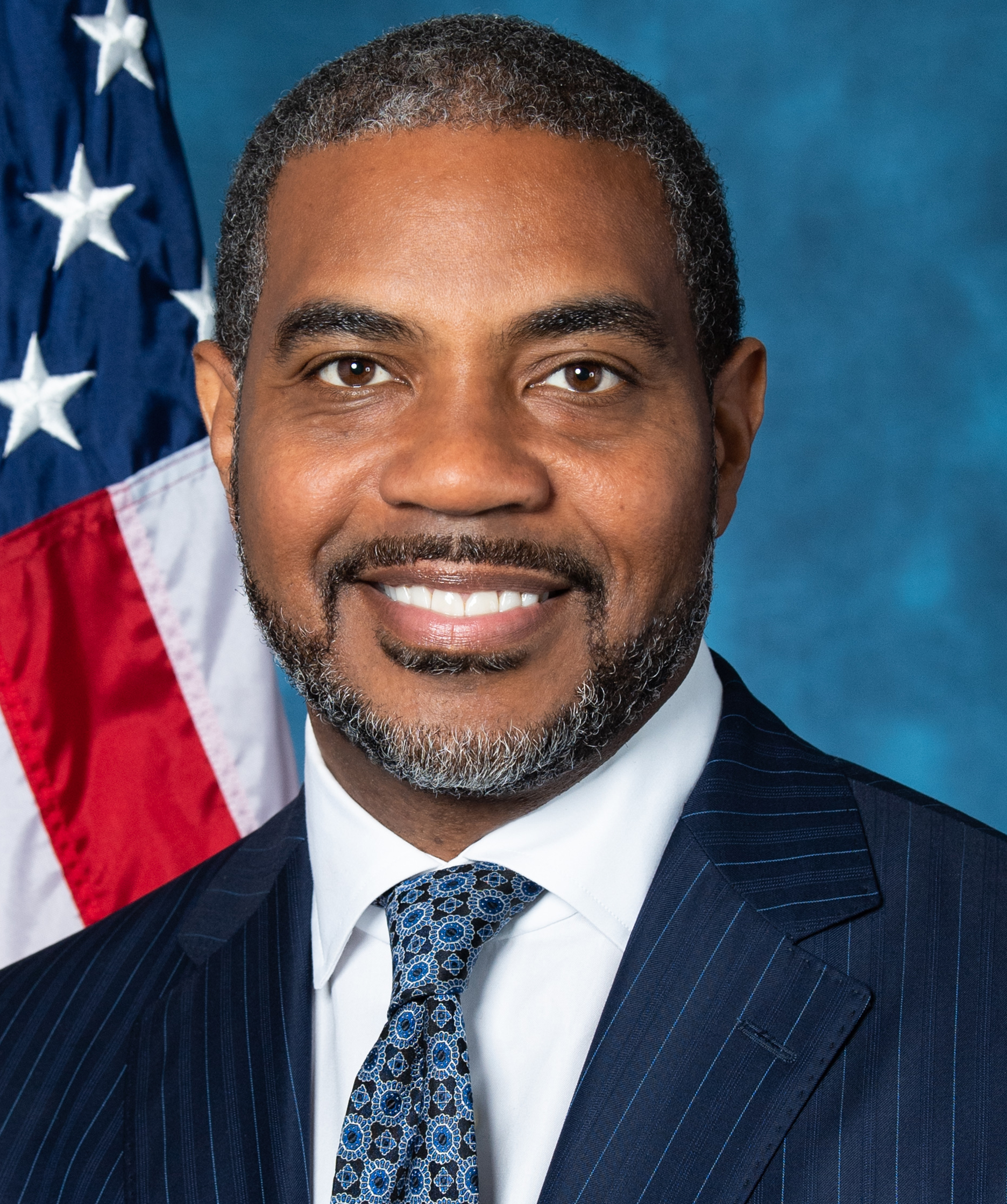

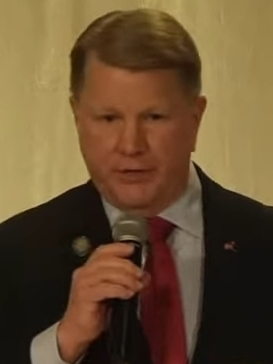
| Nominee | Steven Horsford | Jim Marchant |
| Party | Democratic | Republican |
| Popular vote | 168,457 | 152,284 |
| Percentage | 50.7% | 45.8% |
- Horsford: 40–50% 50–60% 60–70% 70–80% 80–90% >90% Marchant: 40–50% 50–60% 60–70% 70–80% 80–90% >90% Tie: 40–50% 50% No votes
U.S. Representative before election
Steven Horsford
Democratic
Elected U.S. Representative
Steven Horsford
Democratic

The 4th district covers the northern Las Vegas suburbs, including North Las Vegas, and takes in rural central Nevada. The incumbent was Democrat Steven Horsford, who was elected with 51.9% of the vote in 2018.

=== Democratic primary ===
==== Candidates ====
===== Declared =====
- George Brucato, small business owner
- Chris Colley, re-recording mixer
- Gabrielle D'Ayr, risk manager
- Jennifer Eason, progressive activist
- Steven Horsford, incumbent U.S. representative
- Gregory Kempton, teacher

==== Endorsements ====
Steven Horsford

Former U.S. executive branch officials

- Barack Obama, former president of the United States (2009–2017), former senator from Illinois (2005–2008)

Organizations

- Black Economic Alliance
- Brady Campaign
- CHC BOLD PAC
- End Citizens United
- Equality PAC
- Humane Society of the United States Legislative Fund
- NARAL Pro-Choice America
- National Organization for Women
- Planned Parenthood Action Fund
- Population Connection
- Sierra Club
- Silver State Equality

Unions

- National Education Association
- Nevada State AFL–CIO

==== Primary results ====
Democratic primary results
| Party | Candidate | Votes | % |
|---|---|---|---|
| Democratic | Steven Horsford (incumbent) | 39,656 | 75.1 |
| Democratic | Jennifer Eason | 4,968 | 9.4 |
| Democratic | Gabrielle D'Ayr | 3,847 | 7.3 |
| Democratic | Gregory Kempton | 1,507 | 2.8 |
| Democratic | Chris Colley | 1,431 | 2.7 |
| Democratic | George Brucato | 1,424 | 2.7 |
| Total votes | | 52,833 | 100.0 |

=== Republican primary ===
==== Candidates ====
===== Declared =====
- Rosalie Bingham, businesswoman
- Leo Blundo, Nye County commissioner
- Jim Marchant, former state assemblyman
- Charles Navarro, former district director for former U.S. Representative Cresent Hardy and U.S. Navy veteran
- Sam Peters, U.S. Air Force veteran and businessman
- Randi Reed, entrepreneur
- Lisa Song Sutton, businesswoman, attorney, and former Miss Nevada United States
- Rebecca Wood, businesswoman

==== Endorsements ====
Jim Marchant

U.S. politicians

- Andy Biggs, U.S. representative for Arizona's 5th congressional district (2017–present)
- Paul Gosar, U.S. representative (2011–present) for Arizona's 4th congressional district (2013–present)
- Jim Jordan, U.S. representative for Ohio's 4th congressional district (2007–present)

Local politicians

- Mike Montandon, mayor of North Las Vegas (1997–2009) and Republican candidate for governor of Nevada in 2010

Others

- Niger Innis, national spokesperson for CORE and Republican candidate for Nevada's 4th congressional district in 2014
Sam Peters

U.S. politicians

- Newt Gingrich, former speaker of the U.S. House of Representatives (1995–1999)

State politicians

- Robert List, former governor of Nevada (1979–1983)
- Sid Miller, agriculture commissioner of Texas (2015–present)
- Lia Roberts, former leader of the Nevada Republican Party

Others

- Emil R. Bedard, former deputy commandant for Plans, Policies and Operations in the United States Marine Corps
- Ted Nugent, singer-songwriter and conservative political activist
- Wayne Allyn Root, conservative author, radio host, and conspiracy theorist, and Libertarian nominee for vice president of the United States in 2008
Lisa Song Sutton

U.S. politicians

- Dan Crenshaw, U.S. representative for Texas's 2nd congressional district (2019–present)
- Michele Fiore, former member of the Nevada Assembly (2012-2016), member of the Las Vegas City Council from Ward 6 (2017–present)
- Victoria Seaman, former member of the Nevada Assembly (2014-2016), member of Las Vegas City Council from the 2nd ward (2019–present)
- Elise Stefanik, U.S. representative for New York's 21st congressional district (2015–present)
- Amy Tarkanian, former chairwoman of the Nevada Republican Party

==== Primary results ====
Republican primary results
| Party | Candidate | Votes | % |
|---|---|---|---|
| Republican | Jim Marchant | 15,760 | 34.8 |
| Republican | Sam Peters | 12,755 | 28.1 |
| Republican | Lisa Song Sutton | 6,846 | 15.1 |
| Republican | Charles Navarro | 2,870 | 6.3 |
| Republican | Rebecca Wood | 2,847 | 6.3 |
| Republican | Leo Blundo | 1,923 | 4.2 |
| Republican | Rosalie Bingham | 1,331 | 2.9 |
| Republican | Randi Reed | 1,023 | 2.3 |
| Total votes | | 45,355 | 100.0 |

=== General election ===
==== Post-primary endorsements ====
Jim Marchant (R)

U.S. politicians

- Donald Trump, president of the United States

==== Predictions ====
| Source | Ranking | As of |
|---|---|---|
| The Cook Political Report | Likely D | November 2, 2020 |
| Inside Elections | Safe D | October 28, 2020 |
| Sabato's Crystal Ball | Likely D | November 2, 2020 |
| Politico | Lean D | November 2, 2020 |
| Daily Kos | Tossup | November 1, 2020 |
| RCP | Likely D | November 2, 2020 |
| Niskanen | Tossup | November 1, 2020 |

==== Results ====
Nevada's 4th congressional district, 2020
| Party | Candidate | Votes | % |
|---|---|---|---|
| Democratic | Steven Horsford (incumbent) | 168,457 | 50.7 |
| Republican | Jim Marchant | 152,284 | 45.8 |
| Libertarian | Jonathan Royce Esteban | 7,978 | 2.4 |
| Independent American | Barry Rubinson | 3,750 | 1.1 |
| Total votes | | 332,469 | 100.0 |
| Democratic hold | | | |

== See also ==
- 2020 Nevada elections

== Notes ==
Partisan clients
