= 2024 Nevada Republican presidential nominating contests =

2024 Nevada Republican presidential primary and caucus
- Presidential primary (non-binding)
- February 6, 2024

No Republican National Convention delegates
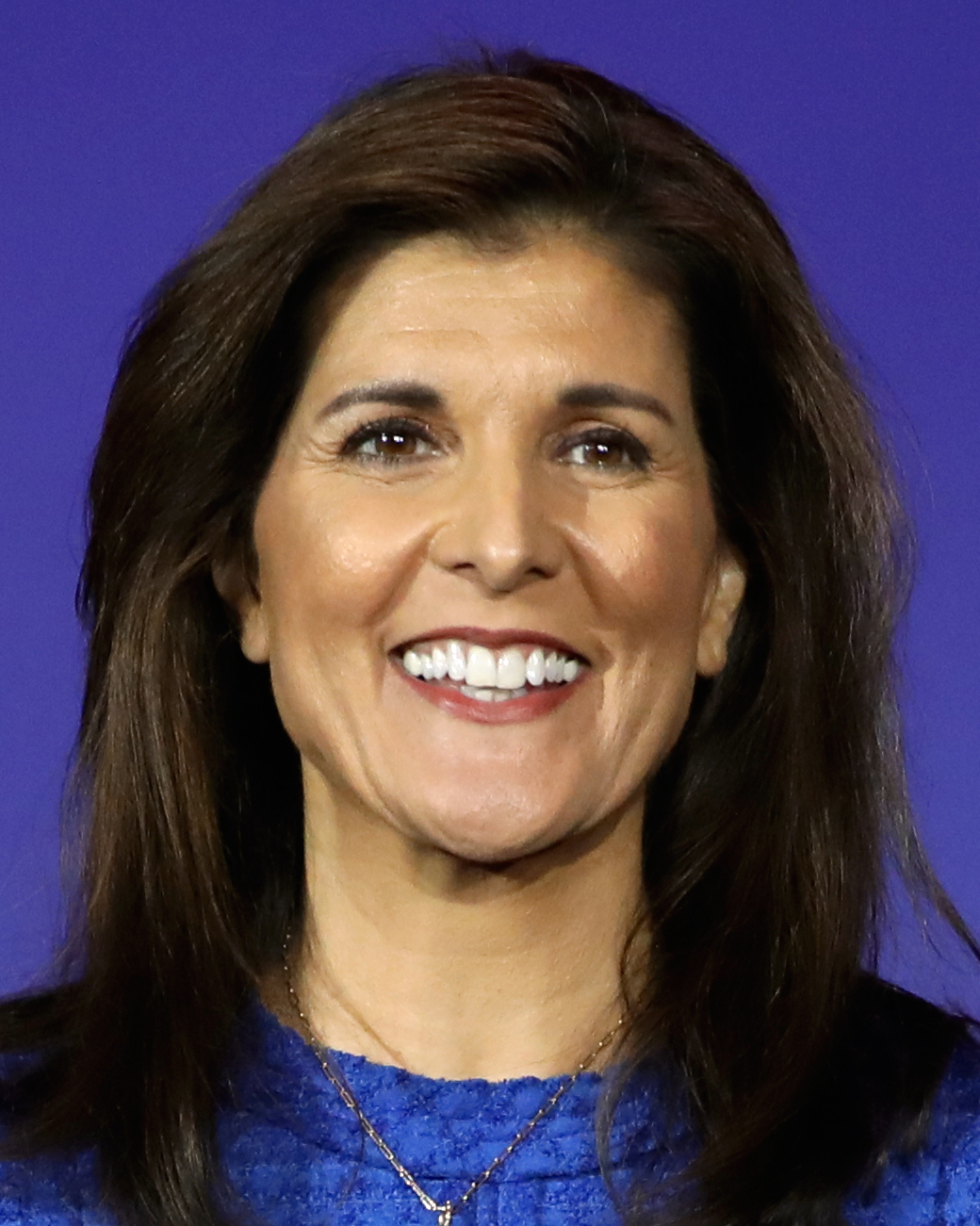

Candidate	Nikki Haley (Note: Despite receiving fewer votes than None of These Candidates, Haley officially won the primary. Under Nevada state law, "only votes cast for the named candidates shall be counted" for the purposes of declaring the winner of an election.)	None of These Candidates
Home state	South Carolina	–
Popular vote	24,583	50,763
Percentage	30.63%	63.26%
Results by county
None of These Candidates
50 – 60%
60 – 70%
70 – 80%
80 – 90%
- Presidential caucuses
- February 8, 2024

26 Republican National Convention delegates

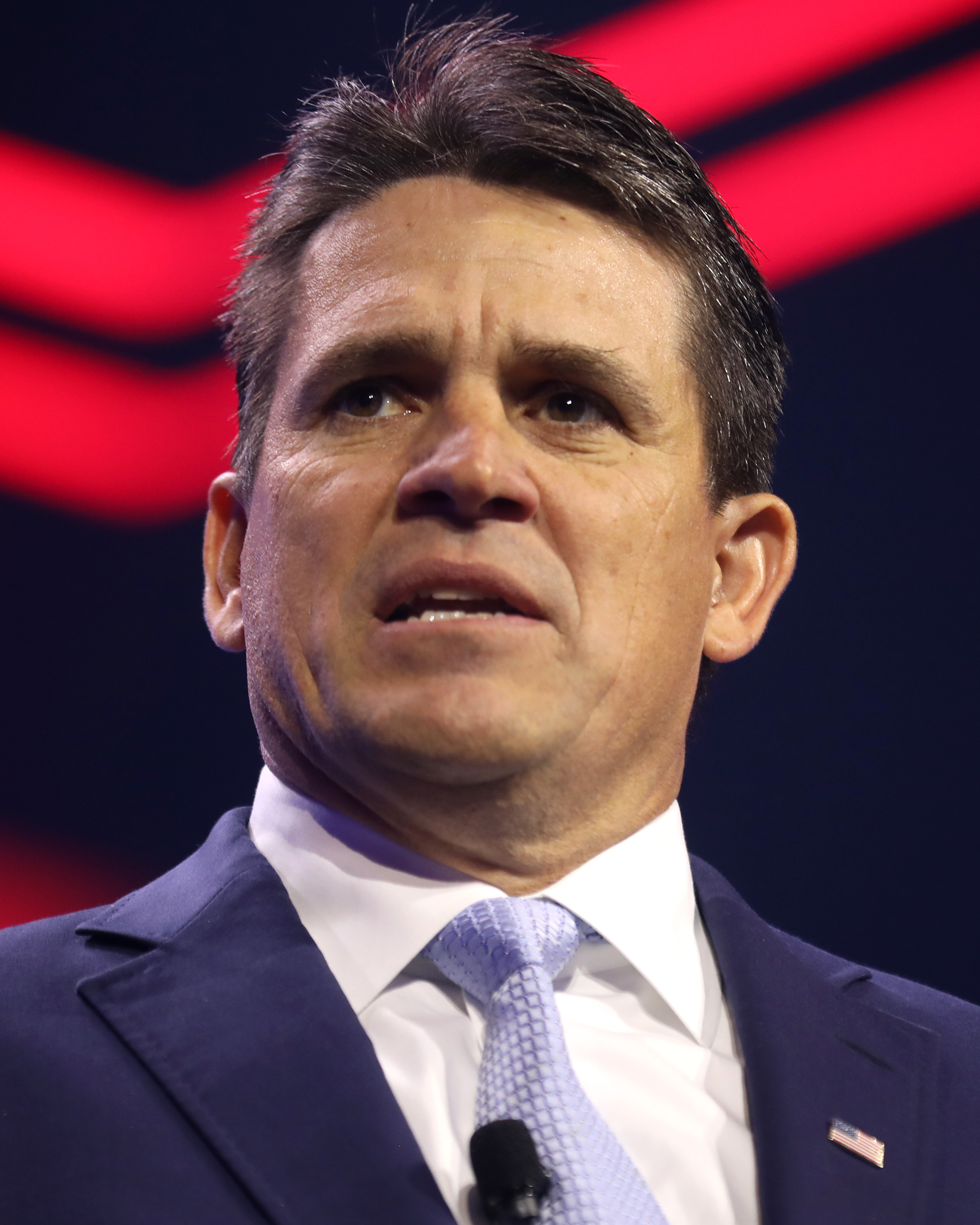
Candidate	Donald Trump	Ryan Binkley
Home state	Florida	Texas
Delegate count	26	0
Popular vote	59,982	536
Percentage	99.11%	0.89%
Trump
>90%

The 2024 Nevada Republican presidential primary and caucus were held on February 6 and 8, 2024, respectively, as part of the Republican Party primaries for the 2024 presidential election. 26 delegates to the 2024 Republican National Convention were allocated on a proportional basis in the caucus. They were held following the Iowa caucuses and the New Hampshire primary.

On August 14, 2023, Republicans in Nevada announced that they would boycott and ignore the non-binding, state-organized primary due to opposition to the establishment of a primary process over the traditional caucus format in the state's presidential preference contests. The state-run primary was held on February 6, while the Nevada Republican Party held its own caucus on February 8.

Nikki Haley lost the popular vote in the non-binding Nevada primary to the ballot option of None of These Candidates. Although None of These Candidates received more votes, Haley was the official winner of the primary. Trump won the party-organized caucus without any major opponent.

== Background ==
=== Controversy ===
The Democratic-controlled Nevada Legislature, supported by former senator Harry Reid, moved to establish a presidential primary in 2021 for the Republican and Democratic parties, following the "havoc" of the 2020 Iowa Democratic presidential caucuses. Previously, party-organized caucuses were used to determine delegates in presidential elections. In May 2023, the Republican Party sued the state of Nevada, because they preferred to keep using the caucuses to determine their delegate allocation.

The Republican primary required more than one Republican candidate to file by October 16, 2023. Nevada Republicans said that they would instead hold a party-organized caucus on February 8, 2024. To participate in the caucus, Republican candidates needed to register their candidacy with the Nevada Republican Party in a filing window from September 1, 2023, to October 15, 2023 and needed to pay a fee of $55,000. Multiple media articles also reported that appearing on the primary ballot would bar candidates from participating in the caucus and that party rules about SuperPACs were tightened to protect Trump.

Nikki Haley (as well as two other presidential candidates) still opted for the primary, though they could not win any delegates. As the only remaining major candidate on the primary ballot by the time of the election, she had decided early on not to campaign or spend funds in the state, and her campaign explained that she had not entered the caucus either because the process was in their view "rigged for Trump". Republican state and county leaders reacted by advising voters to choose "None of the Above" instead of Haley to demonstrate their boycott of the primary, leading to early speculation that the option would win the primary instead.

=== Procedure ===
Delegates are proportionally allocated to candidates who receive at least 3.85% of the votes in the caucus on February 8, 2024. Votes in the primary on February 6, 2024, will not be included in determining delegate allocation.

== Candidates ==
The filing deadline for the Nevada primary was on October 16, 2023. The office of the Secretary of State of Nevada published the list of qualified candidates on October 20. The filing window for the Nevada caucus was between September 1 and October 15. The party published their own list of candidates and did not allow those who filed for the state-run primary to participate.

The state of Nevada, per a law enacted in 1975, will also allow voters in the primary to cast a vote for "None of these Candidates." Local news outlets in Nevada reported that it was plausible that Nikki Haley could face a competitive race against "None of these candidates" because Nevada voters, including those who wished to support Trump in the caucus but couldn't vote for him in the primary, were allowed to participate in both the primary and the caucus.

Primary candidates

- John Anthony Castro
- Heath V. Fulkerson
- Nikki Haley
- Donald Kjornes
- Mike Pence (withdrawn)
- Tim Scott (withdrawn)
- Hirsh V. Singh (withdrawn)
- None of these Candidates

Caucus candidates (Note: Chris Christie, Doug Burgum, Ron DeSantis, and Vivek Ramaswamy were originally on the ballot, but have been removed since they all suspended their campaigns.)

- Ryan Binkley
- Donald Trump

== Campaign ==
In March 2023, it was reported that Trump hosted a range of Nevada Republican Party officials at Mar-a-Lago as part of his campaign's "aggressive outreach to state and local party officials in the early primary states."

The two contests have led to some confusion among voters, where they have questioned why Trump is not listed on the primary ballot, with thousands of them calling in to request clarification.

== Endorsements ==
=== Primary ===
None of These Candidates

Statewide executive officials

- Joe Lombardo, Governor of Nevada (2023–present)
- Stavros Anthony, Lieutenant Governor of Nevada (2023–present)

=== Caucus ===
Ron DeSantis (withdrawn)

Former federal executive official

- Nick Trutanich, U.S. Attorney for the District of Nevada (2019–2021)

Former U.S. Representative

- Cresent Hardy, NV-04 (2015–2017)

Former state executive officials

- Adam Laxalt, Attorney General (2015–2019); Republican nominee for U.S. Senator in 2022 and Governor in 2018 (previously endorsed Donald Trump)
- Andy Matthews, Controller (2023–present)
- Patty Cafferata, State Treasurer (1983–1987)

State senators

- Carrie A. Buck, District 5 (2020–present); Assistant Minority Leader (2023–present)
- Jeff Stone, District 20 (2022–present); Western Regional Director of the U.S. Department of Labor (2019–2021); California State Senator from District 28 (2014–2019)
- Keith Pickard, District 20 (2018–2022); Nevada State Assemblyman from District 22 (2016–2018)

State representatives

- Danielle Gallant, District 23 (2022–present); Assistant Minority Floor Leader (South) (2023–present)
- Jill Dickman, District 31 (2014–2016 and 2020–present); Assistant Minority Floor Leader (North) (2023–present); Assistant Majority Whip (North) (2015–2017)
- Edwin Goedhart, District 36 (2006–2012)
- Jim Wheeler, District 39 (2012–2022); Minority Leader (2017–2019)
- Kelly Kite, District 39 (2010–2012)

Notable individuals

- Robert Bigelow, owner of Budget Suites of America and founder of Bigelow Aerospace
- Chuck Muth, political consultant; former executive director of the Nevada Republican Party
Donald Trump

Former federal official

- Steven Cheung, Special Assistant to the President (2017–2018)

Statewide executive officials

- Joe Lombardo, governor (2023–present)
- Stavros Anthony, lieutenant governor (2023–present)

Former state executive official

- ~~Adam Laxalt, Attorney General (2015–2019)~~ (switched endorsement to Ron DeSantis)

Former state representative

- Jim Marchant, District 37 (2016–2018); Republican nominee in the 2022 Nevada Secretary of State election

County official

- Michele Fiore, Nye County Justice of the Peace (2022–present)

Notable individual

- Wayne Allyn Root, TV and radio host

== Polling ==
Source of poll aggregation	Dates administered	Dates updated	Donald Trump	Other/ Undecided (Note: Calculated by taking the difference of 100% and all other candidates combined.)	Margin
RealClearPolling	September 29, 2023 – January 8, 2024	January 21, 2024	69.0%	31.0% (Note: Ron DeSantis 10.5% Vivek Ramaswamy 5.0% Chris Christie 3.0%)	Trump +58.5

Poll source	Date(s) administered	Sample size (Note: Key: A – all adults RV – registered voters LV – likely voters V – unclear)	Margin of error	None of these Candidates	Chris Christie	Ron DeSantis	Nikki Haley	Asa Hutchinson	Mike Pence	Vivek Ramaswamy	Tim Scott	Donald Trump	Other	Undecided
McLaughlin & Associates (Note: Poll sponsored by Trump's campaign)	Dec 11–13, 2023	400 (LV)	± 4.9%		5%	15%	–	–	–	2%	–	75%	0% (Note: Ryan Binkley with 0%)	3%
Revere Solutions/Providence	January 28-29, 2024	476(LV)	± 4.0%	59.2%	–	–	40.8%	–	–	–	–	–	–	–
SSRS/CNN	Sep 29 – October 6, 2023	650 (LV)	± 5.3%		2%	13%	6%	–	3%	4%	2%	65%	4% (Note: "Someone else" with 2%; Doug Burgum & Larry Elder with 1%; Will Hurd & Perry Johnson with 0%)	2%
National Research (Note: Poll sponsored by American Greatness PAC)	Jun 26–28, 2023	500 (LV)	± 4.4%		3%	22%	3%	0%	2%	2%	2%	52%	–	14% (Note: Other, undecided, and refused)
National Research	May 30 – June 1, 2023	500 (LV)	± 4.4%		–	21%	3%	0%	1%	2%	2%	53%	0% (Note: Chris Sununu with 0%)	17%
Vote TXT	May 15–19, 2023	112 (RV)	± 4.8%		–	21%	5%	–	2%	3%	–	51%	7%	11%
Susquehanna Polling & Research	Oct 24–27, 2022	500 (LV)	± 4.3%		–	34%	1%	–	7%	–	–	41%	7% (Note: Ted Cruz with 5%; Mike Pompeo and Marco Rubio with 1%; Larry Hogan with 0%)	10%

== Results ==
Nikki Haley's popular vote share by county 10-20% 20-30% 30-40% 40-50%

=== Primary ===
Nevada Republican primary, February 6, 2024
Candidate	Votes	Percentage			
Candidate	Votes	Percentage	None of These Candidates	50,763	63.26%
Nikki Haley	24,583	30.63%			
Mike Pence (withdrawn)	3,091	3.85%			
Tim Scott (withdrawn)	1,081	1.35%			
John Anthony Castro	270	0.34%			
Hirsh V. Singh (withdrawn)	200	0.25%			
Donald Kjornes	166	0.21%			
Heath V. Fulkerson	95	0.12%			
Total:	80,249	100.00%			

By county

County	None of These Candidates		Nikki Haley		Others		Margin		Total votes
County	%	#	%	#	%	#	%	#	Total votes
Carson City	59.48%	1,763	34.14%	1,012	6.37%	189	25.34%	751	2,964
Churchill	65.80%	962	26.33%	385	7.87%	115	39.47%	577	1,462
Clark	63.75%	25,074	29.64%	11,659	6.61%	2,596	34.11%	13,415	39,329
Douglas	64.34%	3,643	31.74%	1,797	3.92%	222	32.60%	1,846	5,662
Elko	76.36%	2,255	17.30%	511	6.34%	187	59.06%	1,744	2,953
Esmeralda	74.12%	63	17.65%	15	8.23%	7	56.47%	48	85
Eureka	84.04%	158	10.11%	19	5.85%	11	73.93%	139	188
Humboldt	75.73%	774	17.42%	178	6.85%	70	58.31%	596	1,022
Lander	75.77%	269	16.62%	59	7.61%	27	59.15%	210	355
Lincoln	71.15%	296	20.67%	86	8.18%	34	50.48%	210	416
Lyon	74.93%	2,415	19.95%	643	5.12%	165	54.98%	1,772	3,223
Mineral	77.18%	230	17.45%	52	5.37%	16	59.73%	178	298
Nye	80.56%	2,171	15.10%	407	4.34%	117	65.46%	1,764	2,695
Pershing	71.79%	257	20.95%	75	7.26%	26	50.84%	182	358
Storey	70.75%	225	24.53%	78	4.72%	15	46.22%	147	318
Washoe	53.49%	9,834	40.68%	7,479	5.83%	1,072	12.81%	2,355	18,385
White Pine	69.78%	374	23.88%	128	6.34%	34	45.90%	246	536

=== Caucus ===
Nevada Republican caucus, February 8, 2024
Candidate	Votes	Percentage	Actual delegate count		
Candidate	Votes	Percentage	Bound	Unbound	Total
Donald Trump	59,982	99.11%	25	1 (Note: If a candidate wins all of Nevada's delegates, the NRP chair is automatically unbound. He pledged his support to Trump.)	26
Ryan Binkley	540	0.89%	0	0	0
Total	60,522	100.00%	25	1	26

By county

County	Donald Trump		Ryan Binkley		Margin		Total votes
County	%	#	%	#	%	#	Total votes
Carson City	98.31%	1,918	1.69%	33	96.62%	1,885	1,951
Churchill	99.46%	1,287	0.54%	7	98.92%	1,280	1,294
Clark	99.34%	29,965	0.66%	200	98.67%	29,765	30,165
Douglas	98.45%	4,013	1.55%	63	96.91%	3,950	4,076
Elko	98.90%	2,151	1.10%	24	97.79%	2,127	2,175
Esmeralda	97.40%	75	2.60%	2	94.81%	73	77
Eureka	97.64%	124	2.36%	3	95.28%	121	127
Humboldt	99.31%	865	0.69%	6	98.62%	859	871
Lander	98.82%	417	1.18%	5	97.63%	412	422
Lincoln	99.53%	210	0.47%	1	99.05%	209	211
Lyon	99.58%	3,076	0.42%	13	99.16%	3,063	3,089
Mineral	98.11%	260	1.89%	5	96.23%	255	265
Nye	99.66%	2,035	0.34%	7	99.31%	2,028	2,042
Pershing	98.56%	342	1.44%	5	97.12%	337	347
Storey	99.76%	418	0.24%	1	99.52%	417	419
Washoe	98.70%	12,239	1.30%	161	97.40%	12,078	12,400
White Pine	99.32%	587	0.68%	4	98.65%	583	591

== See also ==
- 2024 Nevada Democratic presidential primary
- 2024 Republican Party presidential primaries
- 2024 United States presidential election
- 2024 United States presidential election in Nevada
- 2024 United States elections

== Notes ==
Partisan clients
