= 2022 Henderson, Nevada mayoral election =

2022 Henderson mayoral election
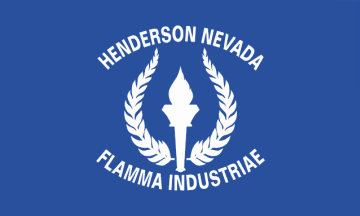
- June 14, 2022

Candidate	Michelle Romero	Frank Ficadenti	Drew Dison
Popular vote	43,311	7,453	6,388
Percentage	75.78%	13.04%	11.18%
- Precinct results Romero: 50–60% 60–70% 70–80% 80–90% Write-ins >90% No votes
Mayor before election
Debra March
Democratic
Elected mayor
Michelle Romero
Republican

The 2022 Henderson mayoral election was held on June 14, 2022, to elect the next mayor of Henderson, Nevada. Term-limited incumbent Democratic Mayor Debra March decided to run for the Nevada lieutenant gubernatorial election.

Republican Michelle Romero easily won the election. The election was officially non-partisan.

== Background ==
Due to a court ruling regarding the elections for the city council and mayor by the Nevada Supreme Court and changes to the law regarding all elections here statewide by the Nevada Legislature and Governor Steve Sisolak, March was not eligible to run for re-election in 2022 due to term limits.

== Candidates ==
- Drew Dison
- Frank Ficadenti, businessman and veteran
- Michelle Romero, Henderson City Councilwoman (2019–present)

== General election ==
=== Campaign ===
Romero was considered the heavy favorite, due to her massive fundraising advantage, having raised over $500,000 by the start of 2022, as well as having received several endorsements from well-known local politicians, such as incumbent mayor Debra March and County Commissioner and former mayor James B. Gibson.

=== Endorsements ===
Michelle Romero

Local officials

- James B. Gibson, Clark County Commissioner (2017–present), former Mayor of Henderson (1997–2009) (Democratic)
- Debra March, mayor of Henderson (2017–present) (Democratic)

State Senators

- Carrie A. Buck, State Senator from the 5th district (2020–present)
- Joe Hardy, State Senator from the 12th district (2010–present)
- Keith Pickard, State Senator from the 20th district (2018–present)
- Michael Roberson, former State Senate Minority Leader and Republican nominee for Lieutenant Governor in 2018

== Results ==
Results
Candidate	Votes	%
Michelle Romero	43,311	75.78%
Frank Ficadenti	7,453	13.04%
Drew Dison	6,388	11.18%
Total votes	57,152	100.00%

== See also ==
- 2022 Nevada elections
