= Sandra Jauregui =

American politician (born 1983)

- Jauregui in 2023

Lieutenant Governor-elect of Nevada
- Assuming office January 4, 2027
- Governor: Aaron Ford (elect)
- Succeeding: Stavros Anthony

Majority Leader of the Nevada Assembly
- Incumbent
- Assumed office February 6, 2023
- Preceded by: Teresa Benitez-Thompson

Member of the Nevada Assembly from the 41st district
- Incumbent
- Assumed office November 9, 2016
- Preceded by: Victoria A. Dooling

Personal details
- Born: October 31, 1983 (age 43) Monterey Park, California, U.S.
- Party: Democratic
- Education: Mt. San Antonio College (attended); University of Nevada, Las Vegas (BA)

Sandra Jauregui (born October 31, 1983) is an American politician who is the lieutenant governor-elect of Nevada. In 2023 she became the Democratic majority leader of the Nevada Assembly. She represents the 41st district, which covers parts of the southern Las Vegas Valley. A survivor of the 2017 Las Vegas shooting, she is a prominent advocate for gun control within the Nevada Assembly.

In October 2025, Jauregui announced her candidacy for Lieutenant Governor of Nevada in the 2026 election. She defeated incumbent Republican Stavros Anthony.

== Personal life and education ==
Jauregui was born in 1983 in Monterey Park, California, and raised in nearby Hacienda Heights. She is Latina. Jauregui attended Mt. San Antonio College and graduated from the University of Nevada, Las Vegas.

Jauregui is a survivor of the 2017 Las Vegas shooting, the deadliest mass shooting in United States history.

== Career ==
Jauregui works for Ticor Title of Nevada and previously worked for former U.S. Senator Harry Reid.

Jauregui ran for the open seat vacated by the retiring Victoria A. Dooling in 2016. She defeated former Assemblyman Paul Aizley in the Democratic primary and Republican Nick Phillips in the general election.

== Legislative history ==
Jauregui has sponsored several bills related to gun control. In 2019, Jauregui became the primary sponsor of AB291, a red flag law that allows temporary seizure of guns by court order if a person is deemed a danger to themselves or others. The law also banned bump stocks. The bill was signed into law by Nevada Governor Steve Sisolak on June 14, 2019.

In 2023, she sponsored two other gun control bills, ABs 354 and 355, the first of which would have banned carrying a gun within 100 yards of a polling place, and the last would have raised the legal age to buy an assault weapon from 18 to 21. The two bills passed the Nevada Legislature but were vetoed by Governor Joe Lombardo.

Jauregui is the current Democratic majority leader of the Nevada Assembly.

== Electoral history ==
Nevada Assembly District 41 Democratic primary, 2016
Party	Candidate	Votes	%
Democratic	Sandra Jauregui	992	55.9%
Democratic	Paul Aizley	783	44.1%
Total votes		1,775	100.0%

Nevada Assembly District 41 election, 2016
Party	Candidate	Votes	%
Democratic	Sandra Jauregui	13,801	53.2%
Republican	Nick Phillips	12,119	46.8%
Total votes		25,920	100.0%

Nevada Assembly
Preceded by Teresa Benitez-Thompson	Majority Leader of the Nevada Assembly; 2023–present	Incumbent
Party political offices
Preceded by Lisa Cano Burkhead	Democratic nominee for Lieutenant Governor of Nevada; 2026	Most recent
Political offices
Preceded by Stavros Anthony	Lieutenant Governor of Nevada; Taking office 2027	Elect
