= 2022 Nevada lieutenant gubernatorial election =

- November 8, 2022
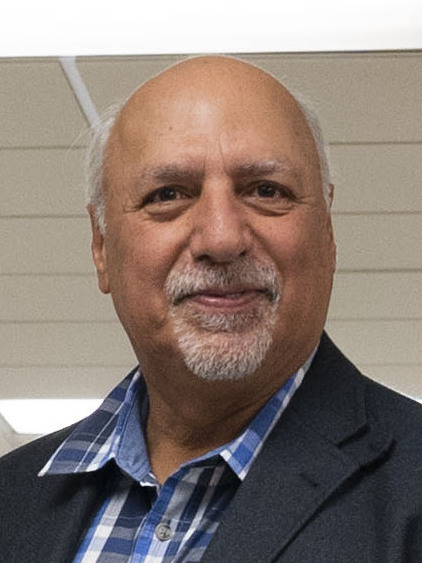

Nominee	Stavros Anthony	Lisa Cano Burkhead
Party	Republican	Democratic
Popular vote	500,994	463,871
Percentage	49.41%	45.75%
- Anthony: 40–50% 50–60% 60–70% 70–80% 80–90% >90% Cano Burkhead: 40–50% 50–60% 60–70% 70–80% 80–90% >90% Tie: 40–50% 50% No votes
Lieutenant Governor before election
Lisa Cano Burkhead
Democratic
Elected Lieutenant Governor
Stavros Anthony
Republican

The 2022 Nevada lieutenant gubernatorial election occurred on November 8, 2022, to elect the lieutenant governor of the state of Nevada. The election coincided with various other federal and state elections, including for Governor of Nevada. Primary elections were held on June 14. Nevada is one of 21 states that elects its lieutenant governor separately from its governor.

Incumbent Democratic Lieutenant Governor Lisa Cano Burkhead was appointed by Governor Steve Sisolak on December 16, 2021, to succeed Kate Marshall, who resigned to join the Biden administration. She lost in her bid for a full term to Republican candidate Stavros Anthony.

== Background ==
Kate Marshall was first elected as lieutenant governor in 2018 with 50.4% of the vote against Michael Roberson, who was minority leader of the Nevada State Senate at the time. On September 17, 2021, she resigned from the position to work in the White House Office of Intergovernmental Affairs. After roughly three months of the seat being vacant, school teacher, principal, and former candidate for the Nevada Assembly Lisa Cano Burkhead was appointed in December 2021.

== Democratic primary ==
=== Background ===
Kimi Cole, the Chair of the Nevada Rural Democratic Caucus, was the first Democratic candidate to announce their candidacy on November 12, 2021. She gained attention by some due to the fact that she is transgender, and, if elected, would be the first statewide elected transgender official in the United States. Henderson mayor Debra March would announce her candidacy a few weeks later, on November 24, 2021, being the only one to have been elected to public office. Lisa Cano Burkhead, the appointed Lieutenant Governor, announced her candidacy on December 16, 2021. By the end of the year, March led with a sizable lead in terms of fundraising, raising over $380,000 by the end of 2021, with Burkhead in second at nearly $78,000, and Cole in a distant third at just under $34,000.

=== Candidates ===
==== Nominee ====
- Lisa Cano Burkhead, incumbent lieutenant governor

==== Eliminated in primary ====
- Eva Chase, MGM Resorts International employee
- Kimi Cole, chair of Nevada Rural Democratic Caucus
- Debra March, mayor of Henderson

=== Endorsements ===
Debra March

U.S. Senators

- Richard Bryan, U.S. Senator from Nevada (1989–2001)

Local officials

- James B. Gibson, Clark County Commissioner (2017–present), former Mayor of Henderson (1997–2009)
- Alexis Hill, Washoe County Commissioner (2021–present)

Newspapers

- Las Vegas Sun (dual endorsement with Lisa Cano Burkhead)
Lisa Cano Burkhead

U.S. Senators

- Jacky Rosen, U.S. Senator from Nevada (2019–present) and former U.S. Representative for Nevada's 3rd congressional district (2017–2019)

Statewide officials

- Steve Sisolak, Governor of Nevada (2019–2023) and former Chair of Clark County Commission (2013–2019)

Newspapers

- Las Vegas Sun (dual endorsement with Debra March)

Labor unions

- Nevada AFL–CIO

=== Results ===
Results by county Burkhead: 30–40%; 40–50%; 50–60%; March: 30–40%; None of these candidates: 30–40%

Democratic primary results
Party	Candidate	Votes	%
Democratic	Lisa Cano Burkhead (incumbent)	98,746	57.67%
Democratic	Debra March	40,344	23.56%
Democratic	Kimi Cole	14,065	8.21%
None of These Candidates		10,853	6.34%
Democratic	Eva Chase	7,212	4.21%
Total votes		171,220	100.0%

== Republican primary ==
=== Candidates ===
==== Nominee ====
- Stavros Anthony, Las Vegas city councilor

==== Eliminated in primary ====
- Tony Grady Jr., U.S. Air Force pilot
- M. Kameron Hawkins, founder of Hawkins for Nevada Foundation and activist
- John Miller, Las Vegas City councilman
- Mack Miller, business consultant and candidate for Nevada State Assembly in 2020
- Peter Pavone, businessman and entertainer
- Dan Schwartz, former Nevada State Treasurer (2015–2019); candidate for Governor in 2018 and Nevada's 3rd congressional district in 2020

=== Endorsements ===
Stavros Anthony

Organizations

- Gun Owners of America
- Nevada Republican Party

=== Polling ===
Poll source	Date(s) administered	Sample size (Note: Key: A – all adults RV – registered voters LV – likely voters V – unclear)	Margin of error	Stavros Anthony	Tom Grady Jr.	John Miller	Mack Miller	Dan Schwartz	None of these candidates	Other	Undecided
OH Predictive Insights	June 6–7, 2022	525 (LV)	± 4.4%	19%	8%	9%	4%	9%	8%	2% (Note: Hawkins and Pavone with 1%)	42%

=== Results ===
Results by county Anthony: 30–40%; Grady: 20–30%; 30–40%; 40–50%; Miller: 30–40%; None of these candidates: 20–30%

Republican primary results
Party	Candidate	Votes	%
Republican	Stavros Anthony	68,232	30.70%
Republican	Tony Grady Jr.	55,246	24.86%
Republican	John Miller	35,805	16.11%
Republican	Dan Schwartz	27,331	12.30%
None of These Candidates		18,374	8.27%
Republican	Mack Miller	8,588	3.86%
Republican	M. Kameron Hawkins	4,971	2.24%
Republican	Peter Pavone	3,692	1.66%
Total votes		222,239	100.0%

== Independents and third-party candidates ==
=== Candidates ===
==== Nominees ====
- John "Trey" Delap (Independent), nonprofit group consultant
- William Hoge (Independent American), former Republican California state assemblyman (1992–1996) and Independent candidate for Nevada State Treasurer in 2018
- Javi "Trujillo" Tachiquin (Libertarian), MMA fighter

== General election ==
=== Post-primary endorsements ===
Lisa Cano Burkhead (D)

Organizations

- EMILY's List
Starvos Anthony (R)

Newspapers

- Las Vegas Review-Journal

=== Polling ===
Poll source	Date(s) administered	Sample size	Margin of error	Lisa Cano Burkhead (D)	Stavros Anthony (R)	None of these candidates	Other	Undecided
OH Predictive Insights	September 20–29, 2022	741 (LV)	± 3.6%	29%	40%	4%	3% (Note: Hoge (IA) with 2%; Tachiquin (L) with 1%; Delap (I) with <1%)	23%

=== Results ===
2022 Nevada lieutenant gubernatorial election
Party	Candidate	Votes	%	±%
Republican	Stavros Anthony	500,994	49.41%	+5.75%
Democratic	Lisa Cano Burkhead (incumbent)	463,871	45.75%	−4.60%
None of These Candidates		21,241	2.09%	-0.35%
Libertarian	Javi Tachiquin	11,471	1.13%	N/A
Independent American	William Hoge	8,397	0.83%	−1.64%
Independent	John Delap	7,931	0.78%	N/A
Total votes		1,013,905	100.00%	N/A
Republican gain from Democratic				

==== By county ====
County	Lisa Cano Burkhead Democratic		Stavros Anthony Republican		Various candidates Other parties		Margin		Total votes cast
County	#	%	#	%	#	%	#	%	Total votes cast
Carson City	9,364	39.81%	12,784	54.35%	1,375	5.85%	3,420	14.54%	23,523
Churchill	2,080	21.18%	7,061	71.90%	679	6.91%	4,981	50.72%	9,820
Clark	335,446	49.47%	312,329	46.06%	30,321	4.47%	−23,117	−3.41%	678,096
Douglas	8,455	29.37%	19,070	66.25%	1,261	4.38%	10,615	36.88%	28,786
Elko	2,903	18.02%	12,113	75.18%	1,095	6.80%	9,210	57.17%	16,111
Esmeralda	62	13.75%	337	74.72%	52	11.53%	275	60.98%	451
Eureka	53	6.80%	659	84.60%	67	8.60%	606	77.79%	779
Humboldt	1,149	18.92%	4,495	74.03%	428	7.05%	3,346	55.11%	6,072
Lander	309	14.05%	1,655	75.23%	236	10.73%	1,346	61.18%	2,200
Lincoln	254	11.83%	1,705	79.41%	188	8.76%	1,451	67.58%	2,147
Lyon	5,607	23.90%	16,345	69.66%	1,513	6.45%	10,738	45.76%	23,465
Mineral	558	29.71%	1,133	60.33%	187	9.96%	575	30.62%	1,878
Nye	5,461	26.36%	14,008	67.62%	1,248	6.02%	8,547	41.26%	20,717
Pershing	364	20.52%	1,269	71.53%	141	7.95%	905	51.01%	1,774
Storey	641	25.15%	1,729	67.83%	179	7.02%	1,088	42.68%	2,549
Washoe	90,557	47.14%	91,722	47.74%	9,834	5.12%	1,165	0.61%	192,113
White Pine	608	17.76%	2,580	75.35%	236	6.89%	1,972	57.59%	3,424
Totals	463,871	45.75%	500,994	49.41%	49,040	4.84%	37,123	3.66%	1,013,905

Counties that flipped from Democratic to Republican

- Washoe (largest municipality: Reno)

==== By congressional district ====
Despite losing the state, Cano Burkhead won three of four congressional districts.

District	Cano Burkhead	Anthony	Representative
1st	49%	46%	Dina Titus
2nd	39%	55%	Mark Amodei
3rd	49%	47%	Susie Lee
4th	48%	47%	Steven Horsford

== Notes ==
Partisan clients
