= Lynn Stewart =

Lynn Stewart may refer to:

- Lynn D. Stewart (businessman) (born 1943), co-founder of Hooters
- Lynn D. Stewart (politician) (born 1941), American politician
- Lynn Stewart (Black Lightning), a fictional character

== See also ==
- The True Story of Lynn Stuart, a 1958 American biographical crime drama film
- Lynne Stewart (1939–2017), American defense attorney
- Lynne Marie Stewart (1946–2025), American actress
