= 2022 Nevada State Treasurer election =

- November 8, 2022
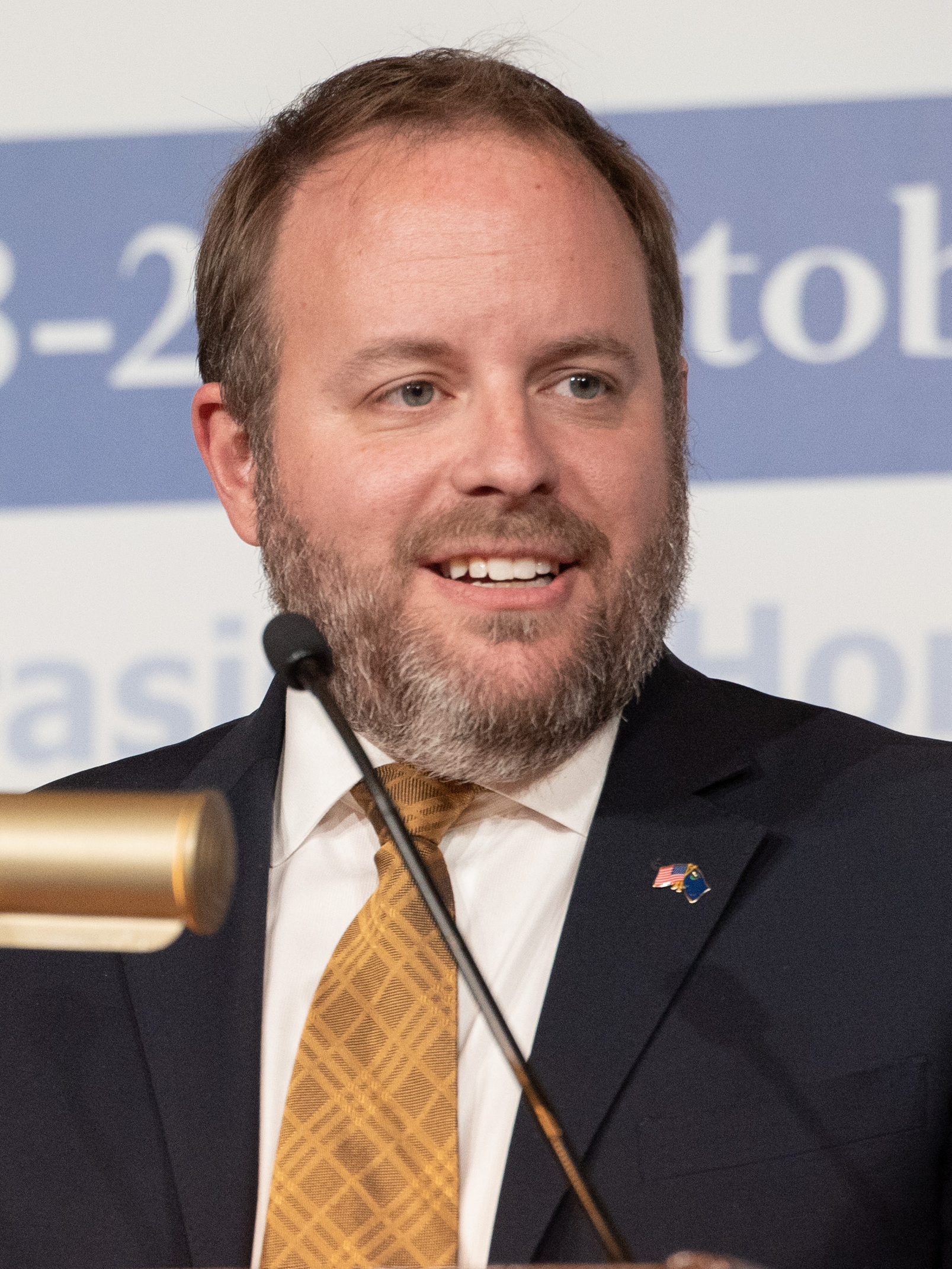

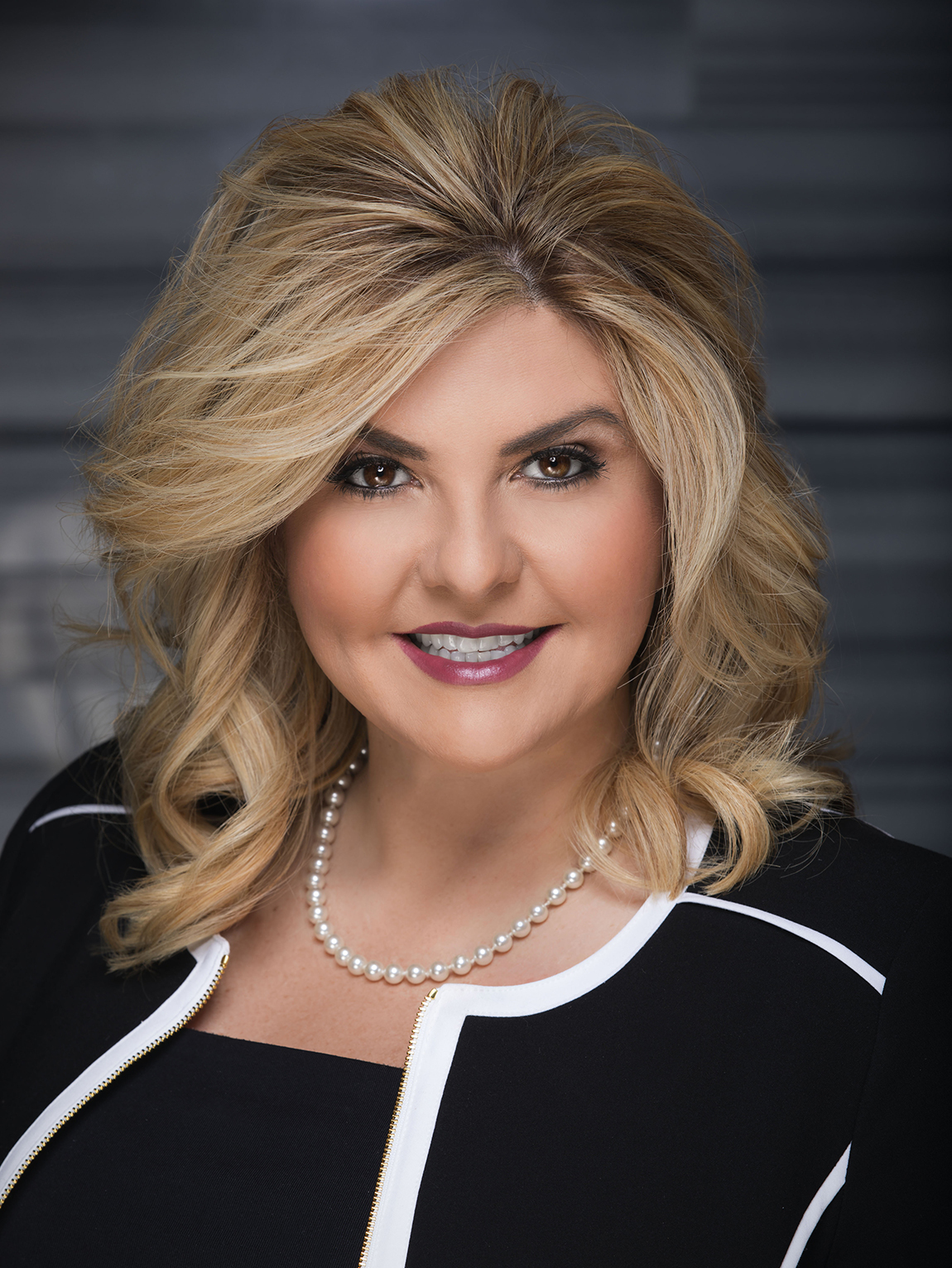
Nominee	Zach Conine	Michele Fiore
Party	Democratic	Republican
Popular vote	482,762	465,570
Percentage	47.70%	46.00%
- Conine: 40–50% 50–60% 60–70% 70–80% 80–90% >90% Fiore: 40–50% 50–60% 60–70% 70–80% 80–90% >90% Tie: 40–50% 50% No votes
State Treasurer before election
Zach Conine
Democratic
Elected State Treasurer
Zach Conine
Democratic

The 2022 Nevada State Treasurer election took place on November 8, 2022, to elect the Nevada State Treasurer. Incumbent Democratic Treasurer Zach Conine won re-election to a second term. With a margin of 1.7%, this was the closest state treasurer race of the 2022 election cycle.

== Democratic primary ==
=== Candidates ===
==== Declared ====
- Zach Conine, incumbent treasurer

=== Endorsements ===
Zach Conine

Labor unions

- Nevada AFL–CIO
- United Auto Workers

== Republican primary ==
=== Candidates ===
==== Nominee ====
- Michele Fiore, Las Vegas city councilor (2017–2022), candidate for Nevada's 1st congressional district in 2010 and Nevada's 3rd congressional district in 2016

==== Eliminated ====
- Manny Kess, business owner

=== Endorsements ===
Manny Kess

State officials

- Mark Hutchison, former Lieutenant Governor of Nevada (2015–2019)

=== Polling ===
Poll source	Date(s) administered	Sample size (Note: Key: A – all adults RV – registered voters LV – likely voters V – unclear)	Margin of error	Michele Fiore	Manny Kess	None of These Candidates	Undecided
OH Predictive Insights	May 10–12, 2022	500 (LV)	± 4.4%	42%	12%	19%	27%

=== Results ===
Results by county Fiore: 50–60%; 60–70%

Republican primary results
Party	Candidate	Votes	%
Republican	Michele Fiore	134,184	61.10%
Republican	Manny Kess	65,048	29.62%
None of These Candidates		20,370	9.28%
Total votes		219,602	100.0%

== Independents and third-party candidates ==
=== Candidates ===
==== Nominees ====
- Bryan Elliott (Libertarian), business manager
- Margaret Hendrickson (Independent American)

== General election ==
=== Post-primary endorsements ===
Zach Conine (D)

U.S. Senators

- Dean Heller, U.S. Senator from Nevada (2011–2019), Representative for Nevada's 2nd congressional district (2007–2011), 15th Secretary of State of Nevada (1995–2007), State Assemblyman from the 40th district (1990–1994) (Republican)

Statewide officials

- Bob Seale, 19th Nevada State Treasurer (1991–1999), State Assemblyman from the 21st district (2004–2006) (Republican)

Party officials

- Amy Tarkanian, Chairwoman of the Nevada Republican Party (2011–2012) (Republican)

Newspapers

- Las Vegas Review-Journal

Organizations

- Human Rights Campaign
Michele Fiore (R)

Federal officials

- Ted Cruz, US Senator from Texas

=== Polling ===
Poll source	Date(s) administered	Sample size	Margin of error	Zach Conine (D)	Michele Fiore (R)	None of These Candidates	Other	Undecided
OH Predictive Insights	October 24–27, 2022	600 (LV)	± 4.0%	38%	35%	2%	8% (Note: Elliot (L) with 4%; Hendrickson (IA) with 4%)	17%
University of Nevada, Reno	October 5–19, 2022	577 (LV)	± 4.0%	23%	26%	–	7% (Note: "Some other candidate" with 7%)	44%
OH Predictive Insights	September 20–29, 2022	741 (LV)	± 3.6%	30%	38%	5%	7% (Note: Hendrickson (IA) with 4%; Elliot (L) with 3%)	20%

=== Results ===
2022 Nevada State Treasurer election
Party	Candidate	Votes	%	±%
Democratic	Zach Conine (incumbent)	482,762	47.70%	±0.00%
Republican	Michele Fiore	465,570	46.00%	−1.06%
None of These Candidates		28,058	2.77%	-0.07%
Independent American	Margaret Hendrickson	19,588	1.94%	N/A
Libertarian	Bryan Elliott	16,051	1.59%	N/A
Total votes		1,012,029	100.00%	N/A
Democratic hold				

==== By county ====
County	Zach Conine Democratic		Michele Fiore Republican		Various candidates Other parties		Margin		Total votes cast
County	#	%	#	%	#	%	#	%	Total votes cast
Carson City	10,079	42.81%	11,917	50.62%	1,547	6.57%	−1,838	−7.81%	23,543
Churchill	2,288	23.37%	6,775	69.20%	728	7.44%	−4,487	−45.83%	9,791
Clark	348,516	51.51%	285,803	42.24%	42,258	6.25%	62,713	9.27%	676,577
Douglas	8,994	31.11%	18,367	63.53%	1,552	5.37%	−9,373	−32.42%	28,913
Elko	3,045	18.96%	11,894	74.06%	1,122	6.99%	−8,849	−55.10%	16,061
Esmeralda	59	13.23%	328	73.54%	59	13.23%	−269	−60.31%	446
Eureka	65	8.39%	645	83.23%	65	8.39%	−580	−74.84%	775
Humboldt	1,262	20.82%	4,315	71.19%	484	7.99%	−3,053	−50.37%	6,061
Lander	318	14.42%	1,666	75.52%	222	10.06%	−1,348	−61.11%	2,206
Lincoln	281	13.10%	1,660	77.39%	204	9.51%	−1,379	−64.29%	2,145
Lyon	5,941	25.34%	15,854	67.62%	1,652	7.05%	−9,913	−42.28%	23,447
Mineral	580	30.92%	1,100	58.64%	196	10.45%	−520	−27.72%	1,876
Nye	5,639	27.22%	13,307	64.24%	1,768	8.54%	−7,668	−37.02%	20,714
Pershing	387	21.93%	1,220	69.12%	158	8.95%	−833	−47.20%	1,765
Storey	681	26.74%	1,685	66.16%	181	7.11%	−1,004	−39.42%	2,547
Washoe	93,981	49.01%	86,562	45.14%	11,201	5.84%	7,419	3.87%	191,744
White Pine	646	18.90%	2,472	72.32%	300	8.78%	−1,826	−53.42%	3,418
Totals	482,762	47.70%	465,570	46.00%	63,697	6.29%	17,192	1.70%	1,012,029

Counties that flipped from Republican to Democratic

- Washoe (largest municipality: Reno)

==== By congressional district ====
Conine won three of four congressional districts.

District	Conine	Fiore	Representative
1st	51%	43%	Dina Titus
2nd	41%	53%	Mark Amodei
3rd	51%	43%	Susie Lee
4th	50%	43%	Steven Horsford
