= Melissa Hardy =

American politician

Member of the Nevada Assembly from the 22nd district
- Incumbent
- Assumed office November 7, 2018
- Preceded by: Keith Pickard

Personal details
- Born: 1969 (age 56–57) Las Vegas, Nevada, U.S.
- Party: Republican
- Spouse: David S. Hardy
- Children: 2
- Education: University of Nevada, Las Vegas (BS)
- Website: Hardy 4 Nevada

Melissa Hardy (born 1969) is an American politician serving as a member of the Nevada Assembly from the 22nd district.

== Early life and education ==
Hardy was born in 1969 in Las Vegas, Nevada. After attending Las Vegas High School, Hardy earned a B.S. in hotel and business administration from the University of Nevada, Las Vegas.

== Career ==
Hardy worked as a real estate agent from 1993 to 2007. Hardy is a member of the Henderson Chamber of Commerce. In 2018, Hardy was elected to the Nevada Assembly, where she has been representing the 22nd district since November 7, 2018.

== Personal life ==
Melissa Hardy is married to David S. Hardy. They have two children.
