= Michele Fiore =

American politician (born 1970)

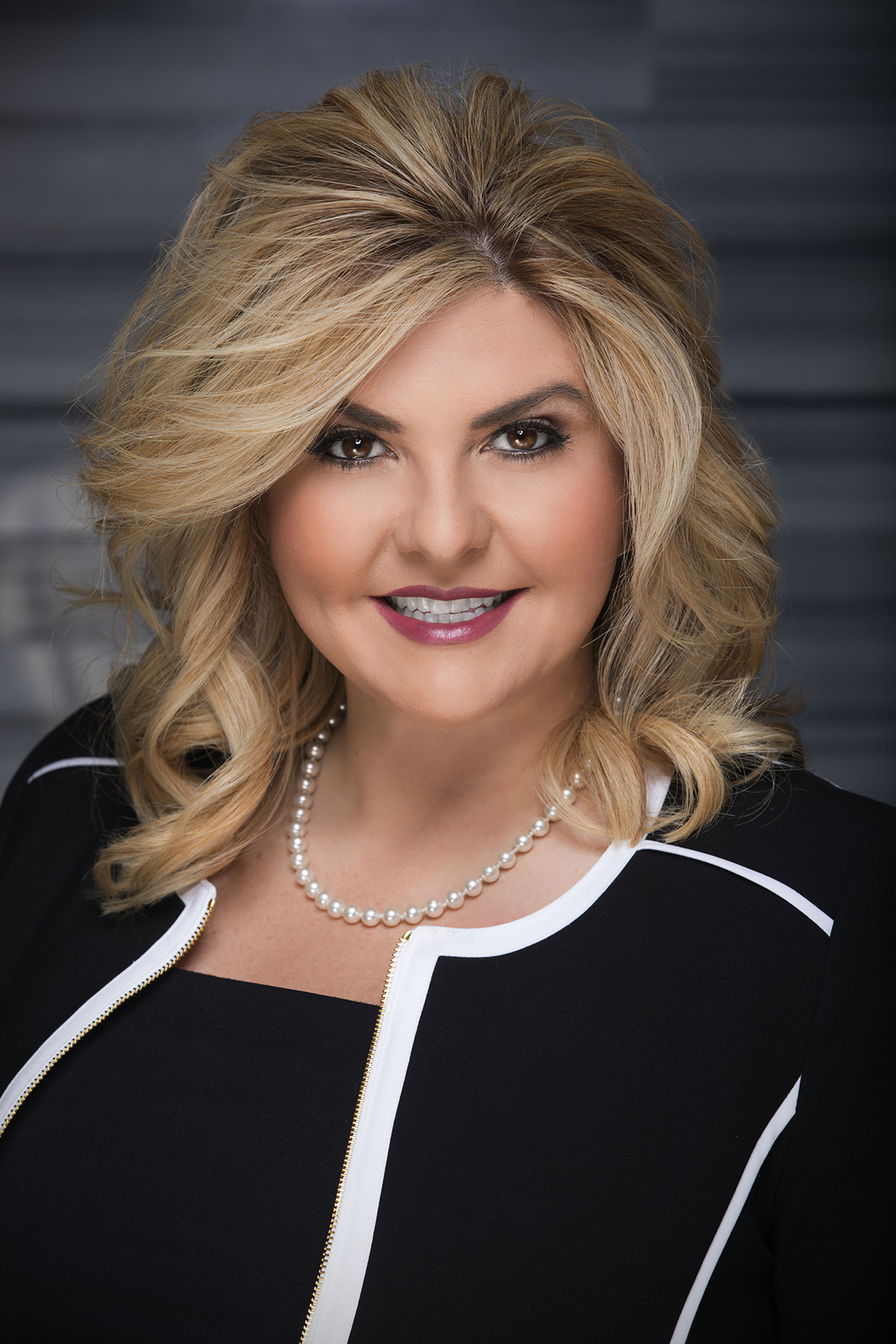
- Fiore in 2016

Member of the Las Vegas City Council from Ward 6
- In office June 21, 2017 – December 7, 2022
- Preceded by: Steven Ross
- Succeeded by: Nancy E. Brune

Mayor pro tempore of Las Vegas
- In office July 3, 2019 – June 16, 2020
- Mayor: Carolyn Goodman
- Preceded by: Lois Tarkanian
- Succeeded by: Stavros Anthony

Member of the Nevada Assembly from the 4th district
- In office November 7, 2012 – November 9, 2016
- Preceded by: Richard McArthur
- Succeeded by: Richard McArthur

Personal details
- Born: Michele Ann Fiore; July 29, 1970 (age 56) New York City, New York, U.S.
- Party: Republican
- Children: 2
- Website: State Assembly website

Michele Ann Fiore (born July 29, 1970) is an American politician and committeewoman for the Nevada Republican Party and justice of the peace for Pahrump in Nye County. She was formerly a member of the Nevada Assembly and the Las Vegas City Council.

In 2024, Fiore was convicted of seven counts of federal felony fraud for stealing $70,000 meant for a memorial to a police officer and spending it on personal expenses including cosmetic surgery. In 2025, she was pardoned by President Donald Trump before she was due to be sentenced.

== Nevada Assembly (2012–2016) ==
Fiore was a member of the Nevada Assembly from 2012 to 2016. Fiore, who represented much of northwestern Clark County, served two Assembly terms.

=== Committee assignments ===
- Assembly Commerce and Labor
- Assembly Judiciary
- Assembly Legislative Operations and Elections
- Assembly Transportation

=== Campus gun carry bill ===
A staunch supporter of gun rights, Fiore sponsored Assembly Bill 148 to allow concealed firearms on the campuses of colleges and grade schools and in day care facilities. In an interview with The New York Times, Fiore said, "If these young, hot little girls on campus have a firearm, I wonder how many men will want to assault them. The sexual assaults that are occurring would go down once these sexual predators get a bullet in their head." In December 2015, Fiore sent her constituents a 2016 calendar that included a family Christmas portrait under the month of December featuring her immediate family all holding guns, and her grandchildren, one of whom was holding what appeared to be a handgun. The photo went viral on Facebook and drew criticism for depicting a small child holding a weapon.

=== Description of treatments possible under right-to-try bill ===
Fiore was a primary sponsor of the 2015 Nevada right-to-try law, legislation that allows doctors to perform medical procedures that are being used in ongoing FDA-approved clinical trials but have not achieved FDA approval for terminally ill patients who are not responding to traditional medical treatment. On a February 2014 edition of her radio show, discussing Right-to-Try, Fiore described the cancer treatment by Cancer is a Fungus author Tullio Simoncini as an example of treatments that the terminally ill could access under Right-to-Try: "If you have cancer, which I believe is a fungus, and we can put a PICC line into your body and we're flushing, let's say, salt water, sodium carbonate, through that line, and flushing out the fungus. ... These are some procedures that are not FDA-approved in America that are very inexpensive, cost-effective."

On her February 21, 2015, broadcast, the theme was the concept of Right-to-Try; the bill had been introduced in the Assembly the previous week. At the top of the show Fiore raised the topic of her 2014 comments, "an issue that I have gotten a lot of questions about". She said, "I made comments about cancer that I didn't put in the proper context." She had had a friend with cancer who had made "radical improvement using a doctor out of Italy's treatment covered in his book and his book was called Cancer Is A Fungus ... it was a tumor therapy of some sort. The point I was trying to illustrate was that people like my friend ... should have the right to decide their own fate and try experimental treatments like this." She did not repeat that cancer is a fungus or that salt water could flush it out. After Fiore addressed the issue she and guest Jackie See, M.D., defended the Simoncini treatment and other alternative techniques as viable and a means by which the U.S. could lead the world medically if regulation and bureaucracy were reduced and doctors could "explor[e] all the treatments not knowing where the next breakthrough will come from." After the 2015 broadcast, she received renewed national attention for her 2014 statements.

Using sodium bicarbonate (baking soda) as a cancer treatment is espoused by Tullio Simoncini and is known as the Simoncini cancer treatment. This method has not been proven, and no evidence suggests that it or treatment with salt water works, but if either were to be accepted under the bill's requirements it could be legally considered a non-FDA-approved treatment that a terminally ill patient in Nevada could request. The bill that Fiore introduced eight days before her 2015 show requires that the drug, product or device "have successfully completed Phase 1 of a clinical trial" and that it be "tested in a clinical trial that has been approved by the [FDA]."

=== Support for same-sex marriage and medical marijuana ===
Fiore is noted for having been the only Republican to vote to lift the ban on same-sex marriage and to legalize medical marijuana.

=== Comments on gun use against law enforcement ===
In March 2016, Fiore was interviewed by the Las Vegas Sun. When asked about her support of militants involved in the occupation of the Malheur National Wildlife Refuge earlier that year, she said,

When the federal government feels they're going to govern Americans by gunpoint, I'm sorry. If government is going to point a gun at me, I'm going to point my gun right back. If you're going to shoot me, I'm going to shoot you back. I ain't going to shoot first, but I ain't going to let you shoot me. It's just not going to happen.

In April 2016, Fiore was interviewed for the KLAS 8 television show "Politics NOW". Discussing whether the 2014 armed resistance against federal agents was justified (the agents were in Bunkerville, Nevada, to confiscate cattle owned by rancher Cliven Bundy because of defaulted grazing fees), she said,

I would never, ever point my firearm at anyone, including an officer of the law, unless they pointed their firearm at me. Now, once you point your firearm at me, I'm sorry, then it becomes self-defense. So, whether you're a stranger, a bad guy, or an officer, and you—you point your gun at me and you're gonna shoot me and I have to decide whether it's my life or your life, well, I choose my life.

In May 2016, the Nevada Association of Public Safety Officers sent a letter denouncing Fiore's statements, concluding,

Ms. Fiore, we no longer see you as a passionate advocate for your Second Amendment rights, which we support. Rather, these comments were utterly irresponsible, an embarrassment to your District and our State, and they continue to demonstrate why you are unqualified to hold the position of United States Congresswoman.

In response, Fiore told KTNV 13 Action News that her original statement referred to federal Bureau of Land Management agents, not local police. She described BLM law enforcement agents as "wannabe cops" and the BLM as "a bureaucratic agency of terrorism that terrorized Americans, especially ranchers." When pressed about the meaning of her previous statement, she said,

If a rogue, unofficial BLM agent that's literally wanting to be a cop—a wannabe police officer—points a gun at me, there's gonna be a problem.

=== Involvement in the Bundy standoff ===
In April 2014, Fiore was interviewed by MSNBC's Chris Hayes and by Fox News's Sean Hannity about the armed confrontation at Bunkerville, Nevada, between law enforcement officers and Cliven Bundy and his supporters. The interviews were shared thousands of times on social media. Fiore said, "The federal government should not show up with guns to collect on a debt" and called for the termination of "whoever ordered this to be done."

=== Statement about wanting to shoot Syrian refugees herself ===
On November 21, 2015, on her weekly AM radio program on KDWN, Fiore explained why she had not signed a Nevada Assembly Republican caucus letter that called for a review of federal safeguards before Nevada would resettle Syrian refugees. She said, "We didn't know anything about the letter, nor did we get invited to be on the letter." She went on, "He's like, 'The Syrian refugees.' I'm like, 'What, are you kidding me? I'm about to fly to Paris and shoot 'em in the head myself.' I mean, I am not OK with Syrian refugees. I'm not OK with terrorists. I'm OK with putting them down, blacking them out. Just put a piece of brass in their ocular cavity and end their miserable life. I'm good with that."

On December 7, 2015, she told the Associated Press, "I was not talking about the refugees." She added, "I do not want Syrian refugees in our state, period", and said that she did not trust the refugee vetting process to screen out terrorists.

=== IRS investigation ===
In December 2014, it was reported that the Internal Revenue Service (IRS) had filed dozens of tax liens totaling about $1 million against Fiore and her home healthcare businesses, Always There 4 You and Always There Personal Care. The liens against the businesses involved unpaid employee payroll taxes. In response, Fiore stated, "I am one hundred percent in compliance with IRS, period." Fiore blamed her ex-husband, who at one time acted as her accountant, and a former employee who stole from her while at the same time sent fraudulent documents to her current accountant to hide the embezzlement.

The fallout from her issues with the IRS led to her being removed as majority leader and chair of the Assembly Taxation Committee. It was reported that she reacted to the removal by saying there was a war on women in the Assembly Republican Caucus. "It was a total misquote," Fiore said. "Nevada Republicans are not waging a war on women. We have a group in our caucus that are waging a war on conservatives."

=== Voiding of home healthcare license ===
On November 3, 2015, the Nevada Department of Health and Human Services's Bureau of Health Care Quality and Compliance (HCQC) voided Fiore's license to operate Always There 4 You, a home healthcare service. Always There 4 You and another Fiore-owned home healthcare service, Always There Personal Care, received about $6 million (net) in Medicaid reimbursements between 2011 and March 2015. Although in Nevada an unannounced inspection of such companies' business records is required to be completed every 18 months, in 2013 and 2015 health department inspectors were blocked several times from reviewing Always There 4 You's records. They were denied access by office staff, by Fiore's mother, and by Fiore.

In July 2015, after receiving a formal warning, Fiore met with health department officials in "a so-called conciliation process that essentially gives Fiore one more chance to comply". Fiore said the meeting was "productive" and she was "prepared to welcome inspectors in the future with coffee and doughnuts." In September 2015 an inspector found the Always There 4 You office dark and its door locked, with no notice posted on the premises explaining why. In October 2015 the Bureau sent a certified letter requesting clarification and again reminding Fiore that her license could be suspended or revoked. Fiore did not reply.

On November 3, after officials arrived to find another business moving into the office location, the Bureau administratively closed the Always There 4 You license and notified Fiore. That night, Fiore issued a press release "regarding allegations that her home health care company was shut down by the government." "With the signing of a Notice Of Dissolution last week, I have completely closed my home health care business. While the media will try to tell you that my business was shut down by the government, I would like to lay that rumor to rest."

The next day, the press release contents, under the title "You're Fired, State Inspectors!" and addressed to "Friends", were published on Fiore's website. "You're Fired, State Inspectors!" reproduces an article titled "When 'They' Win, We All Lose," written for a local magazine the month before, which begins, "By the time you read this, my home health care business will be a memory ... It happened because 'They' won."

Do I allow these bureaucratic agencies to bully their way into my office without notice to extort money from my company claiming my files aren't perfect? Do I put up with them dictating to me, forcing me to pay ridiculous outrageous fees to stay in business, and keep growing it to continually cover the government's greed for more which will be never ending? Or do I shrug my shoulders as "Atlas Shrugged" did and say, you can keep your unnecessary, miserable, burdensome, overtaxation, overregulated and overlegislated BS because I won't participate with you anymore? I didn't realize when I threw those overbearing inspectors out of my office just how much I've tolerated.

In "You're Fired" Fiore disclosed that she had been closing down her business for eight weeks. Always There 4 You was officially dissolved November 9, 2015.

=== 2016 congressional campaign ===
On December 7, 2015, she confirmed that she would not seek reelection, and would instead enter the 2016 race for Nevada's 3rd congressional district in southern Clark County. On June 15, 2016, Fiore placed third in the primary, with 18% of the vote.

== Las Vegas City Council (2017–2022) ==
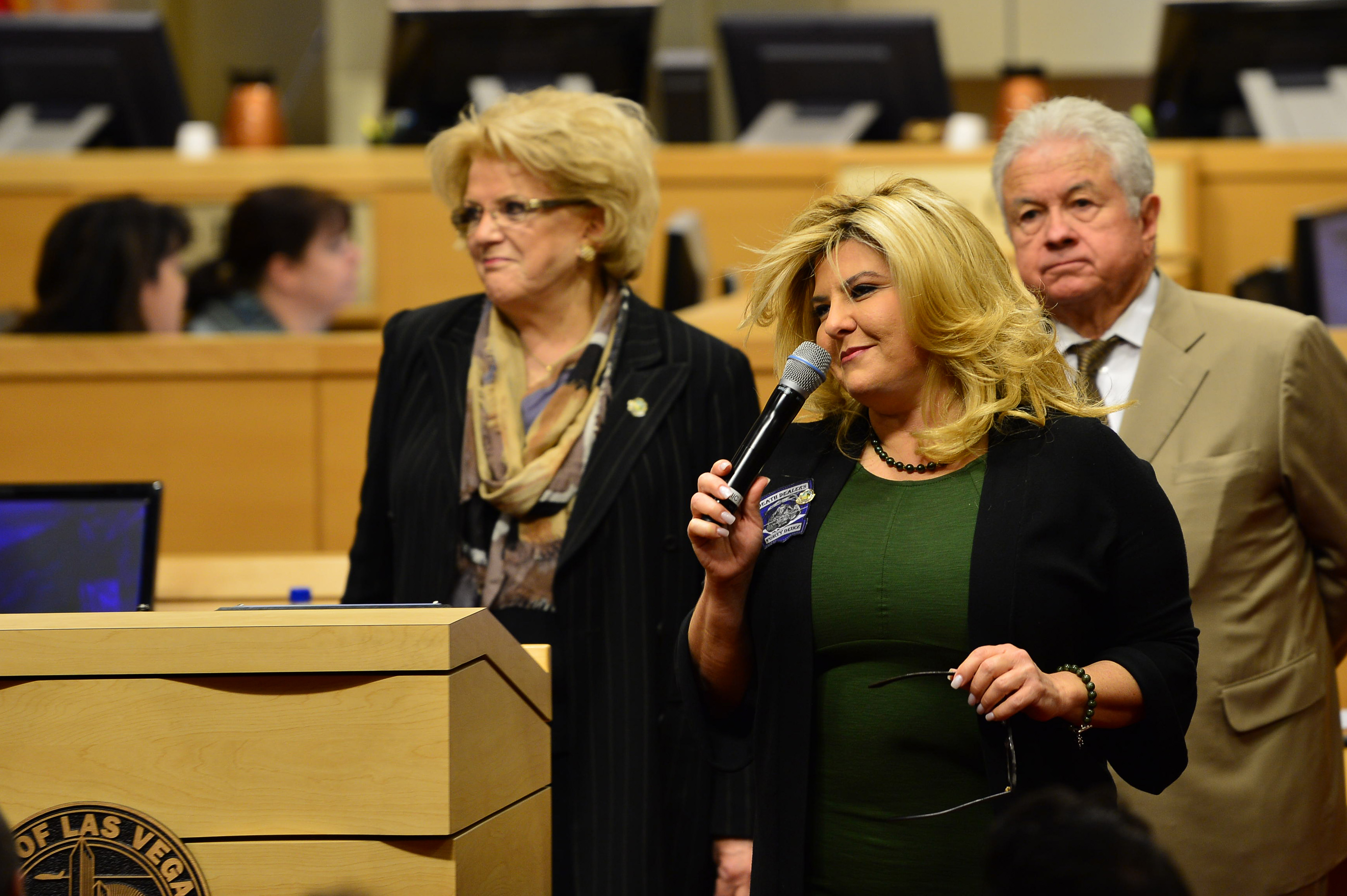
Fiore thanks the men and women of Creech Air Force Base in 2018

Fiore was elected to the Las Vegas City Council in 2017 and represented Ward 6. Fiore has been a high-profile supporter of Cliven Bundy and Donald Trump. Her support for Trump has resulted in the nickname "Lady Trump" being given to her in Nevada.

=== Blue Lives Matter March ===
After the unrest and riots resulting from the murder of George Floyd, conservative talk show host Wayne Allyn Root organized a Blue Lives Matter march on Las Vegas Blvd scheduled for June 13, 2020, of which Fiore was to be a co-host. A flyer was circulated with the Las Vegas Metropolitan Police Department's emblem displayed across the bottom. The next day, the City of Las Vegas issued a statement saying the event was not officially sanctioned. The Metropolitan Police Department issued a statement reading, "The Las Vegas Metropolitan Police Department recently learned of a planned rally for Blue Lives Matter that used images of our badge on their flyers. While we uphold the first amendment right for all groups to peacefully assemble, we did not authorize permission for the organizers to use the LVMPD badge as the department was not part of the planning of this event."

The event was postponed the next day and Las Vegas NAACP President Roxann McCoy said in a news release, "The NAACP Las Vegas is appalled that Las Vegas, Nevada City Council members Mayor Pro Tem Michelle Fiore, Councilwoman Victoria Seaman, Councilman Stavros Anthony do not care to understand Black citizens of Las Vegas and the injustices we constantly endure."

=== January 6 United States Capitol attack reaction ===
Days after the January 6 United States Capitol attack, Fiore attended the Republican National Committee's winter meeting on Amelia Island, Florida, where she told the New York Times, "I surely embrace President Trump."

=== Unsuccessful 2022 campaigns for statewide office ===
Fiore briefly ran in the Republican primary for the 2022 Nevada gubernatorial election before dropping out and winning the Republican nomination in the 2022 Nevada State Treasurer election, which she lost to Democratic nominee Zach Conine, 46.0% to 47.7%. She was the Republican National Committee committeewoman for Nevada from January 2021 to January 16, 2023, succeeded by Sigal Chattah.

Fiore left Las Vegas and moved to Nye County in November 2022 after narrowly losing the race for Nevada State Treasurer in the 2022 election.

== Nye County Justice of the Peace ==
In December 20, 2022, the Nye County Board of Commissioners appointed Fiore justice of the peace, preceded by Kent Jasperson. In June 2023, she was elected to the office.

== Charity fraud case ==
On July 12, 2024, a federal grand jury indicted Fiore on charges of defrauding donors to a charity to memorialize police officers who lost their lives in the line of duty. She is accused of soliciting tens of thousands of dollars for a statue honoring a fallen officer and instead using the money for personal expenses, including plastic surgery, rent, and her daughter's wedding. Fiore gave a statement to the media after the hearing in Las Vegas's federal courthouse. She was released on her own recognizance to await a trial scheduled to begin on September 24. She was also ordered to not have contact with any non-family-member witnesses outside the presence of legal counsel.

In October 2024, Fiore was convicted on six counts of wire fraud and one count of conspiracy to commit wire fraud. The jury returned the verdict almost immediately after it went into deliberation.

A sentencing hearing was scheduled for May 14, 2025, but President Donald Trump pardoned Fiore on April 24. Shortly after receiving the presidential pardon, Fiore filed a notice stating that she is appealing the decision to keep her suspended from her role as a Pahrump justice of the peace. In April 2026, the Nevada Supreme Court dismissed her appeals and upheld the state panel's decision of unpaid suspension.

== Elections ==
- 2010 Fiore first ran for Nevada's 1st congressional district in the June 8 eight-way Republican primary, but lost to perennial candidate Kenneth Wegner.
- 2012 When Republican Assemblyman Richard McArthur ran for Nevada Senate and left the Assembly District 4 seat open, Fiore was unopposed in the June 12 Republican primary and won the three-way November 6 general election with 14,239 votes (53.11%) against Democratic nominee Kenneth Evans and Independent American candidate Jonathan Hansen.
- 2014 Fiore, now an incumbent, faced her first reelection challenge from Democrat Jeff Hinton, a former U.S. Marine and current schoolteacher. Fiore won by nearly 25 percent.
- 2016 Fiore decided to give up her assembly seat and run for election in the open 3rd congressional district. She came in third behind perennial candidate and businessman Danny Tarkanian and state Senator Michael Roberson.
- 2017 With City Councilman Steve Ross retiring, Fiore ran for Ward 6 in northwestern Las Vegas, about half of which overlaps with her old assembly district. Though municipal elections in Nevada are nonpartisan, Fiore framed the contest as a referendum on political ideology in an area where Republicans outnumber Democrats. Fiore faced a crowded field, including the retiring councilman's wife, Kelli. Fiore led with 46% of the vote in the first round. In the second round, Fiore defeated Kelli Ross, 51%–49%. She was named mayor pro tem of the City Council on July 3, 2019.
- 2020 Fiore was reelected as Republican National Committeewoman in June by a vote of 220 to 27. The Clark County Republican Party released a statement criticizing the "racially charged" remarks she made at the group's June 6, 2020, convention. She stepped down as Las Vegas City Council Mayor Pro Tem on June 16 to focus on the country's racial divide.
- 2022 On October 19, 2021, Fiore announced her candidacy for governor of Nevada in the 2022 Nevada gubernatorial election. On March 17, 2022, she withdrew from the gubernatorial race to run for Nevada State Treasurer in the 2022 election. On November 8, 2022, Fiore lost the general election to incumbent Democrat Zach Conine.

== See also ==
- List of people granted executive clemency in the second Trump presidency
