= Victoria A. Dooling =

American politician

Member of the Nevada Assembly from the 41st district
- In office November 5, 2014 – November 9, 2016
- Preceded by: Paul Aizley
- Succeeded by: Sandra Jauregui

Personal details
- Born: 1944 (age 81–82) Houston, Texas, U.S.
- Party: Republican
- Spouse: Richard Dooling (deceased)
- Children: 2
- Education: William Howard Taft High School
- Alma mater: Los Angeles Pierce College

Victoria A. Dooling (born 1944) is an American politician. She served as a Republican member of the Nevada Assembly from 2014 until 2016.

== Early life ==
Victoria Dooling was born in 1944 in Houston, Texas. She attended William Howard Taft High School in Woodland Hills, California, near Los Angeles. She graduated from the Los Angeles Pierce College.

== Career ==
Dooling served as a Republican member of the Nevada Assembly, where she was elected in November 2014 to represent District 41, which includes Henderson, Nevada. In March 2015, she proposed a bill that would require that access to segregated public school bathrooms be limited on the basis of biological sex rather than gender identity. The bill, which was called by various sources "transphobic", and one that struck "the perfect balance", "a needed safety measure", was voted down by a bi-partisan majority.

Dooling chose not to run for reelection in 2016.

== Personal life ==
With her husband Richard, she had a son, Todd, and a daughter, Candace. Her husband died in 2015. She resides in Henderson, Nevada.
