= 2026 Nevada lieutenant gubernatorial election =

- November 3, 2026

Nominee	Sandra Jauregui	Stavros Anthony
Party	Democratic	Republican
Popular vote	555,522	421,541
Percentage	54.3%	41.2%
- Jauregui: 50–60% Anthony: 40–50% 50–60% 60–70% 70–80%
Lieutenant Governor before election
Stavros Anthony
Republican
Elected Lieutenant Governor
Sandra Jauregui
Democratic

The 2026 Nevada lieutenant gubernatorial election took place on November 3, 2026, to elect the lieutenant governor of Nevada. Incumbent Republican lieutenant governor Stavros Anthony lost re-election to a second term.

Primary elections took place on June 9, 2026. Anthony won the Republican nomination unopposed while majority leader of the Nevada Assembly Sandra Jauregui won the Democratic nomination with 59.8%.

== Republican primary ==
=== Candidates ===
==== Nominee ====
- Stavros Anthony, incumbent lieutenant governor (2023–present)

=== Endorsements ===
Stavros Anthony

Executive branch officials

- Donald Trump, president of the United States (2017–2021, 2025–present)

Party chapters

- Clark County Republican Party

Organizations

- Nevada Young Republicans

== Democratic primary ==
=== Candidates ===
==== Nominee ====
- Sandra Jauregui, majority leader of the Nevada Assembly (2023–present) from the 41st district (2016–present)

==== Eliminated in primary ====
- Courtney Burke, nurse practitioner
- BridgieNix Scheiner, entertainer

=== Endorsements ===
Sandra Jauregui

Executive branch officials

- Pete Buttigieg, former secretary of transportation (2021–2025)

U.S. senators

- Catherine Cortez Masto, Nevada (2017–present)
- Mark Kelly, Arizona (2020–present)
- Jacky Rosen, Nevada (2019–present)

U.S. representatives

- Steven Horsford, NV-04 (2013–2015, 2019–present)
- Susie Lee, NV-03 (2019–present)
- Dina Titus, NV-01 (2013–present)

Statewide officials

- Austin Davis, lieutenant governor of Pennsylvania (2023–present)
- Aaron Ford, attorney general of Nevada (2019–present)

Labor unions

- Professional Firefighters of Nevada
- Clark County Education Association
- Southern Nevada Building Trades Union

Organizations

- Brady Campaign
- EMILYs List
- End Citizens United
- Giffords
- Latino Victory Fund
- Reproductive Freedom for All
BridgieNix Scheiner

Labor unions

- International Alliance of Theatrical Stage Employees Local 363

=== Results ===
Primary results by county: Jauregui: 30–40%; 40–50%; 50–60%; 60–70%; Tie: 30–40%

Democratic primary results
Party	Candidate	Votes	%
Democratic	Sandra Jauregui	109,344	59.8
Democratic	Courtney Burke	38,091	20.8
Democratic	BridgieNix Scheiner	21,791	11.9
None of These Candidates		13,615	7.5
Total votes		182,841	100.0

== Independent and third party candidates ==
=== Candidates ===
==== Declared ====
- Janine Hansen, perennial candidate (Independent American Party)

==== Did not qualify for ballot ====
- Cornelius Jones, psychologist

== General election ==
=== Post-primary endorsements ===
Stavros Anthony (R)

Statewide officials

- Joe Lombardo, governor of Nevada (2023–present)

Newspapers

- Las Vegas Review-Journal
Sandra Jauregui (D)

Labor unions

- AFL-CIO
- International Brotherhood of Teamsters

Organizations

- Everytown for Gun Safety
- National Women's Political Caucus

Newspapers

- Las Vegas Sun

=== Polling ===
Poll source	Date(s) administered	Sample size (Note: Key: A – all adults RV – registered voters LV – likely voters V – unclear)	Margin of error	Stavros Anthony (R)	Sandra Jauregui (D)	Other	Undecided
Noble Predictive Insights	October 26–28, 2026	487 (LV)	± 4.4%	41%	48%	4% (Note: Janine Hansen (IA) with 3%; "Another candidate not listed" with 1%)	8%
Noble Predictive Insights	September 22–26, 2026	800 (RV)	± 3.5%	33%	38%	8% (Note: "Another candidate" and "None of these candidates" with 4%)	21%
Noble Predictive Insights	September 22–26, 2026	708 (LV)	± 3.7%	38%	41%	6% (Note: "Another candidate" and "None of these candidates" with 3%)	14%

=== Results ===
2026 Nevada lieutenant gubernatorial election
Party	Candidate	Votes	%	±%
Republican	Stavros Anthony (incumbent)			
Democratic	Sandra Jauregui			
Independent American	Janine Hansen			
None of These Candidates				
Total votes			100.0	
Democratic gain from Republican				

== See also ==
- 2026 United States lieutenant gubernatorial elections
