= Nevada's 20th Senate district =

American legislative district

Nevada's 20th State Senate district
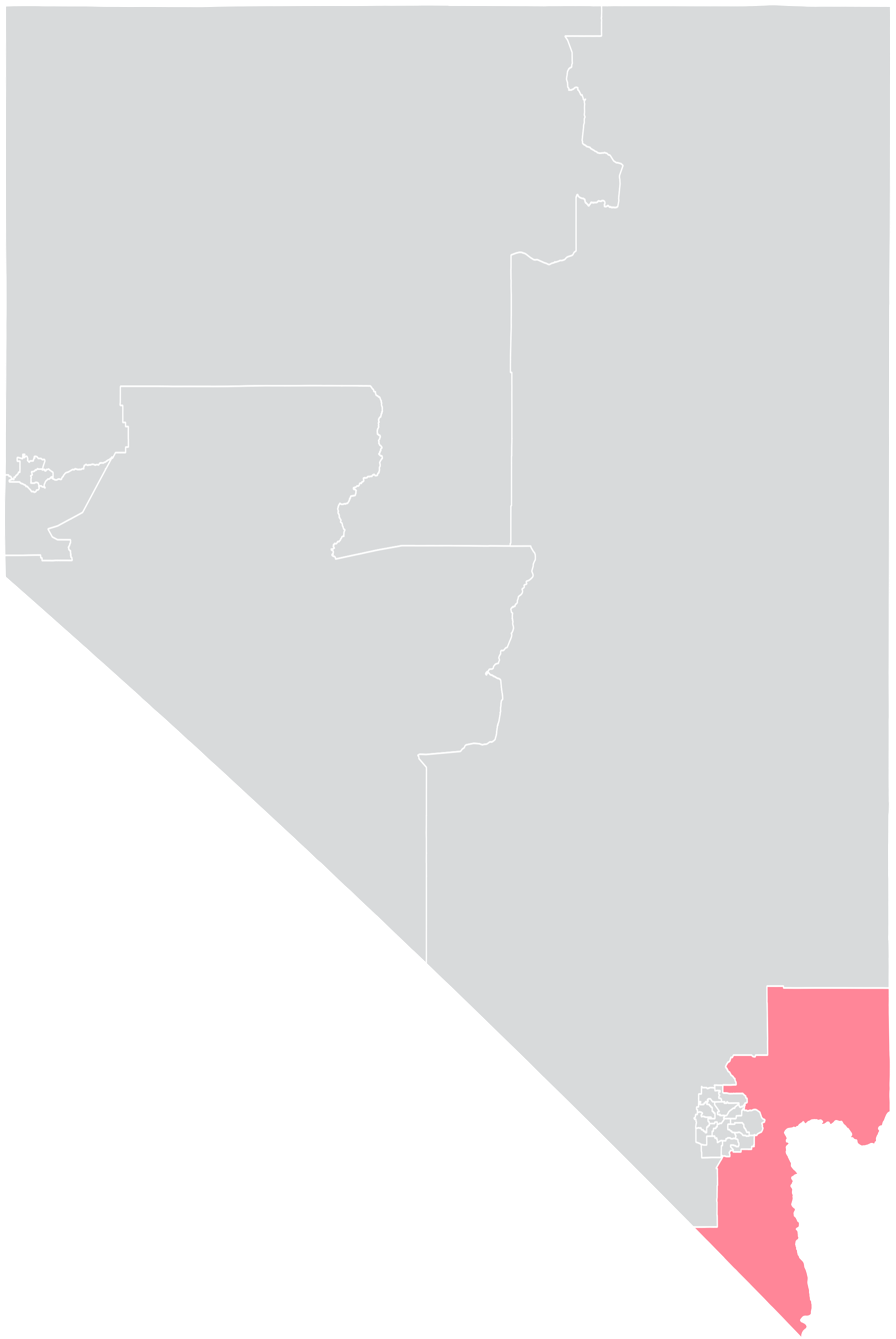
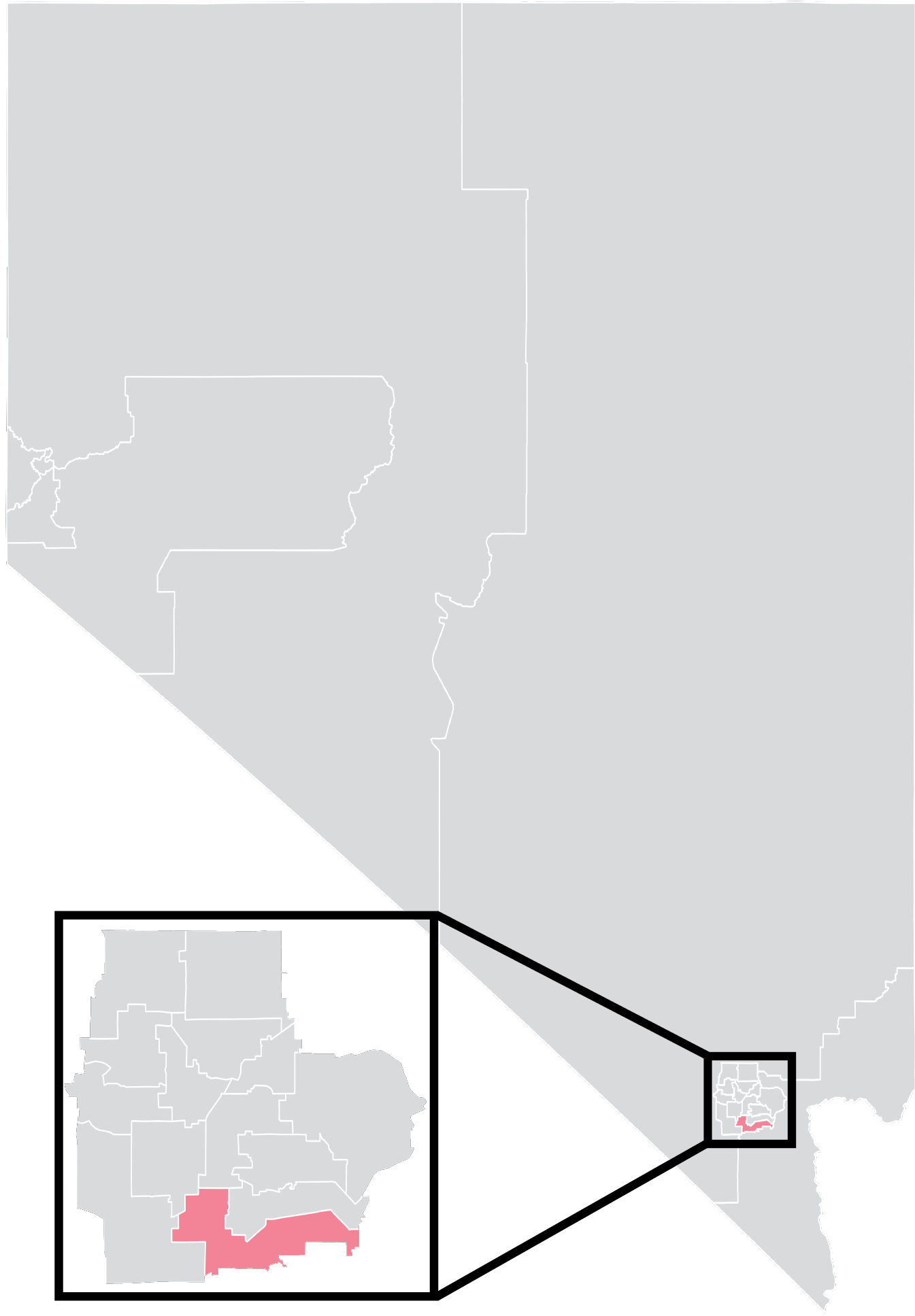
Senator
Jeff Stone; R–Las Vegas
- Registration: 39.0% Democratic; 38.5% Republican; 16.9% No party preference
- Demographics: 57% White; 7% Black; 16% Hispanic; 14% Asian; 1% Hawaiian/Pacific Islander; 4% Other
- Population (2018): 155,123
- Registered voters: 70,812

Nevada's 20th Senate district is one of 21 districts in the Nevada Senate. It has been represented by Republican Jeff Stone since 2022, succeeding fellow Republican Keith Pickard.

== Geography ==
District 20 covers the southern edge of the Las Vegas Valley in Clark County, including parts of Henderson, Paradise, and Enterprise.

The district is located entirely within Nevada's 3rd congressional district, and overlaps with the 22nd and 41st districts of the Nevada Assembly.

== Recent election results ==
Nevada Senators are elected to staggered four-year terms; since 2012 redistricting, the 20th district has held elections in midterm years.

=== 2022 ===
2022 Nevada State Senate election, District 20
Party	Candidate	Votes	%
Republican	Jeff Stone	44,567	61.7
Democratic	Brent Foutz	25,712	35.6
Libertarian	Brandon Mills	1,968	2.7
Total votes		72,247	100
Republican hold			

== Historical election results ==
=== 2018 ===
2018 Nevada State Senate election, District 20
Primary election
Party	Candidate	Votes	%
Republican	Keith Pickard	3,696	58.9
Republican	Byron Brooks	2,575	41.1
Total votes		6,271	100
Democratic	Julie Pazina	5,014	72.8
Democratic	Paul Aizley	1,871	27.2
Total votes		6,885	100
General election
Republican	Keith Pickard	27,162	49.05
Democratic	Julie Pazina	27,138	49.01
Libertarian	Richard Bronstein	1,078	1.95
Total votes		55,378	100
Republican hold			

=== 2014 ===
2014 Nevada State Senate election, District 20
Primary election
Party	Candidate	Votes	%
Republican	Michael Roberson (incumbent)	3,009	58.5
Republican	Carl Bunce	2,131	41.5
Total votes		5,140	100
General election
Republican	Michael Roberson (incumbent)	16,715	60.4
Democratic	Teresa Lowry	10,959	39.6
Total votes		27,674	100
Republican hold			

=== Federal and statewide results ===
Year	Office	Results
2020	President	Trump 49.6 – 48.5%
2018	Senate	Rosen 49.8 – 46.7%
2018	Governor	Sisolak 49.6 – 46.3%
2016	President	Trump 48.0 – 46.1%
2012	President	Romney 50.0 – 48.4%
2012	Senate	Heller 49.4 – 42.1%
