= Lisa Cano Burkhead =

American politician

36th Lieutenant Governor of Nevada
- In office December 16, 2021 – January 2, 2023
- Governor: Steve Sisolak
- Preceded by: Kate Marshall
- Succeeded by: Stavros Anthony

Personal details
- Born: 1970 or 1971 (age 54–55) Las Vegas, Nevada, U.S.
- Party: Democratic
- Spouse: Jeffrey Burkhead
- Children: 3
- Education: University of Redlands (BA)

Lisa Cano Burkhead (born 1970/1971) is an American educator and politician who served as the 36th lieutenant governor of Nevada from 2021 to 2023. She was nominated by Governor Steve Sisolak to replace Kate Marshall in December 2021. Prior to serving as lieutenant governor, Cano Burkhead was a teacher and principal in Clark County, Nevada schools. She ran for a full term but was defeated by Stavros Anthony, a member of the Las Vegas city council.

== Early life and education ==
Cano Burkhead was born in Las Vegas, Nevada. Her father was from Argentina and her mother was from Paraguay. She received her teaching degree and a dual degree in Spanish and English from the University of Redlands.

== Career ==
Cano Burkhead worked as an educator since 1996, when she began as a Spanish and English teacher in Clark County. She was the dean of students and assistant principal at Eldorado High School. She was chief of staff to Richard A. Carranza, Nevada's northwest region superintendent before becoming principal of Fertitta Middle School from 2010 until 2015. Cano Burkhead then was principal of Foothill High School from 2015 until her retirement in July 2021.

In 2008, she was honored with the Nevada Association of Student Councils' Administrator of the Year Award.

=== Early political career ===
Cano Burkhead ran unsuccessfully for the Nevada Assembly in the 2002 election cycle. She also served as a member of the Paradise, Nevada Town Board.

=== Lieutenant governor of Nevada ===
On December 16, 2021, Governor Steve Sisolak named Cano Burkhead as the state's lieutenant governor, following the resignation of Kate Marshall in September. Cano Burkhead was sworn into the position shortly after the Sisolak's announcement, and she also announced her intentions to run for a full term in the 2022 lieutenant gubernatorial election. She delivered her ceremonial remarks in English and Spanish.

Cano Burkhead said that two of her main focuses as lieutenant governor were salaries for state educators and providing sufficient supplies for schools.

== Electoral history ==
Nevada Assembly District 21 election, 2002
Party	Candidate	Votes	%
Republican	Walter Andonov	7,598	54.72
Democratic	Lisa Cano	5,961	42.93
American Independent Party	Joshua Hansen	327	2.35
Total votes		13,886	100.00

Nevada lieutenant gubernatorial election, 2022
Party	Candidate	Votes	%
Republican	Stavros Anthony	492,300	49.5
Democratic	Lisa Cano Burkhead	454,739	45.7
None of These Candidates		20,654	2.1
Libertarian	Javi Tachiquin	11,111	1.1
Total votes		994,716	100.0
Republican gain from Democratic			

== Personal life ==
Cano Burkhead was briefly married to Mario Sanchez, a Las Vegas business owner. She is now married to Jeffrey Burkhead and they have three daughters. They live in Henderson, Nevada.

== See also ==
- List of minority governors and lieutenant governors in the United States

Party political offices
Preceded by Kate Marshall	Democratic nominee for Lieutenant Governor of Nevada; 2022	Succeeded by Sandra Jauregui
Political offices
Preceded by Kate Marshall	Lieutenant Governor of Nevada; 2021–2023	Succeeded by Stavros Anthony
