= Kelly Kite =

American politician

Member of the Nevada Assembly from the 39th district
- In office 2010–2012

Personal details
- Born: 1947 (age 78–79)
- Party: Republican

Kelly Kite (born 1947) is an American Republican politician who represented District 39 in the Nevada Assembly from 2010 to 2012.

Kite endorsed Ron DeSantis in the 2024 Republican Party presidential primaries.
