= Lynn D. Stewart (politician) =

American politician (born 1941)

Member of the Nevada Assembly from the 22nd district
- In office 2006–2016
- Succeeded by: Keith Pickard

Personal details
- Born: 1941 (age 84–85) Salt Lake City, Utah
- Party: Republican
- Domestic partner: Dianne Stewart
- Occupation: Retired High School Teacher

Lynn D. Stewart (born 1941) is an American politician and a former Republican member of the Nevada Assembly from February 2006 to 2016, representing District 22 in Clark County. 2015 Session. Lynn Stewart was Chairman of the Legislative Operations and Elections Committee. His vote in favor of the controversial Governor's Budget (which included a "Margin Tax")was not the cause of his not running for reelection. He did not run for reelection in 2016 because of poor eyesight caused by Macular Degeneration.
