= Jeff Stone (California and Nevada politician) =

American politician

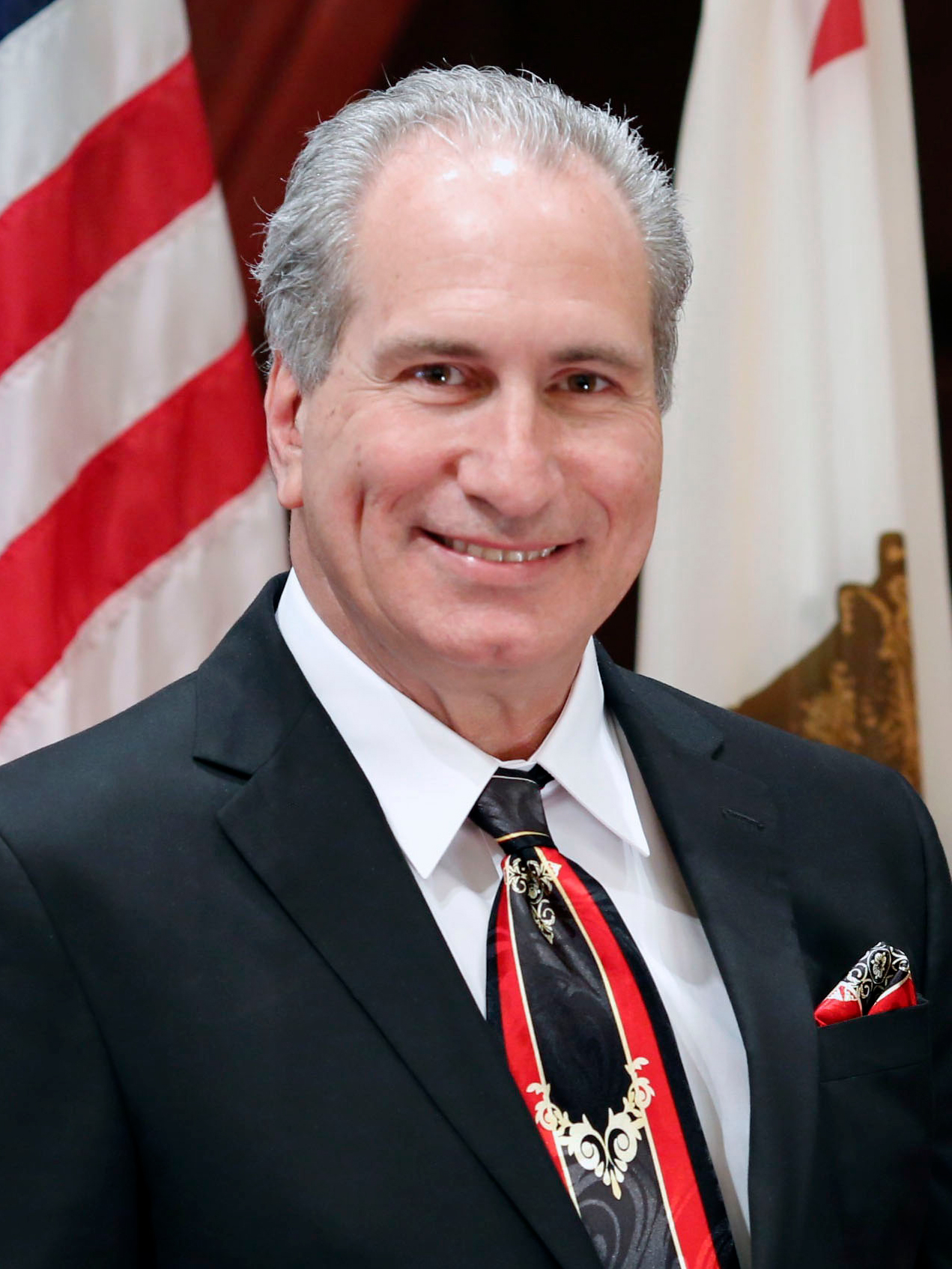
- Official portrait, 2015

Member of the Nevada Senate from the 20th district
- Incumbent
- Assumed office November 9, 2022
- Preceded by: Joe Hardy (Redistricting)

Western Regional Director of the U.S. Department of Labor
- In office November 1, 2019 – January 20, 2021
- President: Donald Trump
- Secretary: Eugene Scalia

Member of the California State Senate from the 28th district
- In office December 1, 2014 – November 1, 2019
- Preceded by: Ted Lieu
- Succeeded by: Melissa Melendez

Member of the Riverside County Board of Supervisors from the 3rd District
- In office 2004–2014
- Succeeded by: Chuck Washington

Personal details
- Born: Jeffrey Earle Stone; January 30, 1956 (age 70) Los Angeles, California, U.S.
- Party: Republican
- Education: University of California, Irvine; University of California, Los Angeles; University of Southern California (PharmD)
- Occupation: Politician
- Profession: Pharmacist

Jeffrey Earle Stone (born January 30, 1956) is an American politician and pharmacist, currently serving as a member of the Nevada State Senate since 2022. A member of the Republican Party, Stone represented California's 28th State Senatorial district in the California State Senate, which encompassed parts of Riverside County at the time. Prior to his 2014 election to the California State Senate, he was a Riverside County Supervisor. Stone stepped down from the California State Senate in 2019 after being nominated Western Regional Director of the United States Department of Labor by President Donald Trump. After his federal position ended in 2021, he became a full-time resident of Nevada and now represents the Nevada's 20th Senate district.

== Early life and education ==
Stone was born and raised in Los Angeles County, California. He attended the University of California, Irvine, from 1975 to 1976 and the University of California, Los Angeles, in 1977. He earned a Doctor of Pharmacy degree from the USC School of Pharmacy.

== Career ==
After earning his pharmacy degree, Stone relocated to Temecula, California and opened a small business. He served as a member of the Temecula City Council before being elected to the Riverside County Board of Supervisors.

In the 2014 general election, he defeated former Assemblywoman Bonnie Garcia, another Republican. Stone is Jewish. He was a member of the California Legislative Jewish Caucus, until he resigned the caucus in August 2017, the same day the Jewish Caucus released a statement condemning President Trump's response to the white supremacist Unite the Right rally in Charlottesville. In his resignation statement, he said that the caucus was preoccupied with criticizing President Donald Trump. He was the only Republican on the caucus at the time of his resignation (Note: Prior to 2017, Eric Linder was a fellow Republican member of the caucus.)

In 2016, Stone was the Republican nominee for California's 36th congressional district, but he lost the general election to Raul Ruiz by a wide margin. He was narrowly re-elected to the Senate in 2018. He resigned on November 1, 2019, after accepting an appointment with the U.S. Department of Labor to become its Western Regional Director. After a special election held on May 13, 2020, Stone was succeeded in the State Senate by Republican Assemblywoman, Melissa Melendez. Stone's time at the Department of Labor ended on January 20, 2021.

Stone had previously purchased a home in Henderson, Nevada. In 2022, he announced his candidacy for Nevada's 20th state Senate district. Following his successful election, Stone became a Nevada senator in November 2022 for a district encompassing the southeastern corner of the state.
