= Keith Pickard =

Republican member of the Nevada Senate

Member of the Nevada Senate from the 20th district
- In office November 9, 2018 – November 9, 2022
- Preceded by: Michael Roberson
- Succeeded by: Julie Pazina (Redistricting)

Member of the Nevada Assembly from the 22nd district
- In office 2016–2018
- Preceded by: Lynn Stewart
- Succeeded by: Melissa Hardy

Personal details
- Born: 1962 (age 63–64) Long Beach, California
- Party: Republican
- Spouse: Margaret Pickard
- Children: 7

Keith Pickard (born 1962) is a former Republican member of the Nevada Senate. He represented the 20th district, which covers parts of the southern Las Vegas Valley. Pickard formerly represented the 22nd district in the Nevada Assembly.

== Biography ==
Keith Pickard was born in Long Beach, California, in 1962, moving to Portland, Oregon, at the age of five. He graduated from Brigham Young University in 1990 and received his Juris Doctor from the William S. Boyd School of Law in 2011.

Pickard ran for the Assembly in 2016, defeating Richard Bunce in the Republican primary and Luis Aguirre-Insua in the general election.

Pickard ran for the Nevada Senate in 2018, for the seat being vacated by state Senate Minority Leader Michael Roberson, defeating Byron Brooks in the Republican primary and Julie Pazina in the General Election.

== Electoral history ==
Nevada Assembly District 22 Republican primary, 2016
Party	Candidate	Votes	%
Republican	Keith Pickard	1,970	55.6%
Republican	Richard Bunce	1,574	44.4%
Total votes		3,544	100.0%

Nevada Assembly District 22 election, 2016
Party	Candidate	Votes	%
Republican	Keith Pickard	19,433	58.5%
Democratic	Luis Aguirre-Insua	13,770	41.5%
Total votes		33,203	100.0%

Nevada Senate District 20 Republican primary, 2018
Party	Candidate	Votes	%
Republican	Keith Pickard	3,696	58.9%
Republican	Byron Brooks	2,575	41.1%
Total votes		6,271	100.0%

Nevada Senate District 22 election, 2018
Party	Candidate	Votes	%
Republican	Keith Pickard	27,162	49.05%
Democratic	Julie Pazina	27,138	49.01%
Libertarian	Richard "Rick" Bronstien	1,078	1.95%
Total votes		55,378	100.0%
