= Paul Aizley =

American politician (1936–2023)

Member of the Nevada Assembly from the 41st district
- In office February 2, 2009 – November 5, 2014
- Preceded by: David Parks
- Succeeded by: Victoria A. Dooling

Personal details
- Born: February 16, 1936 Boston, Massachusetts, U.S.
- Died: April 16, 2023 (aged 87) Las Vegas, Nevada, U.S.
- Party: Democratic
- Education: University of Washington; Harvard University; University of Arizona; Arizona State University
- Website: paulaizley.com

Paul Aizley (/ˈeɪzli/; February 16, 1936 – April 16, 2023) was an American politician who represented District 41 in the Nevada Assembly for three terms, from 2009 to 2014. Aizley was the Assembly's speaker pro tempore during his third term, from 2013 to 2014.

== Education ==
Aizley attended the University of Washington, earned his BA from Harvard University, his MS from the University of Arizona, and his PhD from Arizona State University.

== Elections ==
- 2008: When Democratic Assemblyman David Parks ran for Nevada Senate and left the House District 41 seat open, Aizley won the three-way August 12 Democratic Primary with 723 votes (71.44%), and won the three-way November 4 General election with 7,675 votes (62.21%) against Republican nominee Tim Rowland and Independent American candidate Kenneth Rex.
- 2010: Aizley was unopposed for the June 8 Democratic Primary and won the November 2 General election with 4,950 votes (56.69%) against Republican nominee Jan Porter.
- 2012: Aizley was unopposed for the June 12 Democratic Primary and won the November 6 General election with 11,680 votes (54.19%) against Republican nominee Phil Regeski.
- 2014: Aizley was defeated for reelection to the Assembly by Republican Victoria A. Dooling by a vote of 5,829 (55.72%) to 4,632 (44.28%).
- 2016: Aizley is running for reelection to the Assembly from District 41.
