= Stavros Anthony =

American politician (born 1957)

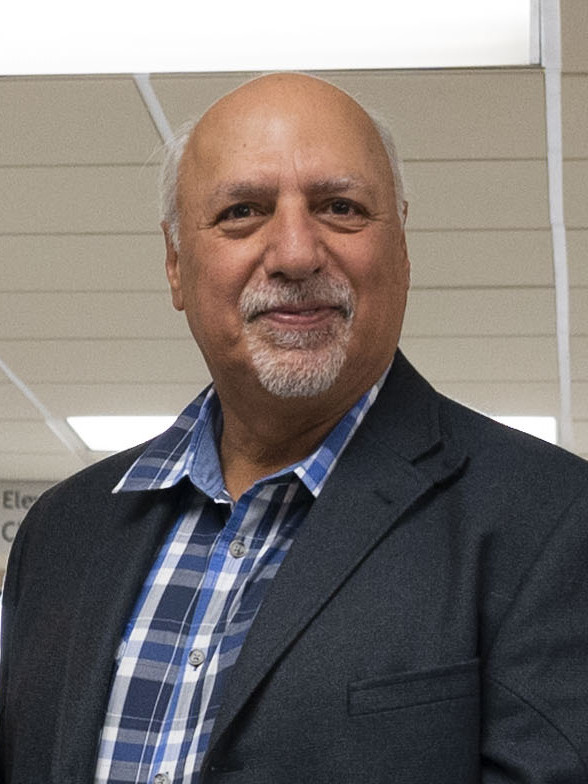
- Anthony in 2023

37th Lieutenant Governor of Nevada
- Incumbent
- Assumed office January 2, 2023
- Governor: Joe Lombardo
- Preceded by: Lisa Cano Burkhead

Mayor pro tempore of Las Vegas
- In office June 16, 2020 – December 7, 2022
- Preceded by: Michele Fiore
- Succeeded by: Brian Knudsen

Member of the Las Vegas City Council from Ward 4
- In office July 1, 2009 – December 7, 2022
- Preceded by: David Steinman
- Succeeded by: Francis Allen-Palenske

Personal details
- Born: Stavros Steve Anthony; January 13, 1957 (age 69) St. Clair Shores, Michigan, U.S.
- Party: Republican
- Children: 2
- Education: Wayne State University (B.A.); University of Nevada, Las Vegas (M.A., PhD)
- Website: www.stavrosfornevada.com

Stavros Steve Anthony (born January 13, 1957) is an American politician and retired law enforcement officer who is the 37th lieutenant governor of Nevada, since 2023. A member of the Republican Party, Anthony won the 2022 Nevada lieutenant governor election, defeating incumbent Democrat Lisa Cano Burkhead. He lost re-election in 2026 to Democrat Sandra Jauregui. He previously served as Member of the Las Vegas City Council from 2009 to December 2022, and unsuccessfully ran for mayor of Las Vegas in 2015.

== Early life and education ==
Stavros Anthony was born on January 13, 1957 in St. Clair Shores, Michigan. He is a Greek Cypriot-American whose parents came to the United States from Cyprus in the 1950s.

Anthony graduated with a bachelor of arts in Criminal Justice from Wayne State University in 1980. In 1987, Anthony graduated with a Master of Arts in Political Science from the University of Nevada Las Vegas. In 1999, he received his Ph.D. in Sociology from University of Nevada Las Vegas. He has also attended the University of Louisville and the FBI National Academy in Quantico, Virginia.

In 1980, Anthony joined the Las Vegas Metropolitan Police Department. He served for 29 years, and rose through the ranks to captain in charge of the Financial and Property Crimes Bureau. As one of the department's senior leaders, Anthony's additional assignments included head of the Vice/Narcotics Bureau, the Northeast Area Command, and the Transportation Safety Bureau.

== Las Vegas City Council ==
A member of the Republican Party, Anthony served as Member of Las Vegas City Council from 2009 to December 2022. He was appointed Mayor Pro Tem of Las Vegas by Mayor Carolyn Goodman, and first served in that capacity from July 2011 to April 2015. He was re-appointed June 8, 2020. Anthony ran unsuccessfully against Goodman in the 2015 Las Vegas mayoral election.

== Lieutenant governor ==
Anthony won the 2022 Nevada lieutenant governor election, defeating incumbent Democrat Lisa Cano Burkhead.

Anthony is currently the treasurer of the National Lieutenant Governors Association.

== Personal life ==
Anthony is of Greek descent and grew up a member of the Greek Orthodox Church. Anthony was a past member and president of the board of directors for St. John Greek Orthodox Church at Las Vegas. He has been married for 41 years. He also has two daughters who are both graduates of the University of Nevada, Reno.

Political offices
Preceded by Lisa Cano Burkhead	Lieutenant Governor of Nevada; 2023–present	Incumbent
