= Michael Roberson =

Minority Leader of the Nevada Senate

Minority Leader of the Nevada Senate
- In office November 9, 2016 – November 7, 2018
- Preceded by: Aaron Ford
- Succeeded by: James Settelmeyer
- In office February 4, 2013 – November 5, 2014
- Preceded by: Mike McGinness
- Succeeded by: Aaron Ford

Majority Leader of the Nevada Senate
- In office November 5, 2014 – November 9, 2016
- Preceded by: Mo Denis
- Succeeded by: Aaron Ford

Member of the Nevada Senate from the 20th district
- In office December 8, 2011 – November 9, 2018
- Preceded by: Constituency established
- Succeeded by: Keith Pickard

Member of the Nevada Senate from the 5th district
- In office November 3, 2010 – December 7, 2011 Serving with Shirley Breeden
- Preceded by: Joyce Woodhouse
- Succeeded by: Constituency abolished

Personal details
- Born: Michael Craig Roberson; June 20, 1970 (age 56) Webb City, Missouri, U.S.
- Party: Republican
- Spouse: Liberty Leavitt (m. 2008)
- Education: University of Kansas, Lawrence (BA, JD)
- Website: Campaign website

Michael Craig Roberson is an American attorney and politician who served in the Nevada Senate from 2010 until 2018, representing the 20th district. A Republican, Roberson was Senate Majority Leader from 2014 until 2016, and Senate Minority Leader from 2013 to 2014 and again from 2016 to 2018. He is responsible for passing the largest tax increase in Nevada's history, the 2015 Commerce Tax.

On August 21, 2017, Roberson announced that he would run for Lieutenant Governor of Nevada; the incumbent, Mark Hutchison, announced that he would not be seeking a second term in the 2018 election. After winning the Republican nomination, Roberson lost in the general election to the Democratic candidate, Kate Marshall.

Nevada Senate
Preceded by Mike McGinness	Minority Leader of the Nevada Senate; 2013–2014	Succeeded by Aaron Ford
Preceded by Aaron Ford	Majority Leader of the Nevada Senate; 2014–2016	Succeeded by Aaron Ford
Preceded by Aaron Ford	Minority Leader of the Nevada Senate; 2016–2018	Succeeded by James Settelmeyer
Party political offices
Preceded by Mark Hutchison	Republican nominee for Lieutenant Governor of Nevada; 2018	Succeeded by Stavros Anthony
