= Steve Sisolak =

Governor of Nevada from 2019 to 2023

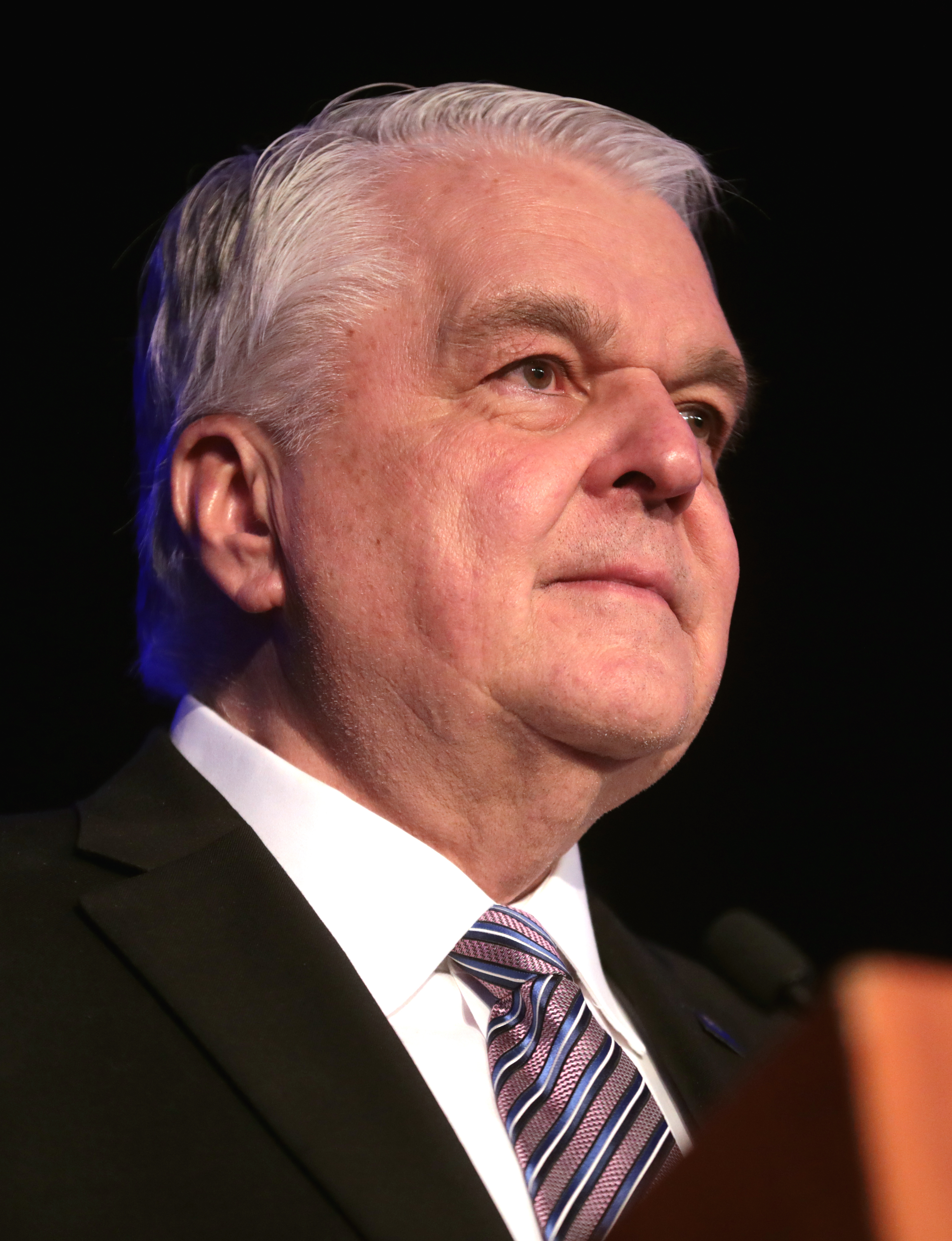
- Sisolak in 2020

30th Governor of Nevada
- In office January 7, 2019 – January 2, 2023
- Lieutenant: Kate Marshall; Lisa Cano Burkhead
- Preceded by: Brian Sandoval
- Succeeded by: Joe Lombardo

Chair of the Clark County Commission
- In office January 7, 2013 – January 7, 2019
- Preceded by: Susan Brager
- Succeeded by: Marilyn Kirkpatrick

Vice Chair of the Clark County Commission
- In office January 3, 2011 – January 6, 2013
- Preceded by: Susan Brager
- Succeeded by: Larry Brown

Member of the Clark County Commission from District A
- In office January 5, 2009 – January 7, 2019
- Preceded by: Bruce Woodbury
- Succeeded by: Michael Naft

Member of the Nevada Board of Regents from the 2nd district
- In office January 1, 1999 – December 31, 2008
- Preceded by: Maddy Graves
- Succeeded by: Theresa Malone
- Constituency: Subdistrict G

Personal details
- Born: December 26, 1953 (age 72) Milwaukee, Wisconsin, U.S.
- Party: Democratic
- Spouse(s): Dallas Garland (m. 1987; div. 2000) Kathy Ong (m. 2018)
- Children: 2
- Education: University of Wisconsin, Milwaukee (BS); University of Nevada, Las Vegas (MBA)

Stephen F. Sisolak (/sɪsəlæk/ SISS-əl-ack; born December 26, 1953) is an American businessman and politician who served as the 30th governor of Nevada from 2019 to 2023. A member of the Democratic Party, he served on the Clark County Commission from 2009 to 2019 and on the Nevada Board of Regents from 1999 to 2008. Sisolak was the only Democrat to be elected Governor in the 21st century until 2026.

Born in Milwaukee, Wisconsin, Sisolak graduated from the University of Wisconsin–Milwaukee and the University of Nevada, Las Vegas Business School. After becoming involved in several civic causes and government projects, he was elected to the Nevada Board of Regents and served from 1999 to 2008. In 2008, he was elected to the Clark County Commission and was reelected in 2012 and 2016. Sisolak served as vice chair of the commission from 2011 to 2013 and as chair from 2013 to 2019.

Sisolak ran for governor of Nevada in 2018. He defeated fellow Clark County commissioner Chris Giunchigliani for the Democratic nomination and then defeated the Republican nominee, attorney general Adam Laxalt, in the general election, becoming the first Democrat to serve as governor of Nevada since Bob Miller left office in 1999. He ran for reelection in 2022, losing to Republican nominee Joe Lombardo in a close race.

== Early life ==
Sisolak was born in Milwaukee, Wisconsin, on December 26, 1953. He is the son of Mary and Edward Frank Sisolak (1925-2004). His father was a design engineer for General Motors, and his mother worked at a convenience store. He is of Slovak and Czech descent. His grandfather Vendelín Šisolák (1899-1959) was from Lakšárska Nová Ves.

Sisolak grew up in Wauwatosa, Wisconsin, and graduated from Wauwatosa West High School in 1972. His first job was as a caddie at Tripoli Country Club at age 13. He was active on the student council and played basketball. He earned a bachelor of science in business from the University of Wisconsin–Milwaukee in 1974. He moved to Nevada shortly thereafter and earned a master of business administration from the University of Nevada, Las Vegas in 1978.

== Business career ==
Sisolak was a partner in the American Distributing Company, a telemarketing venture that sells coffee cups, pens, and various other promotional items to businesses. He also held a partnership in a second company, Associated Industries.

== Early political career ==
=== State Senate candidacy ===
Sisolak ran for the Nevada Senate in the Las Vegas-based 5th district in 1996, losing to Republican incumbent Ann O'Connell.

=== Nevada Board of Regents ===
Sisolak was first elected to the Nevada Board of Regents in 1998. During his time on the Board of Regents, Sisolak discovered that thousands of Nevada students had been wrongly charged out-of-state tuition and won refunds for them.

In 2002, Sisolak sided with students and voted against a 16% tuition increase. He voted against student fee hikes in 2003 and 2008.

In 2004, Sisolak opposed dropping "Reno" from the University of Nevada, Reno's name and supported a uniform marketing of the institution that includes "Reno", saying that without it "the institution was presenting itself as somehow better or more important than its Southern counterpart, the University of Nevada, Las Vegas."

Sisolak fought to bring back a popular apprenticeship program at the College of Southern Nevada that was abruptly canceled during the recession.

=== Clark County Commission ===
==== Elections ====
Sisolak was elected to the Clark County Commission in 2008 in a close race to replace outgoing commissioner Bruce Woodbury.

Sisolak was elected to a second term as a county commissioner in 2012, receiving the endorsement of the Las Vegas Review Journal and Las Vegas Sun.

Sisolak was elected to his third and final term as a county commissioner in 2016.

==== Tenure ====
Sisolak was sworn in as the Clark County commissioner on January 5, 2009. He represented District A on the commission. Sisolak served as vice chair of the commission from 2011 to 2013 and chaired the commission from 2013 to 2019. He resigned as a county commissioner on January 7, 2019, the day he was sworn in as governor, in order to appoint his successor.

Sisolak was "vehemently opposed to raising property taxes" and property tax rates remained flat during his entire tenure on the commission.

Sisolak voted against increasing the county gas tax in 2013.

Sisolak won praise from the conservative Nevada Policy Research Institute for fighting against waste, fraud, and abuse. A spokesperson for the institute said, "His efforts to hold government accountable, especially the firefighters, and look closely at how tax money is being spent should be applauded." Sisolak successfully pushed the Water District to terminate a contract with Wolfgang Puck that was costing taxpayers $600,000 per year. During the recession, Sisolak was a vocal critic of overtime and sick leave abuse, and his efforts resulted in over $7 million in reduced overtime costs and $30 million in reduced disability costs.

Sisolak successfully fought to cut Clark County Commissioners' pay.

Sisolak voted to refund $4.1 million to 1,600 Laughlin property owners who had been overcharged assessment fees.

Sisolak supported the "More Cops" initiative, which added 720 new officers to the Las Vegas Metropolitan Police Department, and Republican Sheriff Joe Lombardo said that these additional police officers helped reduce violent crime 7% in 2018.

Under Sisolak's chairmanship, Clark County opened The Harbor, an innovative juvenile justice resources center that operates 24 hours a day, seven days a week, and has prevented 3,000 youths from entering the criminal justice system.

Sisolak supported bringing the Golden Knights and Raiders to Las Vegas. According to the Las Vegas Review-Journal, he was the "driving force" behind getting the Raiders to come to Las Vegas.

In addition to the county commission, Sisolak's other government involvement includes vice president and board of directors member for the Las Vegas Valley Water District and board of directors member for the Southern Nevada Water Authority. He has also served as a member of the Colorado River Commission of Nevada, and vice chair of the board of commissioners for the University Medical Center Of Southern Nevada.

Sisolak is involved with many civic, charitable and business organizations, including the Henderson Chamber of Commerce, the American Red Cross-Clark County Chapter, the UNLV Alumni Association, Seniors United, American Red Cross Leadership Council, Las Vegas Chamber of Commerce, Las Vegas Better Business Bureau, the Boys & Girls Club, Hispanics in Politics, St. Joseph Husband of Mary Catholic Church, and the Nevada Partnership for Homeless Youth.

== Governor of Nevada ==
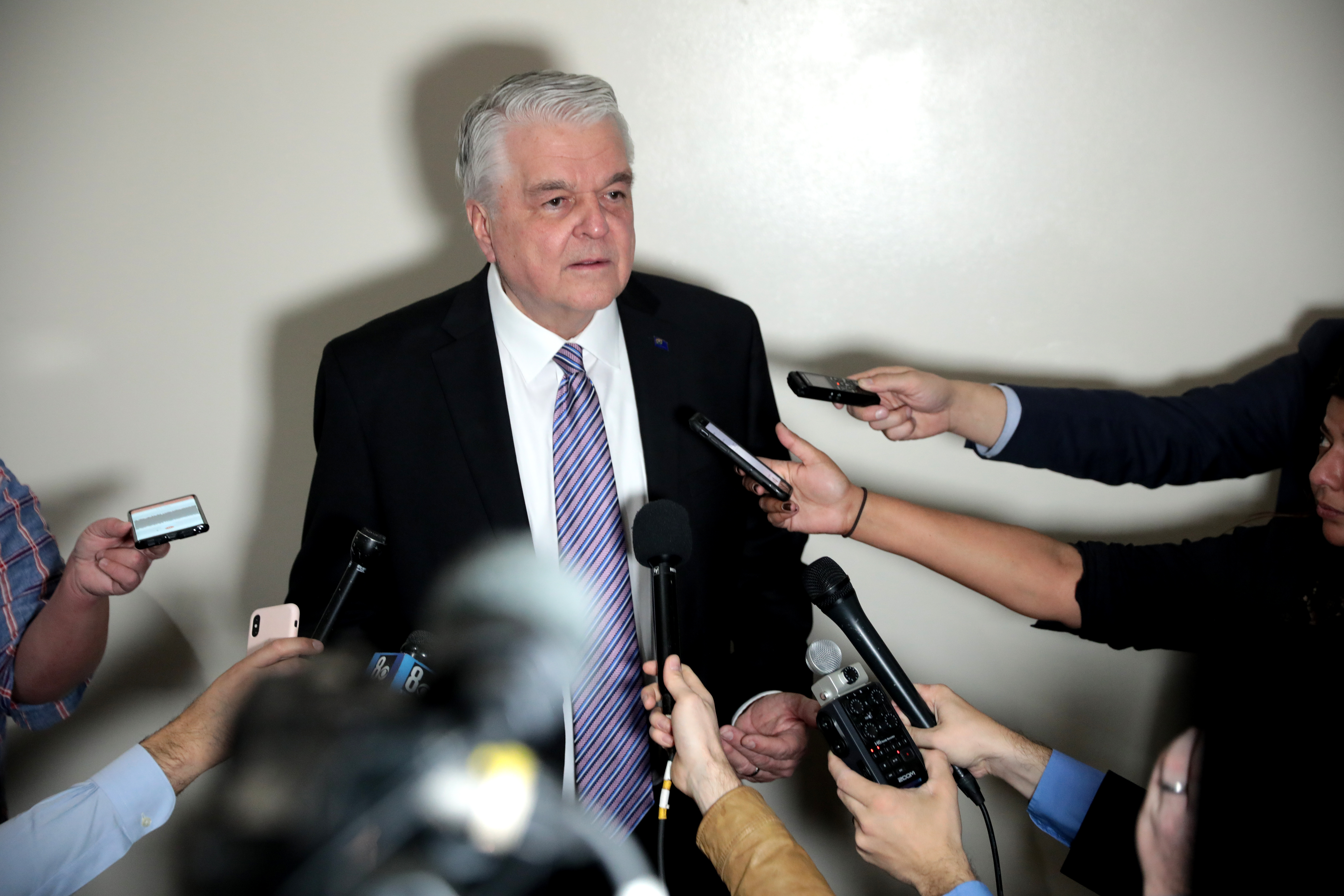
Sisolak speaking to the media prior to the 2020 Nevada caucuses

=== 2018 election bid ===
Sisolak was long considered a potential candidate for governor of Nevada in the 2018 election. He first considered running for governor in 2014, but declined in February 2014.

Sisolak officially announced his candidacy on June 22, 2017. He defeated Clark County Commission colleague Chris Giunchigliani on June 12, 2018, to become the Democratic nominee. The Republican nominee was Adam Laxalt, the attorney general of Nevada and the grandson of former U.S. senator Paul Laxalt.

Sisolak's campaign priorities were education, healthcare, and the economy. He released a healthcare policy platform that included proposals to reduce pharmaceutical drug prices, fix Nevada's doctor shortage, and protect Nevadans with preexisting conditions. He said he wanted to continue Governor Sandoval's Medicaid expansion and new funding for education. Sisolak supported Question 1, also known as Marsy's Law, the crime victims rights bill, and opposed Question 3, the Energy Choice Initiative.

Sisolak was endorsed by former President Barack Obama, former Vice President Joe Biden, Senator Catherine Cortez Masto, Representative Dina Titus, the Sierra Club, the Human Rights Campaign, Let America Vote, and the Law Enforcement Coalition of Nevada.

Sisolak was elected governor on November 6, 2018, defeating Laxalt with 49.4% of the vote to Laxalt's 45.3%. He lost all but two county-level jurisdictions, but carried the two largest, Clark and Washoe. He won primarily on the strength of carrying Clark County by 86,600 votes, more than double his statewide margin of 39,700. Sisolak became the first Democrat elected governor since 1994.

=== Tenure ===
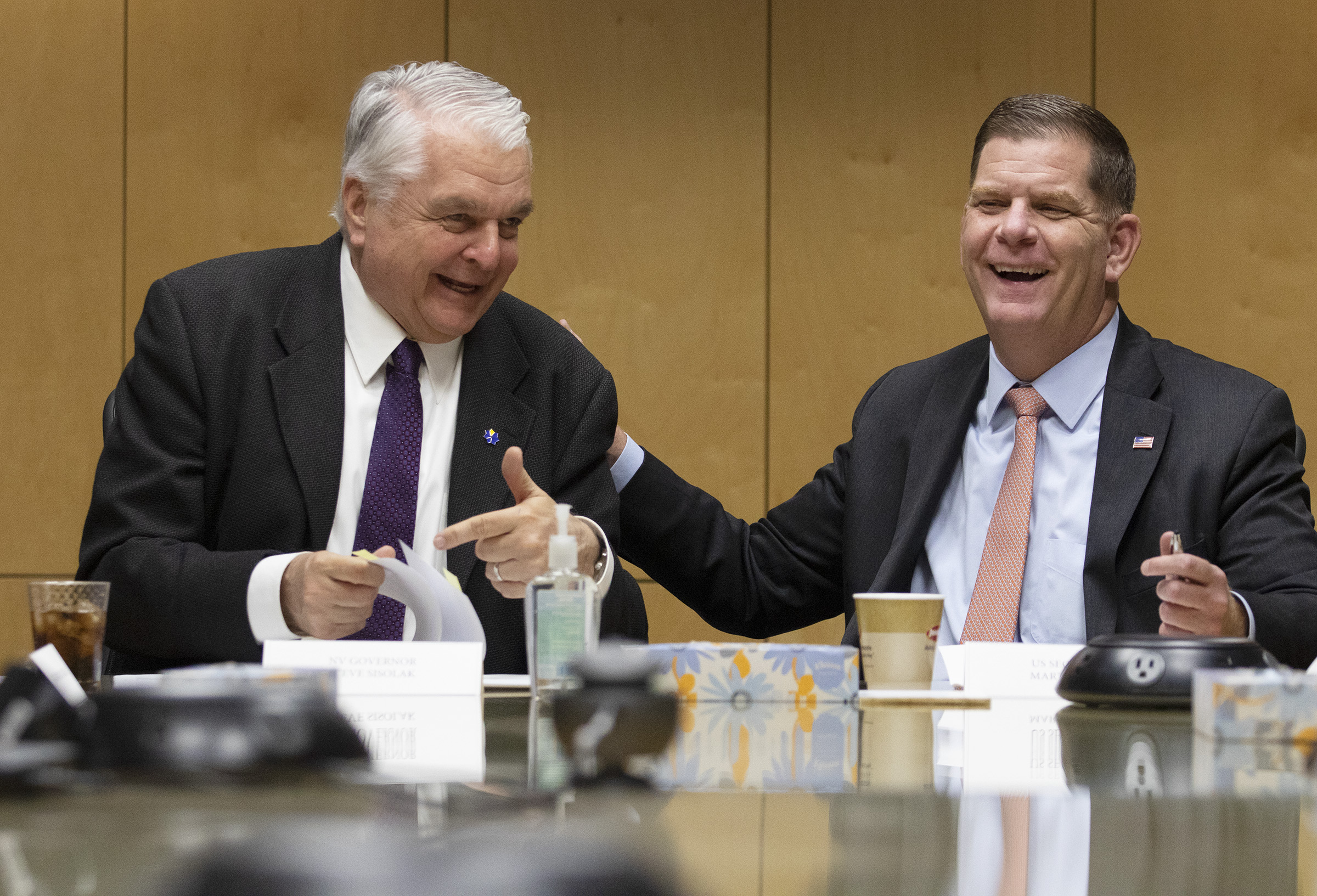
Sisolak with U.S. Labor Secretary Marty Walsh

On January 7, 2019, Sisolak was sworn in as the 30th governor of Nevada. He succeeded Brian Sandoval and became the first Democrat to serve as governor of Nevada since Bob Miller left office in 1999. On May 30, 2019, Sisolak vetoed a bill that proposed the adoption of National Popular Vote Interstate Compact in the presidential elections.

On March 15, 2021, Sisolak, along with Vice President Kamala Harris and Second Gentleman Doug Emhoff, toured a UNLV vaccination site together. Sisolak issued a statement which read "I want to thank Vice President Kamala Harris and Second Gentleman Doug Emhoff for coming to Nevada today to see the incredible work the State is doing – in partnership with leaders, volunteers and organizers at the local level – to administer the COVID-19 vaccines as fast as our federal allocation allows and ensure that all Nevadans who want access to the life-saving vaccines have access as soon as possible."

Sisolak supports capital punishment. In April 2021, the Nevada State Assembly passed a bill that would have repealed Nevada's capital punishment statute, but the state senate did not act on the matter after Sisolak said that he believes some crimes deserve the death penalty, implying he would veto the bill. On September 17, 2021, Kate Marshall resigned as lieutenant governor to take a job in the Biden administration. Sisolak filled the vacancy on December 16, 2021, when he announced Las Vegas educator Lisa Cano Burkhead as Nevada's new lieutenant governor.

Sisolak has supported expansion of solar energy projects in Nevada. Sisolak's views on sensitive subjects such as same-sex marriage, guns, and the death penalty have changed over the years. On a survey titled the Political Courage Test during the 1996 Nevada state legislative election, in which he ran for a seat in the state senate, he answered "no" on whether the Nevada government should recognize same-sex marriage, "undecided" on whether clinics and medical facilities should get public funding to provide abortion services in Nevada, and "undecided" on whether sexual orientation should be added to Nevada's anti-discrimination laws. In the same survey, he supported the death penalty and did not support the decriminalization of marijuana. Since then, many of Sisolak's views have shifted to the left. He is now considered a moderate liberal.

=== 2022 re-election campaign ===
In April 2021, Sisolak announced that he would seek reelection in 2022. He easily won the Democratic nomination against former Clark County Commissioner Tom Collins and faced Clark County Sheriff Joe Lombardo, the Republican nominee, in the general election. On November 11, he was narrowly defeated by Lombardo, winning 47.3% of the vote to Lombardo’s 48.8%, becoming the only incumbent governor to lose reelection in the 2022 midterm elections.

== Personal life ==
Sisolak married Lori Ann "Dallas" Garland in 1987, with whom he has two daughters. Garland filed for divorce in 2000. After the divorce, Sisolak raised his daughters as a single father; both his daughters attended Las Vegas public high schools and the University of Nevada, Las Vegas.

Shortly after being elected governor in 2018, Sisolak announced his engagement to Kathy Ong, an Ely native and his girlfriend of five years. On December 28, 2018, Sisolak announced his marriage to Ong.

== Litigations ==
=== 2005 lawsuit against McCarran Airport ===
Sisolak, a property owner on Las Vegas Boulevard South, received a total of $23.5 million in 2005 after the "airport refused to pay him for height restrictions imposed on a parcel he owned". McCarran officials had warned that paying off property owners who lost land value because of the height restrictions could cost more than $1 billion and make air travel to or from Las Vegas more expensive. Still, the Nevada Supreme Court ruled that landowners can seek compensation if planes flying below 500 feet hinder their ability to develop high-rise buildings. Sisolak maintained that his land, acquired before Clark County imposed height restrictions, had been devalued and that he was entitled to compensation.

=== 2019 Clark County lawsuit ===
Sisolak has been accused by mining corporation Gypsum Resources LLC of engaging in a quid pro quo valued at $150 million during his time as Clark County commissioner chairman. Gypsum claims that at the end of Sisolak's term as chairman, while running for Nevada governor, he exchanged political favors with Save Red Rock attorney Justin Jones, who himself was campaigning for a seat on the Clark County commission. Save Red Rock, a nonprofit environmental activist group, has consistently expressed opposition toward Gypsum Resources LLC since its inception. In 2017, it convinced all Clark County planners to reject Gypsum Resources' latest development proposal. Beginning in December 2016, Save Red Rock has been in an open lawsuit with Clark County, attempting to deny the commission's approval of Gypsum Resources' developments in Red Rock Canyon. Conversely, Clark County has attempted to bar Save Red Rock from raising concerns about Gypsum Resources' development projects at public hearings. This legal battle persisted until the end of 2018, when Save Red Rock suddenly dropped its lawsuit against Clark County. Gypsum Resources claims that this dropped lawsuit was an exchanged favor between Jones and Sisolak. Gypsum alleges that Jones and Sisolak engaged in covert dealings, with Jones agreeing to drop Save Red Rock's lawsuit and provide Sisolak's gubernatorial campaign with the support of environmentalist groups if the Clark County commission denied Gypsum Resources' final appeal to complete its proposed development in Red Rock. The final appeal was scheduled to be heard on December 5, 2018, but this was delayed until 2019 so that “incoming commissioners could weigh in”, according to Sisolak. This action was praised by the Nevada Conservation League, and two weeks later, Save Red Rock dropped its lawsuit. Later in 2019, with Jones as the new county commissioner, Clark County denied Gypsum Resources its final appeal waiver. In Gypsum Resources' bankruptcy filing, it accuses the county of covering up “facts about governmental misconduct” relating to Jones's and Sisolak's covert deals. The county investigated Jones and Sisolak but found no wrongdoing. In this investigation, Jones was deposed about his communication with Sisolak. He originally denied any communication with Sisolak before his election to commissioner, but court documents revealed that they had communicated. Jones detailed to Sisolak's campaign manager that it would be “likely uncomfortable” for members of the commission if Gypsum Resources' appeal were approved. While Clark County has yet to find any wrongdoing, Gypsum Resources maintains the claim that the alleged deal caused its bankruptcy.

== Electoral history ==
=== 2018 ===
2018 Nevada gubernatorial election
Party	Candidate	Votes	%	±%
Democratic	Steve Sisolak	480,007	49.39%	+25.51%
Republican	Adam Laxalt	440,320	45.31%	−25.27%
n/a	None of These Candidates	18,865	1.94%	−0.94%
Independent	Ryan Bundy	13,891	1.43%	N/A
Independent American	Russell Best	10,076	1.04%	−1.62%
Libertarian	Jared Lord	8,640	0.89%	N/A
Total votes		971,799	100.00%	N/A
Democratic gain from Republican				

=== 2022 ===
2022 Nevada gubernatorial election
Party	Candidate	Votes	%	±%
Republican	Joe Lombardo	497,377	48.81%	+3.50%
Democratic	Steve Sisolak (incumbent)	481,991	47.30%	−2.09%
Libertarian	Brandon Davis	14,919	1.46%	+0.57%
None of These Candidates		14,866	1.46%	-0.48%
Independent American	Ed Bridges	9,918	0.97%	−0.07%
Total votes		1,019,071	100.0%	N/A
Republican gain from Democratic				

Political offices
Preceded by Brian Sandoval	Governor of Nevada; 2019–2023	Succeeded by Joe Lombardo
Party political offices
Preceded by Bob Goodman	Democratic nominee for Governor of Nevada; 2018, 2022	Succeeded by Aaron Ford
U.S. order of precedence (ceremonial)
Preceded by Brian Sandoval as Former Governor	Order of precedence of the United States; Within Nevada	Succeeded by Jack Markell as Former Governor
Preceded by Brian Sandoval as Former Governor	Order of precedence of the United States; Outside Nevada	Succeeded by Kay A. Orr as Former Governor
