= 2026 United States House of Representatives elections in Nevada =

- November 3, 2026

All 4 Nevada seats to the United States House of Representatives
	Majority party	Minority party
Party	Democratic	Republican
Last election	3	1
Seats won	4	0
Seat change	▲1	▼1
Popular vote	621,724	432,390
Percentage	57.01%	39.65%
Swing	▲19.58%	▼8.89%

Democratic hold Democratic gain
Democratic
50–60%
60–70%
Republican
50–60%
60–70%
70–80%
80–90%

The 2026 United States House of Representatives elections in Nevada were held on November 3, 2026, to elect the four U.S. representatives from the state of Nevada, one from each of the state's congressional districts. The elections will coincide with the other elections to the House of Representatives, elections to the United States Senate, and various state and local elections. The primary elections took place on June 9, 2026.

Democrats won the 2nd district for the first time ever since its creation after the 1980 census, and unitary control of its U.S. House delegation.

== Statewide polling ==
=== Statewide congressional polls ===
Poll source	Date(s) administered	Sample size (Note: Key: A – all adults RV – registered voters LV – likely voters V – unclear)	Margin of error	Democratic	Republican	Other	Undecided
Concord Public Opinion Partners (D) (Note: Poll sponsored by Education Reform Now Advocacy)	September 26–30, 2026	565 (LV)	± 4.12%	48%	33%	7% (Note: "Someone else" with 7%)	12%

== Overview ==
=== Statewide ===
Party	Candi- dates	Votes		Seats		
Party	Candi- dates	No.	%	No.	+/–	%
Democratic Party	4	621,724	57.01%	4	▲1	. 100%
Republican Party	4	432,390	39.65%	0	▼1	0%
Independent American Party	3	26,717	2.45%	0	Steady	0%
Independent	3	9,737	0.89%	0	Steady	0%
Total	14	1,090,568	100%	4	Steady	100%

Popular vote
Democratic	57.01%
Republican	39.65%
Independent American	2.45%
Independent	0.89%

House seats
Democratic	100.00%
Republican	0.00%

=== By district ===
District	Democratic		Republican		Others		Total		Result
District	Votes	%	Votes	%	Votes	%	Votes	%	Result
District 1	142,035	59.31%	90,024	37.59%	7,429	3.10%	239,488	21.96%	Democratic hold
District 2	163,773	50.41%	143,336	44.12%	17,757	5.47%	324,866	29.79%	Democratic gain
District 3	162,520	59.63%	103,629	38.02%	6,390	2.34%	272,539	24.99%	Democratic hold
District 4	153,396	60.47%	95,401	37.61%	4,878	1.92%	253,675	23.26%	Democratic hold
Total	621,724	57.01%	432,390	39.65%	36,454	3.34%	1,090,568	100.0%	

== District 1 ==
2026 Nevada's 1st congressional district election
- Reporting: 99% as of November 8, 11:54 PST
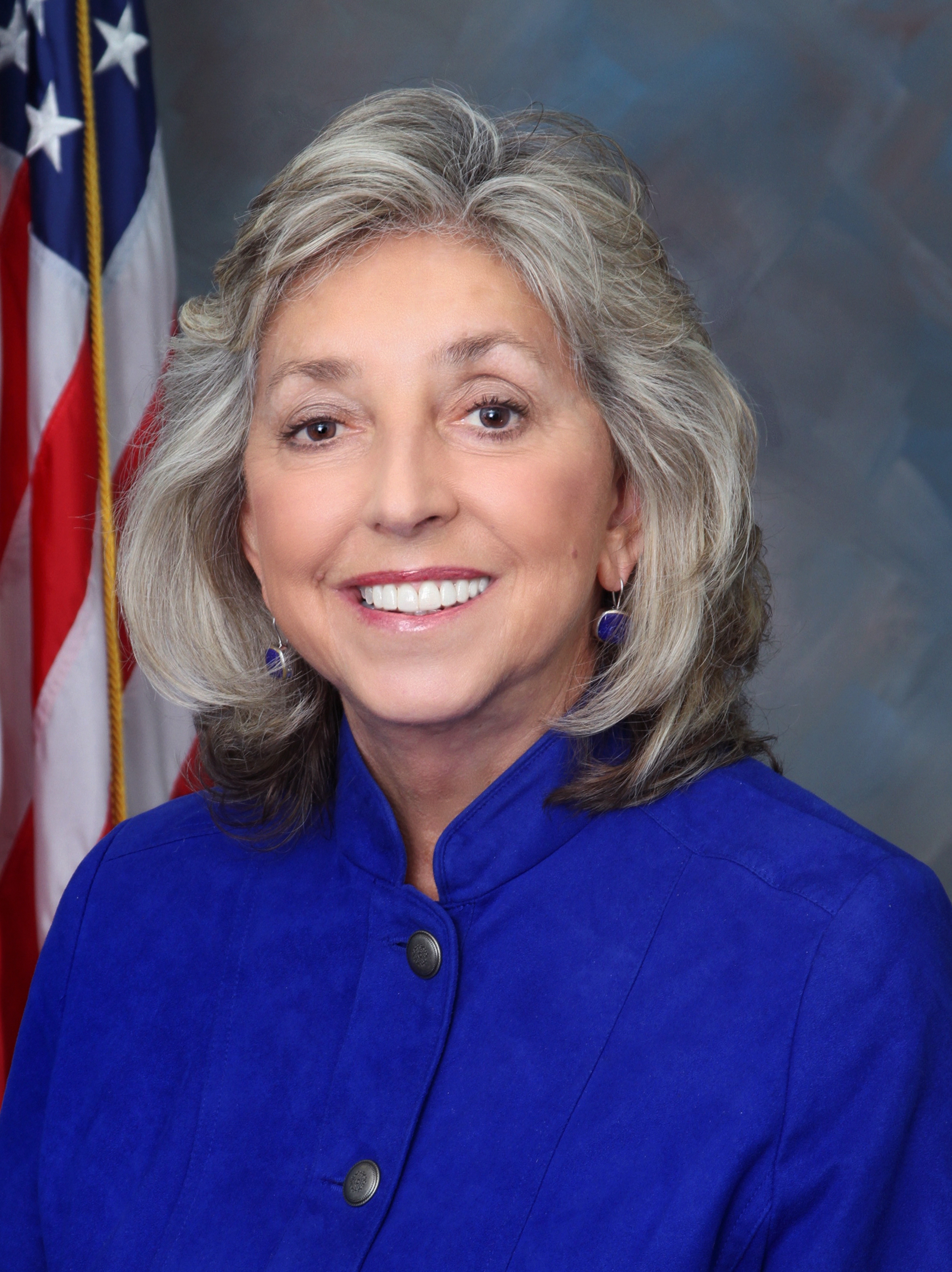

Nominee	Dina Titus	Carrie Buck
Party	Democratic	Republican
Popular vote	140,944	89,724
Percentage	59.2%	37.7%
U.S. Representative before election
Dina Titus
Democratic
Elected U.S. Representative
Dina Titus
Democratic

The 1st district expands from inner Las Vegas towards its southeastern suburbs and some rural parts of Clark County, taking in the cities of Paradise, Henderson, and Boulder City. The incumbent is Democrat Dina Titus, who was re-elected with 52.0% of the vote in 2024.

=== Democratic primary ===
==== Nominee ====
- Dina Titus, incumbent U.S. representative

===== Eliminated in primary =====
- Gabriel Cornejo, perennial candidate
- Joy Hoover, businesswoman and nonprofit founder
- Luis Paniagua

===== Withdrawn =====
- Alex Pereszlenyi, data analyst

==== Endorsements ====
Joy Hoover

Organizations

- Progressive Leadership Alliance of Nevada Action
Dina Titus

Labor unions

- National Education Association
- Professional Firefighters of Nevada

Organizations

- AIPAC
- Democratic Majority for Israel
- Christopher Street Project
- Elect Democratic Women
- EMILY's List
- Giffords
- Jewish Democratic Council of America
- Joint Action Committee for Political Affairs
- League of Conservation Voters Action Fund
- National Organization for Women PAC
- National Women's Political Caucus
- Planned Parenthood Action Fund
- Population Connection
- Reproductive Freedom for All

==== Fundraising ====
Italics indicate a withdrawn candidate.

Campaign finance reports as of March 31, 2026
Candidate	Raised	Spent	Cash on hand
Joy Hoover (D)	$67,424	$65,982	$1,441
Alex Pereszlenyi (D)	$9,412	$9,412	$0
Dina Titus (D)	$1,154,633	$250,354	$1,059,642
Source: Federal Election Commission

==== Results ====
Democratic primary results
Party	Candidate	Votes	%
Democratic	Dina Titus (incumbent)	33,605	75.9
Democratic	Joy Hoover	5,782	13.1
Democratic	Gabriel Cornejo	3,883	8.8
Democratic	Luis Paniagua	1,022	2.3
Total votes		44,292	100.0

=== Republican primary ===
==== Candidates ====
===== Nominee =====
- Carrie Buck, state senator from the 5th district (2020–present)

===== Eliminated in primary =====
- Marie Encar Arnold
- Jim Blockey, candidate for this district in 2024
- Michael Boris, appliance repair contractor and candidate for this district in 2024
- Rick Saga, former health services executive

===== Did not file =====
- Roy Gurner, systems engineer
- Jim Marchant, former state assemblyman from the 37th district (2016–2018), candidate for U.S. Senate in 2024, nominee for secretary of state in 2022, and nominee for the 4th district in 2020 (running for secretary of state)

===== Withdrawn =====
- Keith Hanoff, retired police officer

==== Endorsements ====
Carrie Buck

Executive branch officials

- Donald Trump, 45th and 47th president of the United States (2017–2021, 2025–present)

U.S. representatives

- Richard Hudson, NC-09 (2013–present)

Organizations

- Maggie's List
- NRCC MAGA Majority

==== Fundraising ====
Italics indicate a withdrawn candidate.

Campaign finance reports as of March 31, 2026
Candidate	Raised	Spent	Cash on hand
Jim Blockey (R)	$18,451	$17,521	$929
Carrie Buck (R)	$934,219	$565,180	$369,039
Keith Hanoff (R)	$31,711	$31,711	$0
Jim Marchant (R)	$4,846	$4,681	$164
Source: Federal Election Commission

==== Results ====
Republican primary results
Party	Candidate	Votes	%
Republican	Carrie Buck	24,680	77.7
Republican	Jim Blockey	3,551	11.2
Republican	Michael Boris	1,873	5.9
Republican	Marie Encar Arnold	1,230	3.9
Republican	Rick Saga	410	1.3
Total votes		31,744	100.0

=== Independents ===
==== Candidates ====
- Bobby Khan, former car dealer and convicted felon
- Steven St John, chaplain and candidate for the 3rd district in 2014

===== Withdrawn =====
- Anthony Thomas Jr., Democratic candidate for this district in 2020
- Victor Willert, retired educator and perennial candidate

==== Fundraising ====
Italics indicate a withdrawn candidate.

Campaign finance reports as of March 31, 2026
Candidate	Raised	Spent	Cash on hand
Bobby Khan (I)	$80,169	$63,225	$16,944
Source: Federal Election Commission

=== General election ===
==== Predictions ====
Source	Ranking	As of
Decision Desk HQ	Likely D	July 14, 2026
The Cook Political Report	Likely D	February 6, 2025
Inside Elections	Lean D	March 7, 2025
Sabato's Crystal Ball	Likely D	July 15, 2025
Silver Bulletin	Likely D	August 23, 2026

==== Fundraising ====
Campaign finance reports as of October 14, 2026
Candidate	Raised	Spent	Cash on hand
Dina Titus (D)	$2,055,144	$2,008,273	$202,235
Carrie Buck (R)	$2,632,235	$2,447,972	$184,263
Source: Federal Election Commission

==== Results ====
2026 Nevada's 1st congressional district election
Party	Candidate	Votes	%	±%
Democratic	Dina Titus (incumbent)	142,035	59.31	+7.31
Republican	Carrie Ann Buck	90,024	37.59	−6.91
Independent	Steven "Chap" St John	4,146	1.73	N/A
Independent	Afzal "Bobby" Khan	3,283	1.37	N/A
Total votes		239,488	100.00	
Democratic hold		Swing	+7.11	

By county

County	Dina Titus Democratic		Carrie Ann Buck Republican		Various candidates Other parties		Margin		Total votes cast
County	#	%	#	%	#	%	#	%	Total votes cast
Clark (part)	142,035	59.31%	90,024	37.59%	7,429	3.10%	52,011	21.72%	239,488
Totals	142,035	59.31%	90,024	37.59%	7,429	3.10%	52,011	21.72%	239,488

== District 2 ==
2026 Nevada's 2nd congressional district election
- Reporting: 99% as of November 8, 4:23 PM PST

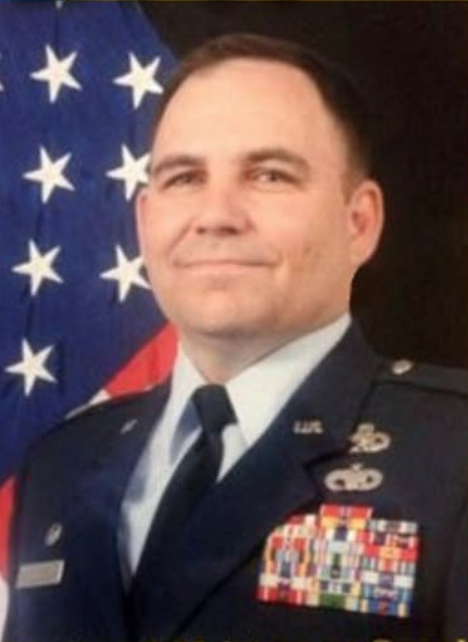

Nominee	Teresa Benitez-Thompson	David Flippo	Lynn Chapman
Party	Democratic	Republican	Independent American
Popular vote	161,066	142,066	17,546
Percentage	50.2%	44.3%	5.5%
- County results Benitez-Thompson: 50–60% Flippo: 50–60% 60–70% 70–80% No votes
U.S. Representative before election
Mark Amodei
Republican
Elected U.S. Representative
Teresa Benitez-Thompson
Democratic

The 2nd district includes White Pine County and part of Lyon County, and contains the cities of Reno, Sparks, and Carson City. The incumbent is Republican Mark Amodei, who was re-elected with 55.0% of the vote in 2024 against an independent candidate.

=== Republican primary ===
==== Candidates ====
===== Nominee =====
- David Flippo, financial advisor, former Air Force lieutenant colonel, and candidate for Nevada's 4th congressional district in 2024 (previously ran in the 4th district)

===== Eliminated in primary =====
- Jennifer Billat, entrepreneur
- Tom Doyle
- George Forbush, police officer
- Bruce Grego, former South Lake Tahoe, California city councilor
- Andrea Lowe, board director for the Nevada Association of School Boards
- Jerry Olsen
- James Settelmeyer, director of the Nevada Department of Conservation and Natural Resources (2023–present) and former minority leader of the Nevada Senate (2018–2022) from the 17th district (2010–2022)
- Rick Shepherd
- Fred Simon, doctor, candidate for governor in 2022, and candidate for this district in 2024
- Mike Smith
- Sherman Tylawsky, civic educator

===== Withdrawn =====
- Mark Amodei, incumbent U.S. representative (2011–present) (initially declined to endorse and later endorsed Settelmeyer)
- Bill Conrad, former Modesto, California city councilor (1997–2003) and candidate for U.S. Senate in 2022 and 2024
- Doug Miller
- Jesse Watts, former Eureka County sheriff (endorsed Settelmeyer, remained on ballot)

===== Declined =====
- Sam Brown, under secretary of Veterans Affairs for Memorial Affairs (2025–present), nominee for U.S. Senate in 2024, and candidate in 2022
- Paul Enos, trade association executive (endorsed Settelmeyer)
- Joey Gilbert, attorney, former boxer, and candidate for governor in 2022 (endorsed Flippo)
- Tony Grady Jr., Reno Air Races director of flight operations, candidate for lieutenant governor in 2022, and candidate for U.S. Senate in 2024
- Ken Gray, advisor to the National Cemetery Administration (2025–present) and former state assemblymember from the 39th district (2022–2025) (running for state assembly)
- Ira Hansen, state senator from the 14th district (2018–present)
- Adam Laxalt, former Nevada attorney general (2015–2019), nominee for governor in 2018, and nominee for U.S. Senate in 2022
- Andy Matthews, Nevada state controller (2023–present) (running for re-election)
- Danny Tarkanian, Douglas County commissioner (2021–present) and candidate for this district in 2022 (running for attorney general)
- Robin Titus, minority leader of the Nevada Senate (2024–present) from the 17th district (2022–present) (running for re-election)

==== Endorsements ====
David Flippo

Executive branch officials

- Richard Grenell, special presidential envoy for Special Missions (2025–present)
- Donald Trump, 45th and 47th president of the United States (2017–2021, 2025–present)

U.S. representatives

- Lauren Boebert, CO-4 (2021–present)
- Eric Burlison, MO-07 (2023–present)
- Eli Crane, AZ-2 (2023–present)
- Jeff Duncan, SC-3 (2011–2025)
- Matt Gaetz, FL-1 (2017–2024)
- Paul Gosar, AZ-09 (2011–present)
- Abe Hamadeh, AZ-8 (2025–present)
- Trent Kelly, MS-1 (2015–present)
- Anna Paulina Luna, FL-13 (2023–present)
- Mary Miller, IL-15 (2021–present)
- Ralph Norman, SC-5 (2017–present)
- Andy Ogles, TN-5 (2023–present)
- Allen West, FL-22 (2011–2013)

Local officials

- Joe Arpaio, former sheriff of Maricopa County (1993–2017)

Organizations

- Freedom Caucus Fund
- Turning Point Action
James Settelmeyer

U.S. representatives

- Mark Amodei, NV-02 (2011–present) (previously declined to endorse)

Statewide officials

- Stavros Anthony, lieutenant governor of Nevada (2023–present)
- Gregory Haffen II, Nevada Assembly minority leader
- Joe Lombardo, governor of Nevada (2023–present)
- Robin Titus, minority leader of the Nevada Senate (2024–present)
Mark Amodei (withdrawn)

Executive branch officials

- Donald Trump, 45th and 47th president of the United States (2017–2021, 2025–present)

Organizations

- AIPAC
Declined to endorse

U.S. representatives

- ~~Mark Amodei, U.S. representative from Nevada's 2nd congressional district (2011–present)~~ (later endorsed Settelmeyer)

==== Fundraising ====
Italics indicate a withdrawn candidate.

Campaign finance reports as of March 31, 2026
Candidate	Raised	Spent	Cash on hand
Mark Amodei (R)	$521,642	$327,815	$554,868
David Flippo (R)	$1,733,805	$1,104,505	$644,015
James Settelmeyer (R)	$108,270	$$5,256	$103,014
Source: Federal Election Commission

==== Results ====
Primary results by county: Flippo: 30–40%; 40–50%; 50–60%; Settelmeyer: 30–40%; 40–50%; No votes

Republican primary results
Party	Candidate	Votes	%
Republican	David Flippo	38,174	46.9
Republican	James Settelmeyer	28,131	34.5
Republican	George Forbush	3,337	4.1
Republican	Mike Smith	2,762	3.4
Republican	Tom Doyle	1,717	2.1
Republican	Fred Simon	1,616	2.0
Republican	Jennifer Billat	1,464	1.8
Republican	Jesse Watts (withdrawn)	1,264	1.6
Republican	Andrea Lowe	1,130	1.4
Republican	Rick Shepherd	720	0.9
Republican	Jerry Olsen	608	0.7
Republican	Sherman Tylawsky	278	0.3
Republican	Bruce Grego	223	0.3
Total votes		81,424	100.0

=== Democratic primary ===
==== Candidates ====
===== Nominee =====
- Teresa Benitez-Thompson, chief of staff to Nevada Attorney General Aaron Ford and former majority leader of the Nevada Assembly (2016–2022) from the 27th district (2010–2022)

===== Eliminated in primary =====
- Kathy Durham, former West Wendover city councilor
- Gamaliel Zavala Enriquez, community organizer
- Matthew Fonken, former executive director of the Nevada Democratic Party
- Gerold Gorman
- Johnny E. Kerns, retired homicide investigator
- Greg Kidd, entrepreneur and independent candidate for this seat in 2024
- Morgan Wadsworth, college student

===== Withdrawn =====
- Josh Hebert, physicist (endorsed Wadsworth, remained on ballot)
- Mark Jolle, business owner (remained on ballot)
- Samuel White (endorsed Wadsworth, remained on ballot)

===== Declined =====
- Alexis Hill, Washoe County commissioner (2021–present) (running for governor)
- Selena La Rue Hatch, state assemblymember from the 25th district (2022–present) (running for re-election, endorsed Benitez-Thompson)
- Kate Marshall, former lieutenant governor of Nevada (2019–2021) and nominee for this seat in 2011 (running for mayor of Reno)
- Joe Rodriguez, Sparks city councilor
- Beth Smith, member of the Washoe County Board of Education
- Angie Taylor, state senator from the 15th district (2024–present)

==== Endorsements ====
Teresa Benitez-Thompson

U.S. representatives

- Steven Horsford, NV-04 (2019–present)

State legislators

- Selena La Rue Hatch, state assemblymember from the 25th district (2022–present)

Organizations

- Culinary Workers Union Local 226
- National Organization for Women PAC
- Progressive Leadership Alliance of Nevada Action
Matthew Fonken

State legislators

- Edgar Flores, SD-02 (2022–present)

Local officials

- Tick Segerblom, Clark County commissioner (2019–present)

Organizations

- Indivisible Northern Nevada
Greg Kidd

U.S. representatives

- Susie Lee, NV-03 (2019–present)
Morgan Wadsworth

Organizations

- Track AIPAC

==== Fundraising ====
Campaign finance reports as of March 31, 2026
Candidate	Raised	Spent	Cash on hand
Teresa Benitez-Thompson (D)	$57,120 (Note: $20,000 of this total was self-funded by Benitez-Thompson.)	$3,807	$53,312
Kathy Durham (D)	$14,523 (Note: $2,600 of this total was self-funded by Durham.)	$9,900	$4,623
Matthew Fonken (D)	$59,615	$51,876	$7,738
Joshua Hebert (D)	$19,371 (Note: $10,347 of this total was self-funded by Hebert.)	$11,309	$15,965
Greg Kidd (D)	$562,946 (Note: $560,000 of this total was self-funded by Kidd.)	$602,110	$22,637
Morgan Wadsworth (D)	$3,643 (Note: $675 of this total was self-funded by Wadsworth.)	$463	$3,204
Source: Federal Election Commission

==== Results ====
Primary results by county: Benitez-Thompson: 20–30%; 30–40%; 40–50%; Kidd: 20–30%; No votes

Democratic primary results
Party	Candidate	Votes	%
Democratic	Teresa Benitez-Thompson	23,706	45.6
Democratic	Greg Kidd	11,714	22.5
Democratic	Kathy Durham	5,973	11.5
Democratic	Morgan Wadsworth	4,877	9.4
Democratic	Matthew Fonken	3,204	6.2
Democratic	Gamaliel Zavala Enriquez	863	1.7
Democratic	Josh Hebert (withdrawn)	421	0.8
Democratic	Johnny E. Kerns	375	0.7
Democratic	Mark Jolle (withdrawn)	357	0.7
Democratic	Samuel White (withdrawn)	320	0.6
Democratic	Gerold Gorman	221	0.4
Total votes		52,031	100.0

=== Independent and third-party candidates ===
==== Candidates ====
===== Declared =====
- Lynn Chapman (Independent American)

===== Declined =====
- Hillary Schieve (Independent), mayor of Reno (2014–present)

=== General election ===
==== Predictions ====
Source	Ranking	As of
Decision Desk HQ	Lean R	October 30, 2026
The Cook Political Report	Lean R	October 23, 2026
Inside Elections	Tilt R	October 29, 2026
Sabato's Crystal Ball	Lean R	October 20, 2026
Silver Bulletin	Likely R	August 23, 2026

==== Post-primary endorsements ====
David Flippo (R)

Statewide officials

- Joe Lombardo, governor of Nevada (2023–present)

State legislators

- Robin Titus, minority leader of the Nevada Senate (2024–present) from the 17th district (2022–present)

Organizations

- U.S. Chamber of Commerce
Teresa Benitez-Thompson (D)

Executive branch officials

- Pete Buttigieg, former secretary of transportation (2021–2025)

U.S. representatives

- Suzan DelBene, WA-01 (2012–present)
- Linda Sánchez, CA-38 (2003–present)
- Greg Stanton, AZ-04 (2019–present)

State legislators

- James Oscarson, former state assemblymember from the 36th district (2013–2018) (Republican)

Organizations

- CHC BOLD PAC
- DCCC Red to Blue
- J Street
- League of Conservation Voters Action Fund
- NewDem Action Fund
Declined to endorse

U.S. representatives

- Mark Amodei, NV-02 (2011–present) (Republican)

==== Fundraising ====
Campaign finance reports as of October 14, 2026
Candidate	Raised	Spent	Cash on hand
David Flippo (R)	$2,934,108	$2,787,661	$161,162
Teresa Benitez-Thompson (D)	$1,054,467	$872,618	$181,849
Source: Federal Election Commission

==== Polling ====
Poll source	Date(s) administered	Sample size	Margin of error	David Flippo (R)	Teresa Benitez-Thompson (D)	Lynn Chapman (IA)	Other	Undecided
GBAO (D) (Note: Poll sponsored by the Nevada Alliance, which supports Benitez-Thompson)	August 31 – September 3, 2026	500 (LV)	—	37%	38%	14%	—	11%
Strategies 360 (Note: Poll sponsored by Benitez-Thompson's campaign)	August 22–26, 2026	400 (LV)	± 4.9%	45%	42%	7%	1% (Note: "Someone else" with 1%)	6%

Hypothetical polling

Generic Republican vs. generic Democrat

Poll source	Date(s) administered	Sample size	Margin of error	Generic Republican	Generic Democrat	Undecided
GBAO (D)	August 31 – September 3, 2026	500 (LV)	—	48%	42%	10%

==== Results ====
For the first time since the district was created in the 1980 United States census, a Democrat won the seat. Additionally, this seat had the largest swing against Republicans of any congressional district in Nevada, at over 25%.

2026 Nevada's 2nd congressional district election
Party	Candidate	Votes	%	±%
Democratic	Teresa F. Benitez-Thompson	163,773	50.41	N/A
Republican	David Flippo	143,336	44.12	−10.88
Independent American	Lynn Chapman	17,757	5.47	+0.47
Total votes		324,866	100.00	
Democratic gain from Republican		Swing	N/A	

==== By county ====
County	Teresa F. Benitez-Thompson Democratic		David Flippo Republican		Lynn Chapman Independent American		Margin		Total votes cast
County	#	%	#	%	#	%	#	%	Total votes cast
Carson City	12,710	50.89%	10,619	42.52%	1,648	6.60%	2,091	8.37%	24,977
Churchill	2,754	28.62%	6,076	63.15%	791	8.22%	-3,322	-34.53%	9,621
Douglas	10,543	36.61%	16,565	57.53%	1,688	5.86%	-6,022	-20.91%	28,796
Elko	4,223	28.02%	9,646	64.00%	1,202	7.98%	-5,423	-35.98%	15,071
Eureka	92	11.59%	606	76.32%	96	12.09%	-514	-64.74%	794
Humboldt	1,559	27.84%	3,590	64.12%	450	8.04%	-2,031	-36.27%	5,599
Lander	456	22.88%	1,353	67.89%	184	9.23%	-897	-45.01%	1,993
Lincoln	Data hidden								
Lyon	7,936	32.94%	14,324	59.46%	1,831	7.60%	-6,388	-26.52%	24,091
Pershing	426	25.22%	1,137	67.32%	126	7.46%	-711	-42.10%	1,689
Storey	829	34.38%	1,407	58.36%	175	7.26%	-578	-23.97%	2,411
Washoe	121,454	58.75%	75,954	36.74%	9,338	4.52%	45,500	22.01%	206,746
White Pine	791	25.70%	2,059	66.89%	228	7.41%	-1,268	-41.20%	3,078
Totals	163,773	50.41%	143,336	44.12%	17,757	5.47%	20,437	6.29%	324,866

== District 3 ==
2026 Nevada's 3rd congressional district election
- Reporting: 99% as of November 8, 4:23 PM PST

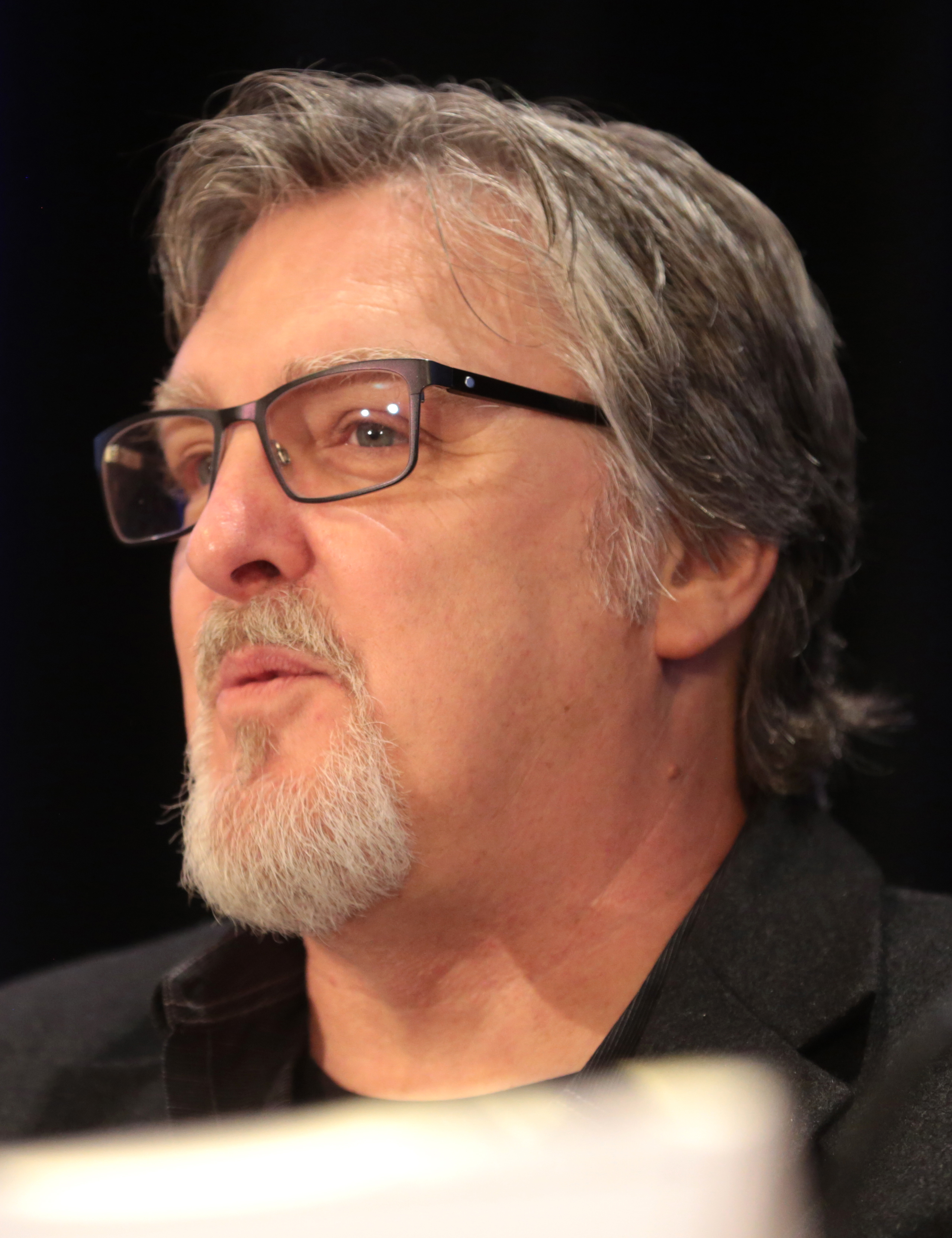
Nominee	Susie Lee	Martin O'Donnell
Party	Democratic	Republican
Popular vote	161,418	103,197
Percentage	59.6%	38.1%
U.S. Representative before election
Susie Lee
Democratic
Elected U.S. Representative
Susie Lee
Democratic

The 3rd district comprises the western Las Vegas suburbs, including Spring Valley, Summerlin South, and Sandy Valley. The incumbent is Democrat Susie Lee, who was re-elected with 51.4% of the vote in 2024.

=== Democratic primary ===
==== Candidates ====
===== Nominee =====
- Susie Lee, incumbent U.S. representative

===== Eliminated in primary =====
- James Lally, cardiologist
- Terrill Robinson, Marine Corps veteran
- Brandon West

==== Endorsements ====
James Lally

Organizations

- Track AIPAC
Susie Lee

Statewide officials

- Wes Moore, governor of Maryland (2023–present)

Labor unions

- National Education Association
- Professional Firefighters of Nevada

Organizations

- AIPAC
- Brady Campaign
- Democratic Majority for Israel
- Elect Democratic Women
- EMILY's List
- Giffords
- Jewish Democratic Council of America
- Joint Action Committee for Political Affairs
- League of Conservation Voters Action Fund
- National Organization for Women PAC
- Planned Parenthood Action Fund
- Population Connection
- Reproductive Freedom for All
- U.S. Chamber of Commerce

==== Fundraising ====
Campaign finance reports as of March 31, 2026
Candidate	Raised	Spent	Cash on hand
James Lally (D)	$839,271	$649,072	$190,199
Susie Lee (D)	$3,498,064	$895,743	$3,068,975
Source: Federal Election Commission

==== Results ====
Democratic primary results
Party	Candidate	Votes	%
Democratic	Susie Lee (incumbent)	31,712	69.2
Democratic	James Lally	9,324	20.4
Democratic	Terrill Robinson	2,996	6.5
Democratic	Brandon West	1,776	3.9
Total votes		45,808	100.0

=== Republican primary ===
==== Candidates ====
===== Nominee =====
- Martin O'Donnell, composer and candidate for this district in 2024

===== Eliminated in primary =====
- Tera Anderson, asset development manager and candidate for mayor of Las Vegas in 2024
- Jeff Gunter, former U.S. ambassador to Iceland (2019–2021) and candidate for U.S. Senate in 2024
- Aury Nagy, neurosurgeon

===== Withdrawn =====
- Chris Brandlin, lawyer
- Lydia Dominguez, Clark County school board trustee
- Steve London, accountant
- Lucena Parker
- Joshua Walters, real estate investor

==== Endorsements ====
Tera Anderson

Statewide officials

- Bob List, former governor of Nevada (1979–1983)
Martin O'Donnell

Executive branch officials

- Donald Trump, 45th and 47th president of the United States (2017–2021, 2025–present)

U.S. representatives

- Richard Hudson, NC-09 (2013–present)

Organizations

- NRCC MAGA Majority

==== Fundraising ====
Italics indicate a withdrawn candidate.

Campaign finance reports as of March 31, 2026
Candidate	Raised	Spent	Cash on hand
Tera Anderson (R)	$286,720 (Note: $100,100 of this total was self-funded by Anderson)	$99,294	$187,426
Chris Brandlin (R)	$191,276	$191,276	$0
Lydia Dominguez (R)	$27,465	$27,465	$0
Jeff Gunter (R)	$777,063 (Note: $750,000 of this total was self-funded by Gunter)	$747,003	$30,059
Steve London (R)	$42,404	$42,404	$0
Aury Nagy (R)	$1,076,398 (Note: $1,020,000 of this total was self-funded by Nagy)	$330,476	$745,921
Marty O'Donnell (R)	$3,225,990 (Note: $3,000,000 of this total was self-funded by O'Donnell)	$503,914	$2,722,076
Joshua Walters (R)	$47,841	$47,841	$0
Source: Federal Election Commission

==== Results ====
Republican primary results
Party	Candidate	Votes	%
Republican	Martin O'Donnell	14,892	42.3
Republican	Tera Anderson	8,482	24.1
Republican	Jeff Gunter	6,879	19.5
Republican	Aury Nagy	4,945	14.0
Total votes		35,198	100.0

=== Independent and third-party candidates ===
==== Candidates ====
===== Declared =====
- David Anderson (Independent)
- Dean Johnson (Independent)
- Jon Kamerath (Independent American)

=== General election ===
==== Predictions ====
Source	Ranking	As of
Decision Desk HQ	Likely D	September 8, 2026
The Cook Political Report	Likely D	October 9, 2026
Inside Elections	Lean D	March 7, 2025
Sabato's Crystal Ball	Likely D	October 20, 2026
Silver Bulletin	Solid D	August 23, 2026

==== Fundraising ====
Campaign finance reports as of October 14, 2026
Candidate	Raised	Spent	Cash on hand
Susie Lee (D)	$5,942,432	$5,477,793	$931,294
Martin O'Donnell (R)	$4,864,563	$4,680,014	$184,549
Source: Federal Election Commission

==== Polling ====
Poll source	Date(s) administered	Sample size	Margin of error	Susie Lee (D)	Martin O'Donnell (R)	Other	Undecided
RedBox Research (D) (Note: Poll sponsored by A Fight Worth Having)	October 20-23, 2026	687 (LV)	± 5.1%	49%	42%	5% (Note: Jon Kamerath (I) with 3%; "Someone else" with 2%)	4%

==== Results ====
2026 Nevada's 3rd congressional district election
Party	Candidate	Votes	%	±%
Democratic	Susie Lee (incumbent)	162,520	59.63	+8.26
Republican	Martin O'Donnell	103,629	38.02	−10.61
Independent American	Jon Kamerath	6,390	2.34	N/A
Total votes		272,539	100.00	
Democratic hold		Swing	+9.44	

==== By county ====
County	Susie Lee Democratic		Martin O'Donnell Republican		Jon Kamerath Independent American		Margin		Total votes cast
County	#	%	#	%	#	%	#	%	Total votes cast
Clark (part)	162,520	59.63%	103,629	38.02%	6,390	2.34%	58,891	21.61%	272,539
Totals	162,520	59.63%	103,629	38.02%	6,390	2.34%	58,891	21.61%	272,539

== District 4 ==
2026 Nevada's 4th congressional district election
- Reporting: 99% as of November 8, 4:23 PM PST
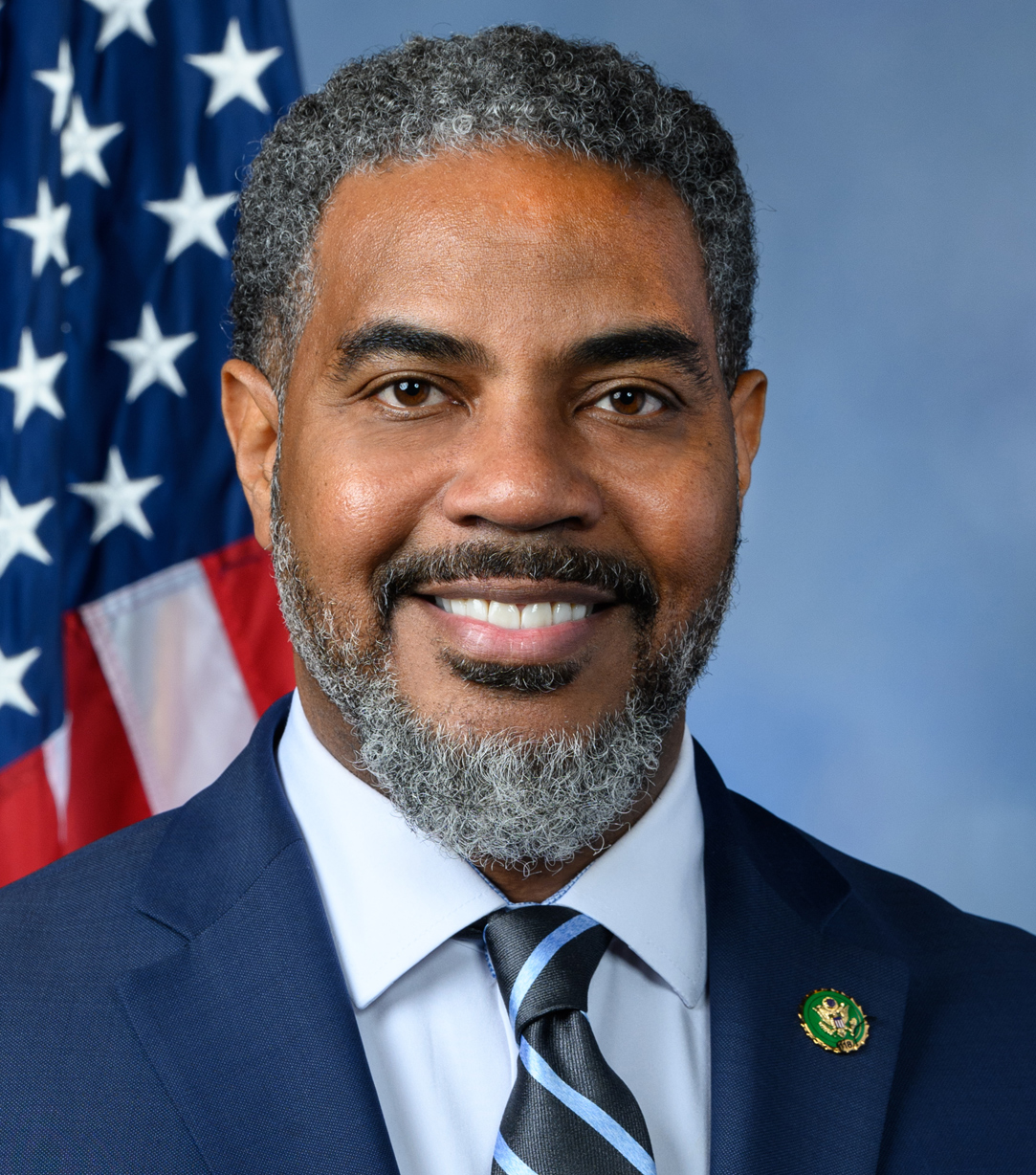

Nominee	Steven Horsford	Cody Whipple
Party	Democratic	Republican
Popular vote	152,008	94,741
Percentage	60.4%	37.7%
- County results Horsford: 60–70% 90–100% Whipple: 50–60% 60–70% 70–80% 80–90%
U.S. Representative before election
Steven Horsford
Democratic
Elected U.S. Representative
Steven Horsford
Democratic

The 4th district covers parts of northern Las Vegas, taking in the Las Vegas Strip, as well as its northern suburbs and rural central Nevada. The incumbent is Democrat Steven Horsford, who was re-elected with 52.7% of the vote in 2024.

=== Democratic primary ===
==== Candidates ====
===== Nominee =====
- Steven Horsford, incumbent U.S. representative

==== Endorsements ====
Steven Horsford

Statewide officials

- Wes Moore, governor of Maryland (2023–present)

Labor unions

- National Education Association
- Professional Firefighters of Nevada

Organizations

- AIPAC
- Black Economic Alliance PAC
- Brady Campaign
- Giffords
- Jewish Democratic Council of America
- Joint Action Committee for Political Affairs
- League of Conservation Voters Action Fund
- Planned Parenthood Action Fund
- Population Connection
- Progressive Leadership Alliance of Nevada Action
- Reproductive Freedom for All

==== Fundraising ====
Campaign finance reports as of March 31, 2026
Candidate	Raised	Spent	Cash on hand
Steven Horsford (D)	$2,574,891	$1,464,880	$1,116,301
Source: Federal Election Commission

=== Republican primary ===
==== Candidates ====
===== Nominee =====
- Cody Whipple, telecommunications business owner

===== Eliminated in primary =====
- Ronda Kennedy, attorney
- Anthony Snowden, healthcare professional

===== Did not file =====
- Aaron Hill, IT director

===== Withdrawn =====
- David Flippo, financial advisor and candidate for this district in 2024 (running in the 2nd district)

==== Endorsements ====
Cody Whipple

U.S. representatives

- Cresent Hardy, former NV-04 (2015–2017)
- Celeste Maloy, UT-02 (2023–present)
David Flippo (withdrawn)

U.S. representatives

- Lauren Boebert, CO-04 (2021–present)
- Jeff Duncan, former SC-03 (2011–2025)
- Paul Gosar, AZ-09 (2011–present)
- Trent Kelly, MS-01 (2015–present)

Organizations

- Veterans for America First

==== Fundraising ====
Italics indicate a withdrawn candidate.

Campaign finance reports as of March 31, 2026
Candidate	Raised	Spent	Cash on hand
Aaron Hill (R)	$48,442	$43,870	$4,571
Ronda Kennedy (R)	$350,000	$5,689	$344,310
Cody Whipple (R)	$622,721	$249,263	$373,457
Source: Federal Election Commission

==== Results ====
Republican primary results
Party	Candidate	Votes	%
Republican	Cody Whipple	22,103	61.8
Republican	Ronda Kennedy	8,062	22.5
Republican	Anthony Snowden	5,597	15.7
Total votes		35,762	100.0

=== Independent and third-party candidates ===
==== Candidates ====
===== Declared =====
- Russell Best (Independent American)
- William Johnson (Independent)
- Gary Steele (Independent)

=== General election ===
==== Predictions ====
Source	Ranking	As of
Decision Desk HQ	Likely D	July 14, 2026
The Cook Political Report	Likely D	February 6, 2025
Inside Elections	Likely D	December 5, 2025
Sabato's Crystal Ball	Likely D	July 15, 2025
Silver Bulletin	Solid D	August 23, 2026

==== Post-primary endorsements ====
Cody Whipple (R)

Organizations

- Log Cabin Republicans

==== Fundraising ====
Campaign finance reports as of October 14, 2026
Candidate	Raised	Spent	Cash on hand
Steven Horsford (D)	$4,077,555	$3,262,013	$821,833
Cody Whipple (R)	$1,217,197	$1,150,817	$66,379
Source: Federal Election Commission

==== Results ====
2026 Nevada's 4th congressional district election
Party	Candidate	Votes	%	±%
Democratic	Steven Horsford (incumbent)	153,396	60.47	+7.81
Republican	Cody K. Whipple	95,401	37.61	−6.96
Independent American	Russell Best	2,570	1.01	N/A
Independent	William Johnson	2,308	0.91	N/A
Total votes		253,675	100.00	
Democratic hold		Swing	+7.39	

==== By county ====
County	Steven Horsford Democratic		Cody K. Whipple Republican		Various candidates Other parties		Margin		Total votes cast
County	#	%	#	%	#	%	#	%	Total votes cast
Churchill (part)	1	100.00%	0	0.00%	0	0.00%	1	100.00%	1
Clark (part)	145,507	63.79%	78,507	34.42%	4,092	1.79%	67,000	29.37%	228,106
Esmeralda	75	19.13%	300	76.53%	17	4.34%	-225	-57.40%	392
Lincoln	277	14.19%	1,604	82.17%	71	3.64%	-1,327	-67.98%	1,952
Lyon (part)	34	18.09%	151	80.32%	3	1.60%	-117	-62.23%	188
Mineral	610	35.99%	1,016	59.94%	69	4.07%	-406	-23.95%	1,695
Nye	6,892	32.29%	13,823	64.77%	626	2.93%	-6,931	-32.48%	21,341
Totals	153,396	60.47%	95,401	37.61%	4,878	1.92%	57,995	22.86%	253,675

== Notes ==
Partisan clients
