= 2026 Nevada elections =

- November 3, 2026

The 2026 Nevada elections were held in the U.S. state of Nevada on November 3, 2026, alongside the nationwide midterm elections. Elections were held for governor, lieutenant governor, attorney general, secretary of state, treasurer, and state controller as well as for all four seats in the House of Representatives, all 42 seats in the Nevada Assembly, 11 of 21 seats in the Nevada Senate, and other judicial and local elections. Primary elections were held on June 9, 2026.

Not included in this election are Nevada's two United States Senate seats, as they are currently held by Catherine Cortez Masto (term ends in 2028) and Jacky Rosen (term ends in 2030).

Candidate filing period are from March 2–13, 2026 for nonjudicial offices and January 5–16, 2026 for judicial offices.

== Partisan control ==
Nevada is a swing state and frequently elects a state government split between Republicans and Democrats. Between 1864 and 2024, Nevada has sent an equal number of Democrats and Republicans to the United States Senate and House of Representatives with 14 senators from each party and 20 representatives from each party.

Of the total 31 governors of Nevada, 15 have been Republicans and 12 have been Democrats, with two from the defunct Silver Party and one from its offshoot, the Silver Democrat Party. While the Nevada Senate has been controlled by Republicans 48 times and Democrats 28 times, the Nevada Assembly is the reverse, with a Democratic majority 50 times and Republican 26 times.

== United States House of Representatives ==
Democrats won all four of the seats in the United States House of Representatives.

In the 2nd district, Democrat Teresa Benitez-Thompson defeated Republican David Flippo, the first time a Democrat was elected to represent the district since its creation following the 1980 census.

All 4 of Nevada's seats in the United States House of Representatives were up for election in 2026. House members serve two year terms.

Following the 2024 U.S. House elections, three seats were held by Democrats, and one was held by a Republican, Mark Amodei. Incumbents include Dina Titus (1st district), Mark Amodei (2nd district), Susie Lee (3rd district), and Steven Horsford (4th district).

== State executive ==
=== Governor ===
Aaron Ford, a Democrat, defeated incumbent Republican Governor Joe Lombardo.

Incumbent Governor Joe Lombardo was first elected in 2022 with 48.8% of the vote.

Incumbent Attorney General Aaron Ford and Washoe County Commissioner Alexis Hill ran for the Democratic nomination.

=== Lieutenant governor ===
Democrat Sandra Jauregui defeated incumbent Republican Lieutenant Governor Stavros Anthony.

Anthony was first elected in 2022 with 49.4% of the vote. He ran for re-election. Assembly Majority Leader Sandra Jauregui ran in the Democratic primary.

=== Attorney general ===
Democrat Nicole Cannizzaro defeated Republican Adriana Guzmán Fralick.

Incumbent Democratic Attorney General Aaron Ford was re-elected in 2022 with 52.3% of the vote. Term-limited, he instead successfully ran for governor.

Senate Majority Leader Nicole Cannizzaro and Democratic State Treasurer Zach Conine ran for the Democratic nomination. Douglas County commissioner Danny Tarkanian and lawyer Adriana Guzmán Fralick ran for the Republican nomination.

=== Secretary of state ===
Incumbent Democratic Secretary of State Cisco Aguilar was first elected in 2022 with 49.0% of the vote. He successfully ran for a second term.

Former Assemblywoman Sharron Angle, who ran for United States Senate in 2010, ran for the Republican nomination.

=== State controller ===
Democrat Michael MacDougall defeated incumbent Republican Controller Andy Matthews.

Matthews was first elected in 2022 with 50.1% of the vote. He ran unsuccessfully for re-election.

=== State treasurer ===
Democrat Tya Mathis-Coleman defeated Republican Drew Johnson.

Incumbent Democratic Treasurer Zach Conine was re-elected in 2022 with 47.7% of the vote. Term limited, he instead ran unsuccessfully for attorney general.

Assemblyman Joe Dalia is running for the Democratic nomination. Drew Johnson, founder of the Tennessee Center for Policy Research, a conservative think tank, and nominee for Nevada's 3rd congressional district in 2024, is running for the Republican nomination.

== State legislature ==
=== State Senate ===
11 of 21 seats in the Nevada Senate were up for election in 2026. Following the 2024 elections, Democrats controlled 13 seats in the chamber, and Republicans controlled 8.

=== State Assembly ===
All 42 seats in the Nevada Assembly were up for election in 2026. Following the 2024 elections, Democrats controlled 27 seats in the chamber, and Republicans controlled 14, with one seat previously won by a Republican being vacant.

== Ballot measures ==
Two statewide ballot measures were voted on in the November 3 election, and both passed.

Question 6: Right to Abortion Initiative would provide for a constitutional right to abortion before fetal viability. In Nevada, constitutional amendments must be approved in two even-numbered election years; the initiative was approved in the 2024 election.

Question 7: Require Voter ID Initiative would require voters to present photo identification when voting in person or to provide the last four digits of their driver's license or Social Security number when voting by mail.
