= 2030 United States gubernatorial elections =

- November 5, 2030

39 governorships 36 states; 3 territories
	Majority party	Minority party
Party	Democratic	Republican
- Democratic incumbent Democratic incumbent term-limited Republican incumbent Republican incumbent term-limited TBD in 2026 TBD in 2028; No election

Gubernatorial elections will be held in the United States on November 5, 2030. These elections will take place in 36 states and three territories.

The previous gubernatorial elections for this group of states took place in 2026, except in New Hampshire and Vermont, where governors serve two-year terms and will elect their governors in 2028.

== Race summary ==
=== States ===
State	Governor	Party	First elected	Status	Candidates
Alabama	Tommy Tuberville	Republican	2026	Incumbent's intent unknown	TBD
Alaska	Jonathan Kreiss-Tomkins	Democratic	2026	Incumbent's intent unknown	TBD
Arizona	Katie Hobbs	Democratic	2022	Incumbent term-limited	TBD
Arkansas	Sarah Huckabee Sanders	Republican	2022	Incumbent term-limited	TBD
California	Xavier Becerra	Democratic	2026	Incumbent's intent unknown	TBD
Colorado	Phil Weiser	Democratic	2026	Incumbent's intent unknown	TBD
Connecticut	Ned Lamont	Democratic	2018	Incumbent's intent unknown	TBD
Florida	Byron Donalds	Republican	2026	Incumbent's intent unknown	TBD
Georgia	Keisha Lance Bottoms	Democratic	2026	Incumbent's intent unknown	TBD
Hawaii	Josh Green	Democratic	2022	Incumbent term-limited	TBD
Idaho	Brad Little	Republican	2018	Incumbent's intent unknown	TBD
Illinois	JB Pritzker	Democratic	2018	Incumbent's intent unknown	TBD
Iowa	Rob Sand	Democratic	2026	Incumbent's intent unknown	TBD
Kansas	Cindy Holscher	Democratic	2026	Incumbent's intent unknown	TBD
Maine	Hannah Pingree	Democratic	2026	Incumbent's intent unknown	TBD
Maryland	Wes Moore	Democratic	2022	Incumbent term-limited	TBD
Massachusetts	Maura Healey	Democratic	2022	Incumbent's intent unknown	TBD
Michigan	Jocelyn Benson	Democratic	2026	Incumbent's intent unknown	TBD
Minnesota	Amy Klobuchar	DFL	2026	Incumbent's intent unknown	TBD
Nebraska	Jim Pillen	Republican	2022	Incumbent term-limited	TBD
Nevada	Aaron Ford	Democratic	2026	Incumbent's intent unknown	TBD
New Hampshire	TBD in 2028				
New Mexico	Deb Haaland	Democratic	2026	Incumbent's intent unknown	TBD
New York	Kathy Hochul	Democratic	2021 (Note: Hochul took office after her predecessor, Andrew Cuomo, resigned. She was subsequently elected in 2022.)	Incumbent's intent unknown	TBD
Ohio	Amy Acton	Democratic	2026	Incumbent's intent unknown	TBD
Oklahoma	Mike Mazzei	Republican	2026	Incumbent's intent unknown	TBD
Oregon	Tina Kotek	Democratic	2022	Incumbent term-limited	TBD
Pennsylvania	Josh Shapiro	Democratic	2022	Incumbent term-limited	TBD
Rhode Island	Helena Foulkes	Democratic	2026	Incumbent's intent unknown	TBD
South Carolina	Alan Wilson	Republican	2026	Incumbent's intent unknown	TBD
South Dakota	Larry Rhoden	Republican	2025 (Note: Rhoden took office after his predecessor, Kristi Noem, resigned.)	Incumbent's intent unknown	TBD
Tennessee	Marsha Blackburn	Republican	2026	Incumbent's intent unknown	TBD
Texas	Gina Hinojosa	Democratic	2026	Incumbent's intent unknown	TBD
Vermont	TBD in 2028				
Wisconsin	David Crowley	Democratic	2026	Incumbent's intent unknown	TBD
Wyoming	Eric Barlow	Republican	2026	Incumbent's intent unknown	TBD

=== Territories and federal district ===
Territory	Governor	Party	First elected	Status	Candidates
District of Columbia	Janeese Lewis George	Democratic	2026	Incumbent's intent unknown	TBD
Guam	Vicente Ada	Republican	2026	Incumbent's intent unknown	TBD
Northern Mariana Islands	TBD in 2026				
U.S. Virgin Islands	Stacey Plaskett	Democratic	2026	Incumbent's intent unknown	TBD

== Alabama ==
Governor Tommy Tuberville was elected in 2026 with 52.0% of the vote. He is eligible to run for re-election but has not yet stated if he will do so.

== Alaska ==
Governor Jonathan Kreiss-Tomkins was elected in 2026 with 50.8% of the vote. He is eligible to run for re-election but has not yet stated if he will do so.

== Arizona ==
Governor Katie Hobbs was re-elected in 2026 with 55.7% of the vote. She is ineligible to run for re-election to a third term, as the state prohibits governors from serving a more than two consecutive terms.

== Arkansas ==
Governor Sarah Huckabee Sanders was re-elected in 2026 with 53.9% of the vote. She is ineligible to run for re-election to a third term, as the state prohibits governors from serving more than two terms.

== California ==
Governor Xavier Becerra was elected in 2026 with 65.6% of the vote. He is eligible to run for re-election but has not yet stated if he will do so.

== Colorado ==
Governor Phil Weiser was elected in 2026 with 61.1% of the vote. He is eligible to run for re-election but has not yet stated if he will do so.

== Connecticut ==
Governor Ned Lamont was elected in 2026 with 59.6% of the vote. He is eligible to run for re-election but has not yet stated if he will do so.

== Florida ==
Governor Byron Donalds was elected in 2026 with 50.0% of the vote. He is eligible to run for re-election but has not yet stated if he will do so. Democrat David Jolly is considering a bid.

== Georgia ==
Governor Keisha Lance Bottoms was elected in 2026 with 54.3% of the vote. She is eligible to run for re-election but has not yet stated if she will do so.

== Hawaii ==
Governor Josh Green was re-elected in 2026 with 72.64% of the vote. He is ineligible to run for re-election to a third term, as the state prohibits governors from serving more than two consecutive terms.

== Idaho ==
Governor Brad Little was re-elected in 2026 with 57.1% of the vote. He is eligible to run for re-election but has not yet stated if he will do so.

== Illinois ==
Governor JB Pritzker was re-elected in 2026 with 60.1% of the vote. He is eligible to run for re-election but has not yet stated if he will do so.

== Iowa ==
Governor Rob Sands was elected in 2026 with 55.5% of the vote. He is eligible to run for re-election but has not yet stated if he will do so.

== Kansas ==
Governor Cindy Holscher was elected in 2026 with 50.3% of the vote. She is eligible to run for re-election but has not yet stated if she will do so.

== Maine ==
Governor Hannah Pingree was elected in 2026 with 54.5% of the vote. He is eligible to run for re-election but has not yet stated if she will do so.

== Maryland ==
Governor Wes Moore was re-elected in 2026 with 65.3% of the vote. He is ineligible to run for re-election to a third term, as the state prohibits governors from serving more than two consecutive terms.

== Massachusetts ==
Governor Maura Healey was re-elected in 2026 with 62.0% of the vote. She is eligible to run for re-election but has not yet stated if she will do so.

== Michigan ==
Governor Jocelyn Benson was elected in 2026 with 54.6% of the vote. She is eligible to run for re-election but has not yet stated if she will do so.

== Minnesota ==
Governor Amy Klobuchar was elected in 2026 with 55.5% of the vote. She is eligible to run for re-election but has not yet stated if she will do so.

== Nebraska ==
Governor Jim Pillen was re-elected in 2026 with 50.5% of the vote. He is ineligible to run for re-election to a third term, as the state prohibits governors from serving more than two consecutive terms.

== Nevada ==
Governor Aaron Ford was elected in 2026 with 51.6% of the vote. He is eligible for re-election but has not yet stated if he will do so.

== New Mexico ==
Governor Deb Haaland was re-elected in 2026 with 57.4% of the vote. She is eligible for re-election but has not yet stated if she will do so.

== New York ==
Governor Kathy Hochul was re-elected in 2026 with 59.6% of the vote. She is eligible to run for re-election but has not yet stated if she will do so. Republican Mike Lawler is listed as a potential candidate.

== Ohio ==
Governor Amy Acton was elected in 2026 with 52.3% of the vote. She is eligible to run for re-election but has not yet stated if she will do so. Republican Jon Husted is listed as a potential candidate.

== Oklahoma ==
Governor Mike Mazzei was elected in 2026 with 51.9% of the vote. He is eligible for re-election but has not yet stated if he will do so.

== Oregon ==
Governor Tina Kotek was re-elected in 2026 with 53.3% of the vote. She is ineligible for re-election to a third term, as the state prohibits governors from serving more than two consecutive terms.

== Pennsylvania ==
Governor Josh Shapiro was re-elected in 2026 with 60.4% of the vote. He is ineligible for re-election to a third term, as the state prohibits governors from serving more than two consecutive terms.

== Rhode Island ==
Governor Helena Foulkes was elected in 2026 with 57.7% of the vote. She is eligible for re-election but has not yet stated if she will do so.

== South Carolina ==
Governor Alan Wilson was elected in 2026 with 51.6% of the vote. He is eligible for re-election but has not yet stated if he will do so.

== South Dakota ==
Governor Larry Rhoden was elected in 2026 with 63.49% of the vote. He is eligible for re-election but has not yet stated if he will do so.

== Tennessee ==
Governor Marsha Blackburn was elected in 2026 with 45.5% of the vote. She is eligible to run for re-election but has not yet stated if she will do so. Democrat Jerri Green is listed as a potential candidate.

== Texas ==
Governor Gina Hinojosa was elected in 2026 with 52.8% of the vote. She is eligible for re-election but has not yet stated if she will do so.

== Wisconsin ==
Governor David Crowley was elected in 2026 with 54.0% of the vote. He is eligible for re-election but has not yet stated if he will do so.

== Wyoming ==
Governor Eric Barlow was elected in 2026 with 68.12% of the vote. He is eligible for re-election but has not yet stated if he will do so.
