= Tya Mathis-Coleman =

American politician

Treasurer of Nevada
- Elect
- Assuming office January 2027
- Governor: Aaron Ford (elect)
- Succeeding: Zach Conine

Personal details
- Born: 1981 or 1982 (age 44–45)
- Party: Democratic
- Education: University of Nevada, Reno (BA, MPA); University of Nevada, Las Vegas (DPA)

Tya Mathis-Coleman (born 1981 or 1982) is an American politician from Nevada. A member of the Democratic Party, she is the Nevada State Treasurer-elect.

Mathis-Coleman graduated from the University of Nevada, Reno with a bachelor's degree in political science and then earned a Master of Public Administration from the school while working for it as an admissions coordinator. She then worked in recruitment for the Clark County School District.

Mathis-Coleman works in the office of the Nevada State Treasurer. She ran for state treasurer in the 2026 election and won, becoming the first Black woman to be elected to statewide office in Nevada.

Political offices
Preceded by Zach Conine	Treasurer of Nevada; Taking office 2027	Elect
