= Michael Pariente =

American attorney

- Education: University of New Mexico; University of Texas at Austin; Baylor Law School
- Occupation: Trial Attorney
- Website: parientelaw.com

Michael Pariente is an American criminal defense attorney and the founder of Pariente Law Firm. He has been lead counsel in several high-profile cases, including Andersen v. Eighth Judicial District Court, which entitled every defendant charged with misdemeanor domestic battery to a jury trial in the State of Nevada. The case has been called "the most significant Nevada Supreme Court case of the 21st century."

== Background ==
Pariente graduated with a degree in Business Administration at the University of New Mexico in 1990 and received a master's degree in Public Affairs from the University of Texas at Austin in 1995. He received his J.D. degree from Baylor Law School in 1998. Pariente is admitted to practice law in the State of Nevada and the State of Texas. He previously served as an Assistant District Attorney for DUI prosecutions and as an Assistant Federal Public Defender in El Paso, Texas.

Pariente is the son of Esther Pariente-Ahmed and electrical engineer and computer scientist Nasir Ahmed.

== Noteworthy cases ==
=== Andersen v. Eighth Judicial District Court ===
In 2019, Pariente successfully litigated what has been called "the most significant Nevada Supreme Court case of the 21st century."

In Andersen v. Eighth Judicial District Court, the defendant was charged with battery which constitutes domestic violence, a first offense, and was set to stand trial in the Las Vegas Municipal Court. He asked for a jury trial, but in accordance with longstanding Nevada law, was told he was not entitled to a jury for a misdemeanor charge. He pled no contest and was found guilty, and appealed his conviction based on the fact that he was denied his right to a jury.

The case eventually made it to the Nevada Supreme Court. Pariente argued that a defendant charged with battery constituting domestic violence has a Sixth Amendment right to a jury trial because a defendant loses his or her Second Amendment right upon conviction of the offense by letting a judge, and not a jury, decide guilt or innocence. The Court reversed the defendant's conviction, and declared that henceforth, for the first time since Nevada became a state in 1864, every defendant charged with misdemeanor domestic battery is entitled to a jury trial.

"The Nevada Supreme Court’s Sept. 12 decision held that misdemeanor domestic violence defendants are entitled to a jury trial because of a 2017 law banning those convicted of the crime from owning guns. The ban on gun ownership elevated the crime from a petty offense that doesn’t entitle a defendant to a jury to a more serious offense with jury rights, the court said."

== Aftermath of Andersen ==
Following the Nevada Supreme Court's decision in Andersen v. Eighth Judicial District Court, many cities, including the city of Las Vegas, have fought to undermine the verdict. Pariente has been critical of Las Vegas City Council and its efforts to bypass the verdict by enacting its own ordinance which circumvents the law created by the Nevada Supreme Court in Andersen. Pariente has publicly called the ordinance "absurd, pathetic and desperate" and has vowed to take the matter to the Nevada Supreme Court or the Supreme Court of the United States, if necessary.”

== Publications ==
In June 2022, the State Bar of Nevada published an article in its Nevada Lawyer Magazine written by Pariente entitled “The Impact of the Andersen Decision on Firearm Laws in Nevada.”

== See also ==
- Andersen v. Eighth Judicial District Court
