= 2022 Nevada Attorney General election =

- November 8, 2022
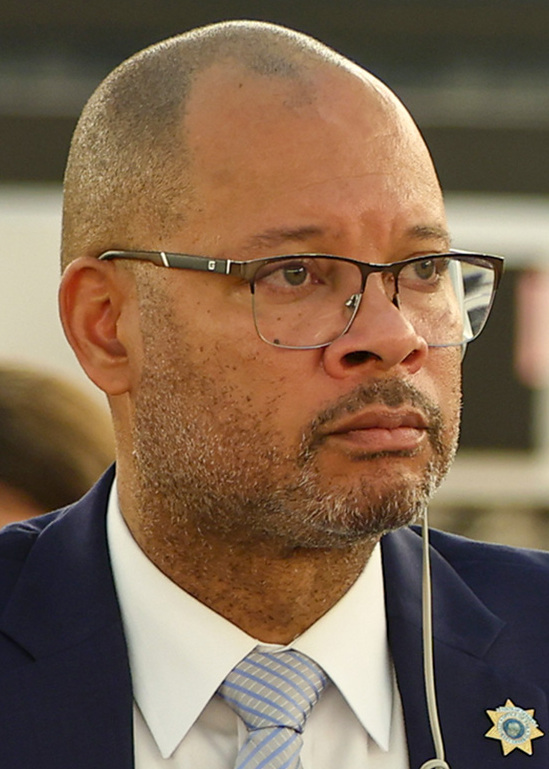

Nominee	Aaron Ford	Sigal Chattah
Party	Democratic	Republican
Popular vote	511,263	434,084
Percentage	52.25%	44.36%
- Ford: 40–50% 50–60% 60–70% 70–80% 80–90% >90% Chattah: 40–50% 50–60% 60–70% 70–80% 80–90% >90% Tie: 40–50% 50% No votes
Attorney General before election
Aaron Ford
Democratic
Elected Attorney General
Aaron Ford
Democratic

The 2022 Nevada Attorney General election took place on November 8, 2022, to elect the Attorney General of Nevada. Incumbent Democratic Attorney General Aaron Ford won re-election to a second term in office. As Ford narrowly won Carson City, this was the first time since 2014 that a Democrat had won a county or county-equivalent outside of Clark or Washoe County. Ford's performance was also the best for a Nevada Democrat in a statewide race in 2022, as all other successful Democratic candidates for statewide races won with pluralities of the vote.

== Democratic primary ==
=== Candidates ===
==== Nominee ====
- Aaron Ford, incumbent attorney general

==== Disqualified ====
- Stuart MacKie, attorney and candidate for Governor of Nevada in 2018

=== Endorsements ===
Aaron Ford

Organizations

- Brady PAC
- End Citizens United
- Giffords
- Human Rights Campaign
- NARAL
- Planned Parenthood Votes Nevada

Newspapers

- Las Vegas Sun
- Las Vegas Weekly

Labor unions

- Nevada AFL–CIO
- United Auto Workers

== Republican primary ==
=== Candidates ===
==== Nominee ====
- Sigal Chattah, defense attorney and former member of the Southern Nevada Disciplinary Board of the State Bar of Nevada

==== Eliminated in primary ====
- Tisha Black, attorney and former president of the Nevada Cannabis Association

=== Debate ===
2022 Nevada Attorney General Republican primary debate
No.	Date	Host	Moderator	Link	Republican	Republican
Key: P Participant A Absent N Not invited I Invited W Withdrawn						
Key: P Participant A Absent N Not invited I Invited W Withdrawn					Sigal Chattah	Tisha Black
1	May 5, 2022	Nevada Newsmakers	Victor Joecks; Sam Shad		P	P

=== Polling ===
Poll source	Date(s) administered	Sample size (Note: Key: A – all adults RV – registered voters LV – likely voters V – unclear)	Margin of error	Tisha Black	Sigal Chattah	None of These Candidates	Undecided
OH Predictive Insights	May 10–12, 2022	500 (LV)	± 4.4%	18%	15%	29%	37%

=== Results ===
Results by county: Chattah: 40–50%; 50–60%; Black: 40–50%

Republican primary results
Party	Candidate	Votes	%
Republican	Sigal Chattah	112,941	50.99%
Republican	Tisha Black	88,019	39.74%
None of These Candidates		20,545	9.28%
Total votes		221,505	100.0%

== Libertarian primary ==
John Kennedy was disqualified from running after he did not meet the requirement for candidates to be members of the State Bar of Nevada. As he was disqualified after general election ballots had already been printed, he remained on the ballot, but any votes he received did not count.

=== Candidates ===
==== Declared ====
- John T. Kennedy

== General election ==
=== Post-primary endorsements ===
Aaron Ford (D)

U.S. Representatives

- Jon Porter, NV-03 (2003–2009) (Republican)

State officials

- Michael Roberson, former State Senate Minority Leader and Republican nominee for lieutenant governor in 2018 (Republican)

Individuals

- Herb Santos, attorney (Republican)
- Jodi Stephens, caucus director for the Nevada State Senate (Republican)
- Amy Tarkanian, former Nevada Republican Party chair and wife of Danny Tarkanian (Republican)

Organizations

- Let America Vote

Newspapers

- Las Vegas Review-Journal

=== Predictions ===
Source	Ranking	As of
Sabato's Crystal Ball	Tossup	November 3, 2022
Elections Daily	Leans D	November 7, 2022

=== Polling ===
Poll source	Date(s) administered	Sample size	Margin of error	Aaron Ford (D)	Sigal Chattah (R)	None of These Candidates	Other	Undecided
Emerson College	October 26–29, 2022	2,000 (LV)	± 2.1%	45%	40%	–	–	6%
OH Predictive Insights	October 24–27, 2022	600 (LV)	± 4.0%	43%	35%	3%	5% (Note: Kennedy (L) with 4%; "Refused" with 1%)	15%
Susquehanna Polling and Research (R) (Note: Poll conducted for BUSR, an online gambling website.)	October 24–27, 2022	500 (LV)	± 4.3%	44%	41%	1%	10% (Note: Kennedy (L) with 9%; "Refuse" with 1%)	4%
University of Nevada, Reno	October 5–19, 2022	576 (LV)	± 4.0%	37%	25%	–	5% (Note: "Some other candidate" with 5%)	32%
OH Predictive Insights	September 20–29, 2022	741 (LV)	± 3.6%	37%	39%	3%	4% (Note: Kennedy (L) with 4%)	17%
Suffolk University	August 14–17, 2022	500 (LV)	± 4.4%	33%	28%	4%	12% (Note: Kennedy (L) with 12%)	23%

=== Results ===
2022 Nevada Attorney General election
Party	Candidate	Votes	%	±%
Democratic	Aaron Ford (incumbent)	511,263	52.25	+5.01
Republican	Sigal Chattah	434,084	44.36	−2.41
None of These Candidates		33,135	3.39	+0.74
Total votes		978,482	100.00	N/A
Democratic hold				

==== By county ====
County	Aaron D. Ford Democratic		Sigal Chattah Republican		None of These Candidates		Margin		Total votes cast
County	#	%	#	%	#	%	#	%	Total votes cast
Carson City	11,164	49.61%	10,335	45.92%	1,006	4.47%	829	3.68%	22,505
Churchill	2,874	31.00%	5,839	62.98%	558	6.02%	−2,965	−31.98%	9,271
Clark	362,005	55.15%	274,986	41.89%	19,387	2.95%	87,019	13.26%	656,378
Douglas	10,276	36.78%	16,432	58.82%	1,228	4.40%	−6,156	−22.04%	27,936
Elko	3,288	21.40%	11,506	74.89%	570	3.71%	−8,218	−53.49%	15,364
Esmeralda	77	18.69%	302	73.30%	33	8.01%	−225	−54.61%	412
Eureka	87	11.74%	604	81.51%	50	6.75%	−517	−69.77%	741
Humboldt	1,600	27.95%	3,754	65.58%	370	6.46%	−2,154	−37.63%	5,724
Lander	477	23.16%	1,462	70.97%	121	5.87%	−985	−47.82%	2,060
Lincoln	375	18.30%	1,536	74.96%	138	6.73%	−1,161	−56.66%	2,049
Lyon	7,160	32.48%	13,709	62.18%	1,178	5.34%	−6,549	−29.70%	22,047
Mineral	730	41.41%	905	51.33%	128	7.26%	−175	−9.93%	1,763
Nye	6,409	32.57%	12,284	62.43%	983	5.00%	−5,875	−29.86%	19,676
Pershing	509	30.48%	1,049	62.81%	112	6.71%	−540	−32.34%	1,670
Storey	812	33.69%	1,491	61.87%	107	4.44%	−679	−28.17%	2,410
Washoe	102,670	55.43%	75,529	40.78%	7,021	3.79%	27,141	14.65%	185,220
White Pine	750	23.03%	2,361	72.51%	145	4.45%	−1,611	−49.48%	3,256
Totals	511,263	52.25%	434,084	44.36%	33,135	3.39%	77,179	7.89%	978,482

Counties and independent cities that flipped from Republican to Democratic

- Carson City
- Washoe (largest municipality: Reno)

==== By congressional district ====
Ford won three of four congressional districts.

District	Ford	Chattah	Representative
1st	55%	42%	Dina Titus
2nd	47.5%	48.3%	Mark Amodei
3rd	54%	43%	Susie Lee
4th	54%	43%	Steven Horsford

== See also ==
- Nevada Attorney General
