= Sigal Chattah =

Israeli-born American attorney and politician (born 1975)

- Chattah in 2026

United States Attorney for the District of Nevada
- De facto (Note: In September 2025, judge David G. Campbell ruled that Chattah was "not validly serving" as the interim United States attorney, but later paused his ruling.)
- Assumed office April 1, 2025; Interim: April 1, 2025 – July 29, 2025
- Appointed by: Donald Trump
- Preceded by: Jason Frierson; Sue Fahami (acting)

Republican National Committeewoman from Nevada
- In office January 16, 2023 – August 2025
- Preceded by: Michele Fiore
- Succeeded by: Sue Lowden

Personal details
- Born: April 24, 1975 (age 51) Israel
- Party: Republican
- Education: Widener University School of Law (JD); University of Nevada, Las Vegas (BS)

Sigal Chattah (Hebrew: סיגל שאטה; born April 24, 1975) is an Israeli-born American attorney and politician currently serving as the interim United States attorney for the District of Nevada since 2025.

Previously, Chattah was an attorney known for leading legal efforts for churches during the COVID-19 pandemic in Nevada. Chattah's tenure as interim United States Attorney has been extended through personnel changes that have since been ruled illegal, although that ruling has been paused and taken to the United States Court of Appeals for the Ninth Circuit.

Chattah was the Republican nominee in the 2022 Nevada Attorney General election, losing to incumbent Democrat Aaron D. Ford.

== Early life and education ==
Chattah was born on April 24, 1975, in Israel and emigrated to the United States with her parents at the age of fourteen. The family initially settled in New York but temporarily returned to Israel before relocating to Las Vegas, Nevada. Chattah graduated from Valley High School and later earned a Bachelor of Science degree in political science from the University of Nevada, Las Vegas. She later attended the Widener University School of Law and Webster University Geneva.

== Career ==
=== Early career ===
In 2002, Chattah opened her own law firm in Las Vegas, where she practices domestic and international law. She also taught political science at the University of Nevada, Las Vegas, from 2005 to 2009. In July 2019, the Las Vegas City Council unanimously ratified Chattah's appointment to the Las Vegas Planning Commission, where she served for four years representing Ward 2. She also served on the Southern Nevada Disciplinary Board of the State Bar of Nevada.

During the COVID-19 pandemic in Nevada, Chattah represented churches in challenging the state's 50-person occupancy limit during lockdowns and filing an emergency petition for a preliminary injunction, requesting a judge to declare that Governor of Nevada Steve Sisolak's orders violated constitutional rights.

=== Nevada Attorney General campaign and RNC ===
In March 2021, Chattah announced that she would run for Nevada Attorney General in the 2022 election, challenging incumbent Democrat Aaron D. Ford. She stated that her decision was motivated by her belief that the state's pandemic restrictions and shutdowns were unconstitutional. Chattah ran against Tisha Black, a business attorney based in Las Vegas, in the Republican primary. During the campaign, Chattah criticized Black for having previously donated to then-Clark County Commissioner Steve Sisolak, a Democrat. She won against Black in the Republican primary.

In January 2022, journalist Sarah Ashton-Cirillo leaked text messages in which Chattah compared incumbent Ford to the leader of Hamas and stated that he "should be hanging from a fucking crane," which drew widespread criticism and were condemned as inappropriate. She stated that she did not believe Chattah was racist or that the comments were intended to reference Ford's race, but said her reason for releasing the messages was to raise concerns about Chattah's temperament. Because of the leak, Ford refused to debate Chattah during the election, stating that he would not debate someone who "didn't respect [his] dignity as a human or [his] humanity." Ford defeated Chattah in the general election, with HuffPost highlighting the leaked texts as a significant issue during the campaign.

In December 2022, Chattah and retired attorney Pauline Ng Lee ran for a seat on the Republican National Committee, seeking to fill the vacancy left by Michele Fiore. Chattah received endorsements from national figures such as Matt Gaetz and Richard Grenell. She was elected to the Republican National Committee seat in January 2023, defeating Lee by 75 votes.

=== United States attorney ===
Chattah (right) with U.S. Deputy Secretary of Homeland Security Troy Edgar in July 2026

In March 2025, President Donald Trump announced the appointment of Sigal Chattah as the interim United States Attorney for the District of Nevada. U.S. Senator Catherine Cortez Masto referred to Chattah as an "election denier who has advocated for political violence," while Senator Jacky Rosen stated that she would do "everything in [her] power to block her confirmation." She took office as interim attorney on April 1, 2025. She continued to be listed as a Republican National Committee committeewoman and was introduced virtually at a Nevada Republican Party meeting on April 5, with her participation prompting concerns by The Nevada Independent about a possible violation of U.S. Department of Justice rules prohibiting political activity by its employees.

On July 29, 2025, a group of 116 former federal and state judges, nominated by presidents of both parties, wrote a letter calling for the court to not permanently appoint Chattah. The letter described Chattah as having "extreme partisan bias" and a history of racially charged comments.

In July 2025, Trump extended Chattah's term as interim U.S. Attorney for an additional 210 days, before her 120-day term was set to expire. Masto and Rosen have said they would block her nomination using Senate rules. Trump's extension of Chattah's term prevented a federal court from rejecting her permanent appointment or appointing a new U.S. attorney.

On September 30, 2025, U.S. District Judge David G. Campbell ruled that Chattah was not validly serving as acting United States Attorney for the District of Nevada and disqualified her from participating in or supervising four federal criminal cases, writing that her involvement "would be unlawful." The court concluded that after her 120-day interim term expired in July, subsequent personnel moves used to keep her in the role violated federal vacancies law. Campbell left the indictments in place but ordered the line prosecutors to certify that Chattah was not directing their work. On October 23, Campbell paused his previous ruling, saying that he stood by his decision, but cited "the deference and respect [the court] should have for the Executive Branch." The October decision allowed Chattah to participate in the four indictments from which she had previously been blocked. On February 12, 2026, the U.S. Ninth Circuit Court of Appeals held a hearing on the legality of Chattah's appointment. The Trump administration has nominated George Kelesis to replace Chattah, but the hearing would determine if Chattah could remain in her position for the duration of the nomination process, as well as if prosecutions during her tenure are valid. Chattah's 210-day tenure was set to expire in February. By June 2026, Kelesis had not submitted the necessary paperwork for the Senate to consider confirming him, and Chattah has said that she intends on remaining in office.

In June 2026, Bloomberg Law reported that Chattah had used her office to launch investigations on behalf of friends and former clients, and had disregarded Department of Justice orders to recuse herself from cases in which she had conflicts of interest. Examples include her directing an attorney to settle a case in which the defendant was represented by a friend of Chattah, and firing an assistant US attorney representing the federal government in a lawsuit by Chattah's former political consultant and donor to her 2022 campaign. Chattah has also sought status updates on an investigation into a Republican county commissioner, despite the DOJ ordering her recusal. The Boolberg Law report was supported by Devlin Barrett of The New York Times in his 2026 book titled The Department of Revenge: How Trump Took control of American Justice.

==== Tom Alexandrovich ====
In August 2025 following a child sex predator sting operation, Tom Alexandrovich, a senior Israeli government official, was arrested, accused of soliciting sexual acts from a minor in Chattah's jurisdiction; he was released on bail and returned to Israel. Chattah wrote a post on X blaming "a liberal district attorney and state court judge" for not confiscating Alexandrovich's passport. Clark County District Attorney Steve Wolfson, to whom Chattah's X post referred, disputed Chattah's post as "a rant with false claims" and challenged her fitness to serve. Following the controversy, Axios reported that some criticism of Chattah, such as by Candace Owens, included references to her Israeli origin.

==== Federal election fraud probe ====
On September 30, 2025, Reuters reported that Chattah had asked the FBI to investigate claims of voter fraud in the 2020 presidential election, giving federal agents a thumb drive containing data compiled by the Nevada Republican Party about illegal votes in the 2020 election by undocumented immigrants and members of Native American tribes being paid to vote. Chattah also expressed her intent to exonerate six Republicans who were prosecuted for posing as fake electors to claim that Donald Trump won the 2020 United States presidential election in Nevada. Chattah had defended one of the accused, but withdrew from the case after being appointed Interim U.S. Attorney. Legal experts have raised concerns that Chattah may have violated government ethics rules due to her previous work as an attorney.

==== Ori Solomon ====
Chattah is overseeing the case of Israeli and French dual national Ori Solomon, who was charged with not disposing of hazardous waste properly and illegal possession of a firearm in February 2026. Solomon was arrested following an investigation into a bio laboratory at a home in Las Vegas, where investigators seized "numerous firearms, ammunition, and firearm accessories". Solomon was the property manager of the home. In May 2026, the federal gun charges against Solomon were dropped.

==== Political views and opinions ====
Chattah has a history of controversial remarks regarding Palestinians, including referring to them as "animals," calling for wiping Gaza "off the map," and suggesting that "even the children" in the enclave are "terrorists."

She also called U.S. Representative Jamaal Bowman an "antisemitic ghetto rat". In defense, she claims that she is not racist and that, while in office, she upholds a decorum that is not necessarily present in her private conversations. In reference to being called "extremist" by US senators Catherine Cortez Masto and Jacky Rosen she claimed that she does not think she is extremist and that "there is no extremist bone in her body."
