= 2026 Nevada State Treasurer election =

- November 3, 2026

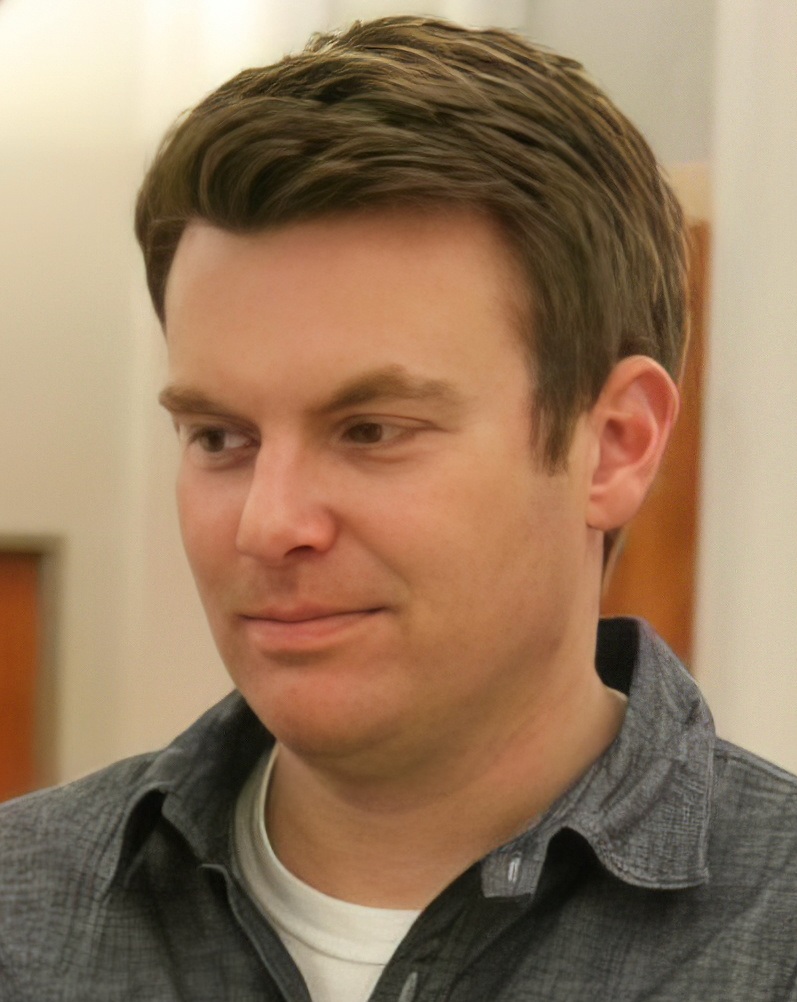
Nominee	Tya Mathis-Coleman	Drew Johnson
Party	Democratic	Republican
Popular vote	593,159	461,578
Percentage	55.1%	42.9%
State Treasurer before election
Zach Conine
Democratic
Elected State Treasurer
Tya Mathis-Coleman
Democratic

The 2026 Nevada State Treasurer election was held on November 3, 2026, to elect the Nevada State Treasurer. Incumbent Democratic Treasurer Zach Conine was term-limited and instead ran for attorney general.

== Democratic primary ==
=== Candidates ===
==== Nominee ====
- Tya Mathis-Coleman, deputy treasurer

==== Eliminated in primary ====
- Joe Dalia, state assemblymember from the 29th district (2024–present)
- Jay Maharjan, educator

=== Endorsements ===
Joe Dalia

State legislators

- Nicole Cannizzaro, majority leader of the Nevada Senate (2019–present) from SD-06 (2016–present)
Tya Mathis-Coleman

Statewide officials

- Zach Conine, Nevada State Treasurer (2019–present)

Labor unions

- Nevada AFL-CIO

Organizations

- Progressive Leadership Alliance of Nevada Action

=== Results ===
Primary results by county: Mathis-Coleman: 30–40%; 40–50%; 50–60%; Dalia: 30–40%; 40–50%; None of These Candidates: 30–40%; Tie: 30–40%

Democratic primary results
Party	Candidate	Votes	%
Democratic	Tya Mathis-Coleman	101,211	55.2
Democratic	Joe Dalia	56,168	30.6
Democratic	Jay Maharjan	14,964	8.2
None of These Candidates		10,997	6.0
Total votes		183,340	100.0

== Republican primary ==
=== Candidates ===
==== Nominee ====
- Drew Johnson, founder of the Tennessee Center for Policy Research and nominee for Nevada's 3rd congressional district in 2024

==== Eliminated in primary ====
- Jeff Carter, former Chicago Mercantile Exchange trader

=== Results ===
Primary results by county: Johnson: 30–40%; 40–50%; 50–60%; Carter: 40–50%; 50–60%

Republican primary results
Party	Candidate	Votes	%
Republican	Drew Johnson	80,831	45.5
Republican	Jeff Carter	78,105	43.9
None of These Candidates		18,829	10.6
Total votes		177,765	100.0

== General election ==
=== Post-primary endorsements ===
Drew Johnson (R)

Newspapers

- Las Vegas Review-Journal
Tya Mathis-Coleman (D)

Newspapers

- Las Vegas Sun

=== Polling ===
Poll source	Date(s) administered	Sample size (Note: Key: A – all adults RV – registered voters LV – likely voters V – unclear)	Margin of error	Tya Mathis-Coleman (D)	Drew Johnson (R)	Other	Undecided
Noble Predictive Insights	September 22–26, 2026	800 (RV)	± 3.5%	37%	33%	7% (Note: "None of these candidates" with 4%; "Another candidate" with 3%)	23%
Noble Predictive Insights	September 22–26, 2026	708 (LV)	± 3.7%	40%	39%	5% (Note: "None of these candidates" with 3%; "Another candidate" with 2%)	15%

=== Results ===
2026 Nevada State Treasurer election
Party	Candidate	Votes	%	±%
Democratic	Tya Mathis-Coleman			
Republican	Drew Johnson			
None of These Candidates				
Total votes			100.0	
Democratic hold				
