= Andersen v. Eighth Judicial District Court =

Andersen v. Eighth Judicial District Court, 135 Nev. Adv. Op. 42 (2019), was a landmark decision of the Nevada Supreme Court in which the Court entitled every defendant charged with misdemeanor domestic battery to a jury trial in the State of Nevada. The case has been called "the most significant Nevada Supreme Court case of the 21st century."

== Background ==
In Andersen v. Eighth Judicial District Court, the defendant was charged with battery which constitutes domestic violence, a first offense, and was set to stand trial in the Las Vegas Municipal Court. He asked for a jury trial, but in accordance with longstanding Nevada law, was told he was not entitled to a jury for a misdemeanor charge. He pled no contest and was found guilty, and appealed his conviction based on the fact that he was denied his right to a jury.

== Decision ==
The case eventually made it to the Nevada Supreme Court. Andersen's attorney Michael Pariente argued that a defendant charged with battery constituting domestic violence has a Sixth Amendment right to a jury trial because a defendant loses his or her Second Amendment right upon conviction of the offense by letting a judge, and not a jury, decide guilt or innocence. The Court reversed the defendant's conviction, and declared that henceforth, for the first time since Nevada became a state in 1864, every defendant charged with misdemeanor domestic battery is entitled to a jury trial.

"The Nevada Supreme Court's Sept. 12 decision held that misdemeanor domestic violence defendants are entitled to a jury trial because of a 2017 law banning those convicted of the crime from owning guns. The ban on gun ownership elevated the crime from a petty offense that doesn't entitle a defendant to a jury to a more serious offense with jury rights, the court said."
