= Alexis Hill (Nevada politician) =

American public administrator and politician

Chair of Washoe County Commission
- Incumbent
- Assumed office 2023
- Preceded by: Bob Hartung

Member of Washoe County Commission
- Incumbent
- Assumed office 2021
- Preceded by: Marsha Berkbigler

Personal details
- Born: Sparks, Nevada, U.S.
- Party: Democratic
- Education: Texas A&M University (BA); University of Nevada, Reno (MPA)

Alexis Hill is an American public administrator and politician currently serving as the chair of the Washoe County, Nevada Commission. A member of the Democratic Party, Hill was first elected to the Washoe County Commission in 2020 and represents District 1 and became chair of the commission in 2023.

In 2025, she announced her candidacy for governor of Nevada to unseat the incumbent Republican governor Joe Lombardo, but lost in the Democratic primary to attorney general Aaron Ford.

== Early life and education ==
Hill was born in Sparks, Nevada. Before holding elective office, she worked in public policy, city planning, and nonprofit roles in the Sparks–Reno region. She has a bachelor’s degree in political science from Texas A&M University and a graduate degree in public administration and policy from the University of Nevada, Reno.

== Washoe County Commission ==
In 2020, Hill was elected to the Washoe County Board of Commissioners, defeating former Republican Commissioner Marsha Berkbigler. In the 2024 election, she won re-election by approximately 15 percentage points over the same opponent.

In 2023, the commission selected her as chair.

In May 2023, local reporting asserted that Hill’s decision to eliminate general public comment at the start of meetings was lawful under state law.

On land-use and Tahoe policy, Hill has supported adoption of Tahoe Regional Planning Agency code changes that allow higher density development, which has drawn litigation from residents citing safety and environmental concerns.

=== 2024 election certification dispute ===
In July 2024, the Washoe County Commission voted 3–2 against certifying the results of a Republican primary recount, an action that temporarily left the county in violation of Nevada law requiring certification of all election results. Hill and fellow Democratic commissioner Mariluz Garcia voted in favor of certification, while three Republican commissioners opposed it. After state officials warned that failure to certify could trigger court action, two Republicans switched their votes, and the board ultimately certified the recount results several days later receiving national attention.

== 2026 gubernatorial election ==
In July 2025, Hill announced her intention to run in the 2026 election for Nevada governor as a Democratic candidate. Her platform included tax reform, including changes to property tax and ending certain corporate tax incentives, temporary rent caps, infrastructure investment, and continued focus on housing affordability.

On June 9, the Associated Press called the primary election in favor of Aaron Ford, with Hill conceding the same day. Hill came second in the primary, receiving 23.9% of the vote compared to Ford's 63.3%.

== Personal life ==
Hill resides in the Old Southwest neighborhood of Reno with her husband and daughter.

== Electoral history ==
=== 2026 ===
Results by county: Ford: 40–50%; 50–60%; 60-70%; Tie: 30–40%

Democratic primary results
Party	Candidate	Votes	%
Democratic	Aaron Ford	105,150	63.8
Democratic	Alexis Hill	37,886	23.0
None of These Candidates		6,874	4.2
Democratic	James Cooper	6,020	3.7
Democratic	Sunshine Arterburn	4,513	2.7
Democratic	Emile Bouari	2,585	1.6
Democratic	Miqehl Bayfield	1,869	1.1
Total votes		164,897	100.0

=== 2024 ===
2024 Washoe County Commission, district 1
Party	Candidate	Votes	%	±%
Democratic	Alexis Hill	31,414	57.3%	
Republican	Marsha Berkbigler	23,411	42.7%	
Total votes		54,825	100.0%	

=== 2020 ===
2020 Washoe County Commission, district 1
Party	Candidate	Votes	%	±%
Democratic	Alexis Hill	29,149	55.12%	
Republican	Marsha Berkbigler	23,738	44.9%	
Total votes		52,887	100.0%	

== See also ==
- Washoe County, Nevada
- List of people from Nevada
