= 2026 Nevada gubernatorial election =

- November 3, 2026
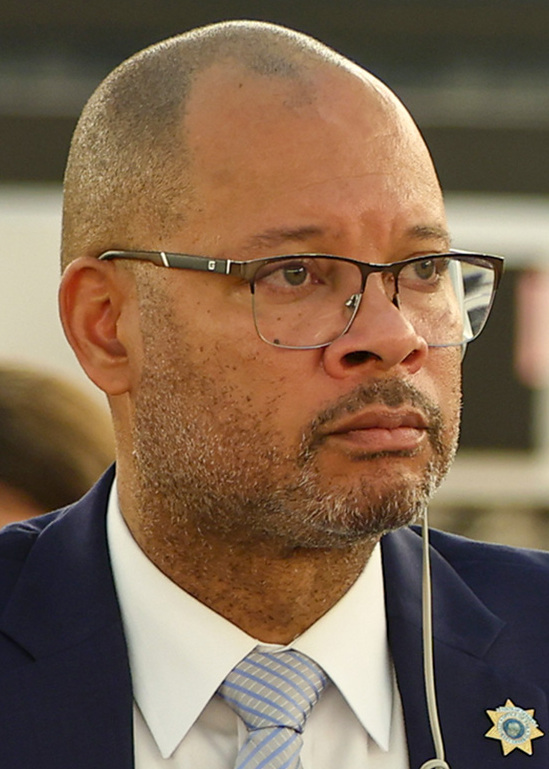

Nominee	Aaron Ford	Joe Lombardo
Party	Democratic	Republican
Popular vote	563,151	480,595
Percentage	51.59%	44.03%
- County results Ford: 50–60% Lombardo: 50–60% 60–70% 70–80% 80-90%
Governor before election
Joe Lombardo
Republican
Elected Governor
Aaron Ford
Democratic

The 2026 Nevada gubernatorial election was held on November 3, 2026, to elect the governor of Nevada. Republican incumbent Joe Lombardo sought re-election to a second term, but lost to Democratic attorney general Aaron Ford.

Primary elections took place on June 9, 2026. Lombardo won the Republican nomination with 91.0% of the vote. Ford won the Democratic nomination with 63.8% over Washoe commission chair Alexis Hill.

Lombardo is the second consecutive governor of Nevada to lose re-election after Steve Sisolak in 2022. Ford became Nevada's first African American governor and the first Black person elected governor of a U.S. state west of the Mississippi River.

Lombardo was one of two Republican governors to lose re-election in 2026, the other one being Greg Abbott in Texas.

== Background ==
Nevada is considered to be a purple to slightly blue state at the federal and state levels, with neither party having control of all three branches of government. Apart from the governor, Nevada's lieutenant governor and state controller are Republicans. Nevada's attorney general, treasurer, and state secretary of state are Democrats. Donald Trump won the state in 2024, becoming the first Republican presidential nominee to win the state since 2004.

The Nevada Legislature is controlled by members of the Democratic Party, with a majority in both the state assembly and senate. The lieutenant governor, a Republican, serves as the president of the state senate but only votes in the case of a tie. At the federal level, both United States Senators and three out of four members of the United States House of Representatives from Nevada are Democrats.

With the exception of 2018, Republicans have won every gubernatorial election in the state since 1998.

== Republican primary ==
=== Candidates ===
==== Nominee ====
- Joe Lombardo, incumbent governor (2023–present)

==== Eliminated in primary ====
- Donald J. Beaudry Jr., AI executive
- Irina Hansen, salon owner and candidate for mayor of Las Vegas in 2024
- M. Kameron Hawkins, candidate for lieutenant governor in 2022
- Matthew Winterhawk, businessman
- Jose M. Zalaya
- Barak Zilberberg, candidate for governor in 2022

=== Endorsements ===
Joe Lombardo

Executive branch officials

- Donald Trump, president of the United States (2017–2021, 2025–present)

Labor unions

- Clark County Education Association

Party chapters

- Clark County Republican Party

Organizations

- Turning Point Action

=== Polling ===
Poll source	Date(s) administered	Sample size (Note: Key: A – all adults RV – registered voters LV – likely voters V – unclear)	Margin of error	Irina Hansen	Joe Lombardo	Matthew Winterhawk	Jose Zalaya	Undecided
Noble Predictive Insights	March 10–13, 2026	306 (V)	± 5.6%	4%	60%	7%	4%	24%

=== Results ===
Results by county: Lombardo: 70–80%; 80–90%; >90%

Republican primary results
Party	Candidate	Votes	%
Republican	Joe Lombardo (incumbent)	172,150	90.8
None of These Candidates		4,367	2.3
Republican	Irina Hansen	4,114	2.2
Republican	Matthew Winterhawk	3,452	1.8
Republican	Donald J. Beaudry Jr.	2,482	1.3
Republican	M. Kameron Hawkins	1,230	0.7
Republican	Jose M. Zalaya	1,095	0.6
Republican	Barak Zilberberg	744	0.4
Total votes		189,638	100.0

==== Results by county ====
County	Joe Lombardo		None of These Candidates		Various candidates (Note: Combined totals of multiple different candidates.)		Margin (Note: Margin given is Lombardo total minus "None of These Candidates" total.)		Total
County	#	%	#	%	#	%	#	%	Total
Carson City	5,886	91.31%	178	2.76%	382	5.93%	5,708	88.55%	6,446
Churchill	3,035	90.44%	73	2.18%	248	7.39%	2,962	88.26%	3,356
Clark	88,894	91.45%	1,794	1.85%	6,516	6.71%	87,100	89.60%	97,204
Douglas	10,550	92.85%	278	2.45%	535	4.71%	10,272	90.40%	11,363
Elko	3,437	87.59%	106	2.70%	381	9.71%	3,331	84.89%	3,924
Esmeralda	189	80.43%	28	11.91%	18	7.66%	161	68.52%	235
Eureka	368	81.78%	25	5.56%	57	12.67%	343	76.22%	450
Humboldt	1,740	86.35%	66	3.28%	209	10.38%	1,674	83.07%	2,015
Lander	823	77.79%	102	9.64%	133	12.57%	721	68.15%	1,058
Lincoln	856	88.89%	36	3.74%	71	7.37%	820	85.15%	963
Lyon	7,860	90.58%	194	2.24%	623	7.20%	7,666	88.34%	8,677
Mineral	450	81.23%	26	4.69%	78	14.08%	424	76.54%	554
Nye	6,362	85.04%	186	2.49%	933	12.45%	6,176	82.55%	7,481
Pershing	651	81.99%	48	6.05%	95	11.97%	603	75.94%	794
Storey	789	89.35%	29	3.28%	65	7.36%	760	86.07%	883
Washoe	39,160	91.34%	1,143	2.67%	2,568	5.99%	38,017	88.67%	42,871
White Pine	1,100	80.88%	55	4.04%	205	15.07%	1,045	76.84%	1,360
Total	172,150	90.78%	4,367	2.30%	13,117	6.92%	167,783	88.48%	189,634

== Democratic primary ==
=== Candidates ===
==== Nominee ====
- Aaron Ford, Nevada attorney general (2019–present)

==== Eliminated in primary ====
- Sunshine Arterburn
- Miqehl Bayfield
- Emile Bouari, businessman
- James Cooper
- Alexis Hill, Washoe County commission chair (2023–present) from the 1st district (2021–present)

==== Declined ====
- Sandra Jauregui, majority leader of the Nevada Assembly (2023–present) from the 41st district (2016–present) (running for lieutenant governor; endorsed Ford)
- Steve Yeager, speaker of the Nevada Assembly (2022–present) from the 9th district (2016–present)

=== Endorsements ===
Aaron Ford

U.S. senators

- Catherine Cortez Masto, Nevada (2017–present)
- Jacky Rosen, Nevada (2019–present)

U.S. representatives

- Steven Horsford, NV-04 (2013–2015, 2019–present)
- Susie Lee, NV-03 (2019–present)
- Dina Titus, NV-01 (2009–2011, 2013–present)

State legislators

- Reuben D'Silva, AD-28 (2022–present)
- Cecelia González, AD-16 (2020–present)
- Sandra Jauregui, majority leader of the Nevada Assembly from AD-41 (2016–present)
- Daniele Monroe-Moreno, speaker pro tempore of the Nevada Assembly (2023–present) from AD-01 (2016–present) and chair of the Nevada Democratic Party (2023–present)
- David Orentlicher, AD-20 (2020–present)
- Selena Torres, AD-03 (2019–present)
- Fabian Doñate, SD-10 (2021–present)

Labor unions

- Nevada State Education Association
- Washoe Education Association

Organizations

- End Citizens United
- Giffords
- Nevada Conservation League
- Reproductive Freedom for All
- Jewish Democratic Council of America
Alexis Hill

State legislators

- Chris Giunchigliani, AD-9 (1991–2006)

Organizations

- Progressive Leadership Alliance of Nevada Action

=== Polling ===
Poll source	Date(s) administered	Sample size	Margin of error	Aaron Ford	Alexis Hill	Other	Undecided
Change Research (D) (Note: Poll sponsored by Hill's campaign)	December 11–18, 2025	555 (LV)	± 4.3%	48%	13%	1% (Note: "Would not vote" with 1%)	39%

=== Results ===
Results by county: Ford: 40–50%; 50–60%; 60-70%; Tie: 30–40%

Democratic primary results
Party	Candidate	Votes	%
Democratic	Aaron Ford	118,831	63.3
Democratic	Alexis Hill	44,849	23.9
None of These Candidates		7,502	4.0
Democratic	James Cooper	6,657	3.5
Democratic	Sunshine Arterburn	5,012	2.7
Democratic	Emile Bouari	2,795	1.5
Democratic	Miqehl Bayfield	2,172	1.2
Total votes		187,818	100.0

==== Results by county ====
County	Aaron Ford		Alexis Hill		None of These Candidates		Various candidates (Note: Combined totals of multiple different candidates.)		Margin		Total
County	#	%	#	%	#	%	#	%	#	%	Total
Carson City	2,661	62.10%	1,122	26.18%	184	4.29%	318	7.41%	1,539	35.92%	4,285
Churchill	434	52.29%	239	28.80%	66	7.95%	91	10.95%	195	23.49%	830
Clark	87,450	66.15%	26,974	20.41%	5,147	3.89%	12,621	9.54%	60,476	45.74%	132,192
Douglas	2,357	64.43%	873	23.87%	166	4.54%	262	7.15%	1,484	40.56%	3,658
Elko	478	48.68%	304	30.96%	60	6.11%	140	14.26%	174	17.72%	982
Esmeralda	6	33.33%	5	27.78%	6	33.33%	1	5.56%	0	0.00%	18
Eureka	10	40.00%	2	8.00%	3	12.00%	10	40.00%	7	28.00%	25
Humboldt	209	49.06%	145	34.04%	33	7.75%	39	9.15%	64	15.02%	426
Lander	59	46.83%	32	25.40%	22	17.46%	13	10.32%	27	21.43%	126
Lincoln	55	49.55%	9	8.11%	29	26.13%	18	16.22%	26	23.42%	111
Lyon	1,412	56.89%	647	26.07%	160	6.45%	263	10.60%	765	30.82%	2,482
Mineral	135	54.22%	46	18.47%	40	16.06%	28	11.24%	89	35.75%	249
Nye	1,548	62.65%	473	19.14%	184	7.45%	266	10.77%	1,075	43.51%	2,471
Pershing	85	51.83%	48	29.27%	16	9.76%	15	9.15%	37	22.56%	164
Storey	163	54.88%	78	26.26%	15	5.05%	41	13.81%	85	28.62%	297
Washoe	21,655	55.17%	13,802	35.16%	1,333	3.40%	2,461	6.27%	7,853	20.01%	39,251
White Pine	114	45.42%	50	19.92%	38	15.14%	49	19.52%	64	25.50%	251
Total	118,831	63.27%	44,849	23.88%	7,502	3.99%	16,636	8.86%	73,982	39.39%	187,818

== Independent candidates ==
=== Candidates ===
- Danielle Ford, member of the Nevada State Board of Education

=== Did not qualify for ballot ===
- Christopher Battenberg
- Max Beck, Lyon county deputy sheriff
- Jordan Koteras
- Allen Rheinhart, perennial candidate
- Emilio R. Rodriguez
- John T. Scott

== General election ==
=== Predictions ===
Source	Ranking	As of
The Cook Political Report	Tossup	October 29, 2026
Decision Desk HQ	Tossup	November 3, 2026
Fox News	Tossup	November 1, 2026
Inside Elections	Tossup	October 29, 2026
NBC News	Tossup	November 3, 2026
RealClearPolitics	Tossup	November 1, 2026
Sabato's Crystal Ball	Lean D (flip)	November 2, 2026
Silver Bulletin	Tossup	November 3, 2026

=== Post-primary endorsements ===
Joe Lombardo (R)

Statewide officials

- Stavros Anthony, lieutenant governor of Nevada (2023–present)

Individuals

- Dana White, CEO of the Ultimate Fighting Championship

Labor unions

- International Brotherhood of Electrical Workers Local 1245

Organizations

- National Federation of Independent Business
- NRA Political Victory Fund

Newspapers

- Las Vegas Review-Journal
Aaron Ford (D)

Executive branch officials

- Kamala Harris, former vice president of the United States (2021–2025)
- Barack Obama, former president of the United States (2009–2017)

U.S. senators

- Elizabeth Warren, Massachusetts (2013–present)

Statewide officials

- Wes Moore, governor of Maryland (2023–present)
- Gavin Newsom, governor of California (2019–present)

Labor unions

- United Auto Workers

Organizations

- Everytown for Gun Safety
- Human Rights Campaign

Newspapers

- Las Vegas Sun

=== Polling ===
Aggregate polls

Source of poll aggregation	Dates administered	Dates updated	Joe Lombardo (R)	Aaron Ford (D)	Other/Undecided (Note: Calculated by taking the difference of 100% and all other candidates combined.)	Margin
270toWin	September 5–26, 2026	October 20, 2026	42.0%	42.0%	16.0%	Tie
Decision Desk HQ	through October 25, 2026	October 27, 2026	44.8%	43.5%	11.7%	Lombardo +1.3%
FiftyPlusOne	through October 25, 2026	October 27, 2026	44.8%	45.5%	9.7%	Ford +0.7%
RealClearPolitics	September 5–26, 2026	October 6, 2026	42.0%	42.0%	16.0%	Tie
Silver Bulletin	through October 25, 2026	October 27, 2026	45.1%	44.6%	10.3%	Lombardo +0.5%
Average			43.7%	43.5%	12.8%	Lombardo +0.2%

Poll source	Date(s) administered	Sample size	Margin of error	Joe Lombardo (R)	Aaron Ford (D)	Other	Undecided
Noble Predictive Insights	October 26–28, 2026	487 (LV)	± 4.4%	47%	47%	2% (Note: Danielle Ford (I) with 1%; "Another candidate not listed" with 1%)	4%
Hart Research (D) (Note: Poll sponsored by A More Affordable Nevada, which supports the Democratic Governors Association)	October 20–25, 2026	950 (LV)	± 3.5%	45%	49%	—	6%
RedBox Research (D)	October 20–23, 2026	1,407 (LV)	± 3.6%	43%	46%	8%	4%
Global Strategy Group (D) (Note: Poll sponsored by Aaron Ford's campaign)	October 8–13, 2026	700 (LV)	± 3.7%	48%	47%	—	5%
Concord Public Opinion Partners (D) (Note: Poll sponsored by Education Reform Now Advocacy)	September 26–30, 2026	565 (LV)	± 4.1%	43%	42%	7%	8%
Noble Predictive Insights	September 22–26, 2026	800 (RV)	± 3.5%	38%	37%	12% (Note: Danielle Ford (I) with 7%; "None of these candidates" with 4%; "Another candidate" with 1%)	13%
Noble Predictive Insights	September 22–26, 2026	708 (LV)	± 3.7%	42%	40%	10% (Note: Danielle Ford (I) with 7%; "None of these candidates" with 2%; "Another candidate" with 1%)	9%
Emerson College	September 5–8, 2026	680 (LV)	± 3.7%	42%	44%	2% (Note: Danielle Ford (I) with 2%)	11%
Tarrance Group (R) (Note: Poll sponsored by Better Nevada PAC and the Republican Governors Association, both of which support Lombardo)	July 25–29, 2026	— (LV)	± 4.3%	50%	43%	—	7%
Public Policy Polling (D) (Note: Poll sponsored by the Democratic Governors Association)	July 15–16, 2026	558 (LV)	± 4.2%	44%	44%	–	12%
Grassroots Targeting (R)	July 8–6, 2026	— (LV)	—	52%	40%	—	8%
Public Opinion Strategies (R) (Note: Poll sponsored by the Republican Governors Association, which supports Lombardo)	June 27–29, 2026	— (LV)	± 4.0%	51%	42%	—	7%
	June 9, 2026	Primary elections					
Global Strategy Group (D)	May 5–11, 2026	700 (LV)	± 3.7%	45%	42%	5% (Note: "None of these candidates" with 5%.)	8%
Noble Predictive Insights	March 10–13, 2026	845 (RV)	± 3.4%	39%	38%	6% (Note: "A third-party candidate" with 6%.)	17%
Hart Research (D) (Note: Poll commissioned by The Majority Institute, a Democrat-aligned firm)	February 11–17, 2026	800 (LV)	–	46%	43%	–	11%
Emerson College	November 16–18, 2025	800 (RV)	± 3.4%	41%	41%	–	18%
Noble Predictive Insights	October 7–13, 2025	766 (RV)	± 3.5%	40%	37%	–	23%
Vote TXT (Note: Poll commissioned by Nevada Newsmakers)	May 15–19, 2023	412 (RV)	± 4.7%	51%	30%	7% (Note: "Some other candidate" with 7%)	12%

Hypothetical polling

Irina Hansen vs. Aaron Ford

Poll source	Date(s) administered	Sample size	Margin of error	Irina Hansen (R)	Aaron Ford (D)	Other	Undecided
Noble Predictive Insights	March 10–13, 2026	845 (RV)	± 3.4%	32%	37%	8% (Note: "A third-party candidate" with 8%.)	23%

Matthew Winterhawk vs. Aaron Ford

Poll source	Date(s) administered	Sample size	Margin of error	Matthew Winterhawk (R)	Aaron Ford (D)	Other	Undecided
Noble Predictive Insights	March 10–13, 2026	845 (RV)	± 3.4%	31%	37%	8%	24%

Jose Zalaya vs. Aaron Ford

Poll source	Date(s) administered	Sample size	Margin of error	Jose Zalaya (R)	Aaron Ford (D)	Other	Undecided
Noble Predictive Insights	March 10–13, 2026	845 (RV)	± 3.4%	30%	36%	9% (Note: "A third-party candidate" with 9%.)	25%

=== Results ===
2026 Nevada gubernatorial election
Party	Candidate	Votes	%	±%
Democratic	Aaron Ford	563,151	51.59	
Republican	Joe Lombardo (incumbent)	480,595	44.03	
Independent	Danielle Ford	31,765	2.91	
None of These Candidates		16,070	1.47	
Total votes		1,091,587	100.0	
Democratic gain from Republican				

=== By congressional district ===
District	Ford	Lombardo	Elected Representative
1st	54.9%	40.6%	Dina Titus
2nd	44.4%	50.8%	Teresa Benitez-Thompson
3rd	53.6%	42.5%	Susie Lee
4th	56.1%	39.6%	Steven Horsford

== Analysis ==
Ford's election marked the largest Democratic vote share since 1994, amid an election cycle that was described as the biggest blue wave in the state since 1974, with Democrats winning every statewide office on the ballot. Latino voters, which are a significant percentage of Nevada’s electorate, showed up in greater numbers than in the presidential election, while Democrats erased Republican gains in this demographic. Democrats also erased Republican gains amongst young voters.

=== Exit poll ===
2026 Nevada gubernatorial election (CNN)
Demographic subgroup	Ford	Lombardo	% of total vote
Ideology
Liberals	93	3	24
Moderates	60	35	44
Conservatives	8	89	31
Party
Democrats	95	3	32
Republicans	5	92	32
Independents	55	37	36
Donald Trump job approval
Approve	3	95	38
Disapprove	82	12	61
2024 presidential vote
Kamala Harris	92	5	47
Donald Trump	5	91	43
Another candidate	42	36	2
Did not vote	71	21	7
Gender
Men	48	48	48
Women	55	41	51
Income
$100,000 or more	47	49	42
$50,000–$99,999	53	44	32
Less than $50,000	58	36	26
Race/ethnicity
White	45	50	63
Latino	61	33	15
Black	83	13	8
Asian	52	47	8
All other voters	52	44	6
White born-again or evangelical Christian?
Yes	19	80	12
No	56	39	88
Race by gender
White men	42	53	31
White women	48	48	31
Black men	75	20	3
Black women	89	7	4
Latino men	60	37	7
Latina women	62	30	8
All other voters	54	44	15
Age
18–29 years old	81	15	11
30–44 years old	61	31	20
45–64 years old	47	48	34
65 and older	42	56	35
Area type
Urban	57	37	33
Suburban	56	41	49
Rural	31	64	18
Education
College graduate	55	41	39
No college degree	50	46	61
Education by race
White college graduates	51	44	26
Non-white college graduates	63	34	12
Whites without college	41	54	37
Non-whites without college	61	34	25
Education by gender and race
White women with college degrees	56	39	13
White women without college degrees	43	53	18
White men with college degrees	46	49	13
White men without college degrees	39	56	18
Voters of color	62	34	37
Educational attainment
Advanced degree	60	37	17
Bachelor's degree	52	44	22
Associate's degree	46	49	12
Some college	46	50	24
Never attended college	55	41	26

== See also ==
- 2026 United States elections
- 2026 Nevada elections

== Notes ==
Partisan clients
