= Mariluz Garcia =

American politician

Member of the Washoe County Board of Commissioners from the 3rd district
- Incumbent
- Assumed office January 9, 2023

Personal details
- Born: Elko, Nevada
- Party: Democratic
- Education: University of Nevada, Reno
- Occupation: Educator, politician

Mariluz Garcia is an American politician and educator serving as a member of the Washoe County Board of Commissioners in Nevada, representing the 3rd district. A member of the Democratic Party, she was elected in 2022 and has served as vice chair of the board since January 2026. Before taking office, she was the executive director of the Dean's Future Scholars program at the University of Nevada, Reno.

== Early life and career ==
Garcia was born and raised in Elko, Nevada, and moved to Washoe County in 1998. She holds bachelor's, master's and doctoral degrees from the College of Education and Human Development at the University of Nevada, Reno.

Before her election, Garcia was executive director of the university's Dean's Future Scholars program, which supports low-income and first-generation students in completing high school and entering college.

== Political career ==
=== 2022 election ===
Garcia led a three-candidate Democratic primary for the 3rd district of the Washoe County Board of Commissioners in June 2022, ahead of Kyle Isacksen and Hawah Ahmad. In the November 8, 2022 general election she defeated Republican Denise Myer, 62.4% to 37.6%. She was sworn in on January 9, 2023.

=== Surveillance and harassment ===
In March 2023, a joint investigation by KUNR, The Nevada Independent and APM Reports reported that Garcia had been the subject of surveillance by two private investigators during her 2022 campaign, one of whom later admitted to placing a GPS tracking device on the car of Reno mayor Hillary Schieve. The private investigators canvassed her neighborhood asking whether she lived within the district she was seeking to represent, where she did in fact live. Campaign finance records subsequently showed that one of the investigators had been paid by the mother of Hawah Ahmad, Garcia's primary opponent.

In May 2024, The Nevada Independent reported that Garcia had been followed home and surveilled at public meetings, and that strangers had approached her family. She moved that year. The Washoe County District Attorney's office reviewed and rejected the claims about her residency made by the private investigators. Garcia said of her campaigns after the harassment, "My primary and general elections were both like combat sports."

=== 2024 election certification dispute ===
On July 9, 2024, the Board of Commissioners voted 3–2 against certifying recounts of two June 2024 primary contests, with the board's three Republicans in the majority. Garcia was one of two commissioners who voted to certify the results. After the Nevada Attorney General petitioned the Nevada Supreme Court on behalf of the Secretary of State, the board reversed itself on July 16 and certified the recounts 4–1.

=== 2026 election ===
Garcia announced a bid for re-election in August 2025. Garcia and Republican Troy Regas advanced directly to the November 3, 2026 general election. Garcia went on to win the general election.

== Tenure ==
Garcia represents the county on regional bodies including the Economic Development Authority of Western Nevada and the Regional Fire Services Study Board.

Garcia voted with the majority in March 2025 to adopt Washoe County's first climate action plan, which sets a target of net-zero emissions by 2050. She voted in November 2024 for changes to the county development code permitting a wider range of "missing middle" housing types to help encourage development of more affordable housing opportunities.

In March 2026, Garcia moved to overturn the county planning commission's denial of the Sierra Reflections project, a 940-home subdivision on 760 acres in the Pleasant Valley area because of a proposed $1 million payment from the developers for a consolidated fire station in the neighborhood.
