= Marty O'Donnell =

Marty O'Donnell may refer to:

- Martin O'Donnell (born 1955), known as Marty, American composer
- Marty O'Donnell (boxer) (born 1973), Canadian Olympic boxer
