= State Bar of Nevada =

Bar Association

- Formation: 1928
- Type: Legal Society
- Headquarters: Las Vegas, NV (1928-present)
- Location: United States
- Members: 8,600 in 2012
- Website: http://www.nvbar.org/

The State Bar of Nevada is a public corporation operating under the supervision of the Nevada Supreme Court to regulate attorneys in the State of Nevada. It provides education and development programs for its members and to the public. Its departments include admissions, lawyer regulation and client protection divisions, and it provides services such as lawyer referral, law related education and access to justice. It currently has two office locations in Las Vegas and Reno.

== Membership ==
In order to practice law in Nevada’s state and local courts, it is mandatory for lawyers to be members of the State Bar of Nevada. In 2012, there were more than 8,600 attorneys licensed to actively practice law in Nevada. The majority of these attorneys practice in Clark County, Nevada.

== Leadership ==
The State Bar of Nevada is overseen by a board of governors, which carries out the state bar's administrative functions, sets policies and procedures, effects rule changes, takes legislative positions relative to the administration of justice and oversees the bar's fiduciary responsibilities.

The board of governors has 15 members, who represent four Nevada state districts. Elections for the board are held annually, and governors are selected by the members of their districts to serve two-year terms. Also serving on the board is the immediate past president and two ex-officio members representing the William S. Boyd School of Law and the Board of Bar Examiners.

In addition, the State Bar of Nevada's leadership includes numerous volunteer attorneys who serve on the bar's 17 committees.

== History ==
The State Bar of Nevada has operated for more than 80 years; it was founded in 1928.

Prior to the formation of the State Bar of Nevada, a preliminary organization, the Nevada Bar Association, was established in 1911. At that time, the majority of lawyers resided in Washoe County, and membership in the association was voluntary.

After becoming incorporated by state legislation in 1928, the newly formed State Bar of Nevada took on several milestone tasks, including:

- May 1, 1928: Board of Bar Examiners named
- June 27, 1928: Rules of Procedure adopted
- August 3, 1928: Rules of Professional Conduct adopted
- August 21, 1928: Bylaws and Rules & Regulations of the State Bar of Nevada adopted

By the end of 1929, there were 345 active members of the state bar – 121 lived in Washoe County, 104 lived outside the state, and only 24 resided in Clark County.
