= Progressive Leadership Alliance of Nevada =

Campaign group in United States

The Progressive Leadership Alliance of Nevada (PLAN) is a non-partisan, non-profit organization in Nevada, United States.

PLAN was founded in 1994. PLAN has grown from its 12 founding groups to a current membership of 30 organizations that include anti-poverty activists, children's advocates, people with disabilities, environmentalists, gay and transgender people, labor unions, people of color, and women.

PLAN has offices in Carson City, Las Vegas and Reno.

== PLAN's structure ==
- State director
- Northern coordinator
- Southern coordinator
- Communications director
- Field director
- Technology director
- Finance director
- Community Organizers

== PLAN Projects ==
Racial Equity Report Card PLAN partners with Western States Center to produce a Racial Equality Report Card (RERC) while Nevada's legislature is in session.

The RERC examines legislation introduced during each session of Nevada's legislature. It grades each chamber of the state legislature separately, as well as the Governor, on their responses to bills graded for the report card.

Nevada Fair Mining Tax Nevadans for Fair Mining Taxes is a coalition dedicated to ensuring a stable and equitable revenue source for our state by undoing antebellum Constitutional provisions which allow the mining industry to evade paying its fair share of taxes. PLAN supported Question 2 in the 2014 election, which would have removed a cap in the state constitution on mining taxes. The measure was defeated by a less than 1% margin.

== PLAN Member Organizations ==
AFSCME Local 4041

Committee to Aid Abused Women

Culinary Workers Local 226

Family Ties of Nevada

Food Bank of Northern Nevada

Gay and Lesbian Community Center of Southern Nevada

Great Basin Resource Watch

Great Basin Water Network

Human Services Network

National Association of Social Workers - Nevada Chapter

Nevada Conservation League

Nevada Justice Association

Nevada Lawyers for Progressive Policy

Nevada NOW

Nevada Partnership for Homeless Youth

Nevada State Education Association

Nevada Women's Lobby

People of Color Caucus

Planned Parenthood Mar Monte

Planned Parenthood of Southern Nevada

ProgressNow Nevada

Reno-Sparks Indian Colony

Reno-Sparks NAACP

SEIU Local 1107

Sierra Club - Toiyabe Chapter

Sierra Interfaith Action for Peace

Sunrise Sustainable Resources Group

TRENDZ

Unitarian Universalist Congregation of Las Vegas

Unitarian Universalist Social Action Committee - Reno

Washoe Legal Services
