= Aaron Ford =

Governor-elect of Nevada (born 1972)

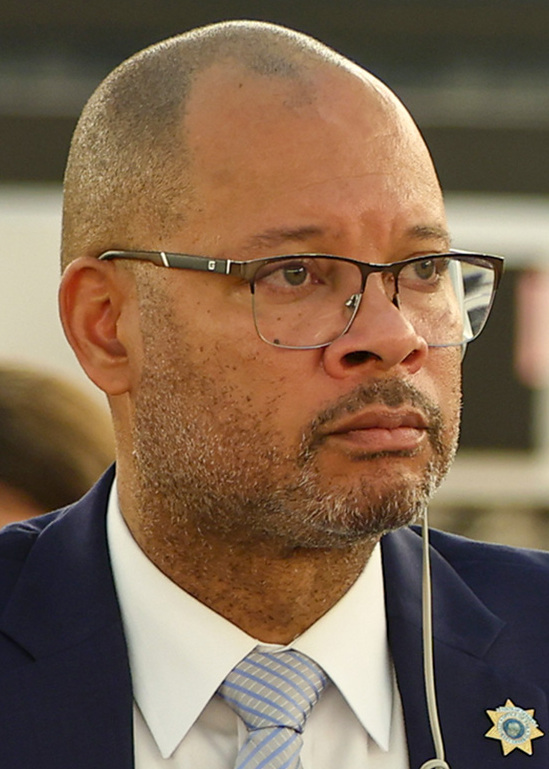
- Ford in 2023

Governor-elect of Nevada
- Assuming office January 4, 2027
- Lieutenant: Sandra Jauregui (elect)
- Succeeding: Joe Lombardo

34th Attorney General of Nevada
- Incumbent
- Assumed office January 7, 2019
- Governor: Steve Sisolak; Joe Lombardo
- Preceded by: Adam Laxalt
State Senate positions
Majority Leader of the Nevada Senate
In office November 9, 2016 – November 8, 2018
Preceded by	Michael Roberson
Succeeded by	Kelvin Atkinson
Minority Leader of the Nevada Senate
In office November 5, 2014 – November 9, 2016
Preceded by	Michael Roberson
Succeeded by	Michael Roberson

Member of the Nevada Senate from the 11th district
- In office February 4, 2013 – December 4, 2018
- Preceded by: Michael A. Schneider
- Succeeded by: Dallas Harris

Personal details
- Born: Aaron Darnell Ford; May 24, 1972 (age 54) Dallas, Texas, U.S.
- Party: Democratic
- Spouse: Berna Rhodes (m. 1996)
- Children: 3
- Education: Texas A&M University (BA); George Washington University; (MA); Ohio State University (MA, JD, PhD)
- Website: Official website; Campaign website

Aaron Darnell Ford (born May 24, 1972) is an American former teacher, lawyer and politician who is the governor-elect of Nevada. A member of the Democratic Party, Ford has served since 2019 as the 34th attorney general of Nevada. From 2013 to 2018 he represented the 11th district in the Nevada Senate.

Born and raised in Texas, Ford earned degrees from Texas A&M University, George Washington University, and Ohio State University. He taught math in public schools and clerked for federal judges before practicing law in Texas and Nevada. After an unsuccessful campaign in 2010, he was elected to the Nevada Senate in 2012 and led the Nevada Senate Democratic Caucus, serving as minority leader from 2014 to 2016 and majority leader from 2016 to 2018. He ran for attorney general in 2018 and defeated Republican nominee Wesley Duncan by 0.4% of the vote. He was reelected in 2022 against Republican nominee Sigal Chattah by the largest margin for a statewide Democratic incumbent in Nevada history.

Ford was elected governor of Nevada in 2026, defeating Republican incumbent Joe Lombardo. When he assumes office on January 4, 2027, he will become Nevada's first Black governor.

== Early life and education ==
Ford was born in Dallas, Texas and raised in Houston, Texas. He earned a scholarship after graduation from Skyline High School and received his undergraduate degree from Texas A&M University in 1994. He was the first in his family to graduate from college. He earned a master's degree in international education from George Washington University. He also has an M.A., J.D., and Ph.D. from Ohio State University.

During his college years between 1991 and 1994, Ford was arrested four times on misdemeanor charges, though these arrests did not result in convictions. The specific citations included public intoxication, failure to appear for a traffic violation, and a theft-related offense; the latter was dismissed after he paid restitution. Ford has publicly addressed this history, characterizing the incidents as "youthful mistakes" that provided learning experiences. He stated that he did not wish to be judged solely "on the first 20 years" of his life.

== Teaching and legal career ==
Ford has worked as a public school teacher. He clerked for federal judges Denise Page Hood and Johnnie B. Rawlinson on the Ninth Circuit Court of Appeals.

After completing his clerkships, he practiced law at firms in Texas and Nevada. Ford moved back to Texas to work at Bracewell LLP as an associate. Later, he became an associate at Weil Gotshal & Manges. Upon moving back to Las Vegas, Ford joined Snell & Wilmer and was promoted to partner a few years later. He has also worked at Eglet Prince.

== Political career ==
=== Nevada Senate ===
Ford ran for Nevada Senate in District 12 in 2010 but lost to the Republican incumbent, Joe Hardy, by around 20 points.

After relocating in 2011, Ford ran for the Nevada Senate again in District 11 in the 2012 election, defeating Republican John Drake, by 24.6%.

In 2013, Ford served as the Assistant Majority Whip and in 2015 became the Minority Leader of the Senate. In 2017, Ford became the Majority Leader after the Democratic Party regained control of the Nevada Assembly.

In 2017 Nevada legislative session, Ford led the efforts requiring law enforcement agencies to turn over rape kits for testing within 30 days and require labs to test them within 120 days. The bill mandated the creation of a Nevada-wide sexual assault kit tracking program, which would allow victims to follow the status of their rape kits as they go through the criminal justice system.

During the same session, Ford helped pass a stricter drug pricing transparency law. He also authored legislation requiring financial advisors to be held accountable to a fiduciary standard, a higher threshold than the previous suitability standard. Ford stated that the fiduciary law was motivated by his experience representing an elderly client who had been "ripped off" by an insurance salesman.

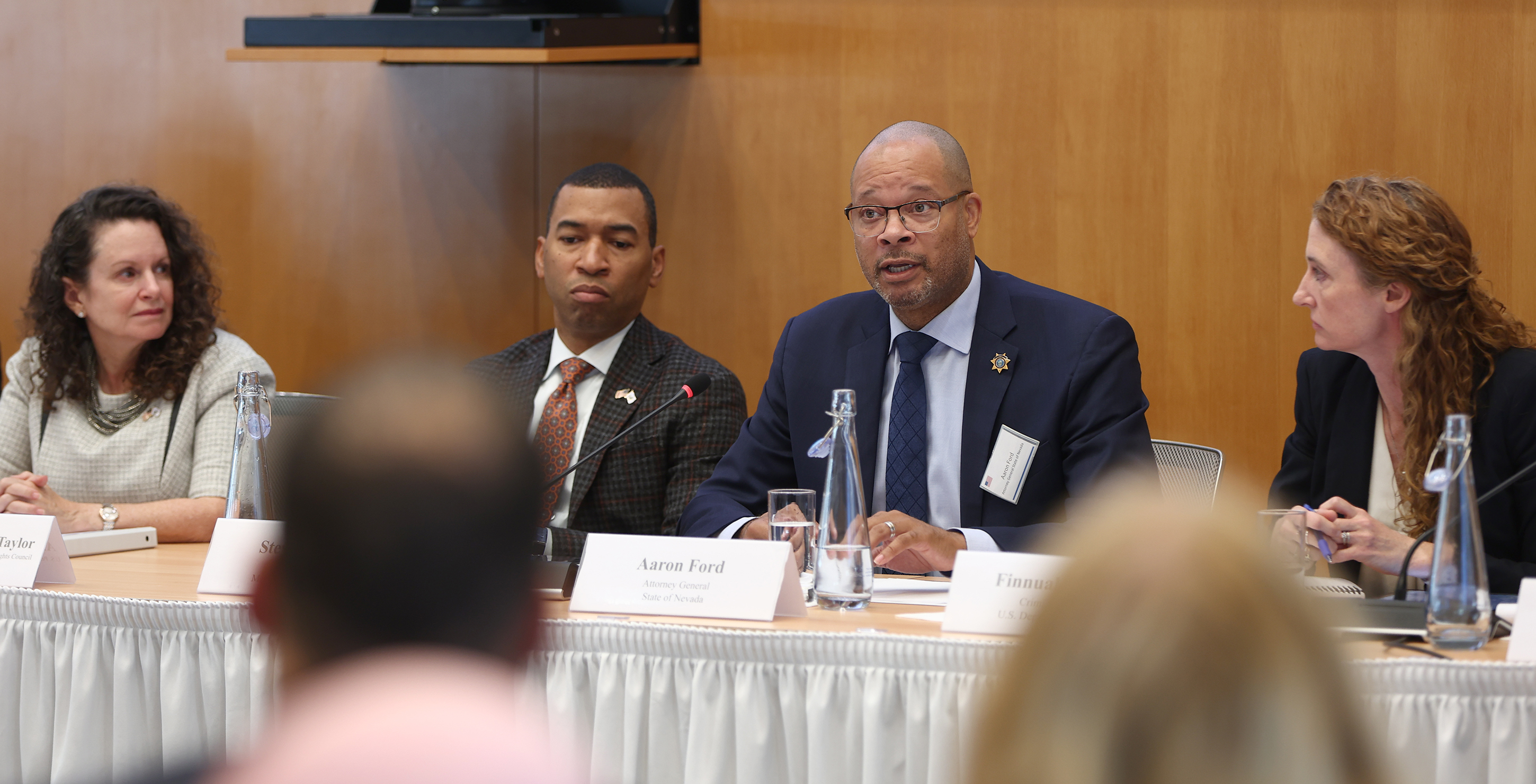
Ford in 2023 answers a question at an event before addressing the United Nations Human Rights Committee as part of delegation from the U.S. including federal, state, and local leadership and law enforcement.

During his time in the Senate, Ford served as the chair of the Committee on Natural Resources, vice chair of the Committee on Education, and was a member of the Senate Judiciary Committee.

=== Attorney General of Nevada ===
In 2018, Ford ran for and was elected as Nevada's 34th attorney general, becoming the first African American to hold a statewide constitutional office in the state. He defeated Republican nominee Wesley Duncan by just 0.4% of the vote and assumed office on January 7, 2019. He was reelected in 2022, defeating Republican nominee Sigal Chattah with 52.3% of the vote (511,263 votes) to her 44.4% (434,084 votes), the largest margin of victory for a statewide Democratic incumbent in Nevada history.

Ford secured more than $1.1 billion in settlements for Nevada to combat and treat the opioid epidemic as part of a series of lawsuits he filed against opioid manufacturers and distributors for their role in overdose deaths and healthcare system costs paid by taxpayers. In January 2022, he announced the state would receive over $285 million from a collection of settlements with major distributors AmerisourceBergen, Cardinal Health, and McKesson, as well as manufacturer Johnson & Johnson. In 2023, Ford announced the state's settlement agreement of $285 million with Walgreens for its role in contributing to the opioid crisis. The payments to the state are to take place over the course of 15 years beginning in 2023.

During his tenure as Senate majority leader and later as attorney general, Ford accepted sponsored travel funded by outside organizations, primarily the Attorney General Alliance. Financial disclosures indicate that between 2017 and 2025, Ford accepted trips to destinations including Israel, Ghana, Qatar, Spain, South Africa, Poland, and South Korea, with a total reported value exceeding $140,000. The AGA is funded largely by corporate sponsorships, including from companies subject to state regulations and litigation, drawing criticism regarding potential conflicts of interest. Ford spent one-third of 2024 out of state.

In February 2026, an ethics complaint against Ford over sponsored trips and official social media posts advanced past the initial review stage. Opened in September 2025 by Ross Armstrong, executive director of the state ethics commission, a review panel unanimously concluded on February 11 that enough evidence existed to bring the complaint to the full commission. The complaint raised two specific concerns: the use of official Attorney General social media accounts to amplify private campaign accounts and the acceptance of international trips valued over $35,000 in 2023-2024 from the Attorney General Alliance.

Ford pursued litigation against several online platforms, including Roblox, Meta, Discord, TikTok, Snapchat, YouTube and Kik, alleging that they failed to protect underage users. In April 2026, he announced a settlement with Roblox. The settlement required Roblox to pay $12 million to the state of Nevada, implement protections for minors, and fund programs such as the Boys & Girls Clubs of America.

=== Governor-elect of Nevada ===
In December 2024, Ford announced his candidacy for governor of Nevada in the 2026 election, challenging Republican incumbent Joe Lombardo. Ford, who is term-limited from seeking re-election as attorney general, officially launched his campaign in July 2025; his entry into the race followed months of speculation regarding a potential rematch between Lombardo and former governor Steve Sisolak. He defeated Lombardo in the general election, becoming the first Democrat to unseat an incumbent Republican governor of Nevada since Richard Bryan in 1982.

== Personal life ==
Ford is married to Berna Rhodes, an attorney. They have three sons, and are also raising their nephew. The couple met in college.

On July 21, 2018, the Las Vegas Review-Journal reported that Ford "has a history of failing to fully pay his taxes." According to Clark County records, the IRS filed three tax liens against Ford totaling more than $185,000 in unpaid taxes, interest, and penalties for the years 2010 through 2013. The liens were cleared in 2016. Ford's campaign manager, Peggy Yang, stated that Ford had "faced some financial difficulties" resulting from the recession, which were further complicated by the tax implications of his promotion to partner at his law firm. The Review-Journal noted that Ford purchased a new home for $468,138 in 2013, one of the years he failed to fully pay his income taxes. Ford responded that he had "short-sold a house during that time period."

== Election history ==
=== 2026 ===
2026 Nevada gubernatorial election
Party	Candidate	Votes	%	±%
Democratic	Aaron Ford	530,510	51.5%	
Republican	Joe Lombardo	455,302	44.2%	
No party preference	Danielle Ford	28,870	2.8%	
n/a	write in candidates/other	14,891	1.4%	
Total votes		1,029,573	100.0%	

=== 2022 ===
2022 Nevada attorney general election
Party	Candidate	Votes	%	±%
Democratic	Aaron Ford	511,263	52.3%	
Republican	Sigal Chattah	434,084	44.4%	
n/a	write in candidates/other	33,135	3.4%	
Total votes		978,482	100.0%	

=== 2018 ===
2018 Nevada attorney general election
Party	Candidate	Votes	%	±%
Democratic	Aaron Ford	456,225	47.2%	
Republican	Wesley Duncan	451,692	46.8%	
American Independent	Joel Hansen	32,259	3.3%	
n/a	write-in candidates/other	25,577	2.6%	
Total votes		965,753	100.0%	

=== 2016 ===
2016 Nevada 11th Senate district election
Party	Candidate	Votes	%	±%
Democratic	Aaron Ford	22,439	57.70	
Republican	Jon Frazier	14,221	36.57	
Libertarian	Lesley Chan	2,228	5.73	
Total votes		38,889	100.0%	

=== 2012 ===
2012 Nevada 11th Senate district election
Party	Candidate	Votes	%	±%
Democratic	Aaron Ford	22,188	62.3%	
Republican	John Drake	13,453	37.7%	
Total votes		35,641	100.0%	

Nevada Senate
Preceded by Michael Roberson	Minority Leader of the Nevada Senate; 2014–2016	Succeeded by Michael Roberson
Preceded by Michael Roberson	Majority Leader of the Nevada Senate; 2016–2018	Succeeded by Kelvin Atkinson
Party political offices
Preceded by Steve Sisolak	Democratic nominee for Governor of Nevada; 2026	Most recent
Legal offices
Preceded by Adam Laxalt	Attorney General of Nevada; 2019–present	Incumbent
Political offices
Preceded by Joe Lombardo	Governor of Nevada; Taking office 2027	Elect
