= 2012 Nevada Senate election =

- November 6, 2012

12 out of 21 seats in the Nevada Senate 11 seats needed for a majority
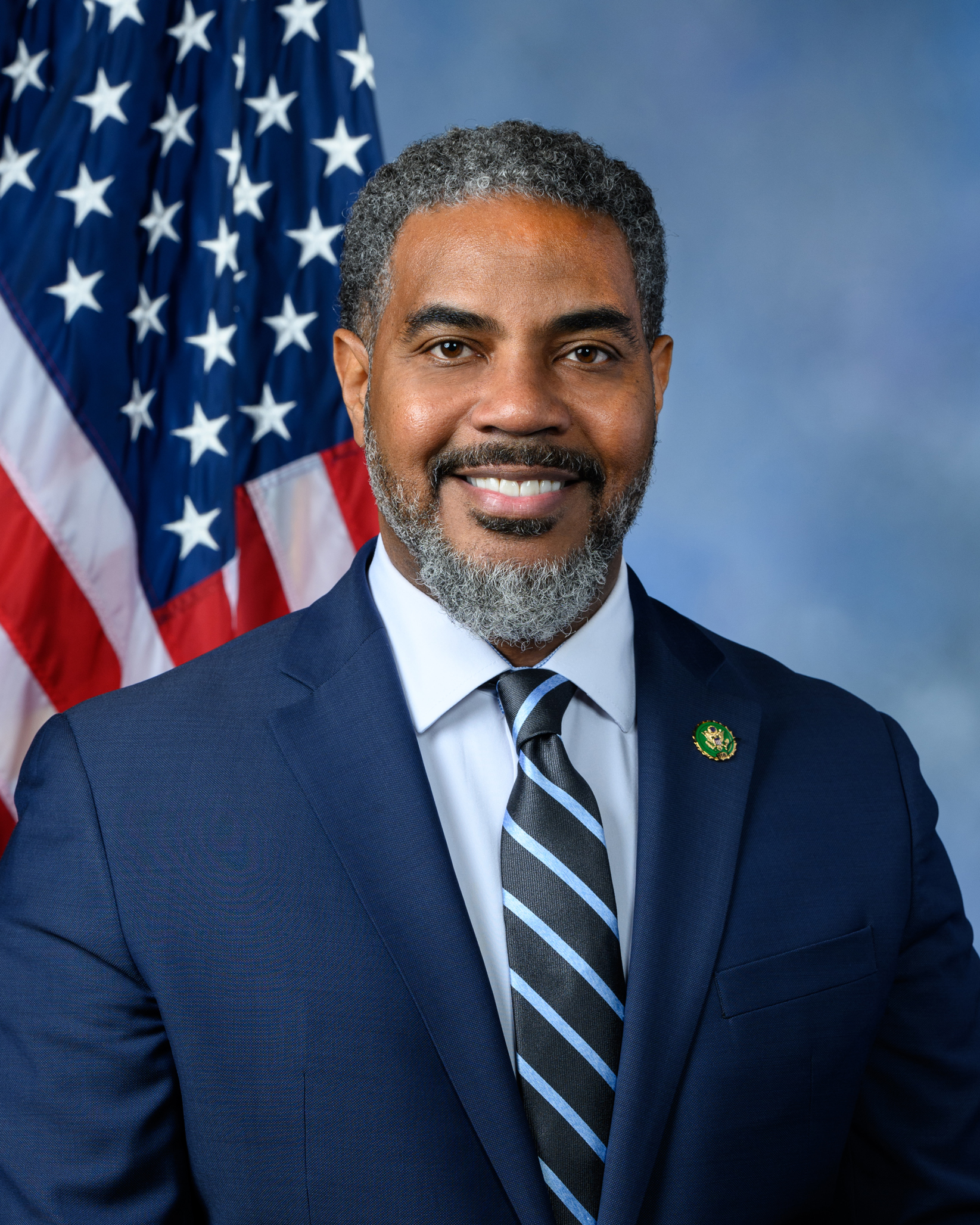

	Majority party	Minority party
Leader	Steven Horsford (retired)	Mike McGinness (term-limited)
Party	Democratic	Republican
Leader since	February 9, 2009	November 2010
Leader's seat	District 4	District 18
Last election	11	10
Seats after	11	10
Seat change	Steady	Steady
Popular vote	292,296	216,441
Percentage	55.08%	40.79%
Majority Leader before election
Steven Horsford
Democratic
Elected Majority Leader
Mo Denis
Democratic

The 2012 Nevada Senate election was held on November 6, 2012, to determine which party would control the Nevada Senate for the following two years in the 77th Nevada Legislature. Twelve out of the 21 seats in the Nevada Senate were up for election, including two special elections in District 9 and District 13 for the remaining two years of Republican Elizabeth Helgelien's and Democrat Sheila Leslie's terms following their resignations in 2012. The primary was held on June 12, 2012. Prior to the election, 11 seats were held by Democrats and 10 seats were held by Republicans. The general election saw neither party gain nor lose any seats, thereby meaning that Democrats retained their majority in the State Senate.

== Predictions ==
Source	Ranking	As of
Governing	Tossup	October 24, 2012

== Retirements ==
=== Democrats ===
1. District 3: Valerie Wiener was term-limited.
2. District 4: Steven Horsford retired to successfully run for Nevada's 4th congressional district.
3. District 5: Shirley Breeden retired.
4. District 6: Allison Copening retired.
5. District 11: Michael A. Schneider was term-limited.

=== Republicans ===
1. District 18: Mike McGinness was term-limited.
2. District 19: Dean Rhoads was term-limited.

== Incumbents defeated ==
=== In primary ===
==== Democrats ====
1. District 1: John Lee lost renomination to Patricia Spearman.

== Closest races ==
Seats where the margin of victory was under 10%:

1. District 15, 0.46%
2. District 9, 0.70% (gain)
3. District 6, 1.66% (gain)
4. District 18, 2.76%
5. District 5, 3.92%

== Results ==
=== District 1 ===
District 1 election, 2012
Party	Candidate	Votes	%
Democratic	Patricia Spearman (incumbent)	29,026	68.71%
Independent American	Gregory Hughes	13,221	31.29%
Total votes		42,247	100.0%
Democratic hold			

=== District 3 ===
District 3 election, 2012
Party	Candidate	Votes	%
Democratic	Richard Segerblom	21,745	64.38%
Republican	Ed Gobel	12,032	35.62%
Total votes		33,777	100.0%
Democratic hold			

=== District 4 ===
District 4 election, 2012
Party	Candidate	Votes	%
Democratic	Kelvin Atkinson	27,422	79.79%
Republican	Linda West Myers	6,946	20.21%
Total votes		34,368	100.0%
Democratic hold			

=== District 5 ===
District 5 election, 2012
Party	Candidate	Votes	%
Democratic	Joyce Woodhouse	26,520	51.96%
Republican	Steve Kirk	24,524	48.04%
Total votes		51,044	100.0%
Democratic hold			

=== District 6 ===
District 6 election, 2012
Party	Candidate	Votes	%
Republican	Mark Hutchison	27,499	50.83%
Democratic	Benny Yerushalmi	26,598	49.17%
Total votes		54,097	100.0%
Republican gain from Democratic			

=== District 7 ===
District 7 election, 2012
Party	Candidate	Votes	%
Democratic	David Parks (incumbent)	25,567	64.15%
Republican	Trish Marsh	14,285	35.85%
Total votes		39,852	100.0%
Democratic hold			

=== District 9 ===
District 9 special election, 2012
Party	Candidate	Votes	%
Democratic	Justin Jones	21,849	50.35%
Republican	Mari Nakashima St. Martin	21,548	49.65%
Total votes		43,397	100.0%
Democratic gain from Republican			

=== District 11 ===
District 11 election, 2012
Party	Candidate	Votes	%
Democratic	Aaron Ford	22,188	62.25%
Republican	John Drake	13,453	37.75%
Total votes		35,641	100.0%
Democratic hold			

=== District 13 ===
District 13 election, 2012
Party	Candidate	Votes	%
Democratic	Debbie Smith	25,975	64.73%
Republican	Kathy Martin	14,151	35.27%
Total votes		40,126	100.0%
Democratic hold			

=== District 15 ===
District 15 election, 2012
Party	Candidate	Votes	%
Republican	Greg Brower (incumbent)	29,352	50.23%
Democratic	Sheila Leslie	29,086	49.77%
Total votes		58,438	100.0%
Republican hold			

=== District 18 ===
District 18 election, 2012
Party	Candidate	Votes	%
Republican	Scott Hammond	27,364	51.38%
Democratic	Kelli Ross	25,893	48.62%
Total votes		53,257	100.0%
Republican hold			

=== District 19 ===
District 19 election, 2012
Party	Candidate	Votes	%
Republican	Pete Goicoechea	25,287	56.97%
Democratic	Harley Z. Kulkin	10,427	23.49%
Independent American	Janine Hansen	8,675	19.54%
Total votes		44,389	100.0%
Republican hold			
