= 2024 Nevada Senate election =

- November 5, 2024

10 of 21 seats in the Nevada Senate 11 seats needed for a majority
| | Majority party | Minority party |
|---|---|---|
| Leader | Nicole Cannizzaro | Robin Titus |
| Party | Democratic | Republican |
| Leader's seat | 6th - Las Vegas | 17th - Wellington |
| Last election | 13 | 8 |
| Seats won | 13 | 8 |
| Seat change | Steady | Steady |
| Popular vote | 320,485 | 326,549 |
| Percentage | 49.22% | 50.15% |
| Swing | ▲9.81% | ▼9.84% |
- Democratic gain Republican gain Democratic hold Republican hold No election Democratic: 50–60% >90% Republican: 50–60% >90%
Senate Majority Leader before election
Nicole Cannizzaro
Democratic
Elected Senate Majority Leader
Nicole Cannizzaro
Democratic

The 2024 Nevada Senate election was held on Tuesday, November 5, 2024. Voters in 10 districts of the Nevada Senate elected their senators. The elections coincided with elections for other offices, including for U.S. President, U.S. Senate, U.S. House, and the State Assembly. Republicans needed to gain three seats to win control of the chamber.

The primary elections were held on Tuesday, June 11, 2024.

== Background ==
In the 2022 Nevada State Senate election, Democrats maintained control of the Nevada Senate by a 13–8 margin. Democrats have controlled the chamber since 2016.

== Predictions ==
| Source | Ranking | As of |
|---|---|---|
| CNalysis | Solid D | March 24, 2024 |

== Outgoing incumbents ==
=== Democrats ===
1. District 1: Pat Spearman was term-limited.

=== Republicans ===
1. District 15: Heidi Gansert retired.
2. District 19: Pete Goicoechea was term-limited.

=== Incumbents who resigned before end of term ===
==== Republicans ====
1. District 18: Scott Hammond resigned October 26, 2023 to become Executive Director of the Nevada Governor's Office of Workforce Innovation.

== Results summary ==
Summary of the November 8, 2022 Nevada Senate election results
| Party | Candidates | Votes | % | Seats | | | | |
| Party | Candidates | Votes | % | Before | Up | Won | After | +/– |
|---|---|---|---|---|---|---|---|---|
| Democratic | 9 | 320,485 | 49.22 | 13 | 6 | 6 | 13 | Steady |
| Republican | 9 | 326,549 | 50.15 | 8 | 4 | 4 | 8 | Steady |
| Independent | 1 | 2,078 | 0.32 | 0 | 0 | 0 | 0 | Steady |
| Independent American | 1 | 2,017 | 0.31 | 0 | 0 | 0 | 0 | Steady |
| Total | | 651,129 | 100.00 | 21 | 10 | 10 | 21 | Steady |

For districts not displayed, there is no election until 2026. † - Incumbent not seeking re-election

| District | Incumbent | Party | Elected Senator | Party |
|---|---|---|---|---|
| 1st | Pat Spearman† | Dem | Michelee Crawford | Dem |
| 3rd | Rochelle Nguyen | Dem | Rochelle Nguyen | Dem |
| 4th | Dina Neal | Dem | Dina Neal | Dem |
| 5th | Carrie Buck | Rep | Carrie Buck | Rep |
| 6th | Nicole Cannizzaro | Dem | Nicole Cannizzaro | Dem |
| 7th | Roberta Lange | Dem | Roberta Lange | Dem |
| 11th | Dallas Harris | Dem | Lori Rogich | Rep |
| 15th | Heidi Gansert† | Rep | Angie Taylor | Dem |
| 18th | Vacant (Note: Republican Senator Scott Hammond resigned on October 26, 2023 to become Executive Director of the Nevada Governor's Office of Workforce Innovation.) | | John Steinbeck | Rep |
| 19th | Pete Goicoechea | Rep | John Ellison | Rep |

== Detailed results ==
=== Results by district ===
Certified primary election results:

=== District 1 ===
Incumbent Democrat Pat Spearman has represented the district since 2012.

Nevada State Senate 1st district Democratic primary election, 2024
| Party | Candidate | Votes | % |
|---|---|---|---|
| Democratic | Michelee Crawford | 4,598 | 53.88% |
| Democratic | Clara Thomas | 3,936 | 46.12% |
| Total votes | | 8,534 | 100% |

Nevada State Senate 1st district general election, 2024
| Party | Candidate | Votes | % |
|---|---|---|---|
| Democratic | Michelee Crawford | 40,066 | 58.97% |
| Republican | Patricia Brinkley | 27,880 | 41.03% |
| Total votes | | 67,946 | 100% |
| Democratic hold | | | |

=== District 3 ===
Incumbent Democrat Rochelle Nguyen has represented the district since 2022.

Nevada State Senate 3rd district Democratic primary election, 2024
| Party | Candidate | Votes | % |
|---|---|---|---|
| Democratic | Rochelle Nguyen (incumbent) | 4,464 | 55.21% |
| Democratic | Geoconda Hughes | 3,622 | 44.79% |
| Total votes | | 8,086 | 100% |

Nevada State Senate 3rd district general election, 2024
| Party | Candidate | Votes | % |
|---|---|---|---|
| Democratic | Rochelle Nguyen (incumbent) | 28,254 | 54.81% |
| Republican | Brent Howard | 21,215 | 41.16% |
| Independent | Keya Jones | 2,078 | 4.03% |
| Total votes | | 51,547 | 100% |
| Democratic hold | | | |

=== District 4 ===
Incumbent Democrat Dina Neal has represented the district since 2020.

Nevada State Senate 4th district Democratic primary election, 2024
| Party | Candidate | Votes | % |
|---|---|---|---|
| Democratic | Dina Neal (incumbent) | 4,671 | 72.25% |
| Democratic | Laura Perkins | 1,794 | 27.75% |
| Total votes | | 6,465 | 100% |

Nevada State Senate 4th district general election, 2024
| Party | Candidate | Votes | % |
|---|---|---|---|
| Democratic | Dina Neal (incumbent) | 37,149 | 100% |
| Total votes | | 37,149 | 100% |
| Democratic hold | | | |

=== District 5 ===
Incumbent Republican Carrie Buck has represented the district since 2020.

Nevada State Senate 5th district Democratic primary election, 2024
| Party | Candidate | Votes | % |
|---|---|---|---|
| Democratic | Jennifer Atlas | 5,618 | 66.57% |
| Democratic | Christian Bishop | 2,821 | 33.43% |
| Total votes | | 8,439 | 100% |

Nevada State Senate 5th district Republican primary election, 2024
| Party | Candidate | Votes | % |
|---|---|---|---|
| Republican | Carrie Buck (incumbent) | 6,085 | 77.50% |
| Republican | Richard Auchmoody | 1,767 | 22.50% |
| Total votes | | 7,852 | 100% |

Nevada State Senate 5th district general election, 2024
| Party | Candidate | Votes | % |
|---|---|---|---|
| Republican | Carrie Buck (incumbent) | 42,275 | 53.46% |
| Democratic | Jennifer Atlas | 36,802 | 46.54% |
| Republican hold | | | |
| Total votes | | 79,077 | 100% |

=== District 6 ===
Incumbent Democrat Nicole Cannizzaro has represented the district since 2016.

Nevada State Senate 6th district Republican primary election, 2024
| Party | Candidate | Votes | % |
|---|---|---|---|
| Republican | Jill Douglass | 5,508 | 71.98% |
| Republican | Joshua Stacy | 2,144 | 28.02% |
| Total votes | | 7,652 | 100% |

Nevada State Senate 6th district general election, 2024
| Party | Candidate | Votes | % |
|---|---|---|---|
| Democratic | Nicole Cannizzaro (incumbent) | 37,171 | 51.69% |
| Republican | Jill Douglass | 32,730 | 45.51% |
| Independent American | Brad Lee Barnhill | 2,017 | 2.80% |
| Total votes | | 71,918 | 100% |
| Democratic hold | | | |

=== District 7 ===
Incumbent Democrat Roberta Lange has represented the district since 2020.

Nevada State Senate 7th district general election, 2024
| Party | Candidate | Votes | % |
|---|---|---|---|
| Democratic | Roberta Lange (incumbent) | 29,581 | 58.38% |
| Republican | Leonel Henderson Jr | 21,093 | 41.62% |
| Total votes | | 50,674 | 100% |
| Democratic hold | | | |

=== District 11 ===
Incumbent Democrat Dallas Harris has represented the district since 2018.

Nevada State Senate 11th district Republican primary election, 2024
| Party | Candidate | Votes | % |
|---|---|---|---|
| Republican | Lori Rogich | 2,746 | 63.13% |
| Republican | Brian Martin Paonessa | 1,604 | 36.87% |
| Total votes | | 4,350 | 100% |

Nevada State Senate 11th district general election, 2024
| Party | Candidate | Votes | % |
|---|---|---|---|
| Republican | Lori Rogich | 37,668 | 50.71% |
| Democratic | Dallas Harris (incumbent) | 36,615 | 49.29% |
| Total votes | | 74,283 | 100% |
| Republican gain from Democratic | | | |

=== District 15 ===
Incumbent Republican Heidi Gansert has represented the district since 2018.

Nevada State Senate 15th district Democratic primary election, 2024
| Party | Candidate | Votes | % |
|---|---|---|---|
| Democratic | Angie Taylor | 7,216 | 63.93% |
| Democratic | Naomi Duerr | 3,795 | 33.62% |
| Democratic | Johnny Kerns | 276 | 2.45% |
| Total votes | | 11,287 | 100% |

Nevada State Senate 15th district Republican primary election, 2024
| Party | Candidate | Votes | % |
|---|---|---|---|
| Republican | Mike Ginsburg | 4,218 | 50.76% |
| Republican | Sharron Angle | 3,480 | 41.88% |
| Republican | Mark Neumann | 611 | 7.35% |
| Total votes | | 8,309 | 100% |

Nevada State Senate 15th district general election, 2024
| Party | Candidate | Votes | % |
|---|---|---|---|
| Democratic | Angie Taylor | 39,755 | 54.94% |
| Republican | Mike Ginsburg | 32,607 | 45.06% |
| Total votes | | 72,362 | 100% |
| Democratic gain from Republican | | | |

=== District 18 ===
This seat has been vacant since October 2023, following the resignation of Republican Scott Hammond to become executive director of the Nevada Governor's Office of Workforce Innovation.

Nevada State Senate 18th district Democratic primary election, 2024
| Party | Candidate | Votes | % |
|---|---|---|---|
| Democratic | Ronald Bioldeau | 3,058 | 43.04% |
| Democratic | Iman Joseph | 2,448 | 34.45% |
| Democratic | Donald Conners | 1,599 | 22.51% |
| Total votes | | 7,105 | 100% |

Nevada State Senate 18th district Republican primary election, 2024
| Party | Candidate | Votes | % |
|---|---|---|---|
| Republican | John Steinbeck | 5,458 | 59.58% |
| Republican | Joshua Leavitt | 2,131 | 23.26% |
| Republican | Richard McArthur | 1,572 | 17.16% |
| Total votes | | 9,161 | 100% |

Nevada State Senate 18th district general election, 2024
| Party | Candidate | Votes | % |
|---|---|---|---|
| Republican | John Steinbeck | 46,354 | 56.91% |
| Democratic | Ronald Bioldeau | 35,092 | 43.09% |
| Total votes | | 81,446 | 100% |
| Republican hold | | | |

=== District 19 ===
Incumbent Republican Pete Goicoechea has represented the district since 2012.

Nevada State Senate 19th district Republican primary election, 2024
| Party | Candidate | Votes | % |
|---|---|---|---|
| Republican | John Ellison | 8,273 | 59.60% |
| Republican | William Hockstedler | 3,906 | 28.14% |
| Republican | Chelsy Fischer | 1,702 | 12.26% |
| Total votes | | 13,881 | 100% |

Nevada State Senate 19th district general election, 2024
| Party | Candidate | Votes | % |
|---|---|---|---|
| Republican | John Ellison | 64,727 | 100% |
| Total votes | | 64,727 | 100% |
| Republican hold | | | |

== See also ==
- 2024 Nevada elections
- List of Nevada state legislatures
