= 2022 North Las Vegas mayoral election =

- November 8, 2022
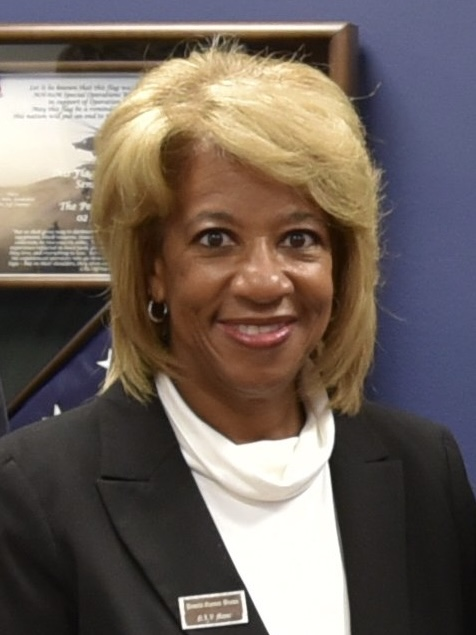
Candidate	Pamela Goynes-Brown	Pat Spearman
Popular vote	40,105	20,928
Percentage	65.7%	32.26%
Mayor before election
John Jay Lee
Elected mayor
Pamela Goynes-Brown

The 2022 North Las Vegas mayoral election was held on November 8, 2022, to elect the next mayor of North Las Vegas, Nevada. Incumbent mayor John Jay Lee retired to run unsuccessfully for governor of Nevada.

== Background ==
In 2017, John Jay Lee was reelected with 80.77% of the vote. He was initially elected as a Democrat, though after more progressive factions took control of the state party in 2021, he switched his affiliation to the Republican Party, and chose to run for Governor of Nevada. With the open seat in a heavily Democratic city, several Democrats saw an opportunity to win the open seat.

== Candidates ==
=== Advanced to general ===
- Pamela Goynes-Brown, city councilor
- Pat Spearman, state senator from the 1st district

=== Eliminated in primary ===
- Jesse Addison III, U.S. Navy veteran
- Nathan Atkins, U.S. Army veteran and businessman
- Gary Bouchard
- Laura Perkins, university regent
- Robert Taylor, small business owner

=== Declined ===
- John Jay Lee, incumbent mayor (ran for governor)

== Primary election ==
=== Results ===
Results
Candidate	Votes	%
Pamela Goynes-Brown	9,762	36.91
Pat Spearman	4,526	17.11
Robert Taylor	3,707	14.02
Nathan Atkins	3,374	12.76
Jesse Addison III	1,851	7.00
Gary Bouchard	1,743	6.59
Laura Perkins	1,485	5.61
Total votes	26,448	100.00

== General election ==
=== Results ===
2022 North Las Vegas mayoral election
Candidate	Votes	%
Pamela Goynes-Brown	40,105	65.71
Pat Spearman	20,928	34.29
Total votes	61,033	100.00

== See also ==
- List of mayors of North Las Vegas, Nevada
