= Mike McGinness =

American politician (1947–2025)

Member of the Nevada Senate from the Central Nevada (18th) district
- In office 1992–2012
- Preceded by: Virgil M. Getto
- Succeeded by: Scott Hammond

Member of the Nevada Assembly from the 35th district
- In office 1988–1992
- Preceded by: Virgil M. Getto
- Succeeded by: Marcia de Braga

Personal details
- Born: April 12, 1947 Fallon, Nevada, U.S.
- Died: February 9, 2025 (aged 77)
- Party: Republican
- Spouse: Dee
- Profession: Manager of radio stations KVLV and KVLV-FM

Mike McGinness (April 12, 1947 – February 9, 2025) was an American politician who was a Republican member of the Nevada Senate, representing the Central Nevada District (map) since 1993. Previously, he served in the Nevada Assembly from 1989 through 1991. In 2010, Senator McGinness was elected by his caucus to serve as the Minority Floor Leader in November. McGinness died after a long illness on February 9, 2025, at the age of 77.
