= Nevada's 4th Senate district =

American legislative district

Coordinates: 36.21°N 115.16°W

Nevada's 4th State Senate district
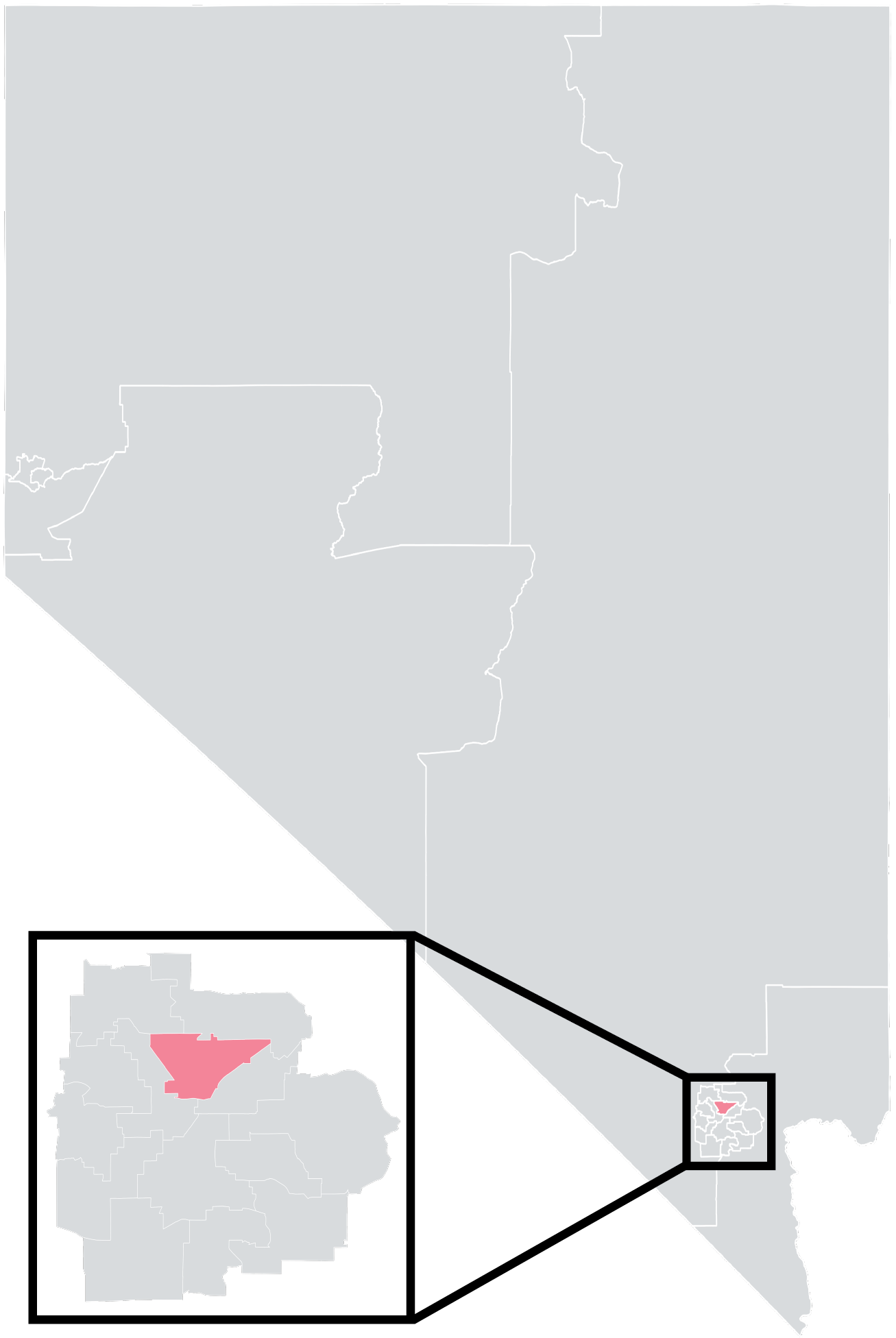
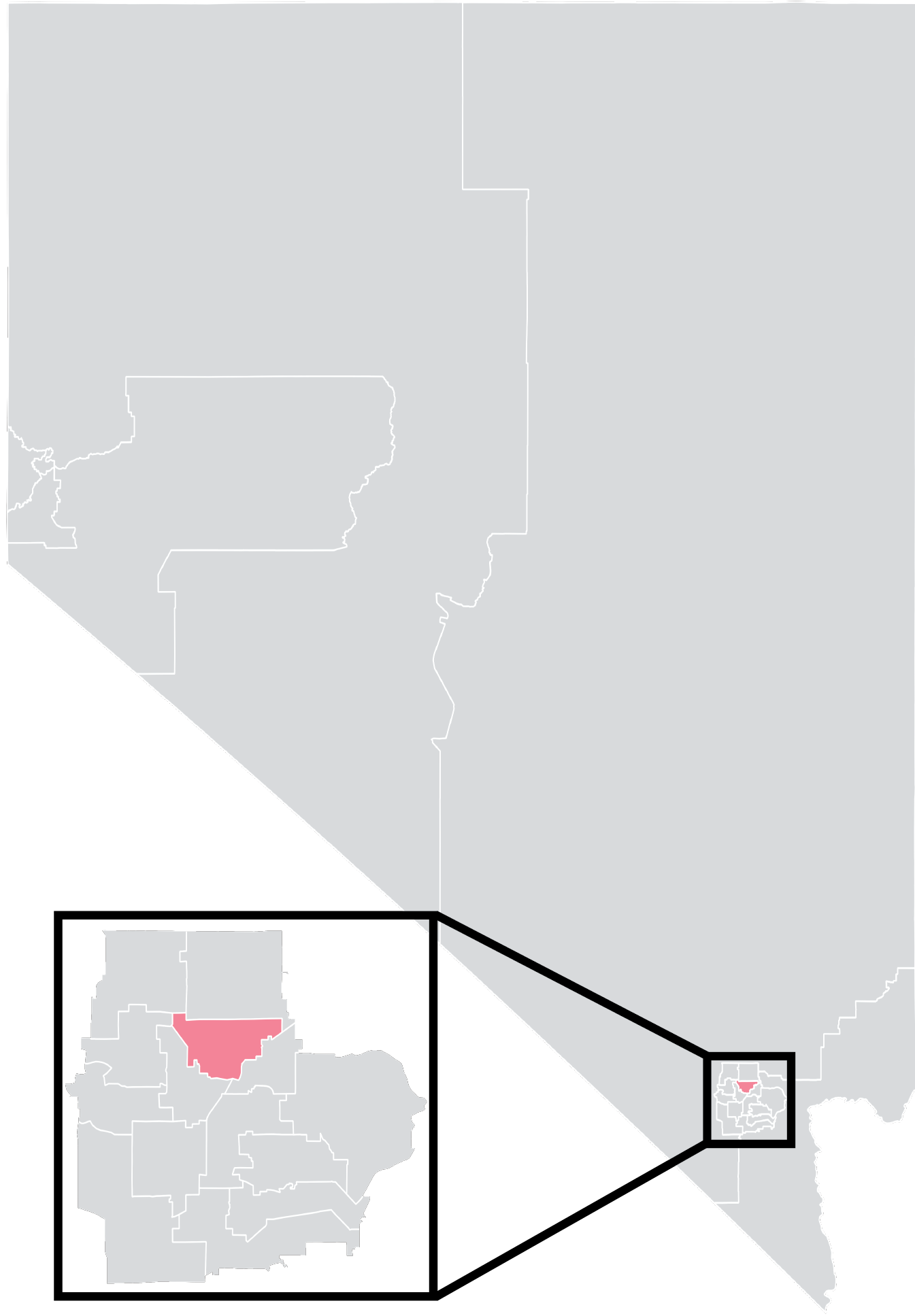
Senator
Dina Neal; D–North Las Vegas
- Registration: 65.0% Democratic; 16.6% Republican; 13.7% No party preference
- Demographics: 18% White; 25% Black; 49% Hispanic; 4% Asian; 4% Other
- Population (2018): 128,947
- Registered voters: 54,821

Nevada's 4th Senate district is one of 21 districts in the Nevada Senate. It has been represented by Democrat Dina Neal since 2020, succeeding appointed fellow Democrat Marcia Washington.

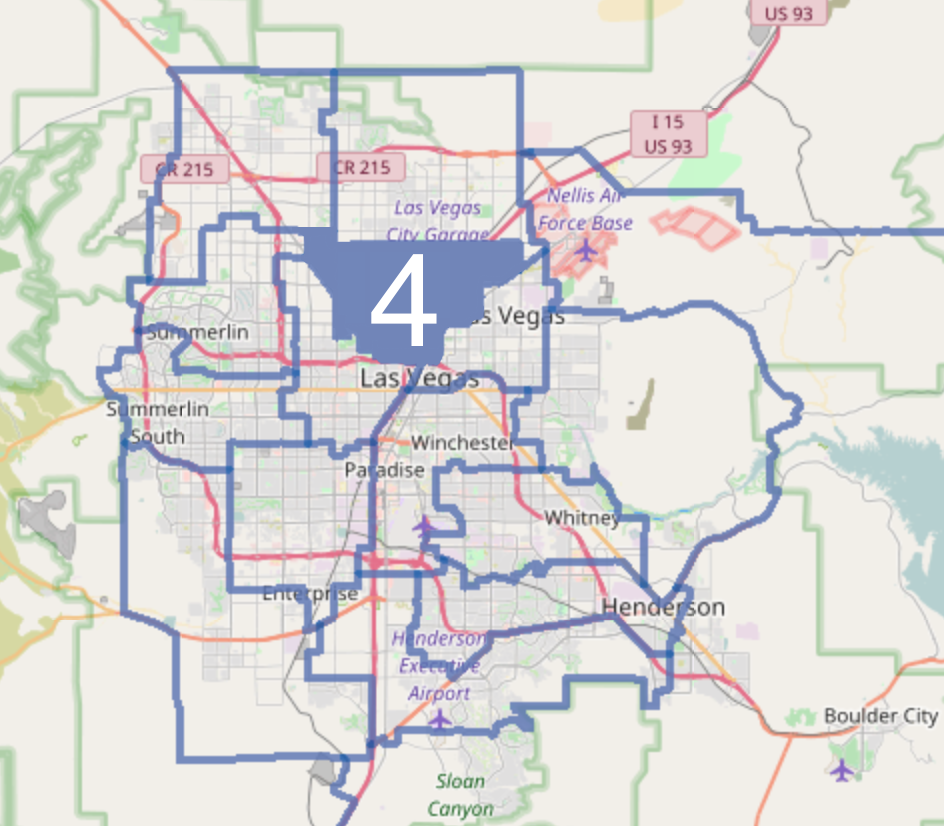
Closeup on the Las Vegas Valley with District 4 colored blue

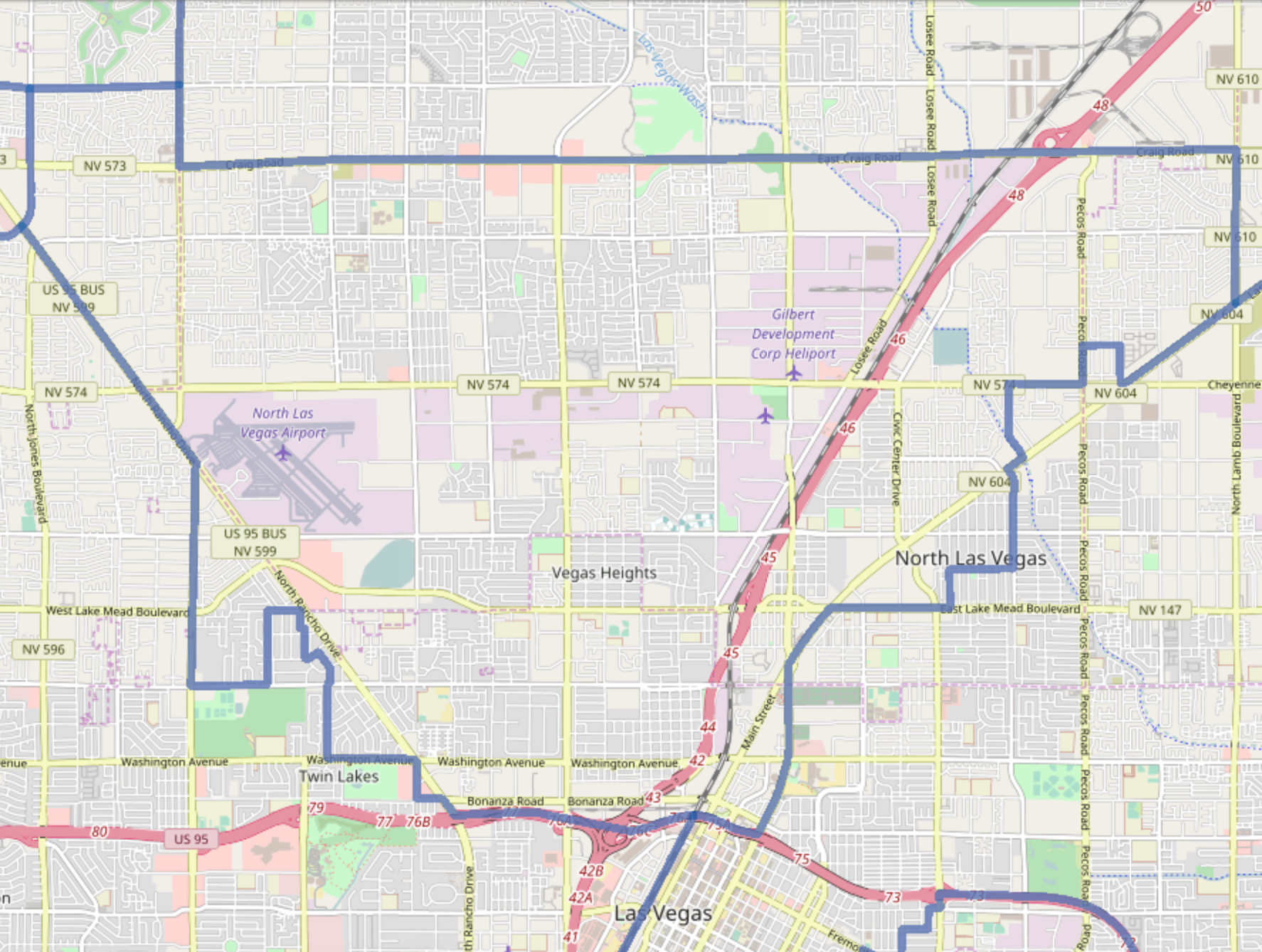
Closeup map of District 4

== Geography and demographics ==
District 4 covers parts of North Las Vegas, Las Vegas, and Sunrise Manor in Clark County; it also includes North Las Vegas Airport.

The district overlaps with Nevada's 1st and 4th congressional districts, and with the 6th and 7th districts of the Nevada Assembly. The district has a total surface area of 25 square miles (65 km^{2}) and a perimeter of 26.6 miles (42.8 km).

According to the 2010 Census, the 4th district had a total of 128,783 inhabitants – 0.14% above the ideal. The district had a large Hispanic and Latino community: over 45% of the district's inhabitants belonged to one of these groups, second only to the 2nd district. The district's population was also low educated. Over 30% of the adult population did not have a high school diploma, and only 6 percent had a bachelor's degree. The median household income was nearly $15,000 lower than Nevada's average, and over a quarter of the population lived in poverty. It had the second-lowest number of registered voters in the state, after District 2.

== Recent election results ==
Nevada Senators are elected to staggered four-year terms; since 2012 redistricting, the 4th district has held elections in presidential years.

=== 2024 ===
2024 Nevada State Senate election, District 4
Party	Candidate	Votes	%
Democratic	Dina Neal (incumbent)	37,149	100
Total votes		37,149	100
Democratic hold			

=== 2020 ===
2020 Nevada State Senate election, District 4
Party	Candidate	Votes	%
Democratic	Dina Neal	31,417	75.3
Republican	Esper Hickman	10,322	24.7
Total votes		41,739	100
Democratic hold			

=== 2016 ===
In 2016, incumbent Kelvin Atkinson faced Stephen Harvey Munford, the son of Assemblyman Harvey Munford, in the primary election. The elder Mumford had previously showed interest in running for the district, but declined. Atkinson vastly out-raised Munford, and won the primary election with two-thirds of the vote. He was unopposed in the general election.

2016 Nevada State Senate election, District 4
Primary election
Party	Candidate	Votes	%
Democratic	Kelvin Atkinson (incumbent)	3,926	66.6
Democratic	Stephen Harvey Munford	1,966	33.4
Total votes		5,892	100
General election
Democratic	Kelvin Atkinson (incumbent)	29,912	100
Total votes		29,912	100
Democratic hold			

=== 2012 ===
In 2012, incumbent Steven Horsford successfully ran for Nevada's 4th congressional district, leaving the 4th Senate district vacant. Three Democrats ran to succeed him: Assemblyman Kelvin Atkinson, businesswoman Katherine Duncan, and parole officer supervisor David Wallace. Atkinson, who was endorsed by the Senate Democratic Caucus, highlighted his own experience, while Duncan noted that Atkinson had to move into the district to run and argued that she knew the community better. Wallace, meanwhile, died of a heart attack a month before the primary, but still appeared on the ballot. Atkinson won the June 12 primary with nearly 70% of the vote.

In the general election, Atkinson faced caretaker and political newcomer Linda West Myers. Atkinson argued that his experience would provide "consistency," while West Myers attacked Atkinson for simultaneously receiving a salary from both the legislature and Clark County after he was fired in 2003. Atkinson nevertheless won with nearly 80% of the vote in the heavily-Democratic district.

2012 Nevada State Senate election, District 4
Primary election
Party	Candidate	Votes	%
Democratic	Kelvin Atkinson	2,646	67.9
Democratic	Katherine Duncan	983	25.2
Democratic	David Wallace	266	6.8
Total votes		3,895	100
General election
Democratic	Kelvin Atkinson	27,422	79.8
Republican	Linda West Myers	6,946	20.2
Total votes		34,368	100
Democratic hold			

=== Federal and statewide results ===
Year	Office	Results
2020	President	Biden 72.2 – 25.6%
2018	Senate	Rosen 75.5 – 20.0%
2018	Governor	Sisolak 73.5 – 20.1%
2016	President	Clinton 74.6 – 20.7%
2012	President	Obama 80.1 – 18.5%
2012	Senate	Berkley 72.7 – 18.2%

== History ==
The 4th district was created during the reapportionment of the districts in 2011 after the 2010 Census was held. The new districts went into effect on January 1, 2012 for filing for office and nominating and electing senators. It became effective for all other purposes on November 7 – the day after Election Day, when the new senator terms began. The borders of District 4 are defined in the Nevada Revised Statutes using census tracts, block groups, and blocks. In the 1960s, the 4th district was a multi-member constituency that covered the entirety of Clark County. Since the 1970 census, it has been based around the Las Vegas Historic West Side and southern North Las Vegas.
