= Kelvin Atkinson =

American politician

Majority Leader of the Nevada Senate
- In office November 8, 2018 – March 5, 2019
- Preceded by: Aaron Ford
- Succeeded by: Nicole Cannizzaro

Member of the Nevada Senate from the 4th district
- In office February 4, 2013 – March 5, 2019
- Preceded by: Steven Horsford
- Succeeded by: Marcia Washington

Member of the Nevada Assembly from the 17th district
- In office February 3, 2003 – November 6, 2012
- Preceded by: Bob Price
- Succeeded by: Steven Brooks

Personal details
- Born: April 8, 1969 (age 57) Chicago, Illinois, U.S.
- Party: Democratic
- Education: University of Nevada, Las Vegas (attended); Howard University (BA)

Kelvin Atkinson (born April 8, 1969) is a former Democratic member of the Nevada Senate, representing District 4. He previously served in the Nevada Assembly, representing Clark County District 17 from 2002 to 2012.

On April 22, 2013, during a debate on repealing Nevada's gay marriage ban, Atkinson announced on the Senate floor that: "I’m black. I'm gay." It was the first time he had publicly identified as gay. He became the fifth openly LGBT member of the Nevada legislature, alongside Senators David Parks and Patricia Spearman and Assemblymembers James Healey and Andrew Martin.

Atkinson and his partner Sherwood Howard were the first same-sex couple to marry in Nevada, which occurred on October 9, 2014.

== Resignation and Federal Charges ==
On March 5, 2019, Kelvin Atkinson resigned amid federal charges accusing him of misusing campaign funds for personal use.

He was later convicted of fraud.

On July 18, 2019, a federal judge ordered Atkinson to serve 27 months in prison and pay $249,900 in restitution for his misuse of campaign funds.

Atkinson ended up getting out of prison in March 2020, due to being high risk during the COVID-19 pandemic.

Nevada Senate
Preceded by Aaron Ford	Majority Leader of the Nevada Senate; 2018–2019	Succeeded by Nicole Cannizzaro
