= Marcia de Braga =

American politician

Member of the Nevada Assembly from the 35th district
- In office November 4, 1992 – November 6, 2002
- Preceded by: Mike McGinness
- Succeeded by: Pete Goicoechea

Personal details
- Born: April 14, 1937 Los Angeles, California
- Died: March 24, 2010 (aged 72) Fallon, Nevada
- Party: Democratic

Marcia de Braga (April 14, 1937 – March 24, 2010) was an American politician who served in the Nevada Assembly from the 35th district from 1992 to 2002.

She died on March 24, 2010, in Fallon, Nevada at age 72.
