= Nevada's 11th Senate district =

American legislative district

Nevada's 11th State Senate district
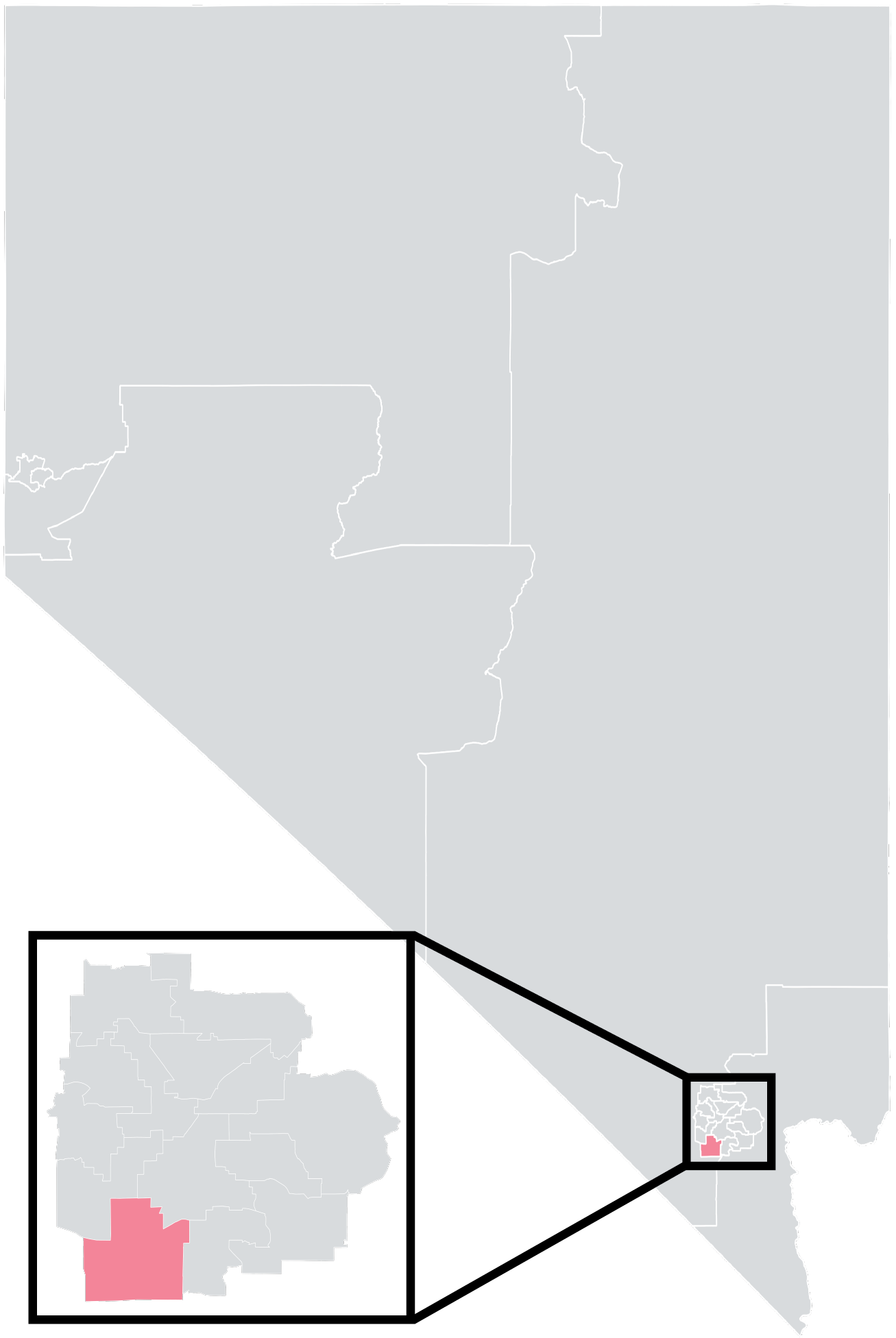
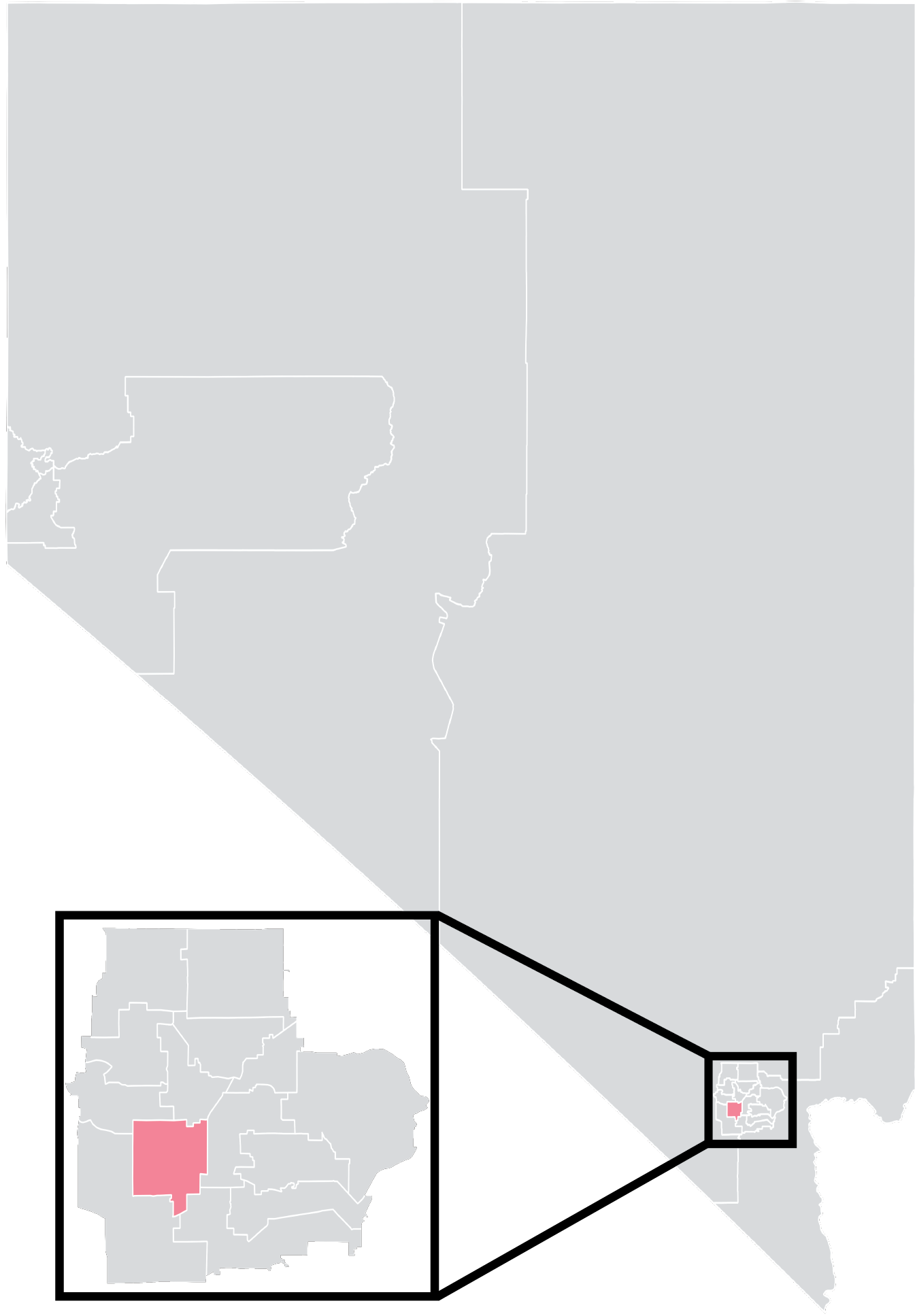
Senator
Lori Rogich; R–Las Vegas
- Registration: 47.2% Democratic; 28.8% Republican; 18.0% No party preference
- Demographics: 35% White; 13% Black; 27% Hispanic; 19% Asian; 1% Hawaiian/Pacific Islander; 4% Other
- Population (2018): 143,756
- Registered voters: 56,530

Nevada's 11th Senate district is one of 21 districts in the Nevada Senate. It has been represented by Republican Lori Rogich since her election 2024.

== Geography ==
District 11 is located in the Las Vegas Valley in Clark County, including parts of Enterprise, Spring Valley, Paradise, and Las Vegas proper.

The district overlaps with Nevada's 1st and 3rd congressional districts, and with the 8th and 42nd districts of the Nevada Assembly.

== Recent election results ==
Nevada Senators are elected to staggered four-year terms; since 2012 redistricting, the 11th district has held elections in presidential years.

=== 2024 ===
2024 Nevada State Senate election, District 11
Party	Candidate	Votes	%
Republican	Lori Rogich	37,668	50.71
Democratic	Dallas Harris (incumbent)	36,615	49.29
Republican gain from Democratic			
Total votes		74,283	100

=== 2020 ===
2020 Nevada State Senate election, District 11
Primary election
Party	Candidate	Votes	%
Republican	Joshua Dowden	3,036	78.9
Republican	Edgar Miron	814	21.1
Total votes		3,850	100
General election
Democratic	Dallas Harris (incumbent)	30,485	58.6
Republican	Joshua Dowden	21,578	41.4
Total votes		52,063	100
Democratic hold			

=== 2016 ===
2016 Nevada State Senate election, District 11
Party	Candidate	Votes	%
Democratic	Aaron Ford (incumbent)	22,439	57.7
Republican	Jon Frazier	14,221	36.6
Libertarian	Lesley Chan	2,229	5.7
Total votes		38,889	100
Democratic hold			

=== 2012 ===
2012 Nevada State Senate election, District 11
Primary election
Party	Candidate	Votes	%
Democratic	Aaron Ford	1,741	68.5
Democratic	Harry Mortenson	802	31.5
Total votes		2,543	100
General election
Democratic	Aaron Ford	22,188	62.3
Republican	John Drake	13,453	37.7
Total votes		35,641	100
Democratic hold			

=== Federal and statewide results ===
Year	Office	Results
2020	President	Biden 57.6 – 40.3%
2018	Senate	Rosen 60.0 – 35.8%
2018	Governor	Sisolak 59.5 – 35.5%
2016	President	Clinton 56.9 – 37.5%
2012	President	Obama 61.5 – 36.7%
2012	Senate	Berkley 54.1 – 36.4%
