= John Steinbeck (politician) =

American politician (born 1971)

Member of the Nevada Senate from the 18th district
- Incumbent
- Assumed office February 3, 2025
- Preceded by: Scott Hammond

Personal details
- Born: 1971 (age 54–55) Santa Monica, California
- Party: Republican
- Spouse: Lynette Steinbeck
- Relations: John Steinbeck
- Education: Western High School, Purdue University Global (BS), and College of Southern Nevada
- Occupation: Politician and firefighter
- Website: www.steinbeckfornevada.com

John C. Steinbeck (born 1971) is an American politician and firefighter who is currently serving as a Republican member of the Nevada Senate, representing the 18th district. He was first elected in 2024, defeating Democratic nominee Ronald Bilodeau.

== Personal life and career ==
Steinbeck was born in Santa Monica, California. He graduated from Western High School, the College of Southern Nevada, and later earned a Bachelor of Science degree from Purdue University Global. He is a former firefighter of the Clark County Fire Department, beginning in 1990. He became fire chief in February 2020 and resigned on January 24, 2025. He was endorsed by Governor Joe Lombardo in 2023.
