= Sig Rogich =

American diplomat

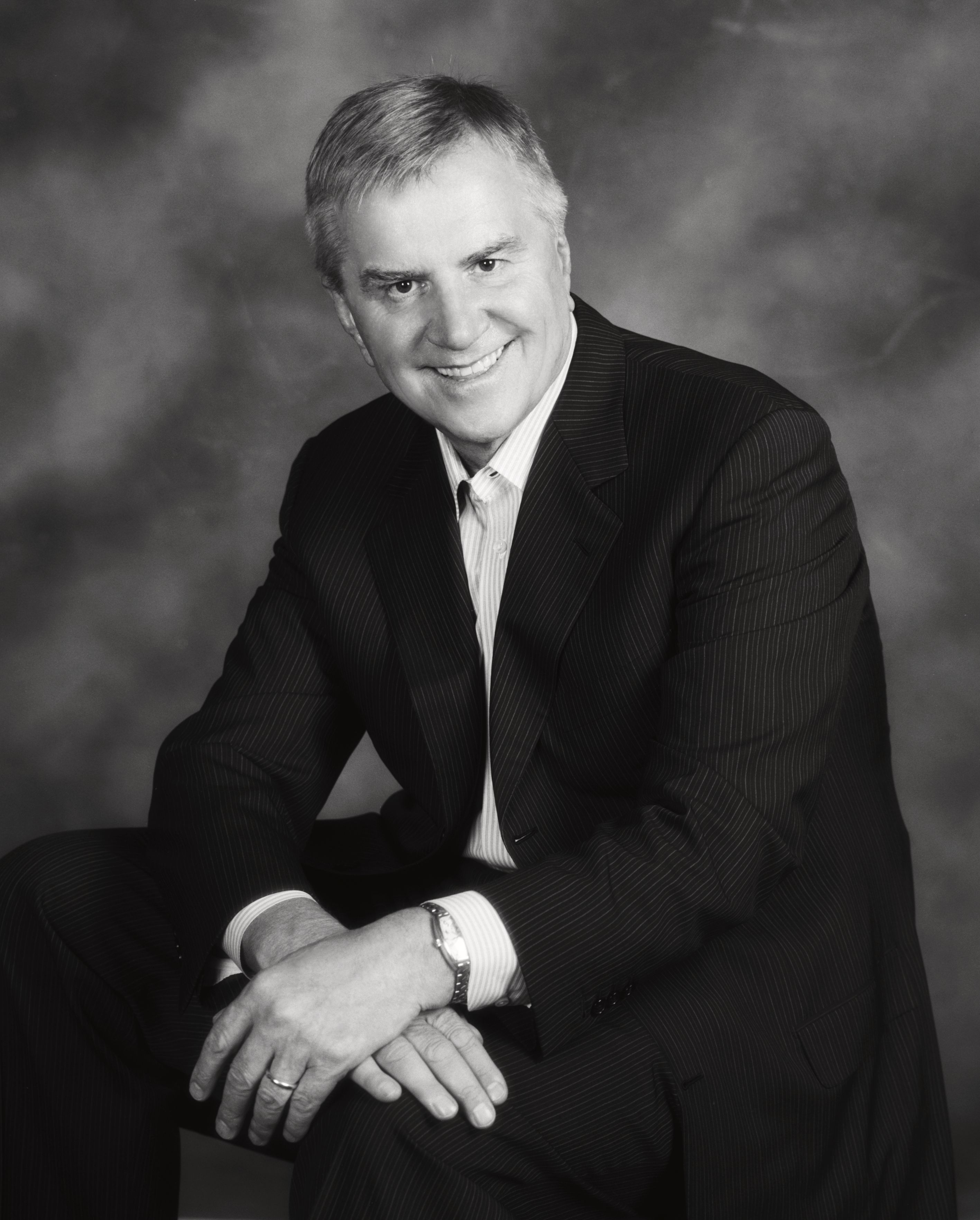

United States Ambassador to Iceland
- In office June 4, 1992 – October 14, 1993
- President: George H. W. Bush; Bill Clinton
- Preceded by: Charles Elvan Cobb, Jr.
- Succeeded by: Parker W. Borg

Personal details
- Born: Sigmund Arnason Rogich; May 17, 1944 (age 82) Vestmannaeyjar, Iceland
- Party: Republican
- Spouse: Lori Rogich
- Education: University of Nevada, Reno
- Occupation: Advertising Executive; Businessman; Adviser; Diplomat

Sigmund Aronson "Sig" Rogich (born May 17, 1944) is an Icelandic/American businessman and is president of The Rogich Communications Group, a business facilitator, public relations, and crisis management firm. He is also a former US Ambassador to Iceland.

Rogich also founded in 1973 Las Vegas based R&R Advertising, now R&R Partners, Nevada's largest advertising and marketing firm, and has been involved with Las Vegas marketing for more than 30 years. His entertainment and business relationships have included Frank Sinatra, Donald Trump, Mike Tyson, Steve Wynn, Kirk Kerkorian, and Sheldon Adelson, among others.

Rogich was a senior media consultant to Republican candidates for office, including Presidents Ronald Reagan and George H. W. Bush. He was senior campaign consultant for former Nevada governors Mike O'Callaghan, Kenny Guinn and Jim Gibbons.

== Early life ==
Born in Iceland, his family moved outside of Las Vegas in 1954 while his father worked in a titanium metals factory. His father went on to be a foreman at a company that made neon casino signs and his sister was a dancer in Folies Bergère, a review that toured with Sammy Davis Jr. Rogich worked odd jobs from the time he was small, and as he got older toiled as a busboy at casinos in Las Vegas, and as a bellman at The Lake Tahoe Hotel. He graduated from Las Vegas High School and studied journalism at the University of Nevada, Reno. While a student, he became a member of the Sigma Alpha Epsilon fraternity in the institution.

== Politics ==
Rogich was a longtime close friend and adviser to Paul Laxalt, former governor and United States Senator from Nevada. In 1984, Rogich was co-director of the "Tuesday Team," an advertising agency created specifically to produce campaign ads for the re-election campaign of President Reagan (a.k.a. Reagan-Bush '84).

In 1987 and 1988, Rogich worked as the director of advertising with Roger Ailes, chief media advisor for Vice President George H. W. Bush's 1988 campaign. He directed, produced and scripted numerous television ads for the campaign (Bush-Quayle '88), as well as others for the Republican National Committee.

Other ads include the famous "Revolving Door" spot for Bush-Quayle '88 (shot at a Utah penitentiary), which highlighted the crime record of Democratic nominee, Gov. Michael Dukakis. Rogich is also credited with devising the Bush ads that prominently featured Michael Dukakis cruising in a tank at a General Dynamics plant in Michigan. George H. W. Bush said, "Roger Ailes and Sig Rogich get credit for that ad - it was the best of all."

Another Rogich spot, "I Remember You," aired by the RNC in July and August 1988, used the 1940s song of the same name as background to a video collage of the Carter years, depicting oil sheiks, gas lines and malaise. Dukakis' lead over Bush—17 points at the end of the Democratic Convention in July—evaporated by the end of the GOP Convention in August. The Wall Street Journal and New York Times gave credit in good part to the unanswered "I Remember You" commercial for eliminating much of that deficit.

Although he supervised the making of many of Mr. Bush's comparative commercials, Rogich insisted he preferred the softer advertisements, like the one of Mr. Bush's granddaughter running into his arms.

From 1989 to 1992, he worked in the West Wing of the White House as assistant to the president for activities and initiatives for President George H.W. Bush. In 1991, at the request of the President, Rogich accompanied former Soviet general secretary Mikhail Gorbachev on his nationwide tour of the U.S.

In 1992, Rogich was named United States Ambassador to his native country of Iceland by President Bush, Sr. Within months, he gave up his appointive post to run the advertising campaign efforts in the latter months of Bush Sr.'s re-election campaign (Bush-Quayle '92) at the request of the President and his chief of staff, Jim Baker.

Rogich was national finance co-chairman for The Republican Governors Association and has served in the same capacity in Nevada for President George W. Bush. He was a Bush Pioneer and an early supporter and senior advisor of longtime friend John McCain in the 2008 presidential contest.

== Communications ==
Before his time in Washington, Rogich founded R&R Advertising in 1973 and built it into the largest advertising agency in Nevada.

Following his time in Washington, Rogich returned to his native Nevada and founded The Rogich Communications Group in 1995. His company has worked with clients both nationally and globally and has been involved with most of the major gaming companies in Las Vegas. Ex-heavyweight champ Mike Tyson hired Rogich to burnish his image after biting Evander Holyfield's ear in their infamous 1997 match. Rogich is a former Nevada Athletic Commission chairman and state boxing commissioner as well as the former CEO of World Series of Fighting (WSOF).

Diplomatic posts
Preceded by Charles Elvan Cobb, Jr.	U.S. Ambassador to Iceland; 1992–1993	Succeeded by Parker W. Borg
