= List of mayors of North Las Vegas, Nevada =

Mayors of the city of North Las Vegas, Nevada, USA

The following is a list of mayors of the city of North Las Vegas, Nevada, United States.

== Mayors ==
- William L. Taylor, ca.1969
- Gene Echols, ca.1971–1973
- Clarence R. "Bud" Cleland, 1973–1976
- Ray H. Daines, 1976–1981
- James Seastrand, ca.1980–1995
- Mike Montandon, ca.2001–2005
- Shari Buck, ca.2012–2013
- John Jay Lee, 2013–2022
- Pamela Goynes-Brown, 2022–present

== See also ==
- 2013 North Las Vegas mayoral election
- 2017 North Las Vegas mayoral election
- 2022 North Las Vegas mayoral election
- North Las Vegas history
