= Nevada's 18th Senate district =

American legislative district

Nevada's 18th State Senate district
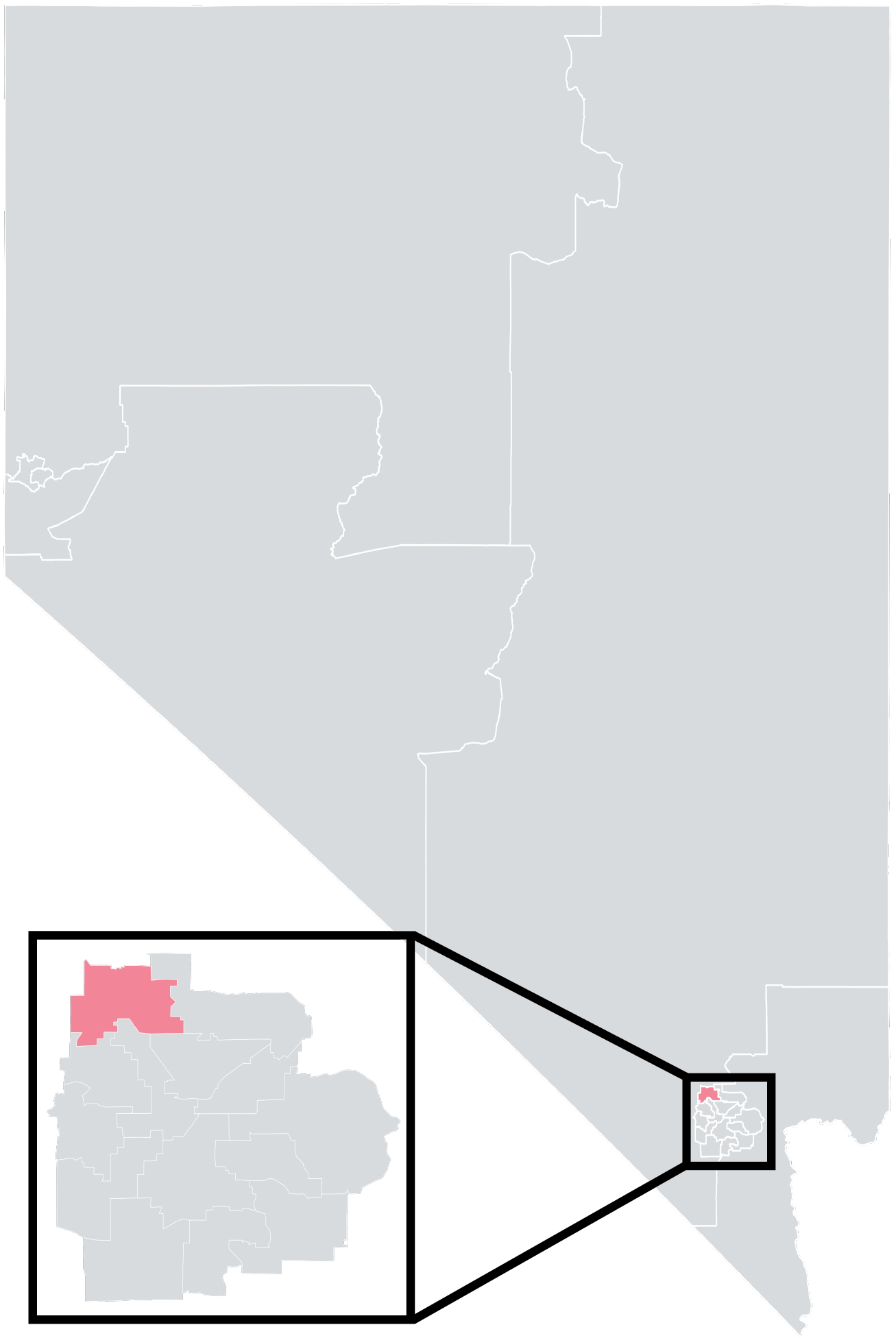
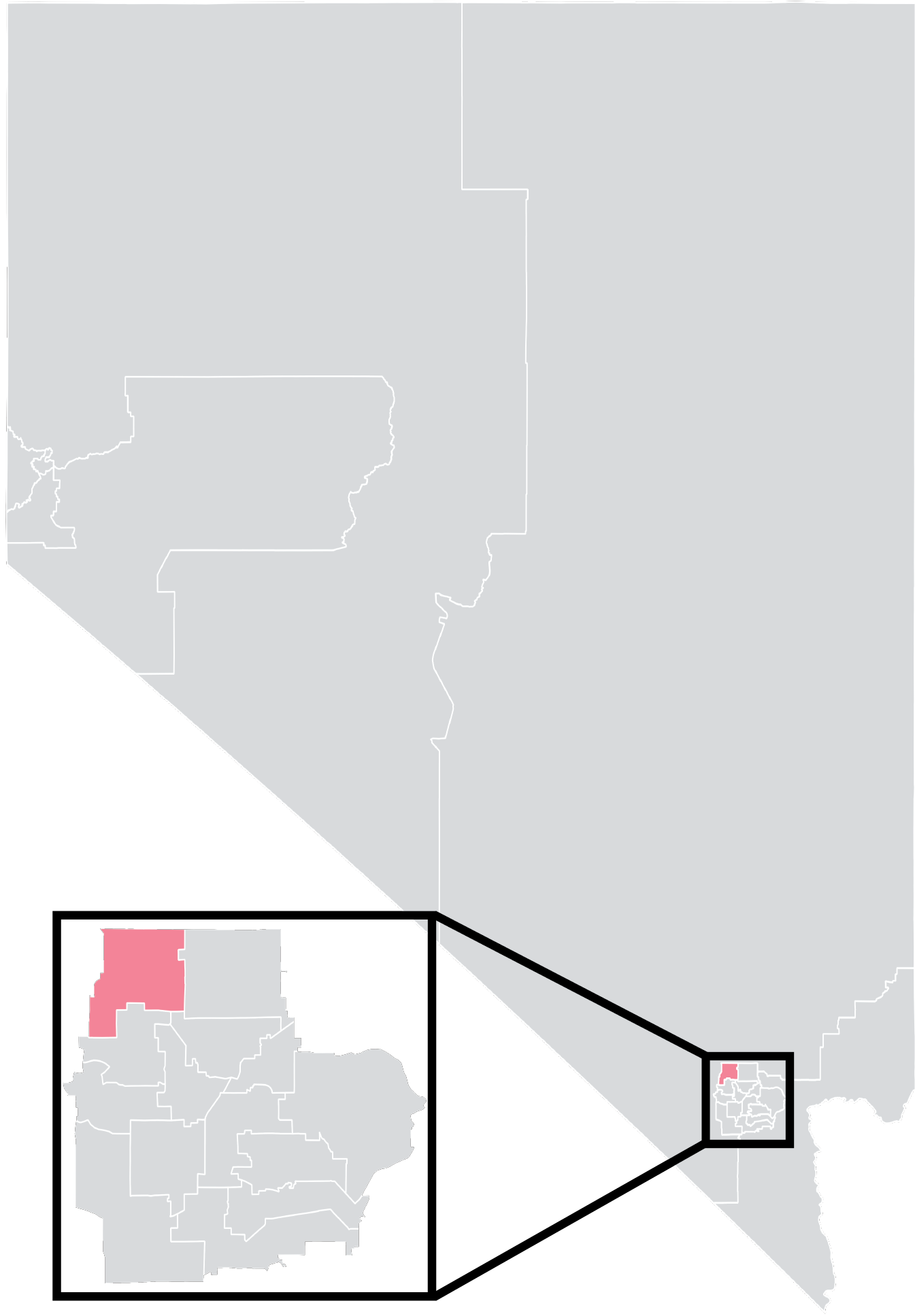
Senator
Vacant
- Registration: 39.2% Republican; 39.2% Democratic; 16.2% No party preference
- Demographics: 61% White; 10% Black; 17% Hispanic; 6% Asian; 1% Native American; 1% Hawaiian/Pacific Islander; 4% Other
- Population (2018): 148,705
- Registered voters: 70,390

Nevada's 18th Senate district is one of 21 districts in the Nevada Senate. It was most recently represented by Republican Scott Hammond from 2012 to 2023.

== Geography ==
District 18 covers the northwestern edge of the Las Vegas Valley in Clark County, including parts of Summerlin and Las Vegas proper.

The district is located entirely within Nevada's 4th congressional district, and overlaps with the 4th and 13th districts of the Nevada Assembly.

== Recent election results ==
Nevada Senators are elected to staggered four-year terms; since 2012 redistricting, the 18th district has held elections in presidential years.

=== 2024 ===
2024 Nevada State Senate election, District 18
Party	Candidate	Votes	%
Republican	John Steinbeck	46,354	56.91
Democratic	Ronald Bioldeau	35,092	43.09
Total votes		81,446	100
Republican hold			

=== 2020 ===
2020 Nevada State Senate election, District 18
Primary election
Party	Candidate	Votes	%
Democratic	Elizabeth Becker	9,725	88.5
Democratic	Ronald Bilodeau	1,265	11.5
Total votes		10,990	100
General election
Republican	Scott Hammond (incumbent)	44,547	56.1
Democratic	Elizabeth Becker	34,849	43.9
Total votes		79,396	100
Republican hold			

=== 2016 ===
2016 Nevada State Senate election, District 18
Party	Candidate	Votes	%
Republican	Scott Hammond (incumbent)	34,805	56.4
Democratic	Alexander Marks	26,864	43.6
Total votes		61,669	100
Republican hold			

=== 2012 ===
2012 Nevada State Senate election, District 18
Primary election
Party	Candidate	Votes	%
Republican	Scott Hammond	2,752	55.9
Republican	Richard McArthur	2,027	41.2
Republican	Conrad Vergara	144	2.9
Total votes		4,923	100
General election
Republican	Scott Hammond	27,364	51.4
Democratic	Kelli Ross	25,893	48.6
Total votes		53,257	100
Republican hold			

=== Federal and statewide results ===
Year	Office	Results
2020	President	Trump 53.3 – 44.6%
2018	Senate	Heller 50.4 – 45.9%
2018	Governor	Laxalt 50.2 – 45.4%
2016	President	Trump 51.9 – 41.6%
2012	President	Romney 51.5 – 46.7%
2012	Senate	Heller 50.1 – 41.1%
