= Richard McArthur =

American politician

Member of the Nevada Assembly from the 4th district
- In office November 4, 2020 – November 6, 2024
- Preceded by: Connie Munk
- Succeeded by: Lisa Cole
- In office November 9, 2016 – November 7, 2018
- Preceded by: Michele Fiore
- Succeeded by: Connie Munk
- In office November 5, 2008 – November 9, 2012
- Preceded by: Francis Allen-Palenske
- Succeeded by: Michele Fiore

Personal details
- Born: 1943 (age 82–83) Lake Forest, Illinois, U.S.
- Party: Republican
- Education: University of California, Davis

Richard McArthur (born 1943) is a Republican politician who was a member of the Nevada Assembly. First elected in 2008, he was defeated in his 2012 primary bid for the Nevada Senate, but he regained his Assembly seat in 2016. McArthur represented the 4th district, which covers parts of the northwestern Las Vegas Valley.

== Biography ==
McArthur was born in Lake Forest, Illinois, in 1943, growing up in Fair Oaks, California. He received his Bachelor of Arts in economics from the University of California, Davis, and served in the Vietnam War as a United States Air Force captain from 1966 until 1972. McArthur worked as a Federal Bureau of Investigation special agent, and now is retired.

McArthur was first elected in 2008, defeating Craig Ballew and two other candidates. Deciding to run for the state Senate rather than reelection to the Assembly in 2012, he faced fellow Assemblyman Scott Hammond in the Republican primary. Hammond, who was seen as more moderate than McArthur, won the primary by nearly 14 points and went on to win the general election.

McArthur sought reelection to his old seat in 2016; it had been vacated by Michele Fiore, who unsuccessfully ran for the United States House of Representatives. He won a three-way Republican primary and narrowly won the general election.

In the 2024 Nevada Senate election, he was defeated in the Republican primary in an unsuccessful bid for District 18.

== Personal life ==
McArthur and his wife, Trish, have 2 children: Kimberly and Michele, and five grandchildren.

== Political positions ==
McArthur supports the right to keep and bear arms. He advocates for deportation of undocumented immigrants residing in the state of Nevada.

McArthur opposes legalization of recreational marijuana, expressing his opposition to Nevada Question 2 (2016), which legalized recreational marijuana in the state. He was rated the most conservative member of the Assembly by the American Conservative Union in 2011.

== Electoral history ==
Nevada Assembly District 4 Republican primary, 2004
Party	Candidate	Votes	%
Republican	Francis Allen	2,327	45.49
Republican	Justin Doucette	1,577	30.83
Republican	Richard McArthur	1,212	23.69
Total votes		5,116	100.00

Nevada Assembly District 4 election, 2008
Party	Candidate	Votes	%
Republican	Richard McArthur	13,740	49.30
Democratic	Craig Ballew	12,719	45.63
Libertarian	Wayne F. Rudolph	792	2.84
Independent American Party (Nevada)	Brad Lee Barnhill	621	2.23
Total votes		27,872	100.00

Nevada Assembly District 4 election, 2010
Party	Candidate	Votes	%
Republican	Richard McArthur	12,156	52.75
Democratic	Gary Fisher	9,536	41.38
Independent American Party (Nevada)	Mark Andrews	1,352	5.87
Total votes		23,044	100.00

Nevada Senate District 18 Republican primary, 2012
Party	Candidate	Votes	%
Republican	Scott Hammond	2,752	55.90
Republican	Richard McArthur	2,027	41.17
Republican	Conrad Vergara	144	2.93
Total votes		4,923	100.00

Nevada Assembly District 4 Republican primary, 2016
Party	Candidate	Votes	%
Republican	Richard McArthur	1,241	43.98
Republican	Kenneth Rezendes	1,134	40.18
Republican	Melissa D. Laughter	447	15.84
Total votes		2,822	100.00

Nevada Assembly District 4 election, 2016
Party	Candidate	Votes	%
Republican	Richard McArthur	16,288	52.01
Democratic	John Piro	15,028	47.99
Total votes		31,316	100.00
