= Marcia Washington =

American politician

Marcia L. Washington

Member of the Nevada Senate from the 4th district
- In office March 15, 2019 – November 4, 2020
- Preceded by: Kelvin Atkinson
- Succeeded by: Dina Neal

Personal details
- Born: 1953 (age 72–73) Tallulah, Louisiana, U.S.
- Party: Democratic
- Spouse: David
- Children: 4, grandchildren 12
- Website: Official website

Marcia L. Washington is an American politician from the state of Nevada. A Democrat, Washington represented the 4th district of the Nevada Senate, covering parts of Las Vegas, North Las Vegas, and Sunrise Manor, from 2019 until 2020.

== Career ==
Prior to serving in the State Senate, Washington worked in the state and Clark County government, including as Clark County fire inspector, in the Clark County School District for 25 years.

== Electoral history ==
In 2019, following the resignation of 4th district incumbent Kelvin Atkinson over corruption charges, Washington was appointed by the Clark County Commission from a field of 11 candidates to fill his seat, beating out more prominent contenders such as Assemblywoman Dina Neal. Washington had been endorsed by the Senate Democratic Caucus and the politically powerful Culinary Local 226. Marcia was elected to the Nevada Srate Board of Education in 2000. She served two terms on the Board of Education through 2008.

Upon her appointment, Washington pledged to serve only as a caretaker, and did not file for re-election in 2020.

== Personal life ==
Washington lives in Las Vegas with her husband David, with whom she has four children.
