= 2024 Nevada elections =

- November 5, 2024

Elections were held in Nevada on November 5, 2024. On that date, the state held elections for U.S. President, U.S. Senate, U.S. House of Representatives, Nevada Assembly, 10 of the 21 seats in the Nevada Senate, and various others. In addition, several measures were on the ballot.

== Federal offices ==
=== President of the United States ===
Incumbent Democratic president Joe Biden was eligible to run for re-election, but has since dropped out; incumbent vice president Kamala Harris was the Democratic nominee. Nevada has six electoral votes in the Electoral College. The Republican nominee, former president Donald Trump, won the state's electoral votes.

=== U.S. Senate ===
Incumbent first-term Democratic Senator Jacky Rosen was elected with 50.4% of the vote in 2018, and won a second term.

=== U.S. House of Representatives ===
Nevada has four congressional districts that elect four delegates to the U.S. House of Representatives. Since the 2016 elections, three representatives have been Democratic.

== State offices ==
=== State senate ===
10 of the 21 seats of the Nevada Senate were up for election. Both Republicans and Democrats flipped one seat. There was no change in partisan makeup of the chamber, and Democrats maintained the majority control of the Senate they have held since 2017.

=== State Assembly ===
All 42 seats of the Nevada Assembly were up for election. Democrats have retained a majority control of the assembly since 2017. Republicans made a gain of one seat and broke the Democratic two-thirds supermajority, but they were unable to make further gains.

== Ballot initiatives ==
As of July 2024, six ballot measures have been certified to appear on the 2024 general election ballot:

- Question 1: a legislative-initiated initiative to remove the constitutional status of the Nevada Board of Regents (similar language as State Question 1 in 2020);
- Question 2: A legislative-initiated initiative to revise language regarding public entities that benefit individuals with mental illness, blindness, or deafness;
- Question 3: Top-Five Ranked-Choice Voting Initiative, a ballot initiative to amend the state constitution to change state and federal elections to use nonpartisan blanket primaries in the first round of elections and ranked-choice voting in the second round among the top five candidates. Amendment was first approved by voters in 2022.
- Question 4: A legislative-initiated initiative to remove a penal exception for slavery and involuntary servitude from the state constitution;
- Question 5: A legislative-initiated initiative to provide a sales tax exemption for child and adult diapers;
- Question 6: Nevada Right to Abortion Initiative, a ballot initiative to amend the state constitution to establish a constitutional right to abortion.
- Question 7: Voter Identification Initiative, amending the constitution to require that Nevada residents present a form of photo identification to verify their identity while voting in person, or to verify their identity using the last four digits of their driver's license or social security number when voting by mail.

Question 1 Results by county No: 70–80%; 60–70%; Yes: 50–60%

Question 2 Results by county Yes: 60–70%; 50–60%; No: 60–70%; 50–60%

Question 3 Results by county No: 60–70%; 50–60%

Question 4 Results by county Yes: 60–70%; 50–60%; No: 70–80%; 60–70%; 50–60%

Question 5 Results by county Yes: 70–80%; 60–70%; 50–60%; No: 50–60%

Question 6 Results by county Yes: 60–70%; 50–60%; No: 60–70%; 50–60%

Question 7 Results by county Yes: 80–90%; 70–80%; 60–70%
