= Lori Rogich =

American politician (born 1965)

Member of the Nevada Senate from the 11th district
- Incumbent
- Assumed office February 3, 2025
- Preceded by: Dallas Harris

Personal details
- Born: 1965 (age 60–61) Union, New Jersey
- Spouse: Sig Rogich
- Children: 3
- Education: Rutgers University (BA) and Rutgers Law School (JD)
- Website: senatorlorirogich.com

Lori Rogich (born 1965) is an American politician and attorney who is currently serving as a Republican member of the Nevada Senate, representing the 11th district. The district includes portions of Clark County. She was first elected in 2024, defeating incumbent state senator Dallas Harris.

== Personal life and career ==
Rogich was born in Union, New Jersey and has three children. She is married to Sig Rogich, who was the senior White House adviser to George H. W. Bush and a campaign adviser for Ronald Reagan and John McCain. She graduated Rutgers University with a BA and Rutgers Law School with a JD. She began her term in the Nevada Senate on February 3, 2025. She won a lawsuit against the Clark County School District in 2021 involving her daughter, who has dyslexia.

== Political positions ==
=== Casinos ===
Rogich introduced a bill to require daily cleaning in Nevada casinos and hotels, primarily to combat illegal marijuana consumption.

=== Immigration ===
Rogich voted with Nevada Democrats to pass Joint Resolution 9, which requested Congress to prevent U.S. Immigration and Customs Enforcement from entering schools and places of worship.
