= 2013 North Las Vegas mayoral election =

North Las Vegas mayoral election, 2013
- April 2, 2013

Candidate	John Jay Lee	Shari Buck	Mike Hunter
Popular vote	4,909	3,248	537
Percentage	53.63%	35.49%	5.87%
Candidate	Sharon Belger
Popular vote	459
Percentage	5.01%
Mayor before election
Shari Buck
Elected mayor
John Jay Lee

The 2013 North Las Vegas mayoral election was held on April 2, 2013, to elect the mayor of North Las Vegas, Nevada. It saw the election of John Jay Lee, who defeated incumbent mayor Shari Buck.

== Results ==
Results
Candidate	Votes	%
John Jay Lee	4,909	53.63
Shari Buck (incumbent)	3,248	35.49
Mike Hunter	537	5.87
Sharon Belger	459	5.01
Total votes	9,153	

== See also ==
- List of mayors of North Las Vegas, Nevada
