= Francis Allen-Palenske =

Nevada politician

Member of the Las Vegas City Council from Ward 4
- Incumbent
- Assumed office December 7, 2022
- Preceded by: Stavros Anthony

Member of the Nevada Assembly from the 4th district
- In office November 2, 2004 – November 5, 2008
- Preceded by: Bob Beers
- Succeeded by: Richard McArthur

Personal details
- Born: 1976 or 1977 (age 49–50) Baton Rouge, Louisiana
- Party: Republican
- Spouse: Steve Palenske
- Children: 3
- Education: University of Nevada, Reno
- Occupation: Restaurant franchise owner/operator

Francis Allen-Palenske (born 1976/1977) is an American elected official in Las Vegas, Nevada.

== Early life and education ==
Allen-Palenske was born in Baton Rouge, Louisiana. Her parents operated various franchise food establishments. She graduated from Galena High School in Reno, Nevada and then earned a B.A. in Political Science and Business from the University of Nevada, Reno. She is of Korean descent.

== Career ==
After school, she worked as a congressional staffer. She was elected as a member of the Nevada Assembly from 2004 to 2008, the first Asian-American woman elected to the Assembly. After her tenure, she owned and operated a Capriotti's sandwich franchise. She returned to public service after winning election to the Las Vegas City Council; she was sworn in on December 7, 2022 representing Ward 4.

== Personal life ==
She is married to Steve Palenske, Fire Captain and 23-year veteran of the City of Las Vegas Fire Department. They have three children and reside in Northwest Las Vegas. She is bilingual, speaking both English and Korean.

== Community involvement and achievements ==
- Speedway Children's Charity, Board Member
- University of Nevada, Reno Alumni Association
- Korean-American Women's Association of Las Vegas, member
- National PTA
- Nevada Republican Network Board Member
- Clark County Republican Party Central Committee
- National Rifle Association of America, member
- Nevada Senior Coalition
