= Dallas Harris =

American politician from Nevada

Member of the Nevada Senate from the 11th district
- In office December 4, 2018 – November 6, 2024
- Preceded by: Aaron D. Ford
- Succeeded by: Lori Rogich

Personal details
- Party: Democratic
- Occupation: Lawyer

Dallas Harris is an American politician from Nevada. A Democrat, Harris was appointed to the 11th district of the Nevada Senate on December 4, 2018, and served until November 6, 2024.

Prior to her appointment to the legislature, Harris served with the Nevada Public Utilities Commission as an administrative attorney.

Harris is openly gay. She is one of four openly LGBT members of the previous Nevada state legislature, alongside senators David Parks, Pat Spearman and Melanie Scheible.
