= Connie Munk =

American politician and counselor

Member of the Nevada Assembly from the 4th district
- In office 2018 – November 4, 2020
- Preceded by: Richard McArthur
- Succeeded by: Richard McArthur

Personal details
- Born: 1951 (age 74–75) Burke, South Dakota, U.S.
- Party: Democratic
- Education: Montana State University (BS)

Connie Munk is an American politician and former counselor, who served as a member of the Nevada Assembly, where she represented the 4th district.

== Early life and education ==
Munk was born in 1951 in Burke, South Dakota. She graduated from Dallas High School in Dallas, Oregon. In 2004, she earned a Bachelor of Science in Human Services from Montana State University.

== Career ==
Prior to her career in politics, monk worked as an addiction counselor, real estate agent, mortgage loan broker, and small-business owner. Munk was elected to the Nevada Assembly in 2018, defeating incumbent Republican Richard McArthur. She represented the 4th district, which covers a portion of Las Vegas. On November 3, 2020, Munk unsuccessfully ran for re-elected, and was defeated by McArthur.
