= Nevada's 19th Senate district =

American legislative district

Nevada's 19th State Senate district
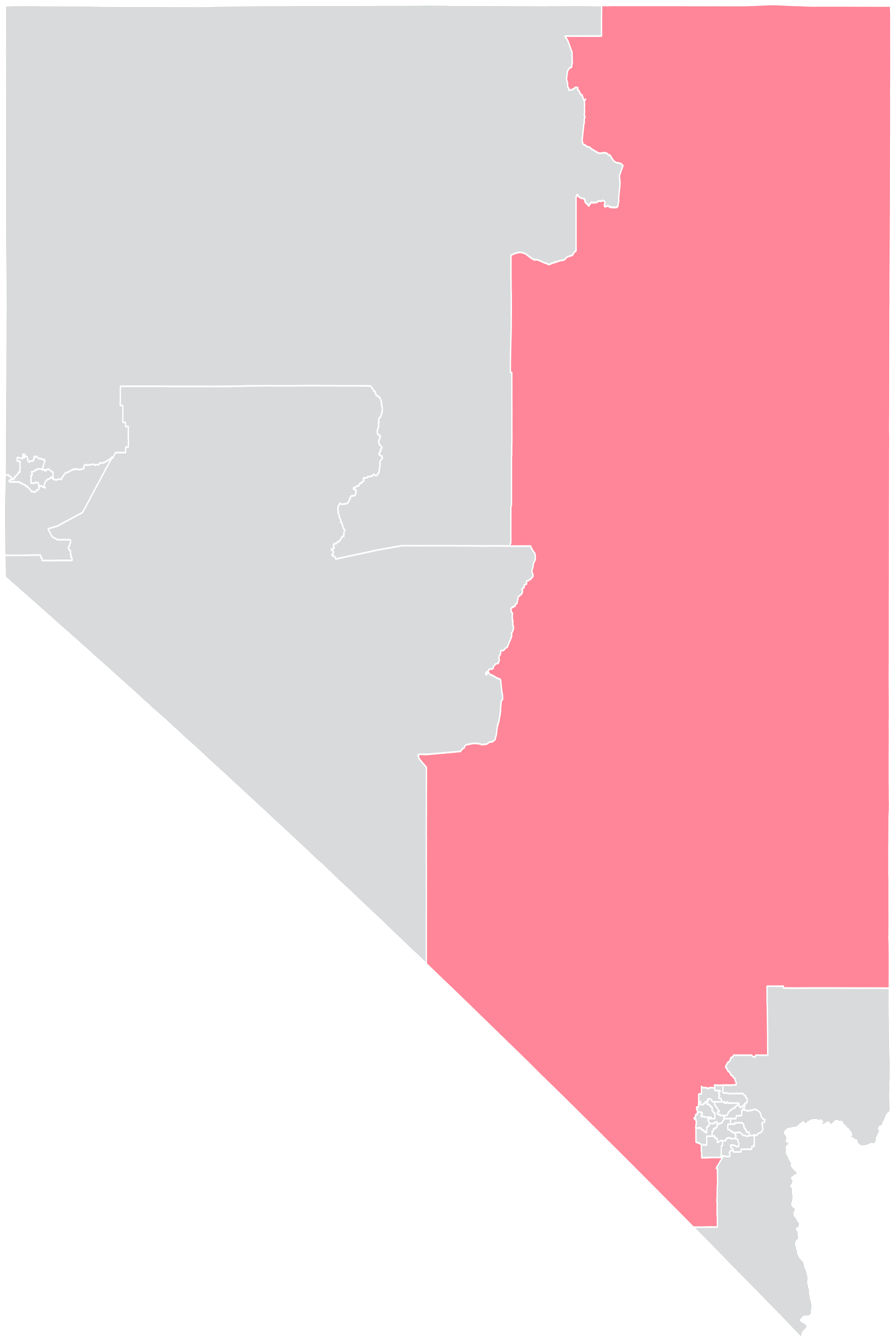
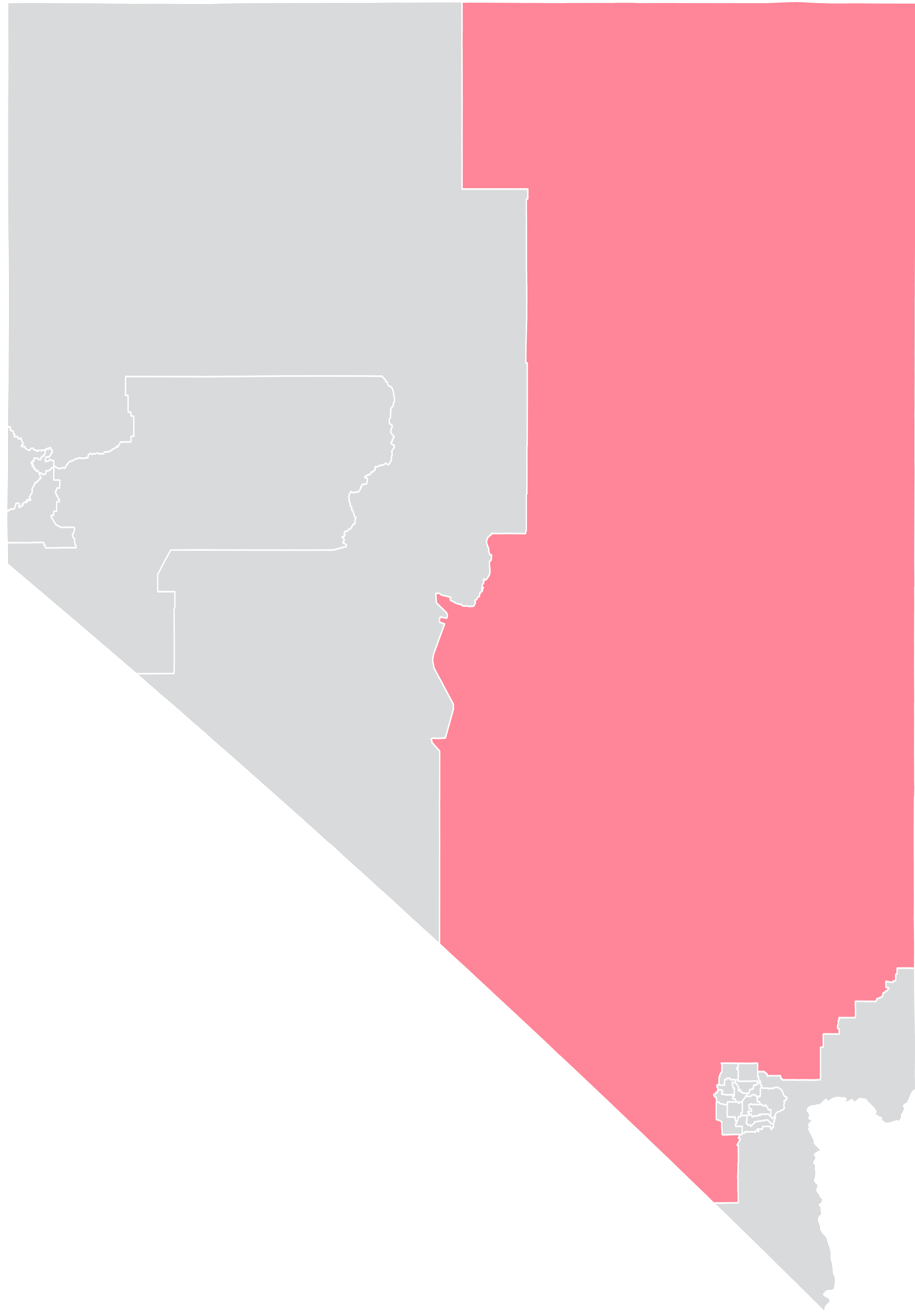
Senator
Pete Goicoechea; R–Eureka
- Registration: 47.9% Republican; 30.8% Democratic; 15.0% No party preference
- Demographics: 69% White; 4% Black; 19% Hispanic; 2% Asian; 3% Native American; 2% Other
- Population (2018): 143,214
- Registered voters: 59,880

Nevada's 19th Senate district is one of 21 districts in the Nevada Senate. It has been represented by Republican Pete Goicoechea since 2013. It is the most Republican-leaning district in the state.

== Geography ==
District 19 covers a vast swath of rural Nevada, including all of Elko, Eureka, Lincoln, and White Pine Counties and parts of Clark and Nye Counties. Communities in the district include Carlin, Elko, Wells, West Wendover, Jackpot, Spring Creek, Eureka, Caliente, Alamo, Pioche, Ely, McGill, Amargosa Valley, Beatty, Pahrump, Round Mountain, Moapa, and Sandy Valley. The district is also home to Area 51.

The district overlaps with Nevada's 2nd, 3rd, and 4th congressional districts, and with the 33rd and 36th districts of the Nevada Assembly. It borders the states of California, Arizona, Utah, and Idaho.

At over 60,000 square miles, the 19th district is the largest district in the state, accounting for over half of the state's total land area, and is in fact the largest state legislative district in the continental United States.

== Recent election results ==
Nevada Senators are elected to staggered four-year terms; since 2012 redistricting, the 19th district has held elections in presidential years.

=== 2024 ===
2024 Nevada State Senate election, District 19
Party	Candidate	Votes	%
Republican	John Ellison	64,727	100
Total votes		64,727	100
Republican hold			

=== 2020 ===
2020 Nevada State Senate election, District 19
Party	Candidate	Votes	%
Republican	Pete Goicoechea (incumbent)	52,591	78.5
Independent American	Tiffany Seeback	14,387	21.5
Total votes		66,978	100
Republican hold			

=== 2016 ===
2016 Nevada State Senate election, District 19
Party	Candidate	Votes	%
Republican	Pete Goicoechea (incumbent)	36,877	73.0
Independent American	Janine Hansen	13,664	27.0
Total votes		50,541	100
Republican hold			

=== 2012 ===
2012 Nevada State Senate election, District 19
Party	Candidate	Votes	%
Republican	Pete Goicoechea	25,287	57.0
Democratic	Harley Kulkin	10,427	23.5
Independent American	Janine Hansen	8,675	19.5
Total votes		44,389	100
Republican hold			

=== Federal and statewide results ===
Year	Office	Results
2020	President	Trump 68.9 – 28.6%
2018	Senate	Heller 67.0 – 27.3%
2018	Governor	Laxalt 65.9 – 25.8%
2016	President	Trump 68.1 – 24.7%
2012	President	Romney 67.2 – 29.8%
2012	Senate	Heller 64.7 – 24.7%

== History ==
District 19 was created when the senatorial districts were redrawn in 2011 as a result of the 2010 census. The new districts went into effect on January 1, 2012, for filing for office, and for nominating and electing senators. They became effective for all other purposes on November 7 of the same year – the day after Election Day, when the new terms began. The law defines District 19's borders using census tracts, block groups, and blocks.

=== Rural Senatorial District ===
Most of the district was previously in the Rural Senatorial District. After the 1991 redistricting the rural district encompassed Humboldt, Pershing and Elko Counties as well as parts of Lander and Eureka Counties. After the 2000 census the district also encompassed all of Lander, Eureka, White Pine and Lincoln Counties as well as parts of Nye County.
