= Nevada's 1st Senate district =

American legislative district

Coordinates: 36.28°N 115.14°W

Nevada's 1st State Senate district
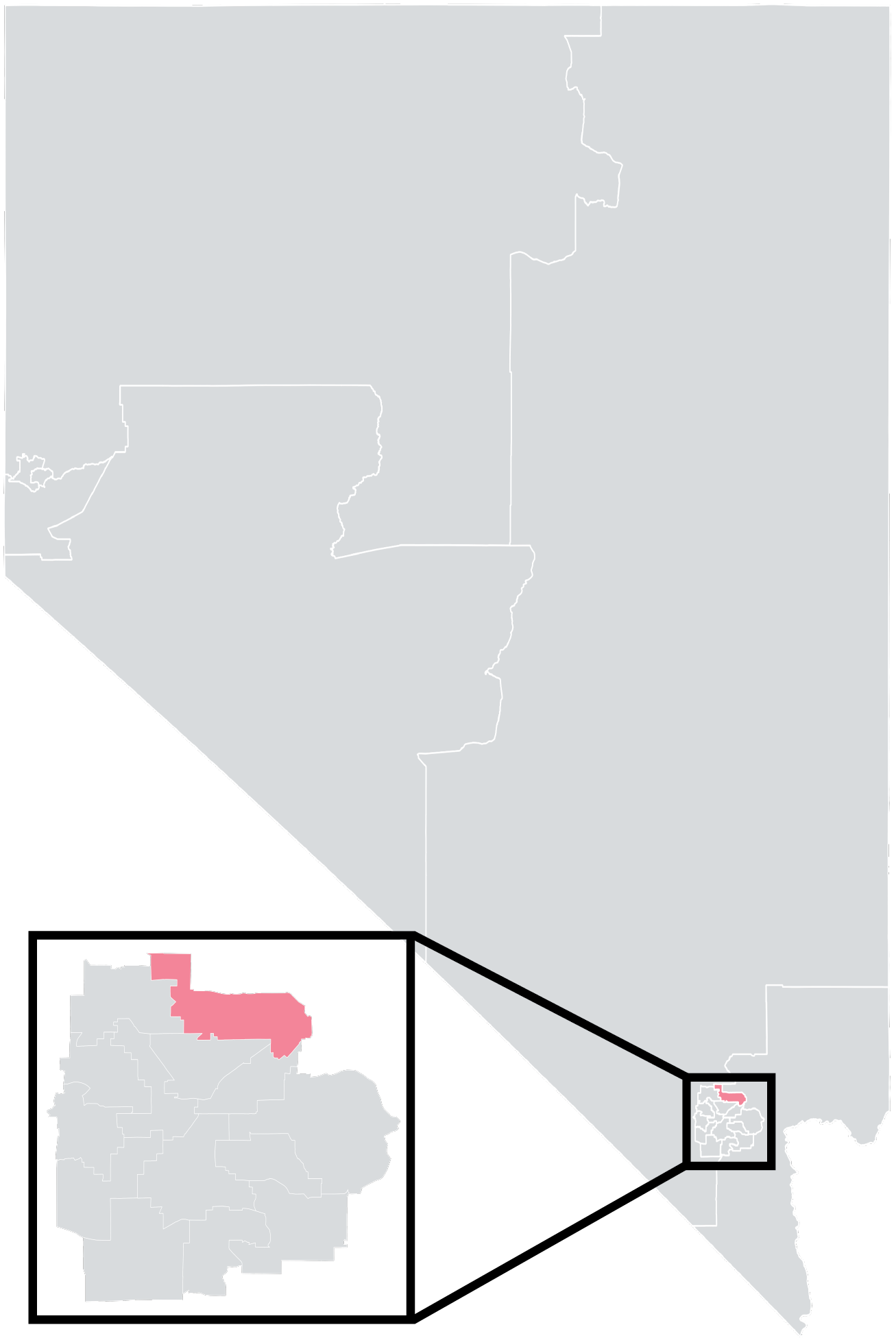
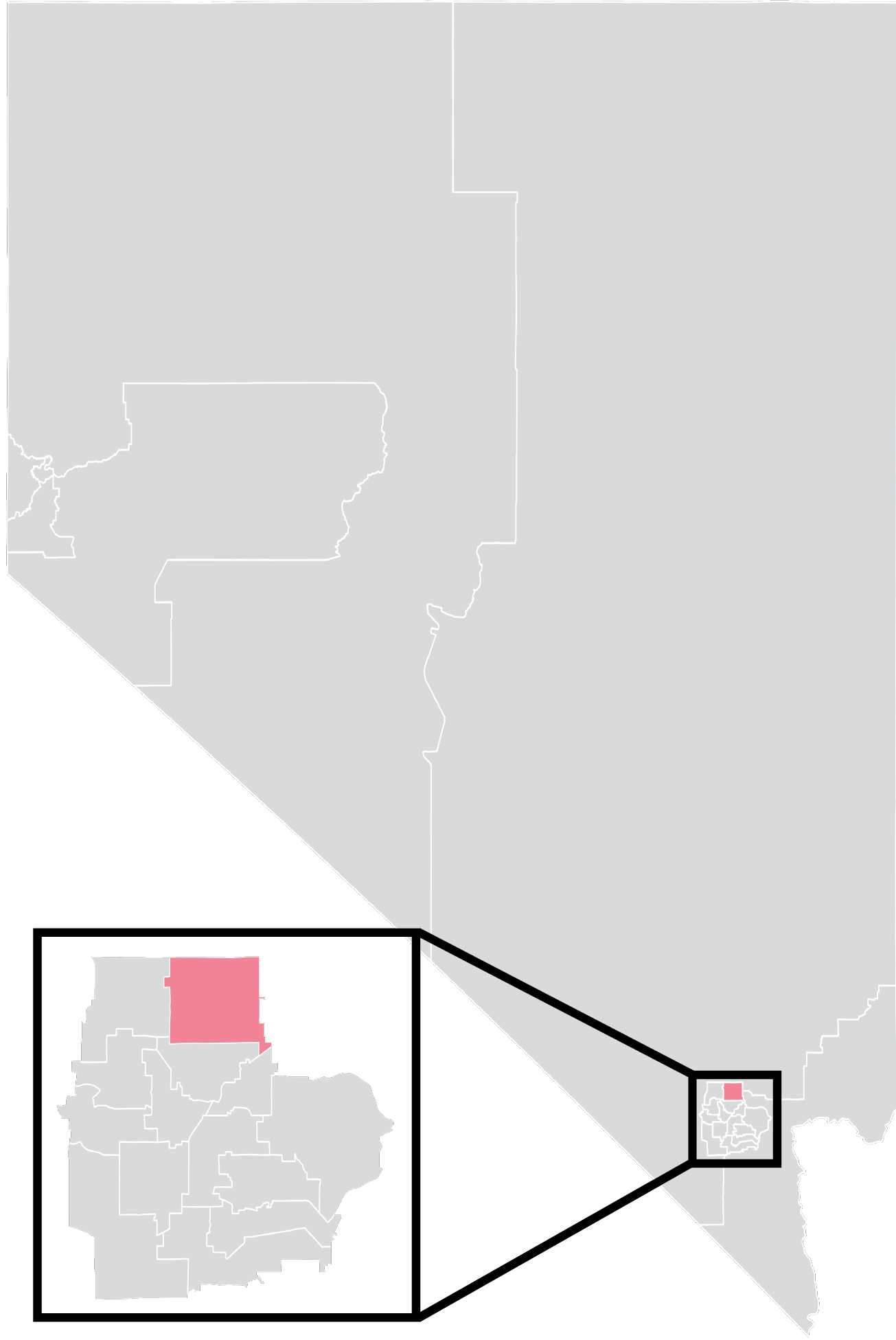
Senator
Michelee Crawford; D–North Las Vegas
- Registration: 49.5% Democratic; 28.4% Republican; 16.6% No party preference
- Demographics: 34% White; 20% Black; 32% Hispanic; 7% Asian; 6% Other
- Population (2018): 151,867
- Registered voters: 59,500

Nevada's 1st Senate district is one of 21 districts in the Nevada Senate. It has been represented by Democrat Michelee Crawford since 2024. It was previously held by Democrat Pat Spearman from 2012 to 2024.

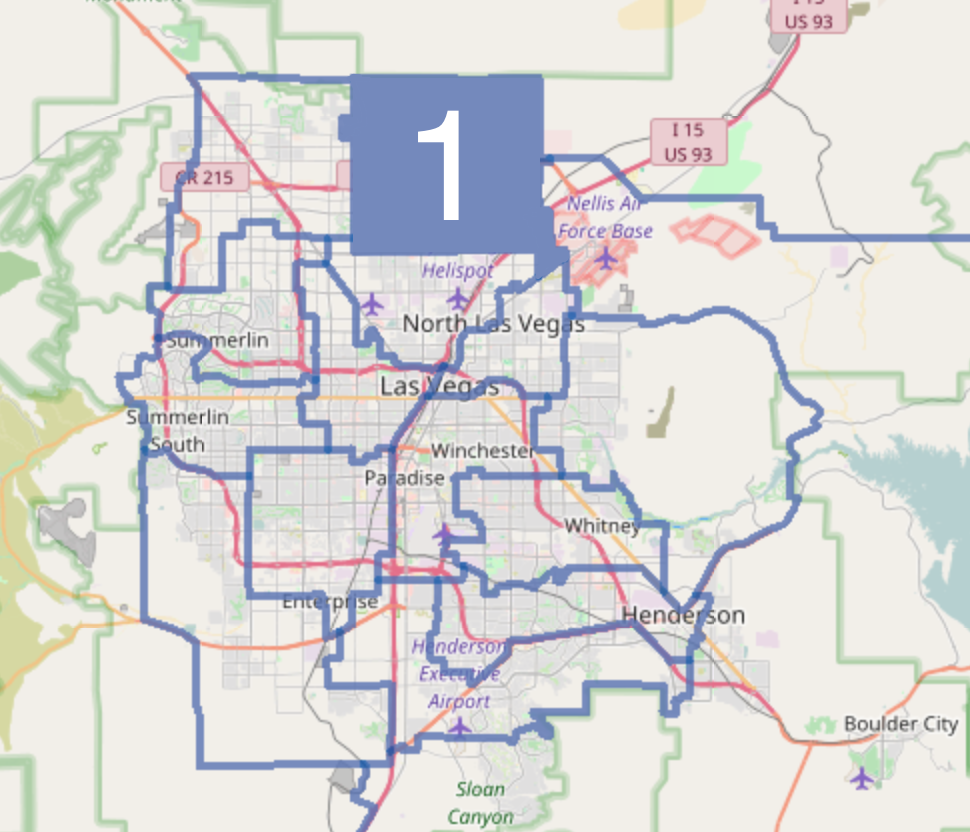
Closeup on the Las Vegas Valley with District 1 colored blue

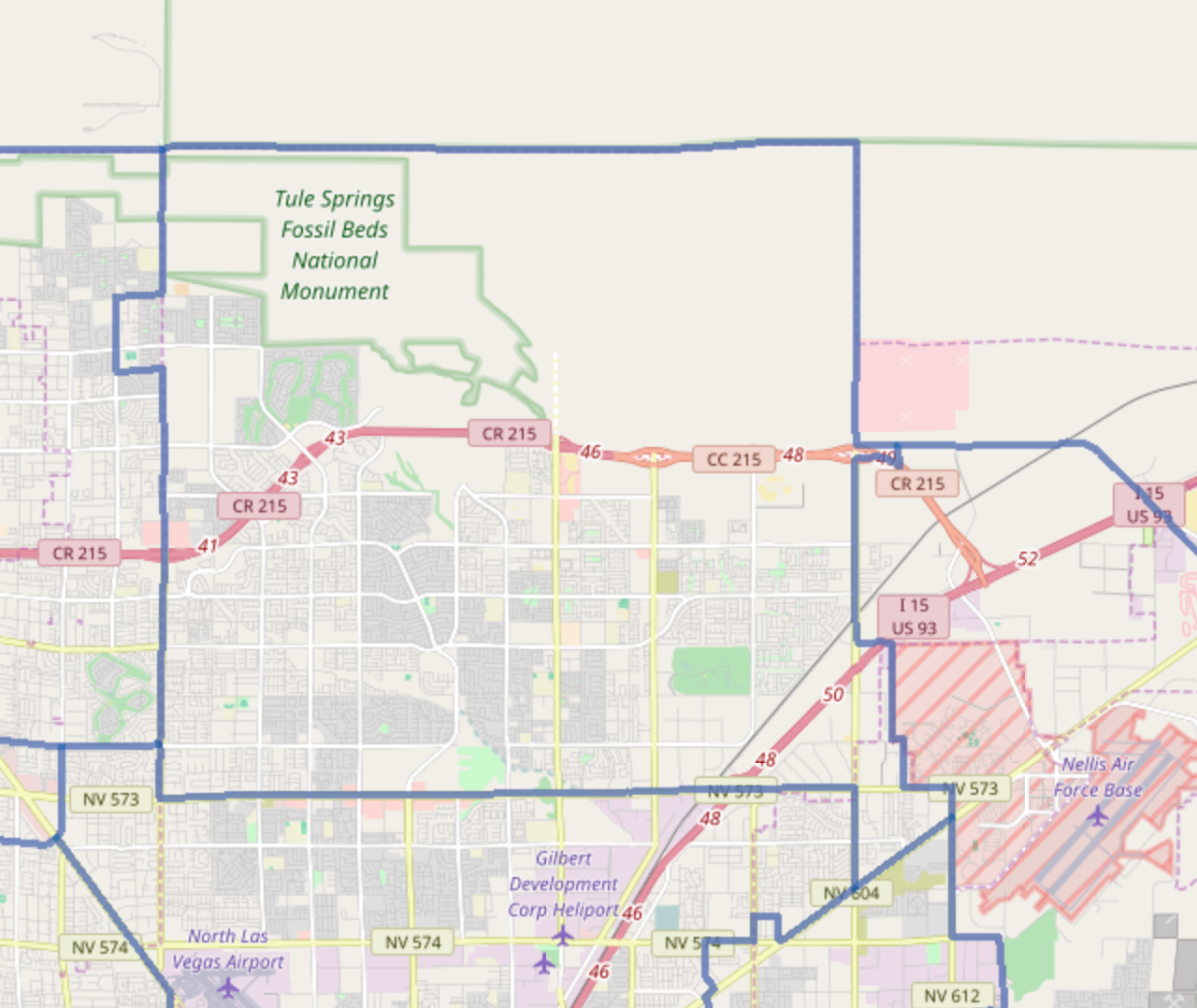
Closeup map of District 1

== Geography and demographics ==
District 1 is located just north of Las Vegas in Clark County, including much of North Las Vegas and smaller sections of Sunrise Manor and Las Vegas itself.

The district is entirely located within Nevada's 4th congressional district, and overlaps with the 1st and 17th districts of the Nevada Assembly. It has a surface area of 48.5 square miles (126 km^{2}) and a perimeter of 33 miles (53 km).

According to the 2010 Census, the district had a population of 128,861 – 0.2% below the ideal – which has since increased. Compared to other districts in the Senate, District 1 has the third smallest solely white population and the largest population of African Americans. The district has a younger population than average with nearly 65% of the population below the age of 40. The median household income in the district is almost $10,000 above the Nevada average, while the poverty rate is 10.5%.

== Recent election results ==
Nevada Senators are elected to staggered four-year terms; since 2012 redistricting, the 1st district has held elections in presidential years.

=== 2024 ===
2024 Nevada State Senate election, District 1
Party	Candidate	Votes	%
Democratic	Michelee Crawford	40,066	58.97
Republican	Patricia Brinkley	27,880	41.03
Total votes		67,946	100
Democratic hold			

=== 2020 ===
2020 Nevada State Senate election, District 1
Party	Candidate	Votes	%
Democratic	Pat Spearman (incumbent)	51,648	100
Total votes		51,648	100
Democratic hold			

=== 2016 ===
In 2016, Spearman faced entrepreneur and political newcomer Arsen Ter-Petrosyan. Neither faced opponents in their respective primaries. Spearman won the election with over 65% of the vote.

2016 Nevada State Senate election, District 1
Party	Candidate	Votes	%
Democratic	Pat Spearman (incumbent)	33,688	65.4
Republican	Arsen Ter-Petrosyan	17,800	34.6
Total votes		51,488	100
Democratic hold			

=== 2012 ===
In the 2012 Democratic primary, two-term incumbent John Jay Lee was challenged by veteran and former evangelical minister Pat Spearman. Spearman, who is LGBT, had never previously held political office and argued that the district needed a "real Democrat." Lee, a Mormon who opposed gay marriage, said he wasn't worried by Spearman, as he thought Spearman had been "encouraged to run by supporters of single issues like gay rights." Spearman won the primary with 63% of the vote.

No Republican filed for the seat, and Spearman's lone opponent was Gregory Hughes, a member of the Independent American Party, whom she defeated easily.

2012 Nevada State Senate election, District 1
Primary election
Party	Candidate	Votes	%
Democratic	Pat Spearman	2,244	63.0
Democratic	John Jay Lee (incumbent)	1,318	37.0
Total votes		3,562	100
General election
Democratic	Pat Spearman	29,026	68.7
Independent American	Gregory Hughes	13,221	31.3
Total votes		42,247	100
Democratic hold			

=== Federal and statewide results ===
Year	Office	Results
2020	President	Biden 58.5 – 35.4%
2018	Senate	Rosen 60.1 – 37.5%
2018	Governor	Sisolak 60.2 – 34.4%
2016	President	Clinton 58.5 – 35.4%
2012	President	Obama 62.7 – 35.8%
2012	Senate	Berkley 55.4 – 35.0%

== History ==
District 1 was created when the senatorial districts were redrawn in 2011 as a result of the 2010 Census. The new districts went into effect on January 1, 2012 for filing for office, and for nominating and electing senators. They became effective for all other purposes on November 7 of the same year – the day after Election Day, when the new terms began. The law defines the borders District 1 using census tracts, block groups, and blocks. Since its creation, two elections have been held in the district. Most of the district was previously in the districts Clark County 1 and Clark County 12.

=== Clark County District 1 ===
From the 1960s to the 1980s, the district was based along the Colorado River and Henderson, which are now the 12th and 5th districts respectively. In the 1990s, it consisted of all Clark County outside of the Las Vegas Valley, including Indian Springs, Boulder City, Sandy Valley, and Mesquite.

== List of representatives ==
Representative	Party	Years	Legislative Session	District Home	Notes
District created		October 2011			renamed (formerly Clark County 1)
Pat Spearman	Democratic	Jan 2013-	77th-	North Las Vegas	Defeat incumbent Democrat John Jay Lee
