= Dean Rhoads =

American politician

Member of the Nevada Senate from the Rural Nevada (19th) district
- In office 1984–2012
- Preceded by: Norman Glaser
- Succeeded by: Pete Goicoechea

Member of the Nevada Assembly from the 33rd district
- In office 1976 - 1982
- Preceded by: Roy Young
- Succeeded by: Byron "Bill" Biyleu

Personal details
- Born: October 5, 1935 (age 90) Tonasket, Washington
- Died: April 24, 2018
- Party: Republican
- Spouse: Sharon
- Education: California State Polytechnic College
- Profession: rancher

Dean Rhoads (born 1935) is a former Republican member of the Nevada Senate, representing the Northern Nevada District (map) from 1984 until 2012. Previously he served in the Nevada Assembly from 1976 through 1982. In October 2010, Senator Rhoads broke with the Republican establishment to endorse Harry Reid over Sharron Angle in that year's Senate Race.

He was on the board of directors of the American Legislative Exchange Council (ALEC), a conservative lobbying group.

Jon Ralston, Nevada's leading political journalist, described Rhoads as a "consummate rural lawmaker", and "one of the most principled in history".

== Personal information ==
Rhoads was born in Tonasket, Washington.

== Family ==
Rhoads is married to his wife Sharon and together they have 2 children: Shammy, Chandra.

== Education ==
Rhoads obtained his BS in Agriculture Business Management from California State Polytechnic College.

== Organizations ==
Dean Rhoads is a member of many organizations which include:

- Director of the American Legislative Exchange Council
- Member of the Nevada Cattlemens Association
- Member of the Nevada Taxpayers Association
- Member of the Rotary Club
