= Virgil M. Getto =

American politician

Member of the Nevada General Assembly from the 35th district
- In office 1966–1976; 1978–1980; 1982–1988

Member of the Nevada Senate from the 18th district
- In office 1980–1982; 1988–1992

Personal details
- Born: June 19, 1924 Fallon, Nevada, United States
- Died: November 6, 2014 (aged 91) Fallon, Nevada, United States
- Party: Republican
- Spouse(s): Barbara Ann Mason (div.); Patricia Stark Heiss
- Profession: dairy farmer

Virgil M. Getto (June 19, 1924 – November 6, 2014) was an American politician who was a Republican member of the Nevada General Assembly. He served as Minority Leader of the Assembly in 1975. Getto is a member of the Nevada State Assembly Wall of Distinction. A son of Italian immigrants, Getto was a dairy farmer. He was also a member of the National Future Farmers of America in his younger years.
