= 2012 Nevada elections =

- November 6, 2012

Elections were held in Nevada on November 6, 2012. On that date, the state held elections for U.S. President, U.S. Senate, U.S. House of Representatives, Nevada Assembly, and various others. In addition, 12 of the 21 seats in the Nevada Senate were up for election, and one measure was on the ballot. Primary elections were held on June 12, 2012.

== Federal ==
=== Presidential ===
Nevada voters will choose 6 representatives to the Electoral College who will vote for the president and vice-president of the United States. Candidates with ballot access are Barack Obama/Joe Biden (Democrat), Mitt Romney/Paul Ryan (Republican), Gary Johnson/Jim Gray (Libertarian), Virgil Goode (independent).

=== Senate ===
Incumbent Republican U.S. Senator Dean Heller, who was first appointed to the position in May 2011, is seeking a full term. His challenger is Democratic U.S. Representative Shelley Berkley.

=== House of Representatives ===
All four Congressional seats are up for election. The Nevada House delegation currently consists of 2 Republicans and 1 Democrat. The fourth seat was created from reapportionment following the 2010 United States census. Candidates with ballot access are Barack Obama/Joe Biden (Democrat), Mitt Romney/Paul Ryan (Republican), Gary Johnson/Jim Gray (Libertarian), Virgil Goode (independent).

== State ==
=== Legislature ===
==== Senate ====
12 out of the 21 seats in the Nevada Senate are up for election. The state Senate currently consists of 10 Democrats, 9 Republicans, and 2 vacancies.

Open seats
District 1 (old Clark 1): Democratic incumbent John Jay Lee was defeated in the primary.

District 3 (old Clark 3): Democratic incumbent Valerie Wiener is term-limited.

District 4 (old Clark 4): Democratic incumbent and Majority Leader Steven Horsford is seeking the 4th congressional district seat.

District 5 (old Clark 5A): Democratic incumbent Shirley Breeden is retiring.

District 6 (old Clark 6): Democratic incumbent Allison Copening is retiring.

District 9 (old Clark 9): Republican Elizabeth Halseth held the seat until her resignation in February 2012; a special election will be held for the remainder of her term.

District 11 (old Clark 11): Democratic incumbent Michael A. Schneider is term-limited.

District 13 (old Washoe 1): Democratic Sheila Leslie held the seat until her resignation in February 2012 to run for the District 15 state Senate seat; a special election will be held for the remainder of her term in this district.

District 18: This is a new seat, with no current incumbent.

District 19 (old Rural Nevada): Republican incumbent Dean Rhoads is term-limited.

==== Assembly ====
All 42 seats of the Nevada Assembly are up for election. The state Assembly currently consists of 26 Democrats and 16 Republicans.

Open seats
District 4: Republican incumbent Richard McArthur unsuccessfully sought the District 18 state Senate seat.

District 9: Democratic incumbent Richard "Tick" Segerblom is seeking the District 3 state Senate seat.

District 13: Republican incumbent Scott Hammond is seeking the District 18 state Senate seat.

District 16: Democratic incumbent and Assembly Speaker John Oceguera is term-limited.

District 20: This is a new seat, with no current incumbent.

District 21: Republican incumbent Mark Sherwood is retiring.

District 30: Democratic incumbent and Speaker Pro Tempore Debbie Smith is seeking the District 13 state Senate seat.

District 35: Republican incumbent and Minority Leader Pete Goicoechea is seeking the District 19 state Senate seat.

District 36: Republican incumbent Ed Goedhart is retiring.

District 39: Republican incumbent Kelly Kite was defeated in the primary.

=== Ballot Measure ===
Question 1 would allow for the Nevada Legislature to call itself into a special session under extenuating circumstances, if approved by two-thirds of all legislators.

Question 1 results by county Yes: 50–60%; No: 70–80%; 50–60%
