= 2017 North Las Vegas mayoral election =

North Las Vegas mayoral election, 2017
- April 4, 2017

Candidate	John Jay Lee	Gary Bouchard	Taylor DeQuincy
Popular vote	6,724	849	752
Percentage	80.77%	10.20%	9.03%
Mayor before election
John Jay Lee
Democratic
Elected mayor
John Jay Lee
Democratic

The 2017 North Las Vegas mayoral election was held on April 4, 2017, to elect the mayor of North Las Vegas, Nevada. It saw the re-election of John Jay Lee.

== Results ==
Results
Candidate	Votes	%
John Jay Lee	6,724	80.77
Gary Bouchard	849	10.20
DeQuincy "Quincy" Taylor	752	9.03
Total votes	8,325	

== See also ==
- List of mayors of North Las Vegas, Nevada
