= John Ellison (politician) =

American politician

Member of the Nevada Senate from the 19th district
- Incumbent
- Assumed office November 6, 2024
- Preceded by: Pete Goicoechea

Member of the Nevada Assembly from the 33rd district
- In office November 3, 2010 – November 9, 2022
- Preceded by: John Carpenter
- Succeeded by: Bert Gurr

Personal details
- Born: 1953 (age 72–73) Elko, Nevada, U.S.
- Party: Republican
- Spouse: Cindy Ellison
- Website: Campaign website

John Ellison (born 1953) is an American politician who is a member of the Nevada Senate from District 19. A Republican, he previously served in the Nevada Assembly from 2010 to 2022, representing District 33.

== Education ==
Ellison graduated from Elko High School.

== Elections ==
- 2012 Ellison was unopposed for both the June 12, 2012 Republican Primary and the November 6, 2012 General election, winning with 18,571 votes.
- 2010 When (Republican) Assemblyman John Carpenter retired from the Assembly because he was term limited and left the District 33 seat open, Ellison won the June 8, 2010 Republican Primary with 3,162 votes (66.04%), and won the three-way November 2, 2010 General election with 6,905 votes (51.25%) against Independent American candidate Janine Hansen and Democratic nominee Michael McFarlane.
