= Dina Neal =

American politician

Member of the Nevada Senate from the 4th district
- Incumbent
- Assumed office November 4, 2020
- Preceded by: Marcia Washington

Member of the Nevada Assembly from the 7th district
- In office November 3, 2010 – November 4, 2020
- Preceded by: Morse Arberry
- Succeeded by: Cameron Miller

Personal details
- Born: 1972 (age 53–54) Las Vegas, Nevada
- Party: Democratic
- Relatives: Joe Neal (father)
- Education: Southern University and A&M College; Southern University Law Center
- Website: dinaneal.com

Dina Neal (born 1972) is an American politician and a Democratic member of the Nevada Senate, serving since November 4, 2020. She represents District 4. Neal is a member of the National Black Caucus of State Legislators.

== Education ==
Neal earned her BA in political science from Southern University and A&M College and her JD from its Southern University Law Center.

== Elections ==
- 2010 When Democratic Assemblyman Morse Arberry was term limited and left the District 7 seat open, Neal won the three-way June 8, 2010 Democratic Primary with 1,233 votes (57.16%), and won the November 2, 2010 General election with 8,462 votes (77.45%) against Republican nominee Geraldine Lewis, who had run for the Assembly in 1996 and 2008.
- 2012 Neal won the June 12, 2012 Democratic Primary with 1,490 votes (78.50%), and won the November 6, 2012 General election with 14,496 votes (73.25%) against Republican nominee Brent Leavitt.
- On November 3, 2020, Neal was elected to the Nevada Senate seat representing the 4th district.

== Personal life ==
Neal is the daughter of Joe Neal, who served as a member of the Nevada Senate from 1973 to 2004. Neal was elected to her father's former seat in 2020. Neal is a professor at Nevada State University.
