= Michael A. Schneider =

American politician

Member of the Nevada Senate from the 11th district
- In office 2004–2012
- Preceded by: District renamed from Clark 8 (a two-member district)
- Succeeded by: Aaron Ford

Member of the Nevada Senate from the Clark 8 (two-member district) district
- In office 1996–2004 Serving with Mark James 1992-2002; Barbara Cegavske 2002-2004
- Preceded by: O.C. Lee
- Succeeded by: district renamed to 11th District

Member of the Nevada Assembly from the 42nd district
- In office 1992–1996
- Preceded by: John W. Bayley
- Succeeded by: John Mortenson

Personal details
- Born: April 11, 1950 (age 76) McCook, Nebraska, U.S.
- Party: Democratic
- Spouse: Candice
- Profession: real estate consultant

Michael A. Schneider (born April 11, 1950) is a politician and member of the Democratic Party who served as a member of the Nevada Senate, representing Clark County District 11 (map) from 1996 to 2012, when he retired because of term limits. Previously he was a member of the Nevada Assembly from 1992 through 1996.

== Libel suit ==
In 2005, Schneider was sued by his 2004 Republican opponent Danny Tarkanian, son of college basketball coach Jerry Tarkanian, for defamation. During the campaign, Schneider accused Tarkanian of setting up telemarketing companies that were later found to be running scams that victimized the senior citizens and that he turned "state's evidence" against the telemarketers to avoid being prosecuted. Tarkanian practiced civil law until 1995 and admitted he helped set up the companies, but had no involvement in the day-to-day operations of any of them was not aware that any of the companies were already engaged in illegal activity at the time that he helped to set up them. The case went to trial on July 27, 2009. Schneider stood by statements he made in a 2004 debate with Tarkanian and in campaign ads and fliers accusing him of criminal activity. Former assistant U.S. Attorney Leif Reid, son of Nevada U.S. Senator Harry Reid, testified that Tarkanian was not part of the investigation into the companies. On July 31, a Clark County District Court jury ruled in Tarkanian's favor and awarded him $50,000 in damages. On August 3, Schneider agreed to pay a $150,000 settlement in the case.
