= Michelee Crawford =

American politician (born 1983)

- Crawford in 2025

Member of the Nevada Senate from the 1st district
- Incumbent
- Assumed office November 6, 2024
- Preceded by: Patricia Spearman

Personal details
- Born: 1983 (age 42–43) Tucson, Arizona, US
- Party: Democratic
- Website: shellyfornevada.com

Michelee "Shelly" Quiroz Cruz-Crawford (born 1983) is an American politician who is currently serving as a Democratic member of the Nevada Senate, representing the 1st district. Her district represents the North Las Vegas neighborhoods of Aliante and Craig Ranch as well as Nellis Air Force Base.

Crawford graduated from University of Nevada, Las Vegas. She was the first Latino Regent in the Air National Guard. She was a Nevada System of Higher Education Regent.
