= Pete Goicoechea =

Nevada State Senator

Member of the Nevada State Board of Regents
- Incumbent
- Assumed office December 4, 2024
- Governor: Joe Lombardo
- Preceded by: Michelee Crawford

Member of the Nevada Senate from the 19th district
- In office November 7, 2012 – November 6, 2024
- Preceded by: Dean Rhoads
- Succeeded by: John Ellison

Minority Leader of the Nevada Assembly
- In office February 2, 2009 – November 7, 2012
- Preceded by: Heidi Gansert
- Succeeded by: Pat Hickey

Member of the Nevada Assembly from the 35th district
- In office November 6, 2002 – November 7, 2012
- Preceded by: Marcia de Braga
- Succeeded by: James Healey

Personal details
- Born: September 8, 1949 (age 76) Salt Lake City, Utah, U.S.
- Party: Republican
- Spouse: Glady Tognoni
- Children: 2
- Education: Utah State University (attended)

Peter J. "Pete" Goicoechea (born September 8, 1949) is an American politician who served as the Nevada State Senator from the 19th district from 2012 to 2024. He previously served in the Nevada Assembly, representing the 35th district from 2002 to 2012. A member of the Republican Party, he was House Minority Leader from 2009 to 2012.

== Early life and education ==
Goicoechea was born in Salt Lake City on September 8, 1949. Of Basque descent, his grandfather, also named Pete Goicoechea was a fisherman who lived and worked in a town located on the Bay of Biscay. In the early 20th century, his grandfather immigrated to the United States. Goicoechea studied at Utah State University.

== Career ==
He has owned a ranch since 1970 and also worked for many years for the Eureka County, Nevada road department. He served on the Eureka County Commission from 1987 to 2002 and then was elected to the Nevada State Assembly.

He has also served as a member of the Nevada State Land Use Planning Advisory Council, the Nevada Grazing Board, and he has been the Director of the Nevada Water Resource Association. He is affiliated with the Eureka Volunteer Fire Department, E Clampus Vitus, the Humboldt River Authority, and the Nevada Rural Health Center.

== Personal life ==
Goicoechea is a Catholic. He and his wife Glady are the parents of two children.

Nevada Assembly
Preceded by Heidi Gansert	Minority Leader of the Nevada Assembly; 2009–2012	Succeeded by Pat Hickey
