= John Lee (Nevada politician) =

American politician (born 1955)

Mayor of North Las Vegas
- In office July 1, 2013 – December 7, 2022
- Preceded by: Shari Buck
- Succeeded by: Pamela Goynes-Brown

Member of the Nevada Senate from the 1st district
- In office November 3, 2004 – November 7, 2012
- Preceded by: Jon Porter
- Succeeded by: Pat Spearman

Member of the Nevada Assembly from the 3rd district
- In office November 6, 1996 – November 6, 2002
- Preceded by: Maureen Brower
- Succeeded by: Peggy Pierce

Personal details
- Born: August 20, 1955 (age 70) South Ruislip, England, UK
- Party: Democratic (before 2021); Republican (2021–present)

John Jay Lee (born August 20, 1955) is an American entrepreneur and politician who served as mayor of North Las Vegas. He is a former member of the Nevada Senate, representing Clark County District 1 (2004–2012), and a former member of the Nevada Assembly, representing District 3 (1996–2000).

Due to changes to the state law aligning local elections with state elections, Lee's second term was extended by a year and he was able to run for re-election in 2022. However, he did not run for re-election and instead ran unsuccessfully for Governor of Nevada in 2022.

== Early life ==
Lee was born on the U.S. Air Force Base in South Ruislip, Middlesex, England where his father was enlisted. At the age of six, he moved to North Las Vegas, in Clark County, Nevada. He attended Lincoln Elementary School, Quannah McCall Elementary School, St. Christopher's, Marion E. Cahlan Elementary School, Bridger Junior High and Rancho High School. As a boy, he was active in the Boy Scouts of America and earned the rank of Eagle Scout.

Lee's first job was as a dishwasher at the Silver Nugget on Las Vegas Boulevard. In 1975, he started working in the plumbing trade, using the family station wagon as his plumbing truck.

In 1991, Lee started Vegas Plumbing, Inc., a non-union plumbing company which he owns and operates today.

== Political career ==
Lee began his political career by serving on myriad city and county boards, including:

- One Citizen's Advisory Commission, Las Vegas Valley Water District: Member (1994–1996)
- City of Las Vegas Parks and Recreation Board: Member (1995–1997)
- Clark County Comprehensive Planning and Steering Committee: Member (1995–1998)
- City of Las Vegas Parking and Traffic Commission: Vice Chairman (1995–2002)
- Regional Transportation Commission: Chairman, Citizen's Bus Shelter Advisory Committee (2007–2008)
- Clark County Shooting Range: Chairman (2002–present)
- Boy Scouts of America: Member of Executive Board (2003–present)

Lee was elected to the Nevada Assembly in 1996 and served in the Assembly until 2000. He was elected to the Nevada Senate in 2004, where he served as a member of the Legislative Operations and Elections, and the Energy, Infrastructure, and Transportation committees.

He was also chairman of the Senate Government Affairs Committee, where he worked with city and county officials throughout Nevada to make government more responsive to the needs of residents.

On August 1, 2011, Lee announced his candidacy for U.S. Congress for the 2012 election cycle. This campaign ended less than four months later when he instead announced that he would run for re-election, which he lost to Pat Spearman in the Democratic primary.

=== North Las Vegas Mayor ===
On April 2, 2013, Lee was elected Mayor of North Las Vegas defeating incumbent Mayor Shari Buck. Lee assumed office on July 1, 2013. At the time of his election, North Las Vegas was facing large monetary challenges including a deficit of more than $150 million.

Lee has made the expansion and enhancement of North Las Vegas Libraries and parks two of his biggest priorities. In addition, his administration redesigned business licensing procedures, attracting new businesses to the city. Lee also initiated a plan to use state tax credits as an incentive to increase development at the Apex Industrial Park, an effort he claims could eventually result in the creation of up to 116,000 jobs to the area.

Lee was re-elected in 2017.

On April 6, 2021, Lee announced he would switch political affiliation from the Democratic to the Republican Party, citing what he called the "socialist takeover of the Nevada Democratic Party".

== Personal life ==
Lee met his first girlfriend, Marilyn Ruesch, in high school on a blind date. They married and had their first two children to the family a year apart. Today, they are the parents of seven children and twenty-eight grandchildren. His daughter, Alana, was Miss Nevada 2011.

In 2007, Lee was diagnosed with stage IV cancer, which he overcame in 2009.

Lee is an active member of the Boy Scouts of America Executive Board. His commitment to the Boy Scouts began through his affiliation with the Church of Jesus Christ of Latter-day Saints (LDS Church).

In October 2014, child pornography was found on his personal iPad. In 2015, former police chief Joseph Chronister alleged that Lee received special treatment from law enforcement officials who intentionally did not do enough to investigate him. Lee denies being responsible and claims he was the first to notify authorities. In September 2015, the case was dropped by the FBI, citing a lack of evidence.

== See also ==
- List of mayors of North Las Vegas, Nevada
