= Scott Hammond (politician) =

American politician (born 1966)

Member of the Nevada Senate from the 18th district
- In office 2012 – October 26, 2023
- Preceded by: Mike McGinness
- Succeeded by: John Steinbeck

Member of the Nevada Assembly from the 13th district
- In office 2010–2012
- Preceded by: Chad Christensen
- Succeeded by: Paul Anderson

Personal details
- Born: 1966 (age 59–60) Syracuse, New York, U.S.
- Party: Republican
- Spouse: Tonya Hammond
- Education: University of Nevada, Las Vegas (BA, MA)
- Occupation: Teacher

Scott Hammond (born 1966 in Syracuse, New York) is an American politician. He was elected to the Nevada State Senate in 2012 to represent District 18, which encompasses the northwest part of the Las Vegas Valley including portions of the communities of Summerlin, Centennial Hills, Tule Springs and Lone Mountain. He defeated Kelli Ross, wife of Las Vegas City Councilman Steve Ross, by 1,471 votes.

In 2017, Hammond announced his candidacy for U.S. Congress in Nevada's 3rd congressional district.

Hammond resigned from the Nevada Senate in October 2023.

== Electoral history ==
2016 General Election for Nevada's 18th Senate District
Party	Candidate	Votes	%	±%
Republican	Scott T. Hammond	34,805	56.44%	
Democratic	Alexander Marks	26,864	43.56%	

2012 General Election for Nevada's 18th Senate District
Party	Candidate	Votes	%	±%
Republican	Scott T. Hammond	27,364	51.38%	
Democratic	Kelli Ross	25,893	48.62%	

2010 General Election for Nevada's 13th General Assembly District
Party	Candidate	Votes	%	±%
Republican	Scott T. Hammond	32,372	52.05%	
Democratic	Louis DeSalvio	27,279	43.86%	
Independent	Leonard Foster	2,545	4.09%	
