= Pat Spearman =

American politician

President pro tempore of the Nevada Senate
- In office February 6, 2023 – February 3, 2025
- Preceded by: Mo Denis
- Succeeded by: Marilyn Dondero Loop

Member of the Nevada Senate from the 1st district
- In office February 4, 2013 – February 3, 2025
- Preceded by: John Jay Lee
- Succeeded by: Michelee Cruz-Crawford

Personal details
- Born: 1955 (age 70–71) Indianapolis, Indiana, U.S.
- Party: Democratic
- Education: Norfolk State University (BA); Seminary of the Southwest (MDiv)

Military service
- Allegiance: United States
- Branch/service: United States Army
- Years of service: 1977–2007
- Rank: Lieutenant Colonel
- Unit: Military Police Corps

Patricia Ann Spearman (born 1955) is an American cleric, veteran, and Democratic politician from North Las Vegas, Nevada. She was elected in November 2012 to the Nevada Senate representing District 1, that is composed of the northern section of North Las Vegas and slivers of neighboring jurisdictions, after defeating incumbent John Jay Lee in the primary, and winning the general election. Spearman became the first openly lesbian member of the Nevada Legislature. She was re-elected in November 2016, and served as co-majority whip. Regarded as one of the most liberal members of the Nevada Senate, Spearman introduced bills which provided equal pay for women, supported LGBT rights, and supported veterans. Spearman is also a supporter of the Equal Rights Amendment. Moreover, she was involved in the process of establishing the Nevada Revenue Plan during the 2015 session. On October 6, 2021, Spearman entered the 2022 race for Mayor of North Las Vegas, Nevada, but was defeated by Pamela Goynes-Brown.

Before being elected senator, Spearman served in the United States Army for 29 years, reaching the rank of lieutenant colonel, was a pastor, and held several public service positions, including president of the school district of San Marcos, Texas.

== Early life and career ==
Born in 1955 in Indianapolis, Indiana, Spearman was the daughter of a traveling evangelist. Because of that, she moved a lot during her childhood. Spearman earned a Bachelor of Arts in political science from Norfolk State University in Norfolk, Virginia, and attended the Episcopal Theological Seminary of the Southwest in Austin, Texas, where she graduated with a Master of Divinity (M.Div.). Moreover, she attended the Defense Equal Opportunity Management Institute and the U.S. Army Command and General Staff College, while serving in the army. When Spearman was running for Senate in 2012, she was pursuing a Doctor of Business Administration at Walden University, an online college.

Spearman spent 29 years (1977–2007) in the Military Police Corps of the United States Army, rising to the rank of lieutenant colonel. While serving in the military in 2004, she received the title Kentucky colonel. Furthermore, she held different public service positions in San Marcos, Texas in the 1980s and 1990s, starting as chair of the advisory council of a local district of the Department of Health and Human Services for two years. Thereafter, she was simultaneously member of the board of directors of a local charitable organization, member of the 17th Congressional District Selection Committee for Military Academies, and president of the San Marcos Consolidated Independent School District. She reached the board of the school district in 1991 after receiving 1,136 votes, and was chosen board president six months later. She did not seek re-election to a second term in 1994. In the early 1990s, she also served as pastor of the Jackson Chapel, a United Methodist church in San Marcos.

Between 2001 and 2005, Spearman served as faculty at the University of Louisville, where she was a lecturer in Pan American studies and director of the multicultural center. After moving to the Las Vegas Valley in 2005, she founded the Resurrection Faith Community Ministries, a church in North Las Vegas, and became pastor of the church. Spearman also volunteered for Barack Obama's presidential campaign in 2008, and was member of the advisory boards for Harry Reid and Steven Horsford in 2010 and 2011 respectively.

== Nevada Senate ==
=== 2012 election ===
In 2012, Spearman challenged two-term incumbent Nevada Senator John Jay Lee, who was endorsed by the Senate Democratic Caucus, to represent the 1st district in the Nevada Senate. Spearman argued Lee was too moderate, since he opposed abortion and gay marriage. For that reason, she was supported by a coalition of liberal-leaning social and environmental groups. Spearman, who is lesbian herself, supported gay marriage and abortion. Furthermore, Spearman said Lee was not doing enough for his constituents. On her campaign website and in press releases, she stated she had worked as a professor at the University of Louisville, but the Las Vegas Review-Journal found out she technically had not been a professor. Lee criticized Spearman during his campaign for the falsehood, saying she was lying about her background in order to win the primary. Besides, Lee said that "[his] opponent [had] been encouraged to run by supporters of single issues like gay rights," and that the voters needed "the seniority and maturity of a senator."

Spearman won the primary, that was held on June 12, with 63% of the votes. She called it "a victory for the people." Spearman had spent about $12,000 on her primary campaign, which was only a fifteenth of the amount Lee had spent. However, an additional $80,000 was spent on her campaign by other political groups that were campaigning against Lee. An analysis by Lee's opponents, found out 54% of the voters were female, and a third of them had never voted in a primary before. During the general election, she was only challenged by Independent American Gregory Hughes, as no Republican had filed for the office. During the campaign for the general election, Spearman said it was important for Nevada to raise funding for education, since the current education system makes the state unattractive to new businesses and industries. She argued the wages of teachers had to be raised, and classes had to become smaller. In order to accomplish that, Spearman wanted to review the state's tax system. Spearman defeated her opponent on November 6 with 69% of the votes, having raised $108,000 for her general election campaign. Her term as a senator started the following day.

=== First term (2012-2016) ===
During the 2013 regular session, Spearman sponsored multiple bills that passed the Legislature, including one that lists gender identity as a motivating factor for hate crimes. Besides, she supported a constitutional amendment to legalize gay marriage, and introduced an amendment to it that would allow religious organizations and clergy to refuse to marry people in order to take away concerns, and to guarantee religious protections. In May, Spearman supported an assembly bill extending the deadline for voter registration, arguing she knew as a veteran that it would help military personnel. The bill, however, was vetoed by Governor Brian Sandoval after being approved by both houses.

In 2014, multiple Democrats asked Spearman to run for governor as no popular Democrats filed for the office, but she decided not to do so. Later that year, the members of the Legislature convened for a special session in order to approve proposed tax abatements for Tesla Motors, that would then build a battery factory in Nevada. Although Spearman criticized the proposal, because it would eliminate a program that helped small businesses, she voted for it.

During the 2015 regular session, Spearman among other things introduced on behalf of absent Senator Debbie Smith a bill that would have prohibited people convicted of domestic violence and stalking to own guns. However, the bill did not pass the Legislature. Besides, she advocated for legislation that provided equal pay for women and minorities. Spearman did so rallying together with other Democrats in front of the Nevada Legislative Building surrounded by supporters. She argued another bill sponsored by Republican Michael Roberson did not go far enough, but later decided to support it in a bipartisan effort. It came no further than passing the Senate. She also tried to provide equal rights for women by introducing a senate joint resolution that would ratify the Equal Rights Amendment, an amendment to the U.S. Constitution, of which the ratification deadline had expired in 1982. The resolution never came to a vote.

Furthermore, Spearman helped establish the tax plan for the biennial budget. After Governor Sandoval had revealed his tax plan, Spearman introduced an alternative on March 17. Her tax plan would repeal the payroll tax (also called modified business tax), keep the business license fee at $200 for most companies, and impose a 0.47% gross receipts tax for businesses with a quarterly gross revenue of over $25,000. Spearman wanted to repeal the payroll tax in order to not punish the hiring of people. She said the plan was not meant to undermine the governor's plan, but to trigger debate, and to provide a choice. The Republican leadership proposed its own tax plan subsequently. Spearman voted in favor of the final plan, that combined all three plans, and was signed into law on June 9. The so-called Nevada Revenue Plan included Spearman's gross receipts tax (under the name Commerce Tax), but the conditions and rates differed: the tax has to be paid by businesses with a gross revenue of over $4 million, and the tax rates differ between 0.051% and 0.331% depending on the business sector. The Tax Foundation criticized such taxes, because they carry a pyramid effect – meaning that products are being taxed on multiple levels – and also tax loss-making businesses. That organization disapproved of the rates as well, since they are based on a one-year study of the economy of Texas.

In December 2015, a special session was called to give tax breaks to Faraday Future, that would in turn build a factory near North Las Vegas. Spearman voted in favor of the tax breaks, and called it a "watershed moment" for her constituents, as the area was hard hit by the recession. During the last year of her term, 2016, she organized a ceremony as a reaction to the Orlando nightclub shooting at the Gay and Lesbian Community Center of Southern Nevada. Later that year, Spearman was named member of the newly created New Energy Industry Task Force. The task force was created by Governor Sandoval in order to advise his administration on ways to promote renewable energy.

=== 2016 election and second term ===
Spearman sought re-election in 2016, when her first term ended. She was challenged by Republican Arsen Ter-Petrosyan, who had never run for office before. During the campaign season, Spearman supported presidential candidate Hillary Clinton, and held a speech at the Democratic National Convention on July 25, talking about LGBT rights, and saying how the Republican presidential ticket would threaten those rights. During her own campaign, Spearman said schools had to adapt to the available career opportunities. Moreover, she supported Ballot Question 2, a voter initiative to legalize cannabis. During a council meeting of the League of Women Voters of Las Vegas, she said she would introduce bills concerning equal pay, the ratification of the Equal Rights Amendment, and voter registration. She won the election, that was held on November 8, with 65% of the votes. She had raised over $235,000.

After her re-election, she became part of the leadership as co-majority whip together with Joyce Woodhouse.

=== 2020 election and final term ===
Spearman was elected in 2020 to a third and final term in the Senate and was termed out in the 2024 Nevada Senate election. Michelee “Shelly” Cruz-Crawford, a Democrat and first-term Nevada System of Higher Education Regent, was elected to succeed Spearman in SD 1.

=== Committee membership ===
- 2013 session:
  - Senate Committee on Legislative Operations and Elections - chair
  - Senate Committee on Government Affairs - vice chair
  - Senate Committee on Transportation
- 2015 session:
  - Senate Committee on Commerce, Labor and Energy
  - Senate Committee on Revenue and Economic Development
  - Senate Committee on Health and Human Services (substituting for Debbie Smith when she was treated for a brain tumor)
- 2017 session:
  - Senate Committee on Health and Human Services - chair
  - Senate Committee on Commerce, Labor and Energy - vice chair
  - Senate Committee on Education
- 2019 session:
  - Senate Committee on Commerce and Labor - chair
  - Senate Committee on Health and Human Services - vice chair
  - Senate Committee on Growth and Infrastructure

== Personal life ==
Spearman is African-American, and she was the first openly lesbian member of the Nevada Legislature. State senator David Parks was previously the only openly LGBT senator in Nevada. Two decades earlier – in 1992 – Spearman married Donald Brewington, who was a pastor as well, in San Antonio. She adopted a teenage son, Na’Onche Osborne, who had previously experienced a troubled childhood resulting in Post-traumatic stress disorder. Osborne was shot to death at a North Las Vegas casino on April 1, 2025. The alleged shooter, Aerion Warmsley, was pled not guilty to state and federal charges of murder, carjacking, and brandishing a weapon.

== Electoral history ==
=== 2022 ===
2022 North Las Vegas mayoral election Results
Candidate	Votes	%
Pamela Goynes-Brown	9,762	36.91
Pat Spearman	4,526	17.11
Robert Taylor	3,707	14.02
Nathan Atkins	3,374	12.76
Jesse Addison III	1,851	7.00
Gary Bouchard	1,743	6.59
Laura Perkins	1,485	5.61
Total votes	26,448	100.00

North Las Vegas, Nevada mayoral election, November 8, 2022 runoff
Party	Candidate	Votes	%
Nonpartisan	Pamela Goynes-Brown	40,105	65.7
Nonpartisan	Pat Spearman	20,928	34.3

=== 2020 ===
Nevada State Senate, District 1 General Election, 2020
Party	Candidate	Votes	%
Democratic	Pat Spearman	51,648	100.0

=== 2016 ===
Nevada State Senate, District 1 General Election, 2016
Party	Candidate	Votes	%
Democratic	Pat Spearman	33,688	65.4
Republican	Arsen Ter-Petrosyan	17,800	34.6

=== 2012 ===
Nevada State Senate, District 1 Primary Election, 2012
Party	Candidate	Votes	%
Democratic	Pat Spearman	2,244	63.0
Democratic	John Jay Lee	1,318	37.0

Nevada State Senate, District 1 General Election, 2012
Party	Candidate	Votes	%
Democratic	Pat Spearman	29,026	68.7
Independent American	Gregory Hughes	13,221	31.3

Nevada Senate
Preceded by Mo Denis	President pro tempore of the Nevada Senate; 2023–2025	Succeeded by Marilyn Dondero Loop
