= List of speakers of the Nevada Assembly =

Speaker of Nevada Assembly

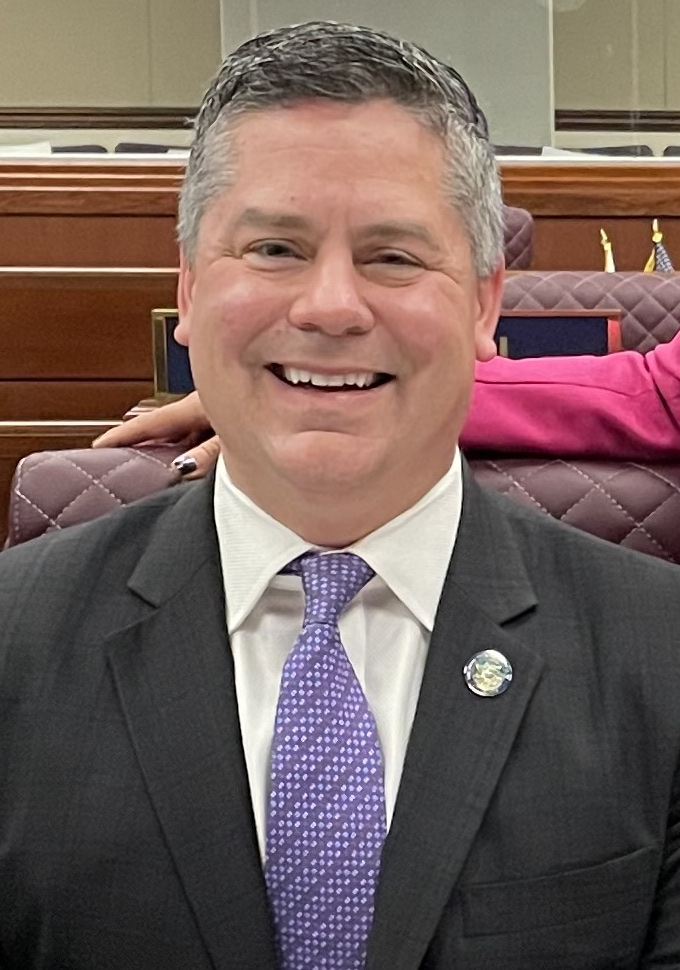
- Incumbent; Steve Yeager since April 28, 2022
- Seat: Nevada State Capitol
- Appointer: Nevada Assembly
- Inaugural holder: Charles W. Tozer
- Formation: 1864

The following is a list of speakers of the Nevada Assembly since statehood.

== Speakers of the Nevada Assembly ==
Speaker	Term	Party	County/Residence	Notes
Charles W. Tozer	1864–1867	Union	Storey	
James A. Banks	1866–1867	Union	Humboldt	
Robert D. Ferguson	1867–1869	Union	Storey	
David O. Adkison	1869–1871	Union	Storey	
Robert E. Lowery	1871–1873	Democratic	Storey	
John Bowman	1873–1875	Republican	Nye	
W. C. Dovey	1875–1877	Republican	Lyon	
Henry Rust Mighels	1877–1879	Republican	Ormsby	
Henry A. Gaston	1879–1881	Republican	Storey	
George W. Merrill	1881–1883	Democratic	Eureka	
Charles S. Varian	1883–1885	Republican	Roop, Washoe	
Edward T. George	1885–1887	Republican	Lander	
Archibald J. McDonell	1887–1889	Republican	Storey	
Trenmor Coffin	1889–1891	Republican	Ormsby	
Charles F. Bicknell	1891–1893	Republican	Ormsby	
Thomas J. Bell	1893–1895	Democratic	Nye	
Lemuel Allen	1895–1901	Democratic	Churchill	
Clarence D. Van Duzer	1901–1903	Democratic	Humboldt	
Marion S. Wilson	1903–1905	Democratic	Elko	
Samuel Platt	1905–1907	Republican	Ormsby	
Robert E. Skaggs	1907–1909	Democratic	Elko	
J. B. Giffen	1909–1911	Democratic	Nye	
August C. Frohlich	1911–1913	Republican	Washoe	
Thomas A. Brandon	1913–1915	Democratic	Humboldt	
Allen G. McBride	1915–1917	Republican	Elko	
Ben D. Luce	1917–1919	Democratic	Nye	
D. J. Fitzgerald	1919–1921	Democratic	Nye	
Charles S. Chandler	1921–1923	Republican	White Pine	
James M. Lockhart	1923–1925	Republican	White Pine	
Albert S. Henderson	1925–1926	Republican	Clark	
George G. Hussman	1926–1927	Republican	Douglas	
Doug Tandy	1927–1929	Republican	Lander	
Robert C. Turrittin	1929–1931	Republican	Washoe	
Doug Tandy	1931–1933	Republican	Lander	
Fred S. Alward	1933–1935	Democratic	Clark	
William Kennett	1935–1939	Democratic	Nye	
Berkeley L. Bunker	1939–1941	Democratic	Clark	
William J. Cashill	1941–1943	Democratic	Washoe	
Denver Dickerson	1943–1945	Democratic	Ormsby	
Peter A. Burke	1945–1947	Democratic	Washoe	
Harry E. Hazard	1947–1949	Democratic	Clark	
Peter A. Burke	1949–1951	Democratic	Washoe	
John M. Higgins	1951–1953	Democratic	Clark	
M. E. McCuistion	1953–1955	Democratic	Elko	
Cyril O. Bastian	1955–1957	Democratic	Lincoln	
William D. Swackhamer	1957–1959	Democratic	Lander	
Chester S. Christensen	1959–1960	Democratic	Washoe	
Bruce M. Parks	1960–1961	Democratic	Mineral	
Chester S. Christensen	1961–1963	Democratic	Washoe	
L. E. Tyson	1963–1964	Democratic	Clark	
Norman D. Glaser	1964–1965	Democratic	Elko	
William D. Swackhamer	1965–1967	Democratic	Lander	
Melvin D. Close Jr.	1967–1969	Democratic	Clark	
Howard F. McKissick Jr.	1969–1971	Republican	Reno	
Lawrence Jacobsen	1971–1973	Republican	Minden	
Keith Ashworth	1973–1977	Democratic	Las Vegas	
Joe Dini	1977–1979	Democratic	Yerington	
Paul W. May Jr.	1979–1981	Democratic	North Las Vegas	
Robert R. Barengo	1981–1983	Democratic	Reno	
Jack Vergiels	1983–1985	Democratic	Las Vegas	
Byron Bilyeu	1985–1987	Republican	Elko	
Joe Dini	1987–1995	Democratic	Yerington	
Lynn Hettrick	1995–1997	Republican	Gardnerville	Co-speaker
Joe Dini	1995–1997	Democratic	Yerington	Co-speaker
Joe Dini	1997–2001	Democratic	Yerington	
Richard D. Perkins	2001–2007	Democratic	Henderson	
Barbara Buckley	2007–2011	Democratic	Las Vegas	
John Oceguera	2011–2013	Democratic	North Las Vegas	
Marilyn Kirkpatrick	2013–2014	Democratic	North Las Vegas	
John Hambrick	2015–2017	Republican	Las Vegas	
Jason Frierson	2017–2022	Democratic	Las Vegas	
Steve Yeager	2022–	Democratic	Las Vegas	

== Speakers of the Territorial House of Representatives ==
Speaker	Term	Party	County/Residence	Notes
Miles N. Mitchell	1861	Union	Virginia City	
John H. Mills	1862	Union	Storey	
A. J. Simmons	1864	Union	Humboldt	

== See also ==
- List of Nevada state legislatures
