= 2020 Nevada Assembly election =

- November 3, 2020

All 42 seats in the Nevada Assembly 22 seats needed for a majority
- Turnout: 68.24%
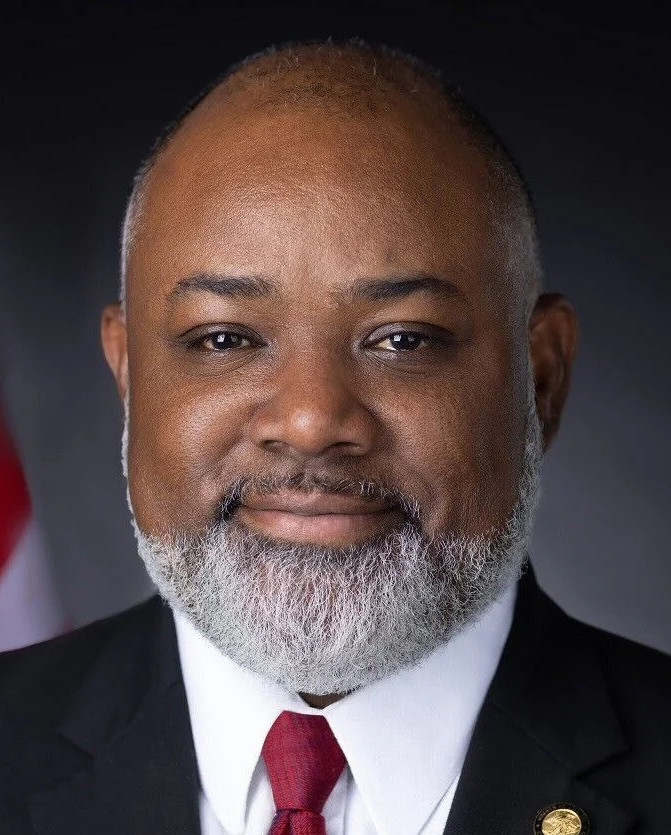

| | Majority party | Minority party |
|---|---|---|
| Leader | Jason Frierson | Robin L. Titus |
| Party | Democratic | Republican |
| Leader's seat | 8th district | 38th district |
| Seats before | 29 | 13 |
| Seats won | 26 | 16 |
| Seat change | ▼3 | ▲3 |
| Popular vote | 581,197 | 640,275 |
| Percentage | 46.74% | 51.50% |
| Swing | ▼5.43% | ▲4.47% |
- Results: Republican gain Democratic hold Republican hold
Speaker before election
Jason Frierson
Democratic
Speaker
Jason Frierson
Democratic

The 2020 Nevada Assembly election was held on November 3, 2020. Elections were also held in the state for U.S. president, U.S. House of Representatives, and for the Nevada Senate.

Primary elections were held on August 8.

== Predictions ==
| Source | Ranking | As of |
|---|---|---|
| The Cook Political Report | Likely D | October 21, 2020 |

== Results ==
=== Overview ===
Summary of the November 3, 2020 Nevada Assembly election results
| Party | Candidates | Votes | % | Seats | +/– |
|---|---|---|---|---|---|
| Republican | 34 | 640,275 | 51.50 | 16 | ▲3 |
| Democratic | 35 | 581,197 | 46.74 | 26 | ▼3 |
| Libertarian | 4 | 13,002 | 1.05 | 0 | Steady |
| Independent American | 4 | 4,757 | 0.38 | 0 | Steady |
| Others | 3 | 4,134 | 0.33 | 0 | Steady |
| Valid votes | | 1,243,365 | 88.32 | - | - |
| Blank or invalid | | 164,396 | 11.68 | - | - |
| Total | | 1,407,761 | 100 | 42 | Steady |
| Abstentions | | 414,405 | 23.74 | - | - |
| Registered voters / turnout | | 1,822,166 | 77.26 | - | - |
Source: ,

=== Close races ===
Seats where the margin of victory was under 10%:

1. State Assembly district 37, 1.78% (gain)
2. State Assembly district 29, 2.46%
3. State Assembly district 31, 3.54% (gain)
4. State Assembly district 21, 3.94%
5. State Assembly district 35, 4.82%
6. State Assembly district 4, 5.14% (gain)
7. State Assembly district 41, 5.32%
8. State Assembly district 5, 8.44%

=== District 1 ===
2020 Nevada Assembly District 1 election
| Party | Candidate | Votes | % |
|---|---|---|---|
| Democratic | Daniele Monroe-Moreno (incumbent) | 25,443 | 100.00% |
| Total votes | | 25,443 | 100.00% |

=== District 2 ===
2020 Nevada Assembly District 2 election
| Party | Candidate | Votes | % |
|---|---|---|---|
| Republican | Heidi Kasama | 20,025 | 54.27% |
| Democratic | Radhika Kunnel | 16,165 | 43.81% |
| Independent | Garrett Leduff | 706 | 1.91% |
| Total votes | | 36,896 | 100.00% |

=== District 3 ===
2020 Nevada Assembly District 3 election
| Party | Candidate | Votes | % |
|---|---|---|---|
| Democratic | Selena Torres (incumbent) | 16,123 | 100.00% |
| Total votes | | 16,123 | 100.00% |

=== District 4 ===
2020 Nevada Assembly District 4 election
| Party | Candidate | Votes | % |
|---|---|---|---|
| Republican | Richard McArthur | 21,854 | 52.57% |
| Democratic | Connie Munk (incumbent) | 19,714 | 47.43% |
| Total votes | | 41,568 | 100.00% |

=== District 5 ===
2020 Nevada Assembly District 5 election
| Party | Candidate | Votes | % |
|---|---|---|---|
| Democratic | Brittney Miller (incumbent) | 15,691 | 54.22% |
| Republican | Mack Miller | 13,249 | 45.78% |
| Total votes | | 28,940 | 100.00% |

=== District 6 ===
2020 Nevada Assembly District 6 election
| Party | Candidate | Votes | % |
|---|---|---|---|
| Democratic | Shondra Summers-Armstrong | 12,975 | 80.39% |
| Republican | Katie Duncan | 3,166 | 19.61% |
| Total votes | | 16,141 | 100.00% |

=== District 7 ===
2020 Nevada Assembly District 7 election
| Party | Candidate | Votes | % |
|---|---|---|---|
| Democratic | Cameron Miller | 17,218 | 68.70% |
| Republican | Anthony Palmer | 7,845 | 31.30% |
| Total votes | | 25,063 | 100.00% |

=== District 8 ===
2020 Nevada Assembly District 8 election
| Party | Candidate | Votes | % |
|---|---|---|---|
| Democratic | Jason Frierson (incumbent) | 17,761 | 58.34% |
| Republican | Edward Facey | 12,684 | 41.66% |
| Total votes | | 30,445 | 100.00% |

=== District 9 ===
2020 Nevada Assembly District 9 election
| Party | Candidate | Votes | % |
|---|---|---|---|
| Democratic | Steve Yeager (incumbent) | 23,474 | 55.16% |
| Republican | Barbara Altman | 19,084 | 44.84% |
| Total votes | | 42,558 | 100.00% |

=== District 10 ===
2020 Nevada Assembly District 10 election
| Party | Candidate | Votes | % |
|---|---|---|---|
| Democratic | Rochelle Nguyen (incumbent) | 12,366 | 61.81% |
| Republican | Chris Hisgen | 6,965 | 34.81% |
| Independent American | Jonathan Friedrich | 675 | 3.37% |
| Total votes | | 20,006 | 100.00% |

=== District 11 ===
2020 Nevada Assembly District 11 election
| Party | Candidate | Votes | % |
|---|---|---|---|
| Democratic | Bea Duran (incumbent) | 9,603 | 76.83% |
| Republican | Eric Krattiger | 2,896 | 23.17% |
| Total votes | | 12,499 | 100.00% |

=== District 12 ===
2020 Nevada Assembly District 12 election
| Party | Candidate | Votes | % |
|---|---|---|---|
| Democratic | Susie Martinez (incumbent) | 18,829 | 54.29% |
| Republican | Jeremy A. Graves | 14,783 | 42.62% |
| Independent | John Cardiff Gerhardt | 1,072 | 3.09% |
| Total votes | | 34,684 | 100.00% |

=== District 13 ===
2020 Nevada Assembly District 13 election
| Party | Candidate | Votes | % |
|---|---|---|---|
| Republican | Tom Roberts (incumbent) | 29,250 | 100.00% |
| Total votes | | 29,250 | 100.00% |

=== District 14 ===
2020 Nevada Assembly District 14 election
| Party | Candidate | Votes | % |
|---|---|---|---|
| Democratic | Maggie Carlton (incumbent) | 12,954 | 74.59% |
| Libertarian | Robert Wayerski | 4,414 | 25.41% |
| Total votes | | 17,368 | 100.00% |

=== District 15 ===
2020 Nevada Assembly District 15 election
| Party | Candidate | Votes | % |
|---|---|---|---|
| Democratic | Howard Watts III (incumbent) | 13,234 | 64.73% |
| Republican | Stan Vaughan | 7,210 | 35.27% |
| Total votes | | 20,444 | 100.00% |

=== District 16 ===
2020 Nevada Assembly District 16 election
| Party | Candidate | Votes | % |
|---|---|---|---|
| Democratic | Cecelia González | 11,472 | 65.35% |
| Republican | Reyna Sajdak | 6,083 | 34.65% |
| Total votes | | 17,555 | 100.00% |

=== District 17 ===
2020 Nevada Assembly District 17 election
| Party | Candidate | Votes | % |
|---|---|---|---|
| Democratic | Clara Thomas | 21,555 | 66.18% |
| Republican | Jack Polcyn | 11,013 | 33.82% |
| Total votes | | 32,568 | 100.00% |

=== District 18 ===
2020 Nevada Assembly District 18 election
| Party | Candidate | Votes | % |
|---|---|---|---|
| Democratic | Venicia Considine | 16,142 | 61.42% |
| Republican | Heather Ann Florian | 10,140 | 38.58% |
| Total votes | | 26,282 | 100.00% |

=== District 19 ===
2020 Nevada Assembly District 19 election
| Party | Candidate | Votes | % |
|---|---|---|---|
| Republican | Annie Black | 25,599 | 100.00% |
| Total votes | | 25,599 | 100.00% |

=== District 20 ===
2020 Nevada Assembly District 20 election
| Party | Candidate | Votes | % |
|---|---|---|---|
| Democratic | David Orentlicher | 18,631 | 100.00% |
| Total votes | | 18,631 | 100.00% |

=== District 21 ===
2020 Nevada Assembly District 21 election
| Party | Candidate | Votes | % |
|---|---|---|---|
| Democratic | Elaine Marzola (incumbent) | 15,807 | 51.97% |
| Republican | Cherlyn Arrington | 14,610 | 48.03% |
| Total votes | | 30,417 | 100.00% |

=== District 22 ===
2020 Nevada Assembly District 22 election
| Party | Candidate | Votes | % |
|---|---|---|---|
| Republican | Melissa Hardy (incumbent) | 31,632 | 100.00% |
| Total votes | | 31,632 | 100.00% |

=== District 23 ===
2020 Nevada Assembly District 23 election
| Party | Candidate | Votes | % |
|---|---|---|---|
| Republican | Glen Leavitt (incumbent) | 30,418 | 63.41% |
| Democratic | Brent Foutz | 16,189 | 33.75% |
| Independent American | Bill Hoge | 1,365 | 2.85% |
| Total votes | | 47,972 | 100.00% |

=== District 24 ===
2020 Nevada Assembly District 24 election
| Party | Candidate | Votes | % |
|---|---|---|---|
| Democratic | Sarah Peters (incumbent) | 20,191 | 100.00% |
| Total votes | | 20,191 | 100.00% |

=== District 25 ===
2020 Nevada Assembly District 25 election
| Party | Candidate | Votes | % |
|---|---|---|---|
| Republican | Jill Tolles (incumbent) | 32,513 | 100.00% |
| Total votes | | 32,513 | 100.00% |

=== District 26 ===
2020 Nevada Assembly District 26 election
| Party | Candidate | Votes | % |
|---|---|---|---|
| Republican | Lisa Krasner (incumbent) | 28,428 | 59.21% |
| Democratic | Vance Alm | 19,588 | 40.79% |
| Total votes | | 48,016 | 100.00% |

=== District 27 ===
2020 Nevada Assembly District 27 election
| Party | Candidate | Votes | % |
|---|---|---|---|
| Democratic | Teresa Benitez-Thompson (incumbent) | 18,559 | 58.47% |
| Republican | Barb Hawn | 13,184 | 41.53% |
| Total votes | | 31,743 | 100.00% |

=== District 28 ===
2020 Nevada Assembly District 28 election
| Party | Candidate | Votes | % |
|---|---|---|---|
| Democratic | Edgar Flores (incumbent) | 10,499 | 76.88% |
| Libertarian | Natasha Bousley | 3,158 | 23.12% |
| Total votes | | 13,657 | 100.00% |

=== District 29 ===
2020 Nevada Assembly District 29 election
| Party | Candidate | Votes | % |
|---|---|---|---|
| Democratic | Lesley Cohen (incumbent) | 18,489 | 51.23% |
| Republican | Steven E. Delisle | 17,604 | 48.77% |
| Total votes | | 36,093 | 100.00% |

=== District 30 ===
2020 Nevada Assembly District 30 election
| Party | Candidate | Votes | % |
|---|---|---|---|
| Democratic | Natha C. Anderson | 15,459 | 54.08% |
| Republican | Randy Hoff | 11,693 | 40.91% |
| Independent American | Charlene Young | 1,433 | 5.01% |
| Total votes | | 28,585 | 100.00% |

=== District 31 ===
2020 Nevada Assembly District 31 election
| Party | Candidate | Votes | % |
|---|---|---|---|
| Republican | Jill Ann Dickman | 19,850 | 51.77% |
| Democratic | Skip Daly (incumbent) | 18,494 | 48.23% |
| Total votes | | 38,344 | 100.00% |

=== District 32 ===
2020 Nevada Assembly District 32 election
| Party | Candidate | Votes | % |
|---|---|---|---|
| Republican | Alexis Hansen (incumbent) | 25,058 | 73.59% |
| Democratic | Paula Povilaitis | 8,992 | 26.41% |
| Total votes | | 34,050 | 100.00% |

=== District 33 ===
2020 Nevada Assembly District 33 election
| Party | Candidate | Votes | % |
|---|---|---|---|
| Republican | John Ellison (incumbent) | 25,507 | 100.00% |
| Total votes | | 25,507 | 100.00% |

=== District 34 ===
2020 Nevada Assembly District 34 election
| Party | Candidate | Votes | % |
|---|---|---|---|
| Democratic | Shannon Bilbray-Axelrod (incumbent) | 17,353 | 57.90% |
| Republican | Jay Thomas Carlson | 12,616 | 42.10% |
| Total votes | | 29,969 | 100.00% |

=== District 35 ===
2020 Nevada Assembly District 35 election
| Party | Candidate | Votes | % |
|---|---|---|---|
| Democratic | Michelle Gorelow (incumbent) | 24,148 | 52.41% |
| Republican | Jay Calhoun | 21,927 | 47.59% |
| Total votes | | 46,075 | 100.00% |

=== District 36 ===
2020 Nevada Assembly District 36 election
| Party | Candidate | Votes | % |
|---|---|---|---|
| Republican | Gregory Hafen II (incumbent) | 34,235 | 100.00% |
| Total votes | | 34,235 | 100.00% |

=== District 37 ===
2020 Nevada Assembly District 37 election
| Party | Candidate | Votes | % |
|---|---|---|---|
| Republican | Andy Matthews | 18,727 | 50.89% |
| Democratic | Shea Backus (incumbent) | 18,070 | 49.11% |
| Total votes | | 36,797 | 100.00% |

=== District 38 ===
2020 Nevada Assembly District 38 election
| Party | Candidate | Votes | % |
|---|---|---|---|
| Republican | Robin L. Titus (incumbent) | 29,280 | 100.00% |
| Total votes | | 29,280 | 100.00% |

=== District 39 ===
2020 Nevada Assembly District 39 election
| Party | Candidate | Votes | % |
|---|---|---|---|
| Republican | Jim Wheeler (incumbent) | 29,996 | 67.57% |
| Democratic | Deborah Chang | 13,108 | 29.53% |
| Libertarian | Dave Jones | 1,289 | 2.90% |
| Total votes | | 44,393 | 100.00% |

=== District 40 ===
2020 Nevada Assembly District 40 election
| Party | Candidate | Votes | % |
|---|---|---|---|
| Republican | Philip O'Neill | 21,877 | 59,67% |
| Democratic | Sena Loyd | 14,789 | 40.33% |
| Total votes | | 36,666 | 100.00% |

=== District 41 ===
2020 Nevada Assembly District 41 election
| Party | Candidate | Votes | % |
|---|---|---|---|
| Democratic | Sandra Jauregui (incumbent) | 19,118 | 50.95% |
| Republican | Erika Smith | 17,119 | 45.63% |
| Independent American | Victoria K. DaCosta | 1,284 | 3.42% |
| Total votes | | 37,521 | 100.00% |

=== District 42 ===
2020 Nevada Assembly District 42 election
| Party | Candidate | Votes | % |
|---|---|---|---|
| Democratic | Alexander Assefa (incumbent) | 12,994 | 66.67% |
| Libertarian | Liz Delsignore | 4,141 | 21.25% |
| Independent | Sayed Zaidi | 2,356 | 12.09% |
| Total votes | | 19,491 | 100.00% |

== See also ==
- 2020 Nevada elections
- List of Nevada state legislatures
