= 2020 Nevada Senate election =

- November 3, 2020

10 of 21 seats in the Nevada Senate 11 seats needed for a majority
	Majority party	Minority party
Leader	Nicole Cannizzaro	James Settelmeyer
Party	Democratic	Republican
Leader since	March 5, 2018	November 7, 2018
Leader's seat	6th	17th
Seats before	13	8
Seats after	12	9
Seat change	▼1	▲1
Popular vote	321,290	234,367
Percentage	56.16%	40.97%
Swing	▲4.86%	▼4.76%
- Results: Republican gain Democratic hold Republican hold No election
Majority Leader before election
Nicole Cannizzaro
Democratic
Elected Majority Leader
Nicole Cannizzaro
Democratic

The 2020 Nevada Senate election was held on Tuesday, November 3, 2020. Voters in 10 districts of the Nevada Senate elected senators. The elections coincided with the elections for other offices, including for U.S. President, U.S. House and the Nevada Assembly. Republicans needed to gain three seats to win control of the chamber.

The primary elections were held on June 9, 2020.

== Background ==
In the 2018 Nevada State Senate election, Democrats maintained control of the Nevada Senate by a 13–8 margin. Democrats had controlled the chamber since 2016.

== Predictions ==
Source	Ranking	As of
The Cook Political Report	Likely D	October 21, 2020

== Results ==
=== Overview ===
Summary of the November 3, 2020 Nevada Senate election results
Party	Candidates	Votes	%	Seats				
Party	Candidates	Votes	%	Before	Up	Won	After	+/–
Democratic	9	321,290	56.16	13	7	6	12	▼1
Republican	7	234,367	40.97	8	3	4	9	▲1
Independent American	1	14,387	2.51	0	0	0	0	Steady
Libertarian	1	2,007	0.35	0	0	0	0	Steady
Total		572,051	100.00	21	10	10	21	Steady

=== Close races ===
Seats where the margin of victory was under 10%:

1. State Senate district 5, 0.49% (gain)
2. State Senate district 6, 0.94%
3. State Senate district 15, 3.58%

=== Results by district ===
==== District 1 ====
2020 Nevada State Senate election, District 1
Party	Candidate	Votes	%
Democratic	Patricia Spearman (incumbent)	51,648	100.00%
Total votes		51,648	100.00%
Democratic hold			

==== District 3 ====
2020 Nevada State Senate election, District 3
Party	Candidate	Votes	%
Democratic	Chris Brooks (incumbent)	30,944	100.00%
Total votes		30,944	100.00%
Democratic hold			

==== District 4 ====
2020 Nevada Senate election, District 4
Party	Candidate	Votes	%
Democratic	Dina Neal	31,417	75.27%
Republican	Esper M. Hickman	10,322	24.73%
Total votes		41,739	100.00%
Democratic hold			

==== District 5 ====
2020 Nevada Senate election, District 5
Party	Candidate	Votes	%
Republican	Carrie A. Buck	32,740	48.75%
Democratic	Kristee Watson	32,411	48.26%
Libertarian	Tim Hagan	2,007	2.99%
Total votes		67,158	100.00%
Republican gain from Democratic			

==== District 6 ====
2020 Nevada Senate election, District 6
Party	Candidate	Votes	%
Democratic	Nicole Cannizzaro (incumbent)	33,895	50.47%
Republican	April Becker	33,264	49.53%
Total votes		67,159	100.00%
Democratic hold			

==== District 7 ====
2020 Nevada Senate election, District 7
Party	Candidate	Votes	%
Democratic	Roberta Lange	39,036	100.00%
Total votes		39,036	100.00%
Democratic hold			

==== District 11 ====
2020 Nevada Senate election, District 11
Party	Candidate	Votes	%
Democratic	Dallas Harris (incumbent)	30,485	58.55%
Republican	Joshua Dowden	21,578	41.45%
Total votes		52,063	100.00%
Democratic hold			

==== District 15 ====
2020 Nevada State Senate election, District 15
Party	Candidate	Votes	%
Republican	Heidi Gansert (incumbent)	39,325	51.79%
Democratic	Wendy Jauregui-Jackins	36,605	48.21%
Total votes		75,930	100.00%
Republican hold			

==== District 18 ====
2020 Nevada Senate election, District 18
Party	Candidate	Votes	%
Republican	Scott Hammond (incumbent)	44,547	56.11%
Democratic	Liz Becker	34,849	43.89%
Total votes		79,396	100.00%
Republican hold			

==== District 19 ====
2020 Nevada Senate election, District 19
Party	Candidate	Votes	%
Republican	Pete Goicoechea (incumbent)	52,591	78.52%
Independent American	Tiffany Seeback	14,387	21.48%
Total votes		66,978	100.00%
Republican hold			

== See also ==
- 2020 Nevada elections
- List of Nevada state legislatures
