= Garn Mabey =

American politician (born 1958)

Minority Leader of the Nevada Assembly
- In office January 3, 2007 – October 2, 2007
- Preceded by: Lynn Hettrick
- Succeeded by: Heidi Gansert

Member of the Nevada Assembly from the 2nd district
- In office January 3, 2003 – January 3, 2009
- Preceded by: Merle Berman
- Succeeded by: John Hambrick

Personal details
- Born: February 8, 1958 (age 68) Salt Lake City, Utah, U.S.
- Party: Republican
- Education: Ricks College (AD); Brigham Young University (BS); Jefferson Medical College (Doctor of Medicine)

Garn Mabey (born February 8, 1958) is an American politician from the state of Nevada. A member of the Republican Party, he represented the 2nd district in the Nevada Assembly from 2003 to 2009, serving as Minority Leader from January to October 2007.

== Professional career ==
Mabey works as an obstetrician and gynecologist. He has served as president of the Clark County OB/GYN Society.

== Political career ==
Mabey first ran for Nevada Assembly in 2002, challenging incumbent Merle Berman in the Republican primary. Mabey's primary challenge was endorsed by U.S. Senator John Ensign. He ultimately prevailed with 53% of the vote, crediting his win to an extensive canvassing operation. Mabey went on to win the general election with 77% of the vote to 23% for Independent American nominee Brian Barnes. Mabey pledged to prioritize medical issues in the legislature, calling to reduce liability insurance premiums. He was re-elected in 2004 and 2006.

In November 2004, Mabey's Republican colleagues elected him Assistant Minority Leader. He beat out fellow assemblyman Rod Sherer for the position. Mabey was later elected Minority Leader in 2006, with Heidi Gansert as Assistant Minority Leader. He replaced Lynn Hettrick, who did not seek re-election in 2006.

In October 2007, Assembly Republicans voted to remove Mabey from his position and replace him with Gansert. Assemblyman James Settelmeyer said that Mabey "had indicated to everyone, including the press, he was done with the Assembly or did not want to take such an active role," while Assemblyman Bob Beers commented that "to a certain extent, it was his decision." Indeed, Mabey chose to retire in 2008, and was replaced by former Clark County Republican Party chair John Hambrick.

Mabey ran for U.S. Senate in the 2010 election. He received just 0.26% of the vote in the Republican primary. In 2016, Mabey applied to be appointed to the vacant 5th district Assembly seat. The appointment instead went to businessman Kyle James Stephens. Mabey later filed to run in the 2024 U.S. Senate election. His campaign was endorsed by the Las Vegas Sun and Las Vegas Weekly. He ultimately received 1.0% of the vote in the Republican primary.

== Personal life ==
Mabey lives in Las Vegas. He is married and has five children. His hobbies include photography and HAM radio.
