= Carrie Buck (politician) =

American educator and politician

Member of the Nevada Senate from the 5th district
- Incumbent
- Assumed office November 4, 2020
- Preceded by: Joyce Woodhouse

Personal details
- Born: July 19, 1971 (age 55) Sioux City, Iowa, U.S.
- Party: Republican
- Education: Montana State University (BS); University of Phoenix (MA); Nova Southeastern University (PhD)
- Website: State Senate website Campaign website

Carrie Ann Buck (born July 19, 1971) is an American educator and politician currently serving as a Republican member of the Nevada Senate. She represents the 5th district, which covers parts of Henderson and Paradise to the south of Las Vegas in Clark County. In early 2025, Buck announced her campaign for the U.S. House of Representatives to challenge incumbent Dina Titus in Nevada's 1st congressional district.

== Early life ==
Buck was born in 1971 in Sioux City, Iowa. She received a bachelor's of science degree in elementary education from Montana State University in 1995. She received a master's degree in administration and supervision from the University of Phoenix in 1998 and a doctorate degree in organizational leadership from NOVA Southeastern University in 2006. She is married to Eric S. Buck and the couple have four children: Collen, Colbie, Branson and Barrett.

She began teaching English as a second language students at an elementary school in Las Vegas, Nevada, in 1996. She became the principal of C.T. Sewell Elementary School in Henderson, Nevada, during the 2005/2006 school year, when the school was ranked as one of the lowest-performing elementary schools in Nevada. She increased test scores in both math and English and won a Milken Educator Award when the school became a National Title I School. In 2014, she became principal of the Pinecrest Academy, a charter school in Henderson. She became president of the Pinecrest Foundation, a non-profit focusing on providing funding for charter school initiatives.

== Political career ==
Buck first became involved in politics in 2016, when she ran against incumbent Joyce Woodhouse in the 2016 Nevada State Senate elections as the Republican candidate for the 5th district. She lost by fewer than 500 votes and was considered as a potential candidate to replace Woodhouse in 2017 in a potential recall, but the effort failed to gain traction.

By narrowly defeating Democratic opponent Kristee Watson, Buck became the only candidate to flip a State Senate seat from Democratic to Republican in the 2020 Nevada State Senate elections. As a state senator, Buck has proposed a bill that would have offered up to $10 million in tax credits for charter school donors to better fund facilities at Title I public charter schools.

=== 2026 Congressional Campaign ===
Buck announced her congressional campaign in early 2025, seeking to represent Nevada's 1st congressional district. She is challenging incumbent Dina Titus. According to Federal Election Commission filings reported by local media, Buck raised a little under $500,000 during the early months of her campaign.
