= Nevada's 5th Senate district =

American legislative district

Coordinates: 36.04°N 115.07°W

Nevada's 5th State Senate district
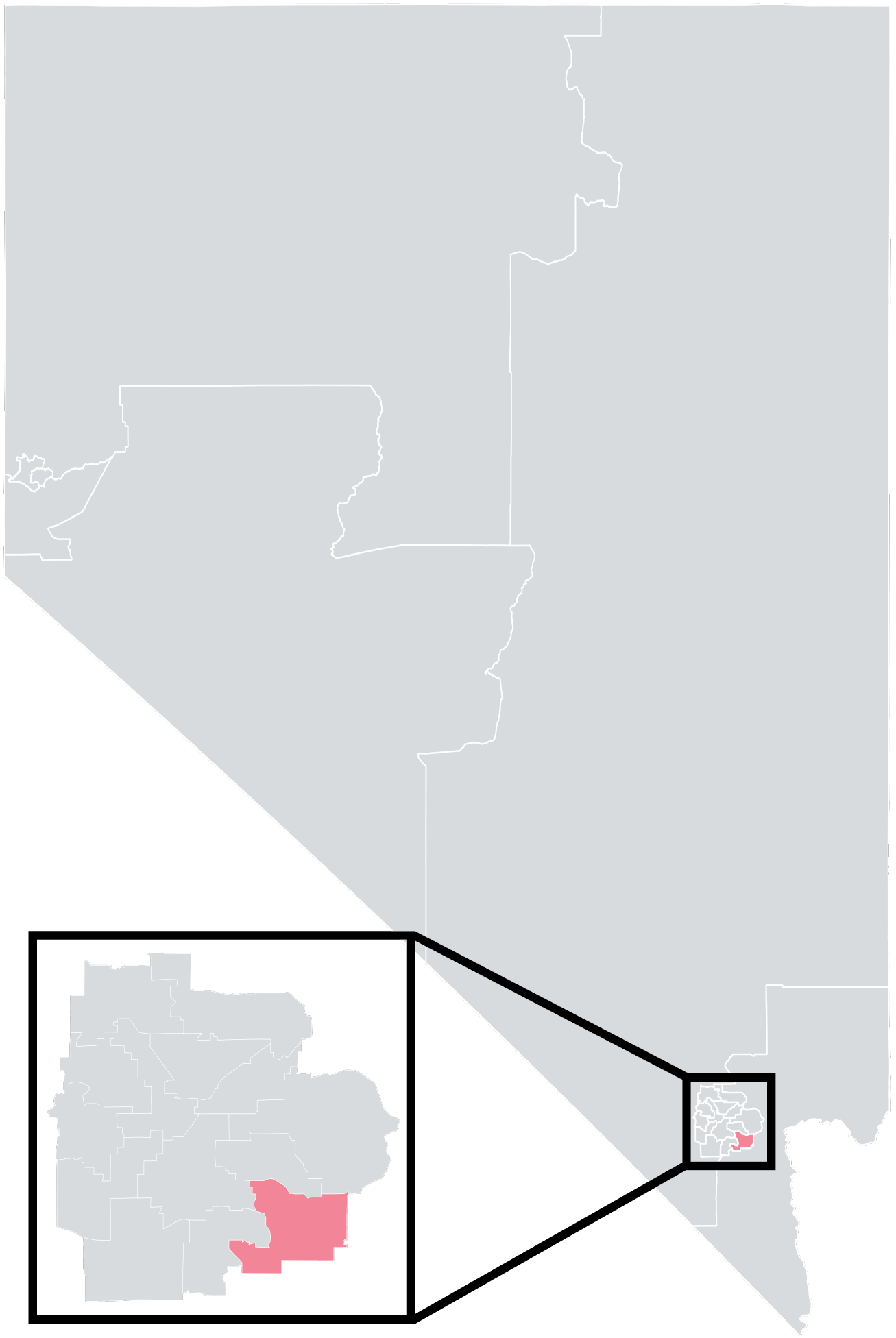
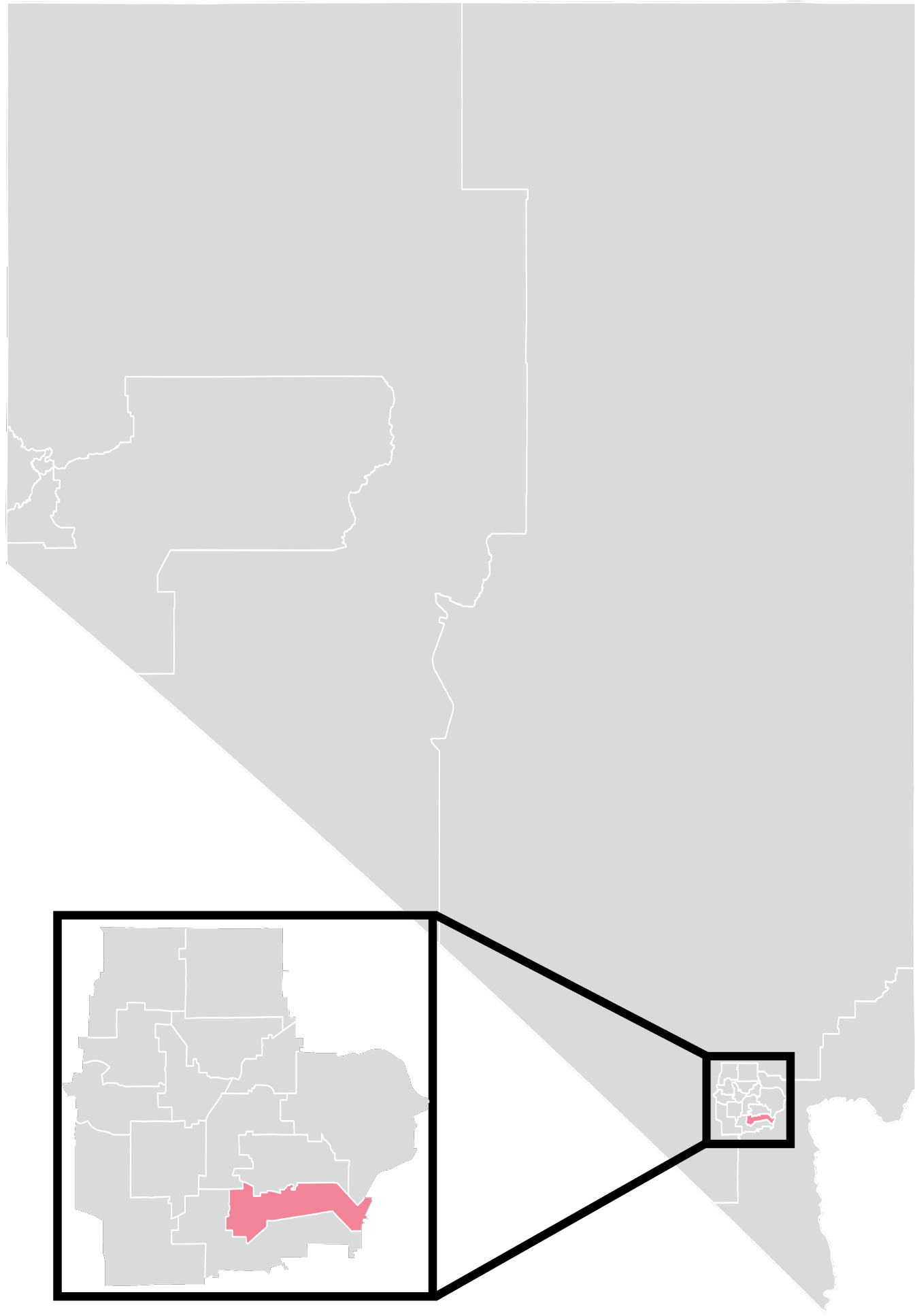
Senator
Carrie Buck; R–Henderson
- Registration: 41.6% Democratic; 35.6% Republican; 17.2% No party preference
- Demographics: 60% White; 6% Black; 20% Hispanic; 9% Asian; 5% Other
- Population (2018): 135,233
- Registered voters: 73,612

Nevada's 5th Senate district is one of 21 districts in the Nevada Senate. It has been represented by Republican Carrie Buck since 2020, succeeding Democrat Joyce Woodhouse.

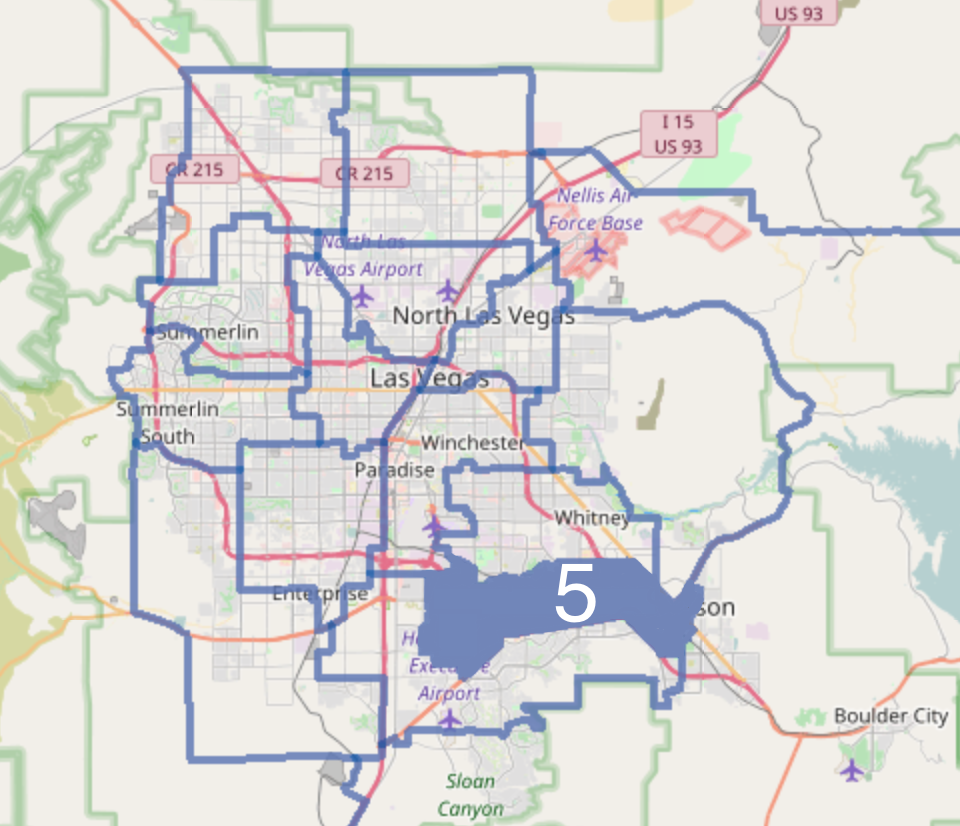
Closeup on the Las Vegas Valley with District 5 colored blue

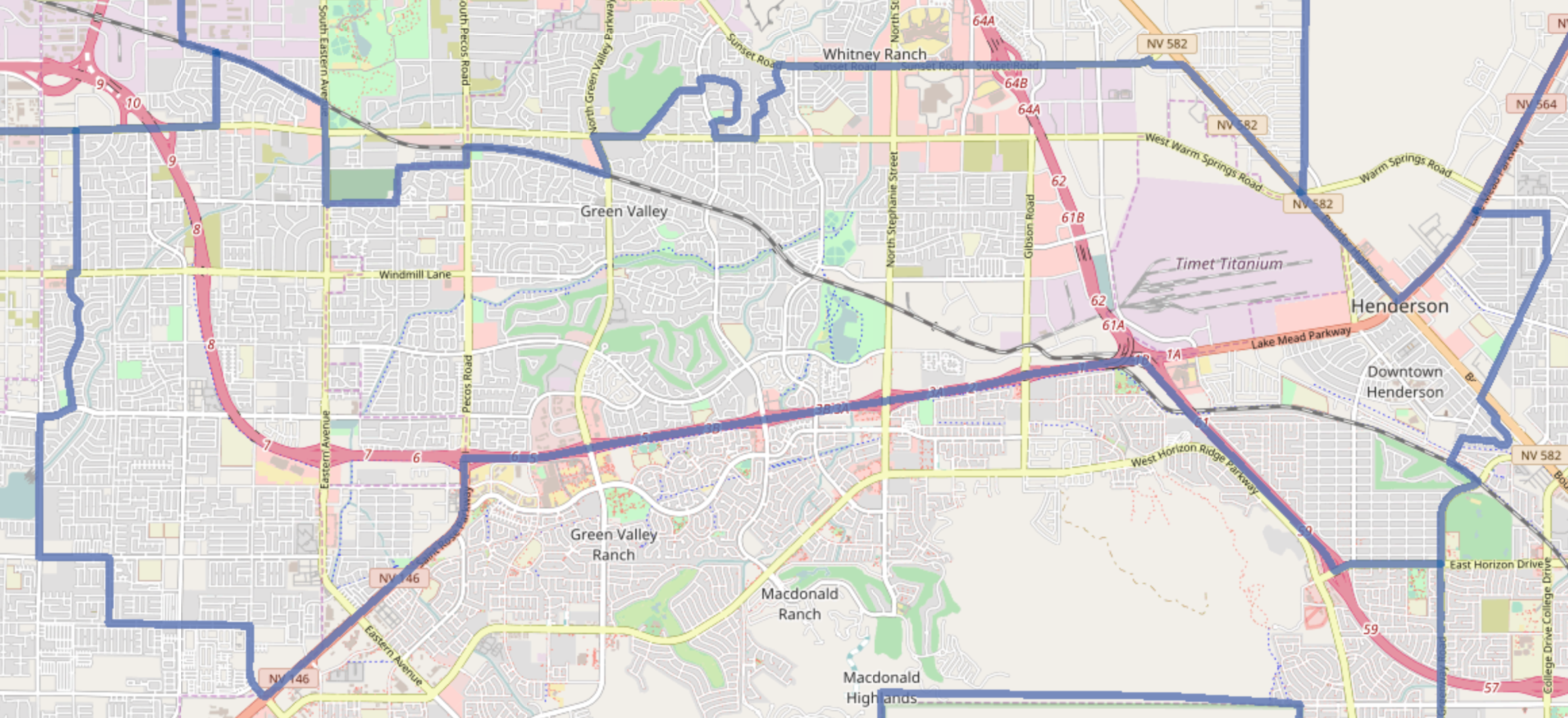
Closeup map of District 5

== Geography and demographics ==
District 5 covers parts of Henderson and Paradise to the south of Las Vegas in Clark County.

The district is located entirely within Nevada's 3rd congressional district, and overlaps with the 21st and 29th districts of the Nevada Assembly. The district has a surface area of 26.2 square miles (68 km^{2}), and a perimeter of 34.3 miles (55.2 km).

According to the 2010 census, the district had a population of 128,800 – 0.16% above the ideal. The district has a relatively high proportion of white and Asian American residents compared to the Nevada average. The district's population is better-educated than the Nevada average: more than 35% of the district's inhabitants have an associate's, bachelor's, or graduate degree. The median household income, a little over $62,000, is nearly $10,000 above the Nevada median, and the poverty rate is 8.5%, close to twice as low as in the rest of Nevada.

== Recent election results ==
Nevada Senators are elected to staggered four-year terms; since 2012 redistricting, the 5th district has held elections in presidential years.

=== 2024 ===
2024 Nevada State Senate election, District 5
Party	Candidate	Votes	%
Republican	Carrie Buck (incumbent)	42,275	53.46
Democratic	Jennifer Atlas	36,802	46.54
Republican hold			
Total votes		79,077	100%

=== 2020 ===
2020 Nevada State Senate election, District 5
Party	Candidate	Votes	%
Republican	Carrie Buck	32,740	48.8
Democratic	Kristee Watson	32,411	48.3
Libertarian	Tim Hagan	2,007	3.0
Total votes		67,158	100
Republican gain from Democratic			

=== 2016 ===
In the 2016 Democratic primary, incumbent Joyce Woodhouse faced Nicholas Lash, a political newcomer who claimed senator and presidential candidate Bernie Sanders as his inspiration. Lash said he wouldn't accept any campaign donations, as he wanted "to prove Bernie's point about taking the money out of politics." He called Woodhouse an "establishment candidate," and said he would, if elected, press for the establishment of a single-payer health care system and education reforms. Woodhouse, meanwhile, said she was "really proud" of the progress the legislature had made on education funding, and promised to focus on education and child care regulations if elected to another term. Woodhouse defeated Lash with over 80% of the vote.

Woodhouse faced Republican Carrie Buck and Libertarian Tim Hagan in the general election. Woodhouse maintained her focus on education, while Buck, a charter school director, attacked Woodhouse's education record and called her part of the "status quo." Hagan, meanwhile, said he wanted to "give voters another choice," and said he would push for a tax reduction and for the expansion of school choice. Woodhouse out-raised Buck $500,000 to $140,000, and defeated her by less than one percentage point.

2016 Nevada State Senate election, District 5
Primary election
Party	Candidate	Votes	%
Democratic	Joyce Woodhouse (incumbent)	4,145	85.5
Democratic	Nicholas Lash	704	14.5
Total votes		4,849	100
General election
Democratic	Joyce Woodhouse (incumbent)	26,208	47.9
Republican	Carrie Buck	25,739	47.0
Libertarian	Tim Hagan	2,784	5.1
Total votes		54,731	100
Democratic hold			

=== 2012 ===
In 2012, Democratic former state senator Joyce Woodhouse faced Republican Steve Kirk, who had previously defeated Annette Teijeiro in the Republican primary. Kirk, a 12-year Henderson City Councilman, supported Governor Brian Sandoval's tax increase in order to preserve the education budget, while Teijeiro insisted on decreasing taxes. With the endorsement of the Senate Republican Caucus, Kirk won the primary with over 70% of the vote.

Woodhouse, who had previously lost re-election to the state senate in 2010, argued that the state needed legislators "who are looking out for middle-class working families," and emphasized the economy and education. Kirk, meanwhile, argued that the state government needed more private-sector experience. Both candidates said they considered themselves moderates, although Kirk also called himself "very conservative fiscally." Woodhouse ultimately won the election by around four points.

2012 Nevada State Senate election, District 5
Primary election
Party	Candidate	Votes	%
Republican	Steve Kirk	3,090	71.2
Republican	Annette Teijeiro	1,247	28.8
Total votes		4,337	100
General election
Democratic	Joyce Woodhouse	26,520	52.0
Republican	Steve Kirk	24,524	48.0
Total votes		51,044	100
Democratic hold			

=== Federal and statewide results ===
Year	Office	Results
2020	President	Biden 50.7 – 47.1%
2018	Senate	Rosen 52.5 – 43.4%
2018	Governor	Sisolak 51.8 – 43.5%
2016	President	Clinton 47.8 – 45.7%
2012	President	Obama 52.1 – 46.0%
2012	Senate	Berkley 45.5 – 45.1%

== History ==
District 5 came into existence in 2012 after the senate districts were redistricted as a result of the 2010 Census. The new districts went into effect for filing for office, and for nominating and electing senators on January 1, 2012, and for all other purposes on November 7 – the day after Election Day, when the new senator terms began. In the Nevada Revised Statutes, the area of the 5th district is defined using census tracts, block groups, and blocks.

It was originally known as Clark County Senate District 5 and was a dual member district. In the 1980s, it stretched from Sandy Valley toward Spring Valley, Enterprise and southern Paradise. In the 1990s, it contracted in size and stretched from northwest Las Vegas into Henderson. In the 2000s, it became based around most of Henderson.

Previous holders of the seat included Bill O'Donnell, Ann O'Connell, Sandra Tiffany, Joe Heck, Shirley Breeden and Michael Roberson.
