= John Moore (Nevada politician) =

American politician (born 1964)

Member of the Nevada Assembly from the 8th district
- In office November 5, 2014 – November 9, 2016
- Preceded by: Jason Frierson
- Succeeded by: Jason Frierson

Personal details
- Born: 1964 (age 61–62) Kansas City, Missouri, U.S.
- Party: Libertarian (2016-present)
- Other political affiliations: Democratic (before 2012); Republican (2012-2016)

John Moore (born 1964) is an American politician and business owner, who served as a member of the Nevada Assembly from 2014 to 2016. First elected as a Republican in 2014, he switched parties and became a Libertarian in January 2016.

== Early life ==
John Moore was born in 1964 in Kansas City, Missouri. After his father's premature death, he was forced to find a job. At age ten, he swept the floor and shined shoes at a local barber shop for one dollar per hour. Two years later, Moore's family moved to California, where he attended high school.

== Career ==
After high school, John enlisted in the US Army and was selected to be an Airborne Ranger, and graduated in the top 1% of his class at Ranger school. During his time in the military, Moore worked in the Special Operations community. After serving with the 1/75th Ranger Battalion, Moore was selected as a founding member of the 3/75th Ranger Battalion. Moore's military career spanned over 15 years of honorable service.

Following his military career, Moore worked as a real estate agent and in other business.

After 16 years in the private sector, Moore reentered the military following the September 11 attacks in 2001. Following re-enlistment, John Moore served in Iraq.

In 2012, Moore ran for a seat in the Nevada Assembly. Moore lost the Democratic Primary to Jason Frierson 67.6% to 32.4%. In 2014, Moore switched parties to run as a Republican and beat Frierson in the general election by 40 votes.

In 2014, Moore was elected to the Nevada Assembly, where he represented District 8. He was elected as a member of the Republican Party, but then joined the Libertarian Party of Nevada in January 2016, citing the largest tax hike in Nevada state history as a primary reason for switching parties.

In October 2016, the Libertarian National Committee (LNC) issued an official censure notice against Moore for voting twice in two days to raise taxes, including one for the purpose of building a taxpayer-financed NFL stadium in Las Vegas. He was also censured by the Libertarian Party of Nevada, which had made a priority of opposing both bills, and the state party withdrew its support for his re-election.

Moore lost his 2016 reelection bid, coming in third against his predecessor Jason Frierson.

== Electoral history ==
Nevada State Assembly, District 8: Results
Year	Democratic			Republican			Libertarian		
Year	Candidate	Votes	Pct	Candidate	Votes	Pct	Candidate	Votes	Pct
2016	Jason Frierson	12,060	56.1%	Norm Ross	7,978	37.1%	John Moore	1,464	6.8%
