= Barbara Buckley =

American politician

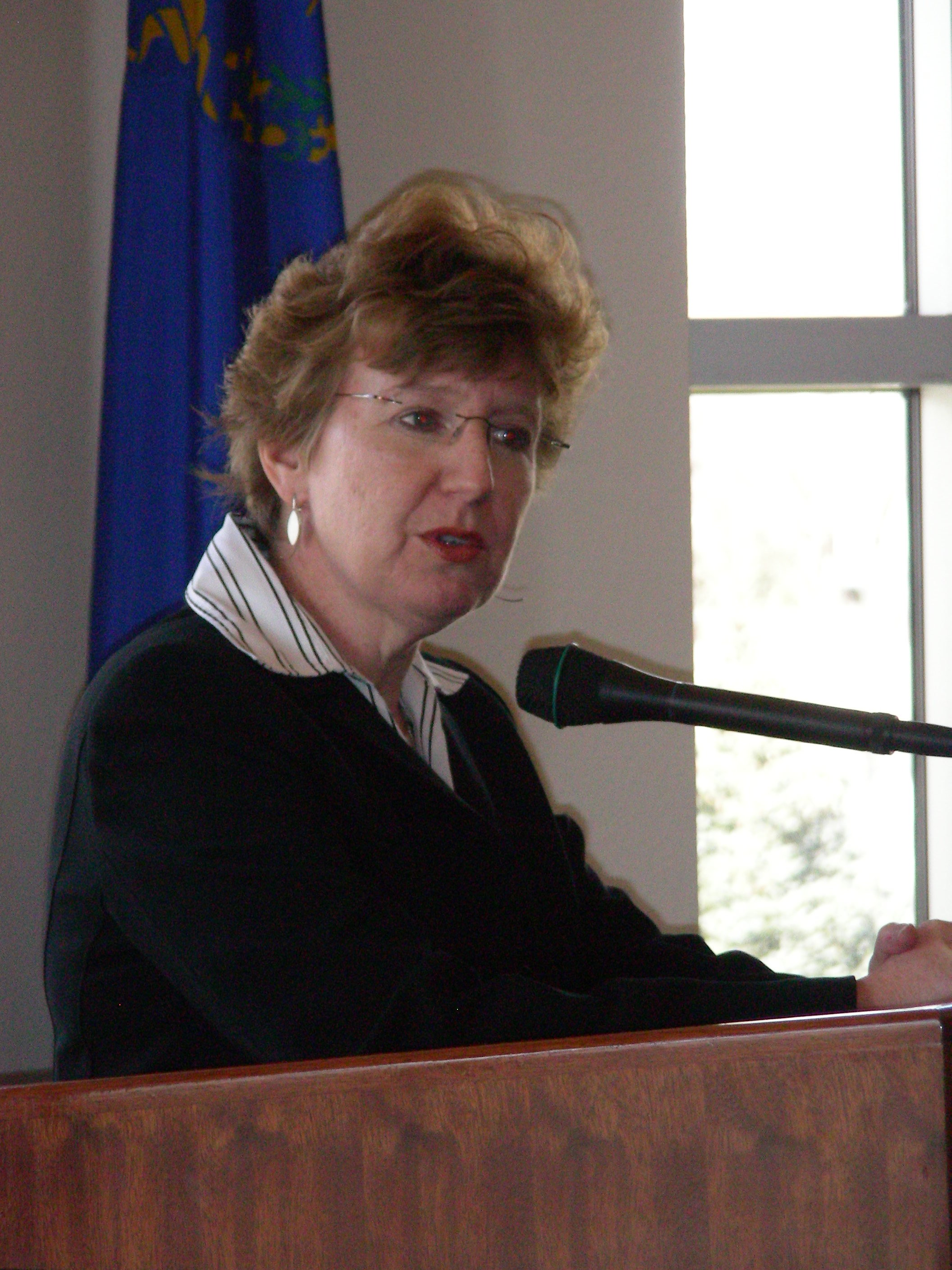
- Buckley in 2009

Speaker of the Nevada Assembly
- In office 2007 – February 7, 2011
- Preceded by: Richard Perkins
- Succeeded by: John Oceguera

Member of the Nevada Assembly from the 8th district
- In office 1995 – February 7, 2011
- Succeeded by: Jason Frierson

Personal details
- Born: November 23, 1960 (age 65) Philadelphia, Pennsylvania, U.S.
- Party: Democratic
- Spouse: Chan Kendrick
- Children: 2
- Education: University of Nevada, Las Vegas (BA); University of Arizona (JD)

Barbara Buckley (born November 23, 1960, in Philadelphia, Pennsylvania) is an American attorney and Democratic Party politician who served as a member of the Nevada Assembly, representing Clark County District 8 from 1995 to 2011, first being elected in 1994. She served as Assembly Speaker from 2007 to 2011, the first woman in Nevada history to serve as Speaker. She also served as Assistant Majority Floor Leader of the Assembly from 1997 to 1999, before serving as Majority Leader of the Assembly from 2001 to 2007, the first woman in Nevada history to serve as Majority Leader. Recently enacted term limits prevented Buckley from seeking re-election in the 2010 elections. She currently serves as executive director of Legal Aid Center of Southern Nevada and as the executive director of Clark County Legal Services in Las Vegas, Nevada, first rising to the position in 1996 One of her biggest accomplishments at the Legal Aid Center of Nevada is giving people free legal services and reuniting families. Before she became executive director, Buckley's career with Legal Aid Center of Southern Nevada began as a staff attorney in 1989. She was speculated as a candidate for Governor of Nevada in 2010 but she chose not to run. She considered running in 2014 but again declined to do so, saying that "I am not getting back into the political world".

== Awards and accolades ==
Buckley was recognized as most effective assembly representative six times during her legislative career across 1999, 2001, 2003, 2005, 2007, and 2009. She has also earned numerous educational and non-legislative professional awards, including UNLV's Alumni of the Year award in 2007, University of Arizona Law School's Outstanding Female Law Graduate award in 1989, and the State Bar of Nevada's Access to Justice Public Lawyer of the Year award in 2000.

== Impact and Legal Aid Work ==
During the 75th (2009) session, Barbara Buckley introduced AB187, a bill that authorized the establishment of Veterans Treatment Courts in Nevada. The bill went on to become Chapter 44 of Nevada law, and became effective July 1, 2009. The Veterans Treatment Court continues to operate in Clark County, Nevada as of 2026, and provides mental health and substance abuse treatment for veterans with the goal of "returning productive law-abiding citizens to the community".

As the head of the Legal Aid Center of Southern Nevada, Buckley has focused on getting more help to low-income residents. She's built programs for foster kids, domestic violence survivors, and people struggling with housing or consumer issues. Every year, the center assists tens of thousands of people across Clark County with their civil legal needs.

== Personal life ==
Buckley received a Bachelor of Arts (B.A.) degree from the University of Nevada, Las Vegas in 1986 and a Juris Doctor (J.D.) degree from the University of Arizona in 1989.

Buckley is married to Chan Kendrick and together they have two children named Aiden and Ford.

Legislative biographies on Buckley note some of her interests/hobbies as family, reading, hiking, and traveling.

== See also ==
- List of female speakers of legislatures in the United States
- List of Nevada state legislatures
