= Senator Tiffany =

Senator Tiffany may refer to:

- Sandra Tiffany (born 1949), Nevada State Senate
- Tom Tiffany (born 1957), Wisconsin State Senate
