= 2016 Nevada Senate election =

- November 8, 2016

11 of the 21 seats in the Nevada State Senate 10 seats needed for a majority
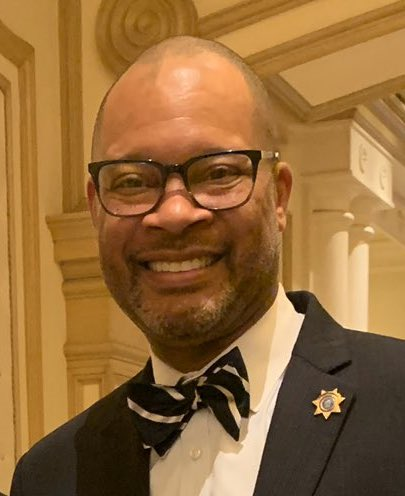

	Majority party	Minority party
Leader	Aaron Ford	Michael Roberson
Party	Democratic	Republican
Leader's seat	11th	20th
Last election	10	11
Seats won	11	10
Seat change	▲1	▼1
Popular vote	271,523	217,829
Percentage	51.32%	41.17%
- Results: Democratic gain Democratic hold Republican hold No election
Leader of the Senate before election
Michael Roberson
Republican
Elected Leader of the Senate
Aaron Ford
Democratic

The 2016 Nevada Senate election took place as part of the biennial United States elections. Nevada voters elected state senators in 11 of the state senate's 21 districts. State senators serve four-year terms in the Nevada Senate.

A primary election on June 14, 2016, determined which candidates appear on the November 8 general election ballot. Primary election results can be obtained from the State of Nevada's Secretary of State website.

On election day 2016, there were 11 Republicans and 10 Democrats in the Nevada Senate; in the 2014 state senate elections, they had gained a one-seat majority. In the 2016 election Democrats flipped it back, winning 11 seats.

== Party registration advantage by district ==
Voter Registration by September 2016
District	Democratic Active Voters	Republican Active Voters	Other Parties Active Voters	Nonpartisan Active Voters	Total Active Voters	Registration Edge Major Parties
District 1	33,146	17,223	3,751	13,697	66,817	D +14,923
District 3	25,650	12,039	3,108	11,146	51,943	D +13,611
District 4	33,158	7,682	3,223	11,639	55,702	D +25,476
District 5	26,886	23,143	4,107	13,915	68,048	D +3,740
District 6	28,867	24,176	3,986	13,565	70,954	D +4,691
District 7	28,629	15,156	3,918	14,155	61,858	D +13,473
District 11	24,074	13,751	3,060	11,785	52,670	D +10,323
District 13	28,018	17,474	4,912	13,829	64,233	D +10,544
District 15	29,048	30,689	5,457	15,018	80,212	R +1,641
District 18	27,031	28,948	4,442	14,454	74,875	R +1,917
District 19	16,986	34,013	4,948	12,153	68,100	R +17,027

== Predictions ==
Source	Ranking	As of
Governing	Tossup	October 12, 2016

== Results ==
=== Summary of results by State Senate district ===
- For districts not displayed, there is no election until 2018.

State Senate District	Incumbent	Party	Elected Senator	Party
1st	Patricia Spearman	Democratic	Patricia Spearman	Democratic
3rd	Richard Segerblom	Democratic	Richard Segerblom	Democratic
4th	Kelvin Atkinson	Democratic	Kelvin Atkinson	Democratic
5th	Joyce Woodhouse	Democratic	Joyce Woodhouse	Democratic
6th	Mark Hutchison	Republican	Nicole Cannizzaro	Democratic
7th	David Parks	Democratic	David Parks	Democratic
11th	Aaron Ford	Democratic	Aaron Ford	Democratic
13th	Julia Ratti	Democratic	Julia Ratti	Democratic
15th	Greg Brower	Republican	Heidi Gansert	Republican
18th	Scott Hammond	Republican	Scott Hammond	Republican
19th	Peter Goicoechea	Republican	Peter Goicoechea	Republican

=== Detailed results by State Senate district ===
General Election - November 8, 2016
District	Party	Candidates	Votes	Percentage	Result
District 1	Dem	Pat Spearman (incumbent)	33,688	65.43%	Spearman Reelected Democratic Hold
District 1	Rep	Arsen Ter-Petrosyan	17,800	34.57%	Spearman Reelected Democratic Hold
District 3	Dem	Tick Segerblom (incumbent)	21,195	60.31%	Segerblom Reelected Democratic Hold
District 3	Rep	Dennis Palmerston	11,057	31.46%	Segerblom Reelected Democratic Hold
District 3	LPN	Jonathan Friedrich	2,889	8.22%	Segerblom Reelected Democratic Hold
District 4	Dem	Kelvin Atkinson (incumbent)	29,912	100%	Atkinson Reelected Democratic Hold
District 5	Dem	Joyce Woodhouse (incumbent)	26,208	47.89%	Woodhouse Reelected Democratic Hold
District 5	Rep	Carrie Buck	25,739	47.03%	Woodhouse Reelected Democratic Hold
District 5	LPN	Tim Hagan	2,784	5.09%	Woodhouse Reelected Democratic Hold
District 6	Dem	Nicole Cannizzaro	28,733	50.92%	Cannizzaro Elected Democratic Change
District 6	Rep	Victoria Seaman	27,697	49.08%	Cannizzaro Elected Democratic Change
District 7	Dem	David Parks (incumbent)	28,379	69.54%	Parks Reelected Democratic Hold
District 7	LPN	Kimberly Schjang	12,432	30.46%	Parks Reelected Democratic Hold
District 11	Dem	Aaron D. Ford (incumbent)	22,439	57.7%	Ford Reelected Democratic Hold
District 11	Rep	Jon Frazier	14,221	36.57%	Ford Reelected Democratic Hold
District 11	LPN	Lesley Chan	2,229	5.73%	Ford Reelected Democratic Hold
District 13	Dem	Julia Ratti (Incumbent)	27,280	59.96%	Ratti Elected Democratic Hold
District 13	Rep	Kent Bailey	15,811	34.75%	Ratti Elected Democratic Hold
District 13	LPN	Brandon Jacobs	2,406	5.29%	Ratti Elected Democratic Hold
District 15	Dem	Devon Reese	26,773	41.92%	Gansert Elected Republican Hold
District 15	Rep	Heidi Gansert	33,822	52.96%	Gansert Elected Republican Hold
District 15	LPN	David Colborne (Libertarian)	3,266	5.11%	Gansert Elected Republican Hold
District 18	Dem	Alexander Marks	26,864	43.56%	Hammond Reelected Republican Hold
District 18	Rep	Scott Hammond (incumbent)	34,805	56.44%	Hammond Reelected Republican Hold
District 19	Rep	Pete Goicoechea (incumbent)	36,876	72.96%	Goicoechea Reelected Republican Hold
District 19	IAPN	Janine Hansen	13,664	27.04	Goicoechea Reelected Republican Hold

== See also ==
- List of Nevada state legislatures
