= Melissa Woodbury =

American politician (born 1969)

Member of the Nevada Assembly from the 23rd district
- In office November 5, 2008 – November 7, 2018
- Preceded by: RoseMary Womack
- Succeeded by: Glen Leavitt

Personal details
- Born: 1969 (age 56–57) Palo Alto, California
- Party: Republican
- Education: Brigham Young University; Southern Utah University
- Website: melissawoodbury.com

Melissa Woodbury (born in 1969 in Palo Alto, California) is an American politician. She served as a Republican member of the Nevada Assembly from 2008 to 2018 representing District 23 (southern Clark County including Boulder City, Laughlin, and parts of Henderson). Woodbury served as Minority Whip in the 2017 legislative session.

== Background ==
Woodbury earned her BS in special education from Brigham Young University and her MEd from Southern Utah University. She is a teacher by profession. The Woodbury family is prominent in Nevada politics, including Woodbury's father, former Clark County Commissioner Bruce Woodbury; her brother, former Boulder City Mayor Rod Woodbury; her great-uncle, former Speaker of the Nevada Assembly Jack Higgins; and her brother-in-law, Glen Leavitt.

== Elections ==
- 2016 Woodbury won the primary election with 3,929 votes (71.99%) against Swadeep Nigam. Woodbury won the general election with 24,696 votes (66.96%) against Democratic nominee Craig Jordahl.
- 2014 Woodbury was unopposed for both the primary and the general election.
- 2012 Woodbury was unopposed for the June 12, 2012 Republican Primary and won the November 6, 2012 General election with 21,577 votes (65.03%) against Democratic nominee Michael Joe.
- 2010 Woodbury was unopposed for the June 8, 2010 Republican Primary and won the November 2, 2010 General election with 7,952 votes (58.93%) against Democratic nominee Monica Bean.
- 2008 After Democratic Assemblywoman RoseMary Womack left the Assembly and left the District 23 seat open, Woodbury was unopposed for the August 12, 2008 Republican Primary and won the November 4, 2008 General election with 9,307 votes (51.83%) against Democratic nominee Allison Herr.
