= Vulnerable Veterans Housing Reform Act of 2013 =

U.S. Congress legislation

- Long title: To exclude from consideration as income under the United States Housing Act of 1937 payments of pension made under section 1521 of title 38, United States Code, to veterans who are in need of regular aid and attendance, and for other purposes.
- Announced in: the 113th United States Congress
- Sponsored by: Rep. Joseph J. Heck (R, NV-3)
- Number of co-sponsors: 6

Codification
- Acts affected: United States Housing Act of 1937
- U.S.C. sections affected: 42 U.S.C. § 1437a, 42 U.S.C. § 1437f, 38 U.S.C. § 1521
- Agencies affected: Department of Housing and Urban Development

Legislative history
- Introduced in the House as H.R. 1742 by Rep. Joseph J. Heck (R, NV-3) on April 25, 2013; Committee consideration by United States House Committee on Financial Services

The Vulnerable Veterans Housing Reform Act of 2013 (H.R. 1742) is a bill that would change the way the United States Department of Housing and Urban Development (HUD) calculates a veterans' income to exclude some aid that some veterans receive from the United States Department of Veterans Affairs (VA). Excluding this aid from the VA would reduce the calculated income of these veterans, likely making them eligible for additional aid from HUD that they might not have received if their assistance from the VA was included. The bill would also change how utility allowances are calculated for HUD-assisted housing by basing "utility allowances on the unit the size permitted by a local public housing agency, even if the family has rented a larger unit at its own additional cost." This change would offset the cost to the federal government of the VA aid exemption in determining a veterans income. The bill was introduced into the United States House of Representatives during the 113th United States Congress.

== Background ==
A previous version of this bill, called the Vulnerable Veterans Housing Reform Act of 2012 (H.R. 6361), was passed by the House in 2012. Although the bill passed the House, it never passed the Senate, and therefore "died" in the 112th United States Congress. The bill was then reintroduced in the 113th Congress as H.R. 825. This version of the bill was introduced by Rep. Heck on February 26, 2013. H.R. 825 is shorter than H.R. 1742 and does not include any provisions about utilities.

== Provisions of the bill ==
This summary is based largely on the summary provided by the Congressional Research Service, a public domain source.

The Vulnerable Veterans Housing Reform Act of 2013 would amend the United States Housing Act of 1937 to exclude as family income for Department of Housing and Urban Development (HUD) housing assistance purposes any Department of Veterans Affairs (VA) payments made to veterans in need of regular aid and attendance for expenses related to such aid and attendance.

The bill would prohibit, in determining the monthly rental assistance payment for low-income families, the amount for tenant-paid utilities from exceeding the appropriate utility allowance for that family unit size as determined by the public housing agency (PHA), regardless of the size of the unit leased by the family. It would require the PHA, upon request by a family that includes a person with disabilities, an elderly family, or a family that includes a person less than 18 years old, to approve a higher utility allowance, except that in the case of a family with a disabled person the PHA shall approve the higher amount only when needed as a reasonable accommodation to make the unit accessible to and usable by that person.

It would direct the HUD Secretary to regularly publish data regarding local utility consumption and costs in order to establish appropriate allowances for tenant-paid utilities for assisted families.

== Congressional Budget Office report ==
According to the House Republican Conference, the Congressional Budget Office issued an informal report that the exemption of VA aid payments from HUD calculations "would cost $34 million over five years, while the adjustment of the utilities provision would save $80 million over five years."

== Procedural history ==
=== House ===
The Vulnerable Veterans Housing Reform Act of 2013 was introduced in the United States House of Representatives on April 25, 2013, by Rep. Joseph J. Heck (R, NV-3). It was referred to the United States House Committee on Financial Services. On October 25, 2013, House Majority Leader Eric Cantor announced that H.R. 1742 would be on the House schedule for the week of October 28, 2013. It was scheduled for a vote on October 28, 2013, under a suspension of the rules. The House was expected to deal with six different bills related to Veterans all on the same day, including this bill.

== See also ==
- List of bills in the 113th United States Congress
- United States Department of Housing and Urban Development
- United States Housing Act of 1937
- Public housing in the United States
