= Walter Andonov =

American politician

Member of the Nevada Assembly from the 21st district
- In office November 6, 2002 – November 3, 2004
- Preceded by: Sandra Tiffany
- Succeeded by: Bob Seale

Personal details
- Born: January 5, 1969 (age 57)
- Party: Republican

Walter Andonov (born January 5, 1969) is an American politician who served in the Nevada Assembly from the 21st district from 2002 to 2004.
