= Ann O'Connell =

American politician (1934–2026)

Member of the Nevada Senate from the 5th district
- In office November 7, 1984 – November 3, 2004
- Succeeded by: Joe Heck

Personal details
- Born: August 3, 1934 Albuquerque, New Mexico, U.S.
- Died: August 21, 2026 (aged 92) Las Vegas, Nevada, U.S.
- Party: Republican
- Spouse: Robert E. O'Connell
- Children: 2
- Profession: Businesswoman

Ann O'Connell (August 3, 1934 – August 21, 2026) was an American politician who was a Republican member of the Nevada State Senate from 1984 to 2004.

== Life and career ==
O'Connell was born in Albuquerque, New Mexico on August 3, 1934. She was first elected to the Senate in 1984, and her tenure ended in 2004. She was the former owner and manager of Christian Supply Centers and Hotel. She is recipient of various awards, including Woman of Achievement Award in Politics, Guardian of Liberty Award, and Legislator of the Year. She has two sons and resided in Las Vegas.

O'Connell died in Las Vegas, Nevada on August 21, 2026, at the age of 92.
