= RoseMary Womack =

American politician (born 1942)

Member of the Nevada Assembly from the 23rd district
- In office November 8, 2006 – November 5, 2008
- Preceded by: Richard Perkins
- Succeeded by: Melissa Woodbury

Personal details
- Born: 1942 (age 83–84) Cleveland, Ohio
- Party: Democratic
- Education: College of Southern Nevada

RoseMary Womack (born in 1942 in Cleveland, Ohio) is an American politician. She served as a Democratic member of the Nevada Assembly from 2006 to 2008 representing District 23, covering parts of Henderson).

== Background ==
Womack attended Cuyahoga Community College and College of Southern Nevada. She is a retired real estate agent and administrator of an assisted living facility.

== Elections ==
- 2006 Womack won the primary election with 2,154 votes (71.99%) against Larry M. Jeppesen. Womack won the general election with 5,863 votes (51.35%) against Republican nominee Steven Grierson.
