= John Hambrick (politician) =

American politician (1945–2024)

Speaker of the Nevada Assembly
- In office February 2, 2015 – February 6, 2017
- Preceded by: Marilyn Kirkpatrick
- Succeeded by: Jason Frierson

Member of the Nevada Assembly from the 2nd district
- In office November 5, 2008 – November 4, 2020
- Preceded by: Garn Mabey
- Succeeded by: Heidi Kasama

Personal details
- Born: June 12, 1945 White Bear Lake, Minnesota, U.S.
- Died: November 13, 2024 (aged 79) White Bear Lake, Minnesota, U.S.
- Party: Republican
- Education: University of Minnesota, Twin Cities
- Website: Archived Campaign website

John Hambrick (June 12, 1945 – November 13, 2024) was an American politician who served as a Republican member of the Nevada Assembly. He represented Clark District 2 from November 5, 2008, to November 4, 2020.

Hambrick was born on June 12, 1945. He attended multiple law enforcement institutes, including the Federal Law Enforcement Training Center.

Hambrick died from cancer on November 13, 2024, at the age of 79.

== Elections ==
- 2012 Hambrick was unopposed for both the June 12, 2012, Republican Primary and the November 6, 2012, General election, winning with 19,766 votes.
- 2008 When Republican Assemblyman Garn Mabey retired and left the District 2 seat open, Hambrick won the three-way August 12, 2008, Republican Primary with 1,295 votes (57.61%), and won the four-way November 4, 2008, General election with 11,781 votes (49.76%) against Democratic nominee Carlos Blumberg, Independent American candidate Jon Kamerath, and Libertarian candidate Edward Klapproth; Blumberg and Kamerath had challenged Mabey for the seat in 2006.
- 2010 Hambrick won the three-way June 8, 2010, Republican Primary with 2,866 votes (62.51%), and won the November 2, 2010, General election with 11,057 votes (57.73%) against Democratic nominee David Lerner and Independent American candidate Jon Kamerath.
- In 2020, Hambrick was unable to run for re-election, as he was term limited.
