= Bruce L. Woodbury =

American attorney and politician

Member of the Clark County Commission from District A
- In office 1981 – January 5, 2009
- Preceded by: Robert Broadbent
- Succeeded by: Steve Sisolak

Personal details
- Born: Bruce Lund Woodbury; December 15, 1944 (age 81) Las Vegas, Nevada, U.S.
- Party: Republican
- Education: Las Vegas High School
- Alma mater: Stanford Law School (J.D.); University of Utah
- Occupation: Attorney and politician

Bruce Lund Woodbury (born December 15, 1944) is an American attorney and politician. He is a member of the Republican Party.

Woodbury graduated from Las Vegas High School, the University of Utah and Stanford Law School.

Woodbury spent several years on the Clark County Commission. The Bruce Woodbury Beltway was named after him.

== Biography ==
Woodbury's political career began when he was appointed to the Clark County Commission to fill an open seat in 1981 in District A. He was elected in 1982 to a full term and was re-elected every four years until he left office on January 5, 2009. He was unable to run for re-election in 2008 due to term limits.

Woodbury had twice served as commission chairman. First from 1989 to 1990 and again from 1999 to 2000.

Woodbury was appointed on the Las Vegas Monorail Company Board of Directors on February 3, 2009.

The Woodbury family is prominent in Nevada politics, including Woodbury's son, former Boulder City Mayor Rod Woodbury; his daughter, former Assemblywoman Melissa Woodbury; his uncle, former Speaker of the Nevada Assembly Jack Higgins; and his son-in-law, Glen Leavitt.

Political offices
Preceded by Robert Broadbent	Member of the Clark County Commission from District A 1981 – January 5, 2009	Succeeded by Steve Sisolak
