= Good Samaritan Search and Recovery Act of 2013 =

United States bill facilitating volunteer searches on fesderal land

- Long title: To direct the Secretary of the Interior and Secretary of Agriculture to expedite access to certain Federal lands under the administrative jurisdiction of each Secretary for good Samaritan search-and-recovery missions, and for other purposes.
- Announced in: the 113th United States Congress
- Sponsored by: Rep. Joseph J. Heck (R, NV-3)
- Number of co-sponsors: 1

Codification
- Acts affected: Federal Torts Claim Act, Volunteers in the Parks Act of 1969, Federal Employee Compensation Act
- U.S.C. sections affected: 16 U.S.C. § 18i
- Agencies affected: United States Congress, United States Department of Agriculture, United States Department of the Interior

Legislative history
- Introduced in the House as H.R. 2166 by Rep. Joseph J. Heck (R, NV-3) on May 23, 2013; Committee consideration by United States House Committee on Natural Resources, United States House Committee on Agriculture, United States House Natural Resources Subcommittee on Public Lands and Environmental Regulation, United States House Agriculture Subcommittee on Conservation, Energy, and Forestry

The Good Samaritan Search and Recovery Act of 2013 (H.R. 2166) is a United States bill that would make it easier for qualified volunteer groups to conduct searches for missing persons on federal land. The federal government would be required to issue a permit within 48 hours. Volunteer groups would also be excused from a requirement that they buy insurance if they are willing to waive all federal liability.

The Good Samaritan Search and Recovery Act of 2013 was introduced into the United States House of Representatives during the 113th United States Congress.

== Provisions of the bill ==
This summary is based largely on the summary provided by the Congressional Research Service, a public domain source.

The Good Samaritan Search and Recovery Act of 2013 would direct the Secretary of the Interior and the Secretary of Agriculture (USDA) to implement a process to provide eligible organizations and individuals expedited access to federal lands to conduct good Samaritan search-and-recovery missions.

The bill would set forth procedures for the approval or denial of requests made by eligible organizations or individuals to carry out a good Samaritan search-and-recovery mission.

The bill would require the Secretary of the Interior and the Secretary of Agriculture to develop search-and-recovery focused partnerships with search-and-recovery organizations to: (1) coordinate good Samaritan search-and-recovery missions on such lands, and (2) expedite and accelerate mission efforts for missing individuals on such lands.

== Congressional Budget Office report ==
This summary is based largely on the summary provided by the Congressional Budget Office, as ordered reported by the House Committee on Natural Resources on June 12, 2013. This is a public domain source.

H.R. 2166 would authorize the Secretary of the Interior and the Secretary of Agriculture to expedite access to federal lands for search and recovery missions conducted by eligible individuals or organizations. Under the bill, entities conducting search and recovery missions would not be considered federal employees or volunteers, and the federal government would not be liable for the actions of such entities.

Based on information provided by the Department of the Interior and the Forest Service, the Congressional Budget Office (CBO) expects that the costs of expediting access to federal lands for search and recovery purposes would be minimal, and we estimate that implementing the legislation would have no significant impact on the federal budget. Enacting H.R. 2166 would not affect direct spending or revenues; therefore, pay-as-you-go procedures do not apply.

H.R. 2166 contains no intergovernmental or private-sector mandates as defined in the Unfunded Mandates Reform Act and would not affect the budgets of state, local, or tribal governments.

== Procedural history ==
The Good Samaritan Search and Recovery Act of 2013 was introduced into the United States House of Representatives on May 23, 2013 by Rep. Joseph J. Heck (R, NV-3). It was referred to the United States House Committee on Natural Resources, the United States House Committee on Agriculture, the United States House Natural Resources Subcommittee on Public Lands and Environmental Regulation, and the United States House Agriculture Subcommittee on Conservation, Energy, and Forestry. It was reported out of the Committee on Natural Resources alongside House Report 331 - part 1 on January 23, 2014. On January 24, 2014, House Majority Leader Eric Cantor announced the H.R. 2166 would be considered under a suspension of the rules on January 27, 2014.

== Debate and discussion ==
Rep. Joe Heck said that he proposed the bill in response to two situations in Nevada where it had taken the federal government a year to get two groups of volunteers the correct permits to search for two missing men. The remains of murder victim Keith Goldberg were found by a private rescue firm within two hours, but only after waiting 15 months for the correct permits. Another man's remains were found in two days after a ten-month wait.

Senator Dean Heller, who sponsored the bill in the Senate, argued that "the last thing families who have lost loved ones need is the federal government to stand in the way of recovering their remains."

== See also ==
- List of bills in the 113th United States Congress
- Parable of the Good Samaritan - origin of the phrase "Good Samaritan"
- Good Samaritan law - other Good Samaritan laws
