= Joyce Woodhouse =

American politician (1944–2026)

Member of the Nevada Senate from the 5th district
- In office 2012 – November 4, 2020
- Preceded by: Shirley Breeden
- Succeeded by: Carrie A. Buck

Member of the Nevada Senate from the Clark County 5th district
- In office 2006–2010 Serving with Shirley Breeden (2008–2010); Joe Heck (2006–2008)
- Preceded by: Sandra Tiffany
- Succeeded by: Michael Roberson

Personal details
- Born: 1944 Wibaux, Montana, U.S.
- Died: May 8, 2026 (aged 82)
- Party: Democratic
- Spouse: Al Wittenberg
- Education: Carroll College; University of Nevada, Las Vegas
- Profession: Educator

Joyce Woodhouse (1944 – May 8, 2026) was an American politician who was a member of the Nevada Senate. She represented the 5th district from 2006 to 2010 and then from 2012 to 2019, when she became unable to run for re-election due to term limits.

== Early life and education ==
Woodhouse was born in Wibaux, Montana, in 1944. She was the oldest of five daughters and grew up on her father's Hereford cattle ranch. She attended Carroll College, where she received a bachelor's of arts degree in elementary education, and then the University of Nevada, Las Vegas, where she received two master's degrees in curriculum and instruction and in educational leadership. She worked as a teacher, an elementary school principal and a program administrator. She was married to Al Wittenberg. She worked as a legislative lobbyist for the Nevada State Education Association.

== Political career ==
Woodhouse was first elected to the Nevada Senate in November 2006, holding office until November 2010.

She faced no opposition in the 2012 Democratic primary for the 5th Senate district and went on to challenge Republican Steve Kirk in the general election. She focused on the economy and education in her campaign, and won the election by 51.96% to 48.04%.

Woodhouse faced Nicholas Lash, a political newcomer inspired by senator and presidential candidate Bernie Sanders, in the 2016 Democratic primary. She won with 85.48% of the vote, and faced Republican Carrie Buck and Libertarian Tim Hagan in the general election. Woodhouse out-raised Buck by $500,000 to $140,000, and won re-election by less than one percentage point, winning by 47.89% to 47.03%.

In 2017, Woodhouse faced a recall effort led by Republican Stephen Silberkraus. The state Democratic party sued, stating that 5,500 signatures on the petition were invalid, as the result of people signing who were not registered to vote in Woodhouse's district or people who later asked to have their signatures removed. A separate lawsuit was filed by the party challenging the validity of the recall itself, led by lawyers Marc Elias and Bradley Schrager. In April 2018, Secretary of State Barbara Cegavske declared that the recall effort had failed to receive enough signatures following a recount.

She was co-minority whip in 2016 and then became the co-majority whip in 2017 and the chief majority whip in 2019.

== Death ==
Woodhouse died on May 8, 2026, at the age of 82.
