= Shirley Breeden =

American politician (born 1955)

Member of the Nevada Senate from the 5th district
- In office 2009–2012
- Preceded by: Joe Heck
- Succeeded by: Joyce Woodhouse

Personal details
- Born: Needles, California, U.S.
- Party: Democratic

Shirley Breeden (born 1955) is an American politician who served as a member of the Nevada Senate for the 5th district from 2009 to 2012.

== Early life and education ==
Breeden was born in Needles, California and raised in Las Vegas. After graduating from Ed W. Clark High School, she attended the College of Southern Nevada and took business courses at the University of Nevada, Las Vegas.

== Career ==
Breeden was elected to the Nevada Senate in 2008, narrowly defeating incumbent Republican Joe Heck. She was the plaintiff in the Supreme Court Case Clark County School Dist. v. Breeden.
