= Richard Perkins (politician) =

American politician

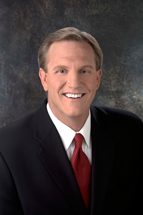

Member of the Nevada Assembly from the 23rd district
- In office November 4, 1992 – November 8, 2006
- Preceded by: Jim Gibbons
- Succeeded by: RoseMary Womack

Speaker of the Nevada Assembly
- In office January 2001 – November 2006
- Preceded by: Joseph E. Dini Jr.
- Succeeded by: Barbara Buckley

10th Chief of Police, Henderson, Nevada
- In office April 2006 – September 2008
- Preceded by: Alan Kerstein
- Succeeded by: Jutta Chambers

Personal details
- Born: November 15, 1961 (age 64) Boulder City, Nevada
- Party: Democratic
- Spouse: Sasha Sutcliffe-Stephenson
- Children: 3
- Education: University of Nevada, Las Vegas
- Profession: President/CEO The Perkins Company Co-Founder/CEO Business Council of Canada and Nevada

Richard Perkins (born in 1961) is an American politician and former police officer. He served as a Democratic member of the Nevada Assembly from 1992 to 2006 representing District 23, covering parts of Henderson. Perkins served as floor leader from 1995 to 2001 and as Speaker of the Assembly from 2001 to 2006. He served as chief of police for the Henderson Police Department from 2006-2008.

== Early life and education ==
Perkins was born in Boulder City, Nevada and grew up in Henderson. He graduated from Basic High School, where he was an All-American football player and a state wrestling champion. He was recruited to play college football at universities on the west coast, including at the University of Nevada-Reno, but ultimately decided to attend the University of Nevada, Las Vegas where he obtained a BA in criminal justice and political science. He is a Council of State Governments Toll Fellow, an American Swiss Foundation Young Political Leader, a Leadership Las Vegas graduate, and an attendee of the Harvard Kennedy School.

== Nevada Assembly ==
Perkins was elected to the Nevada Assembly in 1992 and was re-elected six additional times. He was elected Co-Floor Leader in 1995, during his second term in office, when the Nevada Assembly was evenly split among Democrats and Republicans with 21 members each. He became Majority Floor Leader when Democrats won the majority in the Nevada Assembly in 1996 and served in that role until being elected Speaker of the Nevada Assembly in 2001. Perkins was a primary sponsor on a number of high-profile bills. He introduced and passed Assembly Bill 220 (1999), establishing Nevada State College in Henderson to meet a growing need for higher education in Southern Nevada.

In 2000, Perkins introduced the Sherrice Iverson Good Samaritan Law, named after a 7 year-old girl murdered by Jeremy Strohmeyer in Primm, Nevada. David Cash, an associate of Strohmeyer’s, witnessed the crime but never reported it to police or tried to intervene and was never charged with a crime. Perkins’ bill requires Nevadans to notify police if they witness violent acts being committed against a child.

He also authored Assembly Bill 27 (2001), which prohibited the placement of juveniles performing community service along a highway or at another dangerous location; Assembly Bill 250 (2003) and Assembly Bill 441 (2003), which created Nevada's homeland security laws governing acts of terrorism and related emergencies; and Assembly Bill 322 (2003), which created a statewide alert system for the safe return of abducted children.

The most significant event during Perkins' tenure in the legislature was the budget dispute of 2003. Nevada's tax structure has traditionally been heavily dependent on sales and gaming taxes. After 9/11, tourism was sharply reduced, which caused a substantial hole in the state budget. Republican governor Kenny Guinn proposed a $980 million increase in revenue to fill this hole. However, while the legislature was able to pass the governor's budget with a simple majority, anti-tax Republicans in the Assembly refused to vote for it and so the budget was denied a 2/3 majority. This provoked a constitutional crisis, since Nevada's Constitution requires a 2/3 majority for revenue-generating bills and also requires that K-12 education be funded. Guinn called two special sessions of the legislature, neither of which was able to pass an education budget with the required majority. Ultimately, the Supreme Court of Nevada was required to rule on the crisis, and held that the education funding requirement took precedence over the 2/3 majority requirement.

Perkins considered running in the 2006 Nevada gubernatorial election but ultimately decided not to.

== Elections ==
- 2004 Perkins was unopposed in the primary, and won the general election with 9,618 votes (58.48%) against Republican nominee Steven Grierson.
- 2002 Perkins was unopposed in both the primary and the general election.
- 2000 Perkins was unopposed in the primary, and won the general election with 7,093 votes (62.69%) against Republican nominee Michael Cannon.
- 1998 Perkins was unopposed in the primary, and won the general election with 5,373 votes (68.28%) against Republican nominee Troy A. La Mana.
- 1996 Perkins was unopposed in the primary, and won the general election with 5,507 votes (64.81%) against Republican nominee Jim Born.
- 1994 Perkins was unopposed in both the primary and the general election.
- 1992 Perkins was unopposed in the primary, and won the general election with 5,508 votes (66.44%) against Republican nominee Allen R. Chastain.

== Law enforcement career ==
Perkins joined the Henderson Police Department in 1984 and was elected as president of the Henderson Police Association in 1986. He was appointed interim chief of police for the department in June 2006 (cite Henderson Home Newspaper) and made permanent chief a month later, serving in this role until his retirement in 2008. He said growth as the biggest challenge of the job in his retirement, noting that there were just 31 officers when he joined the department as an officer in 1984 which grew to 391 officers and a budget of $70 million when he retired.

Perkins was recognized for his work with crime victims and in 1991 was honored by the Clark County District Attorney and the Nevada Attorney General. He attended the 183rd Session of the FBI National Academy in 1995 and is active in the Nevada Sheriffs and Chiefs Association and the International Association of Chiefs of Police.

== Post legislative and law enforcement careers ==
After retiring as a legislator and chief of police, Perkins opened his own lobbying firm, counting clients such as Newmont and the city of Henderson.

He served on the board of directors for Paramount Bank of Nevada, Opportunity Village, and several other non-profit boards and committees. In 2024, Perkins joined the board of directors for the Democracy Defense Project, a bipartisan group that seeks to defend the integrity of voting systems and restore faith in elections. Other board members include former Republican governors Brian Sandoval, Jan Brewer, and John Sununu and former Democratic Governors Ed Rendell and Roy Barnes.

== Personal life ==
Perkins has three children and lives with his wife in Henderson.

== See also ==
- List of Nevada state legislatures
