= Lawrence Jacobsen =

American politician

Member of the Nevada Senate from the Western Nevada district
- In office 1978–2002

Member of the Nevada General Assembly
- In office 1963–1977

Personal details
- Born: July 1, 1921 Gardnerville, Nevada, United States
- Died: July 26, 2006 (aged 85) Minden, Nevada, United States
- Party: Republican
- Spouse: Betty Lundergreen

Lawrence E. Jacobsen (July 1, 1921 – July 26, 2006), was an American politician who was a Republican member of the Nevada General Assembly. He served in the Assembly from 1963 to 1977 and the Senate from 1978 to 2002.

During his time in the Senate, he was Speaker pro tempore in 1969, and President pro tempore from 1987 to 1990 and from 1993 to 1995. He served in the United States Navy during World War II and is a Pearl Harbor survivor. He was retired from the petroleum products industry. Jacobsen died at the age of 85 in 2006.

== Legislative Service ==
He served at Nevada Assembly during 1963- 1977 and at Nevada Senate during 1979-2001 as well as seven special and 20 regular sessions (longest legislative service in Nevada history).

=== Legislative Commission ===
He was an Alternate during 1963-1964, 1967-1968, 1991-1993, a member during 1965-1966, 1969-1983, 1985-1986, 1995-1996, a Vice Chairman in 1966, a Chairman during 1970-1971, 1974-1975, 1987-1988. He was member of Interim Finance Committee during 1985-1992, 1995-1998, speaker pro Tempore in 1969, speaker of the Assembly in 1971; Assembly Minority Floor Leader in 1973, Senate Minority Floor Leader in 1981; President pro Tempore during 1987-1990, 1993-2001, and Chairman of National Legislative Service and Security Advisory Committee.

=== National Conference of State Legislatures ===
He was Member of Executive Committee during 1981-1990, Co-Chairman of Fourteenth Annual Meeting in Reno in 1988, Vice Chairman at Twenty-fourth Annual Meeting in Las Vegas in 1998.

=== Council of State Governments ===
He was Member of Hazardous Waste Committee and Executive Committee during 1981-1990, Chairman of Energy Committee during 1981-1983; Vice Chairman, during 1984-1985, and Chairman, during 1986-1987.

=== Western Legislative Conference ===
He was Chairman of Marlette Lake Water System Advisory Committee during 1969-94, 1999-2000, Chairman of Nevada Veterans' Services Commission during 1997-2000.

== Personal life ==
He married with Betty Lundergreen in Gardnerville, on May 13, 1951.
