= Joe Heck =

American politician (born 1961)

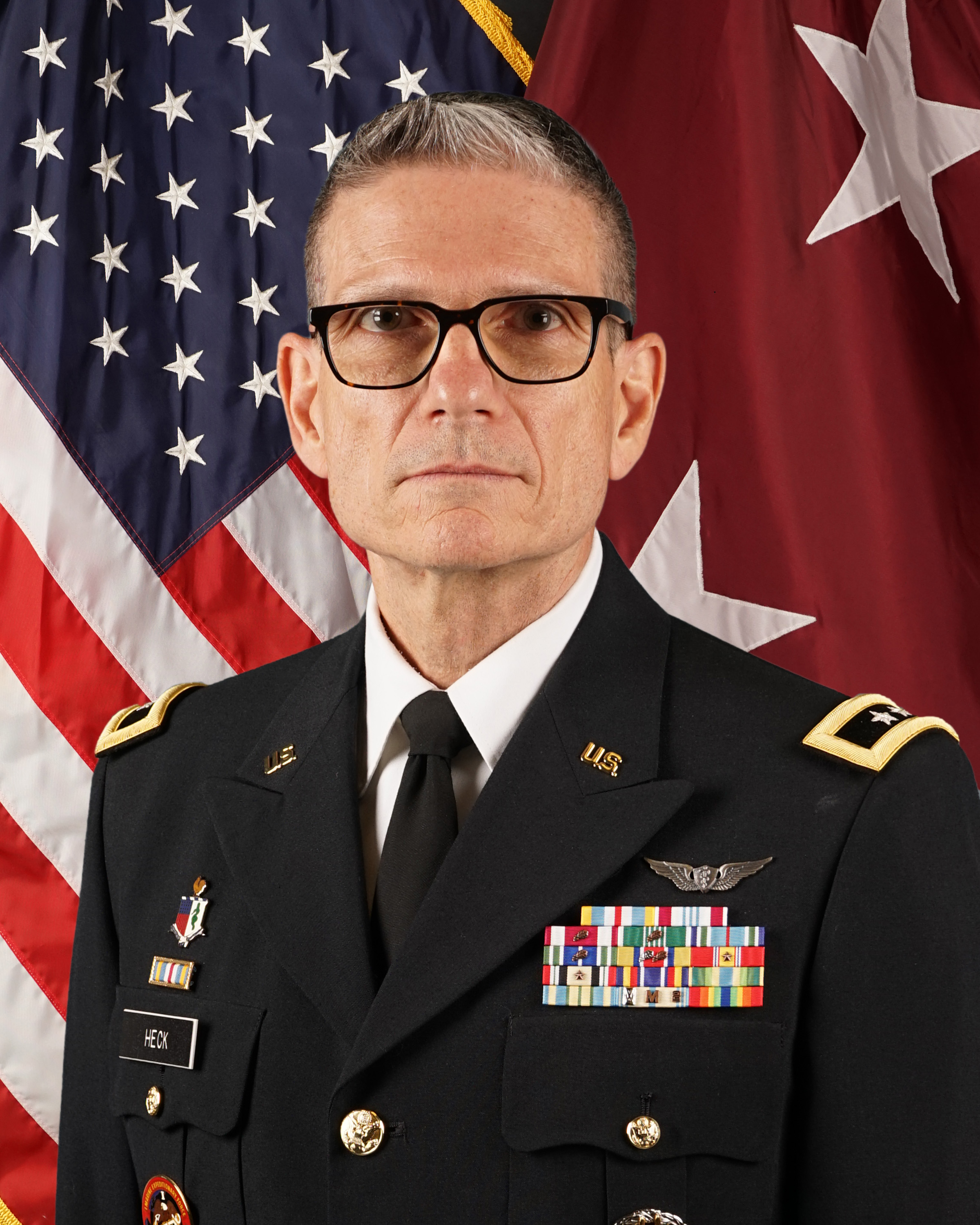
- Official portrait, 2021

Member of the U.S. House of Representatives from Nevada's 3rd district
- In office January 3, 2011 – January 3, 2017
- Preceded by: Dina Titus
- Succeeded by: Jacky Rosen

Member of the Nevada Senate from the 5th district
- In office November 2, 2004 – November 4, 2008
- Preceded by: Ann O'Connell
- Succeeded by: Shirley Breeden

Personal details
- Born: Joseph John Heck; October 30, 1961 (age 64) New York City, New York, U.S.
- Party: Republican
- Spouse: Lisa Mattiello (m. 1995)
- Children: 3
- Education: Pennsylvania State University, University Park (BS); Philadelphia College of Osteopathic Medicine (DO); United States Army War College (MS)

Military service
- Branch/service: United States Army
- Years of service: 1991–2024
- Rank: Major General
- Unit: 325th Combat Support Hospital
- Battles/wars: Operation Joint Endeavor; Operation Noble Eagle; Iraq War

Joseph John Heck (born October 30, 1961) is an American politician, physician, and retired United States Army Major general who served as the United States representative for Nevada's 3rd congressional district from 2011 to 2017. Heck is a board-certified physician who previously served as a Nevada state senator from 2004 to 2008. He ran for the United States Senate in 2016, losing to Catherine Cortez Masto.

== Early life, education, and military service ==
Heck was born in Jamaica, Queens, a neighborhood of New York City, and was raised in Pennsylvania, where he graduated from Wallenpaupack Area High School in 1979. He graduated from the Pennsylvania State University in 1984 with a degree in health education. He is a member of the Beta Theta Pi fraternity. He received his Doctor of Osteopathic Medicine in 1988 from the Philadelphia College of Osteopathic Medicine and obtained a residency in emergency medicine in 1992 at the Albert Einstein Medical Center. In 1992, he moved to Clark County, Nevada. He earned a Master of Strategic Studies degree from the U.S. Army War College in 2006.

Heck served in the United States Army Reserve since 1991 and was promoted to brigadier general in 2014. He commanded a Medical Readiness Support Group overseeing more than 2,000 soldiers in six western states, and continued to serve in that capacity while in Congress. He served in Operation Joint Endeavor, Operation Noble Eagle, and Operation Iraqi Freedom. His last deployment was in January 2008 when he commanded an emergency room in a combat hospital outside Baghdad. He was promoted to the rank of major general in a ceremony at Fort Douglas, Utah, November 7, 2020. He retired from the Army Reserve in February 2024.

== Medical career ==
Heck was the president, owner, and medical director of Specialized Medical Operations until 2011. The company provided medical training, consulting, and operational support to law enforcement agencies, EMS, and military special operations. Heck has lectured and is published on special operations medical support, the medical response to acts of terrorism, and emergency preparedness and response.

From 1998 to 2003, Heck served as the medical director of the Casualty Care Research Center of the Uniformed Services University of the Health Sciences in Bethesda, Maryland, where he provided medical support for several federal law enforcement agencies and oversight for the medical response to acts of terrorism. Heck started his medical career as a volunteer firefighter and ambulance attendant in rural Pennsylvania. He volunteered as a medical team manager with the Nevada Urban Search & Rescue Team – Task Force 1 and as a member of the Las Vegas Metropolitan Police Department Search & Rescue team. He served as a tactical physician with the LVMPD SWAT team.

Heck served as a member of the Nevada State Homeland Security Commission Sub-committee on Health, the American Osteopathic Association's Task Force on Bioterrorism, and as the medical director for the Nevada Hospital Association's Hospital Preparedness program. He also served as the medical director for the Southern Nevada Health District's Office of Public Health Preparedness.

== Nevada Senate ==
Heck served one four-year term in the Nevada Senate, representing Clark County's 5th district.

=== Elections ===
Heck was first elected to the Nevada Senate to represent Clark County's 5th district in 2004, after defeating Senator Ann O'Connell in the Republican primary. Heck narrowly lost re-election in 2008 to Democrat Shirley Breeden by a margin of 47% to 46% and a plurality of 765 votes. Libertarian T. Rex Hagan received 4,754 votes (8%).

=== Committee assignments ===
He served on the Natural Resources, Human Resources and Education, the Commerce and Labor Committees. He was also the vice-chair of the Transportation and Homeland Security Committee.

== U.S. House of Representatives ==
=== Elections ===
==== 2010 ====
Although Heck had earlier announced he would challenge incumbent Republican Jim Gibbons for governor, he decided against it in favor of a run for Nevada's 3rd congressional district. He defeated incumbent Democratic U.S. Congresswoman Dina Titus, 48% to 47%, a difference of 1,748 votes. Titus only held the position for one term after she defeated incumbent Republican Jon C. Porter in 2008.

==== 2012 ====
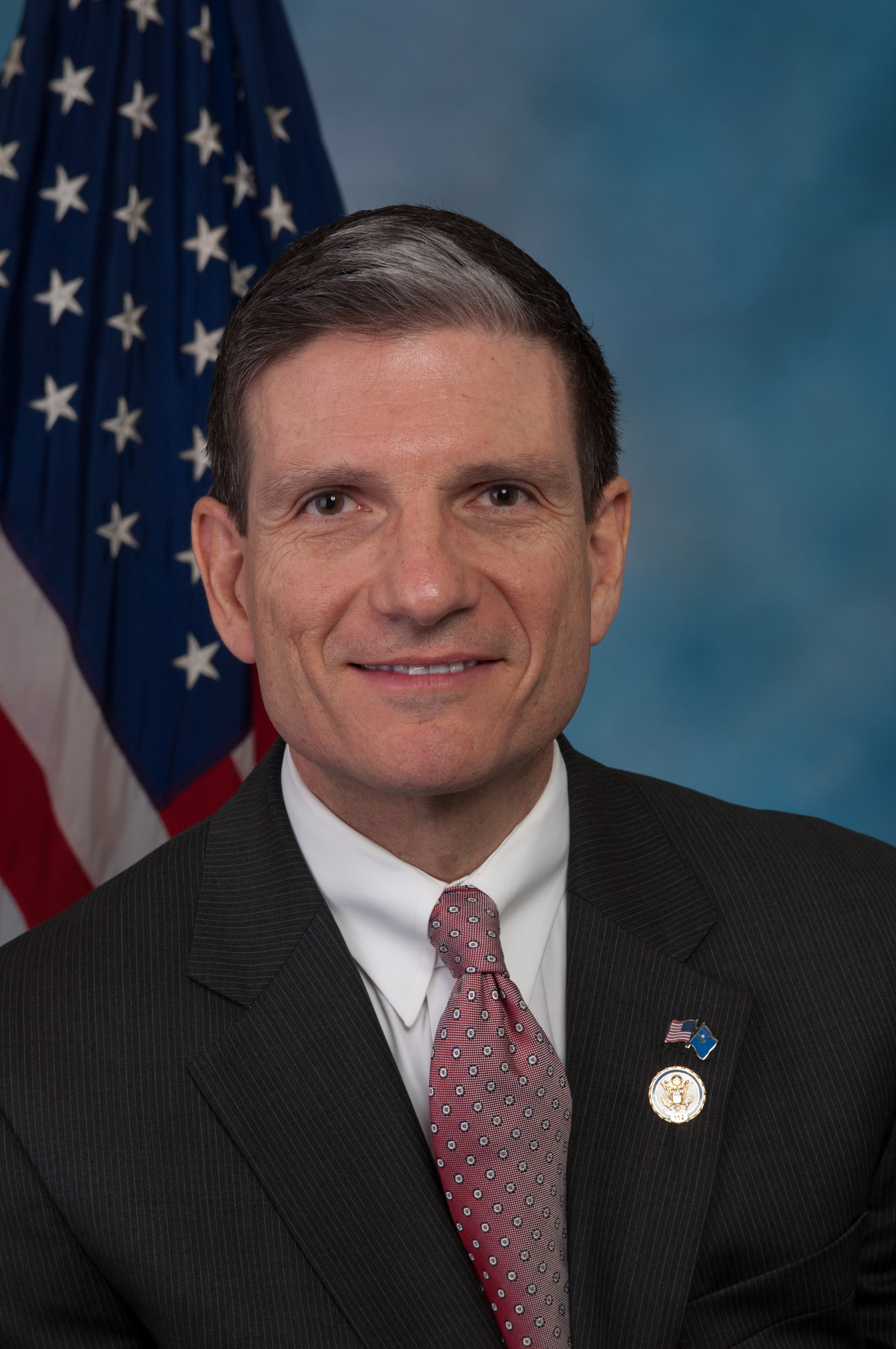
Heck as a member of the House of Representatives

After redistricting, Heck decided to run in the newly redrawn 3rd district, which Obama won in 2008 with 54% of the vote. On November 6, he defeated Speaker of the Nevada Assembly John Oceguera 50% to 43%.

==== 2014 ====
Heck won reelection easily, beating Democrat Erin Bilbray by a margin of 61% to 36%.

=== Tenure ===
Heck was one of three freshmen named to the House Republican Steering Committee in the 112th Congress. He was re-elected to the Republican Steering Committee in both 2012 and 2014. Heck was ranked as the 74th most bipartisan member of the U.S. House of Representatives during the 114th United States Congress (and the most bipartisan member of the U.S. House of Representatives from Nevada) in the Bipartisan Index created by The Lugar Center and the McCourt School of Public Policy that ranks members of the United States Congress by their degree of bipartisanship (by measuring the frequency each member's bills attract co-sponsors from the opposite party and each member's co-sponsorship of bills by members of the opposite party).

==== Energy and environmental policy ====
In 2010, he signed the Americans for Prosperity's No Climate Tax pledge. He supports an "all of the above" energy policy which includes natural gas, domestic oil production, and alternative energy sources such as wind, solar, hydropower, geothermal and nuclear.

In 2011, as a representative, Heck voted to prevent the EPA from regulating greenhouse gases.

In 2012, when asked about climate change and regulating carbon dioxide, he stated: "When you start looking at trying to regulate something like carbon dioxide, which is a natural, biological process, you start running into areas of confusion" and "I think certainly over the millennia, we've seen changes in our climate both ways, and I think throughout the future millennia we will continue to see climate change that goes both ways. But the issue for this election is not what's going to be happening in the next 200 years, it's going to be what's happening in the next 12 months."

He is in favor of the Keystone XL Pipeline.

Heck voted to ease the exploration and extraction of minerals and energy resources from Native American lands, and restrict the ability of non-resident tribal members to vote on these issues.

==== Economic policy ====
Heck supports an audit of the Federal Reserve and a balanced budget amendment to the Constitution. Heck voted against increasing the debt limit in 2011, stating "Raising the debt ceiling without significant spending cuts will only prolong the uncertainty preventing an economic recovery".

In 2011, Heck called Social Security a "pyramid scheme". The remark aroused a political controversy in Nevada, and Heck clarified that he meant to refer to it as an "inverted pyramid". He has suggested that today's young people may need to retire later to keep the program fiscally viable.

In 2015, Heck voted to eliminate the estate tax. In 2010, he signed the Taxpayer Protection Pledge by Americans for Tax Reform. He has been critical of Governor Brian Sandoval's Commerce Tax. He is opposed to raising the federal minimum wage in favor of leaving the decision to local governments.

==== Education policy ====
Heck supports the use of education vouchers for use in private or public schools. He voted for a budget bill which called for a 10-year freeze to the maximum Pell Grant award to college students. He favors expanding refinancing options for student loans, enhancing income-based repayment plans, and providing loan forgiveness for civil service.

==== Foreign policy and veterans affairs ====
In 2011, Heck voted for the National Defense Authorization Act for Fiscal Year 2012. In 2011, Heck voted not to withdraw American troops from the war in Afghanistan.

Heck opposed United States involvement in Libya, saying, "We are already engaged in military operations on two fronts, and Libya opened a third. We cannot afford the troops or taxpayer dollars—especially without a national security objective."

Heck opposes the Iran nuclear deal framework, calling it unenforceable, and has voted to censure and block President Obama's nuclear treaty with Iran.

Heck has voted for the Patriot Act and has endorsed the indefinite military incarceration of alleged terrorists. He voted to end the bulk collection of metadata from phone calls by the NSA.

In 2015, Heck cosponsored a bill with Democrat Tulsi Gabbard that would award a Congressional Gold Medal to Filipinos who fought in World War II, who now live in the Philippines and the United States.

Heck authored the Vulnerable Veterans Housing Reform Act which prevents disabled veterans who receive in-home care from the VA from having their housing benefits reduced. The bill became law in 2016.

==== Gun policy ====
Heck opposes most laws which restrict the sale of firearms. He is in favor of expanded and perhaps universal background checks.

Following the Isla Vista massacre, Heck co-sponsored an amendment to increase funding for criminal background checks. He voted against restricting gun sales to those on terror watch lists. He voted to prevent Washington D.C. from implementing many provisions of gun control.

==== Health policy ====
Heck was an original co-sponsor of the attempt to repeal the Patient Protection and Affordable Care Act. His stated priorities include protecting the patient-physician relationship, reducing health care costs, and working to protect Medicare for Nevada's seniors and preserving it for future generations; by training more physicians and increasing the use of health savings accounts.

==== Immigration policy ====
In August 2014, Heck broke ranks with the Republican Party and voted against a bill that would have dismantled the Deferred Action for Childhood Arrivals.

In 2015, he voted to more strenuously police immigration from Syria and Iraq.

==== Social policy ====
In 2011, he voted to prohibit federal funding of National Public Radio, and to support the continuing use of federal funds for NASCAR sponsorships.

In 2012, he voted to reauthorize the expiring Violence Against Women Act.

During his time in the House, Heck has voted in favor of prohibiting federal funding of abortion, and prohibiting the use of federal funds for health services at Planned Parenthood.

==== Campaign finance policy ====
Heck is opposed to the DISCLOSE Act, which would require funders of political ads to put their names on advertisements. He is a supporter of the Citizens United v. FEC U.S. Supreme Court decision.

=== Sponsored legislation ===
The following is a partial list of legislation that was directly sponsored by Heck.

- Three Kids Mine Remediation and Reclamation Act (H.R. 697; 113th Congress) – a bill that would authorize the sale of approximately 950 acres of federal land to the city of Henderson, Nevada. The land used to be a mine and now needs significant environmental remediation and reclamation.
- Vulnerable Veterans Housing Reform Act of 2013 (H.R. 1742; 113th Congress) – a bill that would change the way the United States Department of Housing and Urban Development (HUD) calculates a veterans' income to exclude some aid that some veterans receive from the United States Department of Veterans Affairs (VA). The bill would also change utility allowances.
- Good Samaritan Search and Recovery Act of 2013 (H.R. 2166; 113th Congress) – a bill that would require the federal government to issue the appropriate permits within 48 hours to volunteer search and rescue groups to allow them to search federal lands for missing persons.

=== Committee assignments ===
- Committee on Armed Services
  - Subcommittee on Military Personnel
  - United States House Armed Services Subcommittee on Oversight and Investigations (Chair)
- Committee on Education and the Workforce
  - Subcommittee on Higher Education and Workforce Training
  - Subcommittee on Health, Employment, Labor, and Pensions
- Permanent Select Committee on Intelligence
  - United States House Intelligence Subcommittee on Technical and Tactical Intelligence (Chair)

== 2016 U.S. Senate campaign ==
In July 2015, Heck announced that he would run for the U.S. Senate seat left open due to Harry Reid's retirement. The Republican and Democratic primaries, which were both contested, took place on June 14, 2016.

Heck easily defeated primary opponent Sharron Angle, who had narrowly lost to Harry Reid in 2010. Heck's campaign received millions of dollars of indirect support from the Koch brothers, according to the New York Times. The Kochs paid for ads on his behalf and for millions of dollars of ads against his rival, and whose organizations have 30 paid staff members working in Nevada. Heck was, in the 3rd quarter of 2016, the House member receiving the largest amount of political donations. His opponents, including organized labor and environmental groups, spent significant sums on advertising against him.

Heck supported Donald Trump's candidacy for president until the Donald Trump and Billy Bush recording controversy of October 2016. Heck then withdrew his support.

In a recording of Heck at a private event in October 2016, he said he believed Trump may hurt other Republicans' electoral bids. Prior to the election, he did not say whether or not he would vote for Trump.

Heck lost to Catherine Cortez Masto in the 2016 general election, held on November 8, 2016. He carried 16 of Nevada's 17 counties and county equivalents. However, he could not overcome an 82,000-vote deficit in Clark County.

== Personal life ==
Heck resides in Henderson, Nevada, with his wife, Lisa Heck (née Mattiello). They have three children. Lisa is a registered nurse. Heck is a Roman Catholic. He believes that employers have the right to deny health coverage for contraception if they have moral objections to it. He is active with the American Legion Paradise Post 149, the Knights of Columbus Council 13456, and Catholic War Veterans Post 1947. He is also a member of the ReFormers Caucus of Issue One.

== Electoral history ==
United States House of Representatives elections, 2010 3rd Congressional District of Nevada
Party	Candidate	Votes	%
Republican	Joe Heck	128,916	48
Democratic	Dina Titus (incumbent)	127,168	47
Independent	Barry Michaels	6,473	2
Libertarian	Joseph P. Silvestri	4,026	2
Independent American	Scott David Narter	1,291	<1
Total votes		267,874	100
Republican gain from Democratic			

United States House of Representatives elections, 2012 3rd Congressional District of Nevada
Party	Candidate	Votes	%
Republican	Joe Heck (Incumbent)	137,244	50
Democratic	John Oceguera	116,823	43
Independent American	Jim Murphy	12,856	5
Independent American	Tom Jones	5,600	2
Total votes		272,523	100
Republican hold			

Nevada United States Senate election, 2016
Republican primary
Party	Candidate	Votes	%
Republican	Joe Heck	74,517	65
Republican	Sharron Angle	26,142	23
Republican	None of these candidates	3,902	3
Republican	Thomas Heck	3,570	3
Republican	Eddie Hamilton	2,507	2
Republican	D'Nese Davis	1,937	2
Republican	Bill Tarbell	1,179	1
Republican	Robert Leeds	662	0.6
Republican	Justin Preble	582	0.5
Republican	Carlo Poliak	279	0.2
Total		114,827	100

Nevada United States Senate election, 2016
General election
Party	Candidate	Votes	%
Democratic	Catherine Cortez Masto	520,658	47
Republican	Joe Heck	494,427	45
Independent American	Tom Jones	17,104	2
Independent	Tom Sawyer	14,163	1
Independent	Tony Gumina	10,719	1
Socialist	Jarrod M. Williams	6,864	0.7
Total		1,108,294	100

== Awards and decorations ==
Heck has received the following awards:

	Defense Meritorious Service Medal
Width-44 myrtle green ribbon with width-3 white stripes at the edges and five width-1 stripes down the center; the central white stripes are width-2 apart	Army Commendation Medal with one bronze oak leaf cluster
	Joint Services Achievement Medal
Width-44 ribbon with two width-9 ultramarine blue stripes surrounded by two pairs of two width-4 green stripes; all these stripes are separated by width-2 white borders	Army Achievement Medal with one bronze oak leaf cluster
	Army Reserve Components Achievement Medal with four bronze oak leaf clusters
	Military Outstanding Volunteer Service Medal
	National Defense Service Medal with one Service star
	Iraq Campaign Medal
	Global War on Terrorism Service Medal
	Armed Forces Service Medal
	Armed Forces Reserve Medal
Width-44 ribbon with width-6 central ultramarine blue stripe, flanked by pairs of stripes that are respectively width-4 emerald, width-3 golden yellow, width-5 orange, and width-7 scarlet	Army Service Ribbon
	Army Flight Surgeon Badge
	Joint Meritorious Unit Award

== See also ==
- Physicians in the United States Congress

U.S. House of Representatives
Preceded by Dina Titus	Member of the U.S. House of Representatives from Nevada's 3rd congressional district 2011–2017	Succeeded by Jacky Rosen
Party political offices
Preceded by Sharron Angle	Republican nominee for U.S. Senator from Nevada (Class 3); 2016	Succeeded by Adam Laxalt
U.S. order of precedence (ceremonial)
Preceded by Jon Porter as Former U.S. Representative	Order of precedence of the United States as Former U.S. Representative	Succeeded by Tom Osborne as Former U.S. Representative
