= Glen Leavitt =

American politician

Member of the Nevada Assembly from the 23rd district
- In office November 7, 2018 – November 9, 2022
- Preceded by: Melissa Woodbury
- Succeeded by: Danielle Gallant

Personal details
- Born: Glen Kaimi Leavitt; 1973 (age 52–53) St. George, Utah, U.S.
- Party: Republican
- Spouse: Divorced
- Education: Brigham Young University (BA); University of Nevada, Las Vegas (MA)
- Website: Leavitt 4 Nevada

Glen Kaimi Leavitt (born 1973) is an American politician who served as a member of the Nevada Assembly from the 23rd district.

== Early life and education ==
Leavitt was born in 1973 in St. George, Utah. Leavitt moved from Las Vegas to Boulder City, Nevada when he was ten years old. He is of Asian descent.

Leavitt graduated from Boulder City High School in 1992. Leavitt earned a B.A. in political science from Brigham Young University and an M.A. in public administration from the University of Nevada, Las Vegas.

== Career ==
Leavitt served on the Boulder City planning commission from 2015 to 2017. Leavitt resigned from this position to run for the Nevada Assembly. His campaign was endorsed by the incumbent assemblywoman at the time, Melissa Woodbury. In 2018, Leavitt was elected to the Nevada Assembly, where he represented the 23rd district between 2018-2022.

== Personal life ==
Glen Leavitt is married to Rebecca Woodbury-Leavitt. They have three children. The Woodbury family is prominent in Nevada politics, including Leavitt's father-in-law, former Clark County Commissioner Bruce Woodbury; his brother-in-law, former Boulder City Mayor Rod Woodbury; his great-uncle-in-law, former Speaker of the Nevada Assembly Jack Higgins; and his sister-in-law, Melissa Woodbury.

== Elections ==
- 2020 Leavitt was unopposed in the Republican primary. In the general election, he defeated Democratic candidate Brent Foutz and Independent American Party candidate Bill Hoge with 30, 418 votes (63.41%).
- 2018 Leavitt won the Republican primary with 3,466 votes (55.1%) against Matt McCarthy. He defeated IAP candidate Ralph Preta in the general election with 24,100 votes (71.42%).
