= Merle A. Berman =

American politician (born 1946)

Member of the Nevada Assembly
- In office 1997–2001

Member of the Nevada Commission on Ethics

Personal details
- Born: 1946 (age 79–80) Philadelphia, Pennsylvania
- Party: Republican

Merle A. Berman (born 1946) is a former member of the Nevada Legislature. A member of the Republican Party, she was initially elected in 1996, and represented District 2 in the Nevada Assembly from 1997 to 2001. Upon completion of her Assembly term, she was appointed to the Nevada Commission on Ethics.

== Formative years and family ==
Born in Philadelphia, Pennsylvania in 1946, Berman earned a Bachelor of Science degree from Pennsylvania State University.

She has worked in real estate and development.

She has one son, Ryan Hoffman. Her sister, Constance E. (Berman) Brooks, died from cancer in Pennsylvania on August 24, 1997.

== Political career ==
A member of the Republican Party, Berman represented District 2 in the Nevada Assembly, and was initially elected to her seat in 1996. She served in three regular sessions.

In 1999, she was a member of the following Assembly committees: Commerce and Labor, Government Affairs, and Health and Human Services.

On February 14 and April 12, 2001, she participated in the Field Hearing Before the Committee on Environment and Public Works, which was held by the U.S. Senate in Fallon, Nevada to investigate childhood leukemia clusters in that community. According to the minutes of that hearing, Berman pressed for answers to ascertain why certain individuals, but not others were selected for the panel of experts chosen to investigate the leukemia clusters and “why the Federal Government was not involved in the testing.” And on April 12, 2001:

“Berman cited an upcoming bill dealing with the comprehensive cancer plan in Nevada. She specifically inquired whether her bill should be amended to address the need for expeditious identification and response to cancer clusters. [Dr. Randall Todd, state epidemiologist, Nevada State Health Division] replied that this would require additional thought and that his written response would follow after consultation with his colleagues.”

Berman also succeeded in obtaining this testimony from one of the medical experts in attendance:

“[Dr. Thomas Sinks, the associate director for science at the National Center for Environmental Health at the Centers for Disease Control] clarified that nobody ever developed cancer because of chances. There was always a cause, and the challenge in Fallon would be to discover the common denominator among the 11 children. The unifying cause was not yet known, but eventually science would identify the commonality. The probability of the Fallon cluster being a chance event was described by Dr. Sinks as being unlikely.”

Berman then spoke on a different matter at a Nevada Legislature meeting later that same month. Stating that a number of groups claiming to be charitable organizations were misleading potential donors because they were actually for-profit businesses engaged in the exploitation of young children, she urged members of the Nevada Senate to support passage of Assembly Bill 74 during an April 25, 2001 meeting of the Nevada Senate Committee on Labor and Commerce. The proposed bill was designed to prohibit the employment of children under the age of sixteen in door-to-door sales of magazines, candy, and other products. As the debate continued, Berman noted that section 2, subsection 2, paragraph (d) of the proposed legislation would exempt farm workers from restrictions imposed by A.B. 74.

In 2003, she served on the Nevada Assembly’s Legislative Committee on Health Care, as well as on the non-legislative Advisory Council for Community Notification. Upon completion of her Assembly term, she was appointed to the Nevada Commission on Ethics.

In 2005, she announced that she would run for the office of secretary of state in Nevada in the 2006 election.

== Public service activities ==
Berman has also been involved with the following civic or social organizations:

- Active Republican Women’s Club of Las Vegas/National Federation
- American Legislative Exchange Council
- National Foundation for Women Legislators, Inc.
- Nevada Dance Theatre, board of directors
- Nevada Housing and Neighborhood Development (HAND)
- Women’s Development Center, advisory board
