= Sandra Tiffany =

American politician

Member of the Nevada Senate from Clark County's 5th district
- In office November 6, 2002 – November 8, 2006
- Preceded by: Bill O'Donnell
- Succeeded by: Joyce Woodhouse

Member of the Nevada Assembly from the 21st district
- In office November 4, 1992 – November 6, 2002
- Succeeded by: Walter Andonov

Personal details
- Born: June 30, 1949 (age 77) Spokane, Washington
- Party: Republican

Sandra Tiffany (born June 30, 1949) is an American politician who served in the Nevada Assembly from the 21st district from 1992 to 2002 and in the Nevada Senate from Clark County's 5th district from 2002 to 2006.
