= Jason Frierson =

American politician and lawyer (born 1970)

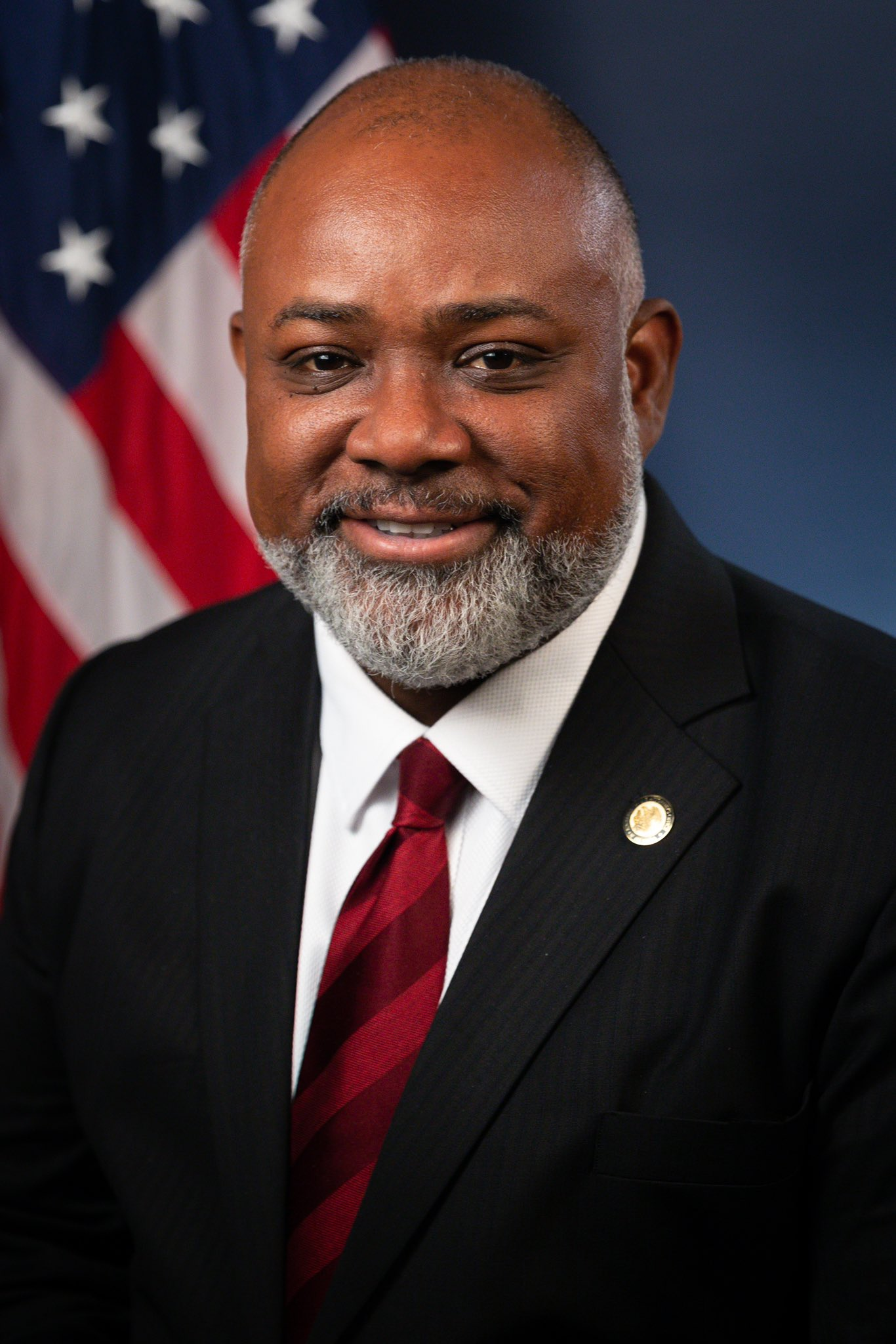

United States Attorney for the District of Nevada
- In office May 11, 2022 – January 17, 2025
- Appointed by: Joe Biden
- Preceded by: Christopher Chiou (acting)
- Succeeded by: Sue Fahami (acting); Sigal Chattah (interim)

Speaker of the Nevada Assembly
- In office February 6, 2017 – April 28, 2022
- Preceded by: John Hambrick
- Succeeded by: Steve Yeager

Member of the Nevada Assembly from the 8th district 26th district (2011–2013)
- In office November 9, 2016 – April 28, 2022
- Preceded by: John Moore
- Succeeded by: Duy Nguyen
- In office February 7, 2011 – February 2015
- Preceded by: Barbara Buckley
- Succeeded by: John Moore

Personal details
- Born: 1970 (age 55–56) Los Angeles, California, U.S.
- Party: Democratic
- Education: University of Nevada, Reno (BS); University of Nevada, Las Vegas (JD)
- Website: Official website

Jason Frierson (born 1970) is an American lawyer and politician from Nevada who served as the United States attorney for the District of Nevada from 2022 until 2025. He was a member of the Nevada Assembly from 2011 to 2014 and again from 2016 to 2022 and serving as speaker 2017 to 2022.

== Early life and education ==
Frierson was born in 1970 in Los Angeles, California. He earned a Bachelor of Science from the University of Nevada, Reno in 1996 and a Juris Doctor from the William S. Boyd School of Law of the University of Nevada, Las Vegas in 2001.

== Career ==
Frierson, a Democrat, was a member of the Nevada Assembly from February 7, 2011 to 2014, when he was defeated by John Moore by 40 votes.

He returned to the Assembly in the 2016 election, defeating Republican Norm Ross, and incumbent Republican-turned-Libertarian incumbent John Moore with 56% of the votes. He was speaker of the Assembly 2017-2022, and was a member of the National Black Caucus of State Legislators.

=== Elections ===
In 2010, Democratic assemblywoman Barbara Buckley retired from the Assembly because she was term limited and left the District 26 seat open. Frierson won the three-way June 8, 2010, Democratic primary with 586 votes (48.83%), and won the three-way November 2, 2010, general election with 3,853 votes (58.31%) against Republican nominee Joe Egan and Independent American candidate Stacey Gonzales.

In 2012, Frierson won the June 12 Democratic primary with 761 votes (67.58%), and won the November 6 general election with 11,550 votes (61.00%) against Republican nominee Arthur Martinez.

In 2014, Frierson was defeated by John Moore by 40 votes. He won 49.76% of the votes, while Moore won 50.24%.

In 2016, Frierson won back the 8th District seat with 56% of the vote.

=== U.S. attorney for the District of Nevada ===
On November 12, 2021, President Joe Biden announced his intent to nominate Frierson to serve as the United States attorney for the District of Nevada. On November 15, 2021, his nomination was sent to the United States Senate.

On January 13, 2022, his nomination was reported out of the Senate Judiciary Committee. On April 27, 2022, his nomination was confirmed in the Senate by voice vote. He was sworn into office on May 11, 2022.

On January 17, 2025, he resigned.

== See also ==
- List of Nevada state legislatures

Political offices
Preceded by John Hambrick	Speaker of the Nevada Assembly; 2017–2022	Succeeded by Steve Yeager
Legal offices
Preceded by Christopher Chiou; Acting	United States Attorney for the District of Nevada; 2022–present	Incumbent
