= Lynn Hettrick =

American politician

Member of the Nevada General Assembly for the 39th district
- In office November 1992 – November 2006

Personal details
- Born: March 13, 1944 (age 82) Carmel, California, United States
- Party: Republican
- Spouse: Arla Stebner
- Children: four
- Profession: investment manager

Lynn Clark Hettrick (born March 13, 1944) was an American politician who was a Republican member of the Nevada General Assembly. During his tenure, he was the Assembly Minority Leader for the 1997, 1999, 2001, 2003, 2003 Special Sessions (two), 2004 Special Session, 2005, and 2005 Special Sessions. He was an investment manager by profession.
