= List of Nevada state legislatures =

The legislature of the U.S. state of Nevada has convened many times since statehood became effective on October 31, 1864. It continues to operate under the amended Constitution of Nevada of 1864.

== Territorial legislatures ==
Name	Start date	End date	Last election
1st Nevada Territorial Legislature	October 1, 1861	November 2, 1861	
2nd Nevada Territorial Legislature	November 11, 1862	December 18, 1862	
3rd Nevada Territorial Legislature	January 12, 1864	February 20, 1864	

== State legislatures ==
Name	Start date	End date	Last election
1st Nevada Legislature	1864		
2nd Nevada Legislature	1866		
3rd Nevada Legislature	January 1867		November 1866
4th Nevada Legislature	1869		November 1868
5th Nevada Legislature	1871		November 1870
6th Nevada Legislature	1873		November 1872
7th Nevada Legislature	1875		November 1874
8th Nevada Legislature	1877		November 1876
9th Nevada Legislature	1879		November 1878
10th Nevada Legislature	1881		November 1880
11th Nevada Legislature	1883		November 7, 1882
12th Nevada Legislature	1885		November 1884
13th Nevada Legislature	1887		November 1886
14th Nevada Legislature	1889		November 1888
15th Nevada Legislature	1891		November 1890
16th Nevada Legislature	1893		November 1892
17th Nevada Legislature	1895		November 1894
18th Nevada Legislature	1897		November 1896
19th Nevada Legislature	1899		November 1898
20th Nevada Legislature	1901		November 1900
21st Nevada Legislature	1903		November 1902
22nd Nevada Legislature	1905		November 1904
23rd Nevada Legislature	1907		November 1906
24th Nevada Legislature	1909		November 1908
25th Nevada Legislature	1911		November 1910
26th Nevada Legislature	1913		November 1912
27th Nevada Legislature	1915		November 1914
28th Nevada Legislature	1917		November 1916
29th Nevada Legislature	1919		November 1918
30th Nevada Legislature	1921		November 1920
31st Nevada Legislature	1923		November 1922
32nd Nevada Legislature	1925		November 1924
33rd Nevada Legislature	1927		November 1926
34th Nevada Legislature	1929		November 1928
35th Nevada Legislature	1931		November 1930
36th Nevada Legislature	1933		November 1932
37th Nevada Legislature	1935		November 1934
38th Nevada Legislature	1937		November 1936
39th Nevada Legislature	1939		November 1938
40th Nevada Legislature	1941		
41st Nevada Legislature	1942		
42nd Nevada Legislature	1944		
43rd Nevada Legislature	1947		November 1946
44th Nevada Legislature	1949		November 1948
45th Nevada Legislature	1951		November 1950
46th Nevada Legislature	1953		November 1952
47th Nevada Legislature	1955		November 1954
48th Nevada Legislature	1957		November 1956
49th Nevada Legislature	1959		November 1958
50th Nevada Legislature	1960		
51st Nevada Legislature	1961		
52nd Nevada Legislature	1963		November 1962
53rd Nevada Legislature	1965		November 1964
54th Nevada Legislature	1967		November 1966
55th Nevada Legislature	1969		November 1968
56th Nevada Legislature	1971		November 1970
57th Nevada Legislature	1973		November 1972
58th Nevada Legislature	1975		November 1974
59th Nevada Legislature	1977		November 1976
60th Nevada Legislature	1979		November 1978
61st Nevada Legislature	1981		November 4, 1980
62nd Nevada Legislature	1983		November 1982
63rd Nevada Legislature	1985		November 1984
64th Nevada Legislature	1987		November 1986
65th Nevada Legislature	1989		November 1988
66th Nevada Legislature	1991		November 1990
67th Nevada Legislature	1993		November 1992
68th Nevada Legislature	1995		November 1994
69th Nevada Legislature	1997		November 1996
70th Nevada Legislature	1999		November 1998
71st Nevada Legislature	2001		November 2000
72nd Nevada Legislature	2003		November 2002
73rd Nevada Legislature	2005		November 2004
74th Nevada Legislature	2007		November 2006
75th Nevada Legislature	2009		November 2008
76th Nevada Legislature	2011		November 2010
77th Nevada Legislature	2013		November 2012
78th Nevada Legislature	2015		November 2014: Senate
79th Nevada Legislature	2017		November 2016: Senate
80th Nevada Legislature	2019		November 2018: Senate
81st Nevada Legislature	2021		November 2020: House, Senate
82nd Nevada Legislature	February 6, 2023	June 6, 2023	November 2022: House, Senate
83rd Nevada Legislature	February 3, 2025		November 5, 2024: House, Senate

== See also ==
- List of speakers of the Nevada Assembly
- List of governors of Nevada
- Political party strength in Nevada
- Politics of Nevada
- Elections in Nevada
- Nevada State Capitol
- Historical outline of Nevada
- Lists of United States state legislative sessions
