= Libertarian Party of Nevada =

State affiliate of the Libertarian Party

- Chairperson: Charles Melchin
- Founded: 1971; 55 years ago
- Headquarters: P.O. Box #70974 Las Vegas, Nevada 89170
- Membership (2021): 17,554
- Ideology: Libertarianism Non-interventionism; Fiscal conservatism Economic liberalism Cultural liberalism Laissez-faire
- National affiliation: Libertarian Party
- Colors: Gold-yellow
- Nevada Senate: 0 / 21
- Nevada House of Representatives: 0 / 42
- U.S. Senate (Nevada): 0 / 2
- U.S. House of Representatives (Nevada): 0 / 4
- Other elected officials: 0 (June 2024)

Website
- www.LPNevada.org

The Libertarian Party of Nevada (LPN) is the affiliate of the Libertarian Party in the state of Nevada. It is headed by State Chair Charles Melchin.

== History ==
The Libertarian Party of Nevada is the third largest political party in the State of Nevada. It has existed since the founding of the Libertarian Party of the United States in 1971. It is considered a minor political party by the State of Nevada and has been since 1972. This status indicates that the LPN has ballot access, but no primary voting. Instead, it holds its own primary election during its State Conventions.

The Libertarian Party of Nevada has continued to grow in both influence and voter registration since its inception. This is largely due to the big-government ideologies of the Democratic and Republican parties; voters with libertarian ideologies began to look elsewhere.

Assemblyman John Moore of the 8th District switched party affiliation from the Republican Party to the Libertarian Party on January 8, 2016, giving the Libertarian Party their first Assembly seat in Nevada history. Moore went on to lose his re-election bid on November 8, 2016, after the state Libertarian Party censured him for votes cast during a special session of the Nevada Legislature.

== Party platform ==
The current platform for the party was ratified in May 2015 at the convention. The platform includes a variety of topics where civil liberties have been restricted or there has been an overreach by the government. These topics include: Marriage equality, reductions in alcohol regulation (including lowering the drinking age to 18), increasing jobs through encouraging competition, lowering taxes and fees on businesses, abolishing the minimum wage, increasing competition in education, returning federal lands to the State of Nevada and the people, ending eminent domain abuse, adding Constitutional Carry to the Nevada Constitution, promoting open-borders policies, and ending the war on drugs.

== Current Libertarian office-holders and committee members ==
The Libertarian Party of Nevada holds none of the state's six statewide offices, and no seats in the Nevada Senate or Nevada Assembly. Libertarians hold none of the state's U.S. Senate seats and none of the state's four U.S. House of Representatives seats.

Executive Committee

- Chair: George Stamper
- Vice-chair: Adam Haman
- Treasurer: Brenda Barozzi
- Secretary: Travis McGlothin
- Northern Regional Representative: Brad Carpenter
- Southern Regional Representative: Tighe Galvin
- At-Large Representative: Lynette Warren
- Youth Director: Keval Patel

Nevada Libertarian National Committee Members

- Timothy Hagan – LNC Treasurer

== See also ==
- List of state parties of the Libertarian Party (United States)
