= Nevada's 6th Senate district =

American legislative district

Coordinates: 36.21°N 115.28°W

Nevada's 6th State Senate district
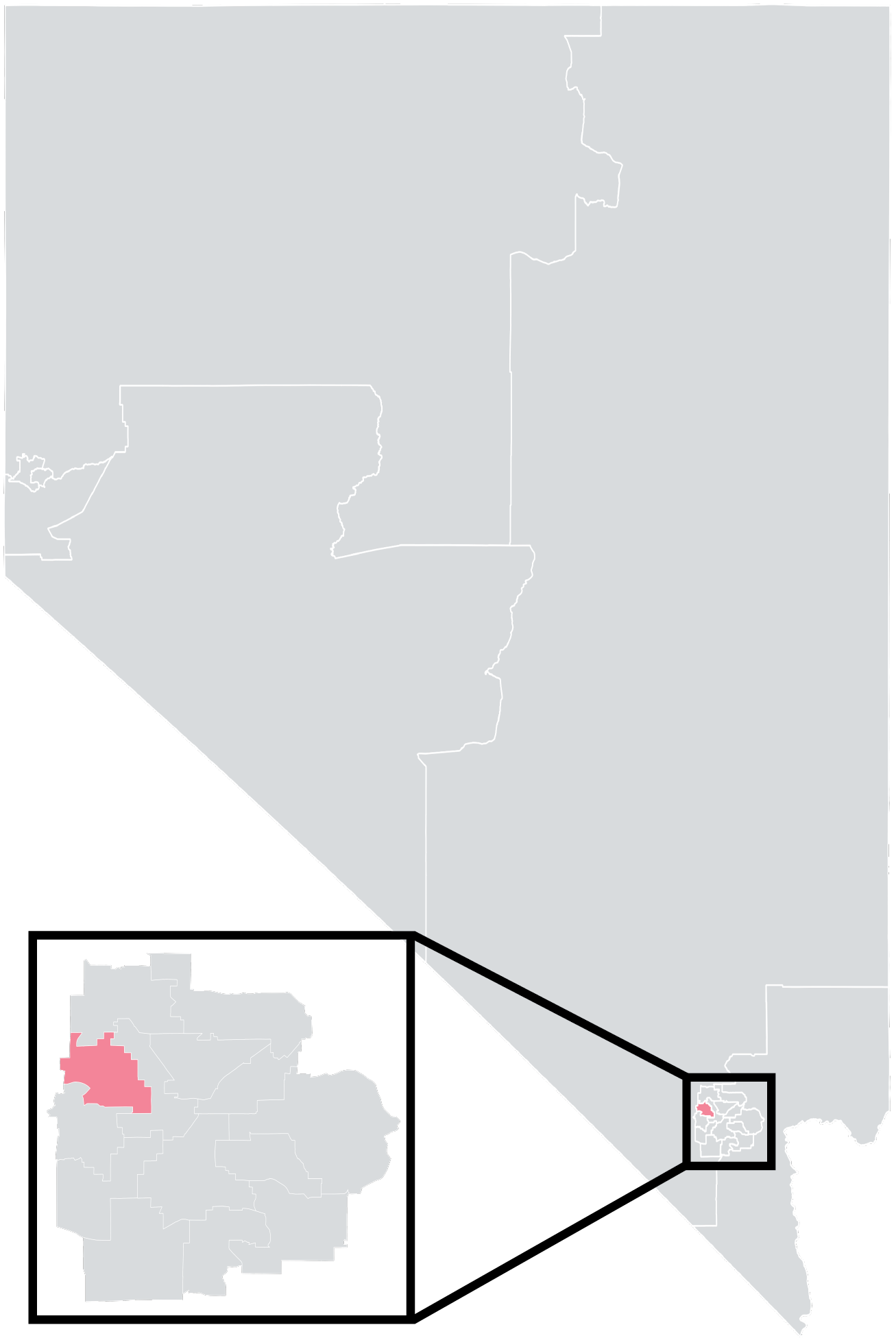
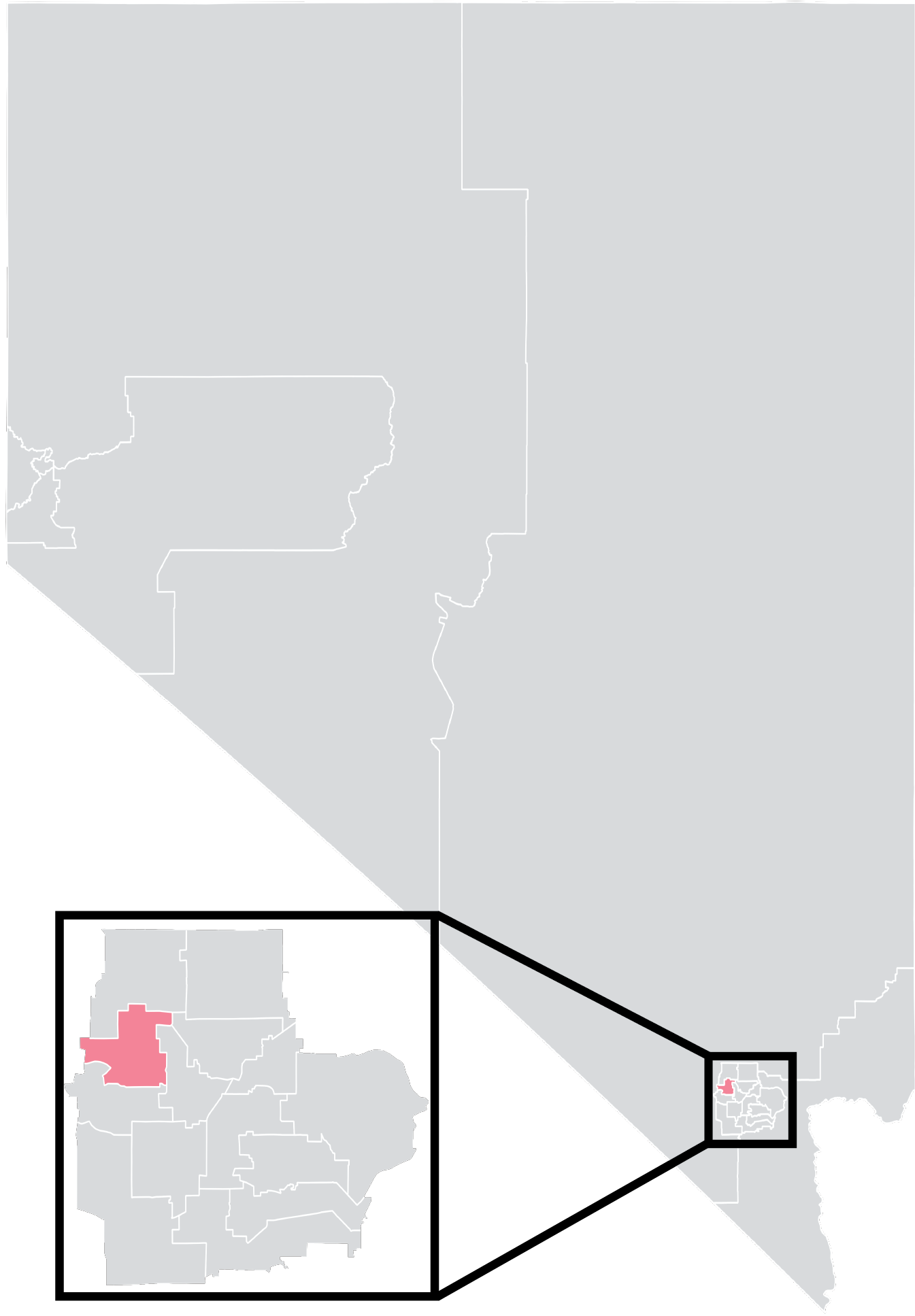
Senator
| Nicole Cannizzaro; D–Las Vegas |
- Registration: 43.0% Democratic; 36.0% Republican; 15.9% No party preference
- Demographics: 55% White; 9% Black; 23% Hispanic; 7% Asian; 4% Other
- Population (2018): 135,358
- Registered voters: 76,110

Nevada's 6th Senate district is one of 21 districts in the Nevada Senate. It has been represented by Democrat Nicole Cannizzaro, the current Senate Majority Leader, since 2016.

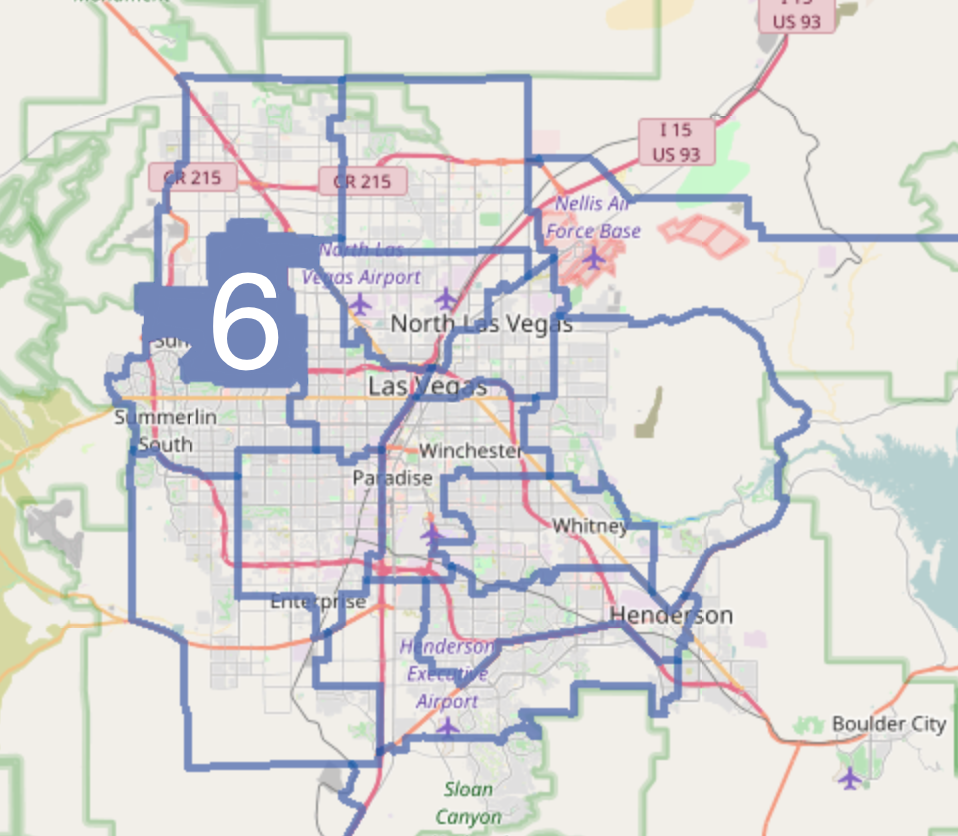
Closeup on the Las Vegas Valley with District 6 colored blue

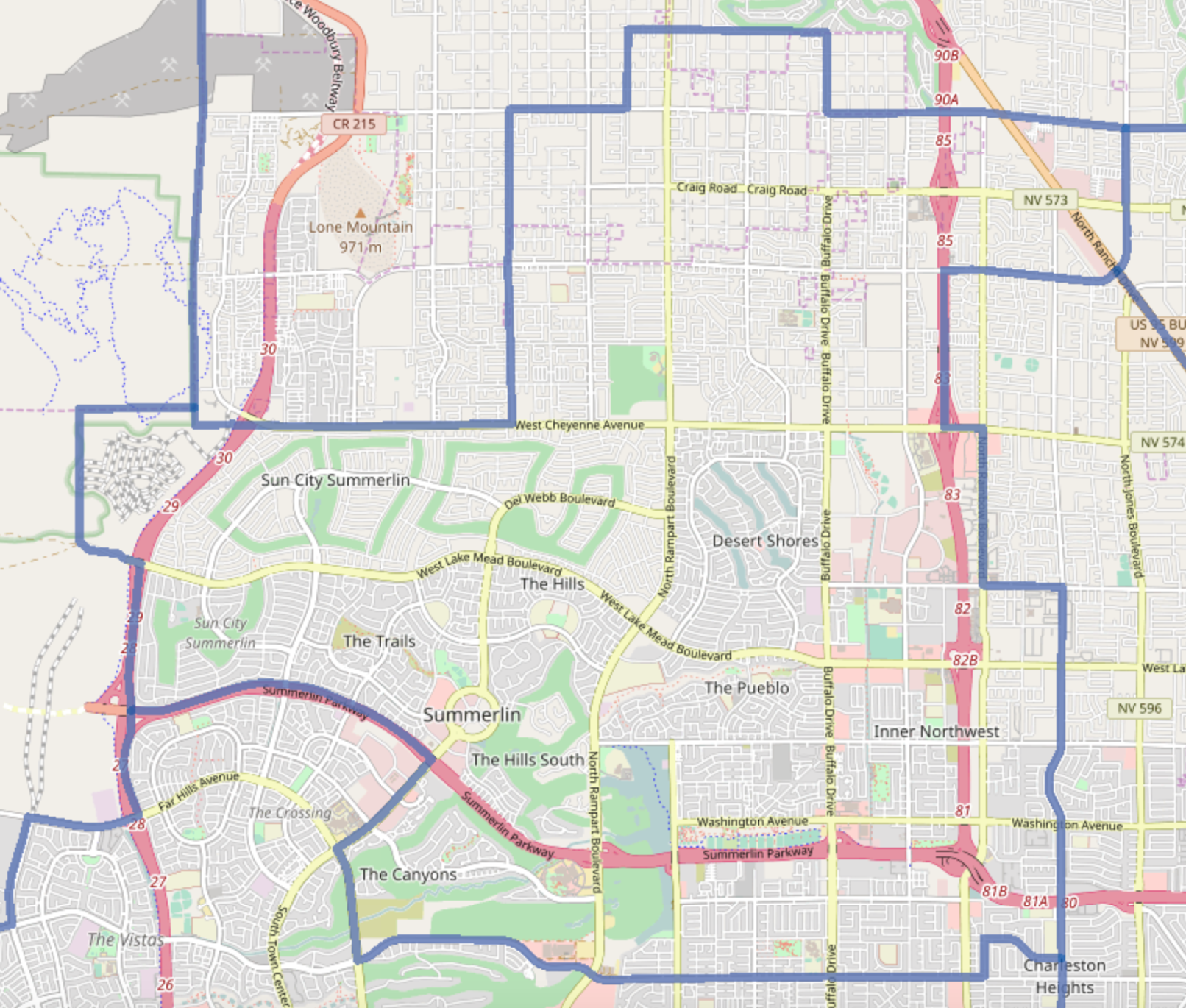
Closeup map of District 6

== Geography and demographics ==
District 6 is located in the Las Vegas Valley in Clark County, including parts of Summerlin and Las Vegas proper.

The district overlaps with Nevada's 1st, 3rd, and 4th congressional districts, and with the 34th and 37th districts of the Nevada Assembly. It has a surface area of 25.9 square miles (67 km^{2}), and a perimeter of 28.4 miles (45.7 km).

According to the 2010 census, District 6 had a population of 128,587 – 0.01% below the ideal. The district's Latino population is relatively low compared to the rest of Nevada. Nearly a quarter of the inhabitants of District 6 are 60 years old or older, which is 6% more than the Nevada average. Furthermore, the district's population is better-educated than the rest of Nevada; for example, just under 10% of its residents have no high school diploma, compared to over 15% in Nevada. The median household income is a few thousand dollars above the median of the entire state, and the poverty rate is 11%.

== Recent election results ==
Nevada Senators are elected to staggered four-year terms; since 2012 redistricting, the 6th district has held elections in presidential years.

=== 2024 ===
2024 Nevada State Senate election, District 6
| Party | Candidate | Votes | % |
|---|---|---|---|
| Democratic | Nicole Cannizzaro (incumbent) | 37,171 | 51.69 |
| Republican | Jill Douglass | 32,730 | 45.51 |
| Independent American | Brad Lee Barnhill | 2,017 | 2.80 |
| Total votes | | 71,918 | 100 |
| Democratic hold | | | |

=== 2020 ===
2020 Nevada State Senate election, District 6
| Party | Candidate | Votes | % | ±% |
|---|---|---|---|---|
| Democratic | Nicole Cannizzaro (incumbent) | 33,895 | 50.5 | |
| Republican | April Becker | 33,264 | 49.5 | |
| Total votes | | 67,159 | 100.0 | |
| Democratic hold | | Swing | | |

=== 2016 ===
In 2016, appointed incumbent Mark Lipparelli did not seek re-election. Nicole Cannizzaro was uncontested in the Democratic primary, while Assemblymembers Victoria Seaman and Erv Nelson faced off in the Republican primary. During their single terms in the legislature, Nelson supported and Seaman opposed a $1.5 billion tax increase providing more funding for public education. Although the Senate Republican Caucus endorsed Nelson, Seaman won with over 60% of the vote.

According to the Las Vegas Review-Journal, the general election would be a close race, and could determine whether the GOP would keep its majority in the Senate. Cannizzaro, a prosecutor in the Clark County district attorney's office, said she supported the recent education reforms and alternative education programs. She also indicated she would back expansion of programs treating mental health problems and programs combatting substance abuse. In August, around two months before the election, a poll was released showing Seaman at 45% and Cannizzaro at 41%, with a margin of error of 5.8%. The next month, the Democratic Party spread flyers that said Seaman "shares a vision" with Bunkerville cattle rancher Cliven Bundy, which Seaman called deceptive, saying she "had nothing to do with Cliven Bundy." According to the final campaign finance reports, Cannizzaro had raised almost $415,000, while Seaman had raised around $300,000. Cannizzaro ultimately won the election by around 2 percent, resulting in a Democratic Senate majority. Seaman blamed the loss on the expensive Republican primary, while Republican Senate Minority Leader Michael Roberson attributed the defeat to Democrats' registration edge in District 6.

2016 Nevada State Senate election, District 6
Primary election
| Party | Candidate | Votes | % |
|---|---|---|---|
| Republican | Victoria Seaman | 3,894 | 62.8 |
| Republican | Erv Nelson | 2,308 | 37.2 |
| Total votes | | 6,202 | 100 |
General election
| Democratic | Nicole Cannizzaro | 28,733 | 50.9 |
| Republican | Victoria Seaman | 27,697 | 49.1 |
| Total votes | | 56,430 | 100 |
| Democratic gain from Republican | | | |

=== 2014 appointment ===
Halfway through his term, incumbent Mark Hutchison was elected Lieutenant Governor of Nevada, causing the Clark County Commission to fill the vacancy by choosing one of several applicants. Almost a dozen candidates applied, among them Glenn E. Trowbridge and Mark Lipparelli, a former chairman of the Nevada Gaming Control Board supported by Senate Majority Leader Michael Roberson. Hutchison offered his letter of resignation to Governor Brian Sandoval on December 1, and the Clark County Commission unanimously chose Lipparelli to fill the position the following day. One of the county commissioners said the decision was influenced by Sandoval.

=== 2012 ===
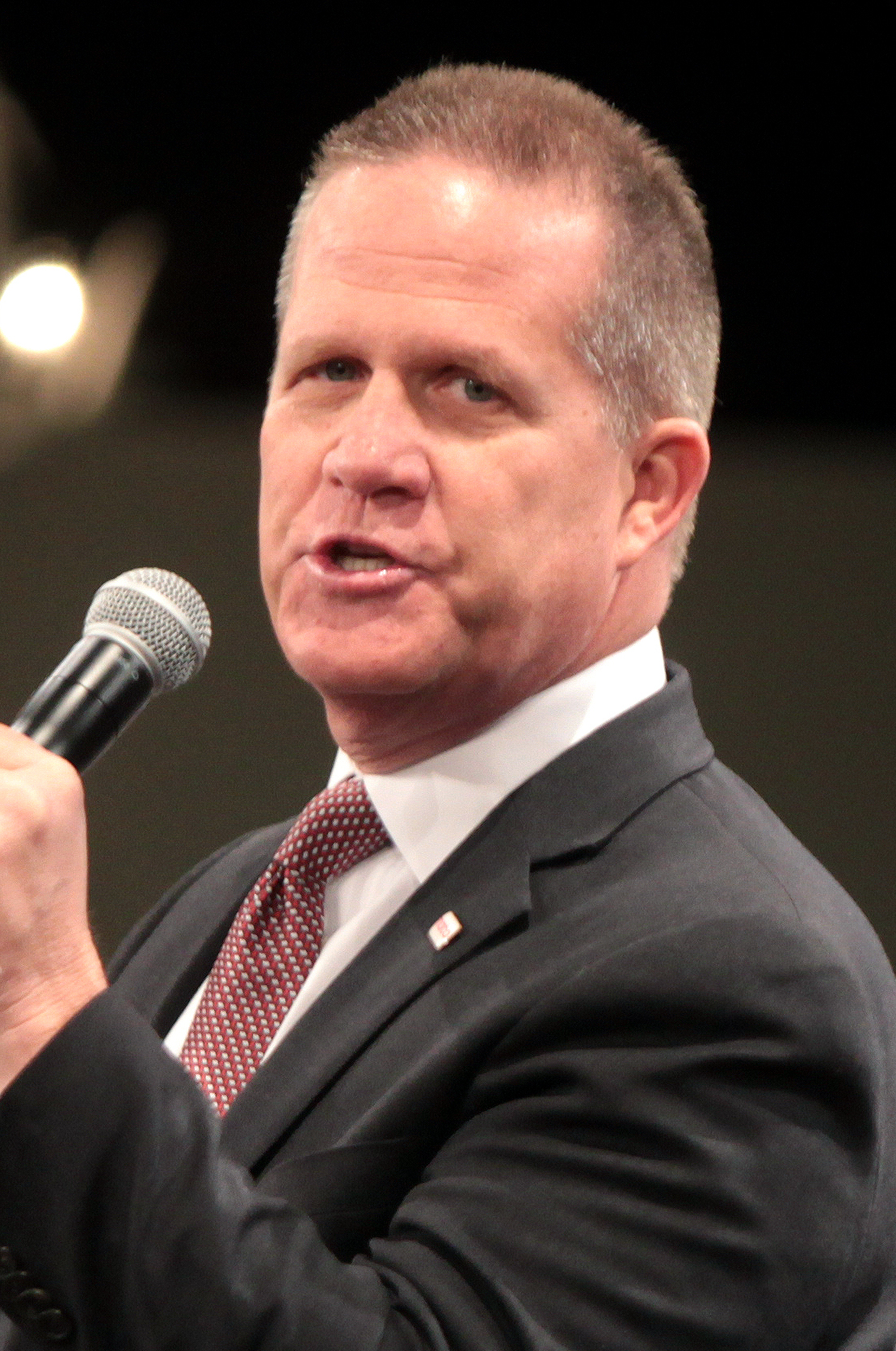
Republican Mark Hutchison won the election with a slim majority of the votes.

In 2012, incumbent Democrat Allison Copening chose not to seek re-election. Mark Hutchison was uncontested in the Republican primary, while Democrats could choose between Benny Yerushalmi and Thomas Welsh. Yerushalmi, who had unsuccessfully run for the Senate two years earlier, said he wanted to diversify the economy to reduce its reliance on tourism and gaming, and adjust the education system accordingly. Welsh, himself a failed candidate for the Assembly in the late 1990s, said he was frustrated with the status quo in the Senate, and supported education system reforms and foreclosure preventions. Yerushalmi defeated Welsh with around 55% of the vote.

Both general election candidates focussed on education and the economy. Hutchison, who also had never held public office, said school districts could save millions of dollars by rewarding construction projects to the lowest responsible bidder instead of caring about "prevailing wages" for the construction workers. Yerushalmi continued the rhetoric from his primary campaign, advocating for more cooperation between higher education and employers. Hutchison out-raised Yerushalmi $500,000 to $250,000, and won the election by a narrow margin.

2012 Nevada State Senate election, District 6
Primary election
| Party | Candidate | Votes | % |
|---|---|---|---|
| Democratic | Benny Yerushalmi | 2,510 | 55.5 |
| Democratic | Thomas Welsh | 2,009 | 44.5 |
| Total votes | | 4,519 | 100 |
General election
| Republican | Mark Hutchison | 27,499 | 50.8 |
| Democratic | Benny Yerushalmi | 26,598 | 49.2 |
| Total votes | | 54,097 | 100 |
| Republican gain from Democratic | | | |

=== Federal and statewide results ===
| Year | Office | Results |
|---|---|---|
| 2020 | President | Biden 52.3 – 45.8% |
| 2018 | Senate | Rosen 52.6 – 43.6% |
| 2018 | Governor | Sisolak 51.9 – 43.8% |
| 2016 | President | Clinton 49.6 – 44.8% |
| 2012 | President | Obama 51.8 – 46.6% |
| 2012 | Senate | Berkley 46.9 – 45.1% |

== History ==
The 6th district was created when the districts were redrawn in 2011 as a result of the 2010 Census. The borders of the redrawn districts went into effect on January 1, 2012 for filing for office, and for nominating and electing senators. They became effective for all other purposes on November 7 – the day after Election Day, when the new senator terms began. The borders of District 6 are defined in the Nevada Revised Statutes using census tracts, block groups, and blocks.

When it was established in the 1980s, Clark County Senate District 6 took up most of northwest Clark County, including Indian Springs, Mount Charleston, Blue Diamond, and the western suburbs of Las Vegas. In the 1990s, it contracted in size to accommodate the growing community of Summerlin and expanding suburbs in the western part of the Las Vegas Valley. It has been redrawn in the same general area since.

Former holders of the seat include Ray Rawson, Bob Beers and Allison Copening.
