= Nicole Cannizzaro =

American politician (born 1983)

Attorney General-elect of Nevada
- Assuming office January 4, 2027
- Governor: Aaron Ford (elect)
- Succeeding: Aaron Ford

Majority Leader of the Nevada Senate
- In office March 5, 2019 – November 17, 2026
- Preceded by: Kelvin Atkinson

Member of the Nevada Senate from the 6th district
- In office November 9, 2016 – November 17, 2026
- Preceded by: Mark Lipparelli

Personal details
- Born: Nicole Jeanette Cannizzaro; January 19, 1983 (age 43) Las Vegas, Nevada, U.S.
- Party: Democratic
- Spouse: Nate Ring
- Children: 3
- Education: University of Nevada, Reno (BA); University of Nevada, Las Vegas (JD)

Nicole Jeanette Cannizzaro (born January 19, 1983) is an American Democratic politician who is the attorney general-elect of Nevada. She previously served in the Nevada Senate. She represents the 6th district, which covers parts of Las Vegas.

Cannizzaro is the first woman to serve as Majority Leader of the Nevada Senate. Cannizzaro is the Democratic nominee for Nevada Attorney General in the 2026 elections.

== Biography ==
Cannizzaro was born in Las Vegas. She earned a bachelor's degree in business administration and management from the University of Nevada, Reno in 2006, and a Juris Doctor from the William S. Boyd School of Law at the University of Nevada, Las Vegas in 2010. Following graduation, she worked as a legal clerk and then began practicing law in Las Vegas. She joined the Clark County District Attorney's Office in 2011 where she served as a Chief Deputy District Attorney. After more than a decade at the Clark County District Attorney's Office, she returned to private practice in 2022.

Cannizzaro was elected to the Senate in 2016 by a narrow margin, defeating Republican Victoria Seaman. She was re-elected in 2020 and 2024. In July 2025, Cannizzaro announced she would run for Nevada Attorney General in the 2026 statewide election. She defeated State Treasurer Zach Conine in the primary.

After winning the election, Cannizzaro announced her resignation from the majority leader and the senate.

== Legislative initiatives ==
Cannizzaro has sponsored legislation on a variety of topics during her three terms in the Nevada Senate.

Public Safety:

- Senate Bill 263: Banning the possession, production, or distribution of AI generated child pornography
- Senate Bill 343: Increasing criminal penalties for trafficking fentanyl
- Senate Bill 440: Awarding back pay to state police and other state employees

Health care:

- Senate Bill 420: Creating a more affordable public health care option to be sold in Nevada's individual health care market
- Senate Bill 232: Expanding coverage for postpartum services for new mothers

Education:

- Senate Bill 231: Providing funding for 20% raises for public school teachers

Reproductive Rights:

- Senate Bill 131: Banning government agencies in Nevada from assisting other states' prosecutions of abortion patients or providers
- Senate Joint Resolution 7: Adding reproductive rights to the Nevada Constitution
- Senate Bill 179: Removing outdated criminal penalties for abortion from Nevada law
- Senate Bill 190: Expanding contraceptive access by allowing pharmacists to directly dispense birth control

== Personal life ==
Cannizzaro is married to Nate Ring. She has three children, who have appeared with her during Senate sessions.

== Electoral history ==
Nevada Senate District 6 election, 2016
Party	Candidate	Votes	%
Democratic	Nicole Cannizzaro	28,733	50.92
Republican	Victoria Seaman	27,697	49.08
Total votes		56,430	100.00

Nevada Senate District 6 election, 2020
Party	Candidate	Votes	%
Democratic	Nicole Cannizzaro	33,895	50.47
Republican	April Becker	33,264	49.53
Total votes		67,159	100.00

Nevada Senate District 6 general election, 2024
Party	Candidate	Votes	%
Democratic	Nicole Cannizzaro (incumbent)	37,171	51.69%
Republican	Jill Douglass	32,730	45.51%
Independent American	Brad Lee Barnhill	2,017	2.80%
Total votes		71,918	100%
Democratic hold			

Nevada Attorney General, Democratic Primary, 2026
Party	Candidate	Votes	%
Democratic	Nicole Cannizzaro	112,561	60.7
Democratic	Zach Conine	65,256	35.2
Total votes		185,587	100.00

Nevada Senate
Preceded by Kelvin Atkinson	Majority Leader of the Nevada Senate; 2019–2026	TBD
Legal offices
Preceded by Aaron Ford	Attorney General of Nevada; Taking office 2027	Elect
