= 2026 Nevada Attorney General election =

- November 3, 2026
- Votes counted: 98% as of November 21, 12:37 AM GMT
Nominee	Nicole Cannizzaro	Adriana Guzmán Fralick
Party	Democratic	Republican
Popular vote	608,249	446,641
Percentage	56.4%	41.4%
- Cannizzaro: 40–50% 50–60% 60–70% Fralick: 50–60% 60–70% 70–80%
Attorney General before election
Aaron D. Ford
Democratic
Elected Attorney General
Nicole Cannizzaro
Democratic

The 2026 Nevada Attorney General election took place on November 3, 2026, to elect the attorney general of Nevada. Incumbent Democratic attorney general Aaron Ford was term-limited and could not seek re-election to a third term in office, he instead ran successfully for governor of Nevada.

Primary elections took place on June 9, 2026. Majority leader of the Nevada Senate Nicole Cannizzaro won the Democratic primary with 60.7% of the vote over Nevada state treasurer Zach Conine. Adriana Guzmán Fralick won the Republican primary with 60.1% of the vote.

== Democratic primary ==
=== Candidates ===
==== Nominee ====
- Nicole Cannizzaro, majority leader of the Nevada Senate (2019–present) from the 6th district (2016–present)

==== Eliminated in primary ====
- Zach Conine, state treasurer of Nevada (2019–present)

==== Declined ====
- Sandra Jauregui, majority leader of the Nevada Assembly (2023–present) from the 41st district (2016–present) (ran for lieutenant governor)

=== Endorsements ===
Nicole Cannizzaro

State legislators

- Fabian Doñate, SD-10 (2021–present)
- Julie Pazina, SD-12 (2022–present)
- Angie Taylor, SD-15 (2024–present)

Labor unions

- AFL-CIO (co-endorsement with Conine)
- AFSCME Local 4041
- Culinary Workers Union (co-endorsement with Conine)
- International Brotherhood of Electrical Workers Locals 396 & 1245
- International Union of Operating Engineers Local 12
- Professional Fire Fighters of Nevada

Organizations

- EMILYs List
- Planned Parenthood Advocates Mar Monte
- Reproductive Freedom for All
- Vote Mama
Zach Conine

U.S. representatives

- Dina Titus, NV-01 (2013–present)

Labor unions

- AFL-CIO (co-endorsement with Cannizzaro)
- Communications Workers of America Local 9413
- Culinary Workers Union (co-endorsement with Cannizzaro)
- Heat and Frost Insulators Local 16
- Nevada State Education Association

Organizations

- Progressive Leadership Alliance of Nevada

Newspapers

- Las Vegas Sun
- Las Vegas Weekly

=== Results ===
Primary results by county: Cannizzaro: 50–60%; 60–70%; Conine: 30–40%

Democratic primary results
Party	Candidate	Votes	%
Democratic	Nicole Cannizzaro	112,561	60.7
Democratic	Zach Conine	65,256	35.2
None of These Candidates		7,770	4.2
Total votes		185,587	100.0

== Republican primary ==
=== Candidates ===
==== Nominee ====
- Adriana Guzmán Fralick, chair of Nevada's Cannabis Compliance Board

==== Eliminated in primary ====
- Danny Tarkanian, Douglas County commissioner (2021–present) and perennial candidate

=== Endorsements ===
Adriana Guzmán Fralick

Executive branch officials

- Donald Trump, president of the United States (2017–2021, 2025–present)

Statewide officials

- Joe Lombardo, governor of Nevada (2023–present)

Individuals

- Joey Gilbert, retired professional boxer, attorney, and candidate for governor in 2022

=== Polling ===
Poll source	Date(s) administered	Sample size (Note: Key: A – all adults RV – registered voters LV – likely voters V – unclear)	Margin of error	Adriana Guzmán Fralick	Danny Tarkanian	Undecided
Pulse Opinion Science (Note: Poll sponsored by Tarkanian's campaign)	March 19–22, 2026	410 (LV)	± 4.8%	17%	55%	27%

=== Results ===
Primary results by county: Fralick: 40–50%; 50–60%; 60–70%; Tarkanian: 40–50%; 50–60%

Republican primary results
Party	Candidate	Votes	%
Republican	Adriana Guzmán Fralick	111,922	60.1
Republican	Danny Tarkanian	64,402	34.6
None of These Candidates		9,864	5.3
Total votes		186,188	100.0

== General election ==
=== Predictions ===
Source	Ranking	As of
Sabato's Crystal Ball	Lean D	August 25, 2026

==== Post-primary endorsements ====
Nicole Cannizzaro (D)

Organizations

- Democratic Attorneys General Association
- End Citizens United
- Everytown for Gun Safety
- Giffords

Newspapers

- Las Vegas Sun
Adriana Guzmán Fralick (R)

Newspapers

- Las Vegas Review-Journal

=== Polling ===
Poll source	Date(s) administered	Sample size	Margin of error	Nicole Cannizzaro (D)	Adriana Guzmán Fralick (R)	Other	Undecided
Noble Predictive Insights	October 26–28, 2026	487 (LV)	± 4.4%	50%	42%	1% (Note: "Another candidate not listed" with 1%)	6%
Global Strategy Group (D) (Note: DGA)	September 27 – October 1, 2026	—	± 3.5%	47%	44%	—	—
Noble Predictive Insights	September 22–26, 2026	800 (RV)	± 3.5%	42%	31%	8% (Note: "None of these candidates" with 6%; "Another candidate" with 2%)	20%
Noble Predictive Insights	September 22–26, 2026	708 (LV)	± 3.7%	45%	37%	4% (Note: "None of these candidates" with 3%; "Another candidate" with 1%)	13%

=== Results ===
2026 Nevada Attorney General election
Party	Candidate	Votes	%	±%
Democratic	Nicole Cannizzaro			
Republican	Adriana Guzmán Fralick			
None of These Candidates				
Total votes			100.0	

== Notes ==
Partisan clients

== See also ==
- 2026 United States attorney general elections
