= Westgate Las Vegas =

Casino hotel in Winchester, Nevada

Coordinates: 36°8′8″N 115°9′9″W

Westgate Las Vegas Resort & Casino

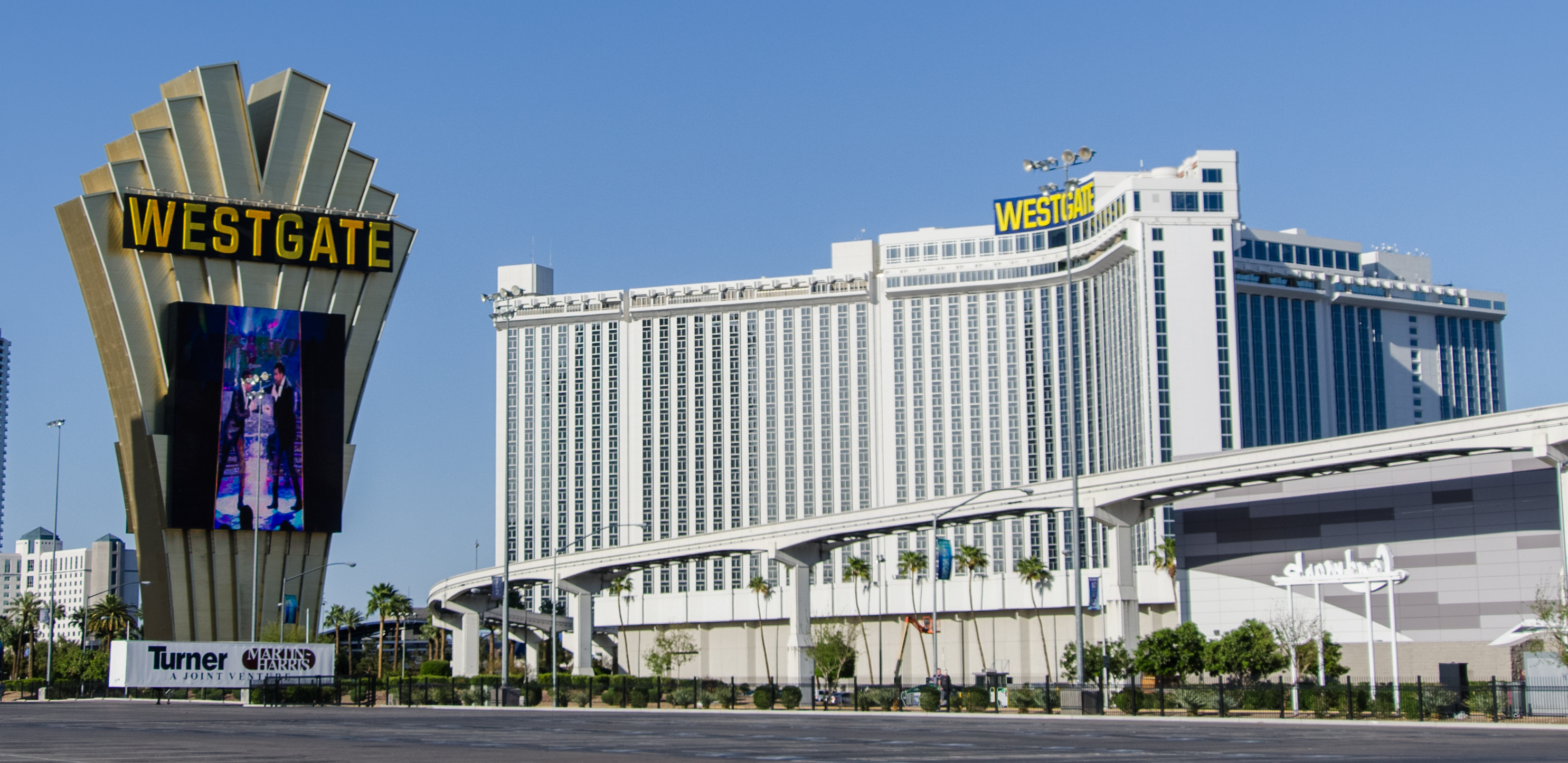
- The property as seen in 2018
- Interactive map of Westgate Las Vegas Resort & Casino
- Location: Winchester, Nevada, U.S.; 3000 Paradise Road
- Opened: July 2, 1969; 57 years ago (as The International)
- No. of rooms: 2,956
- Gaming space: 54,923 square feet (5,102.5 m^{2})
- Permanent shows: The Magic of Jen Kramer; Manilow: The Hits Come Home
- Notable restaurants: Benihana; Edge Steakhouse; Fresco Italiano; Silk Road Asian Bistro
- Casino type: Land-based
- Owner: Westgate Resorts
- Operating license holder: GVII LLC
- Architect: Martin Stern Jr.
- Previous names: International (1969–1971); Las Vegas Hilton (1971–2012); LVH – Las Vegas Hotel and Casino (2012–2014)
- Renovated in: 1975, 1979, 1981, 1982, 1984, 1995, 1999, 2014–2016
- Website: westgatelasvegas.com

The Westgate Las Vegas Resort & Casino is a hotel, casino, and timeshare resort in Winchester, Nevada. Located near the northern end of the Las Vegas Strip, it is owned by Westgate Resorts. It opened in 1969 as the International Hotel, and was known for many years as the Las Vegas Hilton, then briefly as the LVH – Las Vegas Hotel and Casino. From 1981 to 1990, it was the largest hotel in the world.

The hotel and casino occupy a 64-acre (26 ha) site on the east side of Paradise Road. The 30-story hotel tower is 375 feet (114 m) tall with 2,956 rooms. while the casino has 54,923 square feet (5,102.5 m^{2}) of gaming space and a sportsbook called the Superbook. There are also a food court, a convention center, recreational amenities, and a Las Vegas Monorail station. Martin Stern designed the hotel in the International Style, with a Y-shaped design inspired by the UNESCO Headquarters. The property's entertainment venues include the 1,607-seat International Theater, the 400-seat Westgate Cabaret, and an attraction themed to Elvis Presley (a frequent performer in the hotel's early years). The resort formerly included an attraction called Star Trek: The Experience. The hotel has also hosted professional boxing and other sports.

After the site was acquired in 1967 by real estate developer Kirk Kerkorian, the International Hotel opened there on July 2, 1969. Hilton Hotels soon bought the hotel and renamed it the Las Vegas Hilton in July 1971, adding two expansions in 1975 and 1979. An arson in 1981 killed eight people and damaged the hotel. Hilton opened the Superbook in 1986 and added the Sky Villas in 1995. The resort was sold to Colony Capital for $280 million in 2004, but due to the Great Recession, Colony defaulted on its loans. The property was renamed LVH – Las Vegas Hotel and Casino in 2012, and Goldman Sachs and Gramercy Capital bought it that year. Westgate Resorts purchased the property in 2014 and subsequently began renovating it, converting rooms into timeshares.

== Facilities ==
The Westgate is located on a 64-acre (26 ha) site on the east side of Paradise Road, approximately 0.4 miles (0.64 km) east of Las Vegas Boulevard. It is adjacent to the Las Vegas Convention Center to the south and Las Vegas Country Club to the east.

The hotel has 2,956 rooms. The hotel tower is 375 feet (114 m) tall, with 30 floors. The top floor consists of three "Sky Villas" geared towards "high roller" customers, each with a private swimming pool and at least 12,000 square feet (1,100 m^{2}) of space.

The casino has 54,923 square feet (5,102.5 m^{2}) of gaming space as of 2017, with 576 slot machines, 38 table games, a poker room with 7 tables, and a race and sports book. The casino's sportsbook, the SuperBook, is billed as the largest in the world.

The Westgate has various eateries, including fine dining restaurants, a buffet, and a food court. Benihana Village, opened in 1974, is a Japanese-themed area with streams and gardens, with several restaurants centered around its namesake teppanyaki grill.

The Westgate's convention center has 225,000 square feet (20,900 m^{2}) of event space, including the 70,000 sq ft (6,500 m^{2}) Paradise Event Center (formerly the Hilton Center) and the 43,000 sq ft (4,000 m^{2}) Pavilion (formerly the Hilton Pavilion).

Recreation amenities at the Westgate include a 5-acre (2.0 ha) pool deck, a fitness center, a 10,000-square-foot (930 m^{2}) spa, and six tennis courts. The hotel also has several retail shops, a wedding chapel, and a business center.

The Westgate station of the Las Vegas Monorail is located at the front of the property. The Vegas Loop can also be found here.

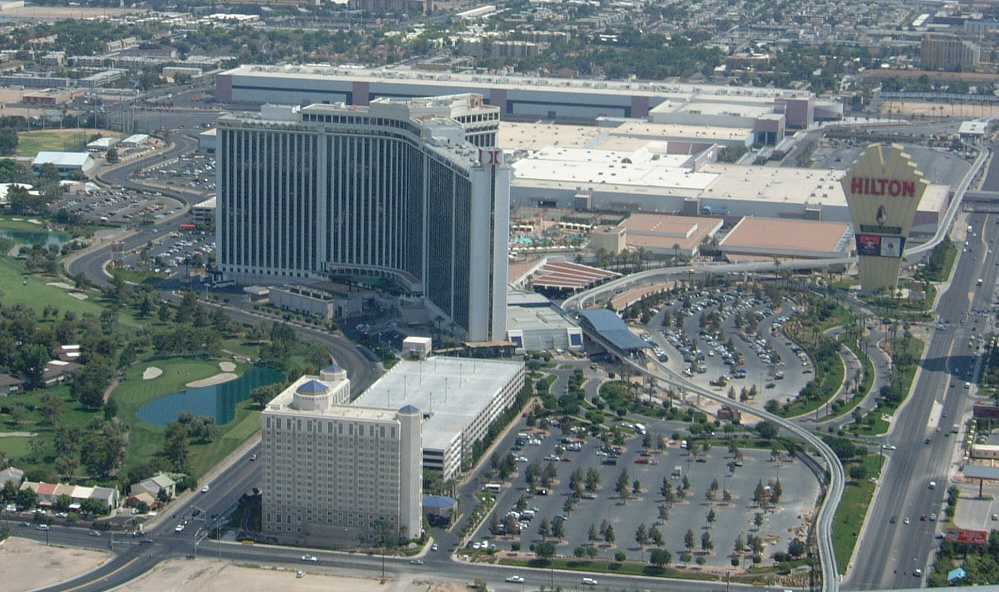
Layout of the property as seen in 2003, facing southward

1	Hotel tower, east wing
2	Hotel tower, north wing
3	Hilton Pavilion
4	Hilton Center
5	Marquee sign
6	Main entrance
7	Star Trek: The Experience

8	Monorail station
9	North parking garage
10	Hilton Grand Vacations building
11	Las Vegas Convention Center
12	Las Vegas Country Club
13	Paradise Road

== History ==
=== International Hotel (1969–1971) ===
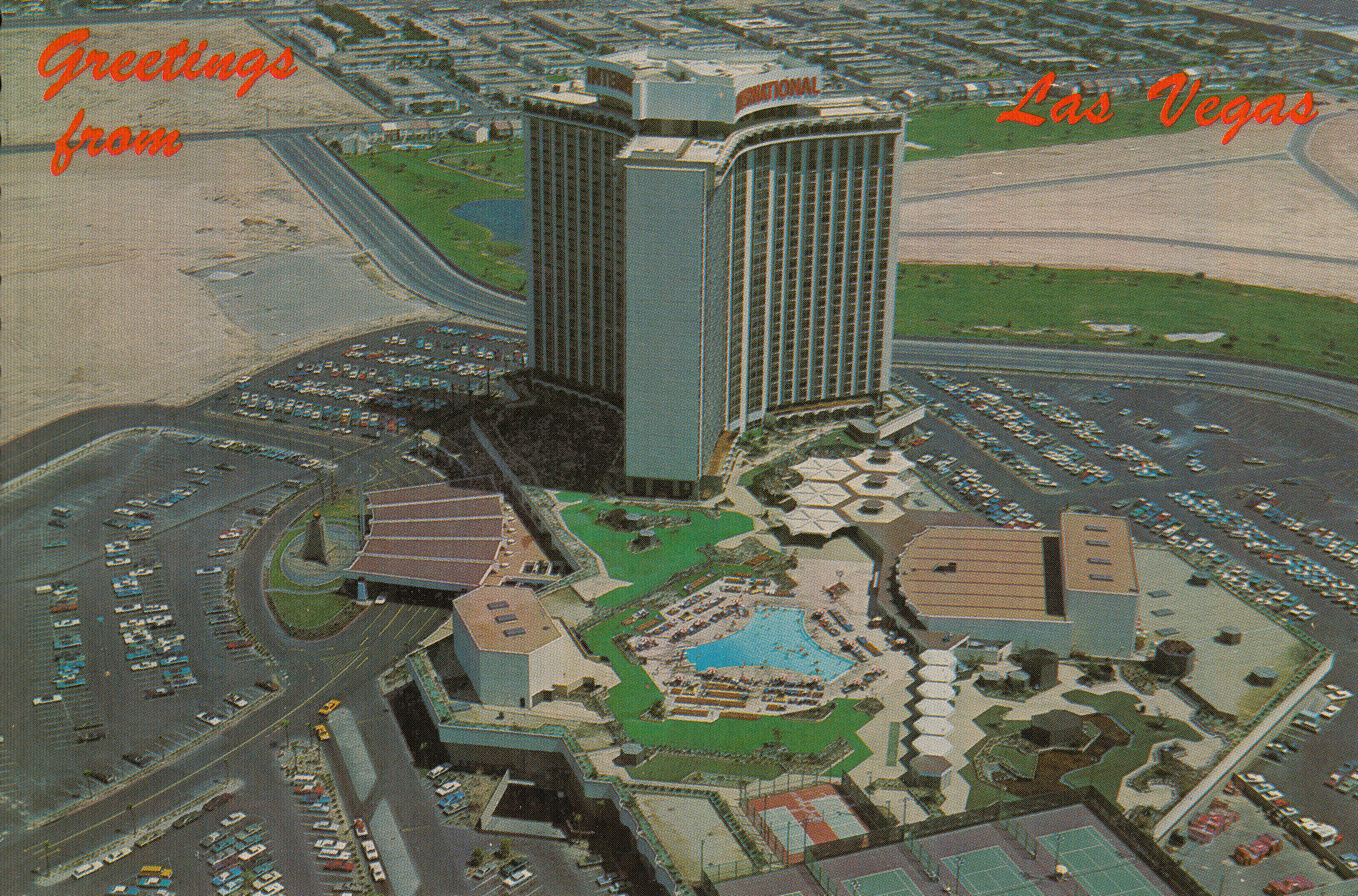
A photo postcard of the International Hotel

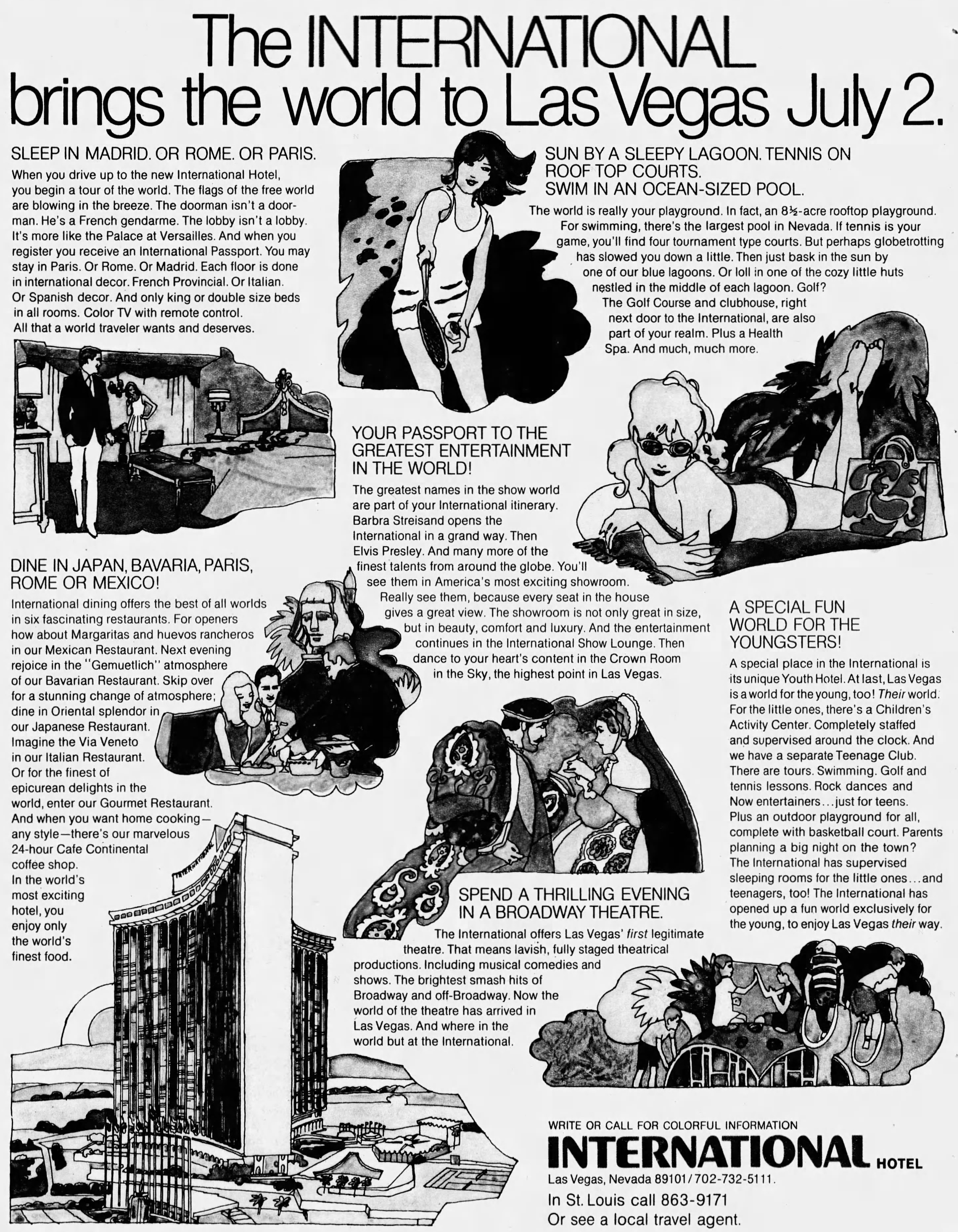
Newspaper advertisement for the 1969 grand opening of the hotel

The hotel site was previously part of the grounds of Las Vegas Park, a defunct racetrack. In 1965, the 400-acre (160 ha) track site was purchased by National Equities, a real estate development firm chaired by Marvin Kratter. Kratter announced development plans for the site to include a 40-floor, 1,500-room hotel, as well as a golf course and private homes.

Meanwhile, Kirk Kerkorian, the chairman of Trans International Airlines and landlord of Caesars Palace, began formulating plans to build a 1,000-room casino hotel in Las Vegas. After considering several potential locations, he selected the racetrack site, reasoning that it was natural to put a hotel next to the Convention Center. Kratter had decided not to build a hotel himself, and in 1967, National Equities sold a 65.5-acre (26.5 ha) portion of the site to Kerkorian for $5 million. Kerkorian announced that he would build a 30-story hotel with 1,510 rooms, at a cost of $50 million. Some believed it was very risky to build such a property away from the Strip, but Kerkorian believed that it would spark the development of a "second Strip" along Paradise Road.

Kerkorian's hotel would be named the International Hotel, matching the name of Kratter's International Country Club (now the Las Vegas Country Club). He hired airline executive Fred Benninger to oversee the development, and Martin Stern Jr., who had designed several noted Las Vegas high-rises, as the hotel's architect. The general contractor selected to build the hotel was Taylor Construction Co. Construction began with an elaborate groundbreaking ceremony in February 1968.

With planning for the hotel underway, Kerkorian purchased the Flamingo casino, to serve as a training ground for the International's staff. Later, during the International's construction, Kerkorian formed the publicly traded company International Leisure to own the two casinos.

Howard Hughes, the eccentric billionaire who had purchased several Las Vegas casinos, saw Kerkorian as a rival and the International as unwelcome competition. He attempted to deter Kerkorian from building the project, first by making a sham announcement of a major planned expansion of his Sands Hotel, and then by conveying false claims to Kerkorian about damage to buildings from nearby nuclear tests. When these ruses failed, Hughes schemed to buy the project from Kerkorian and halt its construction, but this plan came to nothing. Ultimately, Hughes decided to compete head-on with the International by purchasing the unfinished Landmark Hotel and Casino, located across the street. Hughes completed construction of the Landmark and opened it one day before Kerkorian's hotel.

The International Hotel opened on July 2, 1969. At the time, it was Nevada's tallest building and largest hotel. Entertainment director Bill Miller signed Barbra Streisand to open in the showroom, along with Peggy Lee performing in the hotel's lounge.

In keeping with the hotel's name, rooms were furnished with different international decors, with each floor featuring either a Spanish, Italian, or French theme. There was also a complex of international restaurants, offering Bavarian, Italian, Japanese and Mexican cuisines. Employees were outfitted in costumes from different cultures, such as Scottish kilts, Slavic shirts, and French gendarme uniforms.

On July 31, 1969, immediately following Streisand's engagement, Elvis Presley performed the first show of what would become a seven-year run at the hotel, encompassing 636 consecutive sold-out shows.

Late in 1969, Kerkorian made plans to raise $29 million through a secondary offering of International Leisure stock. He needed the money to help pay off loans that he had taken out to purchase major stakes in Metro-Goldwyn-Mayer and Western Airlines. The offering was rejected, however, by the Securities and Exchange Commission, because the company was unable to provide five years of financial history for the Flamingo. Short on cash, Kerkorian was forced to put International Leisure up for sale.

=== Las Vegas Hilton (1971–2012) ===
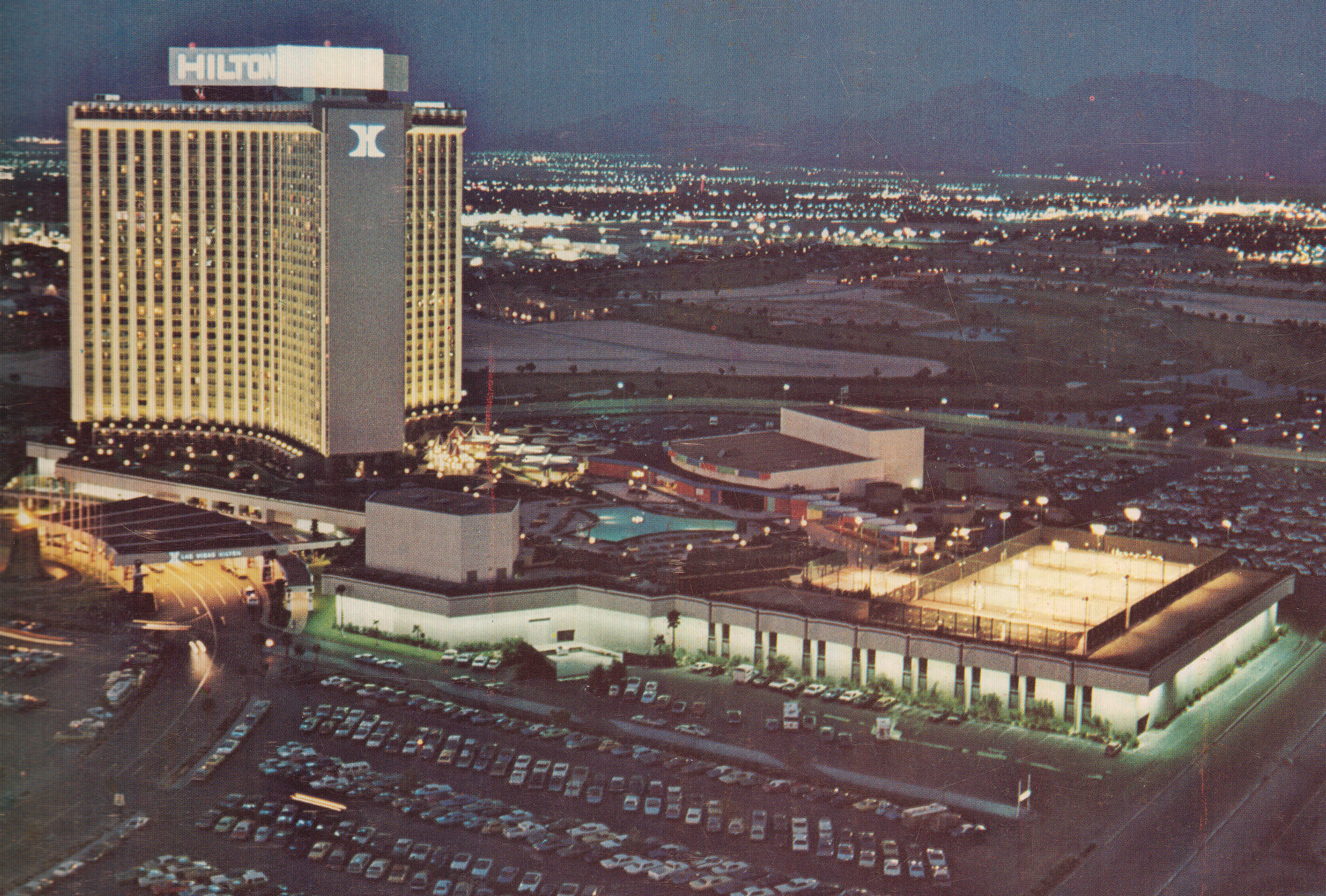
The Las Vegas Hilton in the early 1970s

In 1970 and 1971, Kerkorian sold his shares of International Leisure to Hilton Hotels. The International was renamed the Las Vegas Hilton in July 1971. Hilton took complete ownership in 1972, acquiring all outstanding shares of International Leisure.

The hotel had performed unevenly in its early years as the International, but as the Hilton, it soon came to be regarded as the most successful hotel in Las Vegas.

An east tower extension with 620 rooms was completed in 1975 at a cost of $20 million. In 1977, the hotel opened the Hilton Pavilion, a $7.5-million venue for sports and entertainment events, with a seating capacity of up to 5,000 people. A $23-million expansion added another 644 rooms to the north tower. The general contractor selected to build the expansion was Del E. Webb Corporation. Ground was broken in 1977 and it was completed in 1979.

==== 1981 fire ====
On the night of February 10, 1981, a major fire occurred at the Hilton. Philip Bruce Cline, a hotel busboy who was under the influence of drugs, set fire to a curtain in an elevator lobby on the eighth floor of the east tower. The fire spread to the exterior of the tower and then traveled up to the top of the building within 25 minutes. Eight people were killed, and approximately 350 were injured, including 48 firefighters. Among the victims treated for smoke inhalation was singer Natalie Cole.

The casino and hotel reopened nine days after the fire with 1,000 available rooms. The rest of the rooms were repaired over the following three months, at an estimated cost of $10 million.

Cline was convicted in 1982 of arson and murder and sentenced to life in prison without parole. Hilton and other companies involved in the hotel paid a $23 million settlement to victims. The tragedy, in combination with the MGM Grand fire that had occurred months earlier, inspired major changes to Nevada's fire safety regulations.

==== 1981–2012 ====
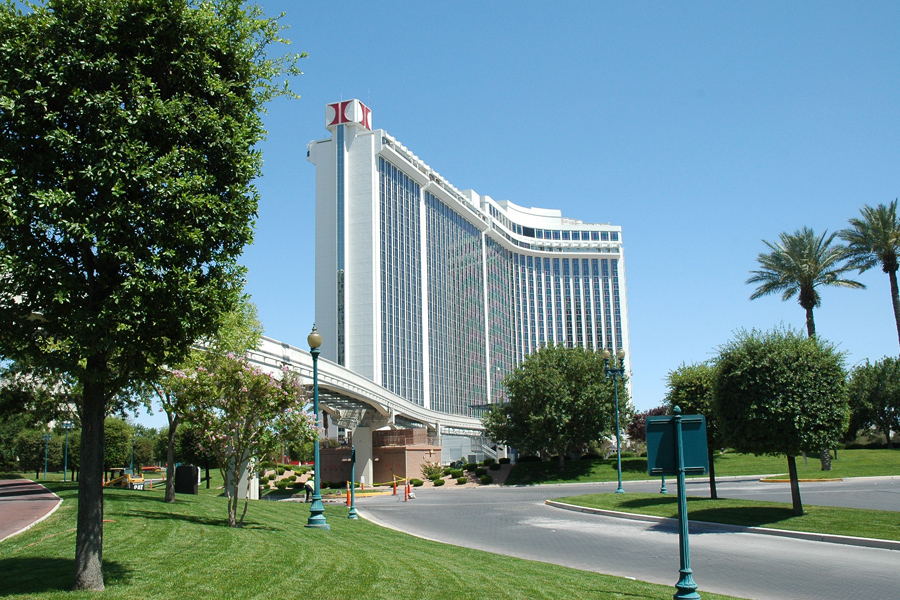
Hotel with former Hilton logo and branding in 2007

Around the end of 1981, another extension to the north tower was completed, adding 391 rooms at a cost of $21 million. This made the Las Vegas Hilton the largest hotel in the world, with a total of 3,174 rooms. (The Rossiya Hotel in Moscow had more rooms, but was not deemed to be a larger hotel by the Guinness Book of World Records because many of its rooms were used as dormitories.) It held this title until 1990, when it was surpassed by the Flamingo.

In 1984, the hotel completed construction of the $10-million Hilton Center, a 70,000-square-foot (6,500 m^{2}) convention and event space at the southwest corner of the property, west of the Hilton Pavilion.

In 1986, amid growing popularity of sports betting in Nevada, the Hilton opened its race and sports book, the Superbook, at a cost of $17 million.

In 1991, the Hilton was at the center of the Tailhook scandal, in which numerous United States Navy officers were accused of acts of sexual assault during a convention at the hotel. One of the victims, Paula Coughlin, sued the Hilton for providing inadequate security for the convention, and eventually was paid a $5.2 million judgment. The lawsuit led Hilton to successfully lobby for the so-called "Tailhook bill", a state law shielding hotels from liability for injuries to patrons caused by third parties.

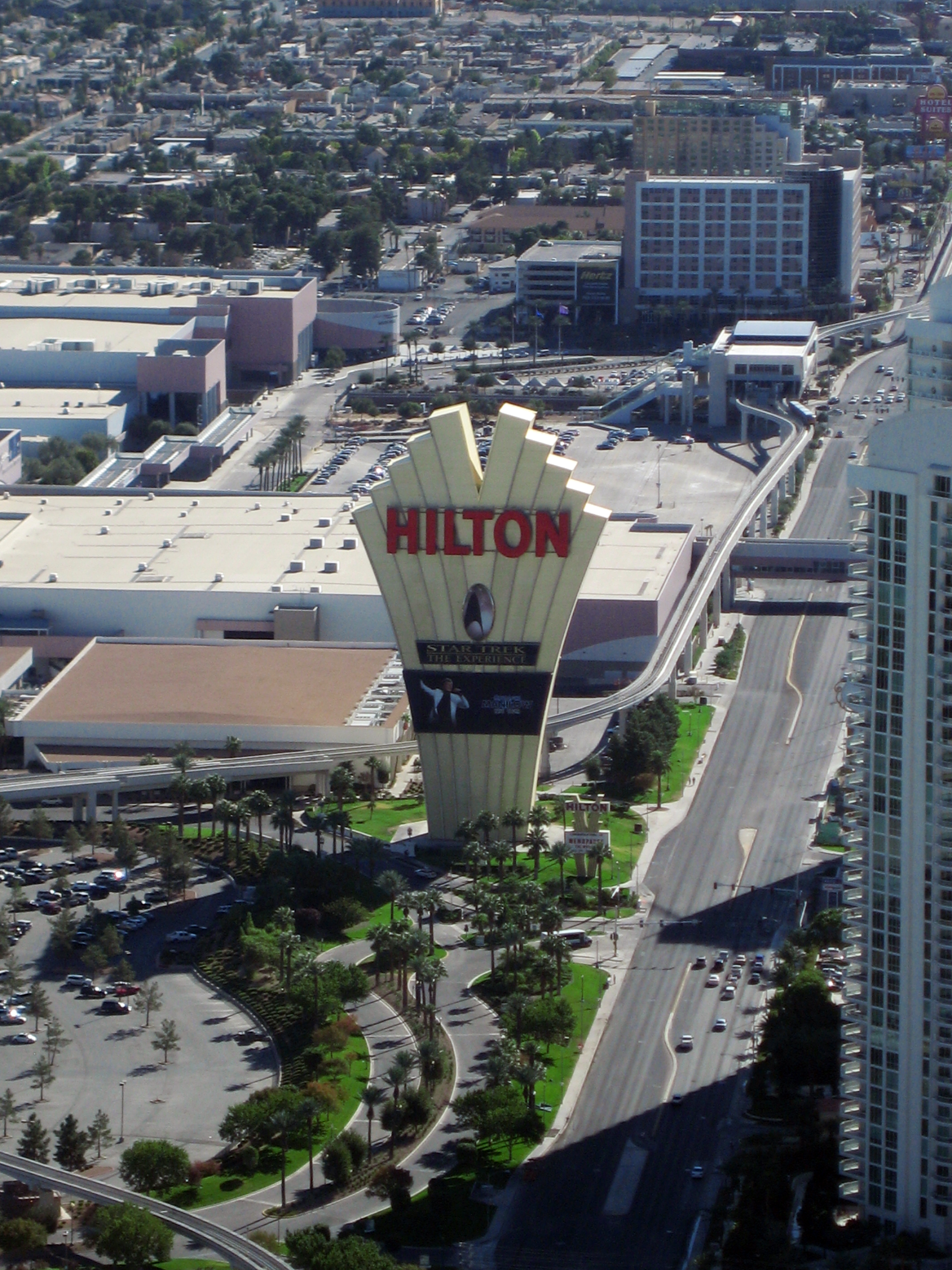
The Las Vegas Hilton sign, at 279 feet (85 m), is the tallest free-standing advertising sign in the world.

The property's original marquee sign was approximately 150 feet (46 m) tall and stood for 24 years, until it was removed in 1993. The hotel completed a new 362-foot (110 m), $4-million marquee sign in 1994. Later that year, however, it was partially destroyed by a windstorm. The sign was reconstructed in 1997 for $9 million with a reduced height of 279 feet (85 m), making it the world's tallest free-standing advertising sign.

In 1994, the hotel entered an arrangement with the Sahara Country Club, which was renamed as the Las Vegas Hilton Country Club. This lasted until 1997, when the course became the Las Vegas National Golf Club. Hilton attempted to buy the neighboring Las Vegas Country Club the following year, but its $60-million offer was rejected.

In 1995, the Hilton completed a $40-million renovation of its penthouse floor to construct the Sky Villas. The hotel also spent $12 million on a new room for baccarat, a favorite game of Asian high rollers. The Hilton at the time was one of only four Las Vegas casinos able to compete for the business of the "whales", the top tier of high rollers.

In 1998, Hilton spun off its casino properties, including the Las Vegas Hilton, as Park Place Entertainment.

Hilton's timeshare arm, Hilton Grand Vacations, began construction of a complex at the northeast corner of the property in 1998. It opened in 1999 with 230 suites.

Around 1999, Park Place began seeking a buyer for the Las Vegas Hilton, because the company hoped to concentrate on its properties on the Las Vegas Strip, especially the newly acquired Caesars Palace. In 2000, Park Place agreed to sell the Hilton to Edward Roski Jr. for $365 million. Roski planned to transform the Hilton to shift its focus away from high rollers and toward convention attendees. The deal fell through, however, and the property was locked up in litigation between Park Place and Roski until 2003, when they settled their claims against each other.

The Las Vegas Monorail opened in 2004, with one of its stations located at the Hilton. The system had been under construction since 2001. Hilton had led the group of hotels that had promulgated the proposal for the monorail as early as 1996.

In June 2004, Caesars Entertainment (formerly Park Place) sold the Las Vegas Hilton to Colony Capital for $280 million. Colony partnered in the purchase with Goldman Sachs, which also lent $200 million of the purchase price. In 2005, the Hilton was placed under the banner of Colony's newly formed casino affiliate, Resorts International Holdings, which was headquartered at the property.

The Hilton prospered in its first few years under Colony's management, but began losing money in the face of the Great Recession and an oversupply of hotel rooms in Las Vegas. In June 2011, the Hilton began defaulting on payments to Goldman Sachs on the loan. The same month, Hilton Worldwide opted to terminate its franchise agreement with the property, effective at the end of the year, because the facilities had fallen below the standards of the Hilton brand.

Goldman Sachs issued a foreclosure notice in September 2011. At Goldman's request, a court appointed a receiver to take control of the property.

=== LVH (2012–2014) ===
On January 3, 2012, the Las Vegas Hilton became the LVH – Las Vegas Hotel and Casino, as the contract to use the Hilton brand ended.

Colony Capital initially tried to fight against foreclosure of the property, but ultimately concluded that its equity in the LVH was worthless, and agreed to let the foreclosure proceed. Goldman Sachs formed a joint venture with Gramercy Capital to acquire the property. They bought the property at its foreclosure auction in October 2012, where they were the only bidder. The Navegante Group was retained to manage the LVH on their behalf.

In 2013, the LVH affiliated with the Leo Hotel Collection, a network of independent hotels newly created by Red Lion Hotels.

=== Westgate Las Vegas (2014–present) ===
On June 30, 2014, timeshare developer Westgate Resorts bought the LVH from Goldman and Gramercy for a price between $150 and $170 million. Westgate CEO David Siegel was hoisted to the top of the hotel's sign the following day to begin removing the letters "LVH" to make way for the property's new name, Westgate Las Vegas. Siegel stated that the company would spend at least $160 million on renovations, and that it would begin converting hotel rooms into timeshare units. According to Siegel, the timeshare conversion would take 15 to 20 years, and, even after its completion, at least 30 percent of the units would remain available as hotel rooms at any given time.

Westgate retained Paragon Gaming to replace Navegante as the property's manager in 2015. In 2020, GVII LLC, a company formed by former gaming regulator Mark Lipparelli, replaced Paragon as the casino manager.

In 2023, a tunnel was drilled to the resort for a future Las Vegas Convention Center Loop underground Tesla shuttle service station.

== Architecture ==
Martin Stern designed the hotel in the International Style of architecture. Architect Stefan Al described the building's aesthetics as a milestone in the corporatization of Las Vegas: "Characterized by its rectilinear forms and bare surfaces, stripped of ornamentation, this elite form of architecture stood miles away from the Mafia-tainted neon of existing casinos." Architecture critic Alan Hess also noted the simplicity of the International (and the nearby Landmark Hotel) in comparison to older casinos: "As singular, self-contained forms, they showed none of the complexity of the different pieces and sequential additions that made the original Strip visually and urbanistically richer."

The UNESCO Headquarters building, which inspired the Y-shaped plan for the hotel tower

The Y-shaped plan for the hotel tower was inspired by the UNESCO Headquarters building; it was chosen to maximize the number of rooms that could be fit into a square plot while allowing each room to have a satisfactory view. This design was imitated by later Las Vegas hotels such as the Mirage, Mandalay Bay, and Venetian.

The International has been cited as the first Las Vegas "megaresort" (though that distinction is often instead credited to the Mirage, opened in 1989). It was the first to house all of the hotel's functions in a single large structure, whereas earlier casinos had housed them in separate buildings. The design of the property, along with the next Kerkorian/Stern project, the original MGM Grand Hotel and Casino, had a major influence on the development of the modern casino resort. As gaming historian David G. Schwartz describes it:

The casino resorts designed by Kerkorian and Stern became the favored models for both the next generation of Strip resorts and the resorts that, after 1978, could be found throughout the United States. When you enter a casino with a sweeping porte cochere, attached parking garage, barn-like casino/entertainment/retail complex, and high-rise hotel towers, you are in a design first realized by Stern and Kerkorian.

== Entertainment ==
=== International Theater ===
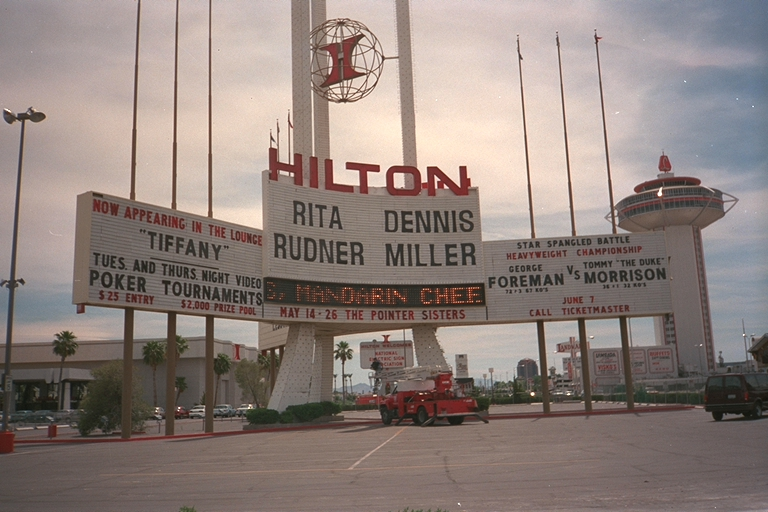
The original Las Vegas Hilton marquee in 1993, shortly before its removal. The Landmark Hotel is visible off to the right of the picture.

The property's main entertainment venue is the 1,607-seat International Theater. Since 2018, the theater hosts Barry Manilow's residency show, The Hits Come Home.

From the opening of the hotel in 1969, the main showroom was a "star policy" venue, meaning that popular musical artists and comedians were booked to perform for two to four weeks at a time. The typical schedule comprised two shows per night: a dinner show at 8 pm and a cocktail show at midnight.

The theater was a place of Elvis Presley's historic concert residency that ran from 1969 to 1976 and sold out a record-breaking 636 shows. At that time, the capacity of the venue was 2,000 attendees.

One of the most famous engagements at the hotel was that of singer and pianist Liberace. A longtime mainstay of Las Vegas showrooms, Liberace debuted at the Hilton in 1972, and began appearing regularly in 1973. He performed in the showroom for as many as 17 weeks out of the year, earning as much as $175,000 per week. Liberace's shows were known for his flamboyant costumes and for his being driven onstage in a Rolls-Royce limousine. He appeared at the Hilton as late as 1982. Hilton chairman Barron Hilton remembered Liberace as "one of the most popular entertainers ever to grace the stage of the Las Vegas Hilton showroom."

In 1982, the production show Bal du Moulin Rouge opened in the theater, featuring a cast of acrobats, dancers, and variety acts. The show centered around a 45-minute slot for a headline performer, which was filled at times by Suzanne Somers, Charo, and others. Shifting to a production show was intended to reduce the Hilton's entertainment costs by avoiding the need to book bigger stars, whose salaries had been spiraling ever higher. The show closed in 1986, and the theater returned to star policy.

Singer Wayne Newton, another longtime Las Vegas star, headlined the Hilton showroom from 1987 to 1993. By the end of his run, he was performing there twenty weeks out of the year, and was described as the highest-paid entertainer on the Las Vegas Strip. Newton's shows were known for beginning with him descending onto the stage in a spaceship amid a laser show. He made over 950 performances in total.

In 1993, the Andrew Lloyd Webber musical Starlight Express opened in the main theater. The Hilton Showroom was renamed as the Hilton Theatre, and underwent a $12-million renovation to add bridges and embankments to accommodate the show, which features performers on roller skates. The opening of the show was cited as part of a trend in Las Vegas toward family-friendly attractions and away from individual headliner acts. The show was signed to a five-year contract, but closed early in 1997 amid lagging ticket sales. The hotel then adopted a "limited star policy" for the theater, booking headline acts for runs of less than a week at a time.

In the early 2000s, the theater kept a rotating stable of headliners who each performed for ten weeks out of the year, including at times The Commodores, The Righteous Brothers, Sheena Easton, The Fab Four, Engelbert Humperdinck, and The Smothers Brothers.

Manilow began an extended run at the Hilton in 2005. His engagement was an early example of the trend of major recording artists establishing residency shows in Las Vegas, which was begun by Celine Dion at Caesars Palace in 2003. His show began as Manilow: Music and Passion, and was then revamped in 2008 as Ultimate Manilow: The Hits. The show ended in 2009. In November 2018, Paula Abdul revealed she was initially offered to do a show in the International Theater in 2005 but felt she wasn't the right artist to perform in it as it was "so special and magical", so she told Hilton Hotels to offer it to Manilow.

During the summer of 2006, Reba McEntire performed her residency show, Reba: Key to the Heart, which ran for five non-consecutive weeks.

The American TV Game Show Hall of Fame logo

The $250,000 Game Show Spectacular ran from October 2007 to April 2008. The show rotated through three hosts: creator Bob Eubanks, Chuck Woolery, and Jamie Farr. A temporary "American TV Game Show Hall of Fame" opened and closed on site in conjunction with the show, inducting Peter Marshall, Hugh Downs, Wink Martindale, and Monty Hall. The concept was originated by entertainment publicist Jerry Digney. The logo was designed by Dan Acree.

Recent long-running shows in the theater include the classic rock tribute show Raiding the Rock Vault, from 2013 to 2014, and the Prince tribute show Purple Reign, from 2016 to 2017.

=== Westgate Cabaret ===
Smaller shows are hosted in the 400-seat Westgate Cabaret. This venue hosts magician Jen Kramer (since 2018), Motown tribute act Soul of Motown (since 2019), and the comedy night Comedy Cabaret (since 2023).

Starting in the 1990s, the venue was known as The NightClub. Combining elements of a dance club and a traditional Las Vegas lounge, it helped pave the way for dance clubs to open in many Las Vegas casinos.

The NightClub was renamed as the Shimmer Cabaret in 2004 when the Hilton came under the ownership of Colony Capital. Long-running acts at the Shimmer Cabaret included comedian David Brenner (2004–05), musical comedies Menopause the Musical (2006–09) and Nunsense (2010–13), show band The Scintas (2007–09), singer Lani Misalucha (2009–10), topless revue Sin City Bad Girls (2009–10), impressionists Greg London (2011–12) and Rich Little (2012–13), a Rat Pack tribute show led by Sandy Hackett (2011–13), Purple Reign (2014–16), and the "Icons of Comedy" series (2011–12), featuring comedians such as Gilbert Gottfried and Hal Sparks.

In 2015, after the hotel was purchased by Westgate, the room was given its current name. Previous productions and headliners at the Westgate Cabaret include the adult revue Sexxy (2015–21), funk band Cameo and comedian Vinnie Favorito, (both 2016–17), comedian George Wallace (2018–21), and rock band The Bronx Wanderers (2021–22)

=== Star Trek: The Experience ===
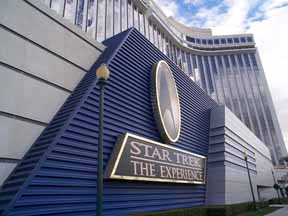
Sign outside of the Star Trek attraction

In January 1998, Star Trek: The Experience opened, featuring a motion simulator ride, a museum, and Quark's Bar. A portion of the casino floor was transformed into the SpaceQuest Casino, a space-themed casino complete with high-tech table games, which served as the gateway to the Experience.

In March 2004, a new Borg Invasion 4D ride was added.

The attraction closed in September 2008, after the operator, Cedar Fair, could not agree on terms for a renewed lease with the Hilton.

== Elvis Presley and legacy ==
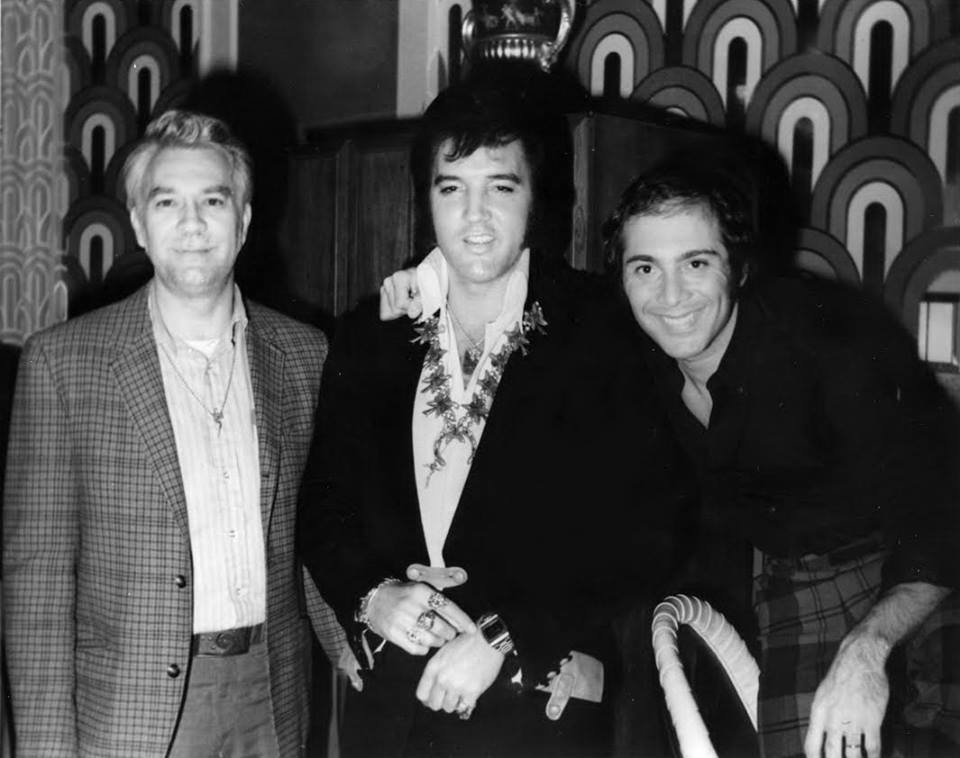
Elvis Presley with Bill Porter and Paul Anka at the hotel, then known as Las Vegas Hilton, on August 5, 1972.

Elvis Presley was signed for a four-week engagement in 1969 as the second performer to appear in the International's showroom, following Barbra Streisand. It would be his first public stage appearance in eight years. Presley's first show proved so popular that the hotel immediately signed him to a five-year contract for two month-long engagements per year. He would go on to perform a total of 636 shows at the hotel from 1969 to 1976, with every show sold out. Presley's run of performances at the Hilton was cut short by his death in August 1977.

During his engagements at the hotel, Presley famously resided in the 5,000-square-foot (460 m^{2}) Imperial Suite on the 30th floor. Years after his death, the suite was renamed as the Elvis Presley Suite. It was demolished in 1994 to make way for the Sky Villas.

Presley's manager, Colonel Tom Parker, lived at the Hilton for several years after Presley's death, and was a fixture at the hotel as an entertainment consultant for much of the remainder of his life.

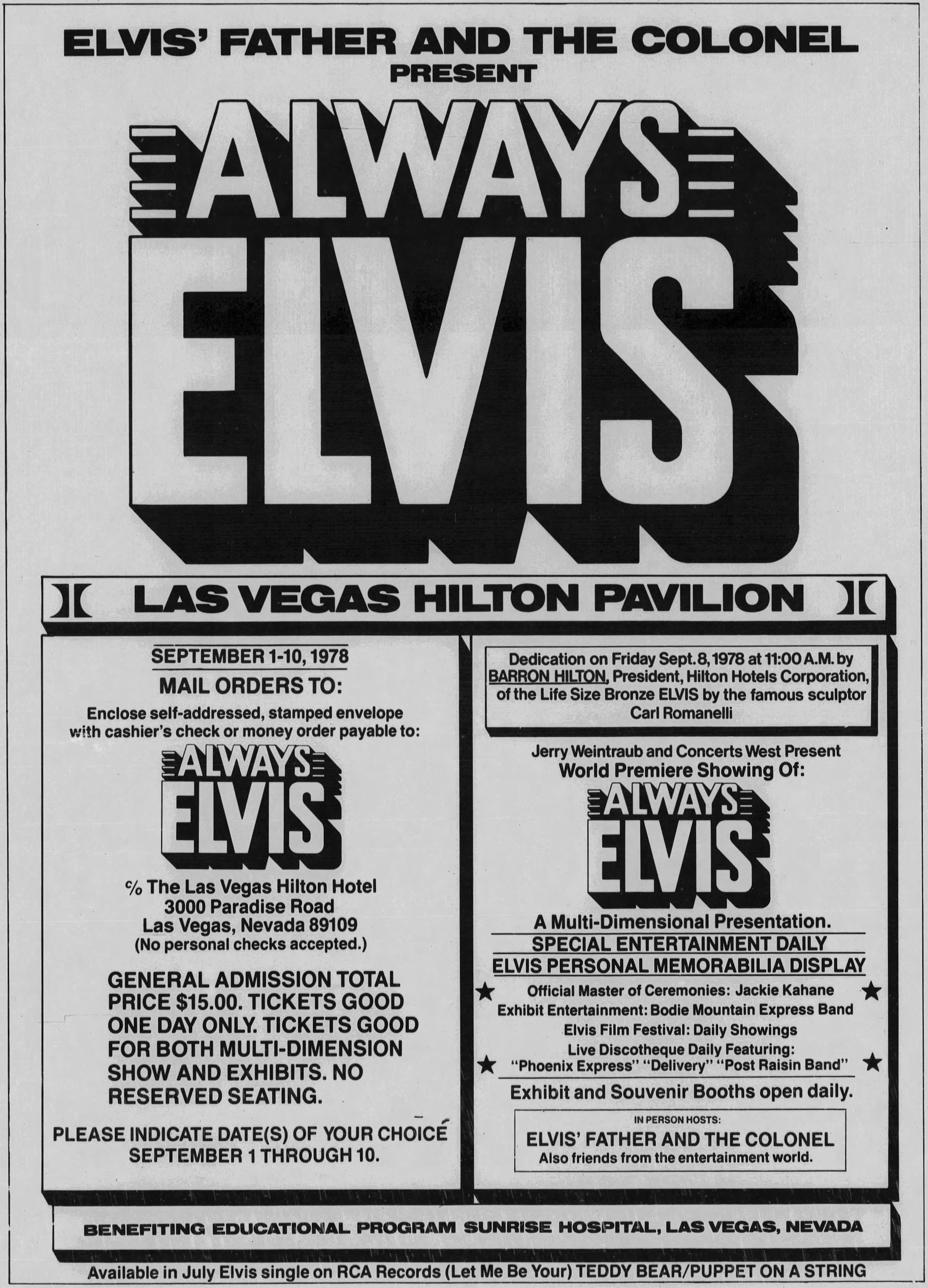
Advertisement for Always Elvis, a convention held in the Hilton Pavilion in 1978 for Presley's fans

The hotel has recognized and capitalized on Presley's legacy in assorted ways through the years. A year after his death, a bronze statue of Presley was unveiled at the hotel; it has since occupied various spots around the property. Various festivals and conventions for Elvis fans and impersonators have been held at the hotel.

Elvis: An American Musical, a multimedia production incorporating archival footage with live songs and re-enactments, premiered at the Hilton showroom in 1988, where it ran for two months before going on a national tour. Elvis impersonator Trent Carlini performed at the Hilton in various runs, both on the main stage and in the cabaret, from 2000 to 2004 and again from 2010 to 2015.

"Elvis: The Exhibition" opened at the Westgate in April 2015 in the former Star Trek attraction space. The exhibit, developed in association with Elvis Presley Enterprises, featured 28,000 square feet (2,600 m^{2}) of artifacts and memorabilia from the singer's life. In conjunction with the opening of the exhibit, the hotel's theater was renamed as the Elvis Presley International Showroom, and was set to feature rotating shows inspired by Presley, starting with The Elvis Experience. The show fared poorly in its two-month run, however, and the plans for further shows did not materialize. The exhibition closed suddenly in February 2016, leading to a protracted legal dispute.

In 2016, the Westgate successfully petitioned to rename the street leading from the hotel to Las Vegas Boulevard as Elvis Presley Boulevard.

== Popular culture ==
=== Television ===
- Ann-Margret – When You're Smiling, a 1973 NBC television special starring actress and singer Ann-Margret, was recorded mainly in the Hilton showroom.
- Perry Como, Las Vegas Style, a 1976 NBC special starring singer Perry Como, was recorded at the Hilton.
- The game show Let's Make a Deal filmed its 1976–77 season in the Hilton showroom.
- The Mrs. America Pageant was televised from the hotel annually from 1977 to 1983, in 1986, 1987, 1996, and 1997, from 2015 to 2019, and in 2021.
- Liberace recorded parts of two CBS specials, 1978's Leapin' Lizards, It's Liberace and 1979's Liberace – A Valentine's Special, and the 1980 Showtime special, Liberace in Las Vegas, at the Hilton.
- The CBS New Year's Eve special, Happy New Year, America, was anchored at the Hilton's Grand Ballroom in 1979 and 1980, and included segments at the Hilton in 1981 and 1982.
- In 1980, singer Lou Rawls starred in two specials recorded at the Hilton, An Evening with Lou Rawls on HBO and The Lou Rawls Parade of Stars on CBS.
- On May 2, 1982, the National Cable Television Association held its annual convention in the ballroom of the Hilton for the inaugural telecast of The Weather Channel.
- Wayne Newton Live in Concert, a 1989 pay-per-view special, was aired live from the Hilton showroom.
- Two episodes of Roseanne were taped here in 1991.
- Prime Time Country, a nightly talk show on The Nashville Network, came to the Hilton theater four times between 1997 and 1999, recording a week's worth of episodes on each occasion.
- The Oak Ridge Boys Live, a variety show starring country music group The Oak Ridge Boys that ran for one season on the Nashville Network, was taped over the span of two weeks in the Hilton Theatre in 1998.
- Penn & Teller's Sin City Spectacular, an FX variety show that ran for one season starting in 1998, recorded some of its episodes at the Hilton theater.
- Two live pay-per-view concert specials were televised from the Hilton theater under the name For the Record in 1998 and 1999, starring, respectively, Alabama and Merle Haggard.
- The syndicated game show Wheel of Fortune came to the Hilton four times, taping two or three weeks of episodes on each occasion. The show was aired from the Hilton Center in 1998, and from the theater in 1999, 2002, and 2005.
- The Mrs. World pageant was recorded at the Hilton in 2000, 2001, and 2003, to be aired on Pax TV.
- In 2001, the game show Jeopardy! taped two weeks of episodes in the Hilton theater, comprising one week of Celebrity Jeopardy! and one week of International Jeopardy!
- The Entertainer, a 2005 reality competition series on the E! network starring Wayne Newton, was set primarily at the Hilton, with contestants living in the Sky Villas.
- The 2006 PBS special Barry Manilow: Music and Passion was filmed during one of the singer's shows at the Hilton.
- World Series of Blackjack, a Game Show Network series, recorded its 2006 and 2007 seasons at the Hilton.
- Louis Theroux: Gambling in Las Vegas, a 2007 BBC documentary, was filmed mainly at the Hilton, where it follows several of the casino's regulars and employees.
- The 37th and 38th Daytime Emmy Awards ceremonies were held in the Hilton's theater in 2010 and 2011.
- The Pluribus episode "HDP" partially takes place in the Westgate resort complex.

=== Film ===
- The 1970 documentary Elvis: That's the Way It Is primarily covers several of Presley's concerts at the hotel.
- In the 1971 James Bond film Diamonds Are Forever, the hotel's exterior is depicted as the Whyte House casino.
- Over the Top, a 1987 Sylvester Stallone drama, depicts an arm wrestling tournament at the Hilton, incorporating footage from an actual tournament that was held there.
- The Hilton appears in the 1993 film Indecent Proposal as the hotel where Robert Redford stays and makes the titular proposition to Demi Moore.
- The 2022 Baz Luhrmann biographical film Elvis depicts Presley's residence and performances at the hotel.

== Sporting events ==
=== Boxing ===
The hotel has a history as a prominent professional boxing venue. In 1969, the showroom hosted the first major boxing match held at a Las Vegas hotel, Sonny Liston vs. Leotis Martin (previous fights had been held at the Convention Center). The Hilton Pavilion was the site in 1978 of Leon Spinks's victory over Muhammad Ali for the world heavyweight championship, which is remembered as one of the biggest upsets in the sport's history. The hotel then took a seven-year hiatus from hosting boxing matches.

In 1985, Donald Curry defeated Milton McCrory at the Hilton Center to unify and become the undisputed welterweight champion. The success of the Curry–McCrory fight led the Hilton to begin pursuing more major matches, to challenge Caesars Palace as the premier boxing venue in Las Vegas. The hotel struck a deal to host several fights in the heavyweight unification series, a tournament to establish an undisputed heavyweight champion. A 14,600-seat outdoor arena was temporarily erected in the Hilton's parking lot for some of the fights. The series culminated in Mike Tyson's defeat of Tony Tucker at the Hilton Center in 1987 to unify and become the undisputed champion.

By 1995, the Hilton had reportedly backed away from seeking to host the biggest fights, because of escalating costs. The hotel hosted no boxing matches between 2002 and 2008; since then, it has occasionally hosted minor fights.

=== Other sports ===
The Hilton Pavilion hosted two nationally televised tennis events in 1978: the WCT Tournament of Champions and the World Team Tennis All-Star Match.

The hotel was the venue for Evo 2014, a major competitive video gaming tournament.

Westgate has hosted billiard tournaments from the three major North American billiard organizations for several years: Valley National 8-Ball League Association, American Poolplayers Association, and CueSports International (beginning in 2026).

== Gallery ==
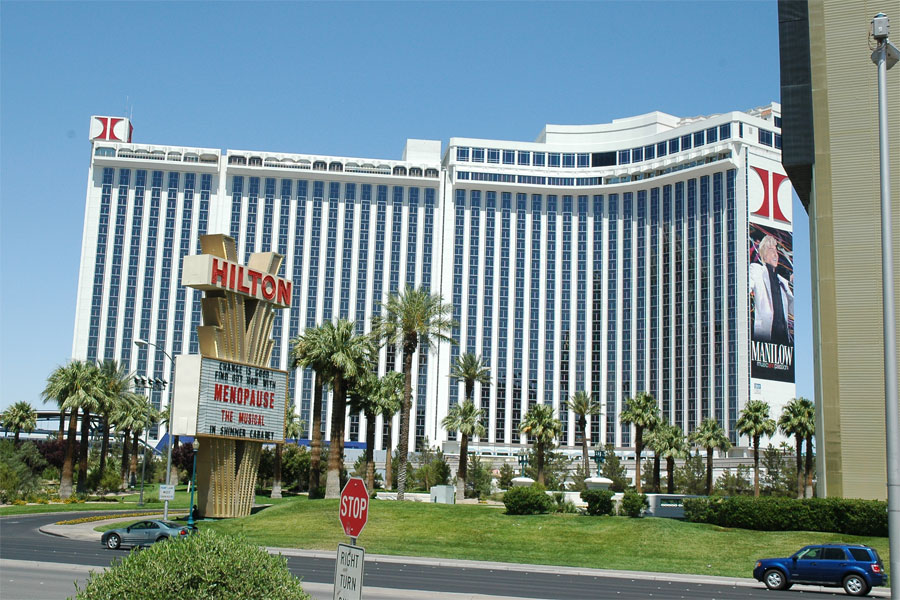

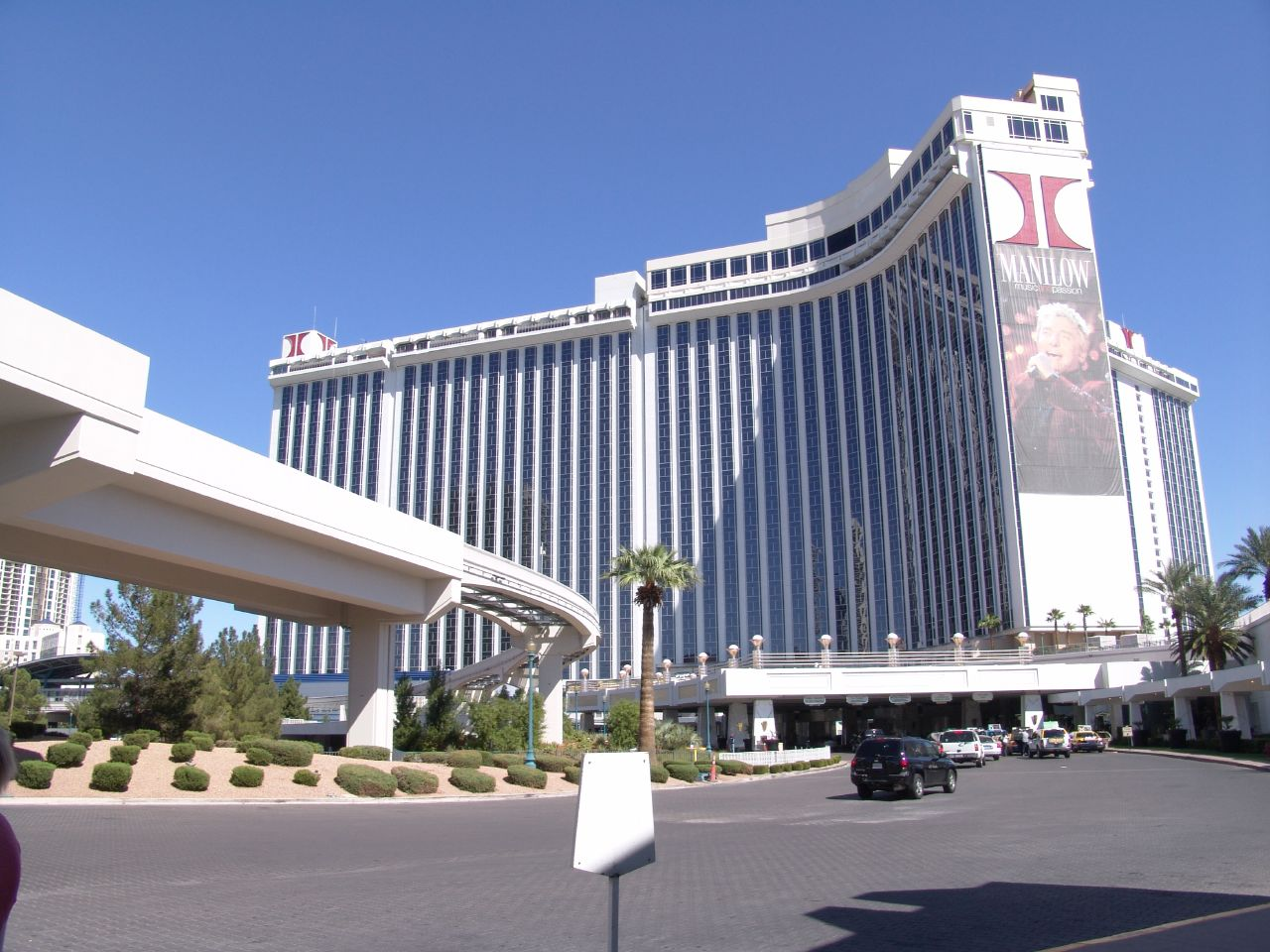
As seen in 2006

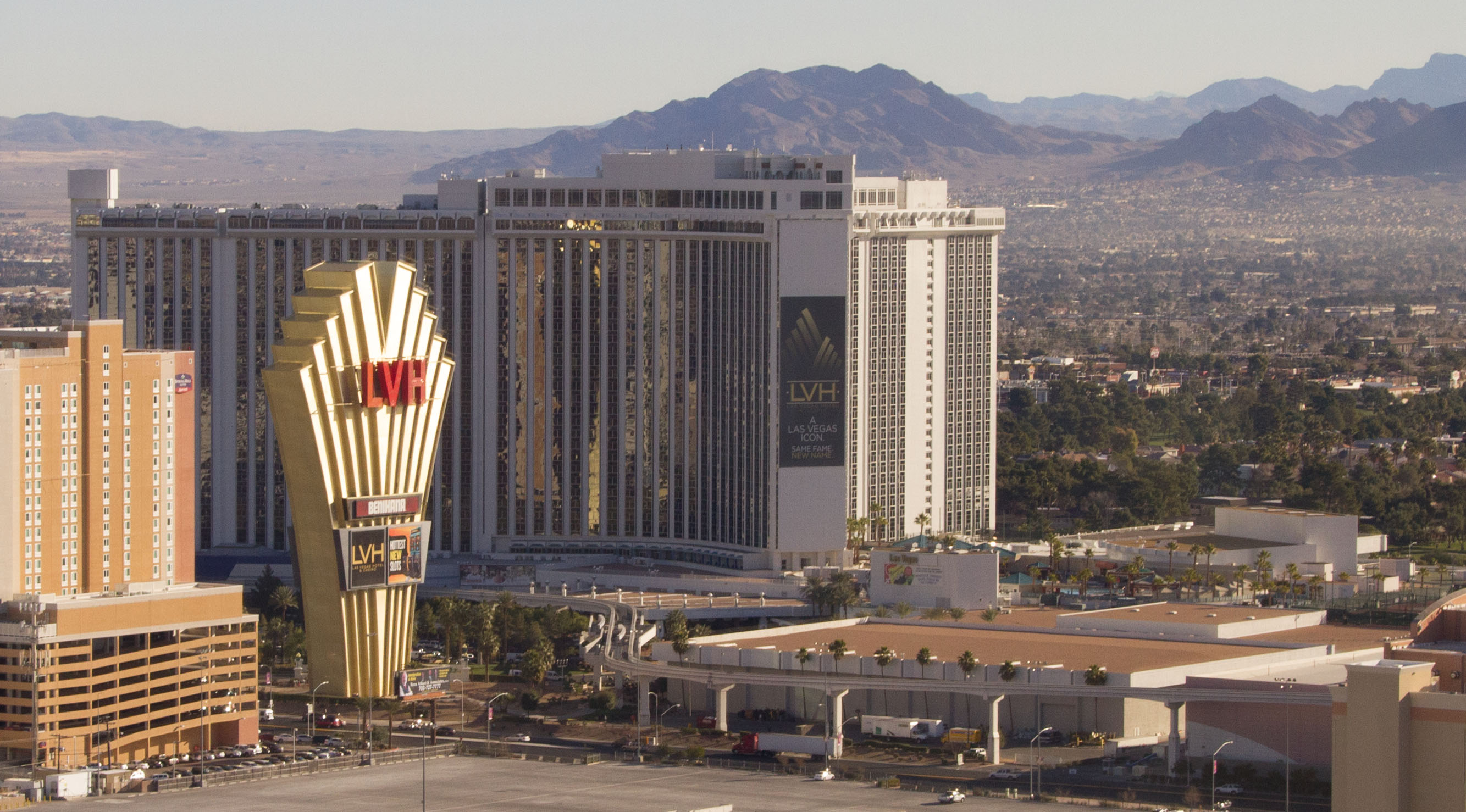
As seen in 2013

== See also ==
- List of integrated resorts
