= 2018 Nevada State Treasurer election =

- November 6, 2018
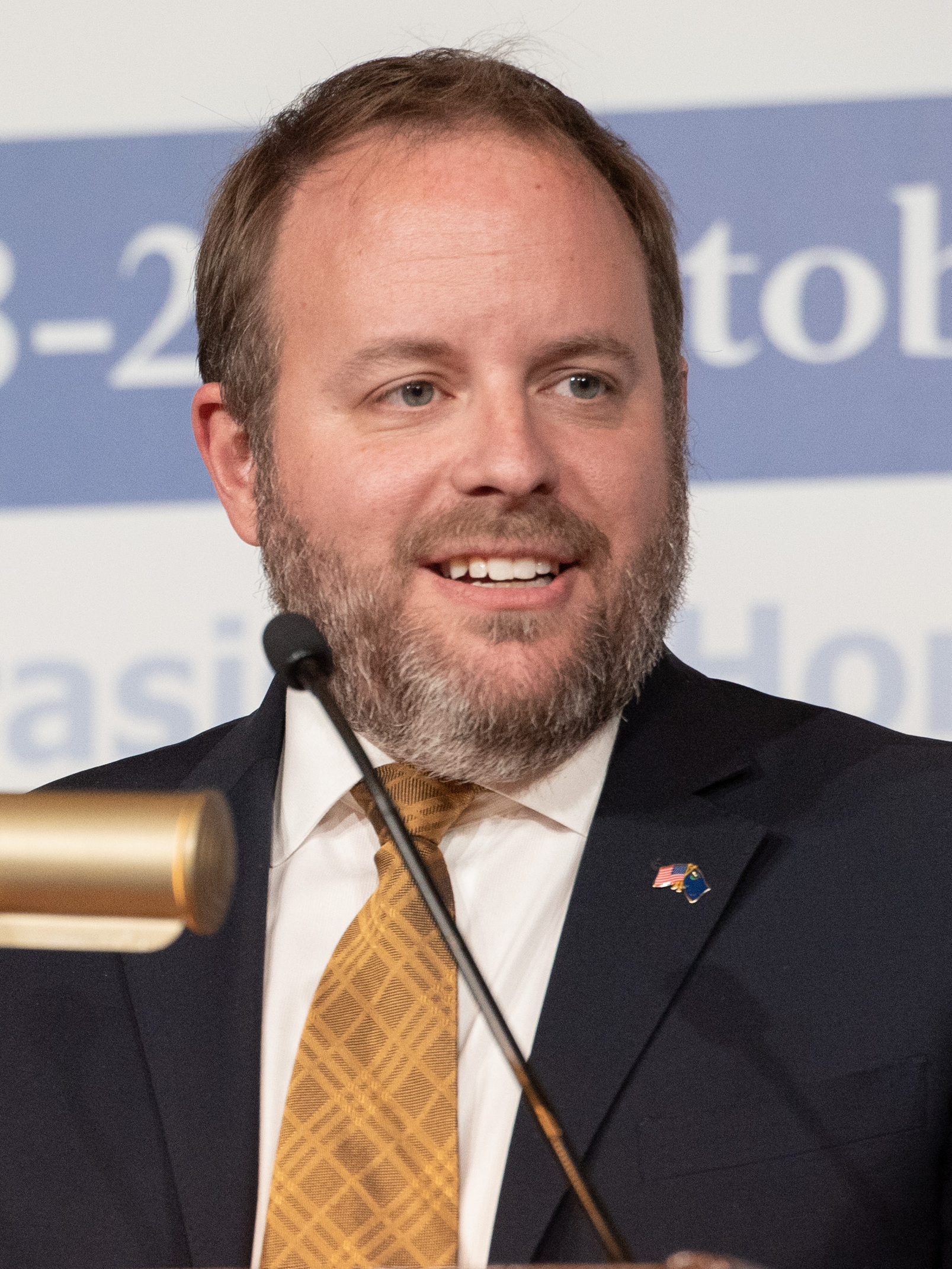

Nominee	Zach Conine	Bob Beers
Party	Democratic	Republican
Popular vote	459,874	453,748
Percentage	47.70%	47.06%
- Conine: 40–50% 50–60% 60–70% Beers: 40–50% 50–60% 60–70% 70–80% 80–90%
State Treasurer before election
Dan Schwartz
Republican
Elected State Treasurer
Zach Conine
Democratic

The 2018 Nevada State Treasurer election was held on November 6, 2018, to elect the Nevada State Treasurer, concurrently with elections to the United States Senate, U.S. House of Representatives, governor, and other state and local elections. Primary elections were held on June 12, 2018.

Incumbent Republican state treasurer Dan Schwartz was eligible to run for re-election to a second term in office, but instead ran unsuccessfully for governor. Democratic businessman Zach Conine defeated former Republican state legislator and Las Vegas city councilman Bob Beers in the general election.

== Republican primary ==
=== Candidates ===
==== Nominee ====
- Bob Beers, former member of the Las Vegas City Council from Ward 2 (2012–2017), state senator from the 6th district (2002–2008), and state assemblyman from the 4th district (1998–2004)

==== Eliminated in primary ====
- Derek Uehara, financial planner and candidate for Henderson city council in 2015

==== Declined ====
- Dan Schwartz, incumbent state treasurer (2015–present)

=== Results ===
Republican primary results
Party	Candidate	Votes	%
Republican	Bob Beers	91,570	66.82
Republican	Derek Uehrara	32,412	23.65
None of These Candidates		13,066	9.53
Total votes		137,048	100.00

== Democratic primary ==
Businessman Zach Conine was the only candidate for the Democratic primary ballot in 2018, so he automatically became the Democratic nominee.

=== Candidates ===
==== Nominee ====
- Zach Conine, businessman and candidate for Nevada Assembly in 2016

==== Withdrew before primary ====
- Andrew Martin, state assemblyman from the 9th district (2013–2015) and nominee for state controller in 2014

==== Declined ====
- Teresa Benitez-Thompson, majority leader of the Nevada Assembly (2016–present) and state assemblywoman from the 27th district (2010–present)
- Irene Bustamante Adams, speaker pro tempore of the Nevada Assembly (2017–present) and state assemblywoman from the 42nd district (2010–present)

== General election ==
=== Endorsements ===
Bob Beers (R)

Newspapers and other media

- Las Vegas Review-Journal
Zach Conine (D)

U.S. senators

- Harry Reid, former Senate Majority Leader (2007–2015), former United States Senator from Nevada (1987–2017), and U.S. representative from Nevada's 1st congressional district (1983–1987)

U.S. representatives

- Dina Titus, U.S. representative from Nevada's 1st congressional district (2013–present) and 3rd district (2009–2011)

Statewide officials

- Kate Marshall, former state treasurer (2007–2015), nominee for Nevada's 2nd congressional district in 2011 and nominee for lieutenant governor in 2018

Newspapers and other media

- Las Vegas Sun

=== Results ===
2018 Nevada State Treasurer election
Party	Candidate	Votes	%
Democratic	Zach Conine	459,874	47.70
Republican	Bob Beers	453,748	47.06
None of These Candidates		27,431	2.84
Independent American	Bill Hoge	23,146	2.40
Total votes		964,199	100.00
Democratic gain from Republican			

==== By congressional district ====
Conine won two of four congressional districts. Beers won the remaining two, including one that elected a Democrat.

District	Beers	Conine	Representative
1st	34%	61%	Dina Titus
2nd	54%	40%	Mark Amodei
3rd	48.0%	47.4%	Susie Lee
4th	46%	49%	Steven Horsford
