= Bob Beers (politician, born 1959) =

American politician

Member of the Las Vegas City Council from the 2nd ward
- In office April 4, 2012 – July 19, 2017
- Preceded by: Steven Wolfson
- Succeeded by: Steve Seroka

Member of the Nevada Senate from the 6th district
- In office 2004–2008
- Preceded by: Ray Rawson
- Succeeded by: Allison Copening

Member of the Nevada Assembly from the 4th district
- In office 1998–2004
- Preceded by: Deanna Braunlin
- Succeeded by: Frances Allen

Personal details
- Born: October 14, 1959 (age 67) Livermore, California, U.S.
- Party: Democratic (Before 1989); Republican (1989–present)
- Spouse: Sarah Beers
- Education: University of Nevada, Las Vegas (BS)

Robert T. Beers (born October 14, 1959) is an American accountant (CPA) and member of the Republican Party. He was previously an elected member of the Nevada Assembly from 1998 to 2004, the Nevada Senate from 2005 to 2008, and the Las Vegas City Council from 2012 to 2017. He ran unsuccessfully for the Republican nomination for Governor of Nevada in 2006. In January 2014, he announced that he would run against Democratic Senator Harry Reid in the 2016 U.S. Senate election, but he withdrew from the race in June 2015. In 2018, he was defeated for Nevada State Treasurer by Zach Conine.

== Early and personal life ==
Beers was born in 1959 in Livermore, California. His family moved to Las Vegas when he was 11 years old. He graduated from Ed W. Clark High School with high honors in 1977 and from the University of Nevada, Las Vegas with distinction with a Bachelor of Science in Business Administration degree in 1987.

His community activities have included volunteer treasurer for several organizations, including the Old Spanish Trail Association, Southern Nevada Clean Communities, Tonopah Historic Mining Park Foundation, and the Nevada Republican Party. He has also been president of the Las Vegas Chamber of Commerce Business Expo and President-elect for the Las Vegas Chamber of Commerce Business Council. As a volunteer, he has created or maintained websites for over a dozen community organizations.

== Professional career ==
From 1980-1986, Beers worked for radio broadcasting companies in Reno, Nevada and Las Vegas as News Director. In 1982, while working at KMJJ 1140 AM, he won "Best Miniseries" and "Best Newscast" awards from the Associated Press in the AP's Medium Market California-Nevada-Hawaii division.

From 1987-1989, Beers worked at an accounting firm called Laventhol & Horwath. Beers became a Certified Public Accountant (CPA) in 1989, the same year he founded Las Vegas computer accounting firm Wilson, Beers & Alu. In 2002, he sold Wilson, Beers, & Alu to a large local CPA firm. From 2004 to 2007, Beers was the marketing director for an HR outsourcing firm. In 2009, he started an auditing firm called Seale and Beers, CPAs. He managed this firm until 2012. He currently consults business owners on their treasuries.

== Political career ==
In 1998, Beers was elected to represent District 4 in the Nevada Assembly, the lower house of Nevada's Legislature. He served in three regular and two special sessions. He was assigned to the Ways & Means; Commerce & Labor; and Elections, Procedures & Ethics committees of the Assembly.

In 2003, Beers led a group of legislators in opposition to Governor Kenny Guinn's tax increases, citing concerns that they might damage Nevada's economy. After several special sessions, Beers' voting bloc failed and the tax increases were passed. The following year, Beers was elected to the Nevada Senate, defeating 20-year incumbent Republican Ray Rawson who had supported the increases.

Beers served in the Nevada Senate for the 2005 and 2007 Legislative sessions. He served as vice-chairman of the Senate Finance Committee, and was also a member of the Committee on Natural Resources and the Committee on Legislative Operations.

In 2006, Beers and his supporters gathered over 150,000 signatures to put a Taxpayer Bill of Rights amendment (called TASC for Tax And Spend Control) on the November 2006 general election ballot, which proposed that increases in spending greater than the sum of inflation and population growth require an affirmative vote of citizens.

He ran for Governor of Nevada in the 2006 election, but finished second in the Republican primary, behind U.S. Representative Jim Gibbons, who would go on to win the general election.

In 2008, Beers was defeated for re-election to the Nevada Senate by Democrat Allison Copening. Beers sued for defamation, and the Nevada Democratic Party settled out of court in 2010. He held no further public office until 2012 when Beers was elected to the non-partisan Las Vegas City Council in a nine-way special election to fill the vacant seat of Councilman Steve Wolfson, who had been appointed Clark County District Attorney. He was elected to a full four-year term the next year.

Beers declared in January 2014 that he was running for the Republican nomination for U.S. Senator to challenge Senator Harry Reid in the 2016 election but he withdrew in June 2015.

Beers lost reelection to the Las Vegas City Council in 2017, finishing first in the May 1 primary contest but losing the June 27 runoff to Steve Seroka, with Seroka winning 3,979 votes to Beers' 3,387 votes. The next year, Beers ran for Nevada State Treasurer in the 2018 elections but lost to Democrat Zach Conine.

In 2022, Beers ran again for Las Vegas City Council, but lost to Francis Allen-Palenske, with Allen-Palenske winning 19,894 votes to Beers' 17,969 votes.
