= Mark Hutchison =

American politician (born 1963)

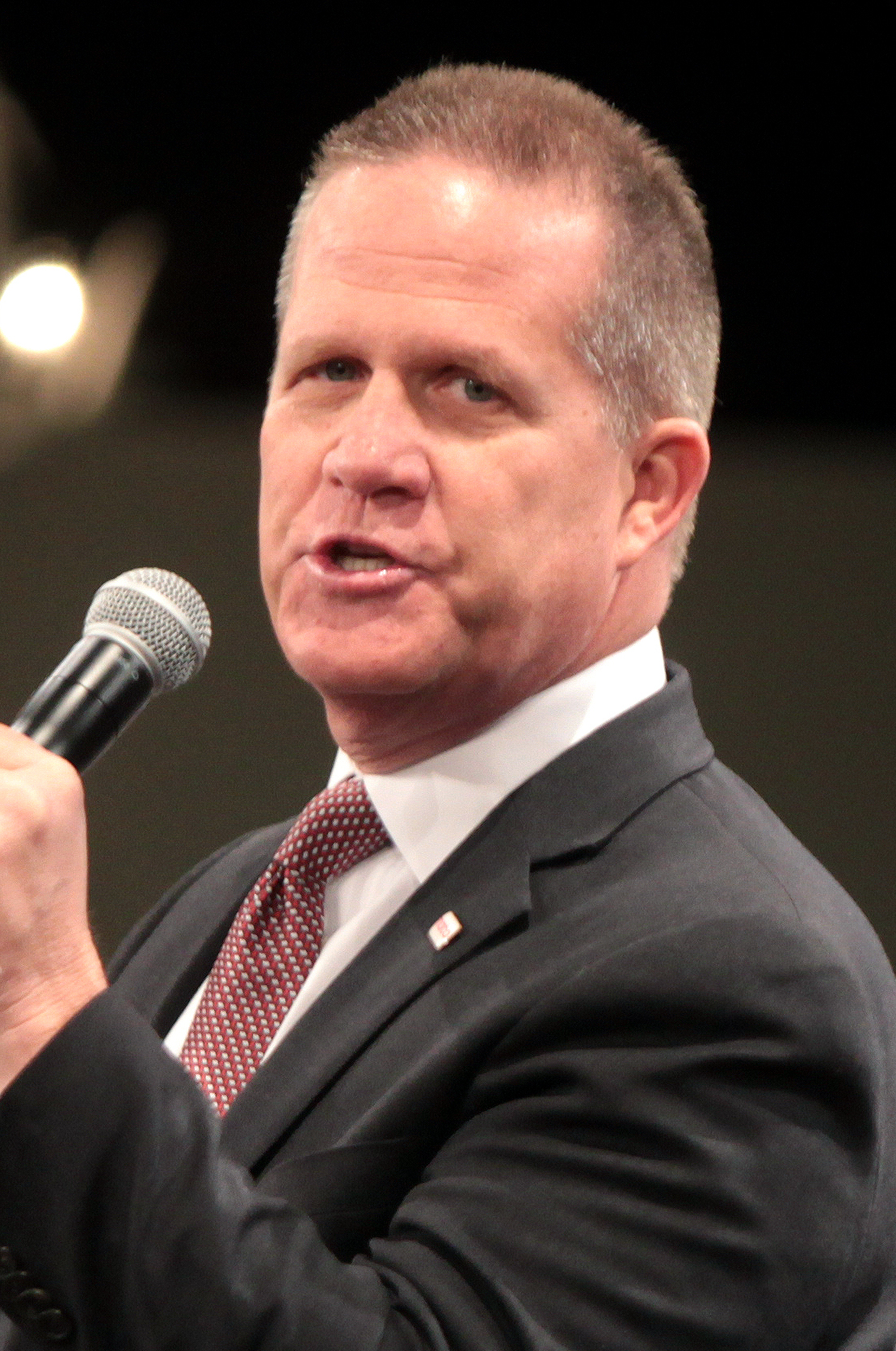
- Hutchison in 2016

34th Lieutenant Governor of Nevada
- In office January 5, 2015 – January 7, 2019
- Governor: Brian Sandoval
- Preceded by: Brian Krolicki
- Succeeded by: Kate Marshall

Member of the Nevada Senate from the 6th district
- In office February 4, 2013 – December 1, 2014
- Preceded by: Allison Copening
- Succeeded by: Mark Lipparelli

Personal details
- Born: Mark Alan Hutchison; May 5, 1963 (age 63) Las Vegas, Nevada, US
- Party: Republican
- Spouse: Cary Hutchison
- Children: 6
- Education: University of Nevada, Las Vegas (BS); Brigham Young University (JD)
- Website: Official website

Mark Alan Hutchison (born May 5, 1963) is an American attorney and politician. A member of the Republican Party, he served as the 34th lieutenant governor of Nevada from 2015 to 2019. From 2013 to 2014, he served as a senator in the Nevada Senate representing the 6th Senate district, which encompasses a large part of Las Vegas including much of Summerlin. As a state senator, Hutchison served on the Senate Judiciary Committee, as well as the Commerce, Labor and Energy Committee.

Hutchison was sworn into office as lieutenant governor on January 4, 2015, for a four-year term, which ended January 7, 2019. During the 2014 election, he defeated Democratic candidate Lucy Flores. He also served as the chairman of the Nevada Commission on Tourism, vice-chairman of the Nevada Board of Transportation, a member of the Nevada Board of Economic Development, and a member of the Nevada Commission on Homeland Security and the chairman of its Subcommittee on Cyber Security.

Hutchinson served as the chairman for Joe Lombardo's campaign during the 2022 gubernatorial campaign.

== Early life and education ==
Hutchison was born in Las Vegas, Nevada, in 1963. He graduated from Bonanza High School in 1981and University of Nevada, Las Vegas, graduating in 1987 with a Bachelor of Science in business administration. Hutchison received his Juris Doctor degree in 1990 from J. Reuben Clark Law School at Brigham Young University, where he joined the Order of the Coif and served as an editor of the law review.

== Law career ==
Following law school, Hutchison clerked for Kenneth F. Ripple of the United States Court of Appeals for the Seventh Circuit located in Chicago. After his clerkship, he practiced for the national law firm of Kirkland & Ellis in both Chicago and Los Angeles. Hutchison is currently licensed to practice law in Nevada and California. In addition, he is a member of several federal and state bars, including the U.S. Supreme Court Bar.

In 1996, Hutchison founded the law firm of Hutchison & Steffen with his friend and colleague, John T. Steffen. Hutchison's primary practice areas are business and complex tort litigation, constitutional litigation and professional liability defense.

== State Senate ==
Hutchison was elected to a four-year term in the Nevada State Senate in 2012, representing District 6 in Las Vegas, Nevada, which encompasses the Northwest part of the Las Vegas Valley, including portions of the communities of Summerlin, Desert Shores and Sun City. During the 77th session of the Nevada Legislative, Hutchison served on the Senate Judiciary Committee and the Senate Commerce, Labor and Energy Committee.

In 2014, the Las Vegas Sun reported that Hutchinson failed to disclose a $15,000 all-expenses-paid trip to Israel in 2013, hosted by the American Israel Education Foundation, the educational arm of the American Israel Public Affairs Committee.

== Personal ==
Hutchison lives in Las Vegas with his wife, Cary. They have six children (Whitney, Canton, Kelsey, Weston, Logan, and Sophie) and four grandchildren. He is an active member of the Church of Jesus Christ of Latter-day Saints. In January 2022 it was announced that he would be serving as Virginia Richmond mission president for this church beginning July 2022.

== Electoral history ==
=== State Senate (6th District) ===
==== 2012 ====
Party	Candidate	Votes	Percentage
Republican	Mark Hutchison	27,449	50.83%
Democratic	Benny Yerushalmi	26,598	49.17%

=== Lieutenant governor ===
Republican primary results, 2014
Party	Candidate	Votes	%
Republican	Mark Hutchison	62,939	53.76
Republican	Sue Lowden	42,290	36.13
Republican	Chris Dyer	6,824	5.83
None of These Candidates	None of These Candidates	5,011	4.28
Total votes		117,064	100

Nevada lieutenant gubernatorial election, 2014
Party	Candidate	Votes	%	±%
Republican	Mark Hutchison	324,628	59.48	+8.18
Democratic	Lucy Flores	183,598	33.64	−8.26
Independent American	Mike Little	21,232	3.89	+0.19
None of These Candidates	None of These Candidates	16,309	2.99	−0.11
Total votes		545,767	100	
Republican hold		Swing	+16.45	

Political offices
Preceded by Brian Krolicki	Lieutenant Governor of Nevada; 2015–2019	Succeeded by Kate Marshall
Party political offices
Preceded by Brian Krolicki	Republican nominee for Lieutenant Governor of Nevada; 2014	Succeeded by Michael Roberson
