= Robert Lee Stinson case =

American man wrongfully convicted of murder

Robert Lee Stinson
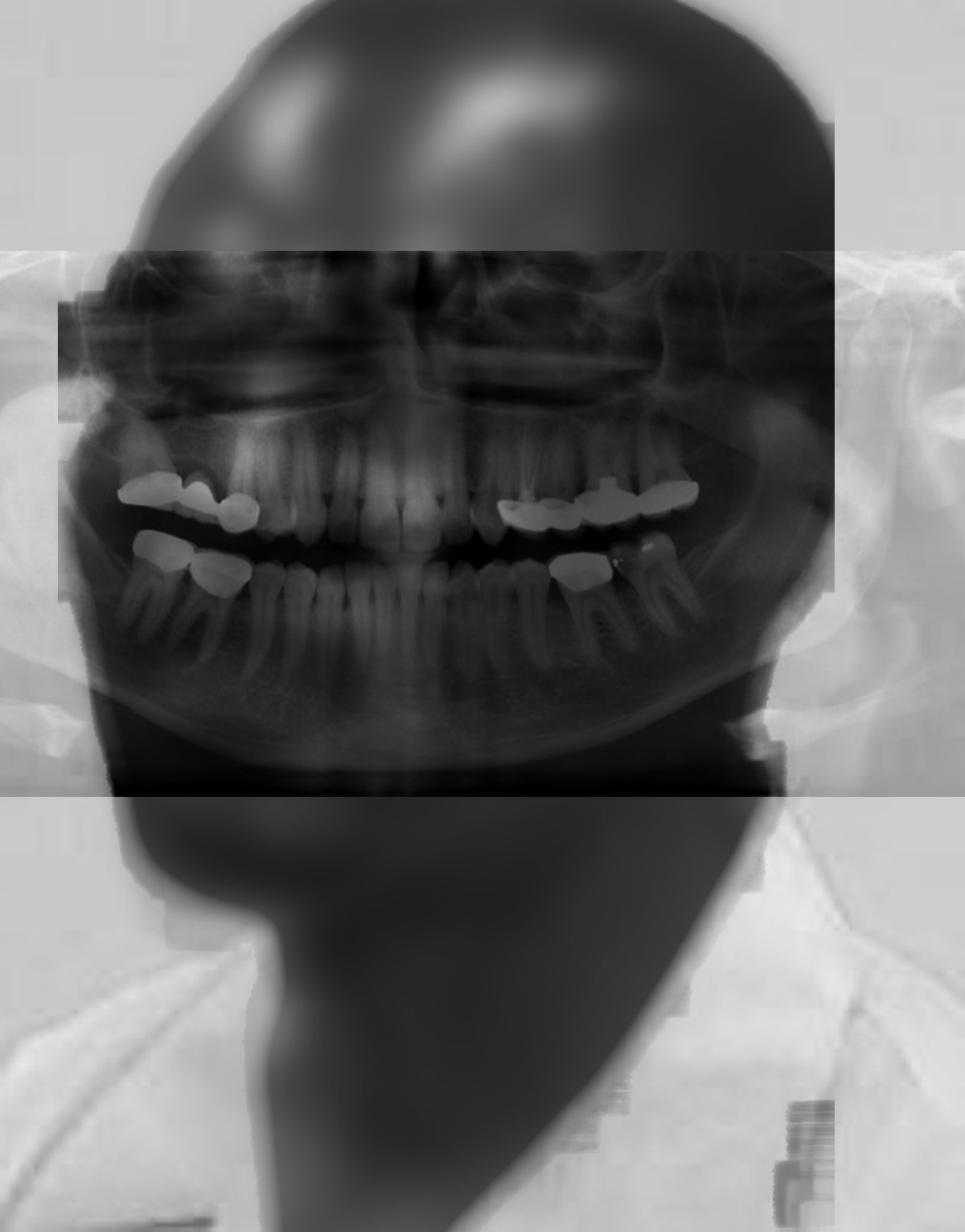
- Dental overlay over Stinson
- Born: August 13, 1964 (age 62)
- Known for: Exonerated of crime due to reevaluated DNA evidence and faulty bite mark testimony
- Status: Exonerated in 2009
- Criminal charges: Charged with the murder of Ione Cychosz 1985

Robert Lee Stinson is an innocent Wisconsin man who was charged with the rape and murder of a 63-year-old woman, Ione Cychosz. Cychosz’ body was discovered in a vacant lot close to Stinson's backyard. Bite marks that were left on the body were analyzed by Lowell T. Johnson, a forensic dentist, who advised that the bites were left by someone missing their front tooth. Due to Robert Lee Stinson's proximity and Johnson's testimony, which was later analyzed by Raymond Rawson (both members of the American Board of Forensic Odontology), he was sentenced to life in prison.

In 2005, the Wisconsin Innocence Project took up Stinson's case and alleged that the forensic evidence was faulty, and DNA evidence was reassessed that ruled out Stinson's involvement. Finally, on July 27, 2009, Robert Lee Stinson was exonerated of Ione Cychosz's murder after serving over 23 years in prison. Later the same year, he began a lawsuit against James Gauger, the lead investigator on the case, Lowell T. John and Raymond Rawson. Robert Lee Stinson's case is one of many that led to the continued push to discredit forensic evidence deemed admissible and relevant at the time of trial.

Stinson filed a federal civil rights lawsuit, which he settled with the city of Milwaukee for $7.5 million in 2019. In April 2012, Moses Price, Jr. was charged and sentenced with the murder of Ione Cychosz after DNA evidence linked him to the crime. Price was in prison serving a 35-year sentence for homicide when the DNA evidence was found and received another 19 years incarceration.

== The 1985 case ==
On the morning of November 3, 1984, a passerby discovered the body of Ione Cychosz, she had been beaten, raped and stabbed. There were no eyewitnesses or motives that police could identify in relation to the murder. Bite marks that were left on the body were subsequently examined by Lowell T. Johnson, who asserted that they must have been left by an attacker missing a front tooth. After interviewing Robert Lee Stinson due to his proximity to the scene, investigators noticed his missing front tooth and arrested and charged him for murder.

Stinson's legal team attempted to exclude the bite mark evidence from the case, however, trial Judge Janine Geske denied this request and stated ‘there are adequate standards and controls in the area of forensic odontology… (And it is) a recognized area of science’. Johnson's testimony was backed up by fellow forensic odontologist, Raymond Rawson who stated, ‘there was no question that there was a match to reasonable scientific certainty’.

Finally on 12 December 1985, Robert Lee Stinson was convicted for the murder of Ione Cychosz and sentenced to life in prison.

== Exoneration ==
Robert Lee Stinson appealed the court's decision, arguing that the bite mark evidence is inadmissible; however, the Wisconsin judicial system upheld the previous conviction.

Throughout his 23 years in jail, Robert Lee Stinson refused to admit any guilt, and was subsequently never granted parole, which requires an acceptance of guilt, and acknowledgment of the crimes committed.

In 2005, The Wisconsin Innocence Project took up Robert Lee Stinson's case; following a letter written from Stinson while in jail. Alleging that the forensic evidence was faulty, DNA evidence was reassessed and conclusively ruled out any involvement of Robert Lee Stinson in the murder. Milwaukee County District Attorney's office overturned Stinson's conviction and he was released on the 30th January 2009. All charges were dropped formally on 27 July 2009.

The new DNA evidence sought by the Innocence project also showed links to a Moses Price Jr. who at the time was serving a 35-year sentence for a 1991 murder of a man in Milwaukee. In May 2009, Moses Price Jr. signed a confession for his murder of Ione Cychosz.

== Subsequent appeals ==
The first appeal launched by Robert Lee Stinson was in 1986 following the conviction. The appeal cited 4 main issues with the case; that the court erred in allowing expert testimony on bite mark identification, the sufficiency of the evidence to support the jury verdict, the limits on the counsel's closing argument and the denial of Stinson's request to change counsel.

Firstly the defense argued that the scientific knowledge of bite mark identification was ‘not sufficiently developed to allow a reasonable opinion to be asserted by an expert’. The court upheld the previous decision citing expert witness as an important aid to a jury in processing and understanding evidence. In allowing the evidence into trial, therefore, ‘the evidence was sufficient to convince a reasonable jury beyond a reasonable doubt that Stinson was guilty’.

Stinson also argued that the trial court limited his counsels closing argument by not allowing a statement from an article that had been submitted and accepted into evidence. The statement in question ‘referred to the disagreement among experts as to the admissibility and reliability of bite mark evidence’. The appeals court again ruled in the previous court's decision by saying that it would ‘unduly confuse the issues and confuse the jury’. At the time 19 jurisdictions accepted bite mark evidence. The court did note that ‘without the admission of the bite mark evidence, the state’s case against Stinson may not have been sufficient’.

After his case had been picked up by the innocence project and Stinson had been released, he launched a new lawsuit in 2015 against James Gauger, Lowell T. Johnson and Raymond Rawson. Stinson again lost the lawsuit as the court stated that while Drs. Johnson and Rawson had been negligent in asserting that the bite marks belonged definitively to Stinson, their opinions while unreasonable were ‘by an error in forensic analysis, not a due-process violation’, Drs. Johnson and Rawson were entitled to qualified immunity. Stinson would have to prove that the expert testimony was wrong ‘and that the expert knew it was wrong at the time he gave it’ thus fabricating evidence.

In August 2017, the full U.S 7th Circuit Court of Appeals overturned the previous decision in a 6-4 decision and stated that Stinson did have grounds to sue Gauger, Johnson, and Rawson. Michael Bowers, Stinson's odontological expert in the case argued the methods used in the 1985 case ‘were flawed and did not comport with the accepted standards of practice in… forensic odontology at the time’. Thus he stated, ‘Johnson and Rawson knowingly manipulated the bite mark evidence… to match’.

The court also looked into the fact that James Gauger had interviewed Stinson previously in relation to the murder of a man named Ricky Johnson, 2 years prior to the death of Ione Cychosz, for which Stinson was not charged. In his 2010 book The Memo Book, James Gauger stated that he still believed Stinson had been involved and wrote ‘lots of people get away with murder… because we had the right guys, but couldn’t prove it’.

The court ruled that Johnson and Rawson were not ‘entitled to absolute immunity’ and could legally be sued by Stinson. Robert Lee Stinson's lawsuit was settled with the city of Milwaukee in 2019 for $7.5 million. Stinson previously received $25,000 from the state of Wisconsin, as well as an additional $90,000 in 2014 after legislation was passed to award him more than the maximum allowed under the Wisconsin compensation law.

== Issues with forensic dentistry and bite mark analysis ==
The case came at a time when forensic sciences were still relatively new in the court system and was the first example of it being used in a case in the state of Wisconsin. Stinson's case was subsequently used in conjunction with multiple other cases setting the precedent for the inclusion of bite mark forensics.

The first time it had been used was in 1975, the People v Marx, which in turn was cited by many succeeding, cases, despite the court in this case ‘conceding there was no official science behind it’. The dentists in the Marx case went to great lengths to explain that in many other cases this type of bite mark comparison would not be valid but ‘this case, they felt, was a rare exception to the general rule’. Its inclusion in the case however led to what can be called a ‘judicial echo chamber’ as other cases cite it.

Following this bite mark comparison and analysis began to be more commonly used in legal cases. Notably, the field would become more ‘legitimized’ when it was used in the 1979 Ted Bundy's case. Lowell Levine, the bite mark analyst, in this case, wrote ‘that a bite mark match is as good as a fingerprint’. Lowell Levine went on to provide analysis on many cases including the wrongful arrest of Edmund Burke 20 years later due to his testimony.

Judge Janine Geske at the time was working within the requirement set that evidence be ‘relevant and helpful’, however in 1993, the Daubert Standard would be introduced that added that expert testimony be from an established scientific field with approved methods of testing.

Robert Lee Stinson's case highlights issues with bite-mark comparison. One issue is that the sketch that was originally drawn by Johnson was inconsistent with the missing tooth that Robert Lee Stinson had, but he would later change his testimony once investigators had brought Stinson in. The second sketch used in the trial was drawn by a police sketch artist who was told by Johnson ‘that a tooth in the upper quadrant was missing’, but did not specify which tooth. Stinson drew attention to this in his 2015 lawsuit against the two doctors, when Johnson first said the murderer was ‘missing the right lateral incisor’ not the ‘right central incisor’ that Stinson was missing.

While the 2015 lawsuit upheld the protection of the doctors due to ‘qualified immunity’, by this point the study had already begun to be discredited. One judge on the validity of Johnson and Rawson's ‘immunity’ stated ‘the very quackery of the field protects its practitioners from liability… akin to saying that an astrologer has falsified his conclusions’. Johnson and Rawson, at the time of the 1985 case had been leading exponents of bite mark analysis, both were members of the American Bureau of Forensic Odontology, and Rawson himself had provided testimony in many cases including the 1992 trial against Ray Krone who was sentenced as guilty and put on death row; partly due to forensic testimony. Ray Krone would later be exonerated by DNA evidence after serving 10 years in prison.

In 2009, a committee on identifying the needs of the Forensic Science community pointed to the fact ‘that many forensic tests – such as those used to infer the source of… bite marks – have never been exposed to stringent scientific scrutiny’, as these fields had developed alongside law enforcement not as a scientific discipline. The paper also highlights the role of the examiner and their potential for bias in ‘evaluating a specific bite mark in cases in which the police agencies provide the suspects for comparison’, such as the Robert Lee Stinson case with Johnson.

The committee posited the biggest issues to bite mark analysis and comparison (not to be confused with other disciplines in the field such as dental identification of human remains) was the accuracy of human skin in registering bite marks, the uniqueness of human teeth, the techniques used in the field and the examiner's bias. A 2016 study also stated that the forensic field had ‘outrun empirical testing of those claims’ and that the testing in that particular study, rather than confirming the validity had ‘confirmed that the foundations of bite mark identifications are unsound’. In 2017, another paper stated that the issue lay rather with the confusion between bite mark analysis and bite mark comparison, arguing that bite mark analysis could lead to important information and ‘analysis has nothing to do with comparing or matching anything to a suspect’.

The American Board of Forensic Odontology has been facing increasing scrutiny as groups such as the Innocence Project has taken on ‘at least 25 wrongful… convictions due to erroneous bite mark analysis’. However, some still see value in the science and argue that the complete removal of all bite mark analysis would be an error ‘equivalent to the proverbial throwing the baby out with the bathwater’.
