= Allison Copening =

American politician (1964–2020)

Member of the Nevada Senate from the 6th district
- In office 2009–2013
- Preceded by: Bob Beers
- Succeeded by: Mark Hutchison

Personal details
- Born: Allison Mellot; July 4, 1964 Las Vegas, Nevada, U.S.
- Died: January 18, 2020 (aged 55) Las Vegas, Nevada, U.S.
- Party: Democratic
- Education: University of Nevada, Las Vegas (BA)
- Occupation: Businesswoman

Debra Allison Copening (née Mellot; July 4, 1964 – January 18, 2020) was a Democratic member of the Nevada Senate, representing Clark County District 6 (map) from 2009 to 13, defeating incumbent Bob Beers in 2008. She did not run for re-election in 2012.

== Early life ==
Allison Copening was born in Las Vegas. She graduated from Bonanza High School in 1982, and also attended the University of Nevada, Las Vegas where she graduated with a B.A. in Communication Studies.

Her parents were Harold and Jane Mellot; Copening had one older brother, Michael and one older sister, Gina.

== Career ==
Copening started her career in the field of broadcasting for nine years at the CBS affiliate in Las Vegas, KLAS TV.

== Personal life ==
Copening fought with breast cancer since 2005. She died on January 18, 2020, after a brief illness at the age of 55.
