= Mark Lipparelli =

American politician

Mark Lipparelli is an American politician who is a former member of the Nevada Senate, representing District 6. Lipparelli is a Republican. He was appointed to the seat by the Clark County Commission after Mark Hutchison was elected as Lieutenant Governor of Nevada in 2014. He did not run for election in 2016 and was succeeded by Nicole Cannizzaro.

Lipparelli formerly served as Chairman of the Nevada Gaming Control Board.
