= Zach Conine =

American politician (born 1981)

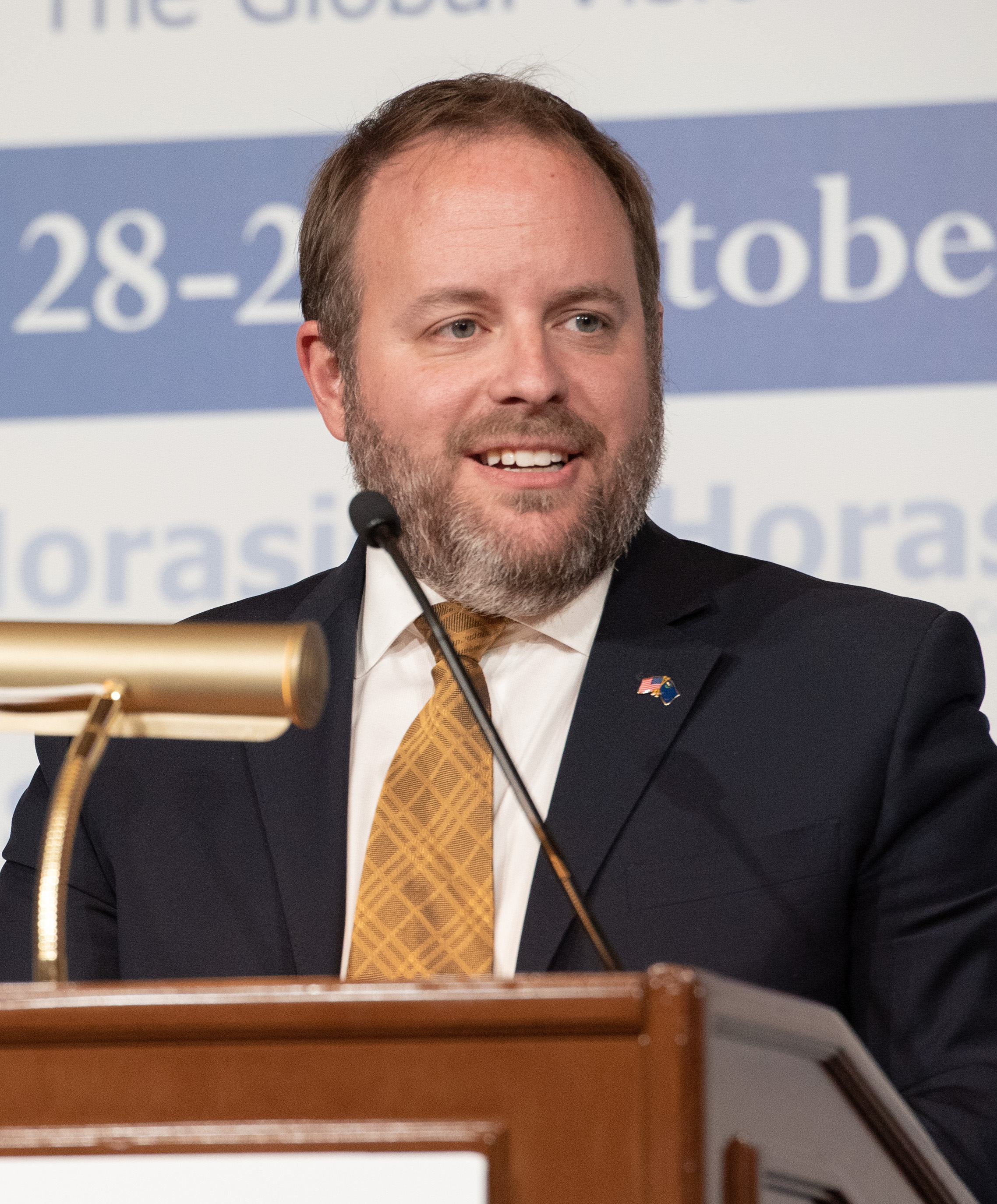
- Conine in 2019

23rd Treasurer of Nevada
- Incumbent
- Assumed office January 7, 2019
- Governor: Steve Sisolak; Joe Lombardo
- Preceded by: Dan Schwartz

Personal details
- Born: Zachary Beare Conine; October 20, 1981 (age 45)
- Party: Democratic
- Education: Cornell University (BS); University of Nevada, Las Vegas (JD)

Zachary Beare Conine (Note: Pronounced /ˈkoʊnaɪn/ COH-nyne.) (born October 20, 1981) is an American attorney, businessman, and politician who has served as the 23rd Treasurer of the U.S. state of Nevada since 2019. A member of the Democratic Party, he announced his campaign for Nevada attorney general in the 2026 election.

== Early life and career ==
Zachary Beare Conine was born October 20, 1981, and raised in upstate New York. He graduated from Cornell University in 2003, earning a bachelor's degree in hospitality management, after which he moved to Nevada. While working in gaming and finance, he was featured in the 2004 Fox reality series The Casino. He attended the William S. Boyd School of Law at the University of Nevada, Las Vegas at night and became a licensed attorney in 2015.

Conine ran for the District 34 seat in the Nevada Assembly in the 2016 elections, but lost in the Democratic Party primary election to Shannon Bilbray-Axelrod.

== Nevada State Treasurer ==
In 2018, Conine ran a campaign to become the Nevada State Treasurer. He narrowly won the general election, defeating Republican Bob Beers. Conine ran for reelection in 2022 and defeated Michele Fiore, the Republican nominee, in a close race.

Between 2019 and 2024, Conine and the Treasurer's Office returned $236 million of unclaimed property to Nevadans, more than any previous administration. As of 2024, over $1 billion in unclaimed property remain for the state government to return.

Following the Robb Elementary School shooting in 2022, Conine announced that Nevada would divest itself from $89 million in investments in firearms manufacturers.

== Personal life ==
Conine's wife, Layke, is an attorney serving as the executive director of the Nevada Cannabis Association. They have three children.

== Notes ==
Political offices
Preceded by Dan Schwartz	Treasurer of Nevada; 2019–present	Incumbent
