= Ray Rawson =

American politician (born 1940)

Member of the Nevada State Senate for the 6th district
- In office November 1984 – November 2004

Personal details
- Born: November 2, 1940 (age 85) Sandy, Utah, United States
- Party: Republican
- Profession: dentist, professor

Raymond D. Rawson is a former State Senator within the State of Nevada, serving from 1985 to 2001. He is known for providing forensic evidence that led to the wrongful imprisonment of Ray Krone and Robert Lee Stinson.

Rawson was born in Utah and attended the University of Nevada, Las Vegas and Loma Linda University Dental School. He is a dentist and a visiting professor of General Practice Residency at the University of Nevada, Las Vegas School of Dental Medicine, where he teaches a course in forensic dentistry.
