= 2020 United States ballot measures =

- March 3 to December 5, 2020

Part of the 2020 United States elections

A total of 129 ballot measures were placed on statewide ballots in 2020 across the United States while an additional three ballot measures (one each) were placed on the ballots of the District of Columbia, Puerto Rico, and the U.S. Virgin Islands.

- Three were balloted on March 3, one each in Alabama, California and Maine
- One was balloted in Wisconsin on April 7
- One measure was balloted in Oklahoma on June 30
- Two measures were balloted in Maine on July 14
- One measure was balloted in Missouri on August 4
- 116 ballot measures were balloted on November 3.

Turnout for ballot measures in several states may have been affected by state and local government responses to the COVID-19 pandemic, including public health measures and electoral accommodations enacted by state governments.

== By state ==
=== Alabama ===
Origin	Status	Measure	Description (Result of a "yes" vote)	Date	Yes	No
Legislature	Failed	Alabama Amendment 1, Appointed Education Board Amendment	Amend the Alabama Constitution to rename the State Board of Education as the Alabama Commission on Elementary and Secondary Education and change the board from being elected by voters to being appointed by the governor and confirmed by the Senate.	Mar 3	277,320; 24.88%	837,234; 64.19%
Legislature	Approved	Alabama Amendment 1, Citizenship Requirement for Voting Measure	Amend the Alabama Constitution to state that “only a citizen” of the U.S. who is 18 years old or older can vote in Alabama.	Nov 3	1,535,862; 77.01%	458,487; 22.99%
Legislature	Failed	Alabama Amendment 2, Judicial System Restructuring Measure	Revise multiple sections of the state constitution concerning the state judiciary, including removing the authority of the Chief Justice of the Alabama Supreme Court to hire the administrative director of courts and giving that authority to the Alabama Supreme Court as a whole.	Nov 3	881,145; 48.94%	919,380; 51.06%
Legislature	Approved	Alabama Amendment 3, Judicial Vacancies Measure	Amend the Alabama Constitution to provide that a judge, other than a probate judge, appointed to fill a vacancy would serve an initial term until the first Monday after the second Tuesday in January following the next general election after the judge has completed two years in office (rather than one year).	Nov 3	1,193,532; 64.84%	647,305; 35.16%
Legislature	Approved	Alabama Amendment 4, Authorize Legislature to Recompile the State Constitution Measure	Authorize the state legislature to recompile the Alabama Constitution during the 2022 regular state legislative session and provide for its ratification.	Nov 3	1,222,682; 66.82%	607,090; 33.18%
Legislature	Approved	Alabama Amendment 5, "Stand Your Ground" Rights in Franklin County Churches Measure	Amend the Alabama Constitution to state that individuals have a right to stand their ground and may use deadly force in self-defense or in defense of another person in churches within Franklin county.	Nov 3	1,213,544; 71.61%	481,088; 28.39%
Legislature	Approved	Alabama Amendment 6, "Stand Your Ground" Rights in Lauderdale County Churches Measure	Amend the Alabama Constitution to state that individuals have a right to stand their ground and may use deadly force in self-defense or in defense of another person in churches within Lauderdale county.	Nov 3	1,216,008; 71.61%	482,189; 28.39%

=== Alaska ===
Origin	Status	Measure	Description (Result of a "yes" vote)	Date	Yes	No
Citizens	Failed	Alaska Ballot Measure 1, North Slope Oil Production Tax Increase Initiative	Increase taxes on oil production fields that (a) are located above 68 degrees north latitude in Alaska, which is an area known as the North Slope, (b) have a lifetime output of at least 400 million barrels of oil; and (c) had an output of at least 40,000 barrels per day in the preceding calendar year.	Nov 3	145,392; 42.14%	199,667; 57.86%
Citizens	Approved	Alaska Ballot Measure 2, Top-Four Ranked-Choice Voting and Campaign Finance Laws Initiative	Make changes to Alaska's election policies, including: requiring persons and entities that contribute more than $2,000 that were themselves derived from donations, contributions, dues, or gifts to disclose the true sources (as defined in law) of the political contributions; replacing partisan primaries with open top-four primaries for state executive, state legislative, and congressional offices; and establishing ranked-choice voting for general elections, including the presidential election, in which voters would rank the candidates.	Nov 3	174,032; 50.55%	170,251; 49.45%

=== Arizona ===
Origin	Status	Measure	Description (Result of a "yes" vote)	Date	Yes	No
Citizens	Approved	Arizona Proposition 207, Marijuana Legalization Initiative	Legalize the possession and use of marijuana for persons who are at least 21 years old, enact a tax on marijuana sales, and require the state Department of Health and Human Services to develop rules to regulate marijuana businesses.	Nov 3	1,956,440; 60.03%	1,302,458; 39.97%
Citizens	Approved	Arizona Proposition 208, Tax on Incomes Exceeding $250,000 for Teacher Salaries and Schools Initiative	Enact a 3.50% income tax, in addition to the existing income tax (4.50% in 2020), on income above $250,000 (single filing) or $500,000 (joint filing) and distribute the revenue from the 3.50% income tax to teacher and classroom support staff salaries, teacher mentoring and retention programs, career and technical education programs, and the Arizona Teachers Academy.	Nov 3	1,675,810; 51.75%	1,562,639; 48.25%

=== Arkansas ===
Origin	Status	Measure	Description (Result of a "yes" vote)	Date	Yes	No
Legislature	Approved	Arkansas Issue 1, Transportation Sales Tax Continuation Amendment	Continue a 0.5% sales tax, with revenue dedicated to state and local highways, roads, and bridges, that would otherwise expire in 2023.	Nov 3	660,018; 55.33%	532,915; 44.67%
Legislature	Approved	Arkansas Issue 2, Change State Legislative Term Limits Amendment	Impose term limits of twelve consecutive years for state legislators with the opportunity to return after a four-year break.	Nov 3	647,861; 55.38%	521,979; 44.62%
Legislature	Failed	Arkansas Issue 3, Initiative Process and Legislative Referral Requirements Amendment	Change requirements for citizen initiatives and legislative referrals, including: requiring citizen-initiated ballot measure campaigns to collect signatures from at least 45 (of 75) counties, an increase from 15 counties; moving the signature deadline for ballot initiatives from 4 months before the general election to January 15; eliminating the signature cure period of 30 days; and requiring a 60% vote for the Legislature to refer a constitutional amendment to the ballot.	Nov 3	503,028; 44.07%	638,319; 55.93%

=== California ===
Origin	Status	Measure	Description (Result of a "yes" vote)	Date	Yes	No
Bond Issue	Failed	California Proposition 13, School and College Facilities Bond	Authorize $15 billion in general obligation bonds for school and college facilities, including $9 billion for preschool and K-12 schools, $4 billion for universities, and $2 billion for community colleges.	Mar 3	4,304,013; 46.99%	4,856,154; 53.01%
Citizens	Approved	California Proposition 14, Stem Cell Research Institute Bond Initiative	Issue $5.5 billion in general obligation bonds for the state's stem cell research institute and making changes to the institute's governance structure and programs.	Nov 3	8,588,618; 51.09%	8,222,154; 48.91%
Citizens	Failed	California Proposition 15, Tax on Commercial and Industrial Properties for Education and Local Government Funding Initiative	Require commercial and industrial properties, except those zoned as commercial agriculture, to be taxed based on their market value, rather than their purchase price.	Nov 3	8,213,054; 48.03%	8,885,569; 51.97%
Legislature	Failed	California Proposition 16, Repeal Proposition 209 Affirmative Action Amendment	Repeal Proposition 209, which stated that the government and public institutions cannot discriminate against or grant preferential treatment to persons on the basis of race, sex, color, ethnicity, or national origin in public employment, public education, and public contracting.	Nov 3	7,217,064; 42.77%	9,655,595; 57.23%
Legislature	Approved	California Proposition 17, Voting Rights Restoration for Persons on Parole Amendment	Allow people on parole for felony convictions to vote.	Nov 3	9,985,568; 58.55%	7,069,173; 41.45%
Legislature	Failed	California Proposition 18, Primary Voting for 17-Year-Olds Amendment	Allow 17-year-olds who will be 18 at the time of the next general election to vote in primary elections and special elections.	Nov 3	7,514,317; 43.96%	9,577,807; 56.04%
Legislature	Approved	California Proposition 19, Property Tax Transfers, Exemptions, and Revenue for Wildfire Agencies and Counties Amendment	Allow eligible homeowners to transfer their tax assessments anywhere within the state and allow tax assessments to be transferred to a more expensive home with an upward adjustment; increase the number of times that persons over 55 years old or with severe disabilities can transfer their tax assessments from one to three; require that inherited homes that are not used as principal residences, such as second homes or rentals, be reassessed at market value when transferred; and allocate additional revenue or net savings resulting from the ballot measure to wildfire agencies and counties.	Nov 3	8,545,818; 51.11%	8,176,105; 48.89%
Citizens	Failed	California Proposition 20, Criminal Sentencing, Parole, and DNA Collection Initiative	Add crimes to the list of violent felonies for which early parole is restricted; recategorize certain types of theft and fraud crimes as wobblers (chargeable as misdemeanors or felonies); and require DNA collection for certain misdemeanors.	Nov 3	6,385,839; 38.28%	10,294,058; 61.72%
Citizens	Failed	California Proposition 21, Local Rent Control Initiative	Allow local governments to enact rent control on housing that was first occupied over 15 years ago, with an exception for landlords who own no more than two homes with distinct titles or subdivided interests.	Nov 3	6,771,298; 40.15%	10,095,206; 59.85%
Citizens	Approved	California Proposition 22, App-Based Drivers as Contractors and Labor Policies Initiative	Define app-based transportation (rideshare) and delivery drivers as independent contractors and adopt labor and wage policies specific to app-based drivers and companies.	Nov 3	9,958,425; 58.63%	7,027,820; 41.37%
Citizens	Failed	California Proposition 23, Dialysis Clinic Requirements Initiative	Require chronic dialysis clinics to have an on-site physician while patients are being treated; report data on dialysis-related infections; obtain consent from the state health department before closing a clinic; and not discriminate against patients based on the source of payment for care.	Nov 3	6,161,457; 36.58%	10,681,171; 63.42%
Citizens	Approved	California Proposition 24, Consumer Personal Information Law and Agency Initiative	Expand the state’s consumer data privacy laws, including provisions to allow consumers to direct businesses to not share their personal information; remove the time period in which businesses can fix violations before being penalized; and create the Privacy Protection Agency to enforce the state’s consumer data privacy laws.	Nov 3	9,384,625; 56.23%	7,305,431; 43.77%
Veto Referendum	Failed	California Proposition 25, Replace Cash Bail with Risk Assessments Referendum	Uphold the contested legislation, Senate Bill 10 (SB 10), which would have replaced cash bail with risk assessments for detained suspects awaiting trials.	Nov 3	7,232,380; 43.59%	9,358,226; 56.41%

=== Colorado ===
Origin	Status	Measure	Description (Result of a "yes" vote)	Date	Yes	No
Legislature	Approved	Colorado Amendment B, Gallagher Amendment Repeal and Property Tax Assessment Rates Measure	Repeal the Gallagher Amendment, which set residential and non-residential property tax assessment rates in the state constitution; allow the Colorado State Legislature to freeze property tax assessment rates at the current rates (7.15% for residential property and 29% for non-residential property); allow the state legislature to provide for future property tax assessment rate decreases through state law; and continue to require voter approval for rate increases due to TABOR.	Nov 3	1,740,395; 57.52%	1,285,136; 42.48%
Legislature	Failed	Colorado Amendment C, Charitable Bingo and Raffles Amendment	Amend the state constitution to lower the number of years an organization must have existed before obtaining a charitable gaming license from five years to three years and to allow charitable organizations to hire managers and operators of gaming activities so long as they are not paid more than the minimum wage.	Nov 3	1,586,973; 52.35%	1,444,553; 47.65%
Citizens	Approved	Colorado Amendment 76, Citizenship Requirement for Voting Initiative	Amend the Colorado Constitution to state that “only a citizen” of the U.S. who is 18 years of age or older can vote in Colorado.	Nov 3	1,985,239; 62.90%	1,171,137; 37.10%
Citizens	Approved	Colorado Amendment 77, Allow Voters in Central, Black Hawk, and Cripple Creek Cities to Expand Authorized Games and Increase Maximum Bets Initiative	Allow voters in Central, Black Hawk, and Cripple Creek Cities — the only towns where gaming is legal in Colorado — to approve a maximum single bet limit of any amount and expand allowable game types in addition to slot machines, blackjack, poker, roulette, and craps.	Nov 3	1,854,153; 60.54%	1,208,414; 39.46%
Legislature	Approved	Colorado Proposition EE, Tobacco and E-Cigarette Tax Increase for Health and Education Programs Measure	Create a tax on nicotine products such as e-cigarettes, increasing cigarette and tobacco taxes, setting minimum cigarette prices, and dedicating revenues to various health and education programs.	Nov 3	2,134,608; 67.56%	1,025,182; 32.44%
Veto Referendum	Approved	Colorado Proposition 113, National Popular Vote Interstate Compact Referendum	Join the National Popular Vote Interstate Compact, which would give the state’s nine electoral votes to the presidential candidate who wins the national popular vote if states representing at least 270 Electoral College votes adopt the compact.	Nov 3	1,644,716; 52.33%	1,498,500; 47.67%
Citizens	Approved	Colorado Proposition 114, Gray Wolf Reintroduction Initiative	Require the Colorado Parks and Wildlife Commission to create a plan to reintroduce and manage gray wolves on designated lands west of the continental divide by the end of 2023.	Nov 3	1,590,299; 50.91%	1,533,313; 49.09%
Legislature	Failed	Colorado Proposition 115, 22-Week Abortion Ban Initiative	Prohibit abortions in Colorado after a fetus reaches 22-weeks gestational age as calculated from the first day of the woman's last menstrual period.	Nov 3	1,292,787; 41.01%	1,859,479; 58.99%
Citizens	Approved	Colorado Proposition 116, Decrease Income Tax Rate from 4.63% to 4.55% Initiative	Decrease the state income tax rate from 4.63% to 4.55% for individuals, estates, trusts, and foreign and domestic C corporations operating in Colorado.	Nov 3	1,821,702; 57.86%	1,327,025; 42.14%
Citizens	Approved	Colorado Proposition 117, Require Voter Approval of Certain New Enterprises Exempt from TABOR Initiative	Require statewide voter approval of new state enterprises if the enterprise's projected or actual revenue from fees and surcharges is greater than $100 million within its first five years.	Nov 3	1,573,114; 52.55%	1,420,445; 47.45%
Citizens	Approved	Colorado Proposition 118, Paid Medical and Family Leave Initiative	Establish a paid family and medical leave program in Colorado to provide 12 weeks (up to 16 weeks in certain cases) of paid leave (with a maximum benefit of $1,100 per week) funded through a payroll tax to be paid for by employers and employees in a 50/50 split.	Nov 3	1,804,546; 57.75%	1,320,386; 42.25%

=== Florida ===
Origin	Status	Measure	Description (Result of a "yes" vote)	Date	Yes	No
Citizens	Approved	Florida Amendment 1, Citizen Requirement for Voting Initiative	Continue a 0.5% sales tax, with revenue dedicated to state and local highways, roads, and bridges, that would otherwise expire in 2023.	Nov 3	8,307,109; 79.29%	2,169,684; 20.71%
Citizens	Approved	Florida Amendment 2, $15 Minimum Wage Initiative	Increase the state's minimum wage incrementally until reaching $15 per hour in September 2026.	Nov 3	6,391,753; 60.82%	4,117,815; 39.18%
Citizens	Failed	Florida Amendment 3, Top-Two Open Primaries for State Offices Initiative	Establish a top-two open primary system for primary elections for state legislators, the governor, and cabinet (attorney general, chief financial officer, and commissioner of agriculture) in Florida.	Nov 3	5,854,468; 57.03%	4,410,768; 42.97%
Citizens	Failed	Florida Amendment 4, Require Constitutional Amendments to be Passed Twice Initiative	Require voter-approved constitutional amendments to be approved by voters at a second general election to become effective.	Nov 3	4,853,402; 47.53%	5,356,792; 52.47%
Legislature	Approved	Florida Amendment 5, Extend "Save Our Homes" Portability Period Amendment	extending the period during which a person may transfer Save Our Homes benefits to a new homestead property from two years to three years.	Nov 3	7,484,104; 74.49%	2,562,387; 25.51%
Legislature	Approved	Florida Amendment 6, Homestead Property Tax Discount for Spouses of Deceased Veterans Amendment	Allow a homestead property tax discount to be transferred to the surviving spouse of a deceased veteran.	Nov 3	9,305,503; 89.73%	1,065,308; 10.27%

=== Georgia ===
Origin	Status	Measure	Description (Result of a "yes" vote)	Date	Yes	No
Legislature	Approved	Georgia Amendment 1, Dedicating Tax and Fee Revenue Amendment	Authorize the Georgia Legislature to dedicate tax or fee revenue to the public purpose for which the taxes or fees were imposed.	Nov 3	3,862,568; 81.62%	869,540; 18.38%
Legislature	Approved	Georgia Amendment 2, Allow Residents to Seek Declaratory Relief from Certain Laws Amendment	Waive the state's sovereign immunity and allow residents to seek declaratory relief from state or local laws that violate the Constitution of Georgia, the U.S. Constitution, or state law.	Nov 3	3,491,296; 74.46%	1,197,792; 25.54%
Legislature	Approved	Georgia Referendum A, Property Tax Exemption for Certain Charities Measure	Exempt from property taxes property owned by a 501(c)(3) public charity if the property is owned exclusively for the purpose of building or repairing single-family homes and the charity provides interest-free financing to the individual(s) purchasing the home.	Nov 3	3,451,116; 73.09%	1,270,737; 26.91%

=== Idaho ===
Origin	Status	Measure	Description (Result of a "yes" vote)	Date	Yes	No
Legislature	Approved	Idaho Constitutional Amendment HJR4, Require 35 Legislative Districts Amendment	Remove language in the state constitution that allows the legislature to have between 30 and 35 legislative districts and instead requiring the legislature to consist of 35 districts.	Nov 3	525,779; 67.95%	247,966; 32.05%

=== Illinois ===
Origin	Status	Measure	Description (Result of a "yes" vote)	Date	Yes	No
Legislature	Failed	Illinois Allow for Graduated Income Tax Amendment	Repeal the state's constitutional requirement that the state personal income tax be a flat rate and instead allow the state to enact legislation for a graduated income tax.	Nov 3	2,683,490; 46.73%	3,059,411; 53.27%

=== Iowa ===
Origin	Status	Measure	Description (Result of a "yes" vote)	Date	Yes	No
Automatic Ballot Referral	Failed	Iowa Constitutional Convention Question	Hold a constitutional convention to explore proposals for changes to the state constitution.	Nov 3	408,746; 29.58%	972,930; 70.42%

=== Kentucky ===
Origin	Status	Measure	Description (Result of a "yes" vote)	Date	Yes	No
Legislature	Approved	Kentucky Constitutional Amendment 1, Marsy's Law Crime Victims Rights Amendment	Add specific rights of crime victims, together known as Marsy's Law, to the Kentucky Constitution.	Nov 3	1,156,883; 63.36%	668,866; 36.64%
Legislature	Failed	Kentucky Constitutional Amendment 2, Terms of Judicial Offices Amendment	Increase the office terms of commonwealth's attorneys from six years to eight years starting in 2030; increase the office terms of district judges from four years to eight years starting in 2022; and change attorney licensing requirements for district judges from two years to eight years beginning in 2022.	Nov 3	574,585; 30.99%	1,279,394; 69.01%

=== Louisiana ===
Origin	Status	Measure	Description (Result of a "yes" vote)	Date	Yes	No
Legislature	Approved	Louisiana Amendment 1, No Right to Abortion in Constitution Amendment	Add language to the Louisiana Constitution stating that "nothing in this constitution shall be construed to secure or protect a right to abortion or require the funding of abortion."	Nov 3	1,274,167; 62.06%	779,005; 37.94%
Legislature	Approved	Louisiana Amendment 2, Include Oil and Gas Value in Tax Assessment of Wells Amendment	Allow the presence or production of oil or gas to be taken into account when determining the fair market value of an oil or gas well for ad valorem taxes.	Nov 3	1,158,766; 58.34%	827,516; 41.66%
Legislature	Approved	Louisiana Amendment 3, Use of Budget Stabilization Fund for Declared Disasters Amendment	Amend the state constitution to allow the Louisiana State Legislature, through a two-thirds vote in each chamber, to use up to one-third of the revenue in the Budget Stabilization Fund (also known as the Rainy Day Fund) to cover the state's costs associated with a federally-declared disaster.	Nov 3	1,097,196; 55.34%	885,304; 44.66%
Legislature	Failed	Louisiana Amendment 4, Expenditures Limit Growth Formula Amendment	Amend the state constitution to remove the existing expenditure limit formula and allow the Louisiana Legislature to enact a state spending limit formula through statute that does not allow more than 5 percent growth per year.	Nov 3	856,559; 44.24%	1,079,618; 56.76%
Legislature	Failed	Louisiana Amendment 5, Payments in Lieu of Property Taxes Option Amendment	Amend the state constitution to authorize local governments to enter into a cooperative endeavor agreement with new or expanding manufacturing establishments and allowing the manufacturing establishments to make payments to the taxing authority instead of paying property taxes.	Nov 3	727,372; 37.33%	1,221,254; 62.67%
Legislature	Approved	Louisiana Amendment 6, Homestead Exemption Special Assessment Income Limit Amendment	Amend the state constitution to increase the income threshold to qualify for the special assessment level for residential property owned by seniors and certain military and disabled persons from $50,000 (adjusted annually for inflation since 2001) to $100,000 per year beginning in 2026 (adjusted annually for inflation).	Nov 3	1,225,682; 62.16%	746,021; 37.84%
Legislature	Approved	Louisiana Amendment 7, Unclaimed Property Permanent Trust Fund Amendment	Amend the state constitution to create the Unclaimed Property (UCP) Permanent Trust Fund, with the fund earmarked for payment of claims made by owners of abandoned property; allocate funds above administrative costs received due to the Uniform Unclaimed Property Act of 1997 (or its successor) to the UCP Permanent Trust Fund until equal to the state's estimated unclaimed property potential liability; allocate any additional unclaimed property receipts and any investment revenue from the UCP Permanent Trust Fund to the state's general fund; and authorize the treasurer to invest up to 50% of the UCP Permanent Trust Fund in equities.	Nov 3	1,267,414; 64.32%	702,930; 35.68%
Legislature	Failed	Louisiana Amendment 1, Allow for Out-of-State Members to the University Board of Supervisors Amendment	Amend the state constitution to allow the governor to appoint at-large members to the boards of supervisors for the public university systems from out-of-state if there are multiple at-large seats and at least one at-large seat is filled by a member from the state.	Dec 5	118,651; 23.53%	385,647; 76.47%

=== Maine ===
Origin	Status	Measure	Description (Result of a "yes" vote)	Date	Yes	No
Veto Referendum	Failed	Maine Question 1, Religious and Philosophical Vaccination Exemptions Referendum	Repeal Legislative Document 798, which was designed to eliminate religious and philosophical exemptions from vaccination requirements for K-12 and college students and employees of healthcare facilities, and reinstate the law allowing for religious and philosophical exemptions from vaccination requirements.	Mar 3	105,214; 27.19%	281,750; 72.81%
Bond Issue	Approved	Maine Question 1, High-Speed Internet Infrastructure Bond Issue	Authorize $15 million in general obligation bonds for the ConnectME Authority to provide funding for high-speed internet infrastructure in unserved and underserved areas.	Jul 14	234,932; 75.24%	77,325; 24.76%
Bond Issue	Approved	Maine Question 2, Transportation Infrastructure Bond Issue	Authorize $105 million in general obligation bonds for transportation infrastructure projects.	Jul 14	248,056; 78.99%	65,975; 21.01%

=== Maryland ===
Origin	Status	Measure	Description (Result of a "yes" vote)	Date	Yes	No
Legislature	Approved	Maryland Question 1, Legislative Authority over State Budget Amendment	Authorize the Maryland General Assembly to increase, decrease, or add items to the state budget as long as such measures do not exceed the total proposed budget submitted by the governor.	Nov 3	2,033,605; 74.67%	689,975; 25.33%
Legislature	Approved	Maryland Question 2, Sports Betting Measure	Authorize sports and events wagering at certain licensed facilities with state revenue intended to fund public education.	Nov 3	1,904,098; 67.07%	934,950; 32.93%

=== Massachusetts ===
Origin	Status	Measure	Description (Result of a "yes" vote)	Date	Yes	No
Citizens	Approved	Massachusetts Question 1, "Right to Repair Law" Vehicle Data Access Requirement Initiative	Require manufacturers that sell vehicles with telematics systems in Massachusetts to equip them with a standardized open data platform beginning with model year 2022 that vehicle owners and independent repair facilities may access to retrieve mechanical data and run diagnostics through a mobile-based application.	Nov 3	2,599,182; 74.97%	867,674; 25.03%
Citizens	Failed	Massachusetts Question 2, Ranked-Choice Voting Initiative	Enact ranked-choice voting (RCV) for primary and general elections for state executive officials, state legislators, federal congressional and senate seats, and certain county offices beginning in 2022.	Mar 3	1,549,919; 45.22%	1,877,447; 54.78%

=== Michigan ===
Origin	Status	Measure	Description (Result of a "yes" vote)	Date	Yes	No
Legislature	Approved	Michigan Proposal 1, Use of State and Local Park Funds Amendment	Make changes to how revenue in the state's park-related funds can be spent, including making projects to renovate recreational facilities eligible for grants, requiring that at least 20% of the parks endowment fund spending be spent on park capital improvements, and removing the cap on the size of the natural resources trust fund.	Nov 3	4,154,745; 84.29%	774,509; 15.71%
Legislature	Approved	Michigan Proposal 2, Search Warrant for Electronic Data Amendment	Require a search warrant to access a person's electronic data and electronic communications.	Nov 3	4,472,671; 88.75%	567,130; 11.25%

=== Mississippi ===
Origin	Status	Measure	Description (Result of a "yes" vote)	Date	Yes	No
Citizens	Approved	Mississippi Ballot Measure 1, Medical Marijuana Amendment	Signifies that the voter wanted either Initiative 65 or Alternative 65A to pass, thereby allowing the use of medical marijuana by qualified patients. The voter then needed to proceed to the second question to choose their preferred version. (Note: In order for either Initiative 65 or Alternative 65A to pass, Mississippi Ballot Measure 1 must first receive majority support for 'either measure' over 'neither measure')	Nov 3	816,107; 68.52%	374,931; 31.48%
Citizens	Approved	Mississippi Ballot Measure 1: Initiative 65 or Alternative 65A, Medical Marijuana Amendment	Yes signified that the voter approved of Initiative 65 - which would allow medical marijuana to be recommended for patients with at least one of the 22 specified qualifying conditions including cancer, epilepsy or seizures, Parkinson's disease, post-traumatic stress disorder (PTSD), Crohn’s disease, and HIV, with marijuana sales taxed at the state's sales tax rate, and for up to 2.5 ounces of medical marijuana to be eligible for patient possession at one time - over Alternative 65A, which did not specify qualifying conditions, possession limits, or a tax rate and would leave such details up to the state legislature.	Nov 3	766,478; 73.70% (Note: Approval for either Initiative 65 or Alternative 65A needed at least 40% of the general election vote to be enacted - with the 766,478 votes cast in favor of Initiative 65 amounting to 57.89% of the votes cast at the election)	273,805; 26.30%
Legislature	Approved	Mississippi Ballot Measure 2, Remove Electoral Vote Requirement and Establish Runoffs for Gubernatorial and State Office Elections Amendment	Remove the requirement that a candidate for governor or elected state office receive the most votes in a majority of the state's 122 House of Representatives districts (the electoral vote requirement), remove the role of the Mississippi House of Representatives in choosing a winner if no candidate receives majority approval, and provide that a candidate for governor or state office must receive a majority vote of the people to win and that a runoff election will be held between the two highest vote-getters in the event that no candidate receives a majority vote.	Nov 3	984,788; 79.28%	257,314; 20.72%
Legislature	Approved	Mississippi Ballot Measure 3, State Flag Referendum	Adopt a new official Mississippi state flag as designed by the Commission to Redesign the Mississippi State Flag, which may not contain the Confederate Battle Flag and must include the words "In God We Trust."	Nov 3	943,918; 72.98%	349,522; 27.02%

=== Missouri ===
Origin	Status	Measure	Description (Result of a "yes" vote)	Date	Yes	No
Citizens	Approved	Missouri Amendment 2, Medicaid Expansion Initiative	Expand Medicaid eligibility in Missouri to adults that are 19 years old or older and younger than 65 whose income is 133% of the federal poverty level or below, which would effectively expand Medicaid to those with incomes at or below 138% of the federal poverty level under the Affordable Care Act; prohibit any additional restrictions or requirements for the expanded population to qualify for Medicaid coverage than for other populations that qualify for Medicaid coverage; and require the state to seek maximum federal funding of Medicaid expansion.	Aug 4	676,687; 53.27%	593,491; 46.73%
Legislature	Failed	Missouri Amendment 1, State Executive Term Limits Amendment	Limit the lieutenant governor, secretary of state, state auditor, and attorney general, along with the governor and state treasurer, to two terms of office.	Mar 3	1,363,767; 47.16%	1,527,782; 52.84%
Legislature	Approved	Missouri Amendment 3, Redistricting Process and Criteria, Lobbying, and Campaign Finance Amendment	Eliminate the nonpartisan state demographer and use a bipartisan commission appointed by the governor again for legislative redistricting, alter the criteria used to draw district maps, change the threshold of lobbyists' gifts from $5 to $0, and lower the campaign contribution limit for state senate campaigns from $2,500 to $2,400.	Nov 3	1,489,503; 51.01%	1,430,358; 48.99%

=== Montana ===
Origin	Status	Measure	Description (Result of a "yes" vote)	Date	Yes	No
Legislature	Approved	Montana LR-130, Limit Local Government Authority to Regulate Firearms Measure	Remove local governments' authority to regulate the carrying of permitted concealed weapons.	Nov 3	298,388; 50.96%	287,129; 49.04%
Legislature	Approved	Montana C-46, Initiated Amendment Distribution Requirements Measure	Amend constitutional language to match the existing signature distribution requirements for initiated constitutional amendments.	Nov 3	426,279; 76.87%	128,295; 23.13%
Legislature	Approved	Montana C-47, Initiated Statute and Referendum Distribution Requirements Amendment	Amend constitutional language to match the existing signature distribution requirements for initiated state statutes and veto referendums.	Nov 3	411,153; 74.56%	140,300; 25.44%
Citizens	Approved	Montana CI-118, Allow for a Legal Age for Marijuana Amendment	Amend state constitution to allow for the legislature or a citizen initiative to establish a minimum legal age for the possession, use, and purchase of marijuana, similar to the regulation of alcohol in the state constitution..	Nov 3	340,847; 57.84%	248,442; 42.16%
Citizens	Approved	Montana I-190, Marijuana Legalization Initiative	Legalize the possession and use of marijuana for adults over the age of 21, imposing a 20% tax on marijuana sales, requiring the Department of Revenue to develop rules to regulate marijuana businesses, and allowing for the resentencing or expungement of marijuana-related crimes.	Nov 3	341,037; 56.90%	258,337; 43.10%

=== Nebraska ===
Origin	Status	Measure	Description (Result of a "yes" vote)	Date	Yes	No
Legislature	Approved	Nebraska Amendment 1, Remove Slavery as Punishment for Crime from Constitution Amendment	Remove language from the Nebraska Constitution that allows the use of slavery and involuntary servitude as criminal punishments.	Nov 3	603,204; 68.23%	280,898; 31.77%
Legislature	Approved	Nebraska Amendment 2, Tax Increment Financing (TIF) Repayment Amendment	Increase the repayment period for tax increment financing from 15 to 20 years for areas where more than one-half of properties are designated as extremely blighted.	Nov 3	520,236; 61.16%	330,445; 38.84%
Citizens	Approved	Nebraska Initiative 428, Payday Lender Interest Rate Cap Initiative	Limit the annual interest charged for delayed deposit services—also known as payday lending—to 36%.	Nov 3	723,521; 82.80%	150,330; 17.20%
Citizens	Approved	Nebraska Initiative 429, Authorize Laws for Gambling at Racetracks Amendment	Amend the Nebraska Constitution to allow laws that authorize, regulate, and tax gambling at licensed racetrack facilities in the state. Together, Initiatives 429, 430, and 431 would allow, authorize and regulate, and tax gambling at licensed racetracks.	Nov 3	588,405; 65.04%	316,298; 34.96%
Citizens	Approved	Nebraska Initiative 430, Authorizing Gambling at Racetracks Initiative	Enact a law that authorizes gambling operations within licensed racetracks and establishes the Nebraska Gaming Commission to regulate gambling operations. Together, Initiatives 429, 430, and 431 would allow, authorize and regulate, and tax gambling at licensed racetracks.	Nov 3	591,086; 65.01%	318,094; 34.99%
Citizens	Approved	Nebraska Initiative 431, Tax on Gambling at Racetracks Initiative	Impose an annual tax of 20% on gross gambling revenue of licensed gaming operators; distribute 2.5% of the accrued tax revenue to the Compulsive Gamblers Assistance Fund, 2.5% to the General Fund, 70% to the Property Tax Credit Cash Fund, and 25% to the counties where gambling is authorized at licensed racetracks. Together, Initiatives 429, 430, and 431 would allow, authorize and regulate, and tax gambling at licensed racetracks.	Nov 3	620,835; 68.71%	282,703; 31.29%

=== Nevada ===
Origin	Status	Measure	Description (Result of a "yes" vote)	Date	Yes	No
Legislature	Failed	Nevada Question 1, Remove Constitutional Status of Board of Regents Amendment	Remove the constitutional status of the Board of Regents—which governs, controls, and manages the state universities in Nevada—thereby allowing the state legislature to review and change the governing organization of state universities.	Nov 3	626,146; 49.85%	630,023; 50.15%
Legislature	Approved	Nevada Question 2, Marriage Regardless of Gender Amendment	Recognize marriage as between couples regardless of gender; state that religious organizations and clergy have the right to refuse to solemnize a marriage; and repeal Question 2, which defined marriage as between a male person and female person.	Nov 3	821,050; 62.43%	494,186; 37.57%
Legislature	Approved	Nevada Question 3, State Board of Pardons Commissioners Amendment	Require the State Board of Pardons Commissioners, which is responsible for granting pardons, to meet four times per year, allow any board member to submit an issue for the board's consideration, and provide that a majority of board members is sufficient to issue a pardon.	Nov 3	782,015; 61.18%	496,287; 38.82%
Legislature	Approved	Nevada Question 4, State Constitutional Rights of Voters Amendment	Provide qualified persons who are registered to vote with a constitutional right to receive and cast a ballot that is written in a "format that allows the clear identification of candidates" and "accurately records the voter’s preference in the selection of candidates." It also provided registered voters with other constitutional rights, including: to have questions about voting procedures answered and have voting procedures posted in a visible location at the polling place; to vote without intimidation, threats, or coercion; to vote during any early voting period or on election day if the voter is in line at the time polls close; to return a spoiled ballot and receive a replacement ballot; to request assistance in voting if necessary; to a sample ballot "which is accurate, informative and delivered in a timely manner;" to receive instruction on how to use voting equipment; to equal access to the elections system without discrimination, including on the basis of "race, age, disability, military service, employment or overseas residence;" to a "uniform, statewide standard for counting and recounting all votes accurately;" and to have "complaints about elections and election contests resolved fairly, accurately and efficiently."	Nov 3	826,719; 64.12%	462,544; 35.88%
Citizens	Approved	Nevada Question 6, Renewable Energy Standards Initiative	Amend the state Constitution to require electric utilities to acquire 50 percent of their electricity from renewable resources by 2030.	Nov 3	747,581; 57.94% (Note: In Nevada, citizen-initiated constitutional amendments need to be approved in two even-numbered election years, meaning that Question 6 needed to be approved in 2018 and again in 2020 to amend the Nevada Constitution. As the amendment passed in both 2018 and 2020 it was added to the Nevada Constitution.)	542,654; 42.06%

=== New Jersey ===
Origin	Status	Measure	Description (Result of a "yes" vote)	Date	Yes	No
Legislature	Approved	New Jersey Public Question 1, Marijuana Legalization Amendment	Legalize the possession and use of marijuana for persons age 21 and older and legalize the cultivation, processing, and sale of retail marijuana.	Nov 3	2,737,682; 67.08%	1,343,610; 32.92%
Legislature	Approved	New Jersey Public Question 2, Peacetime Veterans Eligible for Property Tax Deduction Amendment	Make peacetime veterans eligible for a $250 property tax deduction.	Nov 3	3,064,754; 76.48%	942,580; 23.52%
Legislature	Approved	New Jersey Public Question 3, Delayed State Legislative Redistricting Amendment	Postpone the state legislative redistricting process until after the election on November 2, 2021, if the state receives federal census data after February 15, 2021; keep the current state legislative districts in place until 2023; and use the delayed timeline in future redistricting cycles if the census data is received after February 15.	Nov 3	2,225,089; 57.79%	1,625,348; 42.21%

=== New Mexico ===
Origin	Status	Measure	Description (Result of a "yes" vote)	Date	Yes	No
Legislature	Approved	New Mexico Constitutional Amendment 1, Appointed Public Regulation Commission Amendment	Change the Public Regulation Commission from an elected five-member commission to an appointed three-member commission.	Nov 3	445,655; 55.63%	355,471; 44.37%
Legislature	Approved	New Mexico Constitutional Amendment 2, Elections and Terms of Non-Statewide Officeholders Amendment	Amend the New Mexico Constitution to allow the state legislature to pass laws adjusting the election dates of state or county officeholders and adjust office terms according to those date changes.	Nov 3	503,308; 64.44%	277,744; 35.56%
Bond Issue	Approved	New Mexico Bond Question A, Senior Citizens Facilities Bond Issue	Author the sale and issuance of $33.3 million in bonds for senior citizen facilities improvements.	Nov 3	550,541; 68.10%	257,888; 31.90%
Bond Issue	Approved	New Mexico Bond Question B, Public Libraries Bond Issue	Author the sale and issuance of $9.7 million in bonds for public library improvements.	Nov 3	535,150; 66.25%	272,681; 33.75%
Bond Issue	Approved	New Mexico Bond Question C, Public Education Bond Issue	Author the sale and issuance of $156.3 million in bonds for public higher education institutions, special public schools, and native tribal schools.	Nov 3	526,350; 64.92%	284,426; 35.08%

=== North Dakota ===
Origin	Status	Measure	Description (Result of a "yes" vote)	Date	Yes	No
Legislature	Failed	North Dakota Constitutional Measure 1, Board of Higher Education Membership Amendment	Increase the membership of the Board of Higher Education from eight to 15; increase term length from four years to six years; and prohibit state employees, officials, legislators, from being members.	Nov 3	91,706; 27.48%	242,004; 72.52%
Legislature	Failed	North Dakota Constitutional Measure 2, Require Initiated Constitutional Amendments to be Approved by the Legislature or Passed Twice Amendment	Require initiated constitutional amendments passed by voters to be submitted to the legislature for approval and in the case of rejection, require the measure to be placed on the ballot again at the next statewide election to become effective if approved by the voters a second time.	Nov 3	125,460; 38.39%	201,343; 61.61%

=== Oklahoma ===
Origin	Status	Measure	Description (Result of a "yes" vote)	Date	Yes	No
Citizens	Approved	Oklahoma State Question 802, Medicaid Expansion Initiative	Expand Medicaid eligibility to adults between 18 and 65 whose income is 133% of the federal poverty level or below, which effectively expanded Medicaid to those with incomes at or below 138% of the federal poverty level under the Affordable Care Act.	Jun 30	340,572; 50.49%	334,019; 49.51%
Citizens	Failed	Oklahoma State Question 805, Criminal History in Sentencing and Sentence Modification Initiative	Prohibit the use of a person's past non-violent felony convictions to impose a greater (enhanced) sentence when sentencing a person convicted of a non-violent felony; and provide for sentence modifications for eligible individuals serving or set to serve sentences that were enhanced based on past felony convictions.	Nov 3	588,280; 38.92%	923,328; 61.08%
Legislature	Failed	Oklahoma State Question 814, Decrease Tobacco Settlement Endowment Trust Fund Deposits and Fund Medicaid Program Amendment	Decrease the percentage of money (from 75% to 25%) that is deposited to the Tobacco Settlement Endowment Trust Fund from funds the state receives from tobacco settlements and directing the state legislature to appropriate funds to secure federal matching funds for the state's Medicaid program.	Nov 3	615,161; 41.21%	877,432; 58.79%

=== Oregon ===
Origin	Status	Measure	Description (Result of a "yes" vote)	Date	Yes	No
Legislature	Approved	Oregon Measure 107, Campaign Finance Limits Amendment	Authorize the state legislature and local governments to enact laws or ordinances limiting campaign contributions and expenditures; require disclosure of contributions and expenditures; and require that political advertisements identify the people or entities that paid for them.	Nov 3	1,763,276; 78.31%	488,413; 21.69%
Legislature	Approved	Oregon Measure 108, Tobacco and E-Cigarette Tax Increase for Health Programs Measure	Increase taxes on tobacco products and inhalant delivery systems (such as e-cigarettes) to fund the state's Medical Assistance Program and other healthcare-related programs.	Nov 3	1,535,866; 66.34%	779,311; 33.66%
Citizens	Approved	Oregon Measure 109, Psilocybin Mushroom Services Program Initiative	Authorize the Oregon Health Authority to create a program to permit licensed service providers to administer psilocybin-producing mushroom and fungi products to individuals 21 years of age or older.	Nov 3	1,270,057; 55.75%	1,008,199; 44.25%
Citizens	Approved	Oregon Measure 110, Drug Decriminalization and Addiction Treatment Initiative	Make personal non-commercial possession of a controlled substance no more than a Class E violation (max fine of $100 fine) and establishing a drug addiction treatment and recovery program funded in part by the state's marijuana tax revenue and state prison savings.	Nov 3	1,333,268; 58.46%	947,313; 41.54%

=== Rhode Island ===
Origin	Status	Measure	Description (Result of a "yes" vote)	Date	Yes	No
Legislature	Approved	Rhode Island Question 1, Name Change Amendment	Amend the Rhode Island Constitution to remove "Providence Plantations" from the official state name in the Preamble, Article III (Oath of Officers), and Article IX (Commissions).	Nov 3	247,261; 53.12%	218,175; 46.88%

=== South Dakota ===
Origin	Status	Measure	Description (Result of a "yes" vote)	Date	Yes	No
Citizens	Approved	South Dakota Initiated Measure 26, Medical Marijuana Initiative	Establish a medical marijuana program in South Dakota for individuals with a debilitating medical condition.	Nov 3	291,754; 69.92%	125,488; 30.08%
Citizens	Approved	South Dakota Constitutional Amendment A, Marijuana Legalization Initiative	Legalize the recreational use of marijuana and require the South Dakota State Legislature to pass laws providing for the use of medical marijuana and the sale of hemp by April 1, 2022.	Nov 3	225,260; 54.18%	190,477; 45.82%
Legislature	Approved	South Dakota Constitutional Amendment B, Deadwood Sports Betting Legalization Amendment	Authorize the South Dakota State Legislature to legalize sports betting within the city limits of Deadwood, South Dakota, with all net municipal proceeds dedicated to the Deadwood Historic Restoration and Preservation Fund.	Nov 3	239,620; 58.47%	170,191; 41.53%

=== Utah ===
Origin	Status	Measure	Description (Result of a "yes" vote)	Date	Yes	No
Legislature	Approved	Utah Constitutional Amendment A, Gender-Neutral Constitutional Language Amendment	Remove gendered language in the Utah Constitution and replace it with gender-neutral language.	Nov 3	828,629; 57.69%	607,829; 42.31%
Legislature	Approved	Utah Constitutional Amendment B, Legislator Qualifications Amendment	Specify that certain qualifications of a legislator—such as age— apply as of the time of election or appointment rather than the time a legislator assumes office.	Nov 3	1,114,795; 80.10%	276,897; 19.90%
Legislature	Approved	Utah Constitutional Amendment C, Remove Slavery as Punishment for a Crime from Constitution Amendment	Remove language from the Utah Constitution that allows the use of slavery and involuntary servitude as criminal punishments.	Nov 3	1,138,974; 80.48%	276,171; 19.52%
Legislature	Approved	Utah Constitutional Amendment D, Municipal Water Resources Amendment	Specify the circumstances under which a municipality may commit water resources or supply water outside its boundary or exchange water resources and revise provisions surrounding municipal water rights.	Nov 3	827,596; 61.14%	525,985; 38.86%
Legislature	Approved	Utah Constitutional Amendment E, Right to Hunt and Fish Amendment	Establish a constitutional right to hunt and fish in Utah.	Nov 3	1,063,212; 74.92%	355,848; 25.08%
Legislature	Approved	Utah Constitutional Amendment F, Legislative Session Start Date Amendment	Allow the state legislature to set the January legislative session start date in state statute.	Nov 3	895,435; 66.51%	450,835; 33.49%
Legislature	Approved	Utah Constitutional Amendment G, Use Income and Property Tax Revenue to Support Children and Individuals with Disabilities Amendment	Allow the Utah State Legislature to use revenue from income taxes and intangible property taxes to support children and individuals with a disability.	Nov 3	764,420; 54.09%	648,840; 45.91%

=== Virginia ===
Origin	Status	Measure	Description (Result of a "yes" vote)	Date	Yes	No
Legislature	Approved	Virginia Question 1, Redistricting Commission Amendment	Transfer the power to draw the state's congressional and legislative districts from the state legislature to a redistricting commission composed of state legislators and citizens.	Nov 3	2,770,489; 65.69%	1,447,279; 34.31%
Legislature	Approved	Virginia Question 2, Motor Vehicle Property Tax Exemption for Disabled Veterans Amendment	Exempt one automobile or pickup truck from state and local property taxes for veterans who have a 100 percent service-connected, permanent, and total disability.	Nov 3	3,713,466; 85.99%	605,172; 14.01%

=== Washington ===
Origin	Status	Measure	Description (Result of a "yes" vote)	Date	Yes	No
Veto Referendum	Approved	Washington Referendum 90, Sex Education in Public Schools Measure	Allow Senate Bill 5395 to take effect, thereby requiring public schools to provide comprehensive sexual health education for all students and requiring students to be excused if requested by their parents.	Nov 3	2,283,630; 57.82%	1,665,906; 42.18%
Advisory Question	Failed	Washington Advisory Vote 32, Nonbinding Question on Carryout Bag Tax	Advise the legislature to maintain Senate Bill 5323, which was designed to levy a tax on certain carryout bags provided by retailers.	Nov 3	1,488,767; 38.77%	2,350,996; 61.23%
Advisory Question	Failed	Washington Advisory Vote 33, Nonbinding Question on Heavy Equipment Rental Tax	Advise the legislature to maintain Senate Bill 5628, which was designed to levy a tax on heavy equipment rentals.	Nov 3	1,533,746; 40.40%	2,262,993; 59.60%
Advisory Question	Failed	Washington Advisory Vote 34, Nonbinding Question on Business and Occupation Tax Rate Increase and Surcharge Decrease	Advise the legislature to maintain Senate Bill 6492, which was designed to increase the business and occupation tax rate and reduce certain surcharges.	Nov 3	1,430,112; 37.99%	2,334,609; 62.01%
Advisory Question	Failed	Washington Advisory Vote 35, Nonbinding Question on Business and Occupation Tax Rate Increase on Commercial Airplane Manufacturers	Advise the legislature to maintain Senate Bill 6690, which was designed to increase the business and occupation tax rate on commercial airplane manufacturers.	Nov 3	1,725,885; 45.53%	2,064,701; 54.47%
Legislature	Failed	Washington Senate Joint Resolution 8212, Authorize Fund Investment of Long-Term Services and Supports Trust Account Amendment	Allow the Washington Legislature to invest the Long-Term Care Services and Supports Trust Account into stocks or other methods of investment.	Nov 3	1,738,080; 45.64%	2,069,809; 54.36%

=== Wisconsin ===
Origin	Status	Measure	Description (Result of a "yes" vote)	Date	Yes	No
Legislature	Approved	Wisconsin Marsy's Law Crime Victims Rights Amendment	Add specific rights of crime victims, together known as a Marsy's Law, to the Wisconsin Constitution.	Apr 7	1,107,067; 74.90%	371,013; 25.10%

=== Wyoming ===
Origin	Status	Measure	Description (Result of a "yes" vote)	Date	Yes	No
Legislature	Failed	Wyoming Constitutional Amendment A, Municipal Debt for Sewage Systems Measure	Remove the constitutional limit on debt that a municipality may incur for municipal sewer projects and to allow the legislature to establish rules in statute for additional debt for municipal sewage projects.	Nov 3	126,589; 51.17%	120,808; 48.83% (Note: Measure failed as it required approval from a majority of voters casting a ballot at the election- with the total votes for Amendment A being only 45.45% of the total votes cast in the general election.)

== Other jurisdictions ==
=== District of Columbia ===
Origin	Status	Measure	Description (Result of a "yes" vote)	Date	Yes	No
Citizens	Approved	Washington, D.C., Initiative 81, Entheogenic Plants and Fungus Measure	Declare that police shall treat the non-commercial cultivation, distribution, possession, and use of entheogenic plants and fungi among the lowest law enforcement priorities and define entheogenic plants and fungi as species of plants and fungi that contain ibogaine, dimethyltryptamine, mescaline, psilocybin, or psilocyn.	Nov 3	214,685; 76.18%	67,140; 23.82%

=== Puerto Rico ===
Origin	Status	Measure	Description (Result of a "yes" vote)	Date	Yes	No
Legislature	Approved	Puerto Rico Statehood Referendum	Support the position that Puerto Rico should seek statehood.	Nov 3	655,505; 52.52%	592,671; 47.48%

=== United States Virgin Islands ===
Origin	Status	Measure	Description (Result of a "yes" vote)	Date	Yes	No
Legislature	Approved	U.S. Virgin Islands Constitutional Convention Question	Support the Legislature enacting a bill to convene a constitutional convention to adopt the Revised Organic Act of the Virgin Islands (or a portion of the act) as the Constitution of the Virgin Islands.	Nov 3	7,275; 71.92%	2,840; 28.08%
