= 2020 Nevada Question 2 =

Referendum on same-sex marriage

- November 3, 2020
- Marriage Regardless of Gender Amendment

Results
| Choice | Votes | % |
|---|---|---|
| Yes | 821,050 | 62.43% |
| No | 494,186 | 37.57% |
| Valid votes | 1,315,236 | 100.00% |
| Invalid or blank votes | 0 | 0.00% |
| Total votes | 1,315,236 | 100.00% |
| Registered voters/turnout | 1,822,166 | 72.18% |

Yes
70–80%
60–70%
50–60%
No
60–70%
50–60%
- Source: Nevada Secretary of State

Question 2 appeared on the November 3, 2020, ballot in Nevada as a legislatively referred constitutional amendment. The amendment removed the state's unenforceable ban on same-sex marriage from the state constitution. A majority of voters backed the measure, making Nevada the first state to enshrine same-sex marriage into its constitution.

== Preceding legislative process ==
In 2013, the Nevada Legislature began work on legislation to repeal the constitutional ban on same-sex marriage and substitute in its place a gender-neutral definition of marriage. The Senate approved such legislation on April 22 on a 12–9 vote, and the Nevada Assembly passed the resolution on May 23 by a 27–14 vote. It would have required approval by the next legislative session in 2015 and by voters in the 2016 election to take effect. However, as Republicans took control of the Senate following the 2014 elections, no second vote was held. On February 1, 2017, after the Democratic Party took control of the Senate following the 2016 elections, identical legislation (known as Assembly Joint Resolution 2) was introduced to repeal the ban. The resolution passed the Assembly on March 9 in a 27–14 vote. The Senate amended it to include a religious exemption, after which it passed the bill on May 1 in a 19–2 vote. The Assembly approved the Senate's amendment on May 2.

The resolution returned to the Nevada Legislature in February 2019. It was approved by the Assembly on March 29 in a 38–2 vote and by the Senate on May 23, 2019, in a 19–2 vote.

March 29, 2019 vote in the Assembly
| Political affiliation | Voted for | Voted against | Absent (Did not vote) |
|---|---|---|---|
| Democratic Party | 28: Alexander Assefa; Shea Backus; Teresa Benitez-Thompson; Shannon Bilbray-Axelrod; Maggie Carlton; Richard Carrillo; Lesley Cohen; Skip Daly; Bea Duran; Edgar Flores; Jason Frierson; Ozzie Fumo; Michelle Gorelow; Sandra Jauregui; Susie Martinez; William McCurdy II; Brittney Miller; Daniele Monroe-Moreno; Connie Munk; Dina Neal; Rochelle Nguyen; Sarah Peters; Ellen Spiegel; Heidi Swank; Tyrone Thompson; Selena Torres; Howard Watts III; Steve Yeager | – | – |
| Republican Party | 9: Chris Edwards; Gregory Hafen II; Melissa Hardy; Al Kramer; Lisa Krasner; Glen Leavitt; Tom Roberts; Robin Titus; Jill Tolles | 2: John Ellison; Jim Wheeler | 2: John Hambrick; Alexis Hansen |
| Total (Note: The Assembly had 41 seats at the time due to a vacancy. Representative Olivia Diaz resigned and announced her intention to seek election to the Las Vegas City Council in December 2018.) | 37 | 2 | 2 |
| Total | 90.2% | 4.9% | 4.9% |

May 23, 2019 vote in the Senate
| Political affiliation | Voted for | Voted against | Absent (Did not vote) |
|---|---|---|---|
| Democratic Party | 12: Chris Brooks; Yvanna Cancela; Nicole Cannizzaro; Mo Denis; Marilyn Dondero Loop; Dallas Harris; James Ohrenschall; David Parks; Julia Ratti; Melanie Scheible; Pat Spearman; Joyce Woodhouse | 1: Marcia Washington | – |
| Republican Party | 7: Heidi Gansert; Pete Goicoechea; Scott Hammond; Joe Hardy; Ben Kieckhefer; Keith Pickard; James Settelmeyer | 1: Ira Hansen | – |
| Total | 19 | 2 | 0 |
| Total | 90.5% | 9.5% | 0.0% |

== Question 2 ==
Question 2 was placed on the November 6, 2020 ballot, and approved with 62% of the vote.

=== Text ===
The measure appeared on the ballot as follows:

Shall the Nevada Constitution be amended to: (1) remove an existing provision recognizing marriage as only between a male person and a female person and require the State of Nevada and its political subdivisions to recognize marriages of and issue marriage licenses to couples, regardless of gender; (2) require all legally valid marriages to be treated equally under the law; and (3) establish a right for religious organizations and clergy members to refuse to perform a marriage and provide that no person is entitled to make any claim against them for exercising that right?
Yes [ ] No [ ]

== Results ==
All counties had fully reported their results by December 17, 2020. The 62.43% "Yes" vote assured the passage of the ballot measure.

Breakdown of voting for Question 2, 2020 by county
| County | Yes (%) | Yes votes | No (%) | No votes | Formal total |
|---|---|---|---|---|---|
| Carson City | 57.96% | 16,691 | 42.04% | 12,107 | 28,798 |
| Churchill | 44.35% | 5,523 | 55.65% | 6,929 | 12,452 |
| Clark | 64.75% | 584,484 | 35.25% | 318,205 | 902,689 |
| Douglas | 52.31% | 17,051 | 47.69% | 15,548 | 32,599 |
| Elko | 46.37% | 9,842 | 53.63% | 11,381 | 21,223 |
| Esmeralda | 33.97% | 159 | 66.03% | 309 | 468 |
| Eureka | 31.56% | 303 | 68.44% | 657 | 960 |
| Humboldt | 43.24% | 3,258 | 56.76% | 4,277 | 7,535 |
| Lander | 41.53% | 1,111 | 58.47% | 1,564 | 2,675 |
| Lincoln | 32.02% | 755 | 67.98% | 1,603 | 2,358 |
| Lyon | 47.26% | 13,750 | 52.74% | 15,344 | 29,094 |
| Mineral | 47.46% | 1,056 | 52.54% | 1,169 | 2,225 |
| Nye | 47.04% | 11,448 | 52.96% | 12,888 | 24,336 |
| Pershing | 39.58% | 874 | 60.42% | 1,334 | 2,208 |
| Storey | 50.45% | 1,410 | 49.55% | 1,385 | 2,795 |
| Washoe | 63.51% | 151,545 | 36.49% | 87,068 | 238,613 |
| White Pine | 42.54% | 1,790 | 57.46% | 2,418 | 4,208 |
| Nevada | 62.43% | 821,050 | 37.57% | 494,186 | 1,315,236 |

== See also ==
- 2002 Nevada Question 2
- Same-sex marriage in Nevada
- 2020 United States ballot measures
