= Senator Nguyen =

Senator Nguyen may refer to:

- Janet Nguyen (born 1976), California State Senate
- Joe Nguyen (born 1983), Washington State Senate
- Rochelle Nguyen (born 1977), Nevada State Senate
