= Defense of marriage amendment =

Defense of marriage amendment or Defense of marriage act may refer to:

- Defense of Marriage Act, the statute banning federal recognition of same-sex marriage in the United States
- Federal Marriage Amendment, a proposed constitutional amendment to ban same-sex unions in the United States
- U.S. state constitutional amendments banning same-sex unions
