= Nevada's 3rd Senate district =

American legislative district

Coordinates: 36.17°N 115.21°W

Nevada's 3rd State Senate district
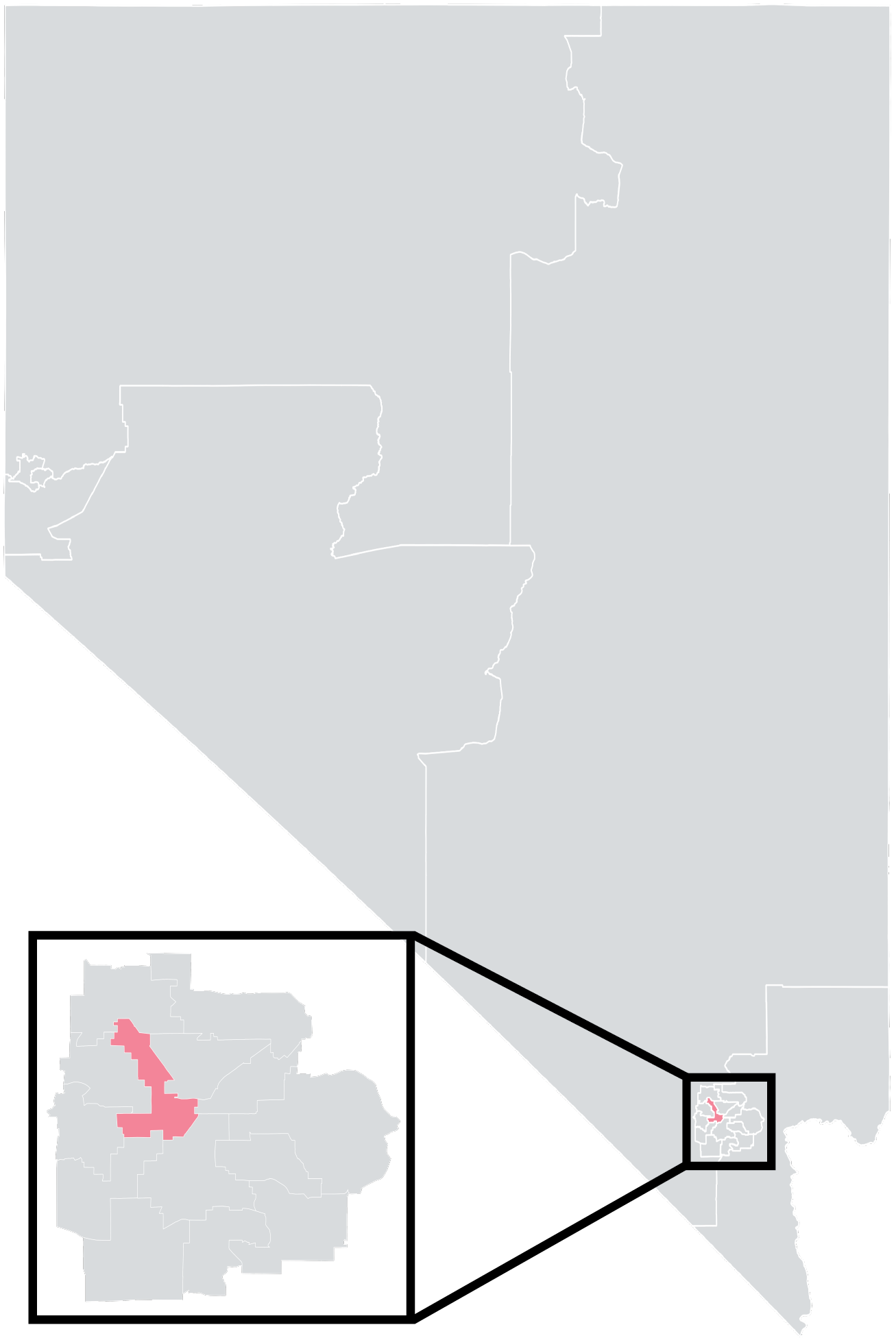
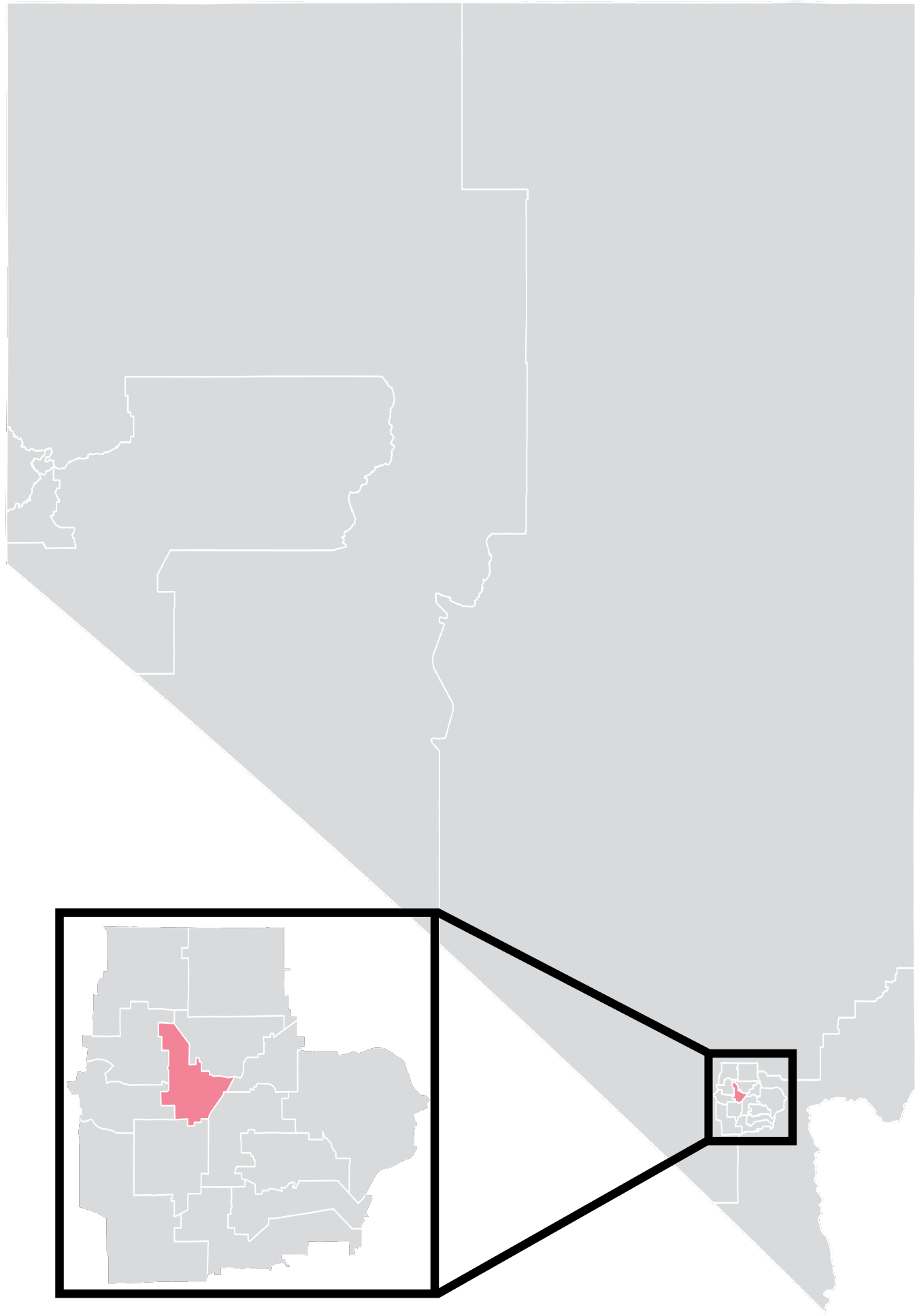
Senator
Rochelle Nguyen; D–Las Vegas
- Registration: 51.7% Democratic; 26.9% Republican; 16.0% No party preference
- Demographics: 30% White; 13% Black; 46% Hispanic; 6% Asian; 5% Other
- Population (2018): 133,986
- Registered voters: 56,194

Nevada's 3rd Senate district is one of 21 districts in the Nevada Senate. It has been represented by Democrat Rochelle Nguyen since 2022, when she was appointed to succeed fellow Democrat Chris Brooks.

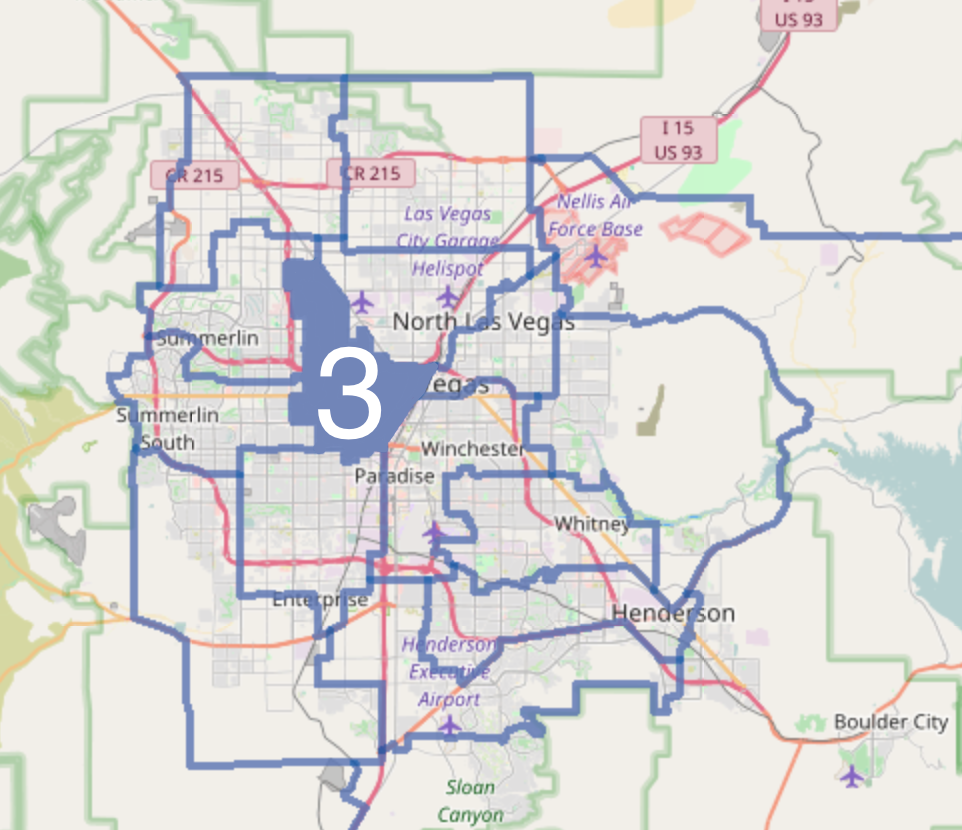
Closeup on the Las Vegas Valley with District 3 colored blue

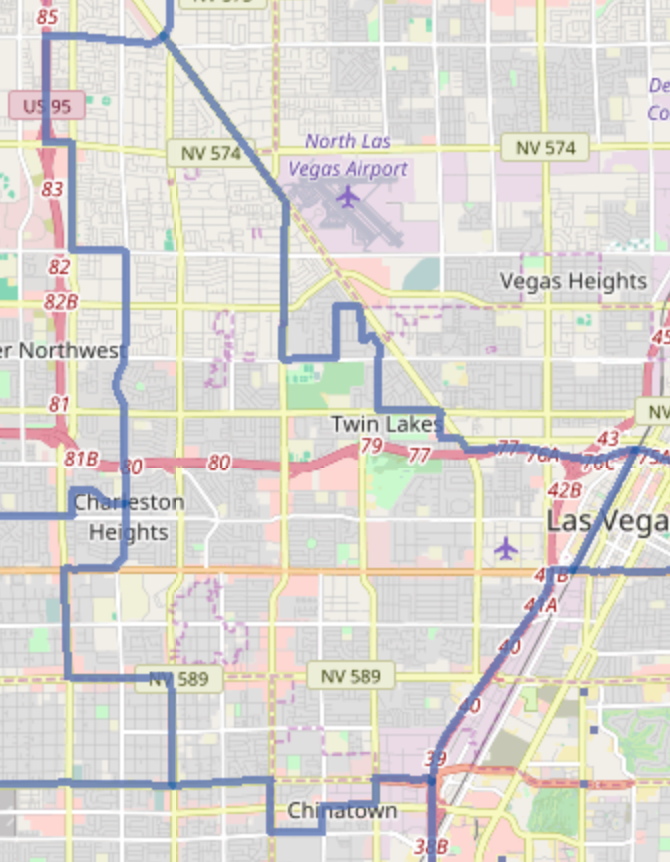
Closeup map of District 3

== Geography and demographics ==
District 3 is based in Las Vegas, including parts of Downtown Las Vegas, and also covers small sections of Paradise and Spring Valley in Clark County.

The district overlaps with Nevada's 1st and 4th congressional districts, and with the 3rd and 10th districts of the Nevada Assembly. It has a surface area of 20.4 square miles (53 km^{2}) and a perimeter of 26.8 miles (43.1 km). It is the second-smallest Senate district, after the 2nd district.

According to the 2010 census, the district's population was 128,724 – 0.1% above the ideal. Just under 45% of the inhabitants of the district were Hispanic or Latino. The percentage of Hispanics and Latinos in District 3 was twice as high as the average in Nevada, while the percentage of whites was almost 10% lower than the state average. The median household income amounted to nearly $40,000, which is over $10,000 lower than the median of the state, and the district's poverty rate was 22%.

== Recent election results ==
Nevada Senators are elected to staggered four-year terms; since 2012 redistricting, the 3rd district has held elections in presidential years.

=== 2024 ===
2024 Nevada State Senate election, District 3
Party	Candidate	Votes	%
Democratic	Rochelle Nguyen (incumbent)	28,254	54.81
Republican	Brent Howard	21,215	41.16
Independent	Keya Jones	2,078	4.03
Total votes		51,547	100
Democratic hold			

=== 2020 ===
2020 Nevada State Senate election, District 3
Party	Candidate	Votes	%
Democratic	Chris Brooks (incumbent)	30,944	100
Total votes		30,944	100
Democratic hold			

=== 2016 ===
In 2016, incumbent Tick Segerblom faced Republican Dennis Palmerston and Libertarian general contractor Jonathan Friedrich. Segerblom focused on criminal justice reform and recreational marijuana legalization, Friedrich opposed marijuana legalization and criticized homeowner associations, and Palmerston did not actively campaign. Segerblom defeated both opponents with over 60% of the vote.

2016 Nevada State Senate election, District 3
Party	Candidate	Votes	%
Democratic	Tick Segerblom (incumbent)	21,195	60.3
Republican	Dennis Palmerston	11,057	31.5
Libertarian	Jonathan Freidrich	2,889	8.2
Total votes		35,141	100
Democratic hold			

=== 2012 ===
In 2012, Assemblymember and Democrat Tick Segerblom faced veteran and Republican Ed Gobel. Segerblom focused on criminal justice issues, raising corporate taxes, and raising the gasoline tax, while Gobel argued that taxes should not be raised. Segerblom won the election with nearly 65% of the vote.

2012 Nevada State Senate election, District 3
Party	Candidate	Votes	%
Democratic	Tick Segerblom (incumbent)	21,745	64.4
Republican	Ed Gobel	12,032	35.6
Total votes		33,777	100
Democratic hold			

=== Federal and statewide results ===
Year	Office	Results
2020	President	Biden 61.0 – 36.6%
2018	Senate	Rosen 63.1 – 32.2%
2018	Governor	Sisolak 61.1 – 32.6%
2016	President	Clinton 60.4 – 33.6%
2012	President	Obama 64.4 – 33.5%
2012	Senate	Berkley 57.7 – 32.2%

== History ==
The 3rd district was created when the districts were reapportioned after the 2010 census. The new districts came into effect on January 1, 2012 for filing for office, and for nominating and electing senators, and for all other purposes on November 7 – the day after Election Day, when the new terms began. The borders of District 3 are defined in the Nevada Revised Statutes using census tracts, block groups, and blocks.
