= Shelly M. Shelton =

American businesswoman and politician

- Born: Worthington, Minnesota, U.S.
- Education: Buena Vista University
- Occupations: Businesswoman, politician
- Political party: Republican Party
- Spouse: Tony Shelton

Shelly M. Shelton is an American businesswoman and politician. She served as a Republican member of the Nevada Assembly and ended her term at the end of 2016.

== Early life ==
Shelly M. Shelton was born in Worthington, Minnesota. She graduated from Spencer School of Business, at the current Buena Vista University, where she studied business. After college, she volunteered for two years in Russia and Romania with Adventures in Mission.

== Career ==
Shelton started her career by working for Citibank in Sioux Falls, South Dakota; she was transferred to their Las Vegas office in 1997. With her husband, she co-started drycleaning and car registration businesses. In 2003 she co-founded Sonitx, an air filter and coil cleaning business, and remained active in that business until 2021. Shelton is currently the sole owner of Sonitx National, a nationwide HVAC sustainability and water conservation consulting and training firm.

Shelton served as a Republican member of the Nevada Assembly, losing to Democrat Chris Brooks in the general election which was held on November 8, 2016.

== Personal life ==
With her husband Tony, Shelton has three children. They reside in Las Vegas, Nevada.
