= U.S. state constitutional amendments banning same-sex unions =

U.S. state constitutional amendments banning same-sex unions Constitution explicitly protects same-sex marriage Constitution implicitly protects same-sex marriage through state court ruling or general sexual orientation nondiscrimination clause No part of the Constitution bans nor protects legal recognition of same-sex unions Constitution bans same-sex marriage Constitution bans same-sex marriage and civil unions Constitution bans same-sex marriage, civil unions, and any marriage-like contract between unmarried persons

Adoption of marriage amendments over time

Prior to the Supreme Court's decision in Obergefell v. Hodges (2015), U.S. state constitutional amendments banning same-sex unions of several different types passed, banning legal recognition of same-sex unions in U.S. state constitutions, referred to by proponents as "defense of marriage amendments" or "marriage protection amendments." These state amendments are different from the proposed Federal Marriage Amendment, which would ban same-sex marriage in every U.S. state, and Section 2 of the Defense of Marriage Act, more commonly known as DOMA, which allowed the states not to recognize same-sex marriages from other states. The amendments define marriage as a union between one man and one woman and prevent civil unions or same-sex marriages from being legalized, though some of the amendments bar only the latter. The Obergefell decision in June 2015 invalidated these state constitutional amendments insofar as they prevented same-sex couples from marrying, even though the actual text of these amendments remain written into the state constitutions.

Thirty-one U.S. state constitutional amendments banning legal recognition of same-sex unions have been adopted. Of these, ten make only same-sex marriage unconstitutional; sixteen make both same-sex marriage and civil unions unconstitutional; two make same-sex marriage, civil unions, and other contracts unconstitutional; and one is unique. Hawaii's amendment is unique in that it does not make same-sex marriage unconstitutional; rather, it allows the state to limit marriage to opposite-sex couples. Virginia's amendment prevents the state from recognizing private contracts that "approximate" marriage. Observers have pointed out that such language encompasses private contracts and medical directives. Furthermore, the Michigan Supreme Court has held that the state's amendment bans not only same-sex marriage and civil unions, but also domestic partnership benefits such as health insurance. On November 3, 2020, Nevada became the first U.S. state to repeal its amendment banning same-sex marriage following approval of 2020 Nevada Question 2. Three additional states, California, Colorado and Hawaii, repealed their bans in 2024. Virginia repealed its ban in 2026 following approval of 2026 Virginia Question 2.

State constitutional amendments are typically approved first by the legislature or special constitutional convention and then by the voters in a referendum. (Note: The mechanics differ: 17 states allow constitutional amendments to be proposed by popular initiative, all allow the legislature to start the process, and five allow special conventions to start the process. In all states, though, the amendment is approved by elected members of a constitutional convention or elected legislators at least once, with varying standards for approval of the measure. Voters then vote directly on the resulting referendum, except in Delaware, where constitutional amendments are voted on and ratified only by the state legislature.) In some states, one or both of these steps is repeated. (Note: Amendments to the Nevada state constitution must be approved by the voters in two consecutive elections.) The percentages shown in the list are results from the referendum stage, not the legislative stage.

== History ==
The idea of extending marriage rights to same-sex couples did not become a political issue in the United States until the 1990s. During that decade, several Western European countries legalized civil unions, and in 1993 the Supreme Court of Hawaii ruled in Baehr v. Lewin, 852 P.2d 44 (Haw. 1993), that refusing to grant marriage licenses to same-sex couples was sex-discrimination under that state's constitution. In response, voters passed Hawaii Constitutional Amendment 2. This amendment differed from future marriage amendments in other states as it did not ban same-sex marriage itself, but merely empowered the state legislature to enact such a ban. In November 1998, 69% of Hawaii voters approved the amendment, and the state legislature exercised its power to ban same-sex marriage. Only three constitutional bans on same-sex unions (in Alaska, Nebraska, and Nevada) were proposed between 1998 and 2003. All three amendments passed. In Massachusetts Supreme Judicial Court's November 2003 decision in Goodridge v. Department of Public Health, the court legalized same-sex marriage in Massachusetts. Social and religious conservatives feared that their own state supreme courts would issue such rulings at some point in the future; in order to prevent this, they proposed additional constitutional bans on same-sex marriage. The following year, eleven constitutional referendums banning same-sex unions were placed on state ballots.

On April 3, 2009, Nate Silver posted his model of the predicted years that each of the 50 states would vote against a marriage ban, with the last one being Mississippi in 2024.

== Purpose and motivation ==
Constitutional bans on same-sex unions were advocated in response to the legalization of same-sex marriage in other jurisdictions, notably Canada and Massachusetts.

Some amendments and some proposed amendments forbade a state from recognizing even non-marital civil unions and domestic partnerships, while others explicitly allowed for same-sex unions that were not called "marriages".

Such amendments had two main purposes:

- Preventing a state's courts interpreting their state's constitution to permit or require legalization of same-sex marriage.
- Preventing a state's courts recognizing same-sex marriages that were legally performed in other jurisdictions.

Some proponents of such amendments feared that states would be forced to recognize same-sex marriages celebrated in other jurisdictions. They pointed to the Full Faith and Credit Clause, which requires each state to recognize the public acts, records, and judicial proceedings of each other state. On the other hand, opponents argued that state constitutional amendments would do nothing to resolve this perceived problem. Traditionally, courts have held that a state is free to decline to recognize a marriage celebrated elsewhere if the marriage violates the state's strong public policy. (§134 of the First Restatement of Conflicts, on Marriage and Legitimacy (1934)). That tradition was broken in 1967 with the Loving v. Virginia case decided by a unanimous Supreme Court, which confirmed that the full faith and credit clause did require recognition of all legal marriages. Similarly, in Obergefell v. Hodges the Supreme Court ruled that the federal constitution required state recognition of same-sex marriages. All state constitutions are trumped by the federal constitution due to the Supremacy Clause.

=== Conservative mobilization ===
State referendums on constitutional bans of same-sex unions have at times been accused of having been used as a "get-out-the-vote" tactic by some Republicans and social conservatives. When voters see that a particular legislative initiative appears on the ballot, they are thought to feel more motivated to turn out to vote, enhancing ballot numbers for other candidates and issues of their party. The presence of these amendments on state ballots has been credited by some as supposedly providing a boost to Republicans in the 2004 election, and the 2004 Ohio amendment in particular has been cited as aiding President George W. Bush's reelection campaign by motivating evangelical social conservatives in the state to go to the polls. President George W. Bush's close political consultant, Karl Rove, has been an enthusiastic proponent and organizer of legislation banning same-sex unions.

After the 2006 elections some activists argued that such referendums were starting to lose their potential to mobilize conservative voters. Kevin Cathcart, director of Lambda Legal pointed to the narrow defeat of Arizona's Proposition 107, which would have rendered civil unions as well as same-sex marriage unconstitutional. Nevertheless, that same election saw seven such amendments pass; these seven included an amendment in Virginia which banned civil unions as well as same-sex marriages.

== Variants ==
Most U.S. state constitutional amendments banning same-sex unions banned civil unions as well as same-sex marriage.

Two marriage amendments differed greatly from all others: Hawaii's and Virginia's. The former gave the Hawaii state legislature the authority to ban same-sex marriages but did not explicitly make such unions unconstitutional. Virginia's amendment not only banned same-sex marriage and civil unions, but arguably rendered any state recognition of private contracts entered into by unmarried couples unconstitutional.

== Approved amendments ==
=== Amendments that ban same-sex marriage ===

State	Year	Support vote %	Title	Amendment (in relevant part)
Alaska	1998	68%	Ballot Measure 2, Joint Resolution 42	To be valid or recognized in this State, a marriage may exist only between one man and one woman.
Mississippi	2004	86%	Mississippi Amendment 1	Marriage may take place and may be valid under the laws of this state only between a man and a woman.
Missouri	2004	71%	Constitutional Amendment 2	To be valid and recognized in this state, a marriage shall exist only between a man and a woman.
Montana	2004	67%	Montana Initiative 96	Only a marriage between one man and one woman shall be valid or recognized as a marriage in this state.
Oregon	2004	57%	Oregon Ballot Measure 36	Only a marriage between one man and one woman shall be valid or legally recognized as a marriage.
Tennessee	2006	81%	Tennessee Amendment 1	The historical institution and legal contract solemnizing the relationship of one man and one woman shall be the only legally recognized marital contract in this state.
Arizona	2008	56%	Arizona Proposition 102	Only a union of one man and one woman shall be valid or recognized as a marriage in this state.

=== Amendments that ban same-sex marriage and civil unions, but not other contracts ===

State	Year	Support vote %	Title	Amendment (in relevant part)
Nebraska	2000	70%	Initiative Measure 416	Only marriage between a man and a woman shall be valid or recognized in Nebraska. The uniting of two persons of the same sex in a civil union, domestic partnership, or other similar same-sex relationship shall not be valid or recognized in Nebraska.
Arkansas	2004	75%	Constitutional Amendment 3	(1) Marriage consists only of the union of one man and one woman. (2) Legal status for unmarried persons which is identical or substantially similar to marital status shall not be valid or recognized in Arkansas.
Georgia	2004	76%	Constitutional Amendment 1	(a) This state shall recognize as marriage only the union of man and woman. Marriages between persons of the same sex are prohibited in this state. (b) No union between persons of the same sex shall be recognized by this state as entitled to the benefits of marriage.
Kentucky	2004	75%	Constitutional Amendment 1	Only a marriage between one man and one woman shall be valid or recognized as a marriage in Kentucky. A legal status identical or substantially similar to that of marriage for unmarried individuals shall not be valid or recognized.
Louisiana	2004	78%	Constitutional Amendment 1	Marriage in the state of Louisiana shall consist only of the union of one man and one woman. No official or court of the state of Louisiana shall construe this constitution or any state law to require that marriage or the legal incidents thereof be conferred upon any member of a union other than the union of one man and one woman. A legal status identical or substantially similar to that of marriage for unmarried individuals shall not be valid or recognized.
North Dakota	2004	73%	North Dakota Constitutional Measure 1	Marriage consists only of the legal union between a man and a woman. No other domestic union, however denominated, may be recognized as a marriage or given the same or substantially equivalent legal effect.
Ohio	2004	62%	State Issue 1	Only a union between one man and one woman may be a marriage valid in or recognized by this state. This state and shall not create or recognize a legal status for relationships of unmarried individuals that intends to approximate the design, qualities, significance or effect of marriage.
Oklahoma	2004	76%	State Question 711	A. Marriage in this state shall consist only of the union of one man and one woman. Neither this Constitution nor any other provision of law shall be construed to require that marital status or the legal incidents thereof be conferred upon unmarried couples or groups. C. Any person knowingly issuing a marriage license in violation of this section shall be guilty of a misdemeanor.
Utah	2004	66%	Constitutional Amendment 3	Marriage consists only of the legal union between a man and a woman. No other domestic union, however denominated, may be recognized as a marriage or given the same or substantially equivalent legal effect.
Kansas	2005	70%	Proposed Amendment 1	(a) Marriage shall be constituted by one man and one woman only. All other marriages are declared to be contrary to the public policy of this state and are void. (b) No relationship, other than a marriage, shall be recognized by the state as entitling the parties to the rights or incidents of marriage.
Texas	2005	76%	Proposition 2	(a) Marriage in this state shall consist only of the union of one man and one woman. (b) This state or a political subdivision of this state may not create or recognize any legal status identical or similar to marriage.
Alabama	2006	81%	Sanctity of Marriage Amendment (Amendment 774)	No marriage license shall be issued in the State of Alabama to parties of the same sex... A union replicating marriage of or between persons of the same sex in the State of Alabama or in any other jurisdiction shall be considered and treated in all respects as having no legal force or effect in this state and shall not be recognized by this state as a marriage or other union replicating marriage.
Idaho	2006	63%	Idaho Amendment 2	A marriage between a man and a woman is the only domestic legal union that shall be valid or recognized in this state.
South Carolina (Note: South Carolina's Amendment explicitly disavows a Virginia-type regime that would affect private contracts: "This section shall not prohibit or limit parties, other than the State or its political subdivisions, from entering into contracts or other legal instruments.")	2006	78%	South Carolina Amendment 1	A marriage between one man and one woman is the only lawful domestic union that shall be valid or recognized in this State. This State...shall not recognize...any other domestic union, however denominated.
South Dakota	2006	52%	South Dakota Amendment C	Only marriage between a man and a woman shall be valid or recognized in South Dakota. The uniting of two or more persons in a civil union, domestic partnership, or other quasi-marital relationship shall not be valid or recognized in South Dakota.
Wisconsin	2006	59%	Wisconsin Referendum 1	Only a marriage between one man and one woman shall be valid or recognized as a marriage in this state. A legal status identical or substantially similar to that of marriage for unmarried individuals shall not be valid or recognized in this state.
Florida	2008	62%	Florida Amendment 2	Inasmuch as marriage is the legal union of one man and one woman as husband and wife, no other legal union that is treated as marriage or the substantial equivalent thereof shall be valid or recognized.
North Carolina	2012	61%	North Carolina Amendment 1	Marriage between one man and one woman is the only domestic legal union that shall be valid or recognized in this State. This section does not prohibit a private party from entering into contracts with another private party; nor does this section prohibit courts from adjudicating the rights of private parties pursuant to such contracts.

=== Amendments that ban same-sex marriage, civil unions, and other contracts ===

State	Year	Support vote %	Title	Amendment
Michigan	2004	59%	State Proposal - 04-2	To secure and preserve the benefits of marriage for our society and for future generations of children, the union of one man and one woman in marriage shall be the only agreement recognized as a marriage or similar union for any purpose.

== Repealed amendments ==

State	Year	Support vote %	Title	Amendment (in relevant part)
Nevada (ban)	2000, 2002	70%, 67%	Nevada Question 2	2002 Nevada Question 2: Only a marriage between a male and female person shall be recognized and given effect in this state.
Nevada (repeal)	2020	62%	Nevada Question 2	2020 Nevada Question 2: "1. The State of Nevada and its political subdivisions shall recognize marriages and issue marriage licenses to couples regardless of gender. 2. Religious organizations and members of the clergy have the right to refuse to solemnize a marriage, and no person has the right to make any claim against a religious organization or member of the clergy for such a refusal. 3. All legally valid marriages must be treated equally under the law."
Hawaii (ban)	1998	69%	Hawaii Amendment 2	Constitutional Amendment 2: "The legislature shall have the power to reserve marriage to opposite-sex couples."
Hawaii (repeal)	2024	56%	Hawaii Amendment 1	Constitutional Amendment 1: repeals Constitutional Amendment 2
Colorado (ban)	2006	55%	Colorado Amendment 43	Colorado Amendment 43: "Only a marriage between one man and one woman shall be valid or recognized as a marriage in this state."
Colorado (repeal)	2024	64%	Colorado Amendment J	Colorado Amendment J: repeals Colorado Amendment 43
California (ban)	2008	52%	California Proposition 8	California Proposition 8: "Only marriage between a man and a woman is valid or recognized in California."
California (repeal)	2024	63%	California Proposition 3	California Proposition 3: "(a) The right to marry is a fundamental right. (b) This section is in furtherance of both of the following: (1) The inalienable rights to enjoy life and liberty and to pursue and obtain safety, happiness, and privacy guaranteed by Section 1. (2) The rights to due process and equal protection guaranteed by Section 7."
Virginia (ban)	2006	57%	Virginia Question 1	That only a union between one man and one woman may be a marriage valid in or recognized by this Commonwealth and its political subdivisions. This Commonwealth and its political subdivisions shall not create or recognize a legal status for relationships of unmarried individuals that intends to approximate the design, qualities, significance, or effects of marriage. Nor shall this Commonwealth or its political subdivisions create or recognize another union, partnership, or other legal status to which is assigned the rights, benefits, obligations, qualities, or effects of marriage.
Virginia (repeal)	2026	58%	Virginia Question 2	Virginia Question 2 modifies the previous amendment to require the state to recognize marriages without regard to sex, gender, or race.

== Failed amendments ==
- Arizona Proposition 107 – On November 7, 2006, Arizona rejected a constitutional amendment banning same-sex marriage and civil unions by 51.8% of the vote. Two years later Arizona voters approved a more narrow amendment banning only same-sex marriage.
- Minnesota Amendment 1 – On November 6, 2012, Minnesota rejected a constitutional amendment banning gay marriage with 51.90% of the electorate opposed. A majority of all votes cast would be required to amend the state constitution.

== Obergefell v. Hodges ==
On June 26, 2015 the U.S. Supreme Court ruled in Obergefell that state laws banning same-sex marriage violate the Due Process Clause and the Equal Protection Clause of the Fourteenth Amendment, rendering such laws unconstitutional and invalidating the remaining 14 same-sex marriage bans still being fully or partially enforced. (Note: Prior to Obergefell Alabama and Kansas had one or more court ruling invalidating the state's same-sex marriage bans but were not fully complying with the rulings.)

As of 2016, bills have been introduced in Virginia and other states to legislatively repeal the null-and-void amendments.

== See also ==
- Same-sex marriage law in the United States by state
