= 2004 North Dakota Constitutional Measure 1 =

Constitutional Measure 1
- November 2, 2004
- North Dakota Definition of Marriage Initiative

Results
Choice	Votes	%
Yes	223,538	73.23%
No	81,708	26.77%
Valid votes	305,246	96.59%
Invalid or blank votes	10,770	3.41%
Total votes	316,016	100.00%
Registered voters/turnout	487,010	62.68%
- Yes 80–90% 70–80% 60–70%

North Dakota Constitutional Measure 1 of 2004, is an amendment to the North Dakota Constitution that makes it unconstitutional for the state to recognize or perform same-sex marriages or civil unions. The referendum was approved by 73% of the voters.

The text of the amendment states:

Marriage consists only of the legal union between a man and a woman. No other domestic union, however denominated, may be recognized as a marriage or given the same or substantially equivalent legal effect.

Due to the Supreme Court's 2015 ruling in Obergefell v. Hodges (576 U.S. 644), which legalized same-sex marriage across the United States, this amendment is unenforceable.

== Results ==
Measure 1
Choice	Votes	%
For	223,572	73.23
Against	81,716	26.77
Total	305,288	100.00
Registered voters/turnout	482,722	63.24

== See also ==
- LGBT rights in North Dakota
