= 2020 Virginia elections =

- November 3, 2020

Virginia state elections in 2020 was held on Tuesday, November 3, 2020. With the exception of its Democratic Party presidential primary election held on March 3, 2020 (its Republican Party presidential primary was cancelled by the state party), its primary elections were held on June 23 of that year.

In addition to the U.S. presidential race, Virginia voters will elect their Class II U.S. senator and all of its seats to the House of Representatives. There were also two ballot measures which were voted on.

The state deadline for voter registration was extended for two extra days "after a severed fiber-optic cable kept voters from registering online" on October 13.

To vote by mail, registered Virginia voters must request a ballot by October 23 (remotely) or by October 31, 2020 (in-person). As of early October some 1,562,706 voters have requested mail ballots.

== Federal offices ==
=== President of the United States ===
Virginia has 13 electoral votes in the Electoral College.

=== United States House of Representatives ===
There are 10 U.S. Representatives in Virginia that will be up for election. Another seat is open after the incumbent, Denver Riggleman, lost renomination in its Republican convention. Republican primary conventions were held instead of primaries at differing dates for each district.

== Ballot measures ==
=== Question 1 ===
Question 1, Redistricting Commission is to amend the state constitution so that the redistricting process for federal and local elections is no longer left to the state legislature but instead delegated to a commission selected by a panel of judges largely selected by majority and minority party leaders in the state legislature. The initiative is supported by both Democrats and Republicans and has the support of the Virginia AARP and ACLU. It is opposed by the state Democratic Party and some elected Democrats on the grounds that it would give inordinate power to the judges tasked with selecting citizens for the commission and that the system would not guarantee the representation of minorities on the commission.

In August 2020, former Virginia Democratic chairman and candidate for lieutenant governor in 2021 Paul Goldman wrote a letter to the Virginia Department of Elections, arguing the wording of the question was misleading. The Virginia Supreme Court rejected this challenge saying that the Department of Elections must put the question on the ballot with the wording agreed to by the legislature.

=== Question 2 ===
Question 2
- November 3, 2020
- Should an automobile or pickup truck that is owned and used primarily by or for a veteran of the United States armed forces or the Virginia National Guard who has a one hundred percent service-connected, permanent, and total disability be free from state and local taxation?

Results
Choice	Votes	%
Yes	3,713,771	85.99%
No	605,216	14.01%
Total votes	4,318,987	100.00%
Registered voters/turnout	5,975,752	72.28%
- County and independent city results Yes—70–80% Yes—80–90% Yes—>90%

Question 2, Motor Vehicle Property Tax Exemption for Disabled Veterans asks if an automobile or pickup truck that is owned by a veteran of the US military or Virginia National Guard with a disability that is 100% service related should have that vehicle be exempt from local and state property taxes.

Question 2 passed with a majority of voters in every county and independent city voting in favor of it.
