= 2020 Florida Amendment 4 =

- Require Amendments Pass Twice

Results
Choice	Votes	%
Yes	4,842,690	47.53%
No	5,347,025	52.47%
Valid votes	10,189,715	91.43%
Invalid or blank votes	955,140	8.57%
Total votes	11,144,855	100.00%
Registered voters/turnout	14,441,869	77.17%

No
90–100%
80–90%
70–80%
60–70%
50–60%
Yes
90–100%
80–90%
70–80%
60–70%
50–60%
Other
Tie
No data

2020 Florida Amendment 4, commonly known as the Think Twice Initiative was a proposed amendment to the Constitution of Florida that failed by 52.47% to 47.53% in the 2020 election on November 3, 2020. The amendment would have required new constitutional amendments to be approved by voters twice in order to go into effect.

== Overview ==
Amendment 4 proposed that constitutional amendments to be approved by voters at two successive general elections to become effective. Currently in Florida, if voters approve an amendment at one general election, it becomes part of the constitution.

In Florida, constitutional amendments require a 60% supermajority vote to become effective. This requirement was added to the constitution in 2006. Under Amendment 4, the supermajority requirement would apply to both elections.

== Background ==
Amendment 4 was placed on the ballot of Florida's 2020 elections due to the efforts of Keep Our Constitution Clean, an organization founded in 2018 with the stated purpose being to "counter misleading proposals being placed in front of voters..." The organization raised $8 Million from a nonprofit group which shares its name, Keep Our Constitution Clean, Inc., which is not required to report its contributors under state or federal regulations. The organization paid volunteers up to $18 an hour to collect signatures for the amendment, alongside bonuses based on the number of collected signatures, with potential earnings of $3,220 if a volunteer worked 40 hours a week and collected 750 signatures which is far greater pay than petition organizations.

The organization is run by Jason H. Haber, a Fort Lauderdale attorney and chairman of the Republicans Against Green Energy PAC.

== Impact ==
The 2020 Florida Amendment 4 (which is separate from the 2018 Amendment 4 to restore felon voting rights currently being reviewed by the courts), was a proposed amendment that would have required all future constitutional amendments to be approved in elections twice. Had it passed, the likely outcome of this change would have been fewer amendments proposed and fewer amendments approved. Constitutional amendments need to gather 60% in each voting to be approved.

Florida's current standard of a 60% approval for amendments is much higher than the threshold needed in most states. If Florida Amendment 4 passes, Florida would be joining Nevada as the only other state with this requirement, though Nevada only requires amendments to be passed twice with 50%. The president of The League of Women Voters of Florida, Patricia Brigham claims, "This would basically shut the door to citizen groups other than the wealthiest of the wealthy to get an amendment on the ballot, You make it a lot harder for citizens to have their say on issues the legislature does not address. We're non-partisan but when you have a one-party rule no matter what the party for a long, long time, then you cut off a number of voters from having a voice."

Since 1962, Nevada has had an incredibly low number of constitutional amendments, with only 14 citizen-initiated amendments passed at the first election, and 12 of those passing at the second round. The Florida amendment process would likely follow in Nevada's footsteps with these much lower numbers, should Florida Amendment 4 become law.

The main campaign in support of Florida Amendment 4 is led by Keep Our Constitution Clean PC, a PAC run by Matthew Meyers of Miami, and Jason H. Haber and Jason Blank of Fort Lauderdale. Atty. Jason Zimmerman of The PAC states the amendment is necessary to "reduce whimsical constitutional amendments." Zimmerman cited the great difference in number of amendments between the Florida constitution, with 140 amendments since the 1960s, and the US constitution, with 27 since the 1700s. The PAC is backed by a non-profit with essentially the same name, Keep Our Constitution Clean Inc. The non-profit has raised almost $9 million for the campaign, but they have not disclosed who the money is coming from. This lack of information means voters do not know who is funding the campaign and what their motives are.

The main groups campaigning against Florida Amendment 4 include the AFL-CIO, ACLU of Florida, LWVFL, BAWN: Ban Assault Weapons Now, SPLC Action Fund, and Florida Rights Restoration Coalition.

It takes a multi-million-dollar effort to get enough signatures for an amendment to even make it on the ballot. Out of the six amendments in 2020, two have sponsors that have spent millions to get them on the ballot. Aubrey Jewett, author of the Politics in Florida textbook, says he supported the increase from 50% to 60% voter approval in 2006, but he worries Florida Amendment 4 is taking it too far. He says he is "a little concerned that maybe we're...making it a little too difficult for people to exercise direct democracy", which is "part of the checks and balances in the Florida system."

The Florida constitutional amendment process is one way that Floridians can get their voices heard, and ensure the constitution reflects their values and beliefs. Past citizen-led initiatives include ending smoking in workplaces, curbing property taxes, and putting an end to inhumane animal farms. Florida Amendment 4 would have required amendments to go through the current constitutional amendment process twice in order to get onto the Florida ballot, potentially increasing the time it takes for voter approved changes to be made to the constitution.

As it appeared on the Florida ballot on November 6, 2018, the text of the amendment read:

provided by the Florida Division of Elections. A 60 percent vote in favor was required for approval.

== Implementation ==
· A "yes" on the ballot supports requiring all proposed future amendments or revisions to the state constitution to be approved by voters in two elections, instead of one, in order to take effect. · A "no" on the ballot would keep the requirement that all proposed amendments or revisions to the state constitution be approved by voters in one election, instead of two, in order to take effect.

== Opposition ==
=== Opponents ===
==== Political parties ====
- Miami Dade Democratic Party

==== Organizations ====
- ACLU of Florida
- League of Women Voters of Florida

=== Arguments ===
- Ellen Freidin of Fair Districts Florida: "We cannot let our guard down and allow the powerful to indulge their worst tendencies to grab all the control for themselves. Florida voters should see Number 4 for what it is, a shameless effort to take away the people's control over what goes into our constitution. We simply cannot give up our most effective tool for change."
- ACLU of Florida: "Florida voters' right to participate directly in our democracy is protected by Florida's constitution. Yet, Ballot initiative #4 would impede that right and make it twice as hard and twice as expensive for Floridians' voices to be heard." Ballot Initiative #4, disingenuously and misleadingly titled "Voter Approval of Constitutional Amendments," is a cynical political effort to obstruct voters' ability to pass future constitutional amendments, even those with support from a supermajority of voters. This ballot initiative disregards the will of the people and renders their voices mute on the very issues they care about most. Essentially, an amendment approved by Florida voters would not count unless it passed a second time in the next election. In other words, it negates the will of the people and requires them to try again a second time in order to get something passed. It is an effort to stifle the choices Floridians have made to improve our democracy. Florida voters have a right to participate directly in our democracy and that right is protected by Florida's constitution. Yet, Ballot Initiative #4 would impede that right and make it harder for Floridians voices to be heard."

== Media editorials ==
=== Opposition ===
- Sun Sentinel Editorial Board: "Amendment 4 is as bad as bad gets. It takes massive effort and money to get a constitutional amendment ratified, particularly with the 60 percent approval threshold. One election is enough. There is no good reason to make it twice as hard. ... Talk about keeping our Constitution clean, this initiative is unnecessary. It is political clickbait offered up by wealthy friends of President Donald Trump to echo his anti-immigrant agenda and lure like-minded voters to the polls."
- Orlando Sentinel Editorial Board: "If No. 4 passes, back-to-back campaigns would become far too expensive for grass-roots organizations that want to change the constitution, while the opponents would get an automatic do-over. Citizens would be thrown out of the amendment ballgame, and the backers of No. 4 know that. ... No. 4 is nothing more than the latest attack in a long, relentless war — waged by the Florida Chamber of Commerce and their pals in the state Legislature — to cut regular Floridians out of the amendment process."
- Herald-Tribune Editorial Board: "[T]his is an attempt at major mischief. Political operatives who dislike voters' ability to send direct orders to their Legislature through the amendment process would prefer to make the process more cumbersome and expensive and, above all, protracted. They want you to have to vote on every amendment proposal not once, but twice, so you can second-guess yourself in their favor. We recommend voting no."
- Miami Herald Editorial Board: "The odious goal of this proposal is to require constitutional amendments to be approved by the voters in two — two! — general elections in order to become effective. ... Its well-heeled backers want Floridians to have to vote twice, cynically betting on the real possibility that an amendment won't get that supermajority the second time around. As bad faith goes, this is voter suppression at its finest. Vote NO on Amendment 4."
- Gainesville Sun Editorial Board: "Amendment No. 4 on the ballot this fall would be the death knell for direct democracy in Florida. Voters should keep our state constitution free of this attempt by big-money interests to subvert the power of the people."
- Florida Today Editorial Board: "Getting a proposal on the ballot is already a difficult and expensive task that requires the gathering of at least 766,200 petition signatures. Not to mention the Legislature has steadily made it harder to get initiatives on the ballot by, for example, limiting the amount of time a group has to collect signatures. If Amendment 4 passes, it's likely that only groups with a lot of money and backing from powerful interests would be able to amend the Florida Constitution."
- Tampa Bay Times Editorial Board: "[T]here already are high hurdles for placing an amendment on the ballot; proposals by the Legislature need support by three-fifths of the membership, revision commissions meet only every 20 years and citizens' initiatives face a host of financial and logistical barriers. Lawmakers also routinely ignore amendments that Florida voters approve (see: Conservation Lands, Felons' Voting Rights). This is just another tool for the ruling class to remain unanswerable and out-of-touch. The Times Editorial Board recommends a No vote on Amendment 4."

== Campaign finance ==
One committee is registered to support Amendment 4: Keep Our Constitution Clean PC. The committee reported $165,500 in cash contributions and $8.84 million in in-kind contributions, all from Keep Our Constitution Clean, Inc. The committee reported 160,131.36 in cash expenditures.

Keep Our Constitution Clean PC reported in-kind contributions from Keep Our Constitution Clean, Inc. for signature gathering totaling $8.8 million. The total cost per required signature (CPRS) for Amendment 4 was $11.48.

=== Support ===
Committees in support of Amendment 4
Committee	Cash Contributions	In-Kind Contributions	Total Contributions	Cash Expenditures	Total Expenditures
Keep Our Constitution Clean PC	$165,500.00	$8,844,646.76	$9,010,146.76	$160,230.36	$9,004,877.12
Total	$165,500.00	$8,844,646.76	$9,010,146.76	$160,230.36	$9,004,877.12

== See also ==
- Elections in Florida
- 2020 Florida elections
