= 2020 Iowa Question 1 =

Question 1
- Iowa Constitutional Convention Question

Results
Choice	Votes	%
Yes	408,746	29.58%
No	972,930	70.42%
Valid votes	1,381,676	81.27%
Invalid or blank votes	318,454	18.73%
Total votes	1,700,130	100.00%
- County results Against 80%–90% 70%–80% 60%–70%

2020 Iowa Question 1, the Iowa Constitutional Convention Question, was a ballot measure in Iowa held on November 3, 2020, to hold a constitutional convention to revise the Constitution of Iowa. It was defeated with 70% of the vote against.

== Background ==
The Iowa Constitution specifies that every ten years there should be a ballot measure asking if there should be a constitutional convention.

== Contents ==
The measure appeared on ballots as follows, as the Iowa Constitution requires:

Shall there be a convention to revise the Constitution, and propose amendment or amendments to same?

== Results ==
Question 1
Choice	Votes	%
For	408,746	29.58
Against	972,930	70.42
Total	1,381,676	100.00
Valid votes	1,381,676	81.27
Invalid/blank votes	318,454	18.73
Total votes	1,700,130	100.00
