= 2020 Rhode Island Question 1 =

Question 1
- Changing the Official Name of the State

Results
Choice	Votes	%
Yes	247,261	53.12%
No	218,175	46.88%
Total votes	465,436	100.00%

Yes
90–100%
80–90%
70–80%
60–70%
50–60%
No
90–100%
60–70%
50–60%
Other
Tie
No data

Question 1 was a 2020 ballot measure in Rhode Island to change the official name of the state from State of Rhode Island and Providence Plantations to State of Rhode Island. The proposal passed with 53% of the vote.

== Background ==
The state was officially named the "State of Rhode Island and Providence Plantations" when it declared statehood in 1790. Over time it became commonly known as simply "Rhode Island".

The General Assembly voted in 2009 to hold a referendum in November 2010 on removing "and Providence Plantations" from the official name. Supporters of the change argued that the word "plantation" is associated in modern English with slavery, while opponents pointed out that "plantation" in this context is simply an archaic synonym of "colony" or "settlement". The people voted overwhelmingly (78% to 22%) against the change.

In June 2020, Governor Gina Raimondo signed an executive order to remove the phrase "Providence Plantations" from all official state documents. Raimondo wrote, "Many of the State's residents find it painful that a word so closely associated with slavery should appear in the official name of the State [...] the pain that this association causes to some of our residents should be of concern to all Rhode Islanders and we should do everything in our power to ensure that all communities can take pride in our State[.]" However, changing the state's full official name required a state constitutional amendment that needed to be approved by voters. Raimondo "urge[d] the voters to approve the name change".

== Results ==
Question 1
Choice	Votes	%
For	247,261	53.12
Against	218,175	46.88
Total	465,436	100.00

=== By county ===
County	Yes		No		Margin		Total votes
County	#	%	#	%	#	%	Total votes
Bristol	14,656	56.0%	11,503	44.0%	3,153	12.0%	26,159
Kent	39,860	45.9%	46,893	54.1%	-7,033	-8.2%	86,753
Newport	23,218	54.7%	19,223	45.3%	3,995	9.4%	42,441
Providence	133,206	55.7%	106,060	44.3%	27,146	11.4%	239,266
Washington	36,321	51.3%	34,496	48.7%	1,825	2.7%	70,817
Totals	247,261	53.12%	218,175	46.88%	29,086	6.24%	465,436
