= 2002 Nevada Question 2 =

American anti-gay marriage ballot measure

Ballot Question 2
- November 5, 2002
- Protection of Marriage Initiative

Results
Choice	Votes	%
Yes	337,197	67.20%
No	164,573	32.80%
Valid votes	501,770	97.92%
Invalid or blank votes	10,663	2.08%
Total votes	512,433	100.00%
Registered voters/turnout	869,859	57.68%
County results
Yes
80%–90%
70%–80%
60%–70%

Ballot Question 2
- November 7, 2000
- Protection of Marriage Initiative

Results
Choice	Votes	%
Yes	412,688	69.62%
No	180,077	30.38%
Valid votes	592,765	96.64%
Invalid or blank votes	20,595	3.36%
Total votes	613,360	100.00%
Registered voters/turnout	874,304	67.8%
County results
Yes
80%–90%
70%–80%
60%–70%

Question 2 of 2000 and 2002 is a ballot measure that amended the Nevada Constitution that prevented same-sex marriages from being conducted or recognized in Nevada. The amendment was passed on November 5, 2002. In 2020 the amendment was repealed by voters in the 2020 Question 2 that protect same-sex marriage. The Nevada Constitution requires two ballot votes for citizen-initiated constitutional amendments.

== Campaign ==
The measure was heavily influenced by the Church of Jesus Christ of Latter-day Saints (LDS church). A Nevada Mormon newspaper Beehive first reported the Coalition for the Protection of Marriage's intent to file an initiative petition in December 1999, and by October 2000 the coalition had raised over $800,000 from mostly Mormon-owned businesses and LDS individuals. Mormon leaders had strongly encouraged members through letters with church letterhead to do campaign work and post yard signs distributed at church buildings.

== Text ==
The text of the adopted amendment, which is found at Article I, section 21 of the Nevada Constitution, states:

Only a marriage between a male and female person shall be recognized and given effect in this state.

== Polling ==
Poll source	Date(s) administered	Sample size (Note: Key: A – all adults RV – registered voters LV – likely voters V – unclear)	Margin of error	Yes	No	Other
SurveyUSA	October 27–29, 2002	530 (LV)	± 4.4%	62%	37%	1%

== Result ==
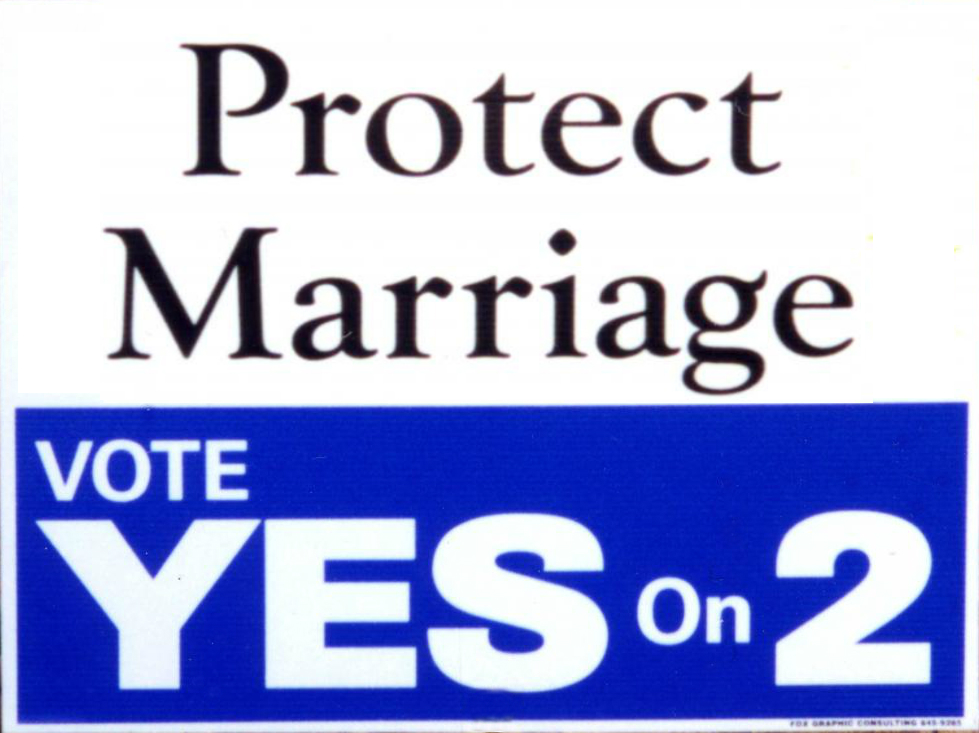
Sign by the Coalition for the Protection of Marriage

=== 2000 ===
Ballot Question 2
Choice	Votes	%
For	412,688	69.62
Against	180,077	30.38
Total	592,765	100.00
Registered voters/turnout	874,304	67.8

=== 2002 ===
Ballot Question 2
Choice	Votes	%
For	337,197	67.20
Against	164,573	32.80
Total	501,770	100.00
Registered voters/turnout	869,859	57.68

== Aftermath ==
2020 Nevada Question 2 was a ballot measure to replace Article I, section 21 with language that requires the recognition of same-sex marriage in Nevada. It was passed on November 3, 2020, with 62% of the vote, making Nevada the first state in United States to enshrine the right to same-sex marriage in a state constitution.

== See also ==
- Sevcik v. Sandoval — a case challenging Article I, Section 21
