= Chris Brooks (politician) =

American politician (born 1972)

Member of the Nevada Senate from the 3rd district
- In office December 4, 2018 – November 2022
- Preceded by: Tick Segerblom
- Succeeded by: Rochelle Nguyen

Member of the Nevada Assembly from the 10th district
- In office November 9, 2016 – December 4, 2018
- Preceded by: Shelly M. Shelton
- Succeeded by: Rochelle Nguyen

Personal details
- Born: 1972 (age 53–54) Las Vegas, Nevada, US
- Party: Democratic
- Spouse: Michelle White
- Children: 3

Christopher Lee Brooks (born 1972) is a former Democratic member of the Nevada Senate who represented District 3 in Clark County. He previously served in the Nevada Assembly from 2016 to 2018. He represented the 10th district, which covers parts of the central Las Vegas Valley.

== Biography ==
Brooks was born in 1972 in Las Vegas. He has worked for a variety of electrical and energy companies, and currently serves as Managing Principal of Brooks Consulting, a position he has held since 2016.

Brooks ran for the Assembly in 2016 for the seat held by Republican Shelly M. Shelton. He defeated German Castellanos in the Democratic primary and Shelton in the general election.

Brooks was appointed to the Nevada Senate in 2018 to represent the 3rd district. He resigned from the Senate in 2022 to take a private-sector position.

== Personal life ==
Brooks has three children: Arielle, Alan, and Calvin, and two grandchildren; he is married to Michelle White.

== Political positions ==
Brooks supports a $15 minimum wage. He received a 100% rating from Nevada Advocates for Planned Parenthood Affiliates and a 0% rating from the NRA Political Victory Fund.

== Electoral history ==
Nevada Assembly District 10 Democratic primary, 2016
| Party | Candidate | Votes | % |
|---|---|---|---|
| Democratic | Chris Brooks | 1,468 | 71.6% |
| Democratic | German Castellanos | 583 | 28.4% |
| Total votes | | 2,051 | 100.0% |

Nevada Assembly District 10 General election, 2016
| Party | Candidate | Votes | % |
|---|---|---|---|
| Democratic | Chris Brooks | 10,910 | 63.5% |
| Republican | Shelly M. Shelton | 6,273 | 36.5% |
| Total votes | | 17,183 | 100.0% |

Nevada's 3rd Senate District General election, 2018
| Party | Candidate | Votes | % |
|---|---|---|---|
| Democratic | Chris Brooks | 9,179 | 63.7 |
| Republican | Noel Searles | 4,757 | 33.0 |
| Independent American | Jonathan Friedrich | 469 | 3.3 |
| Total votes | | 14,405 | 100.0 |
