= 2020 Florida Amendment 6 =

Amendment 6
- Ad Valorem Tax Discount for Spouses of Certain Deceased Veterans Who Had Permanent, Combat-Related Disabilities

Results
| Choice | Votes | % |
|---|---|---|
| Yes | 9,305,503 | 89.73% |
| No | 1,065,308 | 10.27% |
| Valid votes | 10,370,811 | 93.05% |
| Invalid or blank votes | 774,044 | 6.95% |
| Total votes | 11,144,855 | 100.00% |
| Registered voters/turnout | 14,441,869 | 77.17% |

Yes
90–100%
80–90%
70–80%
60–70%
50–60%
No
90–100%
60–70%
Other
Tie
No data

2020 Florida Amendment 6 was a proposed amendment to the Constitution of Florida that passed in the 2020 election on November 3, 2020.

== Overview ==
Several major regional newspapers endorsed the amendment, including Florida Today, TCPalm, the Palm Beach Post, the Miami Herald, the Orlando Suntinel, the Sun Sentinel, and the Tampa Bay Times. According to the Tampa Bay Times, "Amendment 6 honors surviving spouses of older veterans who were disabled while fighting for their country. It deserves to pass."

A poll conducted by the University of North Florida prior to election accurately predicted 89% support for the amendment, with 8% of voters opposed and 4% of voters undecided. It found highest support for the amendment among Black voters at 96%, and above 80% support for all age groups and partisan affiliations.

== Background ==
According to First Coast News, the amendment received unanimous support from state legislators.

== Results ==
The amendment easily received majority support, with almost 90% of statewide voters approving the measure. However, support was lower in some parts of the Panhandle and urban Florida, with support in Alachua County, the home of the University of Florida, at 83.7%. Support for the measure was highest in Southwestern Gulf Coast counties including Sarasota County and Collier County, which both saw 92.4% support for the amendment.

== See also ==
- Elections in Florida
- 2020 Florida elections
