= Rochelle Nguyen =

American politician and attorney

Member of the Nevada Senate from the 3rd district
- Incumbent
- Assumed office December 20, 2022
- Preceded by: Chris Brooks

Member of the Nevada Assembly from the 10th district
- In office December 18, 2018 – December 20, 2022
- Preceded by: Chris Brooks
- Succeeded by: Sabra Newby

Personal details
- Born: Rochelle Thuy Nguyen; September 13, 1977 (age 48) Vancouver, Washington, U.S.
- Party: Democratic
- Education: University of Puget Sound (BA); University of Nevada, Las Vegas (JD)

Rochelle Nguyen is an American politician and attorney serving as a member of the Nevada Senate, representing the 3rd district. She previously served in the Nevada Assembly representing the 10th district, which includes a portion of Las Vegas.

== Early life and education ==
Nguyen was born on September 13, 1977 in Vancouver, Washington. She earned a Bachelor of Arts from the University of Puget Sound and a Juris Doctor from the William S. Boyd School of Law at the University of Nevada, Las Vegas.

== Career ==
After graduating from law school, Nguyen became a member of the State Bar of Nevada. She worked for three years in the Clark County Public Defender's Office before establishing her own criminal defense practice. In December 2018, Nguyen was appointed to the Nevada Assembly to fill the seat left vacant by Chris Brooks. Four years later she was appointed to replace Brooks after his resignation from the Nevada Senate.
