= 2014 Nevada elections =

- November 4, 2014

Elections were held in Nevada on November 4, 2014. On that date, the state held elections for Governor, Lieutenant Governor, Attorney General, Secretary of State, Treasurer, Controller, U.S. House of Representatives, Nevada Senate, Nevada Assembly, and various others. In addition, several measures were on the ballot.

The active political parties participated in the 2014 election were the two major political parties, the Democratic Party and the Republican Party as well as the minor political parties of the Independent American Party of Nevada, the Nevada Green Party, and the Libertarian Party of Nevada. There are also unaffiliated, non-partisan candidates.

In the 2014 general election in Nevada, Republican candidates won all statewide executive offices, majorities in both state legislative chambers, and 3 out of 4 U.S. House seats.

== United States House of Representatives ==
All of Nevada's four seats in the United States House of Representatives were up for election in 2014.

== Governor ==
Incumbent Republican governor Brian Sandoval ran for re-election to a second term in office and won. He was challenged by Democratic nominee Bob Goodman, a former State Economic Development Commissioner and Independent American nominee David Lory VanDerBeek, a family therapist.

Nevada gubernatorial election, 2014
Party	Candidate	Votes	%
Republican	Brian Sandoval (incumbent)	386,340	70.58
Democratic	Bob Goodman	130,722	23.88
None of These Candidates		15,751	2.88
Independent American	David Lory VanDerBeek	14,536	2.66
Total votes		547,349	100.0
Republican hold			

== Lieutenant governor ==
Incumbent Republican lieutenant governor Brian Krolicki was term-limited for life and could not seek re-election to a third term in office. Republican state senator Mark Hutchison defeated Democratic state assemblywoman Lucy Flores in the general election.

2014 Nevada lieutenant gubernatorial election
Party	Candidate	Votes	%
Republican	Mark Hutchison	324,443	59.47
Democratic	Lucy Flores	183,571	33.65
Independent American	Mike Little	21,221	3.89
None of These Candidates		16,298	2.99
Total votes		545,533	100.0
Republican hold			

== Attorney general ==
Incumbent Democratic Attorney General Catherine Cortez Masto was ineligible to run for re-election for a third term due to term limits from the Constitution of Nevada. Republican attorney Adam Laxalt defeated Democratic secretary of state Ross Miller with 46.2% of the vote.

Until the 2022 Nevada gubernatorial election, this was the most recent time a Republican won a Nevada statewide election while carrying neither Clark nor Washoe Counties.

2014 Nevada Attorney General election
Party	Candidate	Votes	%	±%
Republican	Adam Laxalt	251,479	46.20	+10.53
Democratic	Ross Miller	246,629	45.32	–7.50
Independent American	Jonathan Hansen	30,513	5.61	–2.20
None of These Candidates		15,629	2.87	−0.83
Total votes		544,150	100.00	
Republican gain from Democratic		Swing		

== Secretary of State ==
Incumbent Democratic secretary of state Ross Miller was prevented from running for re-election to a third term in office due to constitutional lifetime term limits. As of 2023, this is the most recent statewide election in which Mineral County was won by the Democratic candidate for public office.

=== Results ===
Nevada Secretary of State election, 2014
Party	Candidate	Votes	%
Republican	Barbara Cegavske	273,720	50.40
Democratic	Kate Marshall	250,612	46.14
None of These Candidates		18,778	3.46
Total votes		543,110	100.0
Republican gain from Democratic			

== Treasurer ==
2014 Nevada State Treasurer election
- November 4, 2014
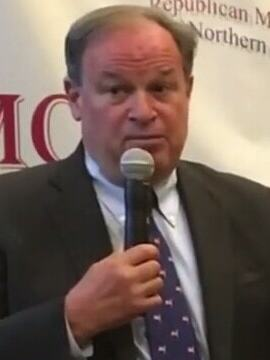

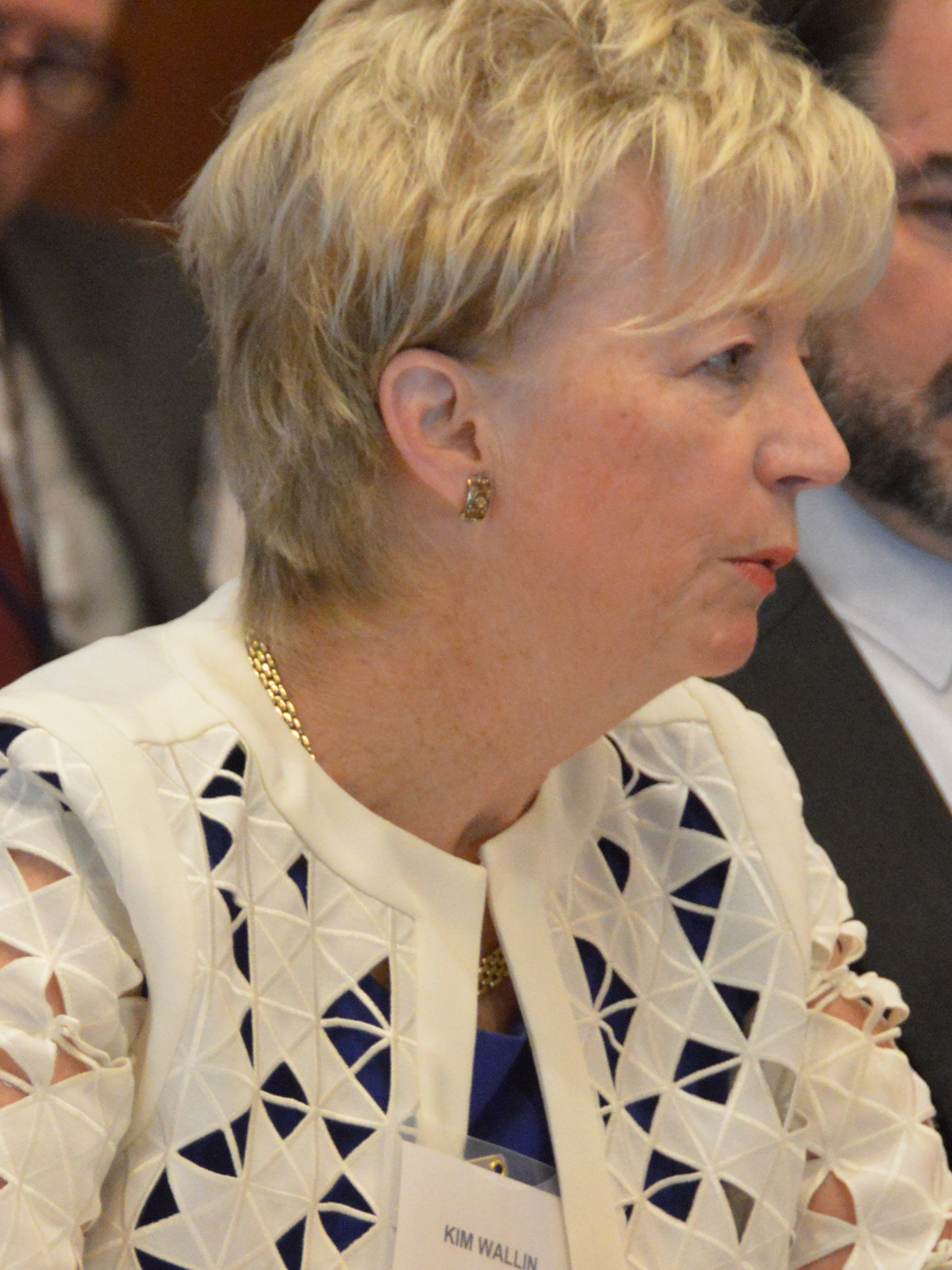
Nominee	Dan Schwartz	Kim Wallin
Party	Republican	Democratic
Popular vote	277,450	223,750
Percentage	51.45%	41.50%
- County results Schwartz: 40–50% 50–60% 60–70% 70–80%
State Treasurer before election
Kate Marshall
Democratic
Elected State Treasurer
Dan Schwartz
Republican

Incumbent Democratic state treasurer Kate Marshall was prevented from running for re-election to a third term in office due to constitutional lifetime term limits.

=== Democratic ===
- Kim Wallin, Nevada State Controller

=== Republican ===
- Dan Schwartz, businessman and candidate for Nevada's 4th congressional district in 2012

=== Independent American ===
- Kress Cave

=== General election ===
==== Polling ====
Poll source	Date(s) administered	Sample size	Margin of error	Kim Wallin (D)	Dan Schwartz (R)	Other	Undecided
Precision Research	March 3–5, 2014	216	± 6.67%	33%	38%	—	28%

==== Results ====
2014 Nevada State Treasurer election
Party	Candidate	Votes	%	±%
Republican	Dan Schwartz	277,450	51.45%	+7.63%
Democratic	Kim Wallin	223,750	41.50%	−6.81%
Independent American	Kress Cave	19,346	3.59%	−0.46%
None of These Candidates		18,668	3.46%	-0.37%
Total votes		539,214	100.0%	
Republican gain from Democratic				

== Controller ==
2014 Nevada State Controller election
- November 4, 2014
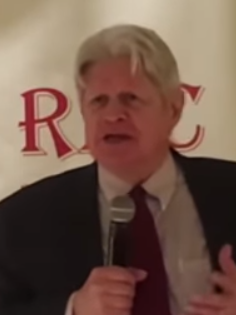

Nominee	Ron Knecht	Andrew Martin	Tom Jones
Party	Republican	Democratic	Independent American
Popular vote	282,674	202,573	29,108
Percentage	52.53%	37.64%	5.4%
- County results Knecht: 40–50% 50–60% 60–70%
State Controller before election
Kim Wallin
Democratic
Elected State Controller
Ron Knecht
Republican

Incumbent Democratic Controller Kim Wallin was prevented from running for re-election to a third term in office due to constitutional lifetime term limits.

=== Democratic ===
Declared

- Andrew Martin, state assemblyman

Disqualified

- Mike Schaefer, perennial candidate and former San Diego, California City Councilman (disqualified by the Nevada Supreme Court because he did not meet the residency requirements)

=== Republican primary ===
==== Candidates ====
- Cort Arlint, licensed tax attorney, CPA and university accounting professor
- Barry Herr, CPA, former adjunct professor at the University of Nevada, Las Vegas and nominee for Controller in 2010
- Ron Knecht, Regent of the University of Nevada, Reno and former state assemblyman

==== Results ====
Republican primary results
Party	Candidate	Votes	%
Republican	Ron Knecht	56,497	52.57%
Republican	Barry Herr	20,820	19.37%
None of These Candidates		15,423	14.35%
Republican	Cort Arlint	14,736	13.71%
Total votes		107,476	100.0%

=== Independent American ===
- Tom Jones

=== General election ===
==== Results ====
2014 Nevada State Controller election
Party	Candidate	Votes	%	±%
Republican	Ron Knecht	282,674	52.53%	+9.95%
Democratic	Andrew Martin	202,573	37.64%	−9.85%
Independent American	Tom Jones	29,108	5.41%	+0.58%
None of These Candidates		23,811	4.42%	-0.68%
Total votes		538,166	100.0%	
Republican gain from Democratic				

== State Legislature ==
=== Nevada Senate ===
Eleven out of twenty-one seats in the Nevada Senate were up for election in 2014. Six of the seats were currently held by Republicans, and Democrats held five. Democrats held a one-seat majority in the state senate. Republicans flipped one seat and won an 11-10 majority

=== Nevada Assembly ===
All 42 seats in the Nevada Assembly were up for election in 2014. Democrats held 26 seats, Republicans held 15 seats and there was one vacancy.

District		Incumbent				Election 2014		
District	Primary Election Close of Registration	Representative	Party	First Elected	Last Eligible Election	Incumbent	Challengers	Result
District 1	D +20.32%	Marilyn Kirkpatrick	Democratic	2004	2014	Ran for re-election and won	Roger "OZ" Baum (Republican)	Democratic hold
District 2	R +5.02%	John Hambrick	Republican	2008	2018	Ran for re-election and won	Alice Jean "A.J." Maimbourg (Independent American Party of Nevada)'; Mark Slotta (Republican)	Republican hold
District 3	D +28.35%	Vacant	Vacant	2014	2024	Incumbent Peggy Pierce died of cancer on October 10, 2013, at the age of 59	Danny Alires (Democrat); Nelson Araujo Jr. (Democrat); Chris Barry (Democrat); Felipe Ignacio Rodriguez (Democrat); Matthew Tramp (Democrat); Nakia Woodson (Democrat); Jesus Marquez (Republican)	Democratic win (new seat)
District 4	D +1.14%	Michele Fiore	Republican	2012	2022	Ran for re-election and won	Jeff Hinton (Democrat); John-Nicholas W. White (Democrat); Melissa D. Laughter (Republican)	Republican hold
District 5	D +5.97%	Marilyn Dondero Loop	Democratic	2008	n/a	Ran for Nevada Senate District 8 and lost	Jerri Strasser (Democrat); Troy W. Archer (Republican); Barry Keller (Republican); Max Miller-Hooks (Republican); Erven T. Nelson (Republican); Stuart Blake Tener (Republican)	Republican win (new seat)
District 6	D +65.18%	Harvey Munford	Democratic	2004	2014	Ran for re-election and won	Arrick Foster (Democrat); Anthony D. Snowden (Democrat)	Democratic hold
District 7	D +39.55%	Dina Neal	Democratic	2010	2020	Ran for re-election and won	Stephen "Steph" Taylor (Democrat); Brent Leavitt (Republican)	Democratic hold
District 8	D +15.12%	Jason Frierson	Democratic	2010	2020	Ran for re-election and lost	John Moore (Republican)	Republican gain from Democratic
District 9	D +8.11%	Andrew Martin	Democratic	2012	2022	Ran for Nevada State Controller and lost	Kelly Mercer (Democrat); Joe Tinio (Democrat); Steve Yeager (Democrat); David M. Gardner (Republican)	Republican win (new seat)
District 10	D +24.22%	Joseph Hogan	Democratic	2004	Retired	Retired	J.T. Creedon (Democrat); Jonathan Friedrich (Democrat); Jesse "Jake" Holder (Democrat); Shelly M. Shelton (Republican)	Republican win (new seat)
District 11	D +49.90%	Olivia Diaz	Democratic	2010	2020	Ran for re-election unopposed	No filed candidate	Democratic hold
District 12	D +15.44%	James Ohrenschall	Democratic	2006	2016	Ran for re-election and won	Troy Warren (Independent American Party of Nevada)	Democratic hold
District 13	R +3.85%	Paul Anderson	Republican	2012	2022	Ran for re-election and won	Christine Lynn Kramer (Democrat)	Republican hold
District 14	D +37.31%	Maggie Carlton	Democratic	2010	2020	Ran for re-election and won	Jack Brooks (Democrat); Matthew Yarbrough (Republican)	Democratic hold
District 15	D +33.34%	Elliot Anderson	Democratic	2010	2020	Ran for re-election and won	Benjamin Donlon (Republican); Roberto S. Juarez (Libertarian)	Democratic hold
District 16	D +30.31%	Heidi Swank	Democratic	2012	2022	Ran for re-election unopposed	No filed candidate	Democratic hold
District 17	D +28.37%	Tyrone Thompson	Democratic	Appointed 2013	2024	Ran for re-election and won	Patricia "Pat" Little (Independent American Party of Nevada); Patrick Mendez (Republican)	Democratic hold
District 18	D +26.84%	Richard Carrillo	Democratic	2010	2020	Ran for re-election and won	Amy Beaulieu (Democrat)	Democratic hold
District 19	R +2.89%	Cresent Hardy	Republican	2010	n/a	Ran for Nevada's 4th Congressional District and won	James Zygadlo (Democrat); Donald Wayne Hendon (Libertarian); Laura Bledsoe (Republican); Chris Edwards (Republican); Frank Tavares (Republican)	Republican win (new seat)
District 20	D +17.55%	Ellen Spiegel	Democratic	2008	2020	Ran for re-election and won	Carol Linton (Republican)	Democratic hold
District 21	D +7.5%	Andy Eisen	Democratic	2012	2022	Ran for re-election and lost	Adam-John Sanacore (Libertarian); Derek Armstrong (Republican); Andrew W. Coates (Republican)	Republican gain from Democratic
District 22	R +6.33%	Lynn Stewart	Republican	2006	2016	Ran for re-election and won	Leroy T. Lalley (Independent American Party of Nevada); Richard Bunce (Republican)	Republican hold
District 23	R +13.2%	Melissa Woodbury	Republican	2008	2018	Ran for re-election unopposed	No filed candidate	Republican hold
District 24	D +21.67%	David Bobzien	Democratic	2006	2016	Ran for re-election unopposed	No filed candidate	Democratic hold
District 25	R +10.56%	Pat Hickey	Republican	2010	2020	Ran for re-election and won	Rick Fineberg (Republican); Niklas Putnam (independent)	Republican hold
District 26	R +15.78%	Randy Kirner	Republican	2010	2020	Ran for re-election and won	Rob Archie (Republican); Lisa Krasner (Republican)	Republican hold
District 27	D +7.77%	Teresa Benitez-Thompson	Democratic	2010	2020	Ran for re-election and won	Rodney Bloom (Republican); Rex Crouch (Republican)	Democratic hold
District 28	D +47.37%	Lucy Flores	Democratic	2010	n/a	Ran for Nevada Lieutenant Governor and lost	Edgar Flores (Democrat)	Democratic win (new seat)
District 29	D +2.7%	Lesley Cohen	Democratic	Appointed 2012	2022	Appointed ran for election and lost	Amy L. Groves (Republican); Stephen Silberkraus (Republican)	Republican gain from Democratic
District 30	D +12.89%	Michael Sprinkle	Democratic	2012	2022	Ran for re-election and won	Adam Khan (Republican); Lauren Scott (Republican)	Democratic hold
District 31	R +4.66%	Skip Daly	Democratic	2010	2020	Ran for re-election and lost	Jill Dickman (Republican); Ron Schmitt (Republican)	Republican gain from Democratic
District 32	R +20.7%	Ira Hansen	Republican	2010	2020	Ran for re-election and won	John Sharp Sampaga (Democratic); Louis "Wedge" Gabriel (Libertarian)	Republican hold
District 33	R +32.99%	John Ellison	Republican	2010	2020	Ran for re-election unopposed	No filed candidate	Republican hold
District 34	D +13.14%	William Horne	Democratic	2002	2012	Term Limited	Gary Fisher (Democrat); Fayyaz Raja (Democrat); Sanje Sedera (Democrat); Meghan Smith (Democrat); Victoria Seaman (Republican)	Republican win (new seat)
District 35	D +5.56%	James Healey	Democratic	2012	2022	Ran for re-election and lost	Charles J. Clark Jr. (Democrat); Michael "Mike" Bajorek (Republican); Brent A. Jones (Republican)	Republican gain from Democratic
District 36	R +13.23%	James Oscarson	Republican	2012	2022	Ran for re-election unopposed	No filed candidate	Republican hold
District 37	R +0.43%	Wesley Duncan	Republican	2012	2022	Ran for re-election and won	Gerald Mackin (Democratic); Lou Pombo (Libertarian)	Republican hold
District 38	R +25.75%	Tom Grady	Republican	2002	2012	Term Limited	Timothy Fasano (Independent American Party of Nevada); John O'Connor (Libertarian); Norm Frey (Republican); Robin L. Titus (Republican)	Republican win (new seat)
District 39	R +25.48%	Jim Wheeler	Republican	2012	2022	Ran for re-election and won	Al Giodano (Independent American Party of Nevada); Robin Reedy (Republican)	Republican hold
District 40	R +13.11%	Pete Livermore	Republican	2010	n/a	Retired	Dave Cook (Democratic); John Wagner (Independent American Party of Nevada); John "Jed" Block (Republican); P. K. O'Neill (Republican)	Republican win (new seat)
District 41	D +6.76%	Paul Aizley	Democratic	2008	2018	Ran for re-election and lost	Victoria A. Dooling (Republican)	Republican gain from Democratic
District 42	D +24.04%	Irene Bustamante Adams	Democratic	2010	2020	Ran for re-election and won	Howard Scheff (Independent American Party of Nevada)	Democratic hold

== State Judicial Branch ==
=== Supreme Court Seat B ===
Incumbent justice Kristina Pickering filed to run for re-election without any opposition.

=== Supreme Court Seat D ===
Incumbent justice Mark Gibbons filed to run for re-election without any opposition.

== Ballot Initiatives ==
=== Intermediate Appellate Court ===
Senate Joint Resolution No. 14 of the 76th Session creates an intermediate appellate court between the District Court level and the Nevada Supreme Court. After passing through the 76th Session in 2011 with a vote of 48 in favor, 13 against and two excused, and the 77th Session in 2013 with a vote of 61 in favor, none against and two excused, Senate Joint Resolution No. 14 will be placed on the 2014 general election ballot for popular vote to amend the Constitution of Nevada.

=== The Education Initiative ===
The Education Initiative was on the 2014 ballot in the state of Nevada as an indirect initiated state statute. The measure seeks to implement a 2 percent margins tax on businesses in the state and requires that the proceeds of the tax be used to fund the operation of public schools in Nevada for kindergarten through grade 12. Initiative Petition No. 1 was forwarded to the Nevada Legislature from the Secretary of State's office after qualifying for the ballot for legislative action. The Legislature did not act on IP No. 1 within the framework pursuant to Article 19, section 2 of the Nevada Constitution and automatically went on the ballot in 2014.

=== Mining Tax ===
Senate Joint Resolution No. 15 of the 76th Session proposes to amend the Nevada Constitution to remove the separate tax rate and manner of assessing and distributing the tax on mines and the proceeds of mines. After passing through the 76th Session in 2011 with a vote of 40 in favor and 23 against, and the 77th Session in 2013 with a vote of 43 in favor, 19 against and one excused, Senate Joint Resolution No. 15 will be placed on the 2014 general election ballot for popular vote to amend the Constitution of Nevada.

=== Margin Tax for Public Schools ===
Results by county No: 80–90%; 70–80%
