= Dan Schwartz =

American politician (born 1950)

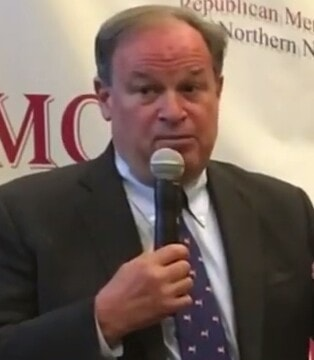

22nd Treasurer of Nevada
- In office January 5, 2015 – January 7, 2019
- Governor: Brian Sandoval
- Preceded by: Kate Marshall
- Succeeded by: Zach Conine

Personal details
- Born: Daniel Mark Schwartz; July 28, 1950 (age 75) Chicago, Illinois, U.S.
- Party: Republican
- Education: Princeton University (AB); Columbia University (MBA); Boston University (JD)
- Website: danschwartzfornevada.com

Military service
- Allegiance: United States
- Branch/service: United States Army
- Years of service: 1972–1974
- Rank: Specialist 4th Class

Daniel Mark Schwartz (born July 28, 1950) is an American businessman and attorney who served as Nevada State Treasurer from January 2015 to January 2019. A Republican, Schwartz defeated his Democratic opponent, former Nevada State Controller Kim Wallin, in the 2014 Nevada State Treasurer election.

He unsuccessfully ran to serve as Governor of Nevada in 2018, to represent Nevada's 3rd congressional district in 2020, and to serve as Lieutenant Governor of Nevada in 2022. In each election, he was defeated in the Republican primary.

== Early life ==
Schwartz was born on July 28, 1950, in Chicago, Illinois, the son of Francine (née Abrahams) and Jim Schwartz. His grandfather was a rabbi and his father was an early Holiday Inn owner. He has one brother, Stephen, and one sister, Marian. Schwartz attended Oak Park and River High School where he graduated in the "top 20" of his 800-member class and was president of his senior class. Schwartz attended Princeton University and graduated with an A.B. in politics in 1972 after completing a senior thesis titled "Theory of the American State." In his junior year, Schwartz studied at the Instituts d'études politiques in Paris, France, where he was awarded a Certificat d'Etudes Politiques.

After graduation, Schwartz enlisted in the United States Army in September 1972, where he rose to the rank of Specialist 4th Class and served on a Pershing Missile base in West Germany from January 1973 to September 1974. He was honorably discharged. He received his M.B.A. from Columbia University Graduate School of Business (1978); and his J.D. from Boston University (1981).

== Business career ==
=== Finance ===
Schwartz began his financial career in private placements at First City National Bank of Houston in 1978. The bank, which became First City Bancorporation of Texas, Inc. was the largest bank in Texas during the 1970s. In 1982, he briefly worked in corporate finance at Keefe, Bruyette & Woods in New York City before going on to work for Daiwa Capital Markets, where he started their mergers and acquisitions department and was a member of the team that underwrote the first Euroyen bond for an overseas company – Sears. He then joined Becker Paribas Inc., where he was part of the group which started Paribas Merchant Banking Group in 1985.

In September 1986, Schwartz founded his own boutique financial advisory firm, Ulmer Brothers, Inc., specializing in cross-border mergers and acquisitions. While at Ulmer Brothers, Schwartz advised on the first IPO of a Japanese subsidiary of a U.S. company in 1989. The firm also published several newsletters and journals, which captured Schwartz's interest. He soon shifted his career path to financial publishing.

=== Financial publishing ===
In 1993, Schwartz purchased the Asian Venture Capital Journal (AVCJ) in Hong Kong. AVCJ became a leading source of information on Asian private equity and venture capital, and its AVCJ Forum became the top private equity and venture capital event in Asia. AVCJ also became the first company to distribute the digital edition of a print publication in 1998. The company was purchased by British publishing company Incisive Media in 2006. AVCJ was subsequently sold to BC Partners-owned Mergermarket Group in 2015. Schwartz relinquished his title of chairman Emeritus of AVCJ in 2008.

In 1998, Schwartz founded Qiosk.com, an online news aggregator and distributor, which became one of the early pioneers of delivering print publications via the internet. He is still a majority shareholder in the company today.

== Political career ==
=== 2012 U.S. House of Representatives election ===
Schwartz entered a competitive race for United States House of Representatives in Nevada's newly created 4th congressional district. He finished behind current Nevada Secretary of State Barbara Cegavske and the eventual nominee Danny Tarkanian.

=== Path to citizenship for undocumented immigrants ===
Schwartz told the Las Vegas Review-Journal in a 2013 interview that he supported a "path to citizenship" for undocumented immigrants who had established themselves in the United States, but more importantly, called out the need for an immigration bill.

=== GOP State Finance chairman ===
From 2012 to 2014, Schwartz served as Finance Chair for the Nevada Republican Party.

=== 2014 Nevada State Treasurer election ===
On September 18, 2013, Schwartz announced his candidacy for Nevada State Treasurer at a meeting of the Clark County Republican Party Central Committee in Las Vegas, Nevada. His campaign was largely focused on improving returns on the State's funds while protecting and expanding college scholarship and savings programs.

=== 2015 budget debate ===
During the 78th session of the Nevada Legislature, Schwartz was the first to publicly question Nevada Governor Brian Sandoval's proposed $7.3 billion budget, which contained $1.1 billion in tax increases. Schwartz outlined his concerns in a three-page memo to the Senate Finance Committee, which among other issues, challenged the State's ability to implement the tax hikes at one time.

=== Education Savings Accounts ===
Nevada's ESA bill was passed in the 2015 legislature, to be administered by the Nevada Treasurer's office, and is called the first universal ESA program in the nation. The program seeks to improve Nevada's ranking among the 50 states.

After Schwartz's office adopted and published regulations, two court cases were filed against the ESA program. The first lawsuit, by the ACLU (Duncan v. Nevada), was filed in Las Vegas and argued that the program was not constitutional. They claimed the program violated Nevada's Blaine Amendment, which states: "no public funds of any kind or character whatever, State, county or Municipal, shall be used for a sectarian purpose." District Court Judge Eric Johnson dismissed the case in May 2016, ruling the program to be "neutral with respect to religion."

The second lawsuit, by Educate Nevada Now and promoted by The Rogers Foundation (Lopez v. Schwartz), was filed in Carson City, Nevada. This case challenged a different constitutional provision. District Court Judge James Wilson placed a temporary injunction on the program in January 2016 stating that public school dollars would go toward private schools, preventing full implementation.

The losing side in each case appealed the decision, and the Nevada Supreme Court heard both cases on the same day in July 2016. The Court upheld the lower decision in Duncan v. Nevada, ruling that the program was constitutional, and also upheld the lower decision in Lopez v. Schwartz, finding that the funding mechanism was defective.

Treasurer Schwartz urged Governor Sandoval to take up the ESA funding issue in an October 2016 Special Session of the Nevada Legislature designed to approve funding for an NFL stadium, so that the program could continue for the 10,000 families who had already signed up for the program.

=== Electric cars ===
Schwartz repeatedly called into question the viability of a $1 billion Faraday Future electric vehicle plant in North Las Vegas, Nevada, after LeEco, the internet company belonging to the billionaire Chinese entrepreneur behind Faraday Future, Jia Yueting, suspended trading in his public company, Leshi, in December 2015. It was during that same month that the Nevada Legislature approved $335 million in incentives to lure Faraday to the state.

In mid-November 2016, Faraday Future announced that it had suspended construction on the plant. In December 2016, Leshi again suspended trading in its shares due to a cash crunch and rumored margin calls on borrowings by Jia Yueting. In September 2018, Faraday announced that the company was formally withdrawing from the project.

=== Campaign for governor ===
On September 5, 2017, Schwartz announced that he intended to seek the Republican nomination for governor of Nevada He later endorsed state attorney general Adam Laxalt who then lost to Steve Sisolak.

=== Other ===
Schwartz also pursued other objectives at the treasurer's office. He has reduced the number of process days from 120 to same-day processing for unclaimed property claims, combined and strengthened the college savings program, refunded the State's debt to produce $80 million in annual savings, has authored bills to curb the abuses of payday loans, and suggested a major overhaul of the State's tax system.

== Electoral history ==
Nevada State Treasurer election, 2014
Party	Candidate	Votes	%	±%
Republican	Dan Schwartz	277,613	51.46	+7.66
Democratic	Kim Wallin	223,793	41.49	−6.81
Independent American	Kress Cave	19,355	3.59	−0.41
None of These Candidates	None of These Candidates	18,686	3.46	−0.34
Total votes		539,447	100	
Republican gain from Democratic		Swing	+14.46	

== Criticism ==
In the summer of 2015, Schwartz hired Nevada Republican Party Chair Michael McDonald to serve as a senior deputy treasurer despite McDonald's embroilment in a civil lawsuit. A restructuring of department staff resulted in McDonald's resignation in October 2015. The lawsuit was settled privately.

Schwartz also challenged Nevada Lieutenant Governor Mark Hutchison when Hutchison filed his own lawsuit in defense of Nevada's Education Savings Account program. Schwartz joined the Nevada Attorney General's office in arguing that the private suit could jeopardize the legal proceedings already underway, which included lawsuits filed by the American Civil Liberties Union and a group of parents. Nevada's Attorney General, Adam Laxalt, had already hired former U.S. Solicitor General Paul Clement to defend the state against those lawsuits. Hutchison dropped the suit, but not before Schwartz suggested he should resign if he did not.

== Family and personal life ==
Schwartz and his wife Yanan were married on September 9, 2011. Resident in Beijing, Yanan headed the Sino-Italian Cooperation Program for Environmental Protection in Beijing. She is fluent in Mandarin and Italian. She became a U.S. citizen in March 2016. He has two daughters, Allison and Dana, from his first marriage.

== Published works ==
Schwartz, Dan (2010). The Future of Finance: How Private Equity and Venture Capital Will Shape the Global Economy. New York: John Wiley. ISBN 978-0470825112.

Schwartz, Dan (2012). Principles of the American Republic. Burlingame: Sturdy Oak Publishing. ISBN 978-0615388434.

In addition to publishing the Asian Venture Capital Journal (1993–2008), Schwartz also published Policy Today (2004–2008).

Political offices
Preceded by Kate Marshall	Treasurer of Nevada; 2015–2019	Succeeded by Zach Conine
