= 2014 Nevada gubernatorial election =

- November 4, 2014

Nominee	Brian Sandoval	Bob Goodman
Party	Republican	Democratic
Popular vote	386,340	130,722
Percentage	70.58%	23.88%
- Sandoval: 50–60% 60–70% 70–80% 80–90%
Governor before election
Brian Sandoval
Republican
Elected Governor
Brian Sandoval
Republican

The 2014 Nevada gubernatorial election was held on Tuesday, November 4, 2014, to elect the Governor of Nevada. Incumbent Republican governor Brian Sandoval won re-election to a second term in office, defeating Democratic nominee Bob Goodman in a landslide. Sandoval won a higher percentage of the vote than any other incumbent governor in 2014. This was one of nine Republican-held governorships up for election in a state that Barack Obama won in the 2012 presidential election.

Sandoval's coattails allowed Republicans to win both chambers of the legislature for the first time since 1931, thereby giving Republicans a trifecta in the state for the first time since then.

As of 2026, this is the most recent time that the Republican candidate carried Clark County in a statewide race, the last time that the winner of the gubernatorial election carried all counties in Nevada, and the last time the winner received more than 55% of the vote.

== Republican primary ==
=== Candidates ===
==== Declared ====
- Edward Hamilton, businessman and candidate for the U.S. Senate in 2010
- Gary Marinch
- Brian Sandoval, incumbent governor
- William Tarbell
- Thomas Tighe

==== Declined ====
- Jim Gibbons, former governor
- Joe Heck, U.S. Representative (ran for re-election and won)
- Mike Montandon, former mayor of North Las Vegas and candidate for governor in 2010

=== Results ===
2014 Nevada gubernatorial Republican primary results by county: Sandoval: >90%; 80–90%; 70–80%

Republican primary results
Party	Candidate	Votes	%
Republican	Brian Sandoval (incumbent)	105,857	89.88%
Republican	Edward Hamilton	3,758	3.19%
None of These Candidates		3,509	2.98%
Republican	William Tarbell	1,966	1.67%
Republican	Thomas Tighe	1,495	1.27%
Republican	Gary Marinch	1,195	1.01%
Total votes		117,780	100.0%

== Democratic primary ==
For the first time in a gubernatorial election since it was added in 1975, the None of These Candidates option received a plurality of the votes. This has been ascribed to the eight Democratic candidates' lack of name recognition, money and political experience. High-profile Democrats were put off by Sandoval's popularity and large war chest, leading to no "serious challenger" emerging. According to state law, even if the "None of These Candidates" option receives the most votes in an election, the actual candidate who receives the most votes still wins the election. Thus, Bob Goodman was certified as the Democratic nominee.

=== Candidates ===
==== Declared ====
- Charles Chang
- Frederick Conquest, anthropology professor and candidate for governor in 2010
- Stephen Frye, psychiatrist and candidate for NV-03 in 2012
- Bob Goodman, former Economic Development Commissioner, former Wyoming economic development director and candidate for lieutenant governor in 2006 and 2010
- Chris Hyepock, casino manager
- Allen Rheinhart, painter, sculptor and writer
- John Rutledge, philanthropist and attorney
- Abdul Shabazz, denture repair business owner and candidate for Mayor of Las Vegas in 2011

==== Withdrew ====
- Fernando Lopes

==== Declined ====
- Richard Bryan, former U.S. Senator and former governor
- Barbara Buckley, former Speaker of the Nevada Assembly
- Catherine Cortez Masto, Nevada Attorney General
- Steven Horsford, U.S. Representative (ran for re-election and lost)
- Jan Laverty Jones, former mayor of Las Vegas, candidate for governor in 1994 and nominee for governor 1998
- Ruben Kihuen, state senator (ran for re-election and won)
- Susie Lee, education activist
- Kate Marshall, Nevada State Treasurer (ran for Secretary of State and lost)
- Ross Miller, Secretary of State of Nevada (ran for Nevada Attorney General and lost)
- Joe Neal, former state senator and nominee for governor in 2002
- Rory Reid, former Clark County Commissioner and nominee for governor in 2010
- Tick Segerblom, state senator
- Steve Sisolak, Clark County Commissioner
- Debbie Smith, state senator (ran for re-election and won)
- Dina Titus, U.S. Representative and nominee for governor in 2006 (ran for re-election and won)

=== Results ===
2014 Nevada gubernatorial Democratic primary results by county: None of These Candidates: 40–50%; 30–40%; <30%; Goodman: <30%

Democratic primary results
Party	Candidate	Votes	%
None of These Candidates		21,725	29.96%
Democratic	Bob Goodman	17,961	24.77%
Democratic	Stephen Frye	8,231	11.35%
Democratic	John Rutledge	6,039	8.33%
Democratic	Charles Chang	5,619	7.75%
Democratic	Chris Hyepock	4,743	6.54%
Democratic	Allen Rheinhart	3,605	4.97%
Democratic	Abdul Shabazz	2,731	3.77%
Democratic	Frederick Conquest	1,867	2.57%
Total votes		72,521	100.0%

== Independent American Party of Nevada primary ==
=== Candidates ===
==== Declared ====
- David Lory VanDerBeek, family therapist and nominee for the Nevada Assembly in 2010 and the U.S. Senate in 2012

== Green primary ==
=== Candidates ===
==== Withdrew ====
- David Gibson

== Independents ==
=== Candidates ===
==== Withdrew ====
- Frederick Conquest, anthropology professor and Democratic candidate for governor in 2010

== General election ==
=== Candidates ===
- Brian Sandoval (Republican), incumbent governor of Nevada
- Bob Goodman (Democratic), former economic development commissioner, former Wyoming director of economic development and candidate for lieutenant governor in 2006 and 2010
- David Lory VanDerBeek (Independent American Party of Nevada), family therapist and nominee for the Nevada Assembly in 2010 and the U.S. Senate in 2012

=== Predictions ===
Source	Ranking	As of
The Cook Political Report	Solid R	November 3, 2014
Sabato's Crystal Ball	Safe R	November 3, 2014
Rothenberg Political Report	Safe R	November 3, 2014
Real Clear Politics	Safe R	November 3, 2014

=== Polling ===
Poll source	Date(s) administered	Sample size	Margin of error	Brian Sandoval (R)	Bob Goodman (D)	Other	Undecided
CBS News/NYT/YouGov	October 16–23, 2014	1,314	± 4%	53%	28%	6%	13%
CBS News/NYT/YouGov	September 20–October 1, 2014	1,502	± 3%	56%	25%	9%	10%
CBS News/NYT/YouGov	August 18–September 2, 2014	2,018	± 3%	51%	29%	8%	12%
Harper Polling	July 26–29, 2014	602	± 3.99%	56%	34%	—	10%
CBS News/NYT/YouGov	July 5–24, 2014	2,189	± ?	57%	33%	2%	8%
Rasmussen Reports	June 16–18, 2014	750	± 4%	55%	28%	6%	11%

Hypothetical polling

Poll source	Date(s) administered	Sample size	Margin of error	Brian Sandoval (R)	Catherine Cortez Masto (D)	Undecided
Public Policy Polling	June 7–10, 2012	500	± 4.4%	51%	33%	16%

Poll source	Date(s) administered	Sample size	Margin of error	Brian Sandoval (R)	Chris Hyepock (D)	David Lory VanDerBeek (IAP)	Undecided
Precision Research	March 3–5, 2014	216	± 6.67%	58%	16%	12%	14%

Poll source	Date(s) administered	Sample size	Margin of error	Brian Sandoval (R)	Ross Miller (D)	Undecided
Public Policy Polling	June 7–10, 2012	500	± 4.4%	50%	28%	22%

Poll source	Date(s) administered	Sample size	Margin of error	Brian Sandoval (R)	Generic Democrat	Undecided
Public Policy Polling	November 3–4, 2012	750	± 3.6%	55%	32%	12%
Public Policy Polling	October 8–10, 2012	594	± 4.0%	53%	34%	13%
Public Policy Polling	August 23–26, 2012	831	± 3.4%	53%	35%	12%

=== Results ===
2014 Nevada gubernatorial election
Party	Candidate	Votes	%	±%
Republican	Brian Sandoval (incumbent)	386,340	70.58%	+17.22%
Democratic	Bob Goodman	130,722	23.88%	−17.73%
None of These Candidates		15,751	2.88%	+1.17%
Independent American	David Lory VanDerBeek	14,536	2.66%	+1.95%
Majority		255,618	46.70%	
Total votes		547,349	100.0%	
Republican hold		Swing	+34.95%	

==== By county ====
County	Brian Sandoval Republican		Bob Goodman Democratic		None of These Candidates		David Lory VanDerBeek Independent American		Margin		Total votes cast
County	#	%	#	%	#	%	#	%	#	%	Total votes cast
Carson City	12,108	77.38%	2,410	15.40%	608	3.89%	521	3.33%	9,698	61.98%	15,647
Churchill	6,356	85.26%	666	8.93%	156	2.09%	277	3.72%	5,690	76.32%	7,455
Clark	223,433	66.17%	97,097	28.75%	9,675	2.87%	7,482	2.22%	126,336	37.41%	337,687
Douglas	14,910	82.71%	2,174	12.06%	413	2.29%	529	2.93%	12,736	70.65%	18,026
Elko	8,038	78.80%	1,119	10.97%	297	2.91%	746	7.31%	6,919	67.83%	10,200
Esmeralda	273	76.90%	42	11.83%	15	4.23%	25	7.04%	231	65.07%	355
Eureka	533	76.14%	53	7.57%	45	6.43%	69	9.86%	480	68.57%	700
Humboldt	3,633	83.54%	459	10.55%	108	2.48%	149	3.43%	3,174	72.98%	4,349
Lander	1,475	83.66%	163	9.25%	42	2.38%	83	4.71%	1,312	74.42%	1,763
Lincoln	1,323	82.22%	146	9.07%	56	3.48%	84	5.22%	1,177	73.15%	1,609
Lyon	11,659	82.22%	1,643	11.59%	340	2.40%	539	3.80%	10,016	70.63%	14,181
Mineral	1,102	78.38%	210	14.94%	48	3.41%	46	3.27%	892	63.44%	1,406
Nye	9,095	74.75%	2,005	16.48%	316	2.60%	751	6.17%	7,090	58.27%	12,167
Pershing	1,228	78.92%	174	11.18%	53	3.41%	101	6.49%	1,054	67.74%	1,556
Storey	1,462	77.11%	265	13.98%	71	3.74%	98	5.17%	1,197	63.13%	1,896
Washoe	87,739	75.92%	21,598	18.69%	3,373	2.92%	2,855	2.47%	66,141	57.23%	115,565
White Pine	1,973	70.79%	498	17.87%	135	4.84%	181	6.49%	1,475	52.92%	2,787
Totals	386,340	70.58%	130,722	23.88%	15,751	2.88%	14,536	2.66%	255,618	46.70%	547,349

==== By congressional district ====
Sandoval won all four congressional districts, including one that elected a Democrat.

District	Sandoval	Goodman	Representative
1st	59%	35%	Dina Titus
2nd	78%	16%	Mark Amodei
3rd	71%	24%	Joe Heck
4th	66%	28%	Steven Horsford
4th	66%	28%	Cresent Hardy
