= 2018 Nevada Secretary of State election =

- November 6, 2018
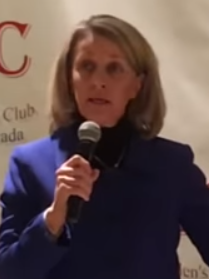

Nominee	Barbara Cegavske	Nelson Araujo
Party	Republican	Democratic
Popular vote	467,880	461,551
Percentage	48.91%	48.25%
- Cegavske: 40–50% 50–60% 60–70% 70–80% 80–90% Araujo: 40–50% 50–60% 60–70%
Secretary of State before election
Barbara Cegavske
Republican
Elected Secretary of State
Barbara Cegavske
Republican

The 2018 Nevada Secretary of State election was held on November 6, 2018, to elect the Secretary of State of Nevada, concurrently with elections to the United States Senate, U.S. House of Representatives, governor, and other state and local elections. Primary elections were held on June 12, 2018.

Incumbent Republican secretary Barbara Cegavske ran for re-election to a second term in office against Democratic assemblyman Nelson Araujo. Despite a blue wave across the state and Democrats winning every other major statewide office, Cegavske narrowly won re-election to a second term in office.

== Republican primary ==
=== Candidates ===
==== Nominee ====
- Barbara Cegavske, incumbent secretary of state (2015–present)

==== Eliminated in primary ====
- Ernest Aldridge

=== Results ===
Republican primary results
Party	Candidate	Votes	%
Republican	Barbara Cegavske (incumbent)	85,355	62.54
Republican	Ernest Aldridge	36,508	26.75
None of These Candidates		14,613	10.71
Total votes		136,476	100.00

== Democratic primary ==
=== Candidates ===
==== Nominee ====
- Nelson Araujo, state assemblyman from the 3rd district (2014–present)

==== Declined ====
- Oscar Delgado, Reno city councilman
- Pat Spearman, state senator from the 1st district (2013–present) (endorsed Araujo)

== General election ==
=== Predictions ===
Source	Ranking	As of
Governing	Tossup	October 11, 2018

=== Endorsements ===
Barbara Cegavske (R)

Newspapers and other media

- Las Vegas Review-Journal

Organizations

- Maggie's List
Nelson Araujo (D)

Executive branch officials

- Joe Biden, 47th Vice President of the United States (2009–2017) and former United States Senator from Delaware (1973–2009)
- Barack Obama, 44th President of the United States (2009–2017) and former United States Senator from Illinois (2005–2008)

U.S. senators

- Catherine Cortez Masto, incumbent United States Senator from Nevada (2017–present) and former Nevada Attorney General (2007–2015)
- Harry Reid, former Senate Majority Leader (2007–2015), former United States Senator from Nevada (1987–2017), and U.S. representative from Nevada's 1st congressional district (1983–1987)

Statewide officials

- Jason Kander, former Missouri Secretary of State (2013–2017)

State senators

- Pat Spearman, state senator from the 1st district (2013–present)

State representatives

- Jason Frierson, incumbent Speaker of the Nevada Assembly (2017–present), state assemblyman from the 8th district (2013–present) and 26th district (2011–2013)

Newspapers and other media

- Las Vegas Sun

Labor unions

- Culinary Workers Union
- United Food and Commercial Workers

Organizations

- Human Rights Campaign
- LGBTQ Victory Fund

=== Results ===
2018 Nevada Secretary of State election
Party	Candidate	Votes	%	±%
Republican	Barbara Cegavske (incumbent)	467,880	48.91	–1.49
Democratic	Nelson Araujo	461,551	48.25	+2.10
None of These Candidates		27,200	2.84	–0.61
Majority		6,329	0.66	–3.59
Total votes		956,631	100.00	
Republican hold		Swing	–1.80	

==== By county ====
2018 Nevada Secretary of State election (by county)
County	Barbara Cegavske Republican		Nelson Araujo Democratic		N/A None of These Candidates		Margin		Total votes cast
County	#	%	#	%	#	%	#	%	Total votes cast
Carson City	13,124	57.95%	8,886	39.24%	636	2.81%	4,238	18.71%	22,646
Churchill	7,193	75.17%	2,117	22.12%	259	2.71%	5,076	53.05%	9,569
Clark	285,613	44.72%	334,808	52.42%	18,278	2.86%	-49,195	-7.70%	638,699
Douglas	17,167	66.90%	7,916	30.85%	576	2.25%	9,251	36.05%	25,659
Elko	11,768	77.90%	2,875	19.03%	463	3.07%	8,893	58.87%	15,106
Esmeralda	291	78.86%	57	15.45%	21	5.69%	234	63.41%	369
Eureka	649	85.85%	74	9.79%	33	4.36%	575	76.06%	756
Humboldt	4,102	75.81%	1,126	20.81%	183	3.38%	2,976	55.00%	5,411
Lander	1,585	75.84%	393	18.80%	112	5.36%	1,192	57.04%	2,090
Lincoln	1,610	83.08%	239	12.33%	89	4.59%	1,371	70.75%	1,938
Lyon	14,513	69.88%	5,648	27.20%	606	2.92%	8,865	42.68%	20,767
Mineral	1,067	59.48%	617	34.39%	110	6.13%	450	25.09%	1,794
Nye	12,212	70.23%	4,529	26.05%	647	3.72%	7,683	44.18%	17,388
Pershing	1,262	71.91%	432	24.62%	61	3.47%	830	47.29%	1,755
Storey	1,561	66.31%	727	30.88%	66	2.81%	834	35.43%	2,354
Washoe	91,787	49.08%	90,350	48.31%	4,872	2.61%	1,437	0.77%	187,009
White Pine	2,376	73.77%	657	20.40%	188	5.83%	1,719	53.37%	3,221

Counties that flipped from Democratic to Republican

- Mineral (largest municipality: Hawthorne)
- Washoe (largest municipality: Reno)

Counties that flipped from Republican to Democratic

- Clark (largest municipality: Las Vegas)

==== By congressional district ====
Cegavske won two of four congressional districts, one of which elected a Democrat.

District	Cegavske	Araujo	Representative
1st	35%	61%	Dina Titus
2nd	56%	41%	Mark Amodei
3rd	50%	47%	Jacky Rosen (115th Congress)
3rd	50%	47%	Susie Lee (116th Congress)
4th	47.6%	49.4%	Ruben Kihuen (115th Congress)
4th	47.6%	49.4%	Steven Horsford (116th Congress)
