= 2010 Nevada elections =

- November 2, 2010

Elections were held in Nevada on November 2, 2010. On that date, the state held elections for Governor, Lieutenant Governor, Attorney General, Secretary of State, Treasurer, Controller, U.S. Senate, U.S. House of Representatives, Nevada Senate, Nevada Assembly, and various others. In addition, several measures were on the ballot. Primary elections took place on June 8, 2010.

== Federal ==
=== United States Senate ===
Harry Reid, Nevada's Democratic incumbent senator, won re-election.

=== United States House ===
All three of Nevada's seats in the United States House of Representatives were up for re-election in 2010. Incumbents Democrat Shelley Berkley in District 1 and Republican Dean Heller in District 2 won re-election. Democrat Dina Titus of District 3 was defeated by Republican Joe Heck.

== State ==
=== Governor ===
Republican governor Jim Gibbons lost his bid for re-election in the Republican primary election on June 8, 2010, to Brian Sandoval. Sandoval won the general election against Rory Reid.

=== Lieutenant governor ===
2010 Nevada lieutenant gubernatorial election
- November 2, 2010
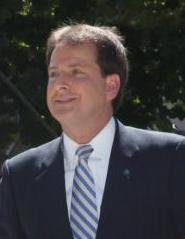

Nominee	Brian Krolicki	Jessica Sferrazza
Party	Republican	Democratic
Popular vote	360,590	294,564
Percentage	51.3%	41.9%
- County results Krolicki: 40-50% 50-60% 60-70% 70-80%
Lieutenant Governor before election
Brian Krolicki
Republican
Elected Lieutenant Governor
Brian Krolicki
Republican

Incumbent Republican Lieutenant Governor Brian Krolicki won re-election.

Nevada lieutenant gubernatorial election, 2010
Party	Candidate	Votes	%
Republican	Brian Krolicki (incumbent)	360,590	51.3
Democratic	Jessica Sferrazza	294,564	41.9
Independent American	Ryan Fitzgibbons	26,306	3.7
n/a	None of These Candidates	22,035	3.1
Total votes		703,495	100.0
Republican hold			

=== Secretary of State ===
2010 Nevada Secretary of State election
- November 2, 2010
Nominee	Ross Miller	Rob Lauer	John Wagner
Party	Democratic	Republican	Independent American
Popular vote	374,086	262,222	42,178
Percentage	53.2%	37.3%	6.0%
- Miller: 40–50% 50–60% 60–70% Lauer: 40–50% 50–60%
Secretary of State before election
Ross Miller
Democratic
Elected Secretary of State
Ross Miller
Democratic

Incumbent Democratic Secretary of State Ross Miller won re-election.

Nevada Secretary of State election, 2010
Party	Candidate	Votes	%
Democratic	Ross Miller (incumbent)	374,086	53.2
Republican	Rob Lauer	262,222	37.3
Independent American	John Wagner	42,178	6.0
n/a	None of These Candidates	25,027	3.6
Total votes		703,513	100.0
Democratic hold			

=== Attorney general ===
Incumbent Democratic Attorney General Catherine Cortez Masto won re-election.

Nevada Attorney General, 2010
Party	Candidate	Votes	%
Democratic	Catherine Cortez Masto (incumbent)	372,011	52.82
Republican	Travis Barrick	251,269	35.67
Independent American	Joel F. Hansen	54,980	7.81
n/a	None of These Candidates	26,072	3.70
Total votes		704,332	100.0
Democratic hold			

=== Treasurer ===
2010 Nevada State Treasurer election
- November 2, 2010
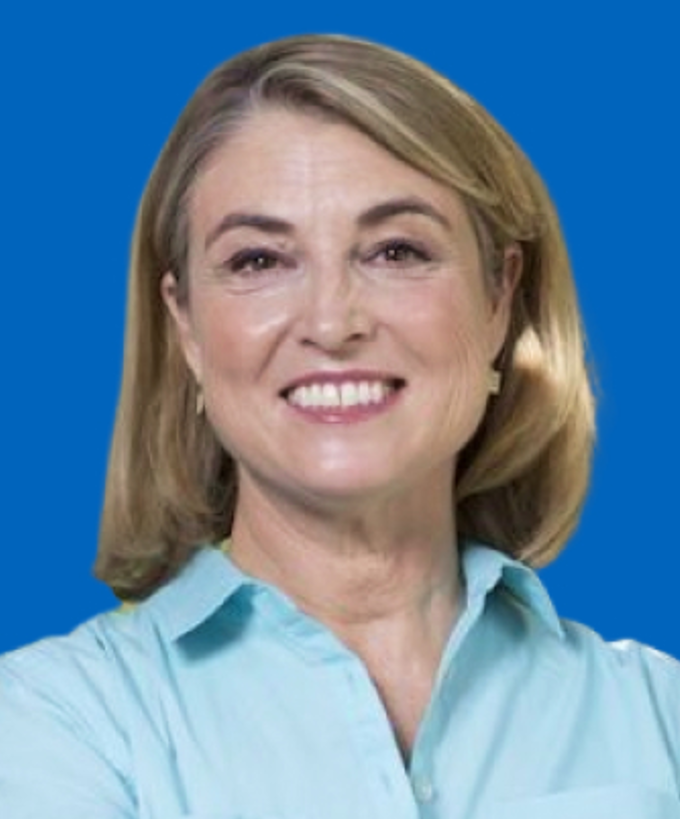

Nominee	Kate Marshall	Steven Martin
Party	Democratic	Republican
Popular vote	338,588	307,115
Percentage	48.3%	43.8%
- Marshall: 40–50% 50–60% 60–70% Martin: 40–50% 50–60% 60–70%
State Treasurer before election
Kate Marshall
Democratic
Elected State Treasurer
Kate Marshall
Democratic

Incumbent Democratic Treasurer Kate Marshall won re-election.

Nevada State Treasurer election, 2010
Party	Candidate	Votes	%
Democratic	Kate Marshall (incumbent)	338,588	48.3
Republican	Steven E. Martin	307,115	43.8
Independent American	Mike Hawkins	28,376	4.1
n/a	None of These Candidates	26,837	3.8
Total votes		700,916	100.0
Democratic hold			

=== Controller ===
2010 Nevada State Controller election
- November 2, 2010
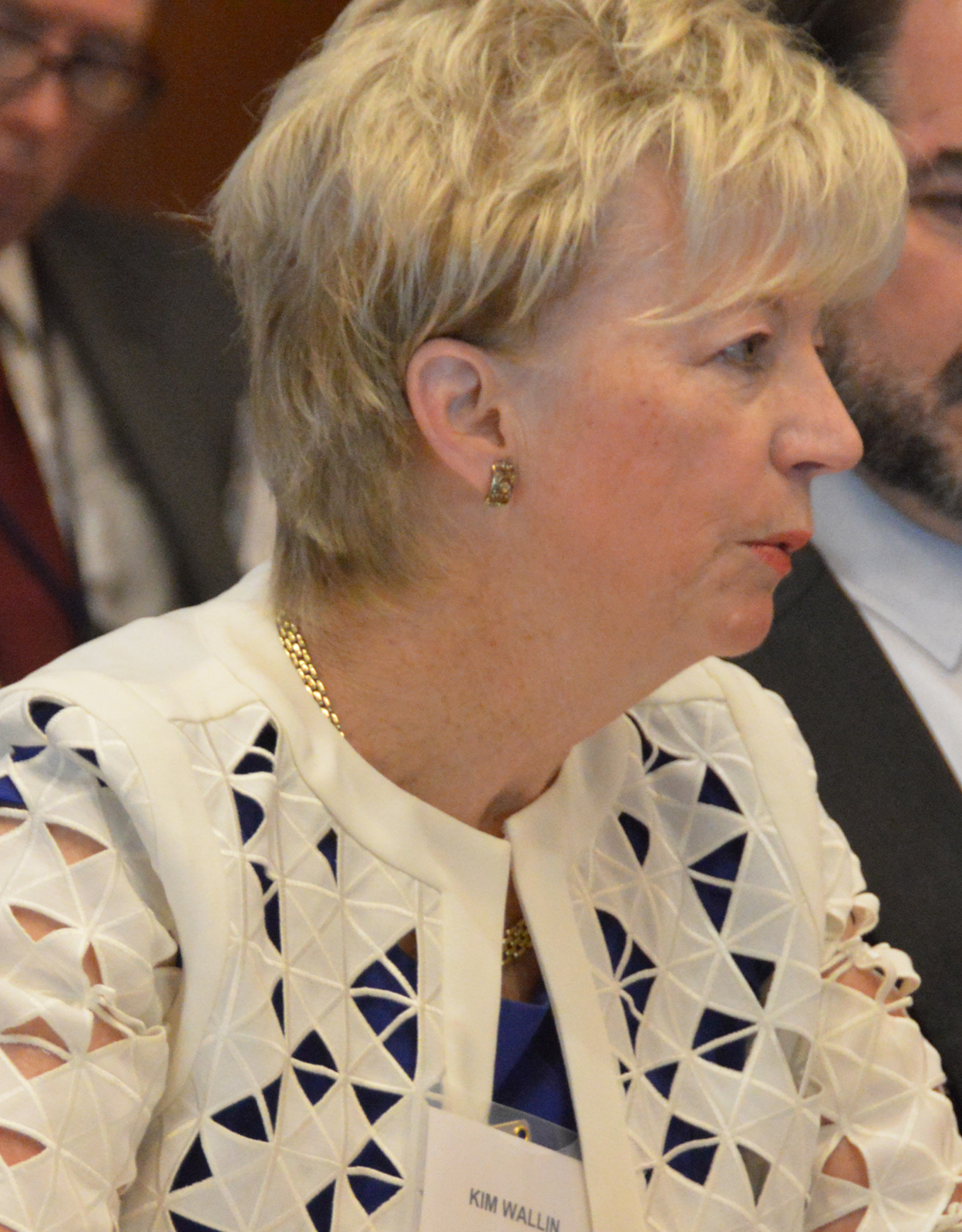

Nominee	Kim Wallin	Barry Herr	None of These Candidates
Party	Democratic	Republican
Popular vote	331,311	297,069	35,571
Percentage	47.5%	42.6%	5.1%
- County results Wallin: 40–50% 50–60% Herr: 40–50% 50–60%
State Controller before election
Kim Wallin
Democratic
Elected State Controller
Kim Wallin
Democratic

Incumbent Democratic Controller Kim Wallin won re-election.

Nevada State Controller election, 2010
Party	Candidate	Votes	%
Democratic	Kim Wallin (incumbent)	331,311	47.5
Republican	Barry Herr	297,069	42.6
n/a	None of These Candidates	35,571	5.1
Independent American	Warren Markowitz	33,668	4.8
Total votes		697,619	100.0
Democratic hold			

=== State Senate ===
Ten of the twenty-one seats of the Nevada Senate were up for election in 2010.

=== State House of Representatives ===
All forty-two seats in the Nevada Assembly were for election in 2010.

=== Judicial positions ===
Multiple judicial positions were up for election in 2010.

- Nevada judicial elections, 2010 at Judgepedia

=== Ballot measures ===
Four ballot measures had been certified.

- Nevada 2010 ballot measures at Ballotpedia

Question 1 results by county No: 70–80%; 60–70%; 50–60%

Question 2 results by county No: 70–80%; 60–70%; 50–60%; Yes: 50–60%

Question 3 results by county No: 80–90%; 70–80%; 60–70%

Question 4 results by county No: 80–90%; 70–80%; 60–70%
