= Danny Tarkanian =

American politician

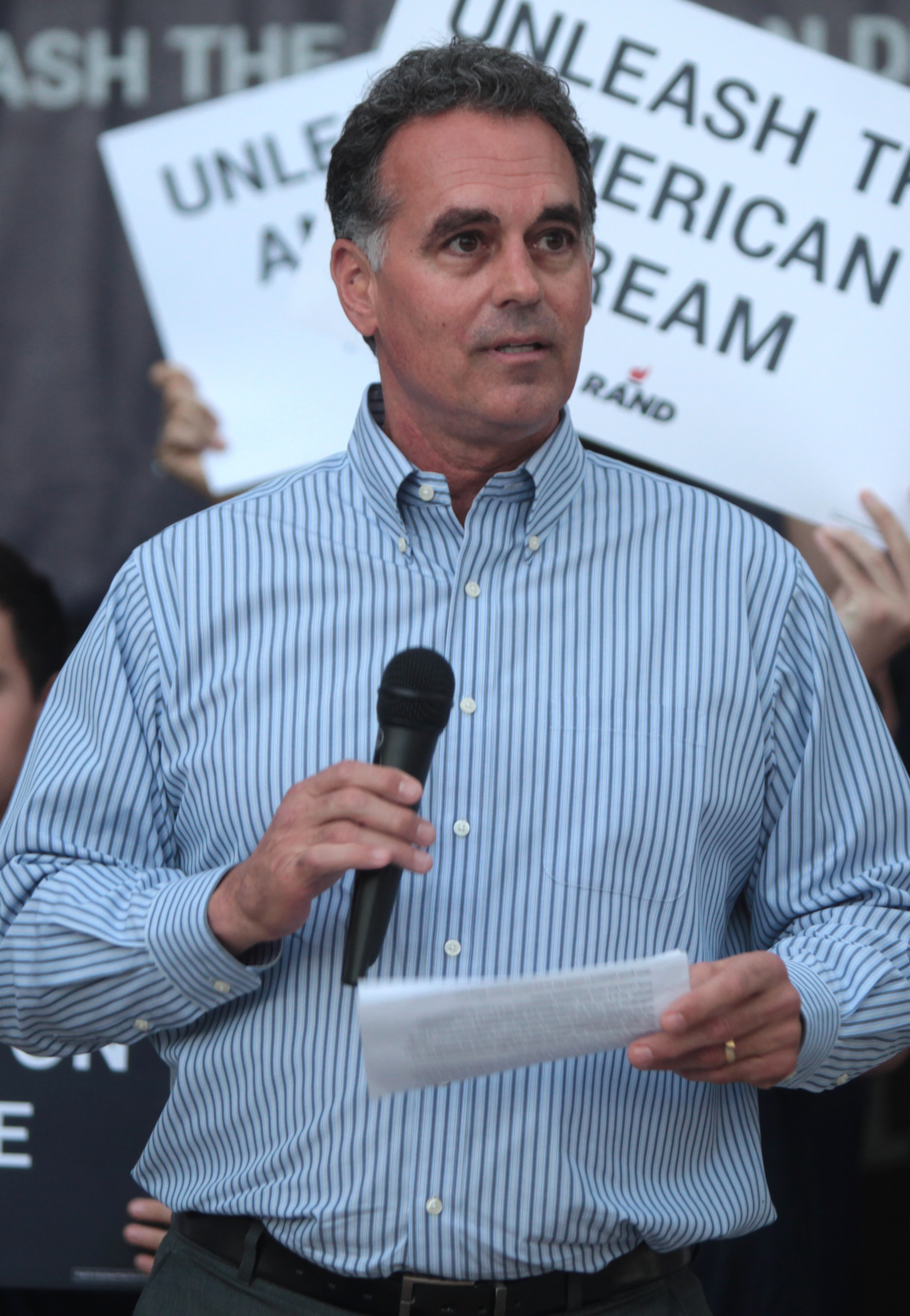

Member of the Douglas County Commission from the 1st district
- Incumbent
- Assumed office January 4, 2021
- Preceded by: Dave Nelson

Personal details
- Born: Daniel George John Tarkanian; December 18, 1961 (age 64) Redlands, California, U.S.
- Party: Republican
- Spouse: Amy Hanson (m. 2001)
- Children: 4
- Relatives: Jerry Tarkanian (father)
- Education: Utah Tech University (attended); University of Nevada, Las; Vegas (BA); University of San Diego (JD)

Daniel George John Tarkanian (born December 18, 1961) is an American attorney, businessman, perennial candidate for state office, and politician serving as a member of the Douglas County Commission since 2021. A member of the Republican Party, he was the party's nominee for Nevada Secretary of State in 2006, Nevada's 4th congressional district in 2012 and Nevada's 3rd congressional district in 2016 and 2018. He was a runner-up in Republican primaries for U.S. Senate in 2010 and Nevada's 2nd congressional district in 2022, and Nevada attorney general in 2026.

In 2020, Tarkanian was elected to the Douglas County Commission after defeating incumbent Dave Nelson in the Republican primary. He was re-elected in 2024.

== Early life, education, and legal career ==
Tarkanian was born in Redlands, California, the third of four children. He is the son of Jerry Tarkanian, a prominent, former University of Nevada, Las Vegas (UNLV) basketball coach, and Lois Tarkanian (née Huter), a former Las Vegas City Councilwoman, educator of children with disabilities, administrator, and a co-founder for California's first private school for the deaf.

Tarkanian grew up in three different California cities, (Riverside, Pasadena, and Huntington Beach) as his father progressed in his professional career.

The Tarkanian family moved to Nevada in 1973 when Danny was 12. He attended Hyde Park Junior High School in Las Vegas and later the Bishop Gorman High School. He achieved honors in all four years. At Bishop Gorman High School, he played both basketball and football, and both sports teams went into the playoffs and won state championships. In basketball, he played point guard. In football, he played quarterback and was named All-Conference and All-State at his position twice.

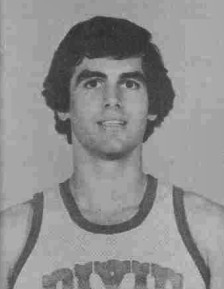
Tarkanian in 1980 as a member of the Dixie Rebels men's basketball team.

After graduating from high school, he spent one year at Dixie College, playing basketball one season for the Rebels, where his team went to the regional playoffs. He was named the school's Male Freshman of the Year.

Tarkanian then transferred to UNLV, where he was coached by his father. He played 3 seasons, 1981–1984, for the UNLV Runnin' Rebels basketball. In his sophomore year, his team won 24 straight games and was ranked number one nationally. At UNLV, Tarkanian was twice named First-Team Academic All-American by the CoSIDA.

He was drafted by the San Antonio Spurs in the 1984 NBA draft in Round 8, but did not make the team.

Following graduation, Tarkanian received his J.D. from the University of San Diego School of Law.

Tarkanian passed the Nevada Bar Exam and practiced law for eight years, four as proprietor of his own firm.

In 1995, Jerry Tarkanian became the head coach for the Fresno State Bulldogs basketball team at Fresno State, where Danny joined his father as an assistant coach. The team qualified for the post-season every year during Tarkanian's tenure.

Tarkanian moved back to Las Vegas following his father's retirement in 2002. He started a real estate investment business and he co-founded the Tarkanian Basketball Academy.

== Political campaigns ==
=== 2004 Nevada State Senate election ===
On May 4, 2004, Tarkanian filed to run in Nevada's 11th Senate district (map) against incumbent Michael A. Schneider. Schneider defeated Tarkanian in the general election.

Following the election, Tarkanian successfully sued his Democratic opponent for libel and defamation.

During the campaign, Schneider made various accusations against Tarkanian, including accusing him of involvement with the creation of illegal telemarketing companies designed to defraud the elderly. The case went to trial on July 27, 2009. Schneider stood by statements he made in a 2004 debate with Tarkanian and in campaign ads and fliers accusing Tarkanian. Former assistant U.S. Attorney Leif Reid, son of senator Harry Reid, testified that Tarkanian was not part of the investigation into the telemarketing companies. On July 31, 2009, a Clark County District Court jury ruled in Tarkanian's favor and awarded him $50,000 in damages. On August 3, 2009, Schneider agreed to pay a $150,000 settlement in the case.

=== 2006 Secretary of State election ===
In December 2005, Tarkanian announced his second bid for public office, this time a statewide election for Nevada Secretary of State. He defeated Brian Scroggins in the Republican primary and faced Democratic nominee Ross Miller, the son of former Nevada governor Bob Miller in the general election. Miller defeated Tarkanian in the general election.

=== 2010 U.S. Senate election ===
In 2009, Tarkanian announced that he would run against Democratic U.S. Senator Harry Reid. Before other candidates entered the primary, Tarkanian was the front-runner for the Republican nomination. Shortly after Tarkanian's announcement, former Nevada Republican Party chairwoman Sue Lowden and former assemblywoman Sharron Angle entered the primary field and overtook him in the polls. Tarkanian placed third in the primary, with Angle winning the nomination. Angle would go on to lose the general election to Reid.

=== 2012 U.S. House election ===
In January 2012, he announced he would run in Nevada's 4th congressional district. The district includes most of northern Clark County, as well as all or part of the rural counties of Esmeralda, Lincoln, Lyon, Mineral, Nye and White Pine. 46% of the district were registered Democrats, higher than the statewide average of 43%. Registered Republicans were 33% of the district, while they made up 35% statewide.

In June 2012, Tarkanian won the Republican primary with 32% of the vote, defeating eight other candidates. Among the eight candidates was state senator Barbara Cegavske, who had the endorsements of the party establishment. Tarkanian faced Democratic State Senate majority leader Steven Horsford in the general election. He lost to Horsford, 50%–42%. Although Tarkanian won the rural counties in the district by 2:1 margins, it was not enough to overcome a 28,800-vote deficit in the district's share of Clark County, home to four-fifths of the district's vote.

=== 2014 Nevada System of Higher Education Regent election ===
Tarkanian filed to run for NSHE Regent on March 14, 2014, and withdrew on March 25, 2014, citing that he did not want to oppose a family friend, attorney Trevor Hayes.

=== 2016 U.S. House election ===
In 2016, Tarkanian ran to represent Nevada's 3rd congressional district, an open seat. He won the Republican primary with 32% of the vote, running against Democratic nominee Jacky Rosen. Rosen won 47.23–45.96%, with Independent American candidate Warren Markowitz and independent David Goossen obtaining 3.73% and 3.07% of the vote, respectively.

After the election, Tarkanian sued Rosen for defamation.

=== 2018 elections ===
On August 8, 2017, Tarkanian announced on Fox News that he would run against incumbent Republican senator Dean Heller in the 2018 primary. Tarkanian promised to be a stronger support of president Donald Trump He ran with the endorsement of Steve Bannon, executive chairman for Breitbart News. In October 2017, Tarkanian was photographed with brothel owner Dennis Hof at a county fair. On February 1, 2018, in a meeting between Republican National Committee members and Donald Trump, Trump said that he would travel to Nevada to support Heller, who was doing well in the polls, in the Republican primary against Tarkanian.

On March 16, 2018, hours before the filing deadline and at the request of Trump, Tarkanian announced that he would be withdrawing from the Senate race and would instead run for Nevada's 3rd congressional district. He won the Republican primary on June 12, 2018, with 44.1% of the vote. He faced Democrat Susie Lee in the general election and lost 51.89–42.83%, with Libertarian candidate Steve Brown, Independent American candidate Harry Vickers, and several independent candidates carrying a combined 5.3% of the vote.

=== 2020 Douglas County Commission election ===
Tarkanian ran against incumbent Republican Dave Nelson for District 1 of the Douglas County Commission, which includes the town of Gardnerville. He defeated Nelson in the June 17 primary by 17 votes. Although Nelson indicated he would seek a recount, he ultimately decided against it. Tarkanian ran unopposed in the general election, making his primary victory tantamount to election.

=== 2022 U.S. House election ===
In 2022, Tarkanian ran as a candidate for Nevada's 2nd congressional district, mounting a primary challenge against Republican incumbent Mark Amodei.

Amodei was re-nominated with 54.87% of the vote, with Tarkanian received 32.59%, and the rest of the vote split amongst three other candidates.

As a candidate, Tarkanian has spoken in favor of banning taxpayer funding for Planned Parenthood and breaking up Big Tech companies through antitrust enforcement.

=== 2024 Douglas County Commission election ===
In 2024, Tarkanian was re-elected to a second term to District 1 of the Douglas County Commission. He won renomination 54%–46% and won the November general election with 63.75%.

=== 2026 Nevada Attorney General election ===
Tarkanian was a candidate in the 2026 Nevada attorney general election, but was defeated in the Republican primary by Adrianna Guzmán Fralick.

== Legal issues ==
In June 2012, a federal court issued a $17 million judgment against Tarkanian and his family in a California real estate deal gone bad.

In February 2018, the campaign co-chair for Dean Heller filed a complaint with the Federal Election Commission regarding a $40,000 loan that went from Tarkanian's charity basketball organization to his campaign during his 2012 candidacy.

== Personal life ==
In October 2001, Tarkanian married Amy Hanson. The couple lived in Las Vegas until 2019 when they moved to Gardnerville. They have four children. In 2011, Amy Tarkanian was elected chairwoman of the Nevada Republican Party, served about eight months, and resigned in February 2012 during her husband's primary campaign.

== Electoral history ==
2004 Nevada Senate election in Clark County District 11
Party	Candidate	Votes	%	±%
Democratic	Michael A. Schneider	13,649	54%	
Republican	Danny Tarkanian	11,746	46%	
Majority				
Turnout				
Democratic hold		Swing		

2006 Nevada Secretary of State election
Party	Candidate	Votes	%	±%
Democratic	Ross Miller	279,510	48.7%	
Republican	Danny Tarkanian	232,705	40.6%	
Independent American	Janine Hansen	38,757	6.8%	
None of These Candidates		22,666	4.0%	
Majority				
Turnout				
Democratic gain from Republican		Swing		

2010 U.S. Senate Republican primary results
Party	Candidate	Votes	%
Republican	Sharron Angle	70,422	40.1
Republican	Sue Lowden	45,871	26.1
Republican	Danny Tarkanian	40,926	23.3
Republican	John Chachas	6,925	3.9
Republican	Chad Christensen	4,803	2.7
Republican	None of These Candidates	3,090	1.8
Republican	Bill Parson	1,483	0.8
Republican	Gary Bernstein	698	0.4
Republican	Garn Mabey	462	0.2
Republican	Cecilia Stern	355	0.2
Republican	Brian Nadell	235	0.1
Republican	Terry Suominen	223	0.1
Republican	Gary Marinch	178	0.1
Total votes		175,691	100

2012 Republican primary in Nevada's 4th congressional district
Party	Candidate	Votes	%
Republican	Danny Tarkanian	7,605	31.5
Republican	Barbara Cegavske	6,674	27.7
Republican	Kenneth Wegner	5,069	21.0
Republican	Dan Schwartz	2,728	11.3
Republican	Kiran Hill	666	2.8
Republican	Diana Anderson	607	2.5
Republican	Mike Delarosa	370	1.5
Republican	Sid Zeller	252	1.0
Republican	Robert X. Leeds	165	0.7
Total votes		24,136	100

2012 general election in Nevada's 4th congressional district
Party	Candidate	Votes	%
Democratic	Steven Horsford	120,501	50.11
Republican	Danny Tarkanian	101,261	42.11
Independent American	Floyd Fitzgibbons	9,389	3.90
Libertarian	Joseph P. Silvestri	9,341	3.88
Total votes		240,492	100.0

2016 Republican primary in Nevada's 3rd congressional district
Party	Candidate	Votes	%
Republican	Daniel Tarkanian	9,002	31.98%
Republican	Michael Roberson	6,759	24.01%
Republican	Michele Fiore	5,124	18.21%
Republican	Andrew Matthews	3,975	14.12%
Republican	Kerry Bowers	1,569	5.57%
Republican	Annette Teijeiro	1,336	4.75%
Republican	Sami Khal	381	1.35%
Total votes		28,146	100.00%

2016 general election in Nevada's 3rd congressional district
Party	Candidate	Votes	%
Democratic	Jacky Rosen	146,869	47.23%
Republican	Danny Tarkanian	142,926	45.96%
Independent American	Warren Markowitz	11,602	3.73%
Independent	David Goossen	9,566	3.08%
Total votes		310,963	100.00%
Democratic gain from Republican			

2018 Republican primary in Nevada's 3rd congressional district
Party	Candidate	Votes	%
Republican	Danny Tarkanian	15,257	44.1
Republican	Michelle Mortensen	8,491	24.6
Republican	Scott Hammond	5,804	16.8
Republican	David McKeon	1,698	4.9
Republican	Annette Teijeiro	1,225	3.5
Republican	Patrick Carter	942	2.7
Republican	Stephanie Jones	450	1.3
Republican	Eddie Hamilton	360	1.0
Republican	Thomas La Croix	345	1.0
Total votes		34,572	100.0

Nevada's 3rd congressional district, 2018
Party	Candidate	Votes	%
Democratic	Susie Lee	148,501	51.9
Republican	Danny Tarkanian	122,566	42.8
Libertarian	Steve Brown	4,555	1.6
Independent	David Goossen	3,627	1.3
Independent American Party (Nevada)	Harry Vickers	3,481	1.2
Independent	Gil Eisner	1,887	0.7
Independent	Tony Gumina	1,551	0.5
Total votes		286,168	100.0
Democratic hold			

2022 Republican primary in Nevada's 2nd congressional district
Party	Candidate	Votes	%
Republican	Mark Amodei (incumbent)	49,779	54.9
Republican	Danny Tarkanian	29,563	32.6
Republican	Joel Beck	6,744	7.4
Republican	Catherine Sampson	3,010	3.3
Republican	Brian Nadell	1,614	1.8
Total votes		90,710	100.0
