= Chad Christensen =

Chad Christensen may refer to:

- Chad Christensen (Idaho politician), member of the Idaho House of Representatives
- Chad Christensen (Nevada politician), member of the Nevada State Assembly
