= James D. Torreyson =

American politician (1854–1904)

James Duncan Torreyson

Nevada Attorney General
- In office January 5, 1891 – January 7, 1895

Ormsby County district attorney
- In office 1883–1891

Personal details
- Born: February 14, 1854 Wellsburg, Virginia, US
- Died: October 27, 1904 (aged 50) Carson City, Nevada, US
- Party: Republican Party (United States)
- Education: Yale University

James Duncan Torreyson (February 14, 1854 – October 27, 1904) was the eighth attorney general of the U.S state of Nevada.

== Early life and education ==
Torreyson was born on February 14, 1854, in Wellsburg, Virginia. When Torreyson was nine years old, his family moved to Carson City Nevada. In the fall of 1873, Torreyson was admitted to the Hopkins Grammar school in New Haven, Connecticut, where he prepared for college. In 1879, Torreyson graduated from Yale University.

== Early law career and district attorney tenure ==
On January 4, 1882, Torreyson gained admittance to the State Bar of Nevada. In November 1882, Torreyson was elected district attorney of Ormsby County, winning 475 votes to 397 against incumbent Ormsby County district attorney Horace F. Bartine. Torreyson was re-elected unopposed in November 1884. In November 1886 Torreyson was again re-elected against C.M. Harris, winning 540 votes to 352. In November 1888 Torreyson was once again re-elected against Sam Lee, by a margin of 571 votes to 5 votes.

== Attorney General of Nevada (1891-1895) ==
On November 4, 1890, Torreyson was elected Attorney General of Nevada, winning 7,163 votes to 5,175 votes. On January 5, 1891, Torreyson began his tenure as attorney general. In 1894, Torreyson lost re-election. Torreyson’s tenure as attorney general ended on January 7, 1895.

== Death ==
Torreyson died on October 27, 1904. Torreyson died of heart failure.

== Personal life ==
Torreyson married Valrealma Evelyn French on August 12, 1891. Torreyson was part of a number of fraternal organizations, including the Freemasons, the Elks and the Knights of Pythias. In 1902, Torreyson became the supreme representative of the Knights of Pythias.
