= Jasper Babcock =

American politician

Jasper Babcock (April 6, 1821 - 1896) was an American politician who served as the Secretary of State for Nevada from 1879 to 1882. He was a Republican.

Babcock was born in Ashford, Connecticut. His parents moved to New York where he lived until 1852. In 1855 he gave testimony on California's state prison system.

He was preceded in office by James D. Minor. He issued a report for a two-year period. He was succeeded by John M. Dormer.
