= Nevada State Controller =

Chief financial officer of the U.S. state of Nevada

State Controller of Nevada
- Great Seal of the State of Nevada

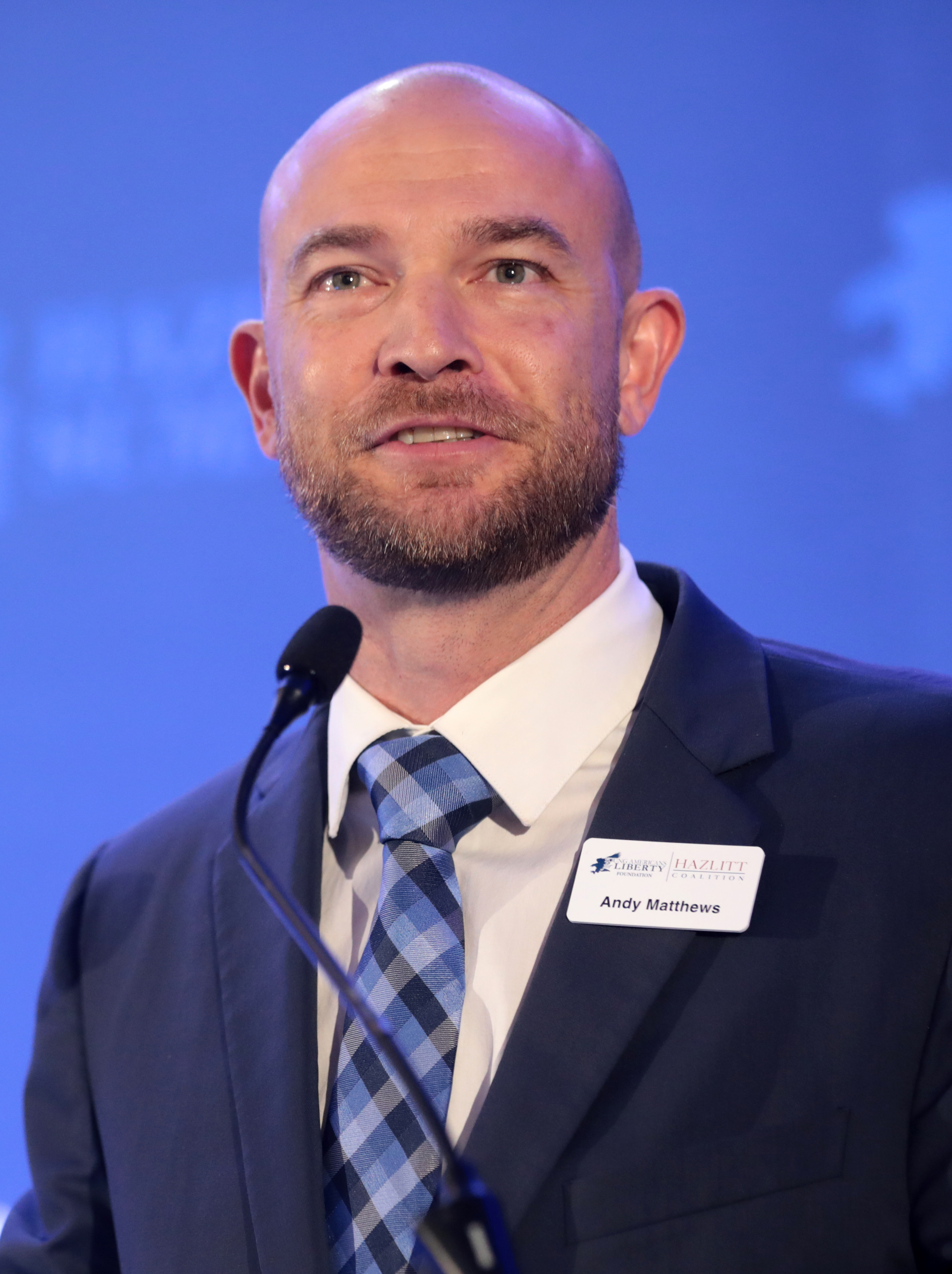
- Incumbent; Andy Matthews since January 2, 2023
- Style: Mr. or Madam Controller (informal); The Honorable (formal)
- Seat: Nevada State Capitol; Carson City, Nevada
- Appointer: General election
- Term length: Four years, no term limits
- Constituting instrument: Nevada Constitution of 1864, Article V
- Inaugural holder: Alanson W. Nightingill
- Formation: October 31, 1864 (161 years ago)
- Salary: $110,451
- Website: Official page

The Nevada state controller is a constitutional officer in the executive branch of government of the U.S. state of Nevada. Twenty-two individuals have held the office of State Controller since statehood. The incumbent is Andy Matthews, a Republican.

== Powers and duties ==
The state controller is the chief fiscal officer for the state of Nevada. In practice, this means the state controller is responsible for administering the state's accounting system and regulating the disbursement of public funds. These disparate activities serve two objectives: foremost, to provide citizens, state agencies, local governments and legislators alike with accurate and impartial information on Nevada's financial condition; and second, to protect state funds by ensuring that they are properly accounted for and spent in the most efficient and cost effective manner at all times.

=== Governmental accounting ===
With respect to accounting, the state controller processes and records the state's financial transactions, settles the accounts of county treasurers and receivers of state tax revenues, collects debts owed the state, and ensures compliance with constitutional, statutory, and regulatory internal controls. In keeping with this function, the state controller prepares the state of Nevada's financial statements and schedule of expenditures of federal awards, which are in turn audited by external auditors approved by the Legislative Auditor. The state controller is also charged with recommending plans to the Legislature for the support of the public credit, to promote frugality and efficiency within state government operations, and better manage the state's cash flow. This mandate for accountability extends to the state controller's reports on the financial health of Nevada's Permanent School Fund, a permanent fund created at statehood and derived from the proceeds of liquidated State Trust Lands to support public schools throughout the state indefinitely. Using fund accounting techniques, the state controller issues quarterly reports on the fund's revenues, expenditures, investment performance, and balances. The State Controller's Office publishes these reports online.

=== Disbursements of public money ===
In most states, the accounts payable and cash management functions are performed by different state officials. The same reality holds true in Nevada, where the state controller (as chief fiscal officer) processes accounts payable while the state treasurer (as chief banker and investment officer) is responsible for cash management. Thus, the state controller registers vendors procured by state agencies, administers payroll to state employees, audits and allows - or disallows - claims against the state, and issues warrants on the state treasury in payment of claims allowed. This important separation of duties assures no sum of money can be paid out by the state treasurer except with the prior authorization of the state controller.

=== Other responsibilities ===
The state controller is a member of the State Board of Finance, the Executive Branch Audit Committee, and the Transportation Board of Directors. The State Board of Finance approves and periodically reviews the state treasurer's investment policies for both the State Investment Fund and the assets held in the Local Government Pooled Investment Fund. On the other hand, the Executive Branch Audit Committee sets the annual internal audit plan of the Office of Finance and receives its final audit reports. Finally, the Transportation Board of Directors is an independent policymaking body that oversees the governance and financial administration of the Nevada Department of Transportation. In addition to the state controller, the Transportation Board of Directors consists of the governor, the lieutenant governor, and four gubernatorial appointees representing DOT's three service regions.

== List of state controllers ==
Democratic (6) Republican (15) Silver (2)

| # | Image | State Controller | Party | Term start | Term end |
|---|---|---|---|---|---|
| 1 | | Alanson W. Nightingill | Republican | 1864 | 1867 |
| 2 | | William K. Parkinson | Republican | 1867 | 1869 |
| 3 | | Lewis Doron | Republican | 1869 | 1871 |
| 4 | | William W. Hobart | Republican | 1871 | 1879 |
| 5 | | James F. Hallock | Republican | 1879 | 1891 |
| 6 | | Robert L. Horton | Republican | 1891 | 1895 |
| 7 | | C. A. LaGrave | Silver | 1895 | 1899 |
| 8 | | Samuel Post Davis | Silver–Democratic | 1899 | 1907 |
| 9 | | Jacob Eggers | Republican | 1907 | 1915 |
| 10 | | George A. Cole | Democratic | 1915 | 1927 |
| 11 | | Edward C. Peterson | Republican | 1927 | 1935 |
| 12 | | Henry C. Schmidt | Democratic | 1935 | 1947 |
| 13 | | Jerome P. Donovan | Democratic | 1947 | 1951 |
| 14 | | Peter Merialdo | Republican | 1951 | 1959 |
| 15 | | Keith L. Lee | Democratic | 1959 | 1967 |
| 16 | | Wilson McGowan | Republican | 1967 | 1983 |
| 17 | | Darrel R. Daines | Republican | 1983 | 1999 |
| 18 | | Kathy Augustine | Republican | 1999 | 2006 |
| 19 | | Steve Martin | Republican | 2006 | 2007 |
| 20 | | Kim Wallin | Democratic | 2007 | 2015 |
| 21 | | Ron Knecht | Republican | 2015 | 2019 |
| 22 | | Catherine Byrne | Democratic | 2019 | 2023 |
| 23 | | Andy Matthews | Republican | 2023 | present |

== See also ==
- Government of Nevada
- Constitution of Nevada
- Nevada's five other executive officers: governor, lieutenant governor, attorney general, secretary of state, and treasurer.
