= Kim Wallin =

American politician

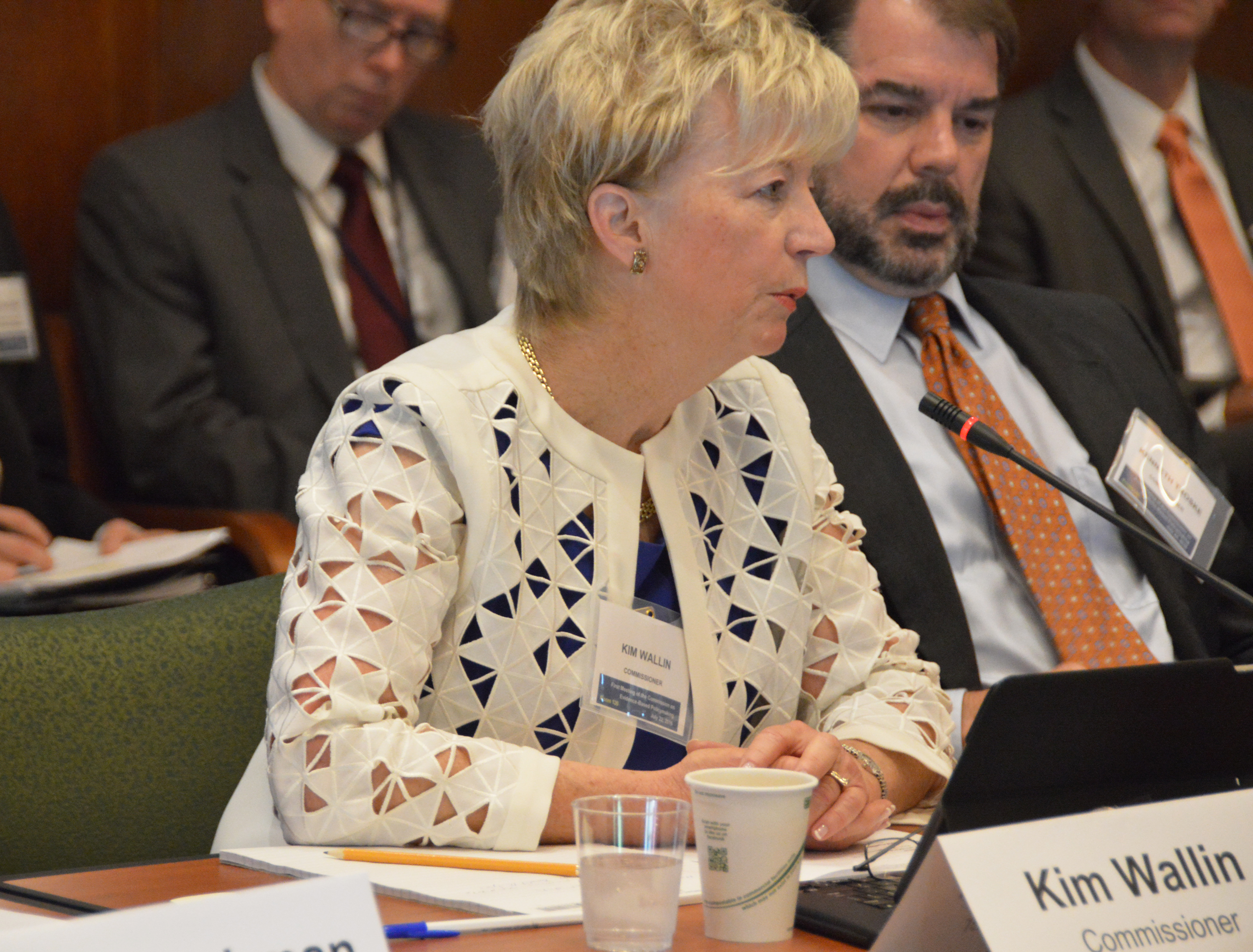

20th Nevada State Controller
- In office January 20, 2007 – January 5, 2015
- Governor: Jim Gibbons; Brian Sandoval
- Preceded by: Steve Martin
- Succeeded by: Ron Knecht

Personal details
- Born: Deborah Ruth Wallin; October 20, 1956 (age 69) Nevada, U.S.
- Party: Democratic
- Education: University of Nevada, Las Vegas
- Profession: Accountant and politician
- Website: Official website

Deborah Ruth "Kim" Wallin (born October 20, 1956) is an American accountant and politician. She was the Nevada State Controller. She is a member of the Democratic Party.

As of 2024 she is the most recent State Controller to have served two terms.

== Personal life and education ==
Wallin graduated from University of Nevada, Las Vegas with a degree in accounting. Wallin' hobbies include wine tasting, gourmet cooking, golf, skiing, hiking, and Aikido.

== Career ==
Wallin ran her own accounting firm, D. K. Wallin, LTD, for 22 years before being elected to public office. She is a CPA, CMA, and CFM. Accounting Today recognized Wallin as one of the top 100 most influential people in accounting. Wallin served as chair of the Institute of Management Accountants.

Wallin was elected State Controller of Nevada in 2006, beating Incumbent Republican Steve Martin 45.2% to 43.9%. She was re-elected in 2010, defeating Republican Barry Herr 47.5% to 42.5%.

Wallin applied XBRL to government initiatives. She established a fraud hotline on her agency's website, in order to aid Nevadans in reporting questionable practices. Wallin advocates moving the state away from relying on casino revenue.

The Clark County Republican Party filed a complaint against Kim Wallin with the Nevada Secretary of State on July 9, 2014, seeking an inquiry into whether she misappropriated campaign funds for personal gain.

Term-limited in 2014, Wallin ran for Nevada State Treasurer, but was defeated by Republican Dan Schwartz.

Political offices
Preceded by Steve Martin	State Controller of Nevada; January 20, 2007 – January 5, 2015	Succeeded by Ron Knecht
