= Adam Laxalt =

American attorney and politician (born 1978)

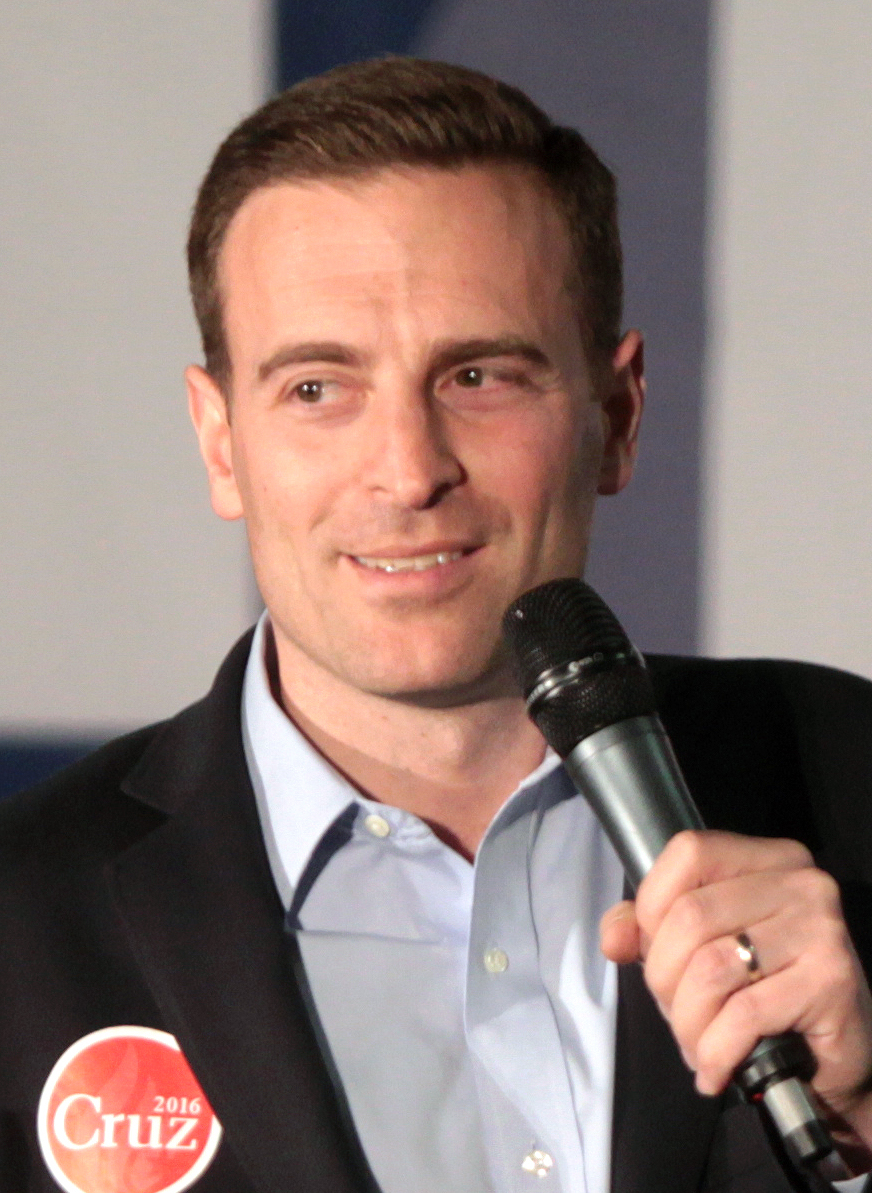
- Laxalt in 2016

33rd Attorney General of Nevada
- In office January 5, 2015 – January 7, 2019
- Governor: Brian Sandoval
- Preceded by: Catherine Cortez Masto
- Succeeded by: Aaron Ford

Personal details
- Born: August 31, 1978 (age 48) Reno, Nevada, U.S.
- Party: Republican
- Spouse: Jaime Laxalt
- Children: 4
- Parent: Pete Domenici (father)
- Relatives: Paul Laxalt (grandfather)
- Education: Tulane University; Georgetown University (BA, JD)

Military service
- Branch/service: United States Navy
- Years of service: 2005–2010
- Rank: Lieutenant
- Unit: Judge Advocate General's Corps
- Battles/wars: Iraq War
- Awards: Joint Service Commendation Medal

Adam Paul Laxalt (/ˈlæksɔːlt/ LAK-sawlt; born August 31, 1978) is an American attorney and politician who served as the 33rd Nevada Attorney General from 2015 to 2019. Laxalt is the son of Pete Domenici, who represented New Mexico in the U.S. Senate, and the grandson of Paul Laxalt, a former governor and senator from Nevada. He is a member of the Republican Party.

A graduate from Georgetown University and its law school, Laxalt started his career before working as an aide to Under Secretary of State John Bolton and later Senator John Warner. He worked as a lawyer in private practice and was a member of the Navy Judge Advocate General's Corps from 2005 to 2010 before running for office in 2014.

Laxalt was elected attorney general of Nevada in 2014. As attorney general, he established a Federalism Unit and challenged Obama administration policies on environmental regulation, immigration, and abortion. He went on to mount an unsuccessful gubernatorial campaign in 2018 and later co-chaired Donald Trump's 2020 reelection campaign in Nevada.

Laxalt later ran for U.S. Senate in 2022, winning the Republican nomination but narrowly losing to incumbent Catherine Cortez Masto, 48.81%–48.04%.

== Early life and education ==
Laxalt was born in Reno, Nevada, the son of Pete Domenici, a Republican senator from New Mexico, and Michelle Laxalt. He is the grandson of former Republican Nevada Governor and U.S. Senator Paul Laxalt. Laxalt's mother raised him as a single parent. Laxalt's parents did not publicly acknowledge his paternity until 2013. At that time, Domenici acknowledged that Laxalt was his son and was born as a result of an extramarital affair.

After graduating from St. Stephen's & St. Agnes School, a college preparatory school in Alexandria, Virginia, Laxalt enrolled at Tulane University. After attending Tulane for two years, he transferred to Georgetown University, where he graduated magna cum laude in 2001 with a Bachelor of Arts degree in political science and government. He graduated from Georgetown University Law Center with a Juris Doctor degree in 2005.

== Career ==
Laxalt first worked for then-Under Secretary of State for Arms Control and International Security Affairs John R. Bolton, before joining the office of Virginia U.S. Senator John Warner. After leaving Washington, Laxalt worked for the law firm Lewis Roca Rothgerber Christie at its Reno office until 2014, when he left the firm to concentrate on his bid for attorney general.

=== Military service ===
Laxalt spent five years in the United States Navy's Judge Advocate General's Corps. He had postings at Naval Air Station Sigonella in Italy and in Iraq, and a stint at the U.S. Naval Academy as an assistant law professor.

=== Attorney general of Nevada ===
After practicing with Lewis Roca Rothgerber, Laxalt considered a campaign for Nevada Attorney General. In January 2014, he announced his candidacy. Laxalt was the Republican nominee in the general election. After a bitter and costly general election campaign, Laxalt defeated Democratic nominee Ross Miller. During the campaign, Laxalt said that he opposed same-sex marriage; in 2010, he said that he opposed LGBT individuals openly serving in the military.

Laxalt was sworn in as attorney general of Nevada on January 5, 2015. As AG, he created the "Federalism Unit" within the AG's office and challenged federal environmental protection regulations, including the Environmental Protection Agency's Waters of the United States Rule and the Bureau of Land Management's Sage Grouse Plan. Laxalt also joined lawsuits against the Obama administration over a U.S. Department of Labor regulation to protect certain employees' right to overtime pay, and over Obama's executive action creating the Deferred Action for Childhood Arrivals (DACA) and Deferred Action for Parents of Americans (DAPA) programs.

In a 2017 speech at the National Rifle Association of America's general convention, Laxalt criticized a red flag bill that the Nevada Senate had passed. Months afterwards in 2018, the NRA called for greater adoption of these laws, he recommended that the legislature consider such a law.

As attorney general, Laxalt signed Nevada onto at least four known lawsuits supporting abortion restrictions in other states. He signed onto two lawsuits supporting bans on the most commonly used second-trimester abortion procedure. Pro-choice Republican governor Brian Sandoval's office said it was not consulted before Laxalt signed Nevada onto the Texas abortion ban brief. In the Supreme Court case Whole Woman's Health v. Hellerstedt, Laxalt signed an amicus brief in support of Texas's TRAP (Targeted Regulation of Abortion Providers) law.

Laxalt signed onto a California lawsuit to support keeping secret the identities of political donors, including one of his biggest political donors, the Americans for Prosperity Foundation, backed by Charles and David Koch. He opposed a multi-state investigation into ExxonMobil's alleged role in downplaying climate change, condemning it as an attempt to stifle an "ongoing public policy debate" over human-caused global warming. Laxalt took legal action to keep fraud investigators from scrutinizing groups connected to the Koch network, which went on to spend $2.5 million to support Laxalt's gubernatorial campaign.

Laxalt created the Office of Military Legal Assistance, which provided free legal services to veterans.

=== 2018 Nevada gubernatorial campaign ===
Laxalt was the Republican nominee for governor of Nevada in the 2018 election, defeating four other candidates to win the nomination. He lost to the Democratic nominee, Clark County Commission chair Steve Sisolak, in the general election; Sisolak become the first Democrat to win the governorship in 20 years. Sisolak received 49.39% of the vote to Laxalt's 45.31%.

Asked whether he would propose a referendum to put Nevada's abortion law up for a vote, Laxalt said, "We are going to look into it."

During his 2018 gubernatorial campaign, Laxalt released a health care plan that "reiterated Laxalt's long-standing opposition to Obamacare, but pledged not to roll back Medicaid coverage the law helped extend to more than 200,000 of Nevada's poorest residents."

Laxalt was endorsed by President Donald Trump. Incumbent Republican governor Brian Sandoval did not endorse a candidate in the election to succeed him, saying he would not "support a candidate that is going to undo anything that I put forward." During Sandoval's tenure as governor, he and Laxalt had a frequently tense relationship, with disagreements over tax policy, environmental regulations and gambling regulations.

Laxalt was endorsed by Storey County Sheriff Gerald Antinoro in November 2017. Laxalt faced scrutiny for initially declining to disavow Antinoro's campaign support. A 2016 investigation found that Antinoro had sexually harassed his top deputy. Storey County Administrator Austin Osborne said in a deposition that numerous complaints including sexual harassment allegations were filed against Antinoro. In July 2018, Laxalt released an investigative report into Antinoro and announced that he would not pursue criminal charges. After the investigation concluded, Laxalt announced he would no longer campaign with Antinoro or use his endorsement.

=== Donald Trump 2020 election campaign ===
Laxalt co-chaired Donald Trump's 2020 reelection campaign in Nevada. Before Election Day, he unsuccessfully sought to stop Nevada from counting early-voting ballots from Clark County (the state's most populous, Democratic-leaning county, containing Las Vegas).

After Trump lost Nevada to Joe Biden, Laxalt claimed without evidence that large-scale voter fraud had occurred in Nevada and sought to overturn the election results. He and other Trump campaign officials provided no information supporting their claim of fraud. Laxalt presented a list of 3,062 voters he said were non-residents who voted absentee in Clark County. Nevada residents such as military personnel, students, and congressional staffers do not have to live in Nevada to be eligible voters in the state. At least 146 of the names on Laxalt's list, which the Trump campaign claimed was evidence of "criminal voter fraud", were linked to military base addresses or diplomatic postal addresses.

Laxalt also claimed that 200,000 mail-in ballot votes were verified by machine only and that these machines were unable to match signatures on ballots to those on file; in fact, ballots that could not be assessed by machines were verified by people.

=== 2022 U.S. Senate campaign ===
In August 2021, Laxalt announced his candidacy for the 2022 United States Senate election in Nevada, challenging the incumbent, Democrat Catherine Cortez Masto. He announced his candidacy with a video in which he said that "the radical left, rich elites, woke corporations, academia and the media" were "taking over America". The campaign was anticipated to be among the most competitive Senate races in 2022.

Laxalt won the Republican primary in June 2022.

On November 12, 2022, major media outlets projected that Cortez Masto had been reelected, guaranteeing the Democrats 50 Senate seats and control of the chamber in the 118th Congress.

=== Subsequent activities ===
In April 2023, Laxalt became the chair of the Never Back Down Super PAC, a group supporting Florida Governor Ron DeSantis for president in 2024. He stepped down from his role with the PAC in November 2023.

== Personal life ==
In 1997, Laxalt was arrested for driving under the influence. He has acknowledged having a drinking problem in his teens. He received treatment at the Hazelden Foundation and says he has been sober since the age of 19.

Laxalt is married to Jaime, with whom he has four children.

== Electoral history ==
Nevada Attorney General election, 2014
Party	Candidate	Votes	%	±%
Republican	Adam Laxalt	251,539	46.21	+10.21
Democratic	Ross Miller	246,671	45.31	−7.49
Independent American	Jonathan Hansen	30,530	5.61	−2.19
None of These Candidates	None of These Candidates	15,643	2.87	−0.83
Total votes		544,383	100	
Republican gain from Democratic		Swing	+18.05	

2018 Nevada gubernatorial election
Party	Candidate	Votes	%	±%
Democratic	Steve Sisolak	480,007	49.39%	+25.51%
Republican	Adam Laxalt	440,320	45.31%	−25.27%
None of These Candidates	None of These Candidates	18,865	1.94%	−0.94%
Independent	Ryan Bundy	13,891	1.43%	N/A
Independent American	Russell Best	10,076	1.04%	−1.62%
Libertarian	Jared Lord	8,640	0.89%	N/A
Total votes		971,799	100.00	N/A
Democratic gain from Republican		Swing		

2022 United States Senate election in Nevada
Party	Candidate	Votes	%	±%
Democratic	Catherine Cortez Masto (incumbent)	498,316	48.81%	+1.71%
Republican	Adam Laxalt	490,388	48.04%	+3.37%
None of These Candidates		12,441	1.22%	-2.59%
Independent	Barry Lindemann	8,075	0.79%	N/A
Libertarian	Neil Scott	6,422	0.63%	N/A
Independent American	Barry Rubinson	5,208	0.51%	−1.04%
Total votes		1,020,850	100.00	
Democratic hold				

Legal offices
Preceded by Catherine Cortez Masto	Attorney General of Nevada; 2015–2019	Succeeded by Aaron Ford
Party political offices
Preceded by Brian Sandoval	Republican nominee for Governor of Nevada; 2018	Succeeded by Joe Lombardo
Preceded by Joe Heck	Republican nominee for U.S. Senator from Nevada (Class 3); 2022	Most recent
