= Barbara Cegavske =

American businesswoman and politician

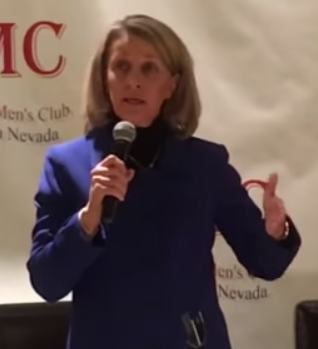
- Cegavske in 2018

17th Secretary of State of Nevada
- In office January 5, 2015 – January 2, 2023
- Governor: Brian Sandoval; Steve Sisolak
- Preceded by: Ross Miller
- Succeeded by: Cisco Aguilar

Member of the Nevada Senate from the 8th district
- In office 2002–2014
- Preceded by: Mark James
- Succeeded by: Patricia Farley

Member of the Nevada Assembly from the 5th district
- In office 1996–2002
- Preceded by: Jeannine Stroth
- Succeeded by: Valerie Weber

Personal details
- Born: Barbara Katherine Jewson; August 27, 1951 (age 75) Faribault, Minnesota, U.S.
- Party: Republican
- Spouse: Tim Cegavske
- Children: 2
- Education: College of Southern Nevada (BA)

Barbara Katherine Cegavske (née Jewson; born August 27, 1951) is an American businesswoman and politician, who is the former Secretary of State of Nevada from 2015 to 2023. She was a Republican member of the Nevada Senate, representing District 8 from 2002 to 2014. Previously, she served in the Nevada Assembly from 1996 to 2001. According to her legislative biography, she was educated at Mayo High School in Rochester, Minnesota, and at Clark County Community College (now known as the College of Southern Nevada) in Las Vegas. With her husband, Tim, she was a 7-11 convenience store franchisee for thirteen years before seeking political office.

Cegavske is a member of the American Legislative Exchange Council (ALEC), serving as Nevada state leader in 2012.

Cegavske successfully ran for the office of Secretary of State of Nevada in 2014, defeating Democratic state treasurer Kate Marshall. Cegavske supports voter ID laws and opposes same-day voter registration. She was re-elected in 2018, very narrowly defeating Democrat Nelson Araujo. With the defeat of several fellow Republicans in that election, Cegavske became the only member of her party holding statewide elected office in Nevada.

After Joe Biden won the 2020 election and Donald Trump lost while refusing to concede, Cegavske was censured by the Nevada Republican Party for not having conducted an investigation into allegations of fraud and for "dismissive public statements regarding election integrity concerns." However, her office subsequently conducted a detailed investigation of the fraud claims, logging over 125 hours of staff time. On Wednesday, April 21 she announced to the Nevada GOP that she found no evidence to support the claims after of having reviewed 122,918 records supplied by the state GOP.

== Electoral history ==
Cegavske was elected in 1996 to the Nevada Assembly from the Clark County 5th District.

Nevada State Assembly, Clark District 5 Primary Election, 1996
Party	Candidate	Votes	%
Republican	Barbara Cegavske	942	46.73
Republican	Jeannine Stroth	799	39.63
Republican	Harry Pappas	275	13.64

Nevada State Assembly, Clark District 5 General Election, 1996
Party	Candidate	Votes	%
Republican	Barbara Cegavske	6,883	77.46
Libertarian	Patrick O'Neill	2,003	22.54

Nevada State Assembly, Clark District 5 General Election, 1998
Party	Candidate	Votes	%
Republican	Barbara Cegavske	6,392	100

Nevada State Assembly, Clark District 5 General Election, 2000
Party	Candidate	Votes	%
Republican	Barbara Cegavske	6,457	54.63
Democratic	Kristen Hansen	5,362	45.37

Nevada State Senate, Clark District 8 Primary Election, 2002
Party	Candidate	Votes	%
Republican	Barbara Cegavske	3,738	55.93
Republican	Tom Christensen	2,945	44.07

Nevada State Senate, Clark District 8 General Election, 2002
Party	Candidate	Votes	%
Republican	Barbara Cegavske	15,854	62.55
Democratic	Kristin Hansen	9,491	37.45

Nevada State Senate, Clark District 8 Primary Election, 2006
Party	Candidate	Votes	%
Republican	Barbara Cegavske	3,951	62.05
Republican	Tim Cory	2,416	37.95

Nevada State Senate, Clark District 8 General Election, 2006
Party	Candidate	Votes	%
Republican	Barbara Cegavske	14,884	54.51
Democratic	Chanda Cook	12,421	45.49

Nevada State Senate, Clark District 8 General Election, 2010
Party	Candidate	Votes	%
Republican	Barbara Cegavske	17,127	55.79
Democratic	Tammy Peterson	13,573	44.21

Nevada's 4th congressional district, Primary 2012
Party	Candidate	Votes	%
Republican	Danny Tarkanian	7,605	31.51
Republican	Barbara Cegavske	6,674	27.65
Republican	Kenneth A. Wegner	5,069	21
Republican	Dan Schwartz	2,728	11.3
Republican	Kiran Hill	666	2.76
Republican	Diana Anderson	607	2.51
Republican	Mike Dela Rosa	370	1.53
Republican	Sid Zeller	252	1.04
Republican	Robert X. Leeds	165	0.68

Nevada State Secretary of State election, 2014
Party	Candidate	Votes	%	±%
Republican	Barbara Cegavske	273,872	50.41	+13.11
Democratic	Kate Marshall	250,671	46.14	−7.06
None of These Candidates	None of These Candidates	18,799	3.46	−6.14
Total votes		543,342	100	
Republican gain from Democratic				

Nevada State Secretary of State election, 2018
Party	Candidate	Votes	%	±%
Republican	Barbara Cegavske	467,880	48.91	−1.5
Democratic	Nelson Araujo	461,551	48.25	+2.11
None of These Candidates	None of These Candidates	27,200	2.84	−0.62
Total votes		956,631	100	
Republican hold				

Political offices
Preceded by Ross Miller	Secretary of State of Nevada; 2015–2023	Succeeded by Cisco Aguilar
