= Nevada's 4th congressional district =

U.S. House district for Nevada

Coordinates: 37.7900°N 117.6300°W

- Interactive map of district boundaries since January 3, 2023
- Representative: Steven Horsford; D–Las Vegas
- Population (2025): 863,918
- Median household income: $82,130
- Ethnicity: 37.3% White; 34.4% Hispanic; 15.9% Black; 5.3% Asian; 5.3% Two or more races; 1.9% other
- Cook PVI: D+2

Nevada's 4th congressional district is a congressional district that was created as a result of the 2010 United States census. Located in the central portion of the state, it includes most of northern Clark County, southern Lyon County, most of Lincoln County, a sliver of Churchill County and all of Esmeralda, Mineral, and Nye counties.

Although the district appears rural, over 80% of its population lives in the heavily Democratic northern portion of Clark County. As a result, the district leans Democratic.

The district has flipped between Democratic and Republican representation since it was created. Democrat Steven Horsford won the election for this seat in the 2012 House elections. He was seated for the 113th U.S. Congress in 2013 as the district's first congressman, serving just one term before he was defeated by Republican Cresent Hardy in November 2014. In turn, Hardy lost to Democrat Ruben Kihuen in 2016. Kihuen did not run for reelection in 2018, and the seat was won by Horsford in a rematch against Hardy.

== Recent election results from statewide races ==
Year	Office	Results
2008	President	Obama 59% - 38%
2010	Senate	Reid 57% - 43%
2010	Governor	Reid 50.1% - 49.9%
2010	Secretary of State	Miller 63% - 37%
2010	Treasurer	Marshall 57% - 43%
2012	President	Obama 59% - 41%
2016	President	Clinton 52% - 42%
2016	Senate	Cortez Masto 51% - 40%
2018	Senate	Rosen 54% - 41%
2018	Governor	Sisolak 53% - 41%
2018	Lt. Governor	Marshall 54% - 40%
2018	Secretary of State	Araujo 52% - 45%
2018	Treasurer	Conine 52% - 43%
2018	Attorney General	Ford 52% - 43%
2020	President	Biden 53% - 45%
2022	Senate	Cortez Masto 51% - 46%
2022	Governor	Sisolak 49% - 46%
2022	Lt. Governor	Cano Burkhead 48% - 47%
2022	Secretary of State	Aguilar 51% - 45%
2022	Treasurer	Conine 50% - 43%
2022	Controller	Spiegel 48% - 47%
2022	Attorney General	Ford 54% - 43%
2024	President	Harris 50% - 48%
2024	Senate	Rosen 50% - 43%

== Composition ==
For the 118th and successive Congresses (based on redistricting following the 2020 census), the district contains all or portions of the following counties and communities:

Clark County (11)

Bunkerville, Henderson (part; also 1st), Indian Springs, Las Vegas (part; also 1st and 3rd), Mesquite, Moapa Town, Moapa Valley, Mount Charleston, Nellis AFB, North Las Vegas (part; also 1st), Sunrise Manor (part; also 1st)

Esmerelda County (3)

All 3 communities

Lincoln County (11)

All 11 communities

Lyon County (1)

Smith Valley (part; also 2nd)

Mineral County (4)

All 4 communities

Nye County (5)

All 5 communities

== List of members representing the district ==
Member (Residence)	Party	Years	Cong ress	Electoral history	District location
District established January 3, 2013
Steven Horsford (Las Vegas)	Democratic	January 3, 2013 – January 3, 2015	113th	Elected in 2012. Lost re-election.	2013–2023 Esmeralda, Lincoln, Mineral, Nye, and White Pine; parts of Clark and Lyon
Cresent Hardy (Mesquite)	Republican	January 3, 2015 – January 3, 2017	114th	Elected in 2014. Lost re-election.	2013–2023 Esmeralda, Lincoln, Mineral, Nye, and White Pine; parts of Clark and Lyon
Ruben Kihuen (Las Vegas)	Democratic	January 3, 2017 – January 3, 2019	115th	Elected in 2016. Retired.	2013–2023 Esmeralda, Lincoln, Mineral, Nye, and White Pine; parts of Clark and Lyon
Steven Horsford (Las Vegas)	Democratic	January 3, 2019 – present	116th 117th 118th 119th	Elected in 2018. Re-elected in 2020. Re-elected in 2022. Re-elected in 2024. Re-elected in 2026.	2013–2023 Esmeralda, Lincoln, Mineral, Nye, and White Pine; parts of Clark and Lyon
Steven Horsford (Las Vegas)	Democratic	January 3, 2019 – present	116th 117th 118th 119th	Elected in 2018. Re-elected in 2020. Re-elected in 2022. Re-elected in 2024. Re-elected in 2026.	2023–present Esmeralda, Mineral, and Nye; parts of Clark, Churchill, Lincoln, and Lyon

== Election results ==
=== 2012 ===
2012 United States House of Representatives elections in Nevada
Party	Candidate	Votes	%
Democratic	Steven Horsford	120,501	50.11
Republican	Danny Tarkanian	101,261	42.11
Independent American	Floyd Fitzgibbons	9,389	3.90
Libertarian	Michael Haines	9,341	3.88
Total votes		240,492	100.0
Democratic win (new seat)			

=== 2014 ===
2014 United States House of Representatives elections in Nevada
Party	Candidate	Votes	%
Republican	Cresent Hardy	63,466	48.53
Democratic	Steven Horsford (Incumbent)	59,844	45.76
Libertarian	Steve Brown	4,119	3.15
Independent American	Russell Best	3,352	2.56
Total votes		130,781	100.0
Republican gain from Democratic			

=== 2016 ===
2016 United States House of Representatives elections in Nevada
Party	Candidate	Votes	%
Democratic	Ruben Kihuen	128,985	48.52
Republican	Cresent Hardy (Incumbent)	118,328	44.51
Libertarian	Steve Brown	10,206	3.84
Independent American	Mike Little	8,327	3.13
Total votes		265,846	100.0
Democratic gain from Republican			

=== 2018 ===
2018 United States House of Representatives elections in Nevada
Party	Candidate	Votes	%
Democratic	Steven Horsford	121,936	51.93
Republican	Cresent Hardy	102,740	43.75
Independent American	Warren Markowitz	3,180	1.35
Independent	Rodney Smith	2,731	1.16
Libertarian	Greg Luckner	2,213	0.94
Independent	Dean McGonigle	2,031	0.86
Total votes		234,831	100.0
Democratic hold			

=== 2020 ===
2020 United States House of Representatives elections in Nevada
Party	Candidate	Votes	%
Democratic	Steven Horsford (incumbent)	168,457	50.7
Republican	Jim Marchant	152,284	45.8
Libertarian	Jonathan Royce Esteban	7,978	2.4
Independent American	Barry Rubinson	3,750	1.1
Total votes		332,469	100.0
Democratic hold			

=== 2022 ===
2022 United States House of Representatives elections in Nevada
Party	Candidate	Votes	%
Democratic	Steven Horsford (incumbent)	116,617	52.4
Republican	Sam Peters	105,870	47.6
Total votes		222,487	100.0
Democratic hold			

=== 2024 ===
2024 Nevada's 4th congressional district election
Party	Candidate	Votes	%
Democratic	Steven Horsford (incumbent)	174,926	52.7
Republican	John Lee	148,061	44.6
Independent American	Russell Best	4,919	1.5
Libertarian	Timothy Ferreira	4,300	1.3
Total votes		332,206	100.0
Democratic hold			
