= Chad Christensen (Nevada politician) =

American politician from Nevada

Chad Christensen is an American politician. He is a former member of the Nevada State Assembly where he served as a Republican and one of the two minority whips. He served from 2003 to 2005. He ran for the Republican nomination to run in 2010 for the United States Senate but lost in the primary. He is a Mormon.
