= Nelson Araujo =

American politician from the state of Nevada

Member of the Nevada Assembly from the 3rd district
- In office November 5, 2014 – November 7, 2018
- Preceded by: Peggy Pierce
- Succeeded by: Selena Torres

Personal details
- Born: October 24, 1987 (age 38) Las Vegas, Nevada, U.S.
- Party: Democratic
- Education: University of Nevada, Las Vegas (BA, MPA)
- Website: Campaign website

Nelson Araujo (born October 24, 1987) is an American politician. He served as a Democratic member of the Nevada Assembly.

== Early life ==
Araujo was born in Las Vegas, Nevada in 1987. His parents were refugees from the Salvadoran Civil War. He was raised by his mother, who worked as a housekeeper in a hotel.

Araujo earned a B.A. and M.P.A. from the University of Nevada, Las Vegas (UNLV).

== Career ==
Araujo started working for Senator Harry Reid in 2007. He subsequently worked for the United Way of Southern Nevada.

Araujo has served as a member of the Nevada Assembly since 2015.

Araujo announced that he is seeking the office of Nevada Secretary of State in 2018. Araujo said in a statement he's running because he wants to ensure that Nevadans have a voting system "that protects the fundamental right of every eligible voter to have their vote counted, no matter who they are or what they believe." He very narrowly lost to incumbent Republican Barbara Cegavske by a margin of around 5,000 votes, or 0.56%.
