= Peggy Pierce =

American politician

Member of the Nevada Assembly from the 3rd district
- In office 2002–2013

Personal details
- Born: August 14, 1954 Milton, Massachusetts
- Died: October 10, 2013 (aged 59) Las Vegas, Nevada
- Party: Democratic
- Domestic partner: Jon Sasser

Margaret Comstock "Peggy" Pierce (August 14, 1954 - October 10, 2013) was an American politician.

Born in Milton, Massachusetts, on August 14, 1954, Pierce went to the City College of San Francisco and worked in community liaison/culinary union. She lived in Las Vegas, Nevada. Pierce served as Democratic member of the Nevada Assembly, from 2002 until 2013.

Pierce was diagnosed with cancer in 2003 and died from it in 2013.

== Personal life ==
Pierce was born in Milton, Massachusetts, the seventh of eight children and the daughter of an Episcopal priest active in the civil rights movement. She lived in San Francisco before venturing to Nevada in 1988 with dreams of becoming a professional singer.

She took food service and hotel jobs in Las Vegas and ascended the ranks of the union. She was elected to the Assembly in 2002 and represented a western Las Vegas district south of Summerlin while holding a job at the United Labor Agency of Nevada.

== Taxation ==
Pierce strongly believed in taxation to the mining industry. In 2011, she fought to remove 60 percent of the deductions a mining company can claim.

In a special session in 2010, Pierce was one of two lawmakers who broke ranks with the Democratic leadership saying that the state should raise taxes even in the depths of the recession. She also pushed for steep tax hikes on cigarettes and alcohol.

Pierce's fans gave her the nickname of "honey badger," thanks to her strong responses to tax cuts.

== Charity ==
Pierce coordinated a charity golf tournament that raised $100,000 for the Nevada Cancer Institute. She also coordinated the Helping Hands Project at the Culinary Workers Union to assist 16,000 workers who were laid off immediately after the September 11 attacks.

== Health ==
For the last ten years of her life, Pierce battled with Breast cancer. Steven Horsford praised her saying, "While she ultimately succumbed to that, I'll remember her coming to the floor having just had chemotherapy because she knew how important it was to represent her constituents".

It was her third bout of breast cancer that took her when her health rapidly declined in a week. She died at 59, on the 10th of October, 2013.
