= Ross Miller =

American attorney and politician

Member of the Clark County Commission from District C
- In office January 4, 2021 – January 6, 2025
- Preceded by: Larry Brown
- Succeeded by: April Becker

Secretary of State of Nevada
- In office January 3, 2007 – January 5, 2015
- Governor: Jim Gibbons; Brian Sandoval
- Preceded by: Dean Heller
- Succeeded by: Barbara Cegavske

Personal details
- Born: Ross James Miller; March 26, 1976 (age 50) Las Vegas Valley, Nevada, U.S.
- Party: Democratic
- Children: 3
- Relatives: Bob Miller (father)
- Education: Stanford University (BA); Loyola Marymount University (JD, MBA)

Ross James Miller (born March 26, 1976) is an American attorney and politician who served on the Clark County Commission from 2021 to 2025. A member of the Democratic Party, he served as the Nevada Secretary of State from 2007 to 2015.

Miller was the unsuccessful Democratic nominee for attorney general of Nevada in 2014. He was defeated by Republican Adam Laxalt by 46% to 45%.

== Early life and education ==
Miller was born on March 26, 1976, in Las Vegas, Nevada. He is one of three children of former Nevada Governor Bob Miller and his wife, Sandy Miller, the former First Lady of Nevada.

Miller earned his undergraduate degree at Stanford University, during which time he worked as an intern for President Bill Clinton. He later received dual advanced degrees in law and a master's in business administration from Loyola Marymount University. Miller became a deputy district attorney in Clark County, Nevada. His record as a prosecutor led John Walsh to appear in a campaign ad for him during his race for secretary of state.

== Political career ==
As secretary of state and Nevada's chief election officer in 2008, Miller led a voter registration investigation into the prominent anti-poverty organization, Association of Community Organizations for Reform Now (ACORN). The investigation led to a search warrant being executed at ACORN's Las Vegas headquarters and eventually led to the filing of 39 criminal counts against ACORN, its Las Vegas field director Christopher Edwards and its former deputy regional field director Amy Busefink. In August 2009, Christopher Edwards pleaded guilty to reduced charges and agreed to testify against ACORN and Busefink.

In 2008, Miller issued challenges to 21 term-limited incumbents who had filed for office in Nevada. They had been in office for at least 12 years, the limit specified in a 1996 state referendum. Miller's decision was the subject of a legal challenge which was ultimately unanimously upheld by the Nevada Supreme Court.

As head of Nevada's commercial recordings division, Miller touted the implementation of a Nevada business portal which would create a "one stop shop" for business transactions with the state. Services offered would range from getting or renewing annual business licenses to registering vehicle fleets to paying state taxes by entering data just once and paying for all the services. The new Web site would also function as a clearinghouse for all payments, which would first go to the Secretary of State's office and then be distributed to the cities and counties.

Miller chaired Nevada's census efforts in 2010. Due to his personal relationship with Ultimate Fighting Championship (UFC) president Dana White, Miller partnered with the UFC in a census awareness campaign which featured UFC personalities. Miller and White regularly train together in Mixed Martial Arts.

In 2009, Miller was selected as one of "24 Rising Stars" in American governance by the Aspen Institute and awarded the Rodel Fellowship in Public Leadership. The program is a two-year fellowship designed to break down partisan barriers and to enable officeholders to step back from their daily responsibilities to consider broader questions of good governance. In 2013, The Fix named Miller one of the top ten rising stars in politics. Miller was considered a potential candidate to run for attorney general in 2014, with an eye on eventually becoming Governor of Nevada.

=== Electoral results ===
Miller was first elected in 2006, defeating Republican Danny Tarkanian with 48.73% of the vote. In 2010, Miller defeated Republican Rob Lauer by a margin of 53.17% to 37.27%.

== Personal life ==
In 2012, Miller won his first sanctioned mixed martial arts fight and immediately retired from competition.

Political offices
Preceded by Dean Heller	Secretary of State of Nevada; 2007–2015	Succeeded by Barbara Cegavske
