= None of These Candidates =

Ballot option in Nevada elections

"None of These Candidates" is a voting option in Nevada for all statewide and presidential election ballots. This option is listed along with the names of individuals running for the position and is often described as "none of the above". The option first appeared on the Nevada ballot in 1975.

== Notable impact on elections ==
If the "None of These Candidates" option receives the most votes in an election, then the actual candidate who receives the most votes still wins the election. This has most notably happened on two occasions: in the 1976 Republican primary for Nevada's At-large congressional district, None of These Candidates received 16,097 votes, while Walden Earhart received 9,831 votes, followed by Dart Anthony with 8,097 votes. Even though he received fewer votes than "None of These Candidates", Earhart won the Republican nomination. He lost to incumbent Democratic Representative Jim Santini in the general election. In the 2014 Democratic gubernatorial primary, "None of These Candidates" received 30% of the popular vote, a plurality. Robert Goodman, the runner-up with 25% of the vote, was the Democratic nominee by state law.

According to a report by then-Secretary of State Dean Heller, "None of These Candidates" has finished first on three other occasions:

- a 1978 Republican congressional primary
- a 1978 Republican Secretary of State primary
- a 1986 Democratic Treasurer primary.

The "None of These Candidates" options has finished first on a few other occasions after Heller published his report:

- the 2014 Democratic gubernatorial primary.
- the 2024 Republican presidential primary in which Donald Trump did not appear on the primary ballot and ran in the caucuses instead.

The "None of These Candidates" option has possibly played a spoiler effect in close races, such as in the 1998 U.S. Senate election, in which Democratic incumbent Sen. Harry Reid defeated Republican challenger John Ensign by only 428 votes, while None of These Candidates drew 8,125 votes.

== Court challenge ==
In June 2012, anticipating a close race in Nevada during the 2012 presidential elections, the Republican National Committee challenged the constitutionality of the option. Fearing that the option would siphon votes from the Republican ticket, the RNC claimed that the option is not constitutional because if "None of these Candidates" received the most votes, it would not win the election. The Nevada Attorney General, on behalf of the Secretary of State of Nevada, argued that the option was a protest vote intended to send a message and whose outcome was no different from not voting at all. On August 22, U.S. District Court Judge Robert Jones agreed with the plaintiffs and struck down the law allowing the option as unconstitutional. He refused to issue a stay pending the outcome of an appeal, meaning the ban on this option was immediate.

On September 4, the United States Court of Appeals for the Ninth Circuit issued an emergency stay against the district court's order. The emergency stay barred the implementation of Judge Jones's injunction until the Ninth Circuit could hear an appeal, allowing the "none of these candidates" option to remain on the ballot in the November 2012 elections. On July 10, 2013, the Court of Appeals threw out the lawsuit, preserving the "none of these candidates" option. One member of that panel, Judge Stephen Reinhardt, criticized Jones' handling of the case: "His dilatory tactics appear to serve no purpose other than to seek to prevent the state from taking an appeal of his decision before it prints the ballots.... Such arrogance and assumption of power by one individual is not acceptable in our judicial system."

== General election results in presidential, senatorial, and gubernatorial elections ==
=== U.S. presidential elections results in Nevada ===
- 1976: 5,108 votes (2.53%)
- 1980: 4,193 votes (1.69%)
- 1984: 3,950 votes (1.38%)
- 1988: 6,934 votes (1.98%)
- 1992: 2,537 votes (0.50%)
- 1996: 5,608 votes (1.21%)
- 2000: 3,315 votes (0.54%)
- 2004: 3,668 votes (0.44%)
- 2008: 6,267 votes (0.65%)
- 2012: 5,770 votes (0.57%)
- 2016: 28,863 votes (2.56%) (Note: a little more than the margin of victory which was 27,202 votes)
- 2020: 14,079 votes (1.00%)
- 2024: 19,625 votes (1.32%) (Note: Values given are for the general election. During the Republican primary, the "None of These candidates" received more votes than any actual candidate. However, no delegates were awarded based on the primary. Delegates were awarded at the Republican caucuses in lieu.)

=== U.S. Senate elections ===
- 1976: 5,288 votes (2.62%)
- 1980: 3,163 votes (1.28%)
- 1982: 5,297 votes (2.20%) (Note: just under the margin of victory, which was 5,657 votes)
- 1986: 9,472 votes (3.62%)
- 1988: 7,242 votes (2.07%)
- 1992: 13,154 votes (2.65%)
- 1994: 12,626 votes (3.32%)
- 1998: 8,125 votes (1.86%) (Note: almost 19 times the margin of victory, which was 428 votes)
- 2000: 11,503 votes (1.92%)
- 2004: 12,968 votes (1.60%)
- 2006: 8,232 votes (1.41%)
- 2010: 16,197 votes (2.25%)
- 2012: 45,277 votes (4.54%) (Note: almost four times the margin of victory, which was 11,576 votes)
- 2016: 42,257 votes (3.81%) (Note: about 57% higher than the margin of victory, which was 26,915 votes)
- 2018: 15,303 votes (1.57%)
- 2022: 12,441 votes (1.22%) (Note: about 57% higher than the margin of victory, which was 7,928 votes)
- 2024: 44,380 votes (3.03%) (Note: about 84% higher than the margin of victory, which was 24,059 votes)

=== Gubernatorial elections ===
- 1978: 3,218 votes (1.67%)
- 1982: 6,894 votes (2.87%)
- 1986: 5,471 votes (2.10%)
- 1990: 9,017 votes (2.81%)
- 1994: 8,785 votes (2.31%)
- 1998: 12,641 votes (2.92%)
- 2002: 23,674 votes (4.70%)
- 2006: 20,699 votes (3.56%) (Note: a little under the margin of victory, which was 23,319 votes)
- 2010: 12,231 votes (1.71%)
- 2014: 15,751 votes (2.88%) (Note: Values given are for the general election. During the Democratic primary, the "None of These candidates" received more votes than any actual candidate. Since only actual candidates can win, Bob Goodman, the candidate with the most votes, won the primary and advanced to the general election.)
- 2018: 18,865 votes (1.94%)
- 2022: 14,866 votes (1.46%) (Note: just under the margin of victory, which was 15,386 votes)
