= Nevada State Treasurer =

State agency in Nevada, United States

State Treasurer of Nevada
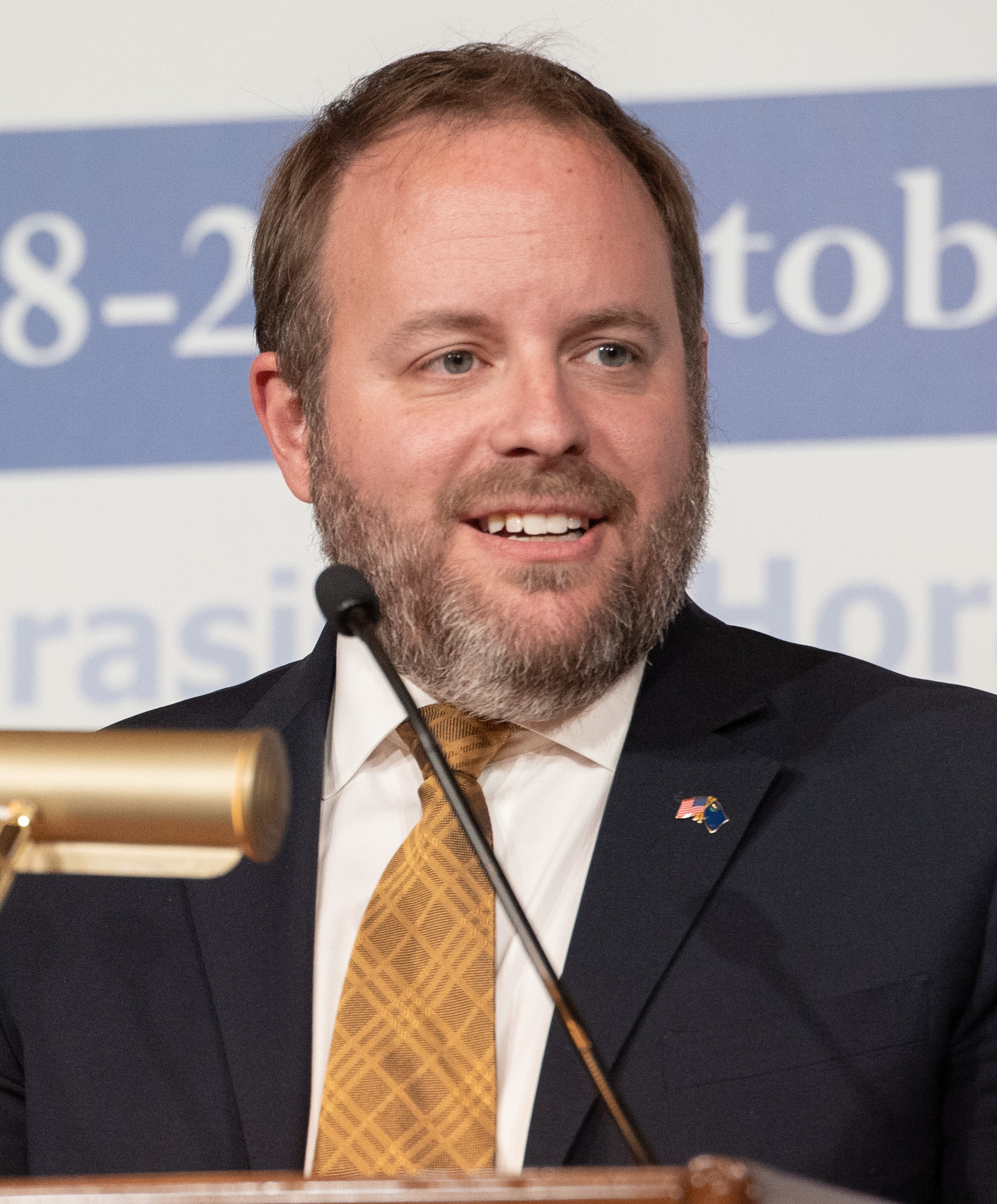
- Incumbent; Zach Conine since 2019
- Type: State Treasurer
- Member of: State Board of Finance
- Seat: Carson City, Nevada
- Term length: Four years, two term limit
- Formation: 1864
- First holder: Eben Rhodes
- Website: Nevada State Treasurer

The Nevada state treasurer is an independent constitutional officer in the executive branch of government of the U.S. state of Nevada. The State Treasurer's Office is based in Carson City, Nevada. Twenty-three individuals have occupied the office of treasurer since statehood. The incumbent is Zach Conine, a Democrat. He was first elected in the 2018 election and is currently serving his second term in office.

== Election and term of office ==
The state treasurer is elected to a four-year term and may serve for eight years or two terms under Nevada's constitutionally mandated lifetime term limits.

== Powers and duties ==
The state treasurer is the chief banker and investment officer for state government. As such, the State Treasurer's Office manages the state's cash flows and investments, issues and services the state debt, and administers Nevada's unclaimed property laws. The State Treasurer's Office also facilitates tax-advantaged savings programs for future college students and individuals with disabilities.

In addition to functional responsibilities, the state treasurer chairs the Board of Finance and is a member of the Executive Branch Audit Committee. The former authorizes the issuance of debt and establishes investment policies for the state's investment portfolio. The latter oversees the state's internal audit function.

== List of state treasurers ==
Democratic (8) Republican (13) Silver (2)

#	Image	State Treasurers	Party	Term start	Term end
1		Eben Rhodes	Republican	1864	1869
2		Christopher C. Batterman	Republican	1869	1871
3		Jerry Schooling	Democratic	1871	1879
4		Lyman L. Crockett	Republican	1879	1883
5		George Tufly	Republican	1883	1890
6		George W. Richard	Republican	1890	1891
7		John F. Egan	Republican	1891	1894
8		George W. Richard	Republican	1894	1895
9		William J. Westerfield	Silver	1895	1899
10		David M. Ryan	Silver–Democratic	1899	1911
11		William McMillan	Republican	1911	1915
12		Edward C. "Ed" Malley	Democratic	1915	1927
13		George B. Russell	Republican	1927	1935
14		Dan W. Franks	Democratic	1935	1963
15		Michael Mirabelli	Democratic	1963	1979
16		Stanton Colton	Democratic	1979	1983
17		Patricia Dillon Cafferata	Republican	1983	1987
18		Kenneth F. Santor	Republican	1987	1991
19		Bob Seale	Republican	1991	1999
20		Brian Krolicki	Republican	1999	2007
21		Kate Marshall	Democratic	2007	2015
22		Dan Schwartz	Republican	2015	2019
23		Zach Conine	Democratic	2019	Present
