= Nevada Attorney General =

Chief legal officer for the U.S. state of Nevada

Attorney General of Nevada
- Seal of the Attorney General

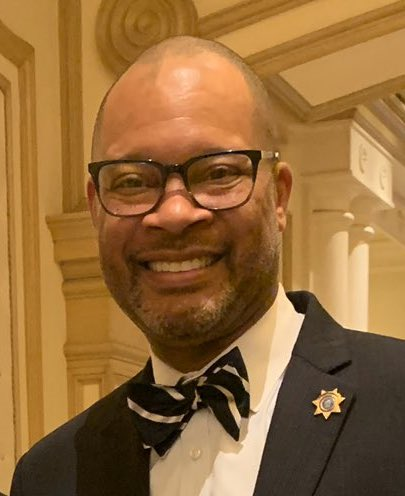
- Incumbent; Aaron Ford since January 7, 2019
- Style: The Honorable
- Term length: Four years, two term limit
- Inaugural holder: George A. Nourse; 1864
- Formation: Constitution of Nevada
- Website: Office of the Attorney General

The Nevada Attorney General is the chief legal officer for the U.S. state of Nevada. The functions of the office are set forth in Nevada Revised Statutes, Chapter 228. The attorney general represents the people of Nevada in civil and criminal matters before trial, appellate and the supreme courts of Nevada and the United States. The attorney general also serves as legal counsel to state officers and, with few exceptions, to state agencies, boards and commissions.

The attorney general may also work with or help district attorneys, local law enforcement, and federal and international criminal justice agencies in the administration of justice. In addition, the attorney general establishes and operates projects and programs to protect Nevadans from fraud or illegal activities that target consumers or threaten public safety, and enforces laws that safeguard the environment and natural resources. Under the state Constitution, the attorney general is elected to a four-year term. To meet its statutory obligations the office is divided into the following : Bureau of Consumer Protection, Criminal Justice, Governmental Affairs, and Public Affairs

The current attorney general of Nevada is Aaron Ford, a member of the Democratic Party. As of August 2026, Ford is ineligible to run for reelection as attorney general because of term limits and is instead his party's nominee for the 2026 gubernatorial election.

== Officeholders ==
Attorneys General by party affiliation
Party	Attorneys General
Democratic	19
Republican	11
Silver	4

#	Image	Name	Term of service	Political party
1		George A. Nourse	1864–1867	Republican
2		Robert M. Clarke	1867–1871	Republican
3		Luther A. Buckner	1871–1875	Democratic
4		John R. Kittrell	1875–1879	Democratic
5		Michael A. Murphy	1879–1883	Republican
6		William H. Davenport	1883–1887	Republican
7		John F. Alexander	1887–1891	Republican
8		James D. Torreyson	1891–1895	Republican
9		Robert M. Beatty	1895–1896	Silver
10		James R. Judge	1896–1899	Silver
11		William D. Jones	1899–1901	Silver
12		William Woodburn	1901–1903	Silver
13		James G. Sweeney	1903–1907	Democratic (Note: Officially listed as a Democrat, but was elected as a Silver-Democrat.)
14		Richard C. Stoddard	1907–1911	Democratic
15		Cleveland H. Baker	1911–1912	Democratic
16		George B. Thatcher	1912–1919	Democratic
17		Leonard B. Fowler	1919–1923	Democratic
18		Michael A. Diskin	1923–1931	Democratic
19		Gray Mashburn	1931–1943	Democratic
20		Alan Bible	1943–1951	Democratic
21		William T. Mathews	1951–1955	Democratic
22		Harvey Dickerson	1955–1959	Democratic
23		Roger D. Foley	1959–1962	Democratic
24		Charles E. Springer	1962–1963	Democratic
25		Harvey Dickerson	1963–1971	Democratic
26		Robert List	1971–1979	Republican
27		Richard Bryan	1979–1983	Democratic
28		Brian McKay	1983–1991	Republican
29		Frankie Sue Del Papa	1991–2003	Democratic
30		Brian Sandoval	2003–2005	Republican
31		George Chanos	2005–2007	Republican
32		Catherine Cortez Masto	2007–2015	Democratic
33		Adam Laxalt	2015–2019	Republican
34		Aaron Ford	2019–present	Democratic

== See also ==
- Government of Nevada
- Constitution of Nevada
- Nevada's five other executive officers: governor, lieutenant governor, attorney general, secretary of state, and treasurer
- State attorneys general (United States)
- Law enforcement in the United States
