= Secretary of State of Nevada =

Nevada public office

- Seal of Nevada

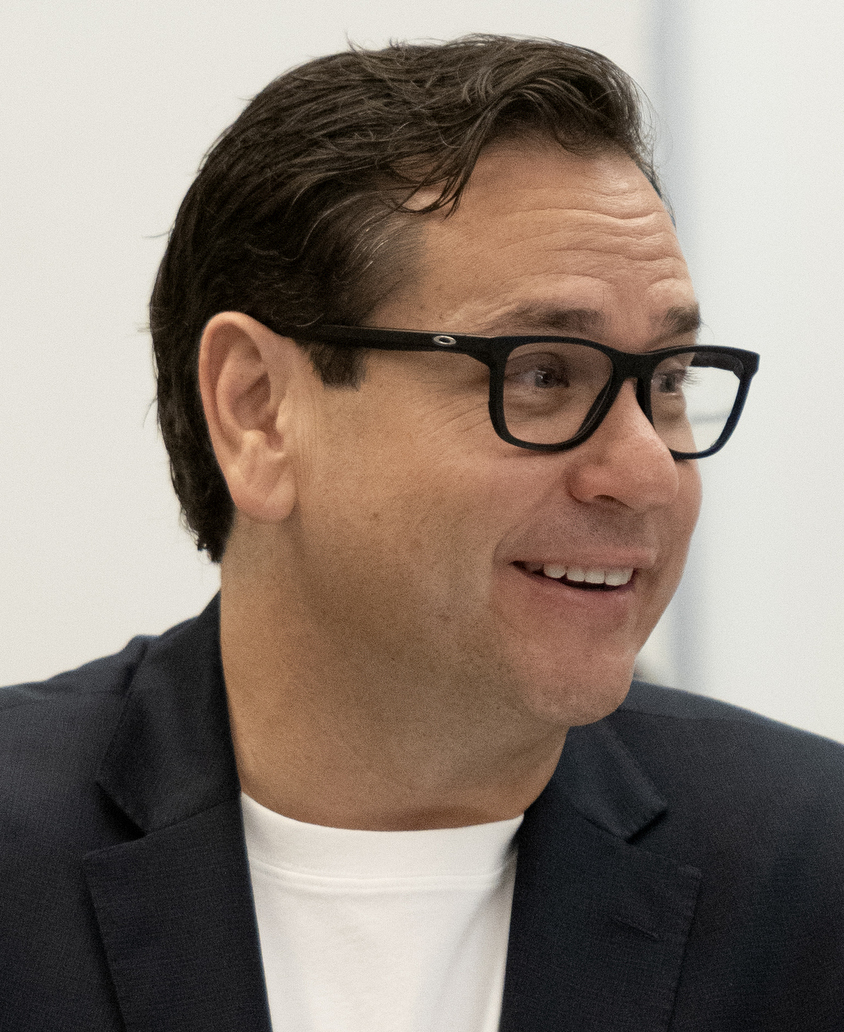
- Incumbent; Cisco Aguilar since January 2, 2023
- Term length: Four years, two term limit
- Constituting instrument: Constitution of Nevada
- Inaugural holder: Chauncey N. Noteware 1864
- Succession: Fourth
- Website: www.nvsos.gov/sos

The secretary of state of Nevada is the chief clerk for the U.S. state of Nevada and is one of the state-wide elected offices mandated by Nevada Constitution. As the chief clerk, the secretary of state is the official record-keeper for the state and responsible for business registrations, supervising elections, and officiating documents.

The current secretary of state is Cisco Aguilar, a member of the Democratic Party who was first elected in 2022. Aguilar was preceded by Barbara Cegavske, a Republican, who served as secretary of state from 2015 to 2023.

== Organization ==
The Nevada Secretary of State's Office is composed of eight divisions:

- The Commercial Recordings Division registers businesses and keeps their documentation up to date. This division also registers trade names, trademarks, service marks, rights of publicity, and filings pursuant to the Uniform Commercial Code.
- A combined division is responsible for the Document Preparation Services Program, Domestic Partnership Registry, and Nevada Lockbox program. The Document Preparation Services Program registers document preparers and investigates potential violations of state law requiring their registration. The Domestic Partnership Registry "files and maintains all domestic partnership registrations and terminations" in accordance with Nevada's domestic partnership law that was passed in 2009. The Nevada Lockbox program is a secure electronic registry for important legal documents such as advance directive and guardianship nominations.
- The Elections Division certifies candidates, registers and files candidate contribution and expenditure peports, certifies ballot questions, supervises elections, and reports and certifies the results of state primary and general elections. The division also administers the state's Confidential Address Program for victims of domestic violence.
- The Executive Administration Division provides leadership and support to the entire office.
- A division operates the Nevada Business Portal, an online portal to assist paperwork required to operate a business.
- The Notary Division is responsible for appointing, training, and disciplining the notaries public within the state of Nevada. The Division is also charged with administering the state's digital signature laws and with notarizing apostilles.
- The Operations Division of the secretary of state’s office manages important internal functions of the office including accounting, budget and information technology. This division is responsible for the office’s $20 million budget and more than $100 million in annual revenues realized by the office. The IT component oversees the development and maintenance of the electronic Secretary of State (eSoS) application, statewide voter database, the agency’s website and other important applications and tools.
- The Securities Division is charged with the regulation of the state's securities industry. The division licenses individuals who sell securities, registers securities offerings, and enforces the civil and criminal provisions of the state's securities laws. The Securities Division also is tasked with licensing sports agents, pursuant to the Athletes Agent Act of 2001.

== Other duties ==
The secretary of state acts as the official record-keeper of the state of Nevada. The secretary also maintains the official bond of the state treasurer, and serves on the State Board of Prison Commissioners, the State Board of Examiners, the Tahoe Regional Planning Agency Governing Board, the State Records Committee, the State Advisory Committee on Participatory Democracy and the Executive Branch Audit Committee.

== Additional ==
In 2004, under the leadership of then Secretary of State Dean Heller, Nevada became the first state in the nation to implement an auditable paper trail to electronic voting machines.

== List of secretaries of state ==
=== Secretaries of state of the Territory of Nevada ===
Territorial secretaries of state by party affiliation
Party	Secretaries of state
Republican	1

#	Image	Name	Term of service	Political party
1		Orion Clemens	1861–1864	Republican

=== Secretaries of state of the State of Nevada ===
Secretaries of state by party affiliation
Party	Secretaries of state
Republican	9
Democratic	8
Silver	1

#	Image	Name	Term of service	Political party
1		Chauncey N. Noteware	1864–1871	Republican
2		James D. Minor	1871–1879	Republican
3		Jasper Babcock	1879–1883	Republican
4		John M. Dormer	1883–1891	Republican
5		Oscar H. Grey	1891–1895	Republican
6		Eugene Howell	1895–1903	Silver
7		William Gibb Douglass	1903–1911	Republican
8		George Brodigan	1911–1923	Democratic
9		William G. Greathouse	1923–1937	Democratic
10		Malcolm McEachin	1937–1947	Democratic
11		John Koontz	1947–1973	Democratic
12		William D. Swackhamer	1973–1987	Democratic
13		Frankie Sue Del Papa	1987–1991	Democratic
14		Cheryl Lau	1991–1995	Republican
15		Dean Heller	1995–2007	Republican
16		Ross Miller	2007–2015	Democratic
17		Barbara Cegavske	2015–2023	Republican
18		Cisco Aguilar	2023–present	Democratic

== See also ==
- Government of Nevada
