= 2022 Nevada Senate election =

- November 8, 2022

11 of 21 seats in the Nevada Senate 11 seats needed for a majority
	Majority party	Minority party
Leader	Nicole Cannizzaro	James Settelmeyer (term-limited)
Party	Democratic	Republican
Leader's seat	6th - Las Vegas	17th - Gardnerville
Seats before	12	9
Seats won	7	4
Seats after	13	8
Seat change	▲1	▼1
Popular vote	201,014	305,964
Percentage	39.41%	59.99%
Swing	▼16.75%	▲19.02%
- Democratic gain Democratic hold Republican hold No election 50–60% 60–70% 60–70% >90%
Majority Leader before election
Nicole Cannizzaro
Democratic
Elected Majority Leader
Nicole Cannizzaro
Democratic

The 2022 Nevada Senate election was held on Tuesday, November 8, 2022. Voters in 11 districts of the Nevada Senate elected their senators. The elections coincided with elections for other offices, including for governor, the U.S. Senate, the U.S. House and the Nevada Assembly. The primary elections were held on Tuesday, June 14, 2022.

Democrats gained one seat, increasing their majority to 13 out of 21 seats, one seat shy of a two-thirds supermajority.

== Background ==
In the 2020 Nevada State Senate election, Democrats maintained control of the Nevada Senate by a 12–9 margin. Democrats have controlled the chamber since 2016.

== Predictions ==
Source	Ranking	As of
Sabato's Crystal Ball	Lean D	May 19, 2022

== Results summary ==
- For districts not displayed, there was no election until 2024.

State Senate district	Incumbent	Party	Elected Senator	Party
2nd	Mo Denis†	Dem	Edgar Flores	Dem
8th	Marilyn Dondero Loop	Dem	Marilyn Dondero Loop	Dem
9th	Melanie Scheible	Dem	Melanie Scheible	Dem
10th	Fabian Doñate	Dem	Fabian Doñate	Dem
12th	Keith Pickard† (Note: Redistricted from the 20th district.)	Rep	Julie Pazina	Dem
13th	Julia Ratti†	Dem	Skip Daly	Dem
14th	Ira Hansen	Rep	Ira Hansen	Rep
16th	Don Tatro	Rep	Lisa Krasner	Rep
17th	James Settelmeyer†	Rep	Robin Titus	Rep
20th	Joe Hardy† (Note: Redistricted from the 12th district.)	Rep	Jeff Stone	Rep
21st	James Ohrenschall	Dem	James Ohrenschall	Dem

† - Incumbent not seeking re-election

=== Overview ===
Summary of the November 8, 2022 Nevada Senate election results
Party	Candidates	Votes	%	Seats				
Party	Candidates	Votes	%	Before	Up	Won	After	+/–
Democratic	9	201,014	39.41	12	6	7	13	▲1
Republican	11	305,964	59.99	9	5	4	8	▼1
Libertarian	2	3,064	0.60	0	0	0	0	Steady
Total		510,042	100.00	21	11	11	21	Steady

=== Close races ===
Seats where the margin of victory was under 10%:

1. State Senate district 8, 1.44%
2. State Senate district 12, 4.94% (gain)
3. State Senate district 9, 6.9%

== Detailed results ==
=== District 2 ===
Incumbent Democrat Mo Denis had represented the 2nd district since 2010. Denis was term-limited, and fellow Democrat Edgar Flores won the open seat.

Nevada Senate 2nd District general election, 2022
Party	Candidate	Votes	%
Democratic	Edgar Flores	12,442	69.93%
Republican	Leo Henderson	5,350	30.07%
Total votes		17,792	100%
Democratic hold			

=== District 8 ===
Incumbent Democrat Marilyn Dondero Loop had represented the 8th district since 2018.

Nevada Senate 8th District general election, 2022
Party	Candidate	Votes	%
Democratic	Marilyn Dondero Loop (incumbent)	26,698	50.72%
Republican	Joey Paulos	25,944	49.28%
Total votes		52,642	100%
Democratic hold			

=== District 9 ===
Incumbent Democrat Melanie Scheible had represented the 9th district since 2018.

Nevada Senate 9th District general election, 2022
Party	Candidate	Votes	%
Democratic	Melanie Scheible (incumbent)	22,823	53.45%
Republican	Tina Brown	19,875	46.55%
Total votes		42,698	100%
Democratic hold			

=== District 10 ===
Incumbent Democrat Fabian Doñate had represented the 10th district since his appointment in February 2021, following Yvanna Cancela's resignation. Doñate was elected to a full term.

Nevada Senate 10th District general election, 2022
Party	Candidate	Votes	%
Democratic	Fabian Doñate (incumbent)	16,714	55.54%
Republican	Philip Graviet	12,284	40.82%
Libertarian	Chris Cunningham	1,096	3.64%
Total votes		30,094	100%
Democratic hold			

=== District 12 ===
The new 12th district includes the home of incumbent Republican Keith Pickard, who had represented the 20th district since 2018, Pickard did not seek re-election, and Democrat Julie Pazina won the open seat.

Nevada Senate 12th District general election, 2022
Party	Candidate	Votes	%
Democratic	Julie Pazina	26,609	52.47%
Republican	Cheryln Arrington	24,104	47.53%
Total votes		50,713	100%
Democratic gain from Republican			

=== District 13 ===
Incumbent Democrat Julia Ratti had represented the 13th district since 2016, but resigned in November 2021. Democrat Skip Daly won the open seat.

Nevada Senate 13th District general election, 2022
Party	Candidate	Votes	%
Democratic	Skip Daly	23,416	61.57%
Republican	Matthew Buehler	14,618	38.43%
Total votes		38,034	100%
Democratic hold			

=== District 14 ===
Incumbent Republican Ira Hansen had represented the 14th district since 2018.

Nevada Senate 14th District general election, 2022
Party	Candidate	Votes	%
Republican	Ira Hansen (incumbent)	47,925	100%
Total votes		47,925	100%
Republican hold			

=== District 16 ===
Incumbent Republican Don Tatro had represented the 16th district since his appointment in 2021, following Ben Kieckhefer's resignation. Tatro lost re-nomination to fellow Republican Lisa Krasner, who went on to win the general election.

Nevada Senate 16th District general election, 2022
Party	Candidate	Votes	%
Republican	Lisa Krasner	42,871	60.35%
Democratic	Aaron Sims	28,172	39.65%
Total votes		71,043	100%
Republican hold			

=== District 17 ===
Incumbent Republican and Minority Leader James Settelmeyer had represented the 17th district since 2010. Settelmeyer was term-limited, and State Assembly Minority Leader Robin Titus was unopposed for the open seat.

Nevada Senate 17th District general election, 2022
Party	Candidate	Votes	%
Republican	Robin Titus	53,823	100%
Total votes		53,823	100%
Republican hold			

=== District 20 ===
The new 20th district includes the home of incumbent Republican Joe Hardy, who had represented the 12th district since 2010. Hardy was term-limited, and fellow Republican Jeff Stone won the open seat.

Nevada Senate 20th District general election, 2022
Party	Candidate	Votes	%
Republican	Jeff Stone	44,567	61.69%
Democratic	Brent Foutz	25,712	35.59%
Libertarian	Brandon Mills	1,968	2.72%
Total votes		72,247	100%
Republican hold			

=== District 21 ===
Incumbent Democrat James Ohrenschall had represented the 21st district since 2018.

Nevada Senate 21st District general election, 2022
Party	Candidate	Votes	%
Democratic	James Ohrenschall (incumbent)	18,428	55.79%
Republican	April Larsen	14,603	44.21%
Total votes		33,031	100%
Democratic hold			

== See also ==
- 2022 Nevada elections
- List of Nevada state legislatures
