= 2018 United States Senate election in Nevada =

- November 6, 2018
- Turnout: 62.26% ▲
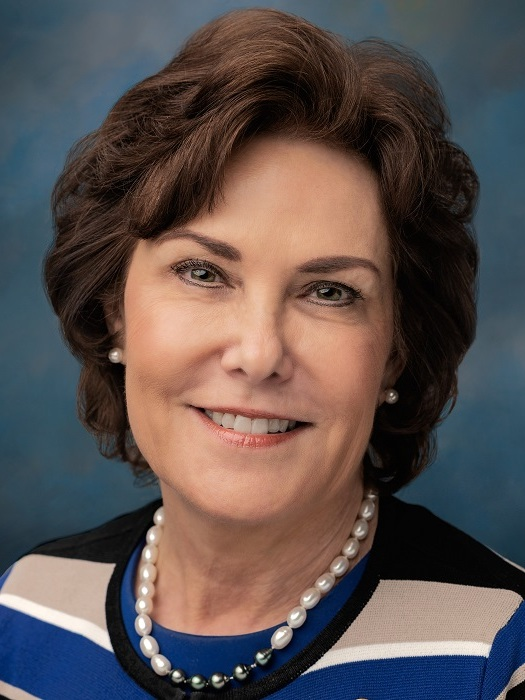

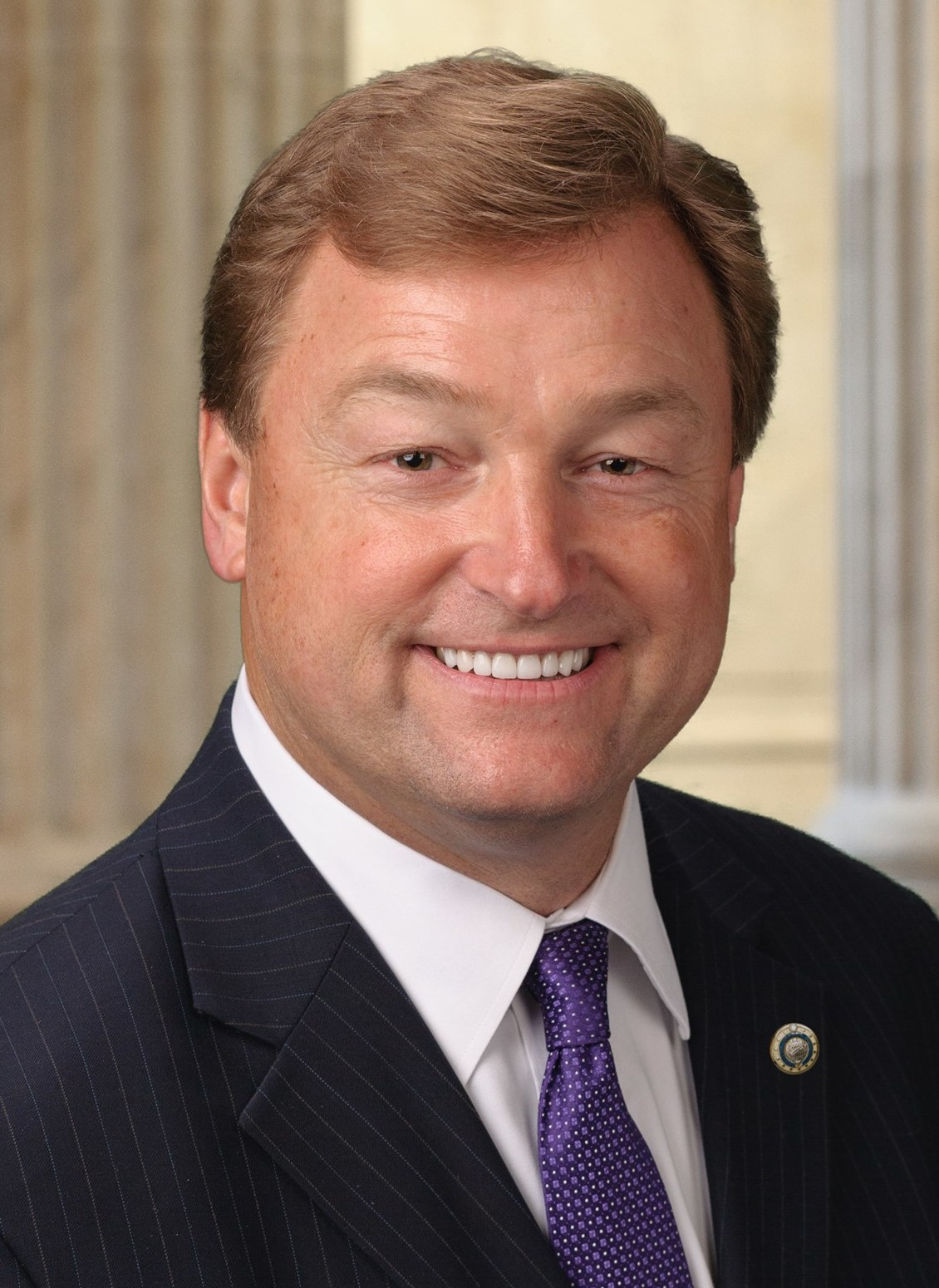
Nominee	Jacky Rosen	Dean Heller
Party	Democratic	Republican
Popular vote	490,071	441,202
Percentage	50.41%	45.38%
- Rosen: 40–50% 50–60% 60–70% 70–80% 80–90% >90% Heller: 40–50% 50–60% 60–70% 70–80% 80–90% >90%
U.S. senator before election
Dean Heller
Republican
Elected U.S. Senator
Jacky Rosen
Democratic

The 2018 United States Senate election in Nevada took place November 6, 2018, to elect one of two U.S. senators from Nevada. Incumbent Republican Senator Dean Heller lost re-election to a second full term, being defeated by Democratic nominee Jacky Rosen.

Heller had considered a bid for Nevada governor, but instead announced he would run for reelection to a second full term. This was the only Republican-held U.S. Senate seat up for election in 2018 in a state Hillary Clinton won in the 2016 presidential election, and one of two Democratic flips in the 2018 U.S. Senate elections. Rosen's victory marked the first time that Nevada had been represented by two women in the United States Senate, and the first time a Democrat had won the Class 1 Senate seat in Nevada since 1994 (as well as the first time both Senate seats were held by Democrats since 2001). Heller was the only Republican incumbent to lose a Senate seat in 2018; he later unsuccessfully ran in the 2022 Republican primary for governor of Nevada.

The candidate filing deadline was March 16, 2018, and the primary election was held on June 12.

== Background ==
Nevada is a swing state that once leaned slightly rightward, having voted for George W. Bush twice. Since 2008, it has seen the opposite trend, giving Barack Obama a seven-point victory in 2012 while simultaneously electing Heller to the Senate by one point. Obama also carried Nevada in 2008 by a 12.5% margin. In 2016, the state shifted rightward again, still voting for Hillary Clinton, but only by two points, although Democrat Catherine Cortez Masto managed to win the seat of retiring Democratic Senate leader Harry Reid. Because of the consistent swing nature of the state, many cited Heller as the most vulnerable incumbent Republican in the U.S. Senate up for reelection in 2018, a year with few Republicans in that position; President Donald Trump even warned that if Heller failed to vote to pass the GOP Health care bill to repeal and replace the Affordable Care Act, he could well lose his seat in the next election.

At the end of September 2018, the Brett Kavanaugh Supreme Court nomination became a major element of the campaign. Heller made noncommittal remarks and a significant campaign was deployed to criticize his support for Kavanaugh.

Rosen is only the 37th sitting House freshman to win a Senate election, the first female representative to do so, and the first one-term House Democrat to become a senator-elect since James Abourezk in 1972.

== Republican primary ==
=== Candidates ===
==== Declared ====
- Sherry Brooks
- Sarah Gazala, teacher
- Vic Harrell
- Tom Heck
- Dean Heller, incumbent U.S. senator

==== Withdrew ====
- Danny Tarkanian, businessman, former attorney and perennial candidate (ran for U.S. House)

==== Declined ====
- Mark Amodei, U.S. representative (ran for re-election)

=== Endorsements ===
Dean Heller

Federal officials

- Mike Pence, 48th vice president of the United States (2017–2021)
- Donald Trump, 45th president of the United States (2017–2021)

U.S. senators

- Susan Collins, U.S. senator from Maine (1997–present)
- David Perdue, U.S. senator from Georgia (2015–2021)

U.S. representatives

- Cresent Hardy, U.S. representative from Nevada's 4th congressional district (2015–2017)
- Joe Heck, U.S. representative from Nevada's 3rd congressional district (2011–2017) and nominee for U.S. Senate in 2016

Governors

- Brian Sandoval, 29th governor of Nevada (2011–2019)

State officials

- Becky Harris, chairwoman of the Nevada Gaming Control Board (2018–2019)
- Mark Hutchison, 34th lieutenant governor of Nevada (2015–2019)
- Brian Krolicki, 33rd lieutenant governor of Nevada (2007–2015)

State senators

- Heidi Gansert, state senator from the 15th district (2016–present)
- Pete Goicoechea, state senator from the 19th district (2013–present)
- Joe Hardy, state senator from the 12th district (2010–present)
- Ben Kieckhefer, state senator from the 16th district (2010–2021)
- Michael Roberson, state senator from the 20th district (2011–2018)
- James Settelmeyer, state senator from the 17th district (2010–present)

State assembly members

- Chris Edwards, state assemblyman from the 19th district (2014–2020)
- John Hambrick, state assemblyman from the 2nd district (2008–2020)
- Al Kramer, state assemblyman from the 40th district (2016–2020)
- Lisa Krasner, state assemblywoman from the 26th district (2016–present)
- Keith Pickard, state assemblyman from the 22nd district (2016–2020)
- Robin Titus, state assemblywoman from the 38th district (2014–present)
- Jill Tolles, state assemblywoman from the 25th district (2016–present)
- Jim Wheeler, Nevada Assembly minority leader (2017–2019), state assemblyman from the 39th district (2013–present)
- Melissa Woodbury, state assemblywoman from the 23rd district (2008–2018)

Local officials

- Marsha Berkbigler, Washoe County commissioner
- Charlene Bybee, Sparks city councilwoman
- Demar Dahl, Elko County commissioner
- Vaughn Hartung, Washoe County commissioner
- Bob Lucey, Washoe County commissioner
- Barry Penzel, Douglas County commissioner
- Bruce L. Woodbury, Clark County commissioner (1981–2009)

Individuals

- Stephen Cloobeck, businessman and major Democratic Party donor
- Peter Guzman, president of the Latin Chamber of Commerce
- Steve Wynn, Wynn Resorts Ltd. CEO and Republican National Committee finance chairman

Groups

- Laborers Union Local 872
- National Federation of Independent Business
- National Right to Life
- Nevada Republican Party
- Nevada Law Enforcement Coalition
- NRA Political Victory Fund
Danny Tarkanian (withdrew)

Federal officials

- Steve Bannon, senior counselor to the president (2017) and executive chairperson of Breitbart News

Governors

- Sarah Palin, 9th governor of Alaska (2006–2009), Republican nominee for vice president of the United States in 2008

=== Polling ===
Hypothetical polling

with Danny Tarkanian

Poll source	Date(s) administered	Sample size	Margin of error	Dean Heller	Danny Tarkanian	Undecided
JMC Analytics	October 24–26, 2017	500	± 4.4%	38%	44%	17%
JMC Analytics	August 24–25, 2017	700	± 3.7%	31%	39%	31%
The Tarrance Group (R-Heller)	August 14–16, 2017	300	± 5.8%	55%	33%	12%

=== Results ===
Results by county: Map legend: Heller—70–80%; Heller—60–70%; Heller—50–60%

Republican primary results
Party	Candidate	Votes	%
Republican	Dean Heller (incumbent)	99,509	69.97%
Republican	Tom Heck	26,296	18.49%
Republican	None of These Candidates	5,978	4.20%
Republican	Sherry Brooks	5,145	3.62%
Republican	Sarah Gazala	4,011	2.82%
Republican	Vic Harrell	1,282	0.90%
Total votes		142,221	100.00%

== Democratic primary ==
=== Candidates ===
==== Declared ====
- Danny Burleigh
- David Drew Knight
- Sujeet "Bobby" Mahendra, businessman and candidate for the U.S. Senate in 2016
- Allen Rheinhart, Black Lives Matter activist and candidate for the U.S. Senate in 2016
- Jacky Rosen, U.S. representative for NV-03
- Jesse Sbaih, attorney and candidate for NV-03 in 2016

==== Declined ====
- Stephen Cloobeck, businessman (endorsed Heller)
- Aaron Ford, majority leader of the Nevada Senate (ran for attorney general)
- Steven Horsford, former U.S. representative (ran for U.S. House)
- Ruben Kihuen, U.S. representative (endorsed Rosen)
- Kate Marshall, former state treasurer, nominee for secretary of state in 2014 and nominee for NV-02 in 2011 (ran for lieutenant governor)
- Rory Reid, former chairman of the Clark County Commission, nominee for governor in 2010 and son of former U.S. Senator Harry Reid
- Dina Titus, U.S. representative and nominee for governor in 2006 (ran for re-election)
- Steve Wolfson, Clark County district attorney (ran for re-election)

=== Endorsements ===
Jacky Rosen

Federal officials

- Barack Obama, 44th president of the United States (2009–2017)

U.S. senators

- Kamala Harris, U.S. senator from California (2017–2021)
- Maggie Hassan, U.S. senator from New Hampshire (2017–present)
- Catherine Cortez Masto, U.S. senator from Nevada (2017–present)
- Jeff Merkley, U.S. senator from Oregon (2009–present)
- Patty Murray, U.S. senator from Washington (1993–present)
- Harry Reid, Senate majority leader (2007–2015), U.S. senator from Nevada (1987–2017)
- Chris Van Hollen, U.S. senator from Maryland (2017–present)
- Elizabeth Warren, U.S. senator from Massachusetts (2013–present)

U.S. representatives

- Ruben Kihuen, U.S. representative from Nevada's 4th congressional district (2017–2019)
- Kyrsten Sinema, U.S. representative from Arizona's 9th congressional district (2013–2019), nominee for U.S. Senate in Arizona in 2018

Labor unions

- International Brotherhood of Teamsters Joint Council 42
- National Education Association
- Nevada State AFL-CIO
- Nevada State Education Association
- Service Employees International Union Nevada Local 1107

Organizations

- Council for a Livable World
- Democratic Senatorial Campaign Committee
- EMILY's List
- End Citizens United
- Human Rights Campaign
- League of Conservation Voters Action Fund
- NARAL Pro-Choice America
- National Organization for Women
- Natural Resources Defense Council
- Planned Parenthood Action Fund
- Sierra Club Toiyabe Chapter

Websites and newspapers

- Daily Kos

=== Results ===
Results by county: Map legend: Rosen—80–90%; Rosen—70–80%; Rosen—60–70%; Rosen—50–60%; Rosen—30–40%; Rosen/Knight tie—<30%

Democratic primary results
Party	Candidate	Votes	%
Democratic	Jacky Rosen	110,567	77.11%
Democratic	None of These Candidates	10,078	7.03%
Democratic	David Knight	6,346	4.43%
Democratic	Allen Rheinhart	4,782	3.33%
Democratic	Jesse Sbaih	4,540	3.17%
Democratic	Bobby Mahendra	3,835	2.67%
Democratic	Danny Burleigh	3,244	2.26%
Total votes		143,392	100.00%

== Independents ==
=== Candidates ===
==== Declared ====
- Kamau Bakari
- Barry Michaels, businessman, convicted felon and perennial candidate

== General election ==
=== Debates ===
- Complete video of debate, October 19, 2018

=== Predictions ===
Source	Ranking	As of
The Cook Political Report	Tossup	October 26, 2018
Inside Elections	Tilt D (flip)	November 1, 2018
Sabato's Crystal Ball	Lean D (flip)	November 5, 2018
CNN	Tossup	October 30, 2018
RealClearPolitics	Tossup	November 5, 2018
Daily Kos	Tossup	October 26, 2018
Fox News	Tossup	October 30, 2018
FiveThirtyEight	Tossup	November 6, 2018

=== Endorsements ===
Jacky Rosen (D)

Federal officials

- Joe Biden, 47th vice president of the United States (2009–2017), U.S. senator from Delaware (1973–2009)
- Barack Obama, 44th president of the United States (2009–2017), U.S. senator from Illinois (2005–2008)

U.S. senators

- Cory Booker, U.S. senator from New Jersey (2013–present)
- Dick Durbin, Senate minority whip (2015–2021), U.S. senator from Illinois (1997–present) and former U.S. representative from Illinois's 20th congressional district (1983–1997)
- Kirsten Gillibrand, U.S. senator from New York (2009–present) and former U.S. representative from New York's 20th congressional district (2007–2009)
- Kamala Harris, U.S. senator from California (2017–2021), former California attorney general (2011–2017)
- Maggie Hassan, U.S. senator from New Hampshire (2017–present) and former governor of New Hampshire (2013–2017)
- Mazie Hirono, U.S. senator from Hawaii (2013–present) and former U.S. representative from Hawaii's 2nd congressional district (2007–2013)
- Catherine Cortez Masto, U.S. senator from Nevada (2017–present) and former Nevada attorney general (2007–2015)
- Jeff Merkley, U.S. senator from Oregon (2009–present)
- Patty Murray, U.S. senator from Washington (1993–present)
- Harry Reid, Senate majority leader (2007–2015), U.S. senator from Nevada (1987–2017)
- Bernie Sanders, U.S. senator from Vermont (2007–present) and former U.S. representative from Vermont's at-large congressional district (1991–2007) (Independent)
- Brian Schatz, U.S. senator from Hawaii (2012–present) and former lieutenant governor of Hawaii (2010–2012)
- Chris Van Hollen, U.S. senator from Maryland (2017–present) and former U.S. representative from Maryland's 8th congressional district (2003–2017)
- Elizabeth Warren, U.S. senator from Massachusetts (2013–present)

U.S. representatives

- Ruben Kihuen, U.S. representative from Nevada's 4th congressional district (2017–2019)
- Terri Sewell, U.S. representative from Alabama's 7th congressional district (2011–present)
- Kyrsten Sinema, U.S. representative from Arizona's 9th congressional district (2013–2019), nominee for U.S. Senate in Arizona in 2018

Individuals

- Brandon Flowers, singer
- Jimmy Kimmel, talk show host
- Cecile Richards, activist
- Adam Rippon, figure skater
- Amy Schumer, actress
- Amy Siskind, activist and writer

Labor unions

- International Brotherhood of Teamsters Joint Council 42
- National Education Association
- Nevada State AFL-CIO
- Nevada State Education Association
- Service Employees International Union Nevada Local 1107
- United Automobile Workers

Organizations

- Alliance for Retired Americans
- Council for a Livable World
- Democratic Senatorial Campaign Committee
- EMILY's List
- End Citizens United
- Feminist Majority Political Action Committee
- Human Rights Campaign
- League of Conservation Voters Action Fund
- NARAL Pro-Choice America
- National Organization for Women
- Natural Resources Defense Council
- Planned Parenthood Action Fund
- Population Connection
- Rachel's Action Network
- Sierra Club Toiyabe Chapter

Websites and newspapers

- Daily Kos
Dean Heller (R)

Federal officials

- Mike Pence, 48th vice president of the United States (2017–2021), former governor of Indiana (2013–2017) and former U.S. representative from Indiana's 6th congressional district (2003–2013) and 2nd district (2001–2003)
- Donald Trump, 45th president of the United States (2017–2021)

U.S. senators

- John Boozman, U.S. senator from Arkansas (2011–present) and former U.S. representative from Arkansas's 3rd congressional district (2001–2011)
- Susan Collins, U.S. senator from Maine (1997–present)
- Cory Gardner, U.S. senator from Colorado (2015–2021) and former U.S. representative from Colorado's 4th congressional district (2011–2015)
- Lindsey Graham, U.S. senator from South Carolina (2003–2026) and former U.S. representative from South Carolina's 3rd congressional district (1995–2003)
- David Perdue, U.S. senator from Georgia (2015–2021)
- Thom Tillis, U.S. senator from North Carolina (2015–present)

Governors

- Brian Sandoval, 29th governor of Nevada (2011–2019)

State officials

- Becky Harris, chairwoman of the Nevada Gaming Control Board (2018–2019)
- Mark Hutchison, 34th lieutenant governor of Nevada (2015–2019)
- Brian Krolicki, 33rd lieutenant governor of Nevada (2007–2015)

State senators

- Heidi Gansert, state senator from the 15th district (2016–2024)
- Pete Goicoechea, state senator from the 19th district (2013–present)
- Joe Hardy, state senator from the 12th district (2010–present)
- Ben Kieckhefer, state senator from the 16th district (2010–2021)
- Michael Roberson, state senator from the 20th district (2011–2018)
- James Settelmeyer, state senator from the 17th district (2010–present)

State assembly members

- Chris Edwards, state assemblyman from the 19th district (2014–2020)
- John Hambrick, state assemblyman from the 2nd district (2008–2020)
- Al Kramer, state assemblyman from the 40th district (2016–2020)
- Lisa Krasner, state assemblywoman from the 26th district (2016–present)
- Keith Pickard, state assemblyman from the 22nd district (2016–2020)
- Robin Titus, state assemblywoman from the 38th district (2014–present)
- Jill Tolles, state assemblywoman from the 25th district (2016–present)
- Jim Wheeler, Nevada Assembly minority leader (2017–2019), state assemblyman from the 39th district (2013–present)
- Melissa Woodbury, state assemblywoman from the 23rd district (2008–2018)

Local officials

- Marsha Berkbigler, Washoe County commissioner
- Charlene Bybee, Sparks City councilwoman
- Demar Dahl, Elko County commissioner
- Vaughn Hartung, Washoe County commissioner
- Bob Lucey, Washoe County commissioner
- Barry Penzel, Douglas County commissioner
- Bruce L. Woodbury, Clark County commissioner (1981–2009)

Individuals

- Stephen Cloobeck, businessman and major Democratic Party donor
- Peter Guzman, president of the Latin Chamber of Commerce
- Donald Trump Jr., businessman and son of U.S. President Donald Trump
- Steve Wynn, Wynn Resorts Ltd. CEO and Republican National Committee finance chairman

Organizations

- Laborers Union Local 872
- National Federation of Independent Business
- National Right to Life
- Nevada Law Enforcement Coalition
- Nevada Republican Party
- NRA Political Victory Fund

Newspapers

- Las Vegas Review-Journal

=== Fundraising ===
Campaign finance reports as of October 17, 2018
Candidate (party)	Total receipts	Total disbursements	Cash on hand
Dean Heller (R) Incumbent	$14,525,094	$12,538,859	$2,211,457
Jacky Rosen (D)	$21,571,221	$20,817,629	$768,851
Source: Federal Election Commission

=== Polling ===
View source data.

Poll source	Date(s) administered	Sample size	Margin of error	Dean Heller (R)	Jacky Rosen (D)	Tim Hagan (L)	None of these	Other	Undecided
HarrisX	November 3–5, 2018	600	± 4.0%	45%	47%	–	–	–	–
HarrisX	November 2–4, 2018	600	± 4.0%	46%	46%	–	–	–	–
Emerson College	November 1–4, 2018	1,197	± 3.0%	45%	49%	–	–	3%	4%
HarrisX	November 1–3, 2018	600	± 4.0%	46%	45%	–	–	–	–
HarrisX	October 31 – November 2, 2018	600	± 4.0%	45%	44%	–	–	–	–
HarrisX	October 30 – November 1, 2018	600	± 4.0%	46%	43%	–	–	–	–
Trafalgar Group (R)	October 29 – November 1, 2018	2,587	± 1.9%	49%	46%	–	–	2%	3%
HarrisX	October 29–31, 2018	600	± 4.0%	45%	45%	–	–	–	–
HarrisX	October 24–30, 2018	1,400	± 2.6%	43%	46%	–	–	–	–
CNN/SSRS	October 24–29, 2018	622 LV	± 4.8%	45%	48%	2%	4%	0%	1%
CNN/SSRS	October 24–29, 2018	807 RV	± 4.2%	41%	44%	4%	8%	0%	3%
Gravis Marketing	October 24–26, 2018	773	± 3.5%	45%	47%	–	–	–	7%
Ipsos	October 12–19, 2018	1,137	± 3.0%	47%	41%	–	–	8%	4%
Public Policy Polling (D-Protect Our Care)	October 15–16, 2018	648	± 3.9%	46%	48%	–	–	–	7%
Vox Populi Polling	October 13–15, 2018	614	± 3.7%	49%	51%	–	–	–	–
Emerson College	October 10–12, 2018	625	± 4.2%	48%	41%	–	–	3%	8%
NYT Upshot/Siena College	October 8–10, 2018	642	± 4.0%	47%	45%	–	–	1%	7%
NBC News/Marist	September 30 – October 3, 2018	574 LV	± 5.5%	44%	42%	8%	2%	<1%	4%
NBC News/Marist	September 30 – October 3, 2018	574 LV	± 5.5%	46%	44%	–	5%	1%	4%
NBC News/Marist	September 30 – October 3, 2018	780 RV	± 4.5%	42%	41%	8%	3%	<1%	6%
NBC News/Marist	September 30 – October 3, 2018	780 RV	± 4.5%	45%	43%	–	6%	1%	6%
Kaiser Family Foundation/SSRS	September 19 – October 2, 2018	513	± 5.0%	45%	44%	–	–	4%	7%
CNN/SSRS	September 25–29, 2018	693 LV	± 4.6%	43%	47%	4%	5%	0%	1%
CNN/SSRS	September 25–29, 2018	851 RV	± 4.1%	40%	43%	5%	10%	0%	2%
Ipsos	September 7–17, 2018	1,039	± 4.0%	46%	43%	–	–	4%	8%
Gravis Marketing	September 11–12, 2018	700	± 3.7%	45%	47%	–	–	–	8%
Suffolk University (Note: Archived December 18, 2018, at the Wayback Machine)	September 5–10, 2018	500	± 4.4%	41%	42%	2%	2%	4%	9%
Public Policy Polling (D-Protect Our Care)	August 20–21, 2018	528	± 4.3%	43%	48%	–	–	–	–
Suffolk University	July 24–29, 2018	500	± 4.4%	41%	40%	2%	5%	3%	9%
SurveyMonkey/Axios	June 11 – July 2, 2018	1,097	± 5.5%	45%	48%	–	–	–	7%
Gravis Marketing	June 23–26, 2018	630	± 3.9%	41%	45%	–	–	–	14%
Public Policy Polling (D-Health Care Voter)	April 30 – May 1, 2018	637	± 3.9%	42%	44%	–	–	–	14%
SurveyMonkey/Axios	April 2–23, 2018	1,332	± 5.0%	44%	50%	–	–	–	6%
The Mellman Group	April 12–19, 2018	600	± 4.0%	40%	39%	–	–	–	21%
Public Policy Polling (D-Protect Our Care)	March 15–17, 2018	720	± 3.7%	39%	44%	–	–	–	17%
Public Policy Polling	June 23–25, 2017	648	± 3.9%	41%	42%	–	–	–	17%

Hypothetical polling

Poll source	Date(s) administered	Sample size	Margin of error	Dean Heller (R)	Generic Democrat	Undecided
Public Policy Polling (D-Our Lives on the Line)	July 26–27, 2017	847	± 3.6%	31%	50%	18%
Public Policy Polling (D-Save My Care)	June 13–14, 2017	706	± 3.4%	39%	46%	14%

Poll source	Date(s) administered	Sample size	Margin of error	Generic Republican	Generic Democrat	Undecided
Public Policy Polling (D-Protect Our Care)	March 15–17, 2018	720	± 3.7%	41%	47%	12%

with Dina Titus

Poll source	Date(s) administered	Sample size	Margin of error	Dean Heller (R)	Dina Titus (D)	Undecided
Anzalone Liszt Grove Research	June 23–29, 2017	600	± 4.0%	47%	45%	8%

=== Results ===
Heller carried 15 of Nevada's 17 county-level jurisdictions, but Rosen carried the two largest, Clark (home to Las Vegas) and Washoe (home to Reno). She won Clark County by over 92,000 votes, almost double her statewide margin of over 48,900 votes.

United States Senate election in Nevada, 2018
Party	Candidate	Votes	%	±%
Democratic	Jacky Rosen	490,071	50.41%	+5.70%
Republican	Dean Heller (incumbent)	441,202	45.38%	−0.49%
None of These Candidates		15,303	1.57%	-2.97%
Independent	Barry Michaels	9,269	0.95%	N/A
Libertarian	Tim Hagan	9,196	0.95%	N/A
Independent American	Kamau Bakari	7,091	0.73%	−4.16%
Total votes		972,132	100.00%	N/A
Democratic gain from Republican				

==== By county ====
County	Jacky Rosen Democratic		Dean Heller Republican		None of These Candidates		Barry Michaels Independent		Tim Hagan Libertarian		Kamau Bakari IAPN		Margin		Total votes
County	#	%	#	%	#	%	#	%	#	%	#	%	#	%	Total votes
Carson City	9,321	41.07	12,328	54.32	372	1.64	250	1.10	254	1.12	169	0.74	-3,007	-13.25	22,694
Churchill	1,999	20.80	7,042	73.26	218	2.27	145	1.51	116	1.21	92	0.96	-5,042	-52.47	9,612
Clark	359,028	55.06	266,675	40.90	9,810	1.50	5,922	0.91	5,823	0.89	4,786	0.73	92,353	14.16	652,044
Douglas	8,303	31.86	16,742	64.25	388	1.49	224	0.86	266	1.02	134	0.51	-8,439	-32.39	26,057
Elko	2,904	19.14	11,491	75.73	260	1.71	172	1.13	205	1.35	142	0.94	-8,587	-56.59	15,174
Esmeralda	52	14.02	280	75.47	17	4.58	9	2.43	10	2.70	3	0.81	-228	-61.46	371
Eureka	74	9.76	633	83.51	22	2.90	13	1.72	9	1.19	7	0.92	-559	-73.75	758
Humboldt	1,188	21.41	4,022	72.48	139	2.50	78	1.41	71	1.28	51	0.92	-2,834	-51.07	5,549
Lander	350	16.72	1,588	75.87	64	3.06	30	1.43	36	1.72	25	1.19	-1,238	-59.15	2,093
Lincoln	283	14.51	1,547	79.33	62	3.18	27	1.38	21	1.08	10	0.51	-1,264	-64.82	1,950
Lyon	5,526	26.41	14,296	68.32	406	1.94	282	1.35	257	1.23	157	0.75	-8,770	-41.91	20,924
Mineral	570	31.49	1,056	58.34	90	4.97	40	2.21	37	2.04	17	0.94	-486	-26.85	1,810
Nye	4,888	27.93	11,397	65.11	435	2.49	278	1.59	284	1.62	221	1.26	-6,509	-37.19	17,503
Pershing	398	22.56	1,271	72.05	39	2.21	26	1.47	19	1.08	11	0.62	-873	-49.49	1,764
Storey	724	30.68	1,495	63.35	51	2.16	32	1.36	32	1.36	26	1.10	-771	-32.67	2,360
Washoe	93,828	49.85	86,988	46.21	2,829	1.50	1,682	0.89	1,716	0.91	1,184	0.63	6,840	3.63	188,227
White Pine	635	19.59	2,351	72.52	101	3.12	59	1.82	40	1.23	56	1.73	-1,716	-52.93	3,242
Totals	490,071	50.41	441,202	45.38	15,303	1.57	9,269	0.95	9,196	0.95	7,091	0.73	48,869	5.03	972,132

Counties that flipped from Republican to Democratic

- Washoe (largest municipality: Reno)

==== By congressional district ====
Rosen won three of four congressional districts.

District	Rosen	Heller	Representative
1st	64%	32%	Dina Titus
2nd	43%	53%	Mark Amodei
3rd	50%	46%	Susie Lee
4th	51%	44%	Steven Horsford

== See also ==
- 2018 United States Senate elections
