= 2022 United States Senate election in Nevada =

- November 8, 2022
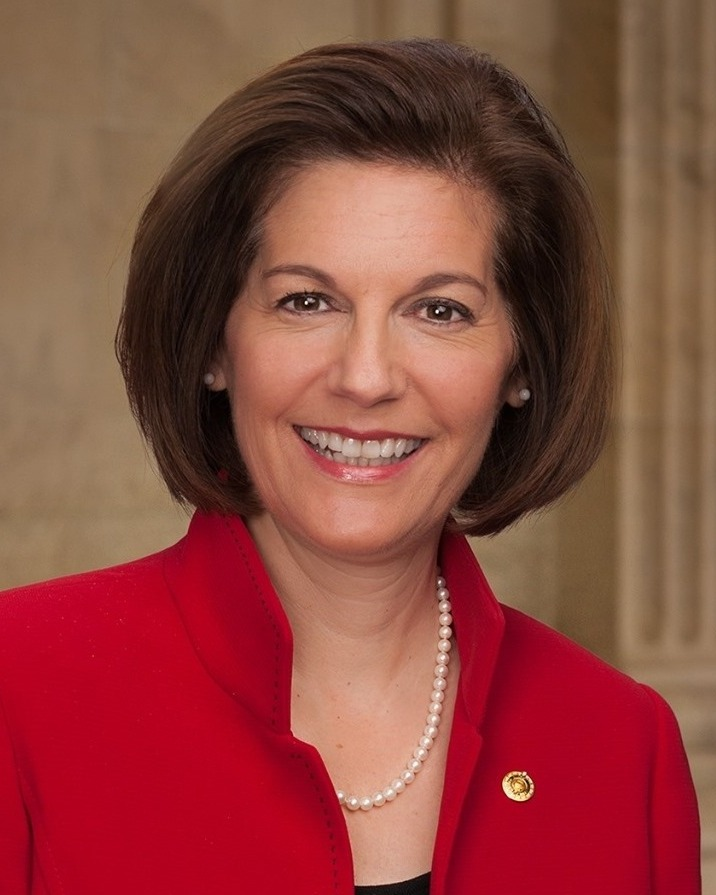

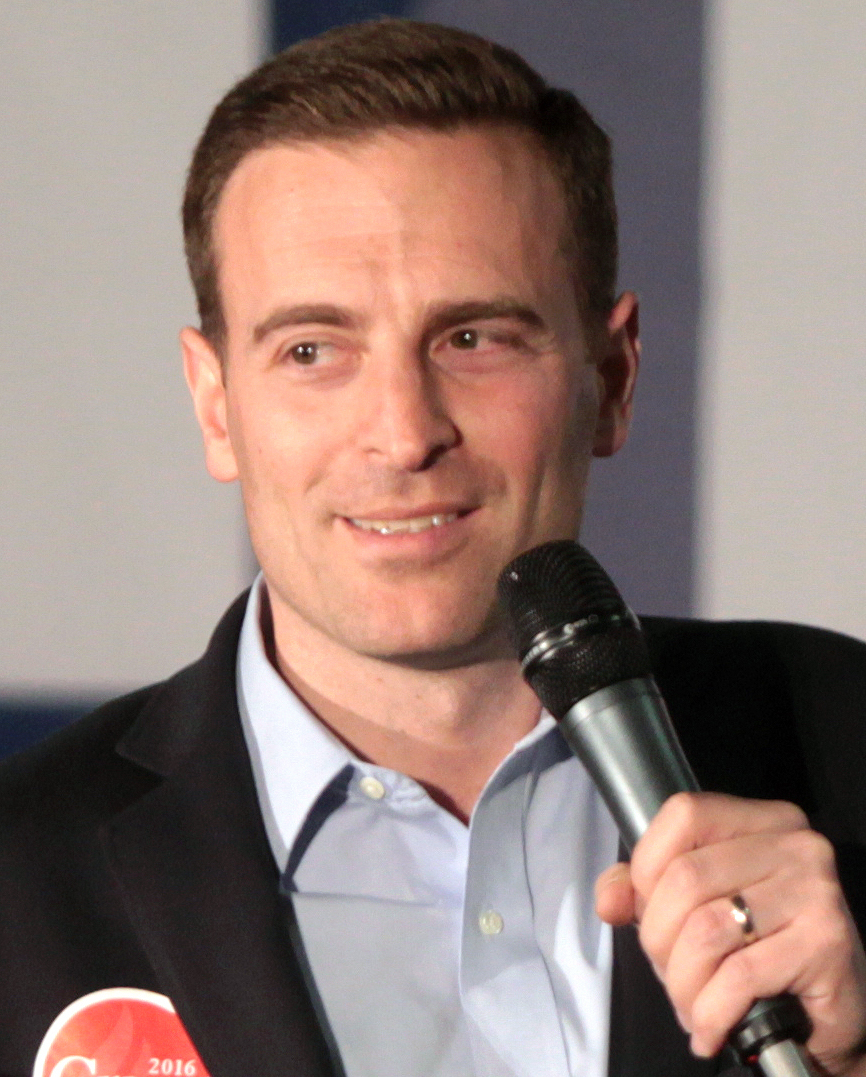
Nominee	Catherine Cortez Masto	Adam Laxalt
Party	Democratic	Republican
Popular vote	498,316	490,388
Percentage	48.81%	48.04%
- Cortez Masto: 40–50% 50–60% 60–70% 70–80% 80–90% >90% Laxalt: 40–50% 50–60% 60–70% 70–80% 80–90% >90% Tie: 40–50% 50% No votes
U.S. senator before election
Catherine Cortez Masto
Democratic
Elected U.S. senator
Catherine Cortez Masto
Democratic

The 2022 United States Senate election in Nevada was held on November 8, 2022, to elect a member of the United States Senate to represent the state of Nevada. Democratic incumbent Catherine Cortez Masto won re-election to a second term, defeating Republican former state attorney general Adam Laxalt. Nevada's election results were slowed due to state law that allowed voters to submit mail-in ballots until November 12, and allowed voters to fix clerical problems in their mail-in ballots until November 14, 2022.

Cortez Masto made protecting abortion rights a central issue of her campaign. Many experts and forecasters saw Nevada as Republicans' best chance to pickup a seat in the Senate. Despite Laxalt leading in most polls, Cortez Masto narrowly won re-election by a little less than 8,000 votes.

Cortez Masto flipped Washoe County, improving her 2016 voteshare by 1.7%, although Laxalt improved on Joe Heck's margin in rural counties, and performed slightly better in Clark County. The incumbent Democrat's improvements in Washoe compared to 2016 proved to be decisive, as her victory margin there was slightly larger than in Nevada as a whole. With a narrow margin of 0.78%, this was the closest Senate race of the 2022 election cycle and the closest Senate election in Nevada since 1998.

== Democratic primary ==
=== Candidates ===
==== Nominee ====
- Catherine Cortez Masto, incumbent U.S. senator (2017–present) and former attorney general of Nevada (2007–2015)

==== Eliminated in primary ====
- Stephanie Kasheta
- Corey Reid
- Allen Rheinhart, Black Lives Matter activist and candidate for governor in 2014, U.S. Senate in 2016, and Nevada's 1st congressional district in 2020

=== Endorsements ===
Catherine Cortez Masto

Organizations

- AAPI Victory Fund
- American Israel Public Affairs Committee
- EMILY's List
- End Citizens United
- Feminist Majority PAC
- Humane Society of the United States Legislative Fund
- Jewish Dems
- Latino Victory
- League of Conservation Voters
- Let America Vote
- NARAL Pro-Choice America
- National Wildlife Federation
- Natural Resources Defense Council
- Planned Parenthood Action Fund
- Population Connection Action Fund
- Pro-Israel America
- Sierra Club
- Women's Political Committee

Newspapers

- Las Vegas Sun

Labor unions

- Culinary Workers Union
- International Alliance of Theatrical Stage Employees local 720
- Nevada AFL–CIO
- Operative Plasterers' and Cement Masons' International Association
- United Auto Workers

=== Results ===
Results by county: Cortez Masto: 60–70%; 70–80%; 80–90%; 90–100%

Democratic primary results
Party	Candidate	Votes	%
Democratic	Catherine Cortez Masto (incumbent)	159,694	90.87%
Democratic	Corey Reid	4,491	2.56%
None of These Candidates		4,216	2.40%
Democratic	Allen Rheinhart	3,852	2.19%
Democratic	Stephanie Kasheta	3,487	1.98%
Total votes		175,740	100.0%

== Republican primary ==
=== Candidates ===
==== Nominee ====
- Adam Laxalt, former attorney general of Nevada (2015–2019), nominee for governor in 2018, son of former U.S. Senator Pete Domenici and grandson of former U.S. Senator Paul Laxalt

==== Eliminated in primary ====
- Sam Brown, U.S. Army veteran, Purple Heart recipient, candidate for Texas's 102nd House of Representatives district in 2014, and great-grandson of Paul Brown
- William "Bill" Conrad, retired combat veteran
- Bill Hockstedler, vice president of Ambient Clinical Analytics, sheriff's office volunteer, and U.S. Air Force veteran
- Sharelle Mendenhall, pageant queen
- Tyler Perkins
- Carlo Poliak, retired sanitation worker and perennial candidate
- Paul Rodriguez

==== Declined ====
- Mark Amodei, U.S. representative for Nevada's 2nd congressional district (2011–present) (ran for re-election)
- Heidi Gansert, state senator for the 15th district (2016–2024)
- Dean Heller, former U.S. senator (2011–2019) and former U.S. representative for Nevada's 2nd congressional district (2007–2011) (ran for governor)
- Ben Kieckhefer, state senator for the 16th district (2010–2021)
- Brian Sandoval, president of the University of Nevada, Reno (2020–present) and former governor of Nevada (2011–2019)

=== Debates ===
2022 United States Senate Republican primary election in Nevada debates (Note: Minor candidates that didn't participate in any of the debates are omitted.)
No.	Date	Organizer	Location	Key: P Participant A Absent N Non-invitee I Invitee W Withdrawn					Source
No.	Date	Organizer	Location	Sam Brown	Bill Conrad	Bill Hockstedler	Adam Laxalt	Sharellen Mendenhall	Source
1	April 7, 2022	Redmove Nevada	Atlantis Casino Resort Spa, Reno	A	P	P	A	P	
2	May 9, 2022	Nevada Newsmakers	Nevada Newsmakers Studio, Reno	P	N	N	P	N	

=== Endorsements ===
Sam Brown (eliminated in primary)

Organizations

- Nevada Republican Party
Adam Laxalt

Executive branch officials

- Michael Flynn, former U.S. National Security Advisor (2017) and former Director of the Defense Intelligence Agency (2012–2014) (Democratic)
- Mike Pompeo, 70th U.S. secretary of state (2018–2021)
- Donald Trump, 45th president of the United States (2017–2021)

U.S. senators

- Marsha Blackburn, U.S. senator from Tennessee (2019–present)
- Tom Cotton, U.S. senator from Arkansas (2015–present)
- Ted Cruz, U.S. senator from Texas (2013–present)
- Josh Hawley, U.S. senator from Missouri (2019–present)
- Mitch McConnell, U.S. senator from Kentucky (1985–present) and Senate minority leader (2021–2025)
- Rick Scott, U.S. senator from Florida (2019–present) and former governor of Florida (2011–2019)

Statewide officials

- Ron DeSantis, governor of Florida (2019–present)

Individuals

- Mark Levin, lawyer and author
- Matt Schlapp, chairman of the American Conservative Union
- Donald Trump Jr., businessman and political activist

Organizations

- 60 Plus Association
- American Conservative Union
- Club for Growth
- FreedomWorks for America
- Gun Owners of America
- Political Victory Fund
- Republican Jewish Coalition
- Senate Conservatives Fund

Labor unions

- Las Vegas Peace Officers Association
- National Association of Police Organizations
- Nevada Fraternal Order of Police
- Public Safety Alliance of Nevada

=== Polling ===
View source data.

Source of poll aggregation	Dates administered	Dates updated	Sam Brown	Bill Hockstedler	Adam Laxalt	Sharelle Mendenhall	Other (Note: Calculated by taking the difference of 100% and all other candidates combined.)	Margin
Real Clear Politics	April 25 – June 7, 2022	June 10, 2022	30.3%	1.0%	51.3%	3.0%	24.4%	Laxalt +21.0

Poll source	Date(s) administered	Sample size (Note: Key: A – all adults RV – registered voters LV – likely voters V – unclear)	Margin of error	Sam Brown	Bill Hockstedler	Adam Laxalt	Sharelle Mendenhall	None of These Candidates	Other	Undecided
OH Predictive Insights	June 6–7, 2022	525 (LV)	± 4.4%	34%	1%	48%	3%	2%	3% (Note: Conrad, Perkins, and Rodriguez with 1%)	9%
University of Nevada Reno	May 17–27, 2022	368 (LV)	± 5.9%	31%	5%	57%	7%	–	–	–
OH Predictive Insights	May 10–12, 2022	500 (LV)	± 4.4%	30%	0%	45%	3%	8%	2% (Note: Conrad and Rodriguez with 1%; Perkins and Poliak with 0%)	11%
Emerson College	April 30 – May 2, 2022	1,000 (LV)	± 3.0%	27%	1%	50%	4%	–	3% (Note: Conrad, Perkins, Pollak, and Rodriguez with 1%)	15%
The Trafalgar Group (R)	April 25–28, 2022	1,071 (LV)	± 3.0%	26%	1%	50%	3%	–	5%	15%
WPA Intelligence (R) (Note: Poll sponsored by Laxalt's campaign)	April 24–26, 2022	503 (LV)	± 4.4%	20%	1%	57%	1%	9%	–	12%
WPA Intelligence (R) (Note: This poll was sponsored by Club for Growth Action, which supports Laxalt)	March 13–15, 2022	500 (LV)	± 4.4%	19%	1%	57%	1%	–	3%	15%
OH Predictive Insights	January 19–26, 2022	230 (RV)	± 6.5%	14%	–	37%	–	–	–	49%

Hypothetical polling

Poll source	Date(s) administered	Sample size	Margin of error	Dean Heller	Adam Laxalt	Other	Undecided
WPA Intelligence (R)	December 9–11, 2020	300 (LV)	± 5.7%	25%	44%	6%	25%

=== Results ===
Results by county: Laxalt: 40–50%; 50–60%; 60–70%; Brown: 40–50%

Republican primary results
Party	Candidate	Votes	%
Republican	Adam Laxalt	127,757	55.91%
Republican	Sam Brown	78,206	34.23%
Republican	Sharelle Mendenhall	6,946	3.04%
None of These Candidates		6,277	2.75%
Republican	William "Bill" Conrad	3,440	1.51%
Republican	William "Bill" Hockstedler	2,836	1.24%
Republican	Paul Rodriguez	1,844	0.81%
Republican	Tyler Perkins	850	0.37%
Republican	Carlo Poliak	332	0.15%
Total votes		228,488	100.0%

== Libertarian primary ==
=== Candidates ===
==== Declared ====
- Neil Scott, accountant

== Independent American primary ==
=== Candidates ===
==== Declared ====
- Barry Rubinson, nominee for Nevada's 4th congressional district in 2020

== Independents ==
=== Candidates ===
==== Declared ====
- Barry Lindemann, asset manager

==== Not on ballot ====
- J. J. Destin, truck driver
- Gretchen Rae Lowe

== General election ==
=== Predictions ===
Source	Ranking	As of
The Cook Political Report	Tossup	March 4, 2022
Inside Elections	Tossup	February 24, 2022
Sabato's Crystal Ball	Lean D	November 7, 2022
Politico	Tossup	April 1, 2022
RCP	Tossup	November 1, 2022
Fox News	Tossup	May 12, 2022
DDHQ	Tossup	August 22, 2022
538	Tossup	September 22, 2022
The Economist	Lean R (flip)	November 6, 2022

=== Endorsements ===
Catherine Cortez Masto (D)

U.S. presidents

- Bill Clinton, 42nd president of the United States (1993–2001)
- Barack Obama, 44th president of the United States (2009–2017)

Executive branch officials

- Pete Buttigieg, United States Secretary of Transportation (2021–2025)

U.S. senators

- Tammy Baldwin, U.S. senator from Wisconsin (2013–present)
- Cory Booker, U.S. senator from New Jersey (2013–present)
- Bob Casey Jr., U.S. senator from Pennsylvania (2007–2025)
- Amy Klobuchar, U.S. senator from Minnesota (2007–present)
- Chris Murphy, U.S. senator for Connecticut (2013–present)
- Jon Ossoff, U.S. senator from Georgia (2021–present)
- Jacky Rosen, U.S. senator from Nevada (2019–present)
- Bernie Sanders, U.S. senator from Vermont (2007–present) (Independent)
- Brian Schatz, U.S. senator from Hawaii (2012–present)
- Debbie Stabenow, U.S. senator from Michigan (2001–2025)
- Elizabeth Warren, U.S. senator from Massachusetts (2013–present)

State legislators

- Pete Ernaut, state assemblyman (1993–1997) and advisor for governors Kenny Guinn and Brian Sandoval (Republican)

Local officials

- Carl Erquiaga, former Churchill County commissioner (Republican)
- Di An Putnam, mayor of Winnemucca, Nevada (Republican)
- Nathan Robertson, mayor of Ely, Nevada (Republican)
- Jason Soto, chief of police, Reno, Nevada (Republican)

Individuals

- Cher, singer and actress
- Jimmy Kimmel, talk show host
- John Legend, singer
- Martin Sheen, actor
- Oprah Winfrey, businesswoman and talk show host

Organizations

- AAPI Victory Fund
- American Israel Public Affairs Committee
- EMILY's List
- End Citizens United
- Feminist Majority PAC
- Human Rights Campaign
- Humane Society of the United States Legislative Fund
- Jewish Dems
- Latino Victory
- League of Conservation Voters
- Let America Vote
- NARAL Pro-Choice America
- National Wildlife Federation
- Natural Resources Defense Council
- Planned Parenthood Action Fund
- Population Connection Action Fund
- Pro-Israel America
- Sierra Club
- Silver State Equality
- Women's Political Committee

Newspapers

- Las Vegas Sun

Labor unions

- Culinary Workers Union
- International Alliance of Theatrical Stage Employees local 720
- National Education Association
- Nevada AFL–CIO
- Nevada Association of Public Safety Officers (NAPSO)
- Nevada Law Enforcement Coalition (NLEC)
- Operative Plasterers' and Cement Masons' International Association
- United Auto Workers
- United Mine Workers
Adam Laxalt (R)

U.S. presidents

- Donald Trump, 45th president of the United States (2017–2021)

Executive branch officials

- Michael Flynn, former U.S. National Security Advisor (2017) and former director of the Defense Intelligence Agency (2012–2014) (Democratic)
- Richard Grenell, special presidential envoy for Serbia and Kosovo Peace Negotiations (2019–2021), United States ambassador to Germany (2018–2020) and Acting Director of National Intelligence (2020)
- Nikki Haley, United States ambassador to the United Nations (2017–2018) and governor of South Carolina (2011–2017)
- Morgan Ortagus, spokesperson for the United States Department of State (2019–2021)
- Kash Patel, chief of staff to the United States Secretary of Defense (2020–2021)
- Rick Perry, United States Secretary of Energy (2017–2019) and governor of Texas (2000–2015)
- Mike Pompeo, 70th U.S. secretary of state (2018–2021)
- Matt Schlapp, White House Director of Political Affairs (2003–2005)
- Mercedes Schlapp, White House Director of Strategic Communications (2017–2019)
- Matthew Whitaker, acting United States attorney general (2018–2019), Chief of Staff to the United States attorney general (2017–2018) and United States attorney for the Southern District of Iowa (2004–2009)

U.S. senators

- Marsha Blackburn, U.S. senator from Tennessee (2019–present)
- Tom Cotton, U.S. senator from Arkansas (2015–present) and former U.S. representative for Arkansas's 4th congressional district (2013–2015)
- Ted Cruz, U.S. senator from Texas (2013–present)
- Josh Hawley, U.S. senator from Missouri (2019–present) and former Missouri attorney general (2017–2019)
- Cindy Hyde-Smith, U.S. senator from Mississippi (2018–present)
- Mitch McConnell, U.S. senator from Kentucky (1985–present) and Senate minority leader (2021–2025)
- Rick Scott, U.S. senator from Florida (2019–present) and former governor of Florida (2011–2019)

U.S. representatives

- Mark Amodei, U.S. representative for Nevada's 2nd congressional district (2011–present)
- Tulsi Gabbard, former U.S. representative for Hawaii's 2nd congressional district (2013–2021) (Independent)

Governors

- Ron DeSantis, governor of Florida (2019–present) and former U.S. representative for Florida's 6th congressional district (2013–2018)

State officials

- Pam Bondi, attorney general of Florida (2011–2019)

State legislators

- Bob Barengo, former speaker of the Nevada Assembly (1981–1982) and member of the Nevada Assembly from the 29th District (1972–1982) (Democratic)
- John Ellison, member of the Nevada Assembly from the 33rd District (2011–2022) and speaker pro tempore of the Nevada Assembly (2014–2016)
- Andy Matthews, member of the Nevada Assembly from the 37th District (2020–2022)
- Jim Wheeler, member of the Nevada Assembly from the 39th District (2013–2022) and Minority Leader of the Nevada Assembly (2017–2019)

Local officials

- Victoria Seaman, member of Las Vegas City Council from the 2nd ward (2019–2025) and member of the Nevada Assembly from the 34th district (2014–2016)

Party officials

- Thomas O. Hicks Jr., co-chair of the Republican National Committee (2019–2023)
- Ronna McDaniel, chair of the Republican National Committee (2017–2024)
- Ralph Reed, chair of the Georgia Republican Party (2001–2003)

Individuals

- Mark Levin, radio host
- Chuck Norris, martial artist and actor
- Donald Trump Jr., businessman and son of Donald Trump

Organizations

- 60 Plus Association
- American Conservative Union
- Campaign for Working Families
- Club for Growth
- FreedomWorks for America
- Gun Owners of America
- Heritage Action
- Huck PAC
- Log Cabin Republicans
- National Federation of Independent Business
- National Republican Senatorial Committee
- National Right to Life Committee
- Political Victory Fund
- Republican Jewish Coalition
- Senate Conservatives Fund
- Tea Party Express

Labor unions

- Las Vegas Peace Officers Association
- National Association of Police Organizations
- National Border Patrol Council
- Nevada Fraternal Order of Police
- Public Safety Alliance of Nevada

=== Polling ===
Aggregate polls

Source of poll aggregation	Dates administered	Dates updated	Catherine Cortez Masto (D)	Adam Laxalt (R)	Undecided (Note: Calculated by taking the difference of 100% and all other candidates combined.)	Margin
Real Clear Politics	October 24 – November 7, 2022	November 8, 2022	45.4%	48.8%	5.8%	Laxalt +3.4
FiveThirtyEight	October 5 – November 8, 2022	November 8, 2022	45.9%	47.3%	6.8%	Laxalt +1.4
270towin	October 27 – November 7, 2022	November 8, 2022	45.0%	48.8%	6.2%	Laxalt +3.8
Average			45.4%	48.3%	6.3%	Laxalt +2.9

View source data.

Poll source	Date(s) administered	Sample size	Margin of error	Catherine Cortez Masto (D)	Adam Laxalt (R)	None of These Candidates	Other	Undecided
The Trafalgar Group (R)	November 5–7, 2022	1,089 (LV)	± 2.9%	45%	50%	–	2% (Note: Scott (L) with 1%; "Other" with 1%)	2%
Research Co.	November 4–6, 2022	450 (LV)	± 4.6%	46%	47%	–	2% (Note: "Some other candidate/None of them" with 2%)	5%
Data for Progress (D)	November 2–6, 2022	1,100 (LV)	± 3.0%	47%	49%	1%	3% (Note: Scott (L) with 2%; "Another candidate" with 1%)	–
InsiderAdvantage (R) (Note: Poll conducted for American Greatness, a conservative news and opinions site.)	November 4, 2022	550 (LV)	± 4.2%	44%	50%	–	2% (Note: "Another candidate" with 2%)	5%
KAConsulting (R) (Note: Poll conducted for Citizens United, a conservative non-profit organization.)	November 2–3, 2022	501 (LV)	± 4.4%	45%	44%	–	1%	9%
Cygnal (R)	November 1–2, 2022	600 (LV)	–	43%	46%	–	5% (Note: "Third-party candidate" with 5%)	6%
Emerson College	October 26–29, 2022	2,000 (LV)	± 2.1%	45%	50%	1%	2% (Note: Lindemann (I) with 1%; Scott (L) with 1%; Rubinson (IA) with <1%)	3%
Emerson College	October 26–29, 2022	2,000 (LV)	± 2.1%	46%	51%	1%	3% (Note: Lindemann (I) with 1%; Scott (L) with 1%; Rubinson (IA) with 1%)	–
Suffolk University	October 24–28, 2022	500 (LV)	± 4.4%	45%	44%	3%	4% (Note: Scott (L) with 2%; Lindemann (I) with 1%; Rubinson (IA) with 1%)	5%
OH Predictive Insights	October 24–27, 2022	600 (LV)	± 4.0%	43%	41%	1%	5% (Note: Lindemann (I) with 2%; Rubinson (IA) with 1%; Scott (L) with 1%; "Refused" with 1%)	10%
Susquehanna Polling and Research (R) (Note: Poll conducted for BUSR, an online gambling website.)	October 24–27, 2022	500 (LV)	± 4.3%	43%	48%	<1%	4% (Note: Rubinson (IA) with 2%; Scott (L) with 1%; "Refuse" with 1%)	5%
Echelon Insights	October 24–26, 2022	500 (LV)	± 4.9%	45%	45%	–	2% (Note: Lindemann (I) with 1%; Scott (I) with 1%; Rubinson (IA) with <1%)	8%
Echelon Insights	October 24–26, 2022	500 (LV)	± 4.9%	46%	48%	–	–	6%
The Trafalgar Group (R)	October 21–24, 2022	1,100 (LV)	± 2.9%	46%	50%	–	3% (Note: Scott (L) with 3%)	2%
Siena Research/NYT	October 19–24, 2022	885 (LV)	± 4.2%	47%	47%	–	2% (Note: Rubinson (IA) with 1%; Scott (L) with 1%; Lindemann (I) with <1%)	4%
Phillips Academy	October 22–23, 2022	1,052 (LV)	± 3.0%	49%	47%	–	–	4%
InsiderAdvantage (R)	October 20, 2022	550 (LV)	± 4.2%	46%	48%	–	2% (Note: "Another candidate" with 2%)	4%
CBS News/YouGov	October 14–19, 2022	1,057 (LV)	± 4.4%	48%	49%	–	3% (Note: "Someone else" with 3%)	–
Data for Progress (D)	October 13–19, 2022	819 (LV)	± 3.0%	48%	49%	–	2% (Note: Scott (L) with 1%; "Another candidate" with 1%)	1%
BSP Research/Shaw & Co. (Note: Poll conducted for Univision.)	October 12–19, 2022	1,000 (RV)	± 3.1%	44%	42%	–	5% (Note: "Someone else" with 5%)	10%
University of Nevada, Reno	October 5–19, 2022	586 (LV)	± 4.0%	52%	39%	–	3% (Note: "Some other candidate" with 3%)	5%
WPA Intelligence (R)	October 16–18, 2022	500 (LV)	± 4.4%	43%	45%	–	6% (Note: Scott (L) with 4%; Rubinson (IA) with 2%)	–
Rasmussen Reports (R)	October 13–17, 2022	707 (LV)	± 4.0%	43%	48%	–	4% (Note: "Some other candidate" with 4%)	5%
Suffolk University	October 4–7, 2022	500 (LV)	± 4.4%	46%	44%	3%	3% (Note: Lindemann (I) with 1%; Rubinson (IA) with 1%; Scott (L) with 1%)	5%
WPA Intelligence (R)	October 2–4, 2022	500 (LV)	± 4.4%	44%	42%	–	4% (Note: Rubinson (IA) and Scott (L) with 2%)	10%
CNN/SSRS	September 26 – October 2, 2022	926 (RV)	± 4.7%	47%	44%	2%	3% (Note: "Other" with 3%)	1%
CNN/SSRS	September 26 – October 2, 2022	828 (LV)	± 5.0%	46%	48%	2%	3% (Note: "Other" with 3%)	–
OH Predictive Insights	September 20–29, 2022	741 (LV)	± 3.6%	43%	45%	3%	2% (Note: Robinson (IA) with 1%; Scott (L) with 1%)	7%
InsiderAdvantage (R)	September 20, 2022	550 (LV)	± 4.2%	43%	46%	–	2% (Note: "Someone else" with 2%)	9%
Big Data Poll (R)	September 18–20, 2022	750 (LV)	± 3.4%	44%	46%	–	–	–
The Trafalgar Group (R)	September 17–20, 2022	1,086 (LV)	± 2.9%	43%	47%	–	5% (Note: Scott (L) with 2%; "Other" with 3%)	5%
Data for Progress (D)	September 14–19, 2022	874 (LV)	± 3.0%	46%	47%	–	6% (Note: Scott (L) with 4%; "Another candidate" with 2%)	2%
Emerson College	September 8–10, 2022	1,000 (LV)	± 3.0%	41%	42%	–	4%	11%
Fabrizio Ward (R)/Impact Research (D)	August 16–24, 2022	1,332 (LV)	± 4.4%	44%	40%	3%	4% (Note: Rubinson with 2%; Lindemann and Scott with 1%)	9%
Fabrizio Ward (R)/Impact Research (D)	August 16–24, 2022	1,332 (LV)	± 4.4%	48%	47%	–	–	6%
The Trafalgar Group (R)	August 15–18, 2022	1,082 (LV)	± 2.9%	44%	47%	–	4% (Note: Scott with 2%; "Other" with 1%)	6%
Suffolk University	August 14–17, 2022	500 (LV)	± 4.4%	45%	38%	3%	3% (Note: Scott with 2%; Rubinson with 1%; Lindemann with 0%)	12%
Beacon Research (D) (Note: This poll was sponsored by the Environmental Voter Project)	July 5–20, 2022	479 (RV)	± 4.5%	49%	39%	–	1%	7%
Beacon Research (D)	July 5–20, 2022	301 (LV)	± 5.6%	51%	45%	–	1%	2%
Emerson College	July 7–10, 2022	2,000 (RV)	± 2.1%	44%	41%	–	6%	9%
Change Research (D) (Note: This poll was sponsored by Future Majority and America's Future Majority Fund)	June 24–27, 2022	701 (LV)	± 3.7%	46%	43%	–	–	12%
University of Nevada, Reno	May 17–27, 2022	1,098 (A)	± 3.4%	48%	27%	–	11%	14%
McLaughlin & Associates (R) (Note: This poll was sponsored by Battle Born Values PAC)	April 18–20, 2022	600 (LV)	± 4.0%	46%	47%	–	–	7%
OH Predictive Insights	April 1–9, 2022	748 (RV)	± 4.4%	43%	35%	–	–	22%
Suffolk University	April 2–6, 2022	500 (LV)	± 4.4%	40%	43%	3%	–	14%
Blueprint Polling (D)	March 21–24, 2022	671 (LV)	± 3.8%	40%	47%	–	–	13%
Change Research (D)	March 2022	– (LV)	–	44%	46%	–	–	10%
OH Predictive Insights	January 19–26, 2022	755 (RV)	± 3.6%	44%	35%	–	–	21%
The Trafalgar Group (R)	November 24–29, 2021	1,034 (LV)	± 3.0%	41%	44%	–	–	15%
NRSC (R) (Note: This poll was sponsored by the National Republican Senatorial Committee)	November 14–17, 2021	571 (LV)	± 4.1%	42%	46%	–	–	12%
The Mellman Group (D)	September 15–22, 2021	600 (LV)	± 4.0%	46%	41%	3%	–	10%
WPA Intelligence (R)	September 11–15, 2021	504 (LV)	± 4.4%	37%	39%	12%	–	12%
VCreek/AMG (R) (Note: Poll sponsored by Americas PAC)	August 9–14, 2021	567 (RV)	± 4.1%	32%	42%	–	–	26%

Hypothetical polling

Catherine Cortez Masto vs. Sam Brown

Poll source	Date(s) administered	Sample size	Margin of error	Catherine Cortez Masto (D)	Sam Brown (R)	None of These Candidates	Other	Undecided
University of Nevada, Reno	May 17–27, 2022	1,098 (A)	± 3.4%	47%	24%	–	13%	16%
OH Predictive Insights	April 1–9, 2022	748 (RV)	± 4.4%	42%	34%	–	–	24%
Suffolk University	April 2–6, 2022	500 (LV)	± 4.4%	39%	40%	5%	–	17%

=== Results ===
Cortez Masto won urban Clark County and Washoe County, home to Las Vegas and Reno respectively. Combined, these two counties contain more than 80% of the state's total population. While her margin in Clark County fell from 11% in 2016 to 8% in this election, she flipped Washoe County, which she lost by less than 1% in 2016, with a 4% margin of victory. Laxalt won by landslide margins in Nevada's rural counties, but they are lightly populated and cast less than 16% of the total vote. In the end, Cortez Masto's victories in the state's two largest counties gave her too large a lead for Laxalt to overcome in rural Nevada. Lee Zeldin, in a CNN interview on February 27, 2024, also noted how snow in northern Nevada might have affected rural turnout, giving Masto an advantage. As of 2025, no Republican has won any U.S. Senate race in Nevada since 2012.

2022 United States Senate election in Nevada
Party	Candidate	Votes	%	±%
Democratic	Catherine Cortez Masto (incumbent)	498,316	48.81%	+1.71%
Republican	Adam Laxalt	490,388	48.04%	+3.37%
None of These Candidates		12,441	1.22%	-2.59%
Independent	Barry Lindemann	8,075	0.79%	N/A
Libertarian	Neil Scott	6,422	0.63%	N/A
Independent American	Barry Rubinson	5,208	0.51%	−1.04%
Total votes		1,020,850	100.00%	
Democratic hold				

==== By county ====
County	Catherine Cortez Masto Democratic		Adam Laxalt Republican		Various candidates Other parties		Margin		Total votes
County	#	%	#	%	#	%	#	%	Total votes
Carson City	10,337	43.63	12,451	52.55	906	3.82	-2,114	-8.92	23,694
Churchill	2,423	24.52	7,032	71.17	425	4.30	-4,609	-46.65	9,880
Clark	357,275	52.40	304,133	44.61	20,390	2.99	53,142	7.79	681,798
Douglas	9,466	32.45	18,890	64.76	813	2.79	-9,424	-32.31	29,169
Elko	3,286	20.30	12,180	75.23	725	4.48	-8,894	-54.93	16,191
Esmeralda	68	14.98	344	75.77	42	9.25	-276	-60.79	454
Eureka	73	9.35	671	85.92	37	4.74	-598	-76.57	781
Humboldt	1,358	22.22	4,456	72.91	298	4.88	-3,098	-50.69	6,112
Lander	387	17.50	1,673	75.63	152	6.87	-1,286	-58.14	2,212
Lincoln	321	14.88	1,727	80.06	109	5.05	-1,406	-65.18	2,157
Lyon	6,244	26.44	16,293	68.99	1,079	4.57	-10,049	-42.55	23,616
Mineral	660	34.85	1,124	59.35	110	5.81	-464	-24.50	1,894
Nye	5,957	28.61	13,833	66.43	1,033	4.96	-7,876	-37.82	20,823
Pershing	419	23.58	1,272	71.58	86	4.84	-853	-48.00	1,777
Storey	721	28.15	1,728	67.47	112	4.37	-1,007	-39.32	2,561
Washoe	98,617	50.76	90,002	46.33	5,661	2.91	8,615	4.43	194,280
White Pine	704	20.40	2,579	74.73	168	4.87	-1,875	-54.33	3,451
Totals	498,316	48.81	490,388	48.04	32,146	3.15	7,928	0.78	1,020,850

Counties that flipped from Republican to Democratic

- Washoe (largest municipality: Reno)

==== By congressional district ====
District	Cortez Masto	Laxalt	Representative
1st	52.0%	44.8%	Dina Titus
2nd	42.7%	53.9%	Mark Amodei
3rd	51.7%	45.8%	Susie Lee
4th	50.8%	45.7%	Steven Horsford

== Exit poll ==
2022 United States Senate election in Nevada voter demographics (CNN)
Demographic subgroup	Cortez Masto	Laxalt	% of total vote
Ideology
Liberals	94	4	23
Moderates	57	39	42
Conservatives	9	89	35
Party
Democrats	96	4	34
Republicans	5	93	36
Independents	48	45	30
Joe Biden approval rating
Approve	93	6	45
Disapprove	11	86	54
Most important issue to your vote
Inflation	25	72	36
Abortion	89	9	28
Crime	45	54	11
Immigration	16	84	11
Gun policy	N/A	N/A	6
2020 presidential vote
Joe Biden	92	7	44
Donald Trump	3	96	44
Did not vote	N/A	N/A	7
Another candidate	N/A	N/A	3
Gender
Men	43	55	46
Women	52	44	54
Race
White	40	58	67
Latino	62	33	12
Black	83	14	11
Asian	57	43	4
Other	48	44	5
Race by gender
White men	36	63	32
White women	43	54	36
Black men	72	25	4
Black women	89	8	7
Latino men	62	39	6
Latina women	61	37	7
Other	52	43	9
Age
18–29	64	31	12
30–44	60	36	20
45–64	41	57	36
65 or older	42	56	32
Area type
Urban	51	47	73
Suburban	52	40	15
Rural	28	70	12
Education
College graduate	53	46	36
No college degree	45	52	64
Education by race
White college graduates	48	51	26
Whites without college	35	62	41
Non-white college graduates	63	34	10
Non-whites without college	67	28	22
Education by race and gender
White women with college degrees	55	42	13
White women without college degrees	36	60	23
White men with college degrees	41	58	14
White men without college degrees	33	66	18
Voters of color	66	30	33
Educational attainment
Never attended college	43	53	16
Some college	49	49	30
Associate's degree	43	51	18
Bachelor's degree	48	49	21
Advanced degree	57	41	15

== See also ==
- 2022 United States Senate elections
- 2022 Nevada elections

== Notes ==
Partisan clients
