= 2022 Nevada gubernatorial election =

- November 8, 2022
- Turnout: 54.58% ▼
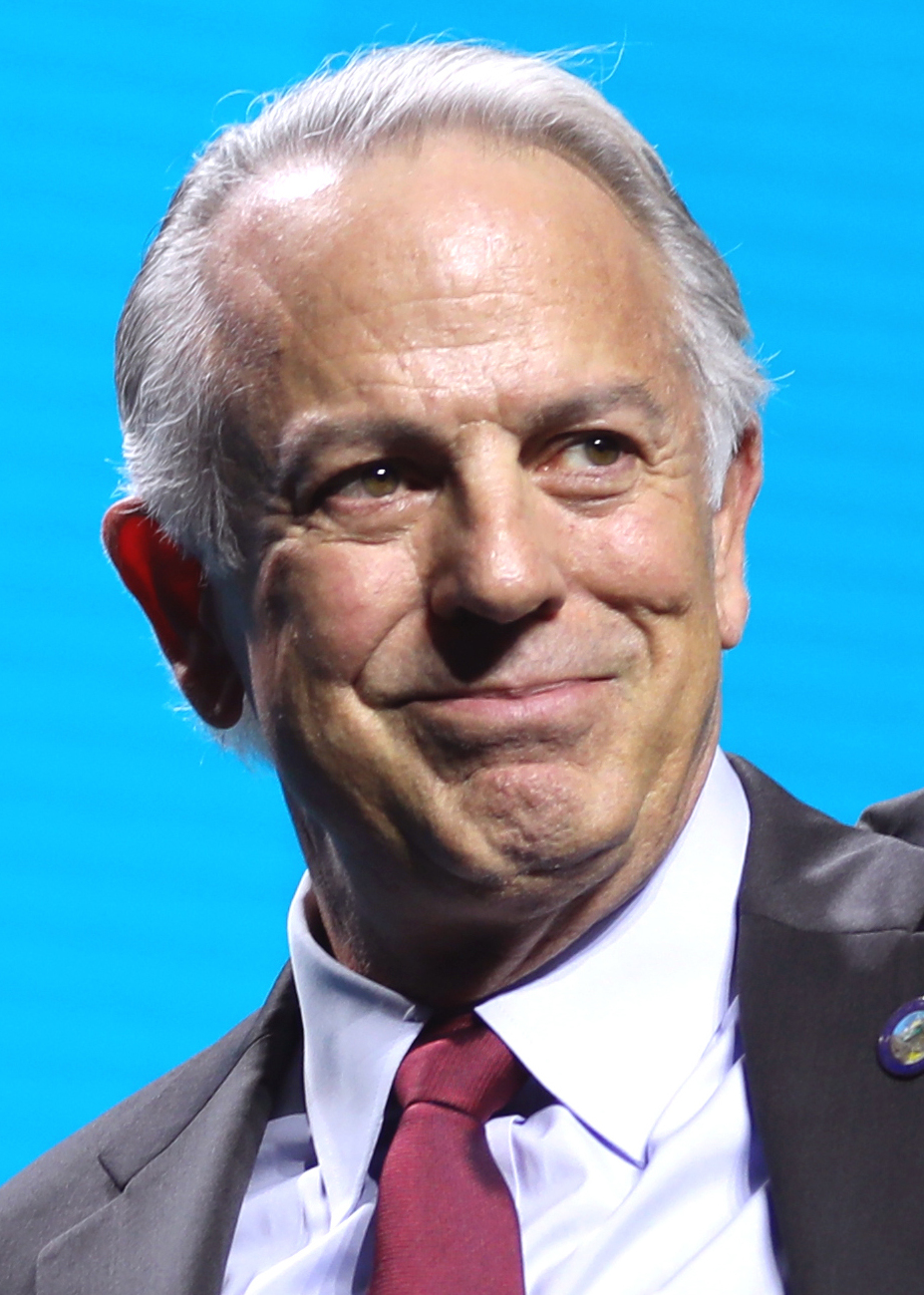

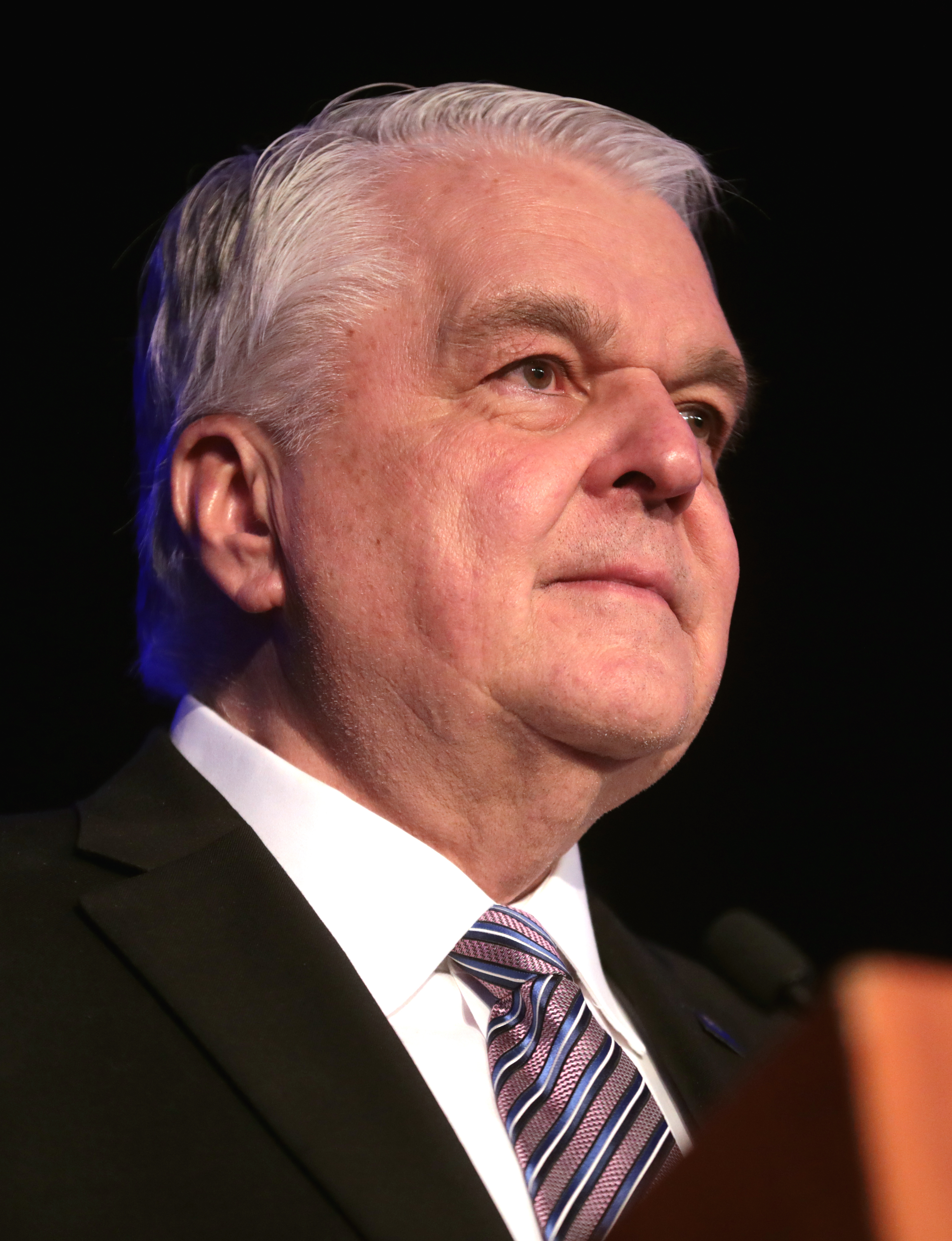
Nominee	Joe Lombardo	Steve Sisolak
Party	Republican	Democratic
Popular vote	497,377	481,991
Percentage	48.81%	47.30%
- Lombardo: 40–50% 50–60% 60–70% 70–80% 80–90% >90% Sisolak: 40–50% 50–60% 60–70% 70–80% 80–90% >90% Tie: 40–50% 50% No votes
Governor before election
Steve Sisolak
Democratic
Elected Governor
Joe Lombardo
Republican

The 2022 Nevada gubernatorial election took place on November 8, 2022, to elect the governor of Nevada. Incumbent Democratic governor Steve Sisolak ran for re-election to a second term, but lost in the general election to Republican Joe Lombardo, the Clark County sheriff. This was the first time since 1966 that an incumbent Democratic governor lost reelection in Nevada, and the first since 1982 that any incumbent governor of Nevada lost reelection. (Note: In the 2010 gubernatorial election, Republican incumbent Governor Jim Gibbons lost renomination in the Republican primary to Brian Sandoval, who won the election.)

Sisolak was the first Democrat to seek re-election to Nevada's governorship since Bob Miller in 1994, and was subsequently the only incumbent governor in the United States to lose re-election in 2022. Decision Desk HQ called the race for Lombardo on November 11.

Significantly, Lombardo's win marked the first time in the state's history that anyone had won the governorship without winning either Clark or Washoe counties, home to a combined 89% of the state's population. This was largely due to Lombardo's stronger performance in Clark, his home county; Sisolak's previous opponent, Adam Laxalt, lost the county by 13.3% there, while Lombardo only lost by 5.7%, a significant gain.

Political analysts have attributed Sisolak's defeat to his handling of the COVID-19 pandemic; lockdowns during the pandemic proved unpopular in Nevada, which has a tourism-driven economy and a reputation for libertarian political leanings.

Amid a slate of failed gubernatorial pickup attempts, this was the only governorship Republicans flipped in the 2022 elections, as well as the only state governorship to flip to the party that did not carry that state in the 2020 presidential election. This was also the first time since Pat Quinn's defeat in the 2014 Illinois gubernatorial election that an incumbent Democratic governor lost re-election in any state.

== Democratic primary ==
=== Candidates ===
==== Nominee ====
- Steve Sisolak, incumbent governor (2019–2023) and former Clark County commissioner (2009–2019)

==== Eliminated in primary ====
- Tom Collins, former Clark County commissioner (2005–2015) and former state assemblyman for the 1st District (1993–2001)

==== Declined ====
- Marilyn Kirkpatrick, Clark County commissioner (2015–present)

=== Endorsements ===
Steve Sisolak

Organizations

- Human Rights Campaign
- NARAL Pro-Choice America
- Natural Resources Defense Council

Newspapers

- Las Vegas Sun

Labor unions

- Nevada AFL–CIO
- United Auto Workers

=== Results ===
Results by county: Sisolak: 50–60%; 60–70%; 70–80%; 80–90%; 90–100%

Democratic primary results
Party	Candidate	Votes	%
Democratic	Steve Sisolak (incumbent)	157,283	89.53%
Democratic	Tom Collins	12,051	6.86%
None of These Candidates		6,340	3.61%
Total votes		175,674	100.0%

== Republican primary ==
=== Candidates ===
==== Nominee ====
- Joe Lombardo, sheriff of Clark County (2015–2023)

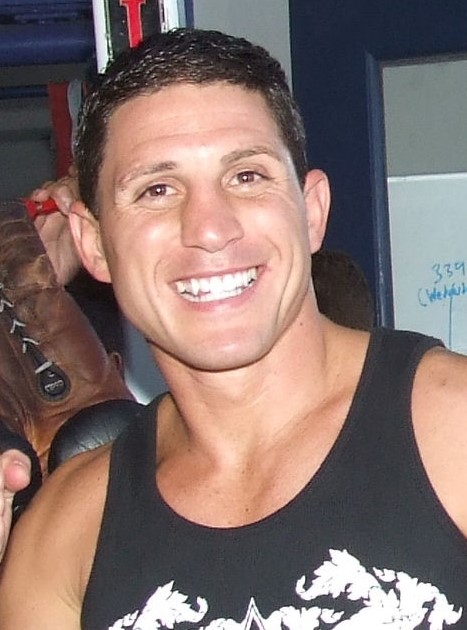
Attorney Joey Gilbert placed second in the primary.

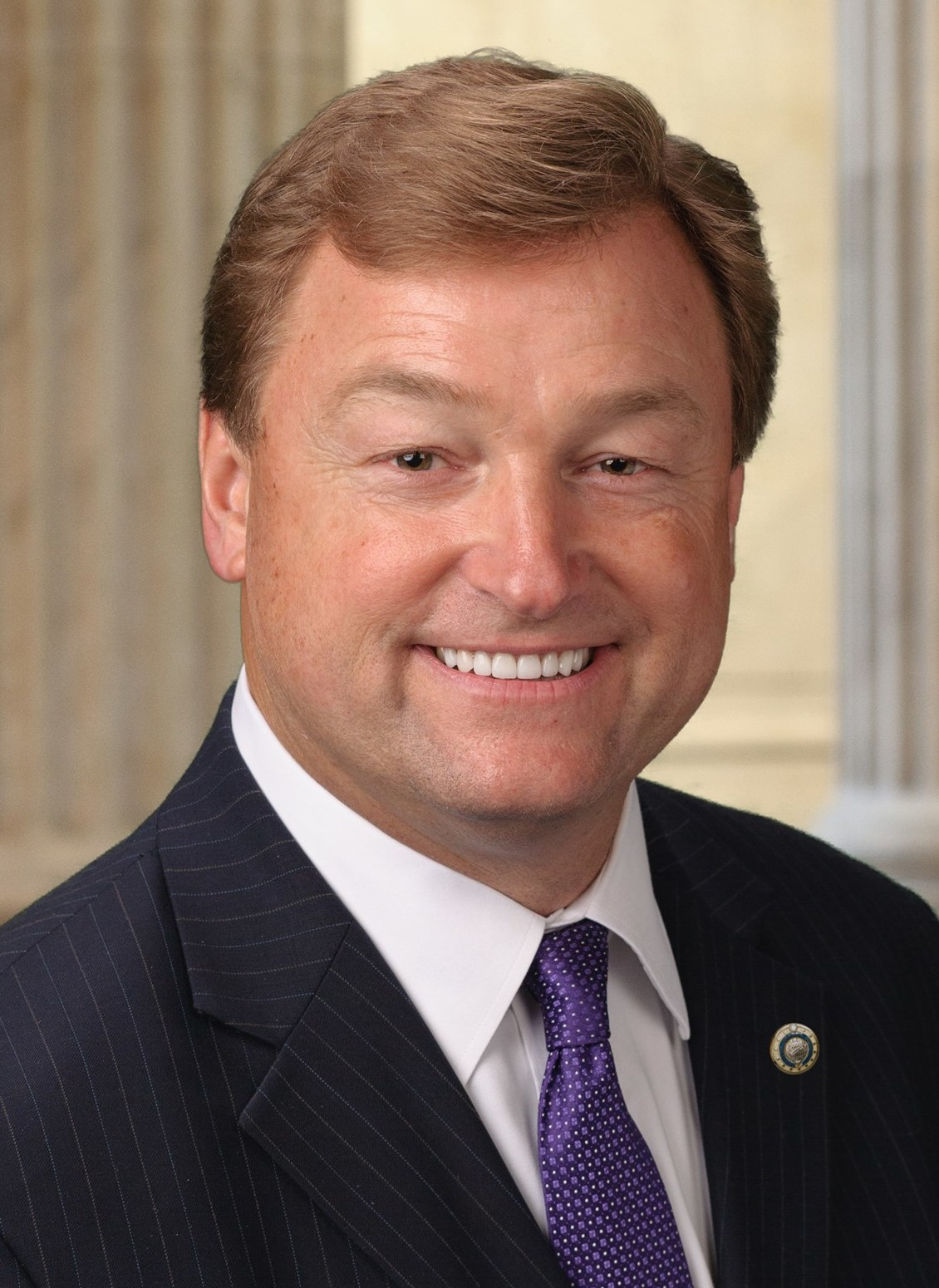
Former senator Dean Heller placed third in the primary.

==== Eliminated in primary ====
- Seven Achilles Evans, businessman
- Gary "Radar" Evertsen
- Joey Gilbert, attorney and former boxer
- Eddie Hamilton, businessman and perennial candidate
- Tom Heck, retired Air Force officer and candidate for U.S. Senate in 2016 and 2018
- Dean Heller, former U.S. senator (2011–2019) and U.S. representative for Nevada's 2nd congressional district (2007–2011)
- John Lee, mayor of North Las Vegas (2013–2022)
- Stan Lusak, candidate for governor in 2018
- Guy Nohra, venture capitalist
- Edward O'Brien
- Fred J. Simon, small business owner and surgeon
- William "Dock" Walls, businessman and perennial candidate
- Amber Whitley
- Barak Zilberberg, real estate investor

==== Withdrew ====
- Michele Fiore, Las Vegas city councilwoman (2017–2022) and former state assemblywoman for the 4th District (2012–2016) (ran for state treasurer and lost)

==== Declined ====
- Mark Amodei, U.S. representative for Nevada's 2nd congressional district (2011–present) (ran for re-election and won)
- Heidi Gansert, state senator from the 15th district (2016–2024)
- Rick Harrison, businessman and reality television personality
- Mark Hutchison, former lieutenant governor of Nevada (2015–2019) (endorsed Lombardo)
- Ben Kieckhefer, state senator from the 16th district (2010–2021), member of the Nevada Gaming Commission (2021–2023)
- Adam Laxalt, former Nevada attorney general (2015–2019) and nominee for governor in 2018 (ran for the U.S. Senate and lost)
- Derek Stevens, casino owner

=== Debates ===
2022 Nevada gubernatorial Republican primary election debates (Note: Minor candidates who didn't participate in any of the debates are omitted.)
No.	Date	Organizer	Location	Key: P Participant A Absent N Non-invitee I Invitee W Withdrawn									Source
No.	Date	Organizer	Location	Michele Fiore	Joey Gilbert	Tom Heck	Dean Heller	John Lee	Joe Lombardo	Guy Nohra	Fred Simon	Barak Zilberberg	Source
1	January 6, 2022	Nevada Commonwealth & Sierra Republican Club	Atlantis Casino Resort Spa, Reno	P	P	P	P	P	A	P	P	P	
2	February 8, 2022	Clark County Republican Club	Dragon Ridge Country Club, Henderson	P	P	N	P	P	A	P	P	N	
3	April 20, 2022	Republican Women of Las Vegas	Las Vegas	W	P	N	P	P	A	P	P	N	
4	May 26, 2022	8 News Now	Las Vegas	W	P	N	P	P	P	P	N	N	

=== Endorsements ===
Joey Gilbert

Executive branch officials

- Michael Flynn, retired U.S. Army lieutenant general and the 25th U.S. national security advisor

Organizations

- Nevada Republican Party
Dean Heller

Organizations

- Nevada Police Union
Joe Lombardo

Executive branch officials

- Mike Pompeo, former U.S. secretary of state (2018–2021)
- Donald Trump, 45th president of the United States (2017–2021)

State officials

- Mark Hutchison, former lieutenant governor of Nevada (2015–2019)
William "Dock" Walls

Newspapers

- Las Vegas Sun

=== Polling ===
Graphical summary

Source of poll aggregation	Dates administered	Dates updated	Joey Gilbert	Dean Heller	John Lee	Joe Lombardo	Guy Nohra	Fred Simon	Other (Note: Calculated by taking the difference of 100% and all other candidates combined.)	Margin
Real Clear Politics	April 25 – June 7, 2022	June 10, 2022	18.3%	14.7%	11.5%	33.0%	7.5%	3.5%	11.5%	Lombardo +14.7

Poll source	Date(s) administered	Sample size (Note: Key: A – all adults RV – registered voters LV – likely voters V – unclear)	Margin of error	Michele Fiore	Joey Gilbert	Dean Heller	John Lee	Joe Lombardo	Guy Nohra	Fred Simon	None of These Candidates	Other	Undecided
OH Predictive Insights	June 6–7, 2022	525 (LV)	± 4.4%	–	21%	10%	10%	34%	6%	4%	3%	4% (Note: Heck with 2%; Hamilton and Walls with 1%; Evans, Eversten, Lusak, O'Brien, and Zilberberg with 0%)	7%
University of Nevada Reno	May 17–27, 2022	368 (LV)	± 5.9%	–	12%	14%	9%	47%	2%	3%	–	13% (Note: Evertsen, Heck, Lusak, O'Brien, and Wells with 2%; Hamilton, Whitley, and Zilberberg with 1%; Evans with <1%)	–
OH Predictive Insights	May 10–12, 2022	500 (LV)	± 4.4%	–	15%	11%	9%	35%	3%	3%	4%	5% (Note: Sisolak (erroneously included by pollster due to an oversight) with 3%; Heck and Lusak with 1%; Evans, Evertsen, Hamilton, O'Brien, Walls, and Zilberberg with 0%)	14%
Emerson College	April 30 – May 2, 2022	1,000 (LV)	± 3.0%	–	14%	11%	10%	33%	4%	2%	–	3% (Note: Hamilton and Zilberberg with 1%; Evans, Evertsen, Heck, Lusak, Walls, and Whitley with 0%)	25%
The Trafalgar Group (R)	April 25–28, 2022	1,071 (LV)	± 3.0%	–	18%	18%	13%	26%	9%	3%	–	7%	6%
	March 17, 2022	Fiore withdraws from the race											
WPA Intelligence (R) (Note: This poll was sponsored by Club for Growth Action, which supports Laxalt.)	March 13–15, 2022	500 (LV)	± 4.4%	5%	9%	22%	13%	28%	1%	–	–	2%	17%
Public Policy Polling (D) (Note: Poll sponsored by the Democratic Governors Association)	March 7–8, 2022	580 (LV)	± 4.1%	8%	12%	13%	13%	26%	1%	–	–	–	27%
OH Predictive Insights	January 19–26, 2022	230 (RV)	± 6.5%	8%	7%	9%	5%	28%	1%	2%	–	1% (Note: Heck with 1%; Zilberberg with 0%)	36%
The Tarrance Group (R) (Note: Poll sponsored by Better Nevada, which supports Lombardo)	November 7–9, 2021	500 (LV)	± 4.5%	8%	7%	19%	5%	37%	0%	3%	–	1% (Note: Hamilton with 1%)	37%
The Mellman Group (D)	September 15–22, 2021	400 (LV)	± 4.9%	–	11%	31%	3%	23%	0%	1%	3%	0% (Note: Hamilton with 0%)	27%
The Tarrance Group (R)	July 2021	– (LV)	–	–	7%	27%	13%	22%	1%	–	–	–	28%

=== Results ===
Results by county: Lombardo: 20–30%; 30–40%; 40–50%; Gilbert: 20–30%; 30–40%; 40–50%

Republican primary results
Party	Candidate	Votes	%
Republican	Joe Lombardo	87,761	38.40%
Republican	Joey Gilbert	61,738	27.01%
Republican	Dean Heller	32,087	14.04%
Republican	John Lee	17,846	7.81%
Republican	Guy Nohra	8,348	3.65%
Republican	Fred J. Simon	6,856	3.00%
Republican	Thomas Heck	4,315	1.89%
None of These Candidates		4,219	1.85%
Republican	Eddie Hamilton	1,293	0.57%
Republican	Amber Whitley	1,238	0.54%
Republican	William Walls	833	0.36%
Republican	Gary Evertsen	558	0.24%
Republican	Seven Achilles Evans	475	0.21%
Republican	Edward O'Brien	422	0.18%
Republican	Barak Zilberberg	352	0.15%
Republican	Stanleigh Lusak	229	0.10%
Total votes		228,570	100.0%

== Libertarian primary ==
=== Candidates ===
==== Declared ====
- Brandon Davis, advertising agency owner

== Independent American primary ==
=== Candidates ===
==== Declared ====
- Ed Bridges, nominee for Nevada's 3rd congressional district in 2020

== Independents ==
=== Candidates ===
==== Declared ====
- Bradley Beck, geologist
- Austin Billings, logistics professional
- Monique Richardson, pastor

== General election ==
=== Predictions ===
Source	Ranking	As of
The Cook Political Report	Tossup	March 4, 2022
Inside Elections	Tossup	September 23, 2022
Sabato's Crystal Ball	Lean R (flip)	November 7, 2022
Politico	Tossup	April 1, 2022
RCP	Tossup	January 10, 2022
Fox News	Tossup	May 12, 2022
538	Lean R (flip)	November 7, 2022
Elections Daily	Lean R (flip)	November 7, 2022

=== Post-primary endorsements ===
Steve Sisolak (D)

Executive branch officials

- Barack Obama, 44th president of the United States (2009–2017)

U.S. senators

- Catherine Cortez Masto, U.S. senator from Nevada (2017–present)

Organizations

- AAPI Victory Fund
- AFSCME Local 4041
- Building & Construction Trades Council of Northern Nevada
- Clark County Black Caucus
- Defend the Vote PAC
- Everytown for Gun Safety
- Giffords
- IATSE Local 720
- Jewish Dems
- League of Conservation Voters - Nevada
- National Democratic Redistricting Committee
- National LGBT Chamber of Commerce
- National Organization for Women
- Nevada Faculty Alliance
- Nevada Recovery PAC
- NextGen America
- Planned Parenthood
- Professional Fire Fighters of Nevada
- SEIU of Nevada
- Silver State Equality
- Somos Votantes
- Southern Nevada Building Trades Unions
- United Brotherhood of Carpenters and Joiners of America
- Vegas Chamber

Labor unions

- Culinary Workers Union
- International Brotherhood of Electrical Workers
- Iron Workers Union
Joe Lombardo (R)

Governors

- Glenn Youngkin, governor of Virginia (2022–2026)

Individuals

- Robert Bigelow, businessman
- Joey Gilbert, attorney, former boxer, and candidate in the Republican primary

Newspapers

- Las Vegas Review-Journal

Organizations

- Las Vegas Police Protective Association
- Nevada Police Union
- NRA Political Victory Fund

=== Polling ===
Aggregate polls

Source of poll aggregation	Dates administered	Dates updated	Steve Sisolak (D)	Joe Lombardo (R)	Undecided (Note: Calculated by taking the difference of 100% and all other candidates combined.)	Margin
Real Clear Politics	September 26 – November 6, 2022	November 6, 2022	44.3%	46.9%	8.8%	Lombardo +2.6
FiveThirtyEight	September 15, 2021 – November 6, 2022	November 6, 2022	44.9%	46.6%	8.5%	Lombardo +1.7
Average			44.6%	46.8%	8.6%	Lombardo +2.2

Poll source	Date(s) administered	Sample size	Margin of error	Steve Sisolak (D)	Joe Lombardo (R)	None of These Candidates	Other	Undecided
The Trafalgar Group (R)	November 5–7, 2022	1,089 (LV)	± 2.9%	46%	49%	–	3% (Note: Davis (L) with 2%; "Other" with 1%)	2%
Research Co.	November 4–6, 2022	450 (LV)	± 4.6%	45%	47%	–	3% (Note: "Some other candidate/None of them" with 2%)	5%
Data for Progress (D)	November 2–6, 2022	1,100 (LV)	± 3.0%	46%	48%	2%	5% (Note: Davis (L) with 3%; Bridges (IA) with 1%)	–
InsiderAdvantage (R) (Note: Poll conducted for American Greatness, a conservative news and opinions site.)	November 4, 2022	550 (LV)	± 4.2%	44%	49%	–	4% (Note: Davis (L) with 4%)	4%
KAConsulting (R) (Note: Poll conducted for Citizens United, a conservative non-profit organization.)	November 2–3, 2022	501 (LV)	± 4.4%	43%	45%	–	2%	10%
Cygnal (R)	November 1–2, 2022	600 (LV)	–	42%	47%	–	–	5%
Emerson College	October 26–29, 2022	2,000 (LV)	± 2.1%	45%	49%	–	–	3%
Emerson College	October 26–29, 2022	2,000 (LV)	± 2.1%	46%	50%	–	–	–
Suffolk University	October 24–28, 2022	500 (LV)	± 4.4%	43%	43%	4%	5% (Note: Bridges (IA) with 3%; Davis (L) with 2%)	6%
OH Predictive Insights	October 24–27, 2022	600 (LV)	± 4.0%	45%	41%	1%	4% (Note: Bridges (IA) with 3%; Davis (L) with 1%)	9%
Susquehanna Polling and Research (R) (Note: Poll conducted for BUSR, an online gambling website.)	October 24–27, 2022	500 (LV)	± 4.3%	44%	45%	1%	3% (Note: Bridges (IA) with 1%; Davis (L) with 1%; Refuse" with 1%)	7%
Echelon Insights	October 24–26, 2022	500 (LV)	± 4.9%	44%	45%	–	4% (Note: Bridges (IA) with 2%; Davis (L) with 2%)	7%
Echelon Insights	October 24–26, 2022	500 (LV)	± 4.9%	45%	48%	–	–	6%
The Trafalgar Group (R)	October 21–24, 2022	1,100 (LV)	± 2.9%	44%	51%	–	3% (Note: Davis (L) with 3%)	2%
Siena Research/NYT	October 19–24, 2022	885 (LV)	± 4.2%	45%	49%	–	<1% (Note: Bridges (IA) with <1%; Davis (L) with <1%)	5%
Phillips Academy	October 22–23, 2022	1,052 (LV)	± 3.0%	50%	45%	–	–	5%
InsiderAdvantage (R)	October 20, 2022	550 (LV)	± 4.2%	43%	49%	–	4% (Note: Davis (L) with 4%)	5%
CBS News/YouGov	October 14–19, 2022	1,057 (LV)	± 4.4%	48%	48%	–	4% (Note: "Someone else" with 4%)	–
Data for Progress (D)	October 13–19, 2022	819 (LV)	± 3.0%	47%	48%	–	3% (Note: Bridges (IA) with 2%; Davis (L) with 1%)	2%
BSP Research/Shaw & Co. (Note: Poll conducted for Univision.)	October 12–19, 2022	1,000 (RV)	± 3.1%	43%	41%	–	6% (Note: "Someone else" with 6%)	10%
University of Nevada, Reno	October 5–19, 2022	585 (LV)	± 4.0%	47%	45%	–	4% (Note: "Some other candidate" with 4%)	5%
Rasmussen Reports (R)	October 13–17, 2022	707 (LV)	± 4.0%	42%	47%	–	7% (Note: "Some other candidate" with 7%)	4%
Suffolk University	October 4–7, 2022	500 (LV)	± 4.4%	43%	44%	2%	4% (Note: Bridges (IA) with 3%; Davis (L) with 1%)	7%
CNN/SSRS	September 26 – October 2, 2022	926 (RV)	± 4.7%	46%	46%	5%	2% (Note: "Other" with 2%)	–
CNN/SSRS	September 26 – October 2, 2022	828 (LV)	± 5.0%	46%	48%	4%	2% (Note: "Other" with 2%)	–
OH Predictive Insights	September 20–29, 2022	741 (LV)	± 3.6%	42%	45%	5%	3% (Note: Davis (L) with 2%; Bridges (IA) with 1%)	5%
Big Data Poll	September 18–20, 2022	1,000 (LV)	± 3.0%	40%	42%	–	5%	13%
The Trafalgar Group (R)	September 17–20, 2022	1,086 (LV)	± 2.9%	45%	48%	–	5% (Note: Davis (L) with 3%; "Other" with 2%)	3%
Data for Progress (D)	September 14–19, 2022	874 (LV)	± 3.0%	45%	45%	–	7% (Note: Davis (L) with 4%; Bridges (IA) with 3%)	3%
Emerson College	September 8–10, 2022	750 (LV)	± 3.4%	40%	40%	–	4%	12%
Fabrizio Ward (R)/Impact Research (D)	August 16–24, 2022	1,332 (LV)	± 4.4%	41%	38%	3%	7% (Note: Bridges with 4%; Davis with 3%)	10%
Fabrizio Ward (R)/Impact Research (D)	August 16–24, 2022	1,332 (LV)	± 4.4%	46%	48%	–	–	6%
The Trafalgar Group (R)	August 15–18, 2022	1,082 (LV)	± 2.9%	44%	46%	–	4% (Note: Davis with 4%; "Other" with 1%)	6%
Suffolk University	August 14–17, 2022	500 (LV)	± 4.4%	43%	40%	2%	5% (Note: Bridges with 3%; Davis with 2%)	10%
Beacon Research (D) (Note: This poll was sponsored by the Environmental Voter Project.)	July 5–20, 2022	479 (RV)	± 4.5%	49%	39%	–	1%	6%
Beacon Research (D)	July 5–20, 2022	301 (LV)	± 5.6%	48%	46%	–	2%	3%
Emerson College	July 7–10, 2022	2,000 (RV)	± 2.1%	44%	40%	–	9%	7%
The Tarrance Group (R) (Note: This poll was sponsored by Lombardo's campaign.)	July 5–10, 2022	600 (LV)	± 4.1%	46%	44%	5%	–	5%
Change Research (D) (Note: This poll was sponsored by Future Majority and America's Future Majority Fund.)	June 24–27, 2022	701 (LV)	± 3.7%	46%	43%	–	–	11%
WPA Intelligence (R)	June 4–6, 2022	502 (LV)	± 4.4%	47%	48%	–	–	5%
University of Nevada, Reno	May 17–27, 2022	1,091 (A)	± 3.4%	43%	31%	–	11%	16%
OH Predictive Insights	April 1–9, 2022	748 (RV)	± 4.4%	44%	35%	–	–	21%
Suffolk University	April 2–6, 2022	500 (LV)	± 4.4%	37%	39%	6%	–	18%
Blueprint Polling (D)	March 21–24, 2022	671 (LV)	± 3.8%	40%	43%	–	–	17%
OH Predictive Insights	January 19–26, 2022	755 (RV)	± 3.6%	52%	48%	–	–	–
Impact Research (D)	December 1–7, 2021	800 (LV)	± 3.7%	47%	45%	–	–	8%
OnMessage Inc. (R)	November 16–18, 2021	600 (LV)	± 4.0%	41%	51%	–	–	8%
The Mellman Group (D)	September 15–22, 2021	600 (LV)	± 4.0%	45%	44%	3%	–	8%

Hypothetical polling

Steve Sisolak vs. Joey Gilbert

Poll source	Date(s) administered	Sample size	Margin of error	Steve Sisolak (D)	Joey Gilbert (R)	None of These Candidates	Other	Undecided
University of Nevada, Reno	May 17–27, 2022	1,090 (A)	± 3.4%	43%	17%	–	20%	19%
OH Predictive Insights	April 1–9, 2022	748 (RV)	± 4.4%	45%	31%	–	–	24%
Suffolk University	April 2–6, 2022	500 (LV)	± 4.4%	39%	35%	4%	–	21%

Steve Sisolak vs. Dean Heller

Poll source	Date(s) administered	Sample size	Margin of error	Steve Sisolak (D)	Dean Heller (R)	None of These Candidates	Other	Undecided
University of Nevada, Reno	May 17–27, 2022	1,094 (A)	± 3.4%	44%	21%	–	16%	18%
OH Predictive Insights	April 1–9, 2022	748 (RV)	± 4.4%	46%	33%	–	–	21%
Suffolk University	April 2–6, 2022	500 (LV)	± 4.4%	39%	39%	7%	–	15%
OH Predictive Insights	January 19–26, 2022	755 (RV)	± 3.6%	54%	46%	–	–	–
Impact Research (D)	December 1–7, 2021	800 (LV)	± 3.7%	47%	44%	–	–	8%
The Trafalgar Group (R)	November 24–29, 2021	1,034 (LV)	± 3.0%	40%	47%	–	–	13%
OnMessage Inc. (R)	November 16–18, 2021	600 (LV)	± 4.0%	43%	49%	–	–	8%
The Mellman Group (D)	September 15–22, 2021	600 (LV)	± 4.0%	46%	43%	3%	–	8%

Steve Sisolak vs. John Lee

Poll source	Date(s) administered	Sample size	Margin of error	Steve Sisolak (D)	John Lee (R)	None of These Candidates	Undecided
OH Predictive Insights	April 1–9, 2022	748 (RV)	± 4.4%	46%	33%	–	21%
Suffolk University	April 2–6, 2022	500 (LV)	± 4.4%	37%	40%	5%	18%

Steve Sisolak vs. Guy Nohra

Poll source	Date(s) administered	Sample size	Margin of error	Steve Sisolak (D)	Guy Nohra (R)	None of These Candidates	Undecided
Suffolk University	April 2–6, 2022	500 (LV)	± 4.4%	41%	29%	7%	23%

=== Fundraising ===
Campaign finance reports as of October 17, 2022
Candidate	Raised	Spent	Cash on hand
Joe Lombardo (R)	$3,962,985	$4,849,360	$1,765,137
Steve Sisolak (D)	$6,528,859	$13,525,957	$1,216,990
Source: Nevada Secretary of State

=== Debates ===
2022 Nevada gubernatorial general election debates
No.	Date	Host	Moderator	Link	Democratic	Republican
Key: P Participant A Absent N Non-invitee I Invitee W Withdrawn						
Key: P Participant A Absent N Non-invitee I Invitee W Withdrawn					Steve Sisolak	Joe Lombardo
1	October 2, 2022	KSNV			P	P

== Results ==
2022 Nevada gubernatorial election
Party	Candidate	Votes	%	±%
Republican	Joe Lombardo	497,377	48.81	+3.50
Democratic	Steve Sisolak (incumbent)	481,991	47.30	−2.09
Libertarian	Brandon Davis	14,919	1.46	+0.57
None of These Candidates		14,866	1.46	-0.48
Independent American	Ed Bridges	9,918	0.97	−0.07
Total votes		1,019,071	100.00	
Turnout		1,023,617	54.58	
Registered electors		1,875,578		
Republican gain from Democratic				

=== By county ===
County	Steve Sisolak Democratic		Joe Lombardo Republican		Various candidates Other parties		Margin		Total votes
County	#	%	#	%	#	%	#	%	Total votes
Carson City	9,822	41.50	12,721	53.75	1,122	4.74	2,899	12.25	23,665
Churchill	2,223	22.53	7,020	71.16	622	6.31	4,797	48.63	9,865
Clark	347,397	51.06	308,760	45.38	24,198	3.56	-38,637	-5.68	680,355
Douglas	9,014	30.92	19,070	65.41	1,070	3.67	10,056	34.49	29,154
Elko	2,923	18.06	12,173	75.22	1,087	6.72	9,250	57.16	16,183
Esmeralda	64	14.13	338	74.61	51	11.26	274	60.49	453
Eureka	61	7.80	681	87.08	40	5.12	620	79.28	782
Humboldt	1,201	19.66	4,488	73.47	420	6.88	3,287	53.81	6,109
Lander	316	14.31	1,678	76.00	214	9.69	1,362	61.68	2,208
Lincoln	264	12.22	1,710	79.17	186	8.61	1,446	66.94	2,160
Lyon	5,960	25.25	16,338	69.23	1,303	5.52	10,378	43.97	23,601
Mineral	613	32.38	1,138	60.12	142	7.50	525	27.73	1,893
Nye	5,813	27.93	13,824	66.41	1,178	5.66	8,011	38.49	20,815
Pershing	384	21.65	1,286	72.49	104	5.86	902	50.85	1,774
Storey	678	26.46	1,748	68.23	136	5.31	1,070	41.76	2,562
Washoe	94,646	48.78	91,862	47.34	7,534	3.88	-2,784	-1.43	194,042
White Pine	612	17.74	2,542	73.68	296	8.58	1,930	55.94	3,450
Totals	481,991	47.30	497,377	48.81	39,703	3.90	15,386	1.51	1,019,071

=== By congressional district ===
District	Sisolak	Lombardo	Representative
1st	50.6%	45.6%	Dina Titus
2nd	40.8%	54.7%	Mark Amodei
3rd	50.4%	46.5%	Susie Lee
4th	49.5%	46.3%	Steven Horsford

== Exit poll ==
2022 Nevada gubernatorial election voter demographics (CNN)
Demographic subgroup	Lombardo	Sisolak	% of total vote
Ideology
Liberals	4	96	23
Moderates	42	54	42
Conservatives	88	10	35
Party
Democrats	3	96	34
Republicans	93	5	36
Independents	49	46	30
Joe Biden approval rating
Approve	6	93	45
Disapprove	86	11	54
Most important issue to your vote
Inflation	71	26	36
Abortion	11	87	28
Crime	54	45	11
Immigration	82	17	11
Gun policy	N/A	N/A	6
2020 presidential vote
Joe Biden	6	92	45
Donald Trump	95	4	44
Did not vote	N/A	N/A	7
Another candidate	N/A	N/A	3
Gender
Men	54	44	46
Women	46	51	54
Race
White	58	39	67
Latino	37	62	13
Black	15	83	11
Asian	46	54	4
Other	43	47	5
Race by gender
White men	61	37	32
White women	56	41	35
Black men	25	72	4
Black women	8	90	7
Latino men	37	61	6
Latina women	38	61	7
Other	44	50	9
Age
18–29	34	64	12
30–44	37	60	21
45–64	58	39	36
65 or older	56	42	32
Area type
Urban	47	51	73
Suburban	46	50	15
Rural	71	27	12
Education
College graduate	46	53	36
No college degree	52	45	64
Education by race
White college graduates	50	48	26
Whites without college	63	34	41
Non-white college graduates	34	64	10
Non-whites without college	31	66	23
Education by race and gender
White women with college degrees	43	54	12
White women without college degrees	63	34	23
White men with college degrees	57	42	14
White men without college degrees	64	34	18
Voters of color	32	65	33
Educational attainment
Never attended college	52	44	16
Some college	50	48	31
Associate's degree	55	42	18
Bachelor's degree	46	52	21
Advanced degree	45	54	15

== See also ==
- 2022 United States elections
- 2022 Nevada elections
- 2022 United States Senate election in Nevada

== Notes ==
Partisan clients
