= Julie Pazina =

American politician

Member of the Nevada Senate from the 12th district
- Incumbent
- Assumed office November 9, 2022
- Preceded by: Keith Pickard (Redistricting)

Personal details
- Born: Kansas City, Missouri
- Party: Democratic
- Education: Vanderbilt University (BS)

Julie Pazina is an American politician who has served as a Democratic member of the Nevada Senate since 2022, representing District 12 in Clark County.

== Early life and education ==
Pazina grew up in Atlanta, Georgia, where she lived until her family moved to Las Vegas in 2002. Her mother worked at The Atlanta Journal Constitution as an editor.

She began campaigning for local political candidates at age 11, helping with phone banking and door-to-door outreach.

She pursued her education at Vanderbilt University, where she was a double major in political science and communication studies and earned a Bachelor of Science.

== Career ==
After graduation, she worked in the advertising industry, and in 2002 she moved to Las Vegas while working as assistant cruise director and a port cruise consultant. Upon her move to Las Vegas, she embarked upon Edlen Electrical Exhibition Services and is the company's vice president of business development and oversees sales that take place within the Las Vegas market and around the country. The Edlen company is family-owned and is the largest independent utility contractor for conventions, special events, and trade shows.

In 2011, she received the Young Professionals of the Year award from the International Association of Exhibitions and Events. Additionally, in 2013 she received tenure as the president of the Las Vegas Hospitality Association, in which she worked for six years prior to receiving her tenure. In 2019 the International Association of Exhibitions and Events dubbed her with yet another award, this time with the Woman Of Achievement title.

=== Political career ===
In 2018, Pazina ran for Senate District 20, losing by 24 votes.

In response to the COVID-19 pandemic, Pazina was appointed by the governor to the Commission on Tourism and the Commission's Covid-19 Recovery Committee.

In 2022, former Senator Joe Hardy termed out, and a seat was opened in which Pazina ran as a Democrat against Republican Cherlyn Arrington, and took the victory with 52.5% of the vote to Cherlyn Arrington's 47.5%. As senator, she chairs the Senate Committee on Natural Resources and serves on both the Commerce and Labor and Growth and Infrastructure committees.

== Personal life ==
Pazina is married to her husband Joel and has two Golden Retrievers.
