= Randolph Townsend =

American politician (born 1947)

Member of the Nevada Senate from the Washoe 4th district
- In office 1982–2010
- Succeeded by: Ben Kieckhefer

Personal details
- Born: January 24, 1947 (age 79) Los Angeles, California, U.S.
- Party: Republican
- Spouse: Robyne Townsend

Randolph Townsend (born January 24, 1947) is an American Republican politician from Nevada. From 1982 to 2010, he served as a member of the Nevada Senate, representing Washoe County District 4 (map). He served from 2010 to 2014 as a member of the Nevada Gaming Commission.

In 2002, President George W. Bush appointed Townsend to the New Freedom Commission on Mental Health. He also chaired the Nevada Subcommittee to Study Mental Health Issues. In 2003, he introduced a bill creating the Nevada Mental Health Plan Implementation Commission and was elected its chairman.

Townsend holds Bachelor's and master's degrees in Education from the University of Nevada, Reno.
