= Nevada's 12th Senate district =

American legislative district

Nevada's 12th State Senate district
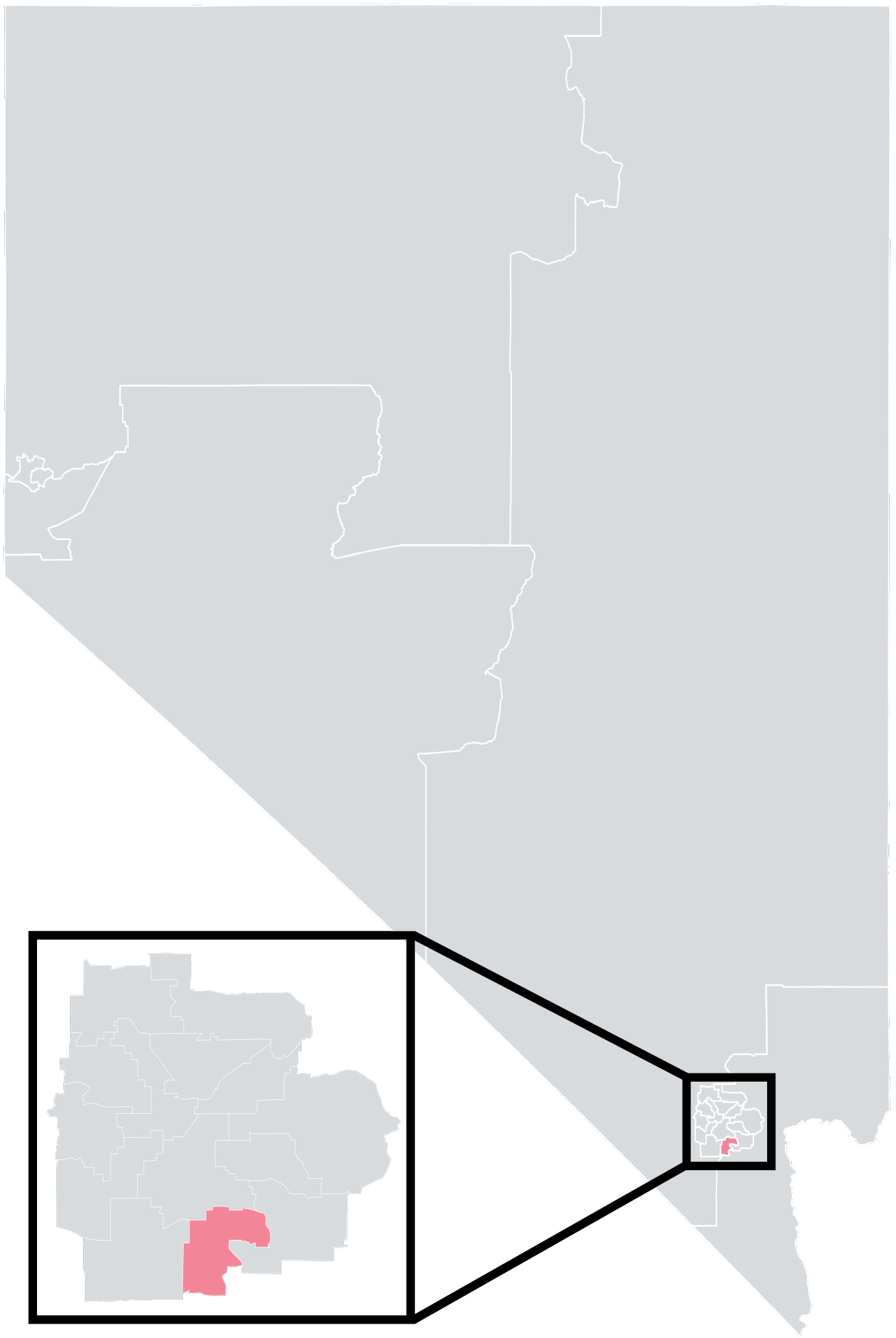
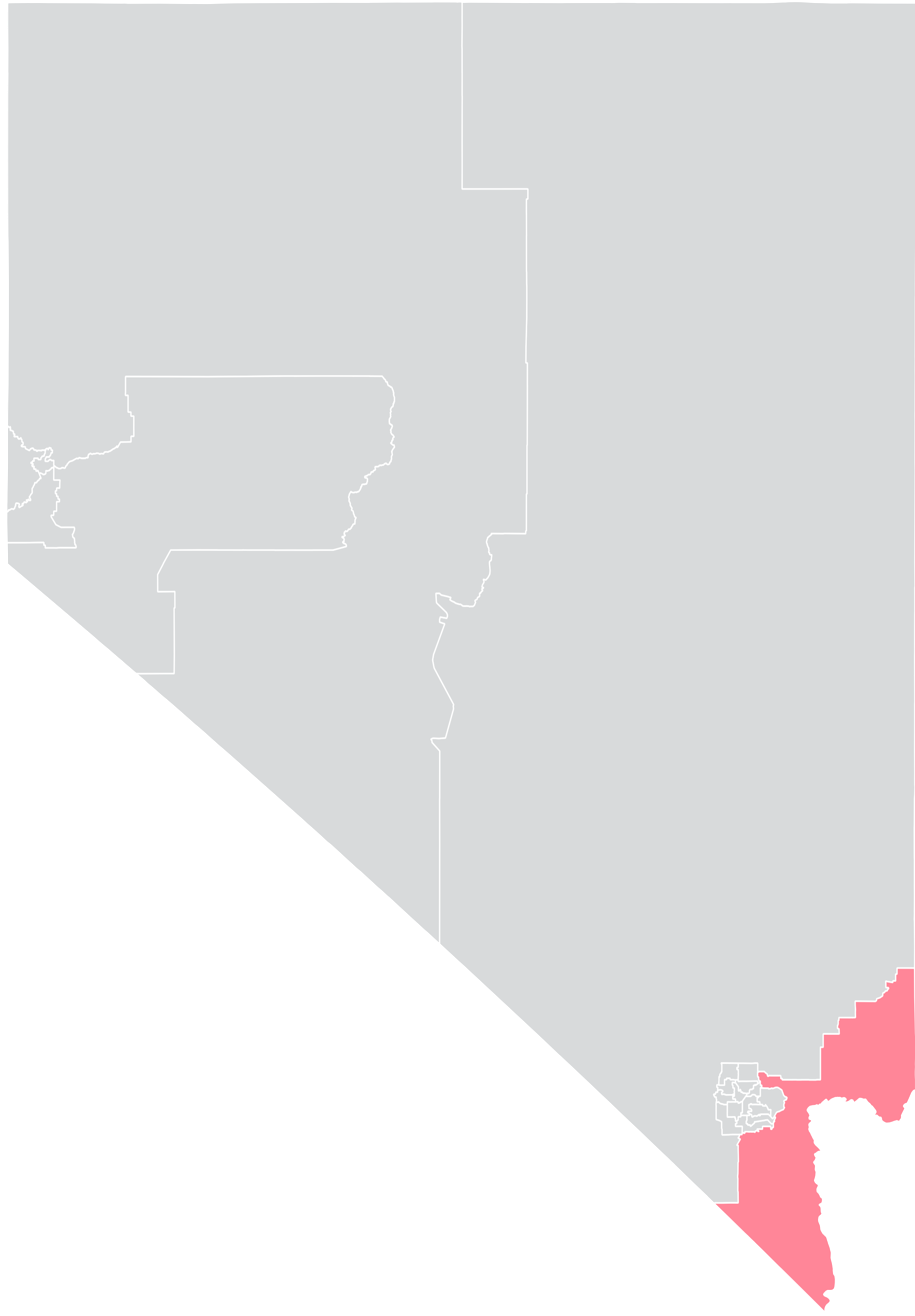
Senator
Julie Pazina; D–Las Vegas
- Registration: 42.0% Republican; 36.1% Democratic; 16.1% No party preference
- Demographics: 70% White; 5% Black; 16% Hispanic; 5% Asian; 3% Other
- Population (2018): 144,105
- Registered voters: 76,051

Nevada's 12th Senate district is one of 21 districts in the Nevada Senate. It has been represented by Democrat Julie Pazina since 2022, succeeding Republican Joe Hardy.

== Geography ==
District 12 covers the southern and eastern exurbs of Las Vegas in Clark County, including Mesquite, Bunkerville, Moapa Valley, Boulder City, Laughlin, and parts of Henderson and the Fort Mojave Indian Reservation. The district is home to the Hoover Dam.

The district overlaps with Nevada's 3rd and 4th congressional districts, and with the 19th and 23rd districts of the Nevada Assembly. It borders the states of Arizona and California.

== Recent election results ==
Nevada Senators are elected to staggered four-year terms; since 2012 redistricting, the 12th district has held elections in midterm years.

=== 2022 ===
2022 Nevada State Senate election, District 12
Party	Candidate	Votes	%
Democratic	Julie Pazina	26,609	52.5
Republican	Cherlyn Arrington	24,104	47.5
Total votes		50,713	100

== Historical election results ==
=== 2018 ===
2018 Nevada State Senate election, District 12
Party	Candidate	Votes	%
Republican	Joe Hardy (incumbent)	37,193	61.7
Democratic	Craig Jordahl	23,133	38.3
Total votes		60,326	100
Republican hold			

=== 2014 ===
2014 Nevada State Senate election, District 12
Party	Candidate	Votes	%
Republican	Joe Hardy (incumbent)	28,657	100
Total votes		28,657	100
Republican hold			

=== Federal and statewide results ===
Year	Office	Results
2020	President	Trump 57.96 – 40.13%
2018	Senate	Heller 55.6 – 40.4%
2018	Governor	Laxalt 55.2 – 39.5%
2016	President	Trump 57.4 – 37.0%
2012	President	Romney 57.0 – 41.3%
2012	Senate	Heller 54.9 – 36.8%
