= Don Tatro =

American businessman and politician

Member of the Nevada Senate from the 16th district
- In office November 10, 2021 – November 9, 2022
- Preceded by: Ben Kieckhefer
- Succeeded by: Lisa Krasner

Personal details
- Born: Carson City, Nevada, U.S.
- Party: Republican
- Children: 2
- Education: University of Phoenix (BS)

Don Tatro is an American businessman and politician who served as a member of the Nevada Senate for the 16th district. Tatro was appointed to the role in November 2021, succeeding Ben Kieckhefer. Tatro is the Director of State and Local Policy at Redwood Materials.

== Early life and education ==
Tatro was born and raised in Carson City, Nevada. He earned a Bachelor of Science degree in business management from the University of Phoenix.

== Career ==
Tatro has served as a press secretary for Senator John Ensign and Tom Coburn. From February 2015 to November 2020, he was the executive director of the Builders Association of Northern Nevada, tasked with lobbying the Nevada Legislature. Tatro is the Director of State and Local Policy at Redwood Materials.

Tatro was appointed to the Nevada Senate in November 2021. In February 2022, he announced that he would seek a full term in the Nevada Senate in the November election. In the June 2022 Republican primary, Tatro was defeated by Assemblywoman Lisa Krasner.
