= Lisa Krasner =

American politician

Member of the Nevada Senate from the 16th district
- Incumbent
- Assumed office November 9, 2022
- Preceded by: Don Tatro

Member of the Nevada Assembly from the 26th district
- In office November 9, 2016 – November 9, 2022
- Preceded by: Randy Kirner
- Succeeded by: Rich DeLong

Personal details
- Born: California, U.S.
- Party: Republican
- Spouse: Charles Krasner
- Children: 2
- Education: University of California, Los Angeles; University of La Verne College of Law

Lisa Krasner is an American politician and academic who serves as Republican member of the Nevada Senate. Krasner represents the 16th district, which covers Storey County, Carson City, and parts of Washoe County.

== Early life and education ==
Krasner was born in California. She received a Bachelor's degree from the University of California, Los Angeles and a Juris Doctor degree from the University of La Verne College of Law.

She is an adjunct professor at Truckee Meadows Community College where she teaches in the political science department. Prior to that she taught courses at the University of Phoenix for six years. Krasner served as a Commissioner for the State of Nevada Commission on Aging for senior citizens for three years. She was appointed by Governor Sandoval. Prior to that Krasner served as a Commissioner on the City of Reno Recreation and Parks Commission for seven years. She served on the Board of the State of Nevada PTA. She also served as President of the Reno Philharmonic Guild.

== Nevada Assembly ==
Krasner first ran for the Nevada Assembly in 2014 against incumbent Randy Kirner. While she finished second in the Republican primary, she advanced to the general election because no Democratic or Independent American candidates declared and no primary candidate received more than 50% of the vote. In the general election, Krasner lost by a mere 11 votes.

In 2015, Krasner announced she would again run for the Nevada State Assembly. She won the Republican primary and ran unopposed in the general election. She assumed office as the Assemblywoman for Nevada State Assembly District 26 on November 9, 2016.

== Nevada Senate ==
Krasner announced that she would run for Nevada State Senate District 16 in August 2021. Krasner won the June 2022 Primary Election. Krasner went on to win the November 2022 General Election, assuming office as the Senator for Nevada Senate District 16 on November 9, 2022.

Krasner served as the Senator for Nevada Senate District 16 in the 2023 Nevada Legislative Session, and in the 2025 Nevada Legislative Session.

== Political positions ==
Krasner is a Republican. In the 2017 Nevada Legislative session Krasner successfully passed AB145- Extends the statute of limitations for child victims of sexual abuse. The Bill was signed into law by Governor Sandoval in May 2017. Krasner received an "A" rating from the NRA Political Victory Fund.

== Legislative history ==
=== Healthcare ===
During the 2025 legislative session, Krasner one of five Senate Republicans to oppose Senate Bill 217, which would have required most private and public insurers, including Medicaid, to cover in vitro fertilization treatments. Krasner also voted against Assembly Bill 282, which would have mandated that healthcare providers issue refunds within 60 days for patient billing overpayments, and Assembly Bill 259, which proposed adopting prescription drug prices negotiated by Medicare. She also opposed Senate Bill 182, aimed at establishing mandatory nurse-to-patient staffing ratios in hospitals in Washoe and Clark counties, and Senate Bill 128, which sought to prohibit insurers from solely relying on artificial intelligence tools to deny or modify prior authorization requests.

=== Education ===
In 2019, Krasner voted in favor of Senate Bill 551, which allocated additional funding to public school districts. Throughout her legislative career, Krasner has consistently supported school choice policies, including the expansion of Opportunity Scholarships and charter schools, while opposing measures aimed at expanding public oversight of state-funded private education programs.

During the 2025 legislative session, Krasner voted against several high-profile education bills introduced by the Democratic majority. She opposed Assembly Bill 416 and Assembly Bill 445, which aimed to expand legal protections for librarians and limit the removal of challenged books from school and public libraries. The bills were introduced in response to an increase in book challenges, particularly those targeting materials related to race, gender identity, and sexual orientation. She also voted against Assembly Bill 205, which would have transitioned sex education to an opt-out model, thereby making instruction available to all students unless parents declined participation. In addition, she opposed Assembly Bill 441, which proposed new oversight and reporting standards for the Opportunity Scholarship program serving low-income students.

== Electoral history ==
Nevada Assembly District 26 Republican primary, 2014
Party	Candidate	Votes	%
Republican	Randy Kirner	2,546	42.0%
Republican	Lisa Krasner	2,029	34.0%
Republican	Robert Archie	1,484	24.0%
Total votes		6,059	100.0%

Nevada Assembly District 26 general election, 2014
Party	Candidate	Votes	%
Republican	Randy Kirner	10,331	50.01%
Republican	Lisa Krasner	10,320	49.99%
Total votes		20,651	100.0%

Nevada Assembly District 26 Republican primary, 2016
Party	Candidate	Votes	%
Republican	Lisa Krasner	3,448	55.3%
Republican	Jason Guinasso	2,784	44.7%
Total votes		6,232	100.0%

Nevada Assembly District 26 general election, 2016
Party	Candidate	Votes	%
Republican	Lisa Krasner	30,682	100.0%
Total votes		30,682	100.0%

Nevada Assembly District 26 general election, 2018
Party	Candidate	Votes	%
Republican	Lisa Krasner (incumbent)	20,951	57.3%
Democratic	June Joseph	15,581	42.7%
Total votes		36,532	100.0%

Nevada Assembly District 26 general election, 2020
Party	Candidate	Votes	%
Republican	Lisa Krasner (incumbent)	28,428	59.2%
Democratic	Vance Alm	19,588	40.8%
Total votes		48,016	100.0%

Nevada State Senate District 16 Republican primary, 2022
Party	Candidate	Votes	%
Republican	Lisa Krasner	7,193	33.5%
Republican	Don Tatro (incumbent)	5,903	27.5%
Republican	Monica Stabbert	4,618	21.5%
Republican	Timothy Duvall	3,769	17.5%
Total votes		21,483	100.0%

Nevada State Senate District 16 general election, 2022
Party	Candidate	Votes	%
Republican	Lisa Krasner	42,871	60.3%
Democratic	Aaron Sims	28,172	39.7%
Total votes		71,043	100.0%

== Personal life ==
Krasner and her husband, Charles, a doctor, have two adult sons.
