= Nevada's 16th Senate district =

American legislative district

Nevada's 16th State Senate district
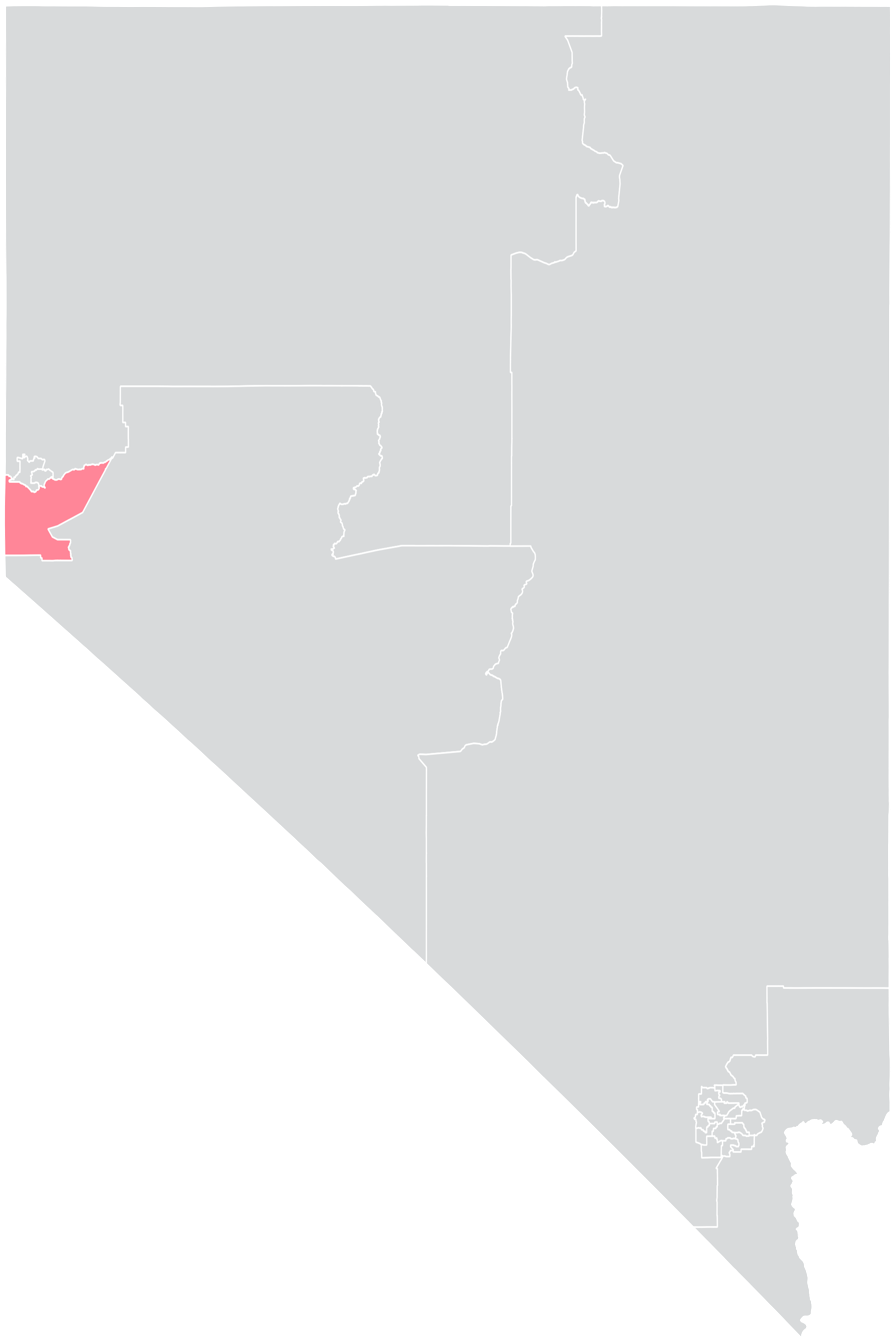
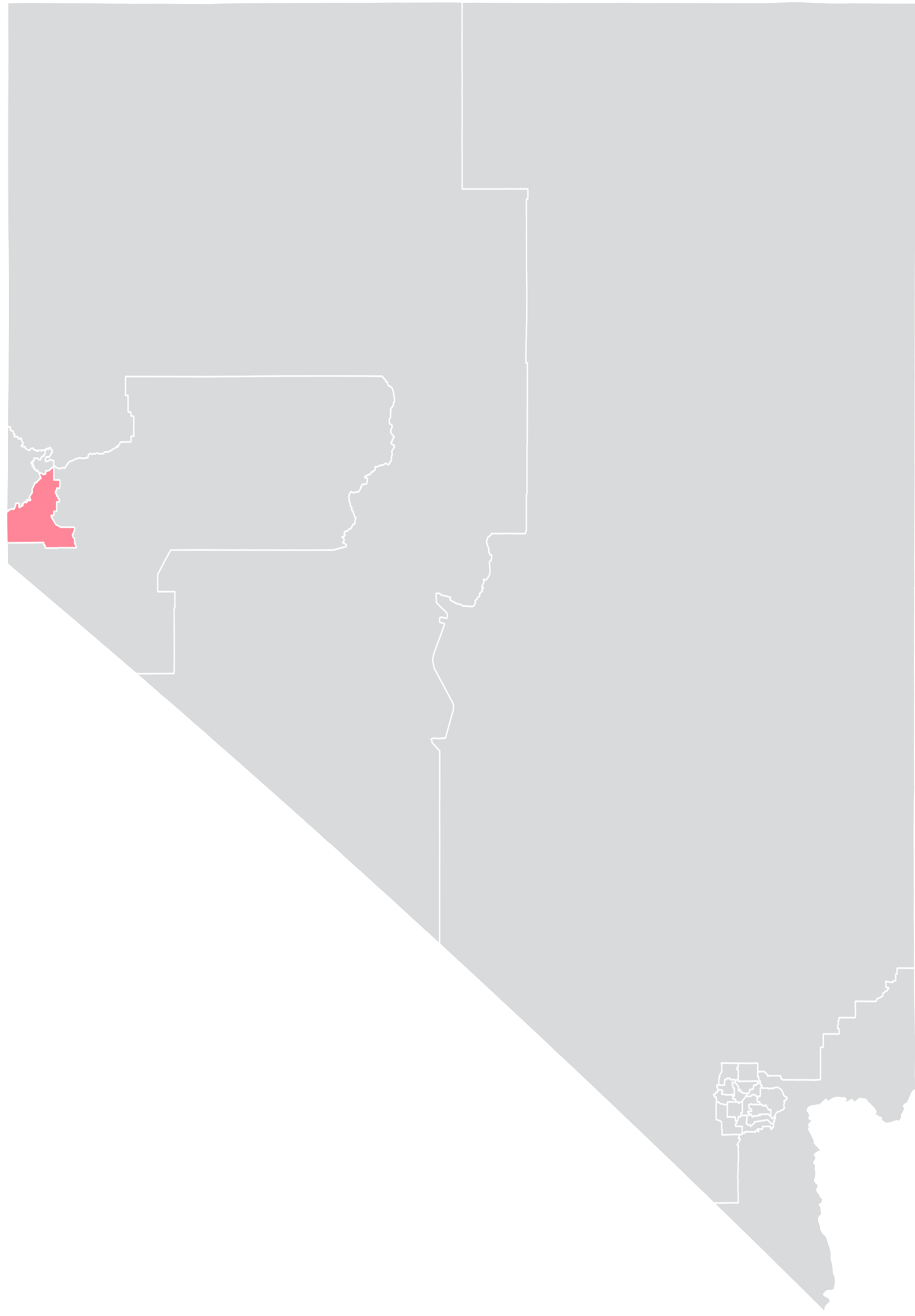
Senator
Lisa Krasner; R–Reno
- Registration: 45.9% Republican; 33.3% Democratic; 14.8% No party preference
- Demographics: 72% White; 1% Black; 19% Hispanic; 4% Asian; 1% Native American; 2% Other
- Population (2018): 133,533
- Registered voters: 77,375

Nevada's 16th Senate district is one of 21 districts in the Nevada Senate. It has been represented by Republican Lisa Krasner since 2022, succeeding fellow Republican Don Tatro who was appointed to succeed Republican Ben Kieckhefer but lost to Krasner in the Republican primary.

== Geography ==
District 16 is based in the independent city of Carson City and southern Washoe County, covering Incline Village, Washoe Valley, and parts of Reno and Sparks.

The district is located entirely within Nevada's 2nd congressional district, and overlaps with the 26th and 40th districts of the Nevada Assembly. It borders the state of California.

== Recent election results ==
Nevada Senators are elected to staggered four-year terms; since 2012 redistricting, the 16th district has held elections in midterm years.

=== 2022 ===
2022 Nevada State Senate election, District 16
Primary election
Party	Candidate	Votes	%
Republican	Lisa Krasner	7,193	33.5
Republican	Don Tatro (incumbent)	5,903	27.5
Republican	Monica Stabbert	4,618	21.5
Republican	Timothy Duvall	3,769	17.5
Total votes		21,483	100
General election
Republican	Lisa Krasner	42,871	60.3
Democratic	Aaron Sims	28,172	39.7
Total votes		71,043	100
Republican hold			

== Historical election results ==
=== 2018 ===
2018 Nevada State Senate election, District 16
Primary election
Party	Candidate	Votes	%
Republican	Ben Kieckhefer (incumbent)	7,319	56.2
Republican	Gary Schmidt	5,698	43.8
Total votes		13,017	100
General election
Republican	Ben Kieckhefer (incumbent)	36,317	55.7
Democratic	Tina Davis-Hersey	26,674	40.9
Independent American	John Wagner	2,219	3.4
Total votes		65,210	100
Republican hold			

=== 2014 ===
2014 Nevada State Senate election, District 16
Primary election
Party	Candidate	Votes	%
Republican	Ben Kieckhefer (incumbent)	8,144	66.7
Republican	Gary Schmidt	4,060	33.3
Total votes		12,204	100
General election
Republican	Ben Kieckhefer (incumbent)	27,225	64.9
Democratic	Michael Kelley	12,021	28.7
Independent American	John Everhart	2,691	6.4
Total votes		41,937	100
Republican hold			

=== Federal and statewide results ===
Year	Office	Results
2020	President	Trump 52.1 – 45.1%
2018	Senate	Heller 53.7 – 42.8%
2018	Governor	Laxalt 53.2 – 42.3%
2016	President	Trump 51.3 – 40.1%
2012	President	Romney 54.9 – 43.0%
2012	Senate	Heller 58.8 – 32.9%
