= Joe Hardy (politician) =

American politician from Nevada

Mayor of Boulder City
- Incumbent
- Assumed office November 29, 2022
- Preceded by: Kiernan McManus

President pro tempore of the Nevada Senate
- In office January 2015 – November 9, 2016
- Preceded by: David Parks
- Succeeded by: Mo Denis

Member of the Nevada Senate from the 12th district
- In office November 3, 2010 – November 9, 2022
- Preceded by: Stan Olsen
- Succeeded by: Jeff Stone (Redistricting)

Member of the Nevada Assembly from the 20th district
- In office November 6, 2002 – November 3, 2010
- Preceded by: Kathy Von Tobel
- Succeeded by: Cresent Hardy

Personal details
- Born: Joseph Paul Hardy; May 15, 1949 (age 77) Reno, Nevada, U.S.
- Party: Republican
- Spouse: Jill Sweningsen
- Children: 8
- Education: University of Nevada, Reno; Washington University in St. Louis (M.D.)

Military service
- Allegiance: United States
- Branch/service: United States Air Force
- Rank: Major

Joseph Paul Hardy (born May 15, 1949) is a former Republican member of the Nevada Senate, representing District 12. Hardy was first elected to the Senate in 2010 when, before redistricting and a change in the nomenclature of the districts, he represented Clark County Number 12. His district represents rural areas of southeast Clark County including the communities of Boulder City, Laughlin, Searchlight, Henderson, Overton, Bunkerville, Mesquite, as well as Nellis Air Force Base, Lake Mead, and Valley of Fire State Park. Hardy previously represented Clark County District 20 from 2002 to 2010.

He served a LDS mission in France. Hardy is currently an Associate Professor and Staff Physician in the Department of Primary Care at Touro University Nevada College of Osteopathic Medicine.
