= Ben Kieckhefer =

American politician

Chief of Staff to the Governor of Nevada
- In office January 2, 2023 – January 17, 2024
- Governor: Joe Lombardo
- Preceded by: Yvanna Cancela
- Succeeded by: Ryan Cherry

Member of the Nevada Gaming Commission
- In office October 11, 2021 – January 2, 2023
- Appointed by: Steve Sisolak
- Preceded by: Deborah Fuetsch
- Succeeded by: Brian Krolicki

Member of the Nevada Senate from the 16th district
- In office November 3, 2010 – October 7, 2021
- Preceded by: Randolph Townsend
- Succeeded by: Don Tatro

Personal details
- Born: Benjamin Robert Kieckhefer; February 2, 1977 (age 49) Springfield, Illinois, U.S.
- Party: Republican
- Spouse: April West (m. 2005)
- Children: 4
- Education: DePaul University (B.A.); University of Illinois Springfield (M.A.)
- Website: www.brknevada.com

Benjamin Robert Kieckhefer (born February 2, 1977) is an American politician who had served as the chief of staff to Nevada governor Joe Lombardo from 2023 to 2024. A member of the Republican Party, Kieckhefer previously served as a member of the Nevada Gaming Commission from 2021 to 2023 and as a member of the Nevada Senate from the 16th district from 2010 to 2021.

Born and raised in Springfield, Illinois, Kieckhefer holds degrees from DePaul University and the University of Illinois Springfield. After college, he worked as a journalist covering the Nevada Legislature for the Associated Press and the Reno Gazette-Journal. He served as communications director for Nevada governor Jim Gibbons and as the public information officer for the Nevada Department of Health and Human Services. He was also director of client relations for McDonald Carano, a Reno-based law firm.

In 2010, Kieckhefer was elected to the Nevada Senate. During his time in the state senate, Kieckhefer served as assistant Republican leader from 2013 to 2018. He resigned in 2021 after Steve Sisolak appointed him to the Nevada Gaming Commission.

After Lombardo defeated Sisolak in 2022, Kieckhefer was named as Lombardo's chief of staff. He resigned from the Nevada Gaming Commission to accept the appointment and was succeeded by former lieutenant governor Brian Krolicki.

Kieckhefer lives in Reno, Nevada with his wife and four children.
