= 2018 United States attorney general elections =

- November 6, 2018

33 attorney general offices 30 states; 2 territories; 1 federal district (Note: Seat tallies and popular vote do not include states that do not elect attorneys general or territorial attorneys general.)
	Majority party	Minority party
Party	Democratic	Republican
Seats before	19	24
Seats after	23	20
Seat change	▲4	▼4
Popular vote	42,211,310	36,161,300
Percentage	52.75%	45.19%
Seats up	12	18
Seats won	16	14
- Democratic hold Republican hold Democratic gain Independent gain No election

The 2018 United States attorney general elections were held on November 6, 2018, in 30 states, 2 territories, and the District of Columbia. The previous attorney general elections for this group of states took place in 2014, except in Vermont where attorneys general serve only two-year terms and elected their current attorney general in 2016.

The elections took place concurrently with elections to the House of Representatives and Senate, and numerous state and local elections including governorships.

Democrats gained four elected attorney general offices, while Republicans gained zero offices. This caused Democratic attorneys general to constitute a majority of elected attorneys general in U.S. states, the last time this has happened as of 2025.

== Election predictions ==
Several sites and individuals published predictions of competitive seats. These predictions looked at factors such as the strength of the incumbent (if the incumbent is running for re-election), the strength of the candidates, and the partisan leanings of the state. The predictions assigned ratings to each seat, with the rating indicating the predicted advantage that a party has in winning that seat.

Most election predictors used:

- "tossup": no advantage
- "tilt" (used by some predictors): advantage that is not quite as strong as "lean"
- "lean": slight advantage
- "likely": significant, but surmountable, advantage
- "safe": near-certain chance of victory

State	Incumbent	Governing Oct. 26, 2018	Result
Alabama	Steve Marshall	Safe R	Steve Marshall
Arizona	Mark Brnovich	Lean R	Mark Brnovich
Arkansas	Leslie Rutledge	Safe R	Leslie Rutledge
California	Xavier Becerra	Safe D	Xavier Becerra
Colorado	Cynthia Coffman	Tossup	Phil Weiser
Connecticut	George Jepsen	Lean D	William Tong
Delaware	Matthew Denn	Likely D	Kathy Jennings
Florida	Pam Bondi	Tossup	Ashley Moody
Georgia	Chris Carr	Lean R	Chris Carr
Idaho	Lawrence Wasden	Safe R	Lawrence Wasden
Illinois	Lisa Madigan	Lean D	Kwame Raoul
Iowa	Tom Miller	Safe D	Tom Miller
Kansas	Derek Schmidt	Safe R	Derek Schmidt
Maryland	Brian Frosh	Likely D	Brian Frosh
Massachusetts	Maura Healey	Safe D	Maura Healey
Michigan	Bill Schuette	Tossup	Dana Nessel
Minnesota	Lori Swanson	Tossup	Keith Ellison
Nebraska	Doug Peterson	Safe R	Doug Peterson
Nevada	Adam Laxalt	Tossup	Aaron Ford
New Mexico	Hector Balderas	Safe D	Hector Balderas
New York	Barbara Underwood	Likely D	Letitia James
North Dakota	Wayne Stenehjem	Safe R	Wayne Stenehjem
Ohio	Mike DeWine	Tossup	Dave Yost
Oklahoma	Michael J. Hunter	Safe R	Michael J. Hunter
Rhode Island	Peter Kilmartin	Safe D	Peter Neronha
South Carolina	Alan Wilson	Lean R	Alan Wilson
South Dakota	Marty Jackley	Safe R	Jason Ravnsborg
Texas	Ken Paxton	Safe R	Ken Paxton
Vermont	T.J. Donovan	Safe D	T.J. Donovan
Wisconsin	Brad Schimel	Tossup	Josh Kaul

== Race summary ==
=== States ===
State	Attorney General	Party	First elected	Status	Candidates
Alabama	Steve Marshall	Republican	2017 (Note: Marshall took office in 2017 after his predecessor (Luther Strange) resigned. He was subsequently elected in the 2018 Alabama Attorney General election.)	Incumbent re-elected.	▌ ✓ Steve Marshall (Republican) 58.8%; ▌Joseph Siegelman (Democratic) 41.1%
Arizona	Mark Brnovich	Republican	2014	Incumbent re-elected.	▌ Mark Brnovich (Republican) 51.7%; ▌ ✓ January Contreras (Democratic) 48.3%
Arkansas	Leslie Rutledge	Republican	2014	Incumbent re-elected.	▌ ✓ Leslie Rutledge (Republican) 61.8%; ▌Mike Lee (Democratic) 35.4%
California	Xavier Becerra	Democratic	2017 (Note: Bonta took office after his predecessor resigned.)	Interim appointee elected.	▌ ✓ Xavier Becerra (Democratic) 63.6%; ▌ Steven Bailey (Republican) 36.4%
Colorado	Cynthia Coffman	Republican	2014	Incumbent retired. New attorney general elected. Democratic gain.	▌ ✓ Phil Weiser (Democratic) 51.6%; ▌George Brauchler (Republican) 45.1%; ▌William Robinson III (Libertarian) 3.3%
Connecticut	George Jepsen	Democratic	2010	Incumbent retired. New attorney general elected. Democratic hold.	▌ ✓ William Tong (Democratic) 52.5%; ▌Susan Hatfield (Republican) 46.5%
Delaware	Matthew Denn	Democratic	2014	Incumbent retired. New attorney general elected. Democratic hold.	▌ ✓ Kathy Jennings (Democratic) 61.31%; ▌Bernard Pepukayi (Republican) 38.68%
Florida	Pam Bondi	Republican	2010	Incumbent term-limited. New attorney general elected. Republican hold.	▌ ✓ Ashley Moody (Republican) 52.1%; ▌Sean Shaw (Democratic) 46.1%
Georgia	Chris Carr	Republican	2016 (Note: Carr took office in 2016 after his predecessor (Sam Olens) resigned.)	Incumbent elected to the full term.	▌ ✓ Chris Carr (Republican) 51.3%; ▌ Charlie Bailey (Democratic) 48.7%
Idaho	Lawrence Wasden	Republican	2002	Incumbent re-elected.	▌ ✓ Lawrence Wasden (Republican) 65.4%; ▌Bruce Bistline (Democratic) 34.6%
Illinois	Lisa Madigan	Democratic	2002	Incumbent retired. New attorney general elected. Democratic hold.	▌ ✓ Kwame Raoul (Democratic) 54.71%; ▌Erika Harold (Republican) 42.74%; ▌Bubba Harsy (Libertarian) 2.55%
Iowa	Tom Miller	Democratic	1978; 1990 (retired); 1994	Incumbent re-elected.	▌ ✓ Tom Miller (Democratic) 76.51%; ▌Marco Battaglia (Libertarian) 22.78%
Kansas	Derek Schmidt	Republican	2010	Incumbent re-elected.	▌ ✓ Derek Schmidt (Republican) 58.98%; ▌Sarah Swain (Democratic) 41.02%
Maryland	Brian Frosh	Democratic	2014	Incumbent re-elected.	▌ ✓ Brian Frosh (Democratic) 64.8%; ▌Craig Wolf (Republican) 35.1%
Massachusetts	Maura Healey	Democratic	2014	Incumbent re-elected.	▌ ✓ Maura Healey (Democratic) 69.91%; ▌James McMahon (Republican) 30.02%
Michigan	Bill Schuette	Republican	2010	Incumbent term-limited. New attorney general elected. Democratic gain.	▌ ✓ Dana Nessel (Democratic) 49.04%; ▌Tom Leonard (Republican) 46.26%; ▌Lisa Lane Giola (Libertarian) 2.1%
Minnesota	Lori Swanson	DFL	2006	Incumbent retired. New attorney general elected. Democratic hold.	▌ ✓ Keith Ellison (DFL) 48.96%; ▌ Doug Wardlow (Republican) 45.08%
Nebraska	Doug Peterson	Republican	2014	Incumbent re-elected.	▌ ✓ Doug Peterson (Republican) 100%
Nevada	Adam Laxalt	Republican	2014	Incumbent retired. New attorney general elected. Democratic gain.	▌ ✓ Aaron Ford (Democratic) 47.2%; ▌Wesley Duncan (Republican) 46.8%; ▌None of These Candidates 2.7%
New Mexico	Hector Balderas	Democratic	2014	Incumbent re-elected.	▌ ✓ Hector Balderas (Democratic) 61.8%; ▌Michael Hendricks (Republican) 33.4%
New York	Barbara Underwood	Democratic	2018 (Note: Underwood took office after her predecessor resigned.)	Incumbent retired. New attorney general elected. Democratic hold.	▌ ✓ Letitia James (Democratic) 62.42%; ▌Keith Wofford (Republican) 35.2%
North Dakota	Wayne Stenehjem	Republican	2000	Incumbent re-elected.	▌ ✓ Wayne Stenehjem (Republican) 67.55%; ▌David Clark Thompson (Democratic–NPL) 32.23%
Ohio	Mike DeWine	Republican	2010	Incumbent retired. New attorney general elected. Republican hold.	▌ ✓ Dave Yost (Republican) 52.2%; ▌Steve Dettelbach (Democratic) 47.8%
Oklahoma	Michael J. Hunter	Republican	2016 (Note: Hunter took office after his predecessor resigned.)	Incumbent elected to the full term.	▌ ✓ Michael J. Hunter (Republican) 64.03%; ▌Mark Myles (Democratic) 35.97%
Rhode Island	Peter Kilmartin	Democratic	2010	Incumbent retired. New attorney general elected. Democratic hold.	▌ ✓ Peter Neronha (Democratic) 79.8%; ▌Alan Gordon (Compassion) 19.1%
South Carolina	Alan Wilson	Republican	2010	Incumbent re-elected.	▌ ✓ Alan Wilson (Republican) 55.1%; ▌Constance Anastopoulo (Democratic) 44.9%
South Dakota	Marty Jackley	Republican	2009 (Note: Jackley took office after his predecessor resigned.)	Incumbent retired. New attorney general elected. Republican hold.	▌ ✓ Jason Ravnsborg (Republican) 55.16%; ▌Randy Seiler (Democratic) 44.84%
Texas	Ken Paxton	Republican	2014	Incumbent re-elected.	▌ ✓ Ken Paxton (Republican) 50.57%; ▌ Justin Nelson (Democratic) 47.01%; ▌Michael Ray Harris (Libertarian) 2.43%
Vermont	T.J. Donovan	Democratic	2016	Incumbent re-elected.	▌ ✓ T.J. Donovan (Democratic) 67.24%; ▌Janssen Willhoit (Republican) 25.24%
Wisconsin	Brad Schimel	Republican	2014	Incumbent lost re-election. New attorney general elected. Democratic gain.	▌ ✓ Josh Kaul (Democratic) 49.4%; ▌Brad Schimel (Republican) 48.8%

=== Territories and federal district ===
State	Attorney General	Party	First elected	Status	Candidates
District of Columbia	Karl Racine	Democratic	2014	Incumbent re-elected.	▌ ✓ Karl Racine (Democratic) 92.77%
Guam	Elizabeth Barrett-Anderson	Republican	2014	Incumbent retired. Independent gain.	▌ ✓ Leevin Camacho (Independent) 64.2%; ▌ Douglas Moylan (Republican) 30.56%
Northern Mariana Islands	Edward Manibusan	Nonpartisan (Note: Although Manibusan is affiliated with the Democratic Party, the CNMI Attorney General race is a nonpartisan contest and candidates do not run with a party affiliation.)	2014	Incumbent re-elected.	▌ ✓ Edward Manibusan (Nonpartisan) 100%

== Closest races ==
States where the margin of victory was under 1%:

1. Nevada, 0.4% (4,533 votes)
2. Wisconsin, 0.6% (17,190 votes)

States where the margin of victory was between 1% and 5%:

1. Georgia, 2.6% (100,756 votes)
2. Michigan, 2.7% (115,000 votes)
3. Arizona, 3.4% (80,672 votes)
4. Texas, 3.6% (295,109 votes)
5. Minnesota, 3.9% (98,948 votes)
6. Ohio, 4.4% (187,847 votes)

States where the margin of victory was between 5% and 10%:

1. Florida, 6.0% (487,620 votes)
2. Connecticut, 6.0% (81,980 votes)
3. Colorado, 6.5% (160,707 votes)

Blue denotes offices won by Democrats; red denotes those won by Republicans.

== Alabama ==
2018 Alabama Attorney General election
- November 3, 2018
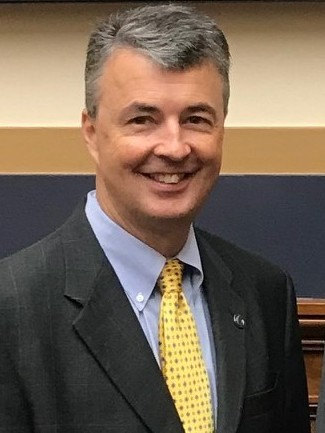

Nominee	Steve Marshall	Joseph Siegelman
Party	Republican	Democratic
Popular vote	1,004,438	702,858
Percentage	58.8%	41.1%
- County results Marshall: 50–60% 60–70% 70–80% 80–90% Siegelman: 50–60% 60–70% 70–80% 80–90%
Attorney General before election
Steve Marshall
Republican
Elected Attorney General
Steve Marshall
Republican

The 2018 Alabama Attorney General election was held on November 6, 2018, to elect the Attorney General of Alabama.

Former Alabama Attorney General Troy King unsuccessfully sought the Republican nomination. Incumbent Republican attorney general Steve Marshall, who was appointed by Governor Bentley in February 2017 after appointing Attorney General Luther Strange to the U.S. Senate, ran for a first full term. Former chief deputy attorney general Alice Martin sought the Republican nomination. Attorney Joseph Siegelman, son of former governor Don Siegelman, is the nominee of the Democratic Party. Chris Christie ran for attorney general on the Democratic ballot. Christie has been a trial lawyer at Bradley Arant Boult Cummings for 30 years.

=== Republican primary ===
Republican primary results
Party	Candidate	Votes	%
Republican	Steve Marshall (incumbent)	154,219	28.36
Republican	Troy King	151,364	27.84
Republican	Alice Martin	126,374	23.24
Republican	Chess Bedsole	111,794	20.56
Total votes		543,751	100

==== Runoff ====
Republican primary runoff results
Party	Candidate	Votes	%
Republican	Steve Marshall (incumbent)	211,619	62.05
Republican	Troy King	129,427	37.95
Total votes		341,046	100

=== Democratic primary ===
Democratic primary results
Party	Candidate	Votes	%
Democratic	Joseph Siegelman	147,601	54.16
Democratic	Chris Christie	124,915	45.84
Total votes		272,516	100

=== General election ===
Alabama Attorney General election, 2018
Party	Candidate	Votes	%
Republican	Steve Marshall (incumbent)	1,004,438	58.79
Democratic	Joseph Siegelman	702,858	41.14
n/a	Write-ins	1,141	0.07
Total votes		1,708,437	100
Republican hold			

== Arizona ==
2018 Arizona Attorney General election
- November 6, 2018
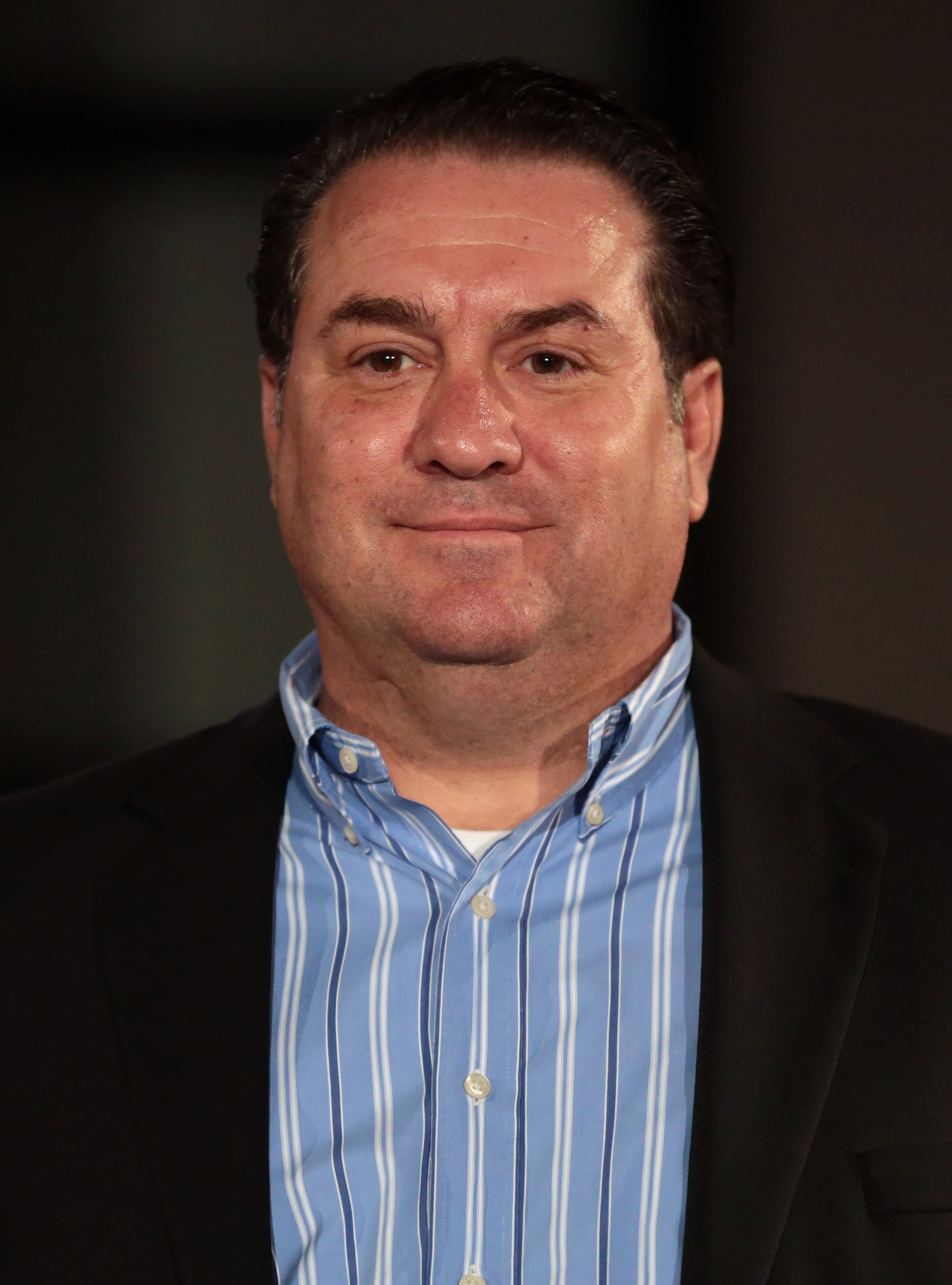

Nominee	Mark Brnovich	January Contreras
Party	Republican	Democratic
Popular vote	1,201,398	1,120,726
Percentage	51.7%	48.3%
- County results Brnovich: 50–60% 60–70% 70–80% Contreras: 50–60% 60–70% 70–80%
Attorney General before election
Mark Brnovich
Republican
Elected Attorney General
Mark Brnovich
Republican

The 2018 Arizona Attorney general election was held on November 6, 2018, to elect the attorney general of Arizona.

Incumbent Mark Brnovich was re-elected to a second term.

=== Republican primary ===
Republican primary results
Party	Candidate	Votes	%
Republican	Mark Brnovich (incumbent)	561,370	100.0
Total votes		561,370	100.0

=== Democratic primary ===
Democratic primary results
Party	Candidate	Votes	%
Democratic	January Contreras	464,510	100.0
Total votes		464,510	100.0

=== General election ===
Arizona Attorney General election, 2018
Party	Candidate	Votes	%
Republican	Mark Brnovich (incumbent)	1,201,398	51.7
Democratic	January Contreras	1,120,726	48.3
None	Anthony Camboni (write-in)	346	0.0
Total votes		2,322,470	100.0
Republican hold			

== Arkansas ==
2018 Arkansas Attorney General election
- November 6, 2018
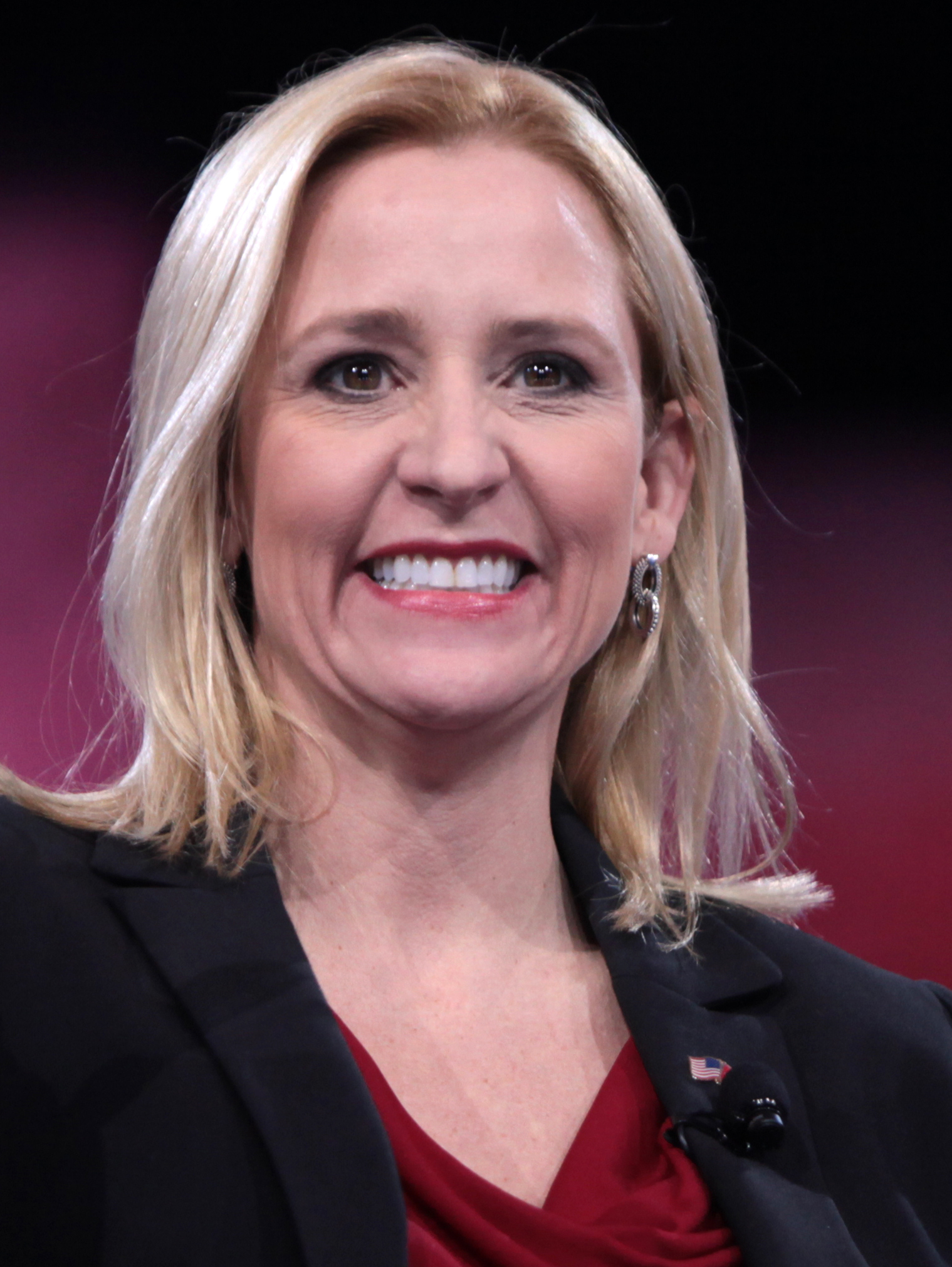

Nominee	Leslie Rutledge	Mike Lee
Party	Republican	Democratic
Popular vote	549,668	315,099
Percentage	61.8%	35.4%
- County results Rutledge: 40–50% 50–60% 60–70% 70–80% 80–90% Lee: 50–60%
Attorney General before election
Leslie Rutledge
Republican
Elected Attorney General
Leslie Rutledge
Republican

The 2018 Arkansas Attorney General election was held on November 6, 2018, to elect the attorney general of Arkansas.

Republican Attorney General Leslie Rutledge was elected to a second term.

=== General election ===
2018 Arkansas attorney general election
Party	Candidate	Votes	%
Republican	Leslie Rutledge (incumbent)	549,668	61.80
Democratic	Mike Lee	315,099	35.43
Libertarian	Kerry Hicks	24,652	2.77
Total votes		889,419	100.0
Republican hold			

== California ==
2018 California Attorney General election
- November 6, 2018
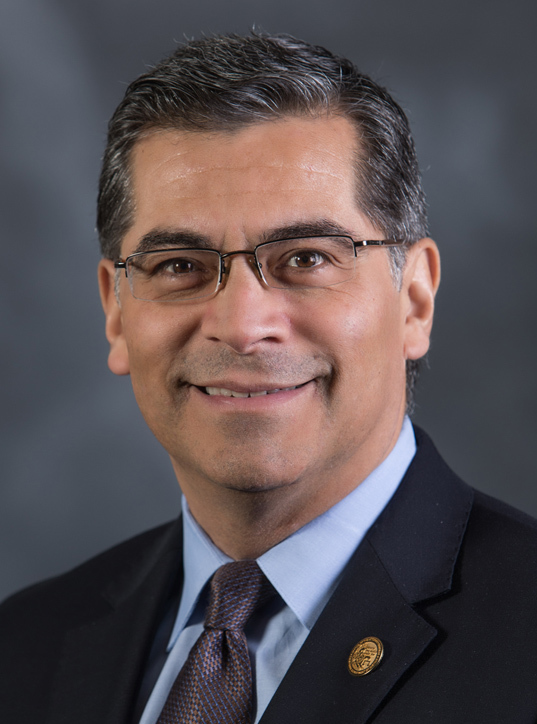

Candidate	Xavier Becerra	Steven Bailey
Party	Democratic	Republican
Popular vote	7,754,469	4,447,143
Percentage	63.6%	36.4%
- County results Becerra: 50–60% 60–70% 70–80% 80–90% Bailey: 50–60% 60–70% 70–80%
Attorney General before election
Xavier Becerra
Democratic
Elected Attorney General
Xavier Becerra
Democratic

The 2018 California Attorney General election was held on November 6, 2018, to elect the attorney general of California.

2014 election winner Kamala Harris was elected to the United States Senate during the 2016 Senate elections; incumbent Democratic Attorney General Xavier Becerra won election to a full term.

=== Primary election ===
Nonpartisan blanket primary results
Party	Candidate	Votes	%
Democratic	Xavier Becerra (incumbent)	3,024,611	45.8%
Republican	Steven Bailey	1,615,859	24.5%
Democratic	Dave Jones	1,017,427	15.4%
Republican	Eric Early	943,071	14.3%
Total votes		6,600,968	100%

=== General election ===
California Attorney General election, 2018
Party	Candidate	Votes	%	±%
Democratic	Xavier Becerra (incumbent)	7,754,469	63.6%	+6.1%
Republican	Steven Bailey	4,447,143	36.4%	−6.1%
Total votes		12,201,612	100.0%	N/A
Democratic hold				

== Colorado ==
2018 Colorado Attorney General election
- November 6, 2018
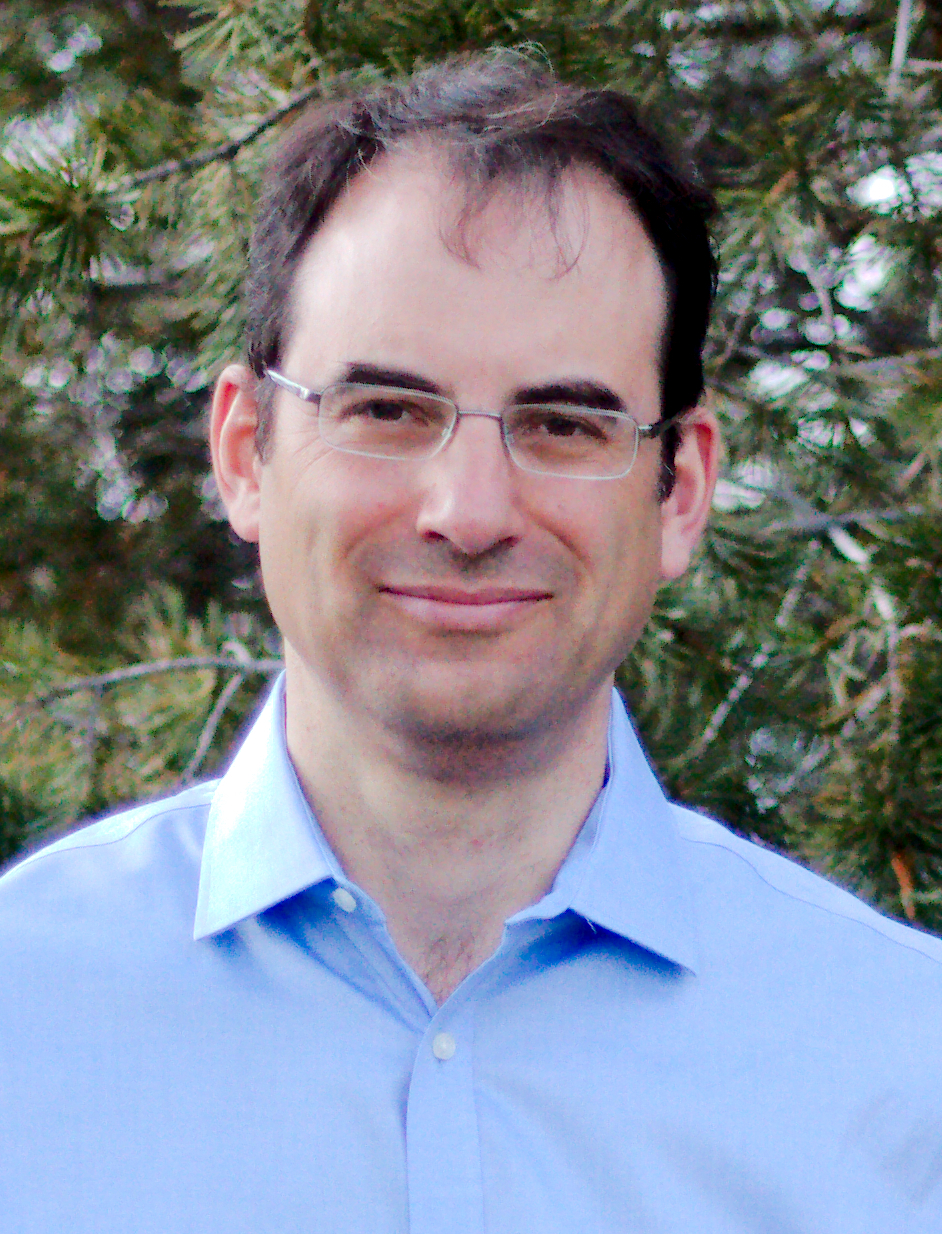

Nominee	Phil Weiser	George Brauchler
Party	Democratic	Republican
Popular vote	1,285,464	1,124,757
Percentage	51.6%	45.1%
- County results Weiser: 40–50% 50–60% 60–70% 70–80% Brauchler: 40–50% 50–60% 60–70% 70–80% 80–90%
Attorney General before election
Cynthia Coffman
Republican
Elected Attorney General
Phil Weiser
Democratic

The 2018 Colorado Attorney General election was held on November 6, 2018, to elect the attorney general of Colorado.

Incumbent Republican attorney general Cynthia Coffman ran for governor, but was eliminated at the state Republican party convention in April.

=== Republican primary ===
Republican primary results
Party	Candidate	Votes	%
Republican	George Brauchler	414,532	100.0
Total votes		414,532	100.0

=== Democratic primary ===
Democratic primary results
Party	Candidate	Votes	%
Democratic	Phil Weiser	298,048	50.43
Democratic	Joe Salazar	292,912	49.57
Total votes		590,960	100.0

=== General election ===
Colorado Attorney General election, 2018
Party	Candidate	Votes	%
Democratic	Phil Weiser	1,285,464	51.6
Republican	George Brauchler	1,124,757	45.1
Libertarian	William "Bill" Robinson III	81,733	3.3
Total votes		2,491,954	100.0
Democratic gain from Republican			

== Connecticut ==
2018 Connecticut Attorney General election
- November 6, 2018
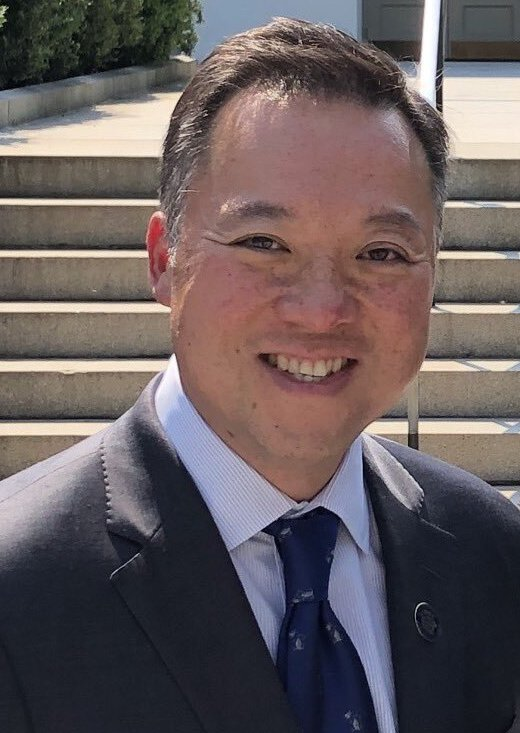

Nominee	William Tong	Susan Hatfield
Party	Democratic	Republican
Popular vote	715,340	633,360
Percentage	52.5%	46.5%
- County results Tong: 50–60% Hatfield: 40–50% 50–60%
Attorney General before election
George Jepsen
Democratic
Elected Attorney General
William Tong
Democratic

The 2018 Connecticut Attorney General election was held on November 6, 2018, to elect the attorney general of Connecticut.

Incumbent Attorney General George Jepsen did not seek re-election. Democratic nominee William Tong defeated Republican nominee Susan Hatfield.

=== Republican primary ===
Republican primary results
Party	Candidate	Votes	%
Republican	Susan Hatfield	106,076	79.3
Republican	John Shaban	27,639	20.7
Total votes		133,715	100.0

=== Democratic primary ===
Democratic primary results
Party	Candidate	Votes	%
Democratic	William Tong	119,574	57.4
Democratic	Chris Mattei	53,822	25.8
Democratic	Paul Doyle	34,822	16.7
Total votes		208,218	100.0

=== General election ===
Connecticut Attorney General election, 2018
Party	Candidate	Votes	%
Democratic	William Tong	715,340	52.5
Republican	Susan Hatfield	633,360	46.5
Green	Peter Goselin	14,358	1.1
Total votes		1,363,058	100.0
Democratic hold			

== Delaware ==
2018 Delaware Attorney General election
- November 6, 2018
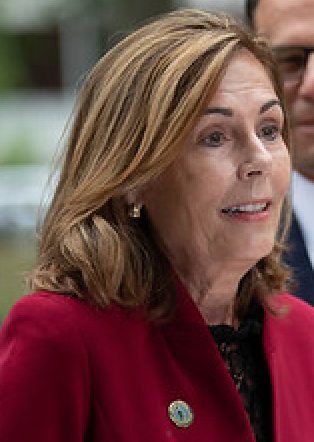

Nominee	Kathy Jennings	Bernard Pepukayi
Party	Democratic	Republican
Popular vote	218,351	137,730
Percentage	61.31%	38.68%
- County results Jennings: 50–60% 60–70% Pepukayi: 50–60%
Attorney General before election
Matthew Denn
Democratic
Elected Attorney General
Kathy Jennings
Democratic

The 2018 Delaware Attorney General election took place on November 6, 2018. The Delaware primary election for federal and state candidates took place on September 6, 2018. Incumbent Attorney General Matthew Denn announced on August 28, 2017, that he would not seek re-election.

=== Democratic primary ===
Democratic primary results
Party	Candidate	Votes	%
Democratic	Kathy Jennings	46,038	56.6
Democratic	LaKresha Roberts	17,584	21.6
Democratic	Chris Johnson	12,194	15.0
Democratic	Tim Mullaney	5,513	6.8
Margin of victory		28,454	35.0%
Turnout		81,329	25.4%
Total votes		81,329	100.0

=== General election ===
Delaware Attorney General election, 2018
Party	Candidate	Votes	%
Democratic	Kathy Jennings	218,351	61.31%
Republican	Bernard Pepukayi	137,730	38.68%
Total votes		356,081	100.0%
Democratic hold			

== Florida ==
2018 Florida Attorney General election
- November 6, 2018
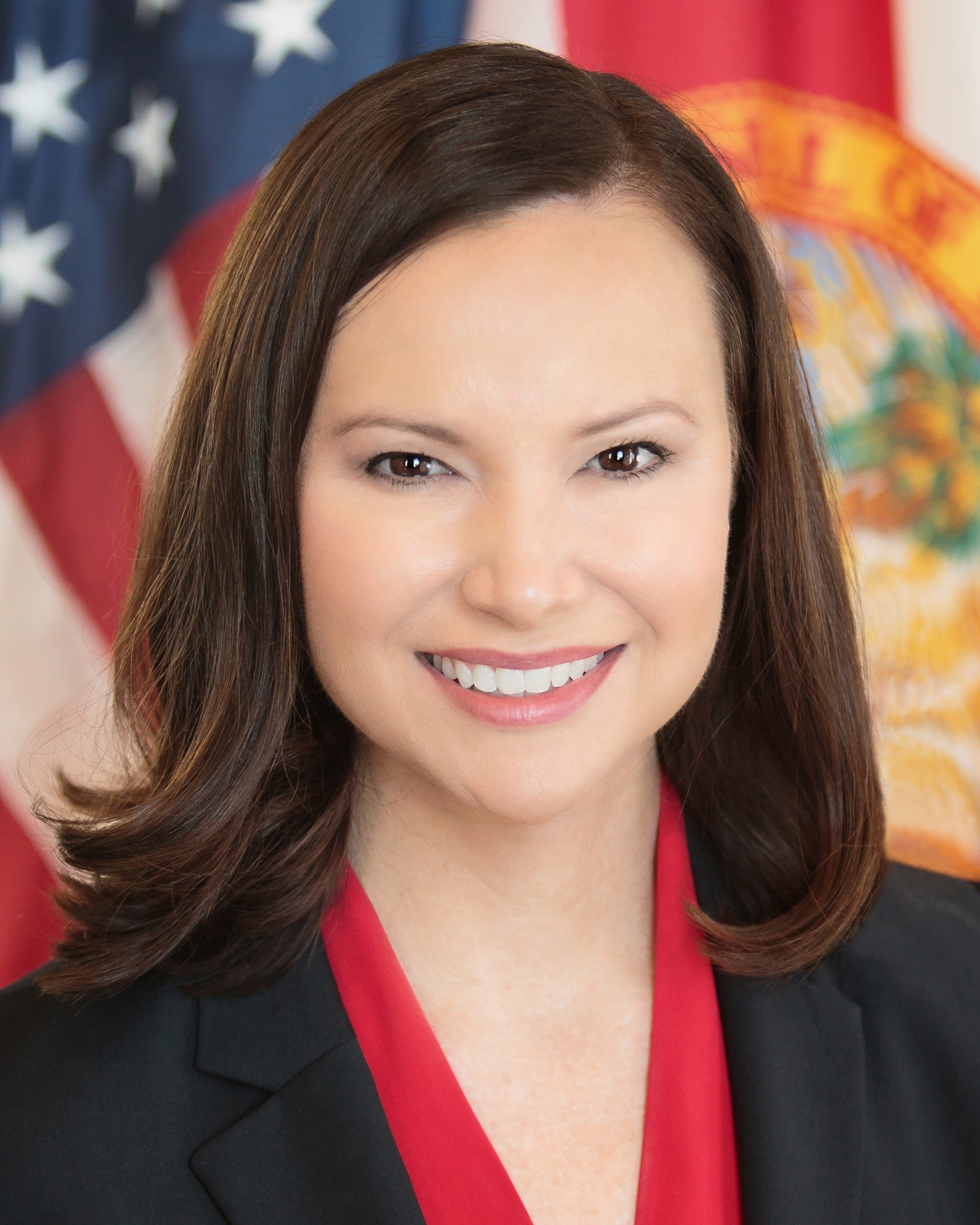

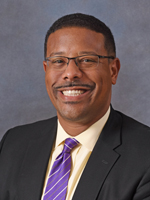
Nominee	Ashley Moody	Sean Shaw
Party	Republican	Democratic
Popular vote	4,232,532	3,744,912
Percentage	52.1%	46.1%
- County Results; Moody: 40–50% 50–60% 60–70% 70–80% 80–90% Shaw: 50–60% 60–70%
Attorney General before election
Pam Bondi
Republican
Elected Attorney General
Ashley Moody
Republican

The 2018 Florida Attorney General election took place on November 6, 2018, to elect the attorney general of Florida. Incumbent Republican attorney general Pam Bondi was term-limited and could not seek a third consecutive term.

Republican candidate Ashley Moody defeated Democrat Sean Shaw, with the election being called after 93% of the precincts reporting. Moody won by about 6 percentage points, which was the widest margin of any Florida statewide race in 2018.

=== Republican primary ===
Republican primary results
Party	Candidate	Votes	%
Republican	Ashley B. Moody	882,028	56.8
Republican	Frank White	670,823	43.2
Total votes		1,552,851	100.0

=== Democratic primary ===
Democratic primary results
Party	Candidate	Votes	%
Democratic	Sean Shaw	1,031,640	73.8
Democratic	Ryan Torrens	367,053	26.2
Total votes		1,398,693	100.0

=== General election ===
Florida Attorney General election, 2018
Party	Candidate	Votes	%	±%
Republican	Ashley Moody	4,232,532	52.11%	−2.99%
Democratic	Sean Shaw	3,744,912	46.10%	+4.09%
Independent	Jeffrey Marc Siskind	145,296	1.79%	N/A
Total votes		8,122,740	100.0%	N/A
Republican hold				

== Georgia ==
2018 Georgia Attorney General election
- November 6, 2018
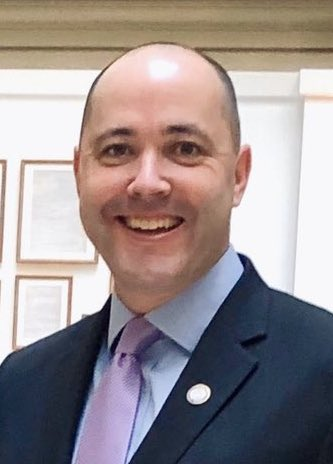

Nominee	Chris Carr	Charlie Bailey
Party	Republican	Democratic
Popular vote	1,981,563	1,880,807
Percentage	51.30%	48.70%
- County results Carr: 50–60% 60–70% 70–80% 80–90% >90% Bailey: 50–60% 60–70% 70–80% 80–90%
Attorney General of Georgia before election
Sam Olens
Republican
Elected Attorney General of Georgia
Chris Carr
Republican

The 2018 Georgia Attorney General election took place on November 6, 2018, to elect the attorney general of Georgia.

Incumbent Republican attorney general Sam Olens resigned to become president of Kennesaw State University effective November 1, 2016, with Georgia Department of Economic Development Commissioner Christopher M. "Chris" Carr being appointed to serve the remainder of the term. Carr will be eligible to run for election to a full term in 2018.

Potential Republican candidates include State Senator Josh McKoon and former state representative B.J. Pak.

Potential Democratic candidates included State Representative Stacey Evans and former Georgia Judicial Qualifications Commission Chair Lester Tate. 2010 nominee and former Dougherty County District Attorney Ken Hodges was considered a potential candidate, but has decided to run for a seat on the Georgia Court of Appeals instead. Columbus Mayor Teresa Tomlinson had ruled out running for attorney general. As of July 2018, Charlie Bailey, former Senior Assistant District Attorney in the Fulton County District Attorney's office, was running.

=== Republican primary ===
Republican primary results
Party	Candidate	Votes	%
Republican	Chris Carr (incumbent)	475,122	100
Total votes		475,122	100

=== Democratic primary ===
Democratic primary results
Party	Candidate	Votes	%
Democratic	Charlie Bailey	456,105	100
Total votes		456,105	100

=== General election ===
Georgia Attorney General election, 2018
Party	Candidate	Votes	%
Republican	Chris Carr (incumbent)	1,981,563	51.30
Democratic	Charlie Bailey	1,880,807	48.70
Total votes		3,862,370	100
Republican hold			

== Idaho ==
2018 Idaho Attorney General election
- November 6, 2018
Nominee	Lawrence Wasden	Bruce Bistline
Party	Republican	Democratic
Popular vote	384,791	203,283
Percentage	65.4%	34.6%
- County results Wasden: 50–60% 60–70% 70–80% 80–90% Bistline: 50–60% 60–70%
Attorney General before election
Lawrence Wasden
Republican
Elected Attorney General
Lawrence Wasden
Republican

The 2018 Idaho Attorney General election took place on November 6, 2018, to elect the attorney general of Idaho.

Incumbent Republican attorney general Lawrence Wasden announced on September 7, 2017, that he would run for a fifth term.

=== Republican primary ===
Republican primary results
Party	Candidate	Votes	%
Idaho Republican Party	Lawrence Wasden (incumbent)	157,064	100.0
Total votes		157,064	100.0

=== Democratic primary ===
Democratic primary results
Party	Candidate	Votes	%
Democratic	Bruce S. Bistline	47,637	100.0
Total votes		47,637	100.0

=== General election ===
Idaho Attorney General election, 2018
Party	Candidate	Votes	%
Idaho Republican Party	Lawrence Wasden (incumbent)	384,791	65.4%
Democratic	Bruce Bistline	203,283	34.6%
Total votes		588,074	100%

== Illinois ==
2018 Illinois Attorney General election
- November 6, 2018
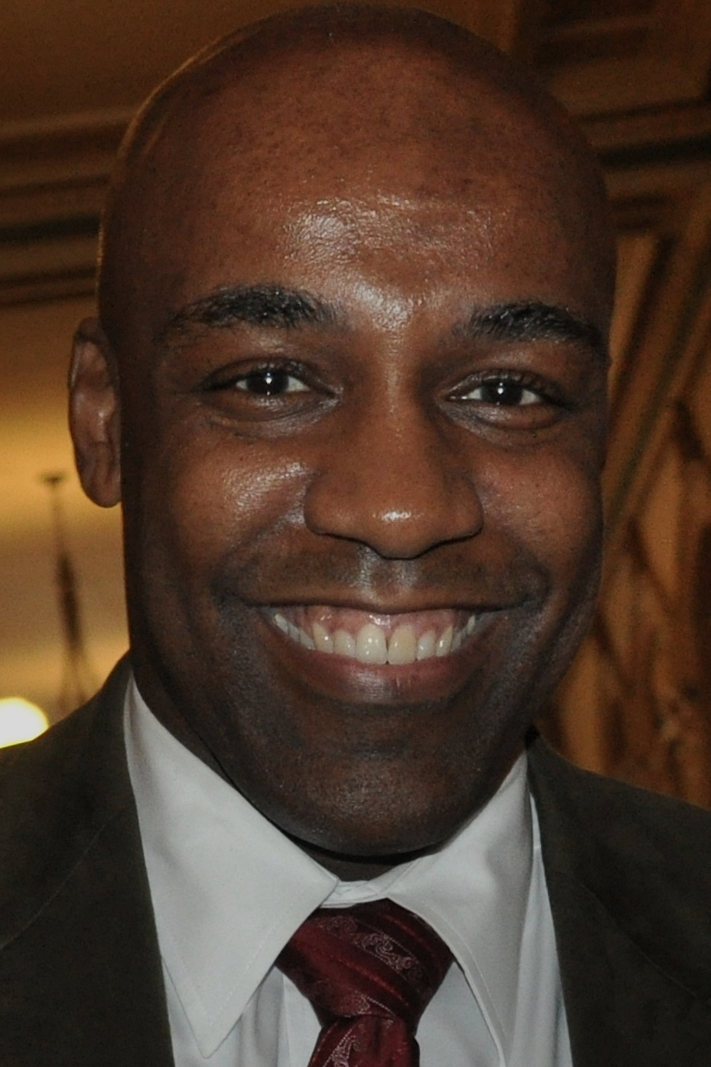

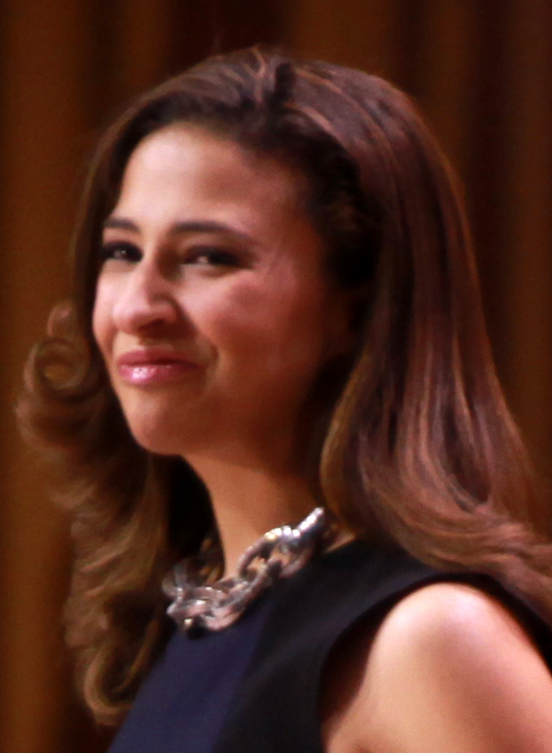
Nominee	Kwame Raoul	Erika Harold
Party	Democratic	Republican
Popular vote	2,488,326	1,944,142
Percentage	54.7%	42.7%
- County results Raoul: 40–50% 50–60% 60–70% 70–80% Harold: 40–50% 50–60% 60–70% 70–80%
Attorney General before election
Lisa Madigan
Democratic
Elected Attorney General
Kwame Raoul
Democratic

The 2018 Illinois Attorney General election took place on November 6, 2018, to elect the attorney general of Illinois.

Incumbent Democratic attorney general Lisa Madigan, who had served since 2003, did not seek a fifth term. Democrat Kwame Raoul won the election with 55 percent of the vote, while Republican Erika Harold took 43 percent of the vote.

=== Republican primary ===
Republican primary results
Party	Candidate	Votes	%
Republican	Erika Harold	389,197	59.16
Republican	Gary Grasso	268,688	40.84
Total votes		657,885	100.00

=== Democratic primary ===
Democratic primary results
Party	Candidate	Votes	%
Democratic	Kwame Raoul	390,472	30.17
Democratic	Pat Quinn	352,425	27.23
Democratic	Sharon Fairley	164,304	12.70
Democratic	Nancy Rotering	123,446	9.54
Democratic	Scott Drury	102,193	7.90
Democratic	Jesse Ruiz	70,158	5.42
Democratic	Renato Mariotti	51,902	4.01
Democratic	Aaron Goldstein	39,196	3.03
Total votes		1,294,096	100.00

=== General election ===
2018 Illinois Attorney General election
Party	Candidate	Votes	%	±%
Democratic	Kwame Raoul	2,488,326	54.71%	−4.75%
Republican	Erika Harold	1,944,142	42.74%	+4.97%
Libertarian	Bubba Harsy	115,941	2.55%	−0.22%
Total votes		4,548,409	100.00%	N/A
Democratic hold				

== Iowa ==
2018 Iowa Attorney General election
- November 6, 2018
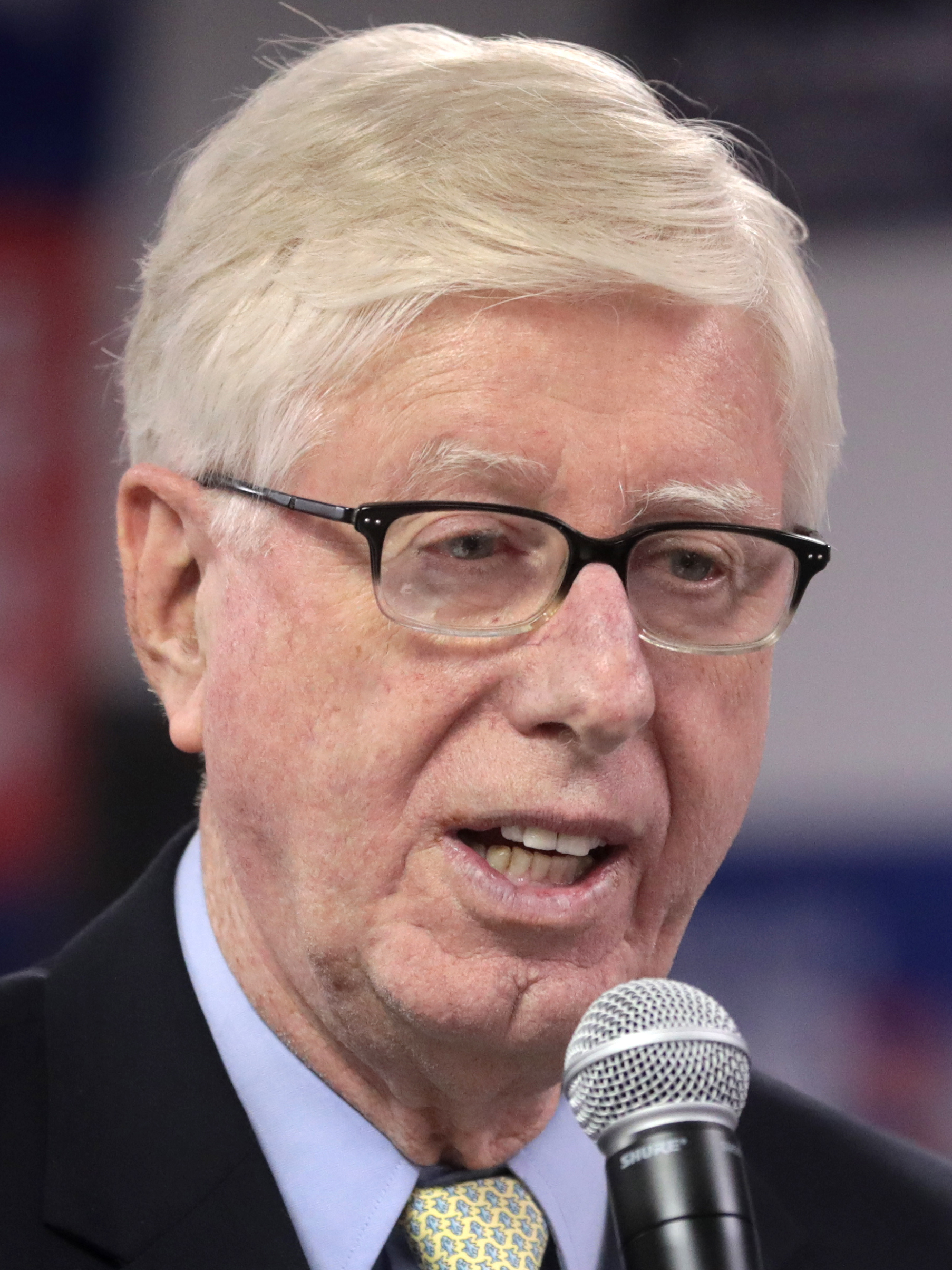
Candidate	Tom Miller	Marco Battaglia
Party	Democratic	Libertarian
Popular vote	880,531	262,131
Percentage	76.51%	22.78%
- County results Miller: 60–70% 70–80% 80–90%
Attorney General before election
Tom Miller
Democratic
Elected Attorney General
Tom Miller
Democratic

The 2018 Iowa Attorney General election took place on November 6, 2018, to elect the attorney general of Iowa.

Incumbent Democratic attorney general Tom Miller won re-election with 76.5% of the vote. The Republican Party did not nominate anyone, but the Libertarian Party nominated Marco Battaglia.

=== Democratic primary ===
Democratic primary results
Party	Candidate	Votes	%
Democratic	Tom Miller (incumbent)	157,483	99.7
Democratic	Write-ins	546	0.3
Total votes		158,029	100.0

=== General election ===
Iowa Attorney General election, 2018
Party	Candidate	Votes	%
Democratic	Tom Miller (incumbent)	880,531	76.5
Libertarian	Marco Battaglia	262,131	22.8
n/a	Write-ins	8,237	0.7
Total votes		1,150,899	100.0
Democratic hold			

== Kansas ==
2018 Kansas Attorney General election
- November 6, 2018
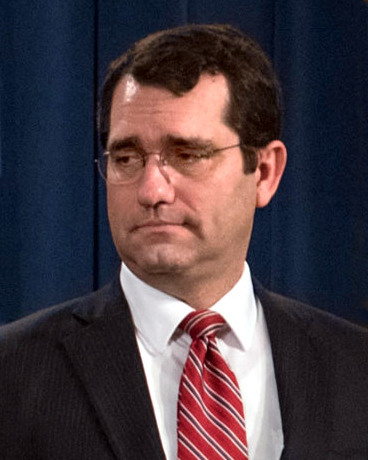

Nominee	Derek Schmidt	Sarah Swain
Party	Republican	Democratic
Popular vote	614,436	427,289
Percentage	58.98%	41.02%
- County Results; Schmidt: 50–60% 60–70% 70–80% 80–90% Swain: 50–60% 60–70%
Attorney General before election
Stephen Six
Republican
Elected Attorney General
Derek Schmidt
Republican

The 2018 Kansas Attorney General election took place on November 6, 2018, to elect the attorney general of Kansas.

Incumbent Attorney General Derek Schmidt won re-election with 59 percent of the vote, defeating Democratic challenger Sarah Swain.

=== Republican primary ===
Republican primary results
Party	Candidate	Votes	%
Republican	Derek Schmidt	269,212	100.0
Total votes		269,212	100.00

=== Democratic primary ===
Democratic primary results
Party	Candidate	Votes	%
Democratic	Sarah Swain	140,503	100.0
Total votes		140,503	100.0

=== General election ===
2018 Kansas Attorney General election
Party	Candidate	Votes	%
Republican	Derek Schmidt	614,436	59.0%
Democratic	Sarah Swain	427,289	41.0%
Total votes		1,041,725	100.00%
Republican hold			

== Maryland ==
2018 Maryland Attorney General Election
- November 6, 2018
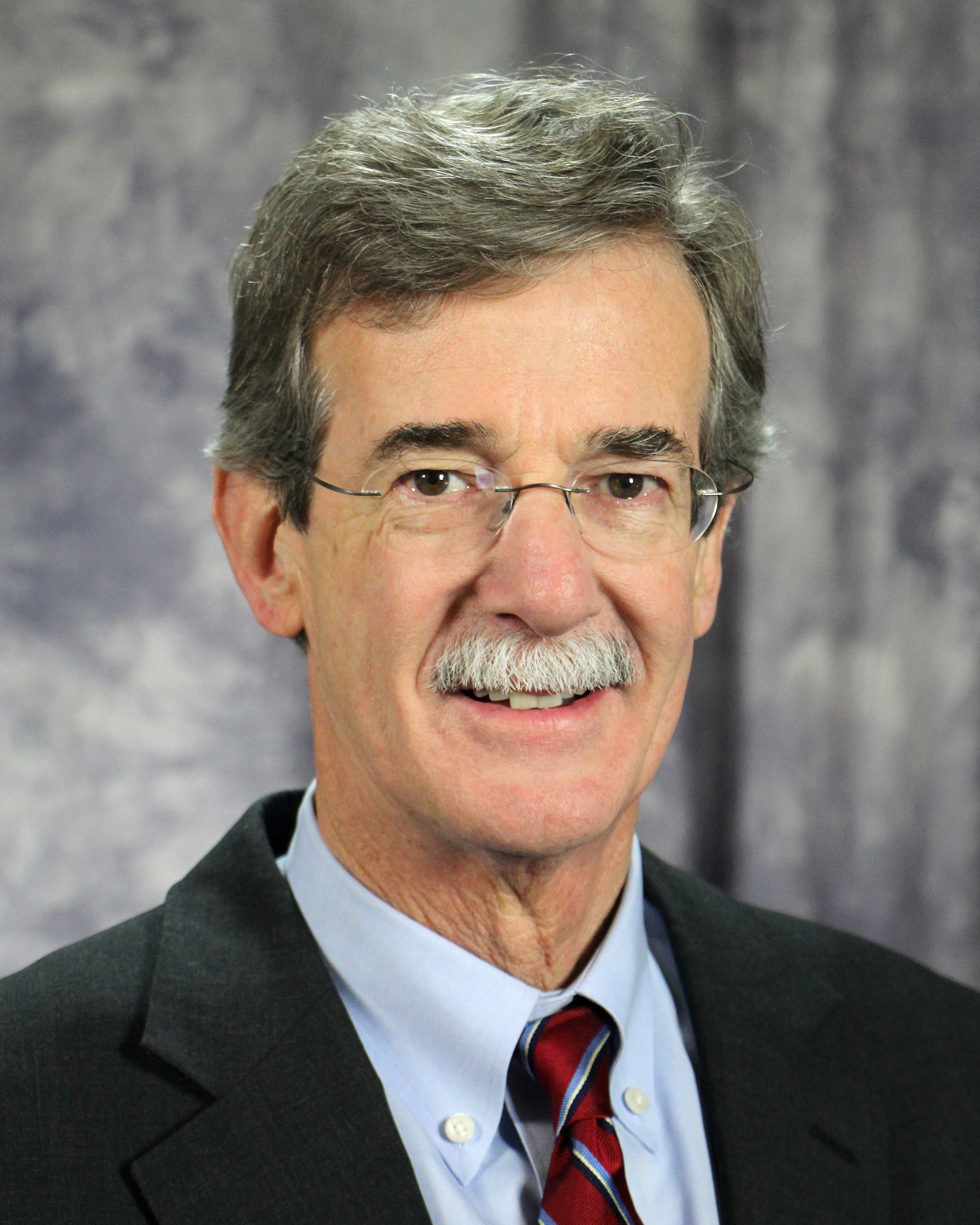

Nominee	Brian Frosh	Craig Wolf
Party	Democratic	Republican
Popular vote	1,474,833	799,035
Percentage	64.8%	35.1%
- County results Frosh: 50–60% 60–70% 70–80% 80–90% >90% Wolf: 50-60% 60-70% 70-80%
Attorney General before election
Brian Frosh
Democratic
Elected Attorney General
Brian Frosh
Democratic

The Maryland Attorney General election of 2018 was held on November 6, 2018, to elect the attorney general of Maryland.

Incumbent Democratic attorney general Brian Frosh was eligible to seek a second term in office, filed for re-election on February 15, 2018, and was unopposed for the Democratic nomination. Republican former prosecutor and trade group CEO Craig Wolf was unopposed for the Republican nomination. Brian Frosh won with 64.8% of the vote.

=== Republican primary ===
Republican primary results
Party	Candidate	Votes	%
Republican	Craig Wolf	175,429	100.0

=== Democratic primary ===
Democratic primary results
Party	Candidate	Votes	%
Democratic	Brian Frosh (incumbent)	505,897	100.0

=== General election ===
Maryland Attorney General election, 2018
Party	Candidate	Votes	%	±%
Democratic	Brian Frosh (incumbent)	1,474,833	64.81%	+9.01%
Republican	Craig Wolf	799,035	35.11%	−5.57%
n/a	Write-ins	1,920	0.08%	−0.04%
Total votes		2,275,788	100.00%	N/A
Democratic hold				

== Massachusetts ==
2018 Massachusetts Attorney General Election
- November 6, 2018
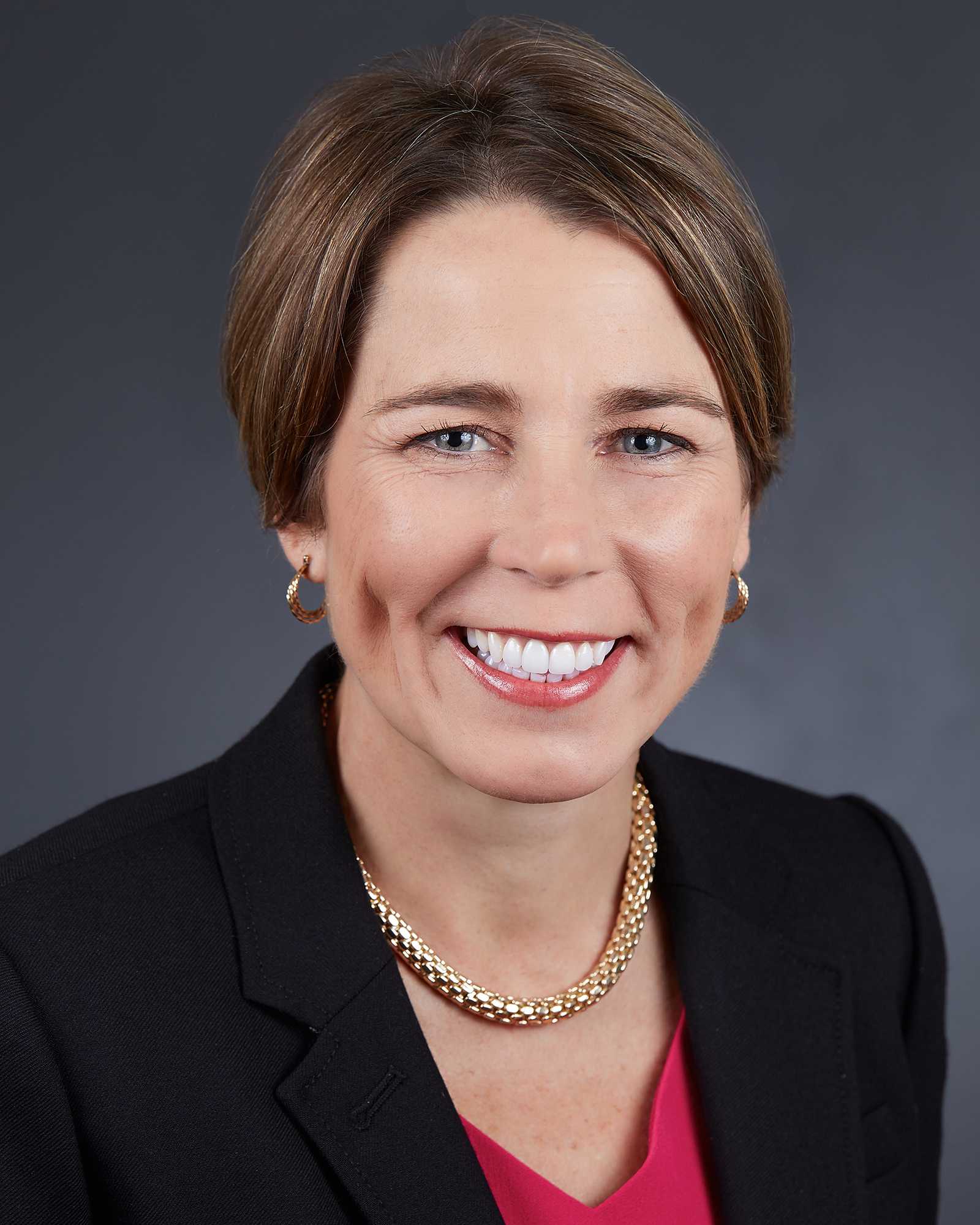

Nominee	Maura Healey	James McMahon
Party	Democratic	Republican
Popular vote	1,874,209	804,832
Percentage	69.91%	30.02%
- County results Healey: 60–70% 70–80% 80–90%

The Massachusetts Attorney General election of 2018 was held on November 6, 2018, to elect the attorney general of Massachusetts.

Incumbent Democratic attorney general Maura Healey won re-election to a second consecutive term. Healey was a speculative candidate for Governor but declined to run.

=== Republican primary ===
Republican primary results
Party	Candidate	Votes	%
Republican	James McMahon	134,963	61.1
Republican	Daniel Shores	86,098	38.9
Total votes		221,061	100.0

=== General election ===
Massachusetts Attorney General election, 2018
Party	Candidate	Votes	%
Democratic	Maura Healey (incumbent)	1,874,209	69.9
Republican	James McMahon	804,832	30.0
n/a	Write-ins	1,858	0.1
Total votes		2,680,899	100.0
Democratic hold			

== Michigan ==
2018 Michigan Attorney General election
- November 6, 2018
- Turnout: 4,111,676
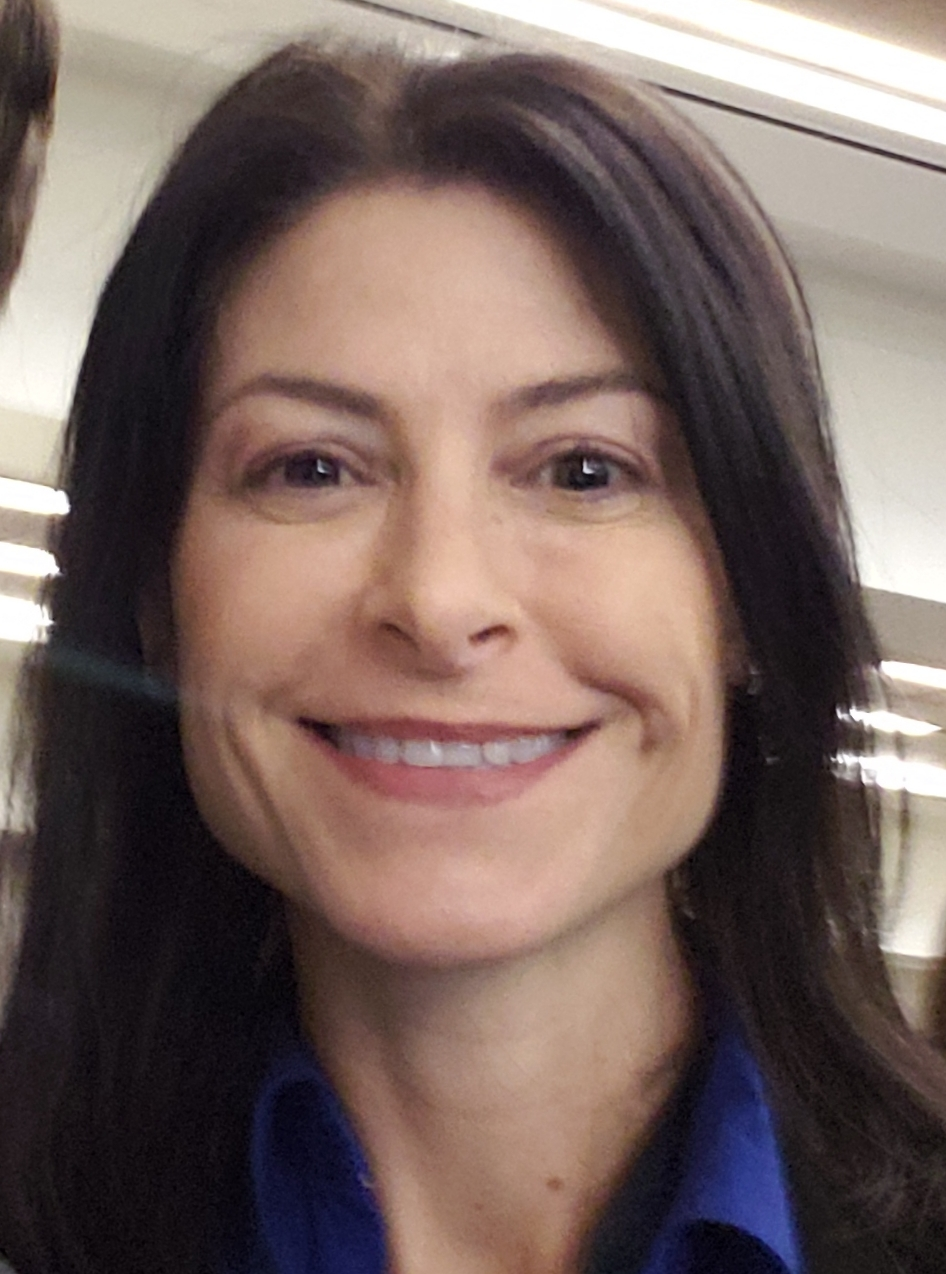

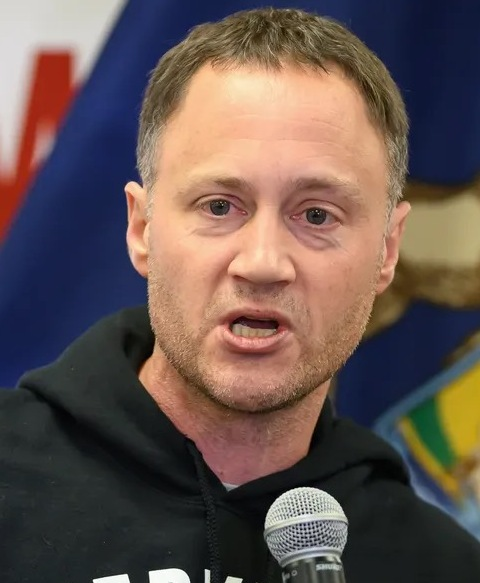
Nominee	Dana Nessel	Tom Leonard
Party	Democratic	Republican
Popular vote	2,031,117	1,916,117
Percentage	49.0%	46.3%
- County results Nessel: 40–50% 50–60% 60–70% Leonard: 40–50% 50–60% 60–70% 70–80%
Attorney General before election
Bill Schuette
Republican
Elected Attorney General
Dana Nessel
Democratic

The Michigan Attorney General election of 2018 took place on November 6, 2018.

This race occurred alongside elections to elect Michigan's governor, Class I United States Senator, secretary of state, as well as elections for Michigan's 14 seats in the United States House of Representatives, all 38 seats in the Michigan Senate and all 110 seats in the Michigan House of Representatives. Incumbent Republican attorney general Bill Schuette was prohibited from seeking a third term due to term limits and unsuccessfully ran for governor of Michigan instead. The Michigan GOP was unsuccessful in looking to win its 5th straight attorney general election. Along with the offices of lieutenant governor and secretary of state, the nominees for attorney general were chosen by party delegates at their respective party conventions.

Nessel defeated Leonard by 115,000 votes, becoming the first Democratic attorney general of Michigan since 2003, when Jennifer Granholm left office to become governor.

=== General election ===
Michigan Attorney General election, 2018
Party	Candidate	Votes	%	±%
Democratic	Dana Nessel	2,031,117	49.04%	+4.85%
Republican	Tom Leonard	1,916,117	46.26%	−5.81%
Libertarian	Lisa Lane Giola	86,807	2.10%	+0.24%
Independent	Chris Graveline	69,889	1.69%	N/A
U.S. Taxpayers'	Gerald Van Sickle	38,114	0.92%	−0.08%
Total votes		4,142,044	100.00%	N/A
Democratic gain from Republican				

== Minnesota ==
2018 Minnesota Attorney General election
- November 6, 2018
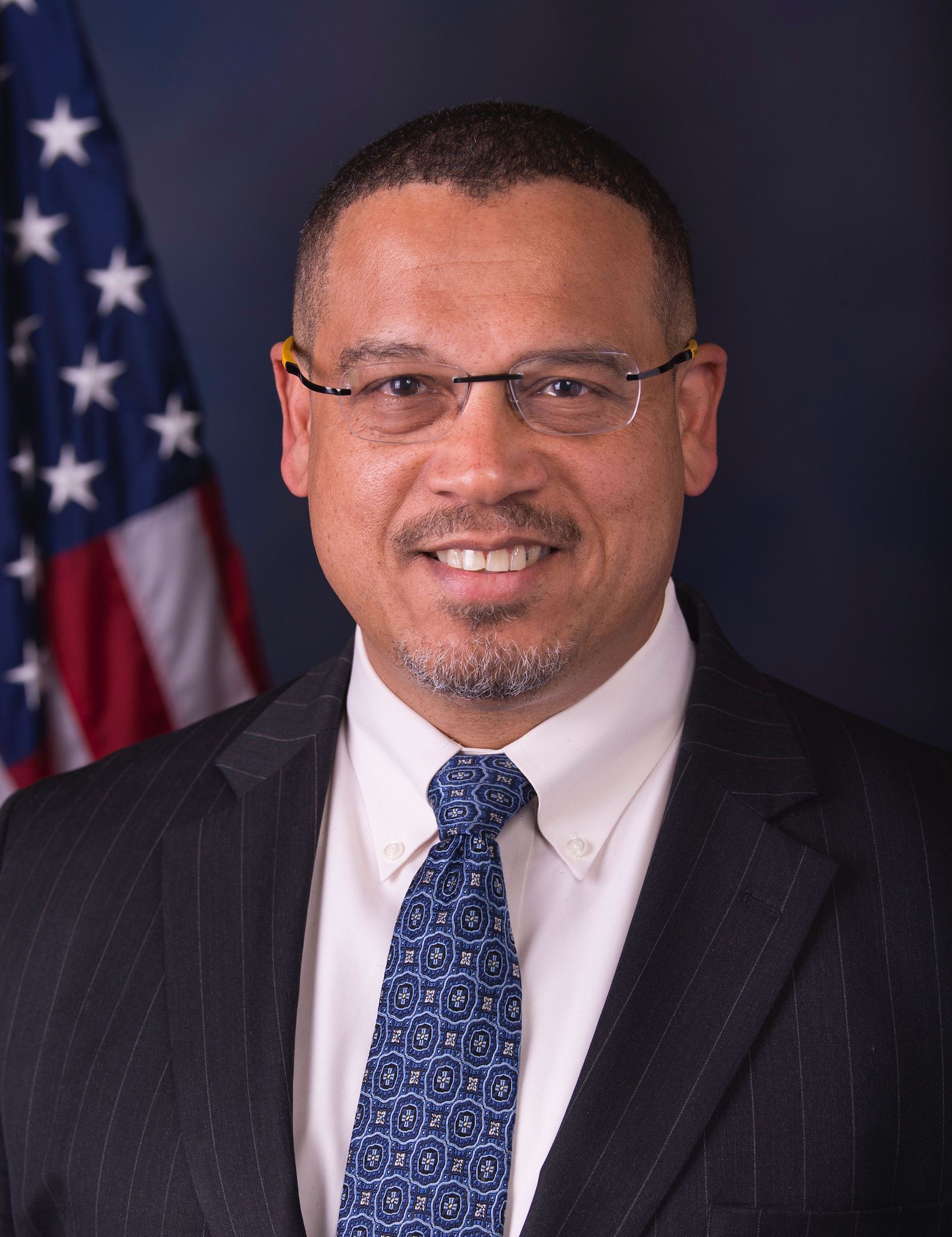

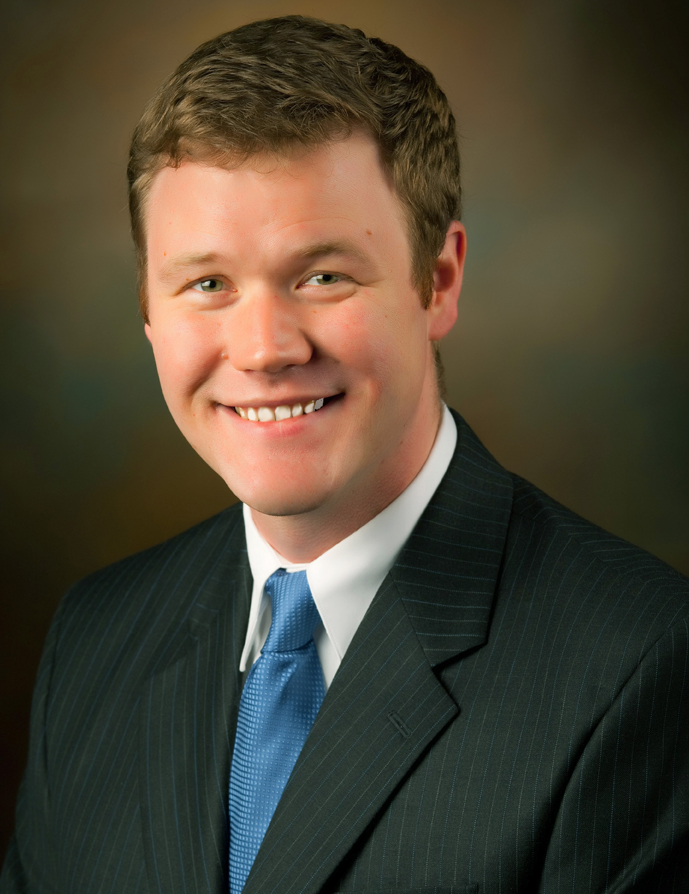

Nominee	Keith Ellison	Doug Wardlow	Noah Johnson
Party	Democratic (DFL)	Republican	Grassroots
Popular vote	1,249,407	1,150,459	145,748
Percentage	49.0%	45.1%	5.7%
- County Results Ellison: 40–50% 50–60% 60–70% Wardlow: 40–50% 50–60% 60–70%
Attorney General before election
Lori Swanson
Democratic (DFL)
Elected Attorney General
Keith Ellison
Democratic (DFL)

The 2018 Minnesota Attorney General election was held on November 6, 2018, to elect the attorney general of the U.S. state of Minnesota.

A primary election was held on August 14, 2018, in which Doug Wardlow was nominated as the Republican candidate and Keith Ellison was nominated as the Democratic–Farmer–Labor (DFL) candidate. Ellison won the election.

=== Republican primary ===
Republican primary election results
Party	Candidate	Votes	%
Republican	Doug Wardlow	135,971	46.3
Republican	Sharon Anderson	94,245	32.0
Republican	Bob Lessard	63,722	21.7
Total votes		293,398	100.0

=== Democratic–Farmer–Labor primary ===
Democratic primary election results
Party	Candidate	Votes	%
Democratic (DFL)	Keith Ellison	281,142	49.8
Democratic (DFL)	Debra Hilstrom	108,048	19.2
Democratic (DFL)	Tom Foley	70,786	12.5
Democratic (DFL)	Matt Pelikan	59,876	10.6
Democratic (DFL)	Mike Rothman	44,522	7.9
Total votes		564,374	100.0

=== General election ===
Minnesota Attorney General election, 2018
Party	Candidate	Votes	%	±%
Democratic (DFL)	Keith Ellison	1,249,407	48.96%	−3.64%
Republican	Doug Wardlow	1,150,459	45.08%	+6.07%
Grassroots	Noah Johnson	145,748	5.71%	N/A
Write-in		6,158	0.24%	+0.20%
Total votes		2,551,772	100.00%	N/A
Democratic (DFL) hold				

== Nebraska ==
2018 Nebraska Attorney General election
- November 6, 2018
Nominee	Doug Peterson
Party	Republican
Popular vote	516,777
Percentage	100.00%
- County results Peterson: 100%
Attorney General before election
Doug Peterson
Republican
Elected Attorney General
Doug Peterson
Republican

The 2018 Nebraska Attorney General election was held on November 6, 2018, to elect the attorney general of the U.S. state of Nebraska.

Incumbent Republican attorney general Doug Peterson ran for a second term. Omaha attorney Evangelos Argyrakis, ran in the Democratic primary. However, after being charged with felony strangulation following an altercation with his 82-year-old father on April 8, 2018, Nebraska Democratic Party called on him to step aside, which he did on June 25, 2018. This left Peterson running unopposed in the general election.

=== Republican primary ===
Republican primary results
Party	Candidate	Votes	%
Republican	Doug Peterson (incumbent)	140,675	100.0

=== Democratic primary ===
Democratic primary results
Party	Candidate	Votes	%
Democratic	Evangelos Argyrakis	67,022	100.0

=== General election ===
General election results
Party	Candidate	Votes	%
Republican	Doug Peterson (incumbent)	516,777	100.0

== Nevada ==
2018 Nevada Attorney General election
- November 6, 2018
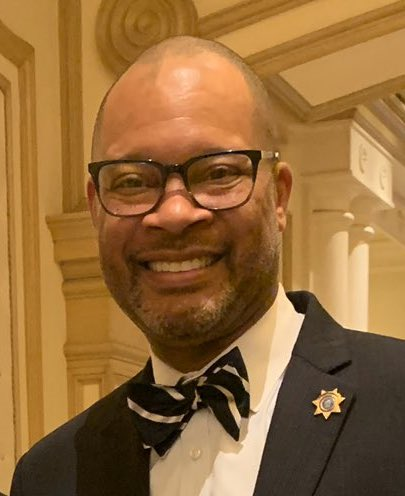

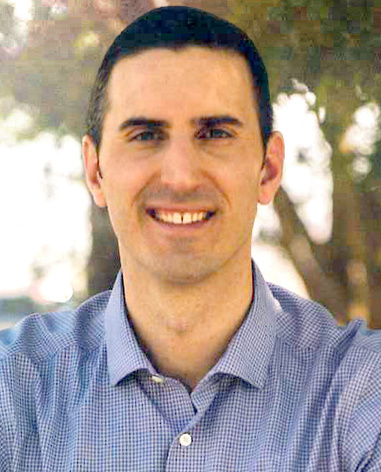
Nominee	Aaron Ford	Wesley Duncan
Party	Democratic	Republican
Popular vote	456,225	451,692
Percentage	47.2%	46.8%
- County results Ford: 50–60% Duncan: 40–50% 50–60% 60–70% 70–80% 80–90%
Attorney General before election
Adam Laxalt
Republican
Elected Attorney General
Aaron Ford
Democratic

The 2018 Nevada Attorney General election was held on November 6, 2018, to elect the attorney general of the U.S. state of Nevada.

Incumbent Republican attorney general Adam Laxalt did not run for a second term and instead ran unsuccessfully for governor.

=== Republican primary ===
Republican primary results
Party	Candidate	Votes	%
Republican	Wesley Duncan	82,427	59.8
Republican	Craig Mueller	43,346	31.4
Republican	None of These Candidates	12,103	8.8
Total votes		137,876	100.0

=== Democratic primary ===
Democratic primary results
Party	Candidate	Votes	%
Democratic	Aaron Ford	94,664	68.0
Democratic	Stuart MacKie	26,610	19.1
Democratic	None of These Candidates	17,922	12.9
Total votes		139,196	100.0

=== General election ===
Nevada Attorney General election, 2018
Party	Candidate	Votes	%
Democratic	Aaron Ford	456,225	47.2
Republican	Wesley Duncan	451,692	46.8
Independent American	Joel Hansen	32,259	3.3
n/a	None of These Candidates	25,577	2.7
Total votes		965,753	100.0
Democratic gain from Republican			

== New Mexico ==
2018 New Mexico Attorney General election
- November 6, 2018
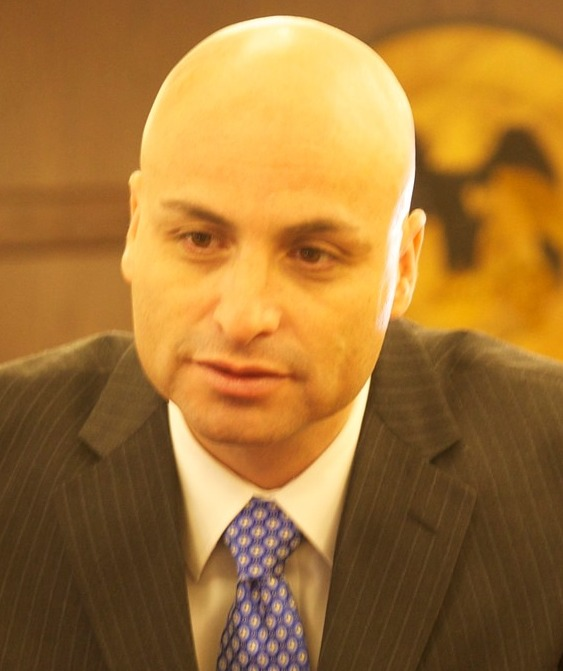

Nominee	Hector Balderas	Michael Hendricks
Party	Democratic	Republican
Popular vote	427,583	231,296
Percentage	61.8%	33.4%
- County results Balderas: 40–50% 50–60% 60–70% 70–80% 80–90% Hendricks: 40-50% 50–60% 60–70%
Attorney General before election
Hector Balderas
Democratic
Elected Attorney General
Hector Balderas
Democratic

The 2018 New Mexico Attorney General election was held on November 6, 2018, to elect the attorney general of the U.S. state of New Mexico.

Incumbent Democratic attorney general Hector Balderas ran for a second term.

=== Republican primary ===
Republican primary results
Party	Candidate	Votes	%
Republican	Michael Hendricks	66,588	100.0
Total votes		66,588	100.0

=== Democratic primary ===
Democratic primary results
Party	Candidate	Votes	%
Democratic	Hector Balderas (incumbent)	150,515	100.0
Total votes		150,515	100.0

=== Libertarian primary ===
Libertarian primary results
Party	Candidate	Votes	%
Libertarian	A. Blair Dunn	608	100.0
Total votes		608	100.0

=== General election ===
New Mexico Attorney General election, 2018
Party	Candidate	Votes	%
Democratic	Hector Balderas (incumbent)	427,583	61.8
Republican	Michael Hendricks	231,296	33.4
Libertarian	A. Blair Dunn	32,931	4.8
Total votes		691,810	100.0
Democratic hold			

== New York ==
2018 New York Attorney General election
- November 6, 2018
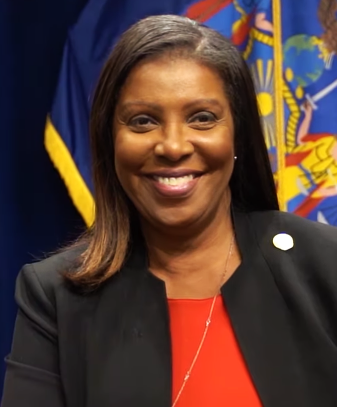
Nominee	Letitia James	Keith Wofford
Party	Democratic	Republican
Alliance	Parties: Working Families; Independence	Parties: Conservative
Popular vote	3,739,239	2,108,600
Percentage	62.4%	35.2%
- Results by county James: 40–50% 50–60% 60–70% 70–80% 80–90% >90% Wofford: 40–50% 50–60% 60–70% 70–80%
Attorney General before election
Barbara Underwood
Democratic
Elected Attorney General
Letitia James
Democratic

The 2018 New York Attorney General election took place on November 6, 2018.

New York City Public Advocate Letitia James, a Democrat, was elected. James is the first woman and the first African-American to be elected New York attorney general.

Former Attorney General Eric Schneiderman resigned on May 8, 2018, after allegations of domestic abuse and withdrew from his then-ongoing reelection campaign. Incumbent Solicitor General Barbara Underwood was chosen by the Legislature to complete her unexpired term, but opted not to seek election to a full term.

On September 13, 2018, James won the Democratic nomination for attorney general, defeating Leecia Eve, former senior policy advisor to U.S. Senator Hillary Clinton; Sean Patrick Maloney, U.S. Representative for New York's 18th congressional district; and Zephyr Teachout, professor at Fordham University School of Law. In the general election, James defeated Republican Party candidate Keith Wofford with over 60% of the vote.

In the general election, James carried every county won by Andrew Cuomo in the concurrent gubernatorial election as well as Franklin, Clinton, Essex, Orange, Duchess, Columbia, Broome, Cortland and Schenectady counties.

=== Democratic primary ===
Democratic primary results
Party	Candidate	Votes	%
Democratic	Letitia James	608,308	38.53%
Democratic	Zephyr Teachout	468,083	29.65%
Democratic	Sean Patrick Maloney	379,099	24.02%
Democratic	Leecia Eve	52,367	3.32%
Total votes		1,578,588	100.0%

=== Reform primary ===
Reform primary results
Party	Candidate	Votes	%
Reform	Nancy Sliwa	13,643	53.3
Reform	Michael Diederich, Jr.	6,005	23.5
Reform	Christopher B. Garvey	5,949	23.2
Total votes		25,597	100.0

=== General election ===
New York Attorney General election, 2018
Party	Candidate	Votes	%	±%
Democratic	Letitia James	3,497,213	58.38%	+12.89%
Working Families	Letitia James	152,350	2.54%	−1.79%
Independence	Letitia James	89,676	1.50%	−1.33%
Total	Letitia James	3,739,239	62.42%	+9.77%
Republican	Keith Wofford	1,851,510	30.91%	−1.68%
Conservative	Keith Wofford	257,090	4.29%	−2.31%
Total	Keith Wofford	2,108,600	35.20%	−4.24%
Green	Michael Sussman	72,512	1.21%	−0.85%
Libertarian	Christopher Garvey	43,767	0.73%	+0.10%
Reform	Nancy Sliwa	26,441	0.44%	N/A
Total votes		5,990,559	100.0%	N/A
Democratic hold				

== North Dakota ==
2018 North Dakota Attorney General election
- November 6, 2018
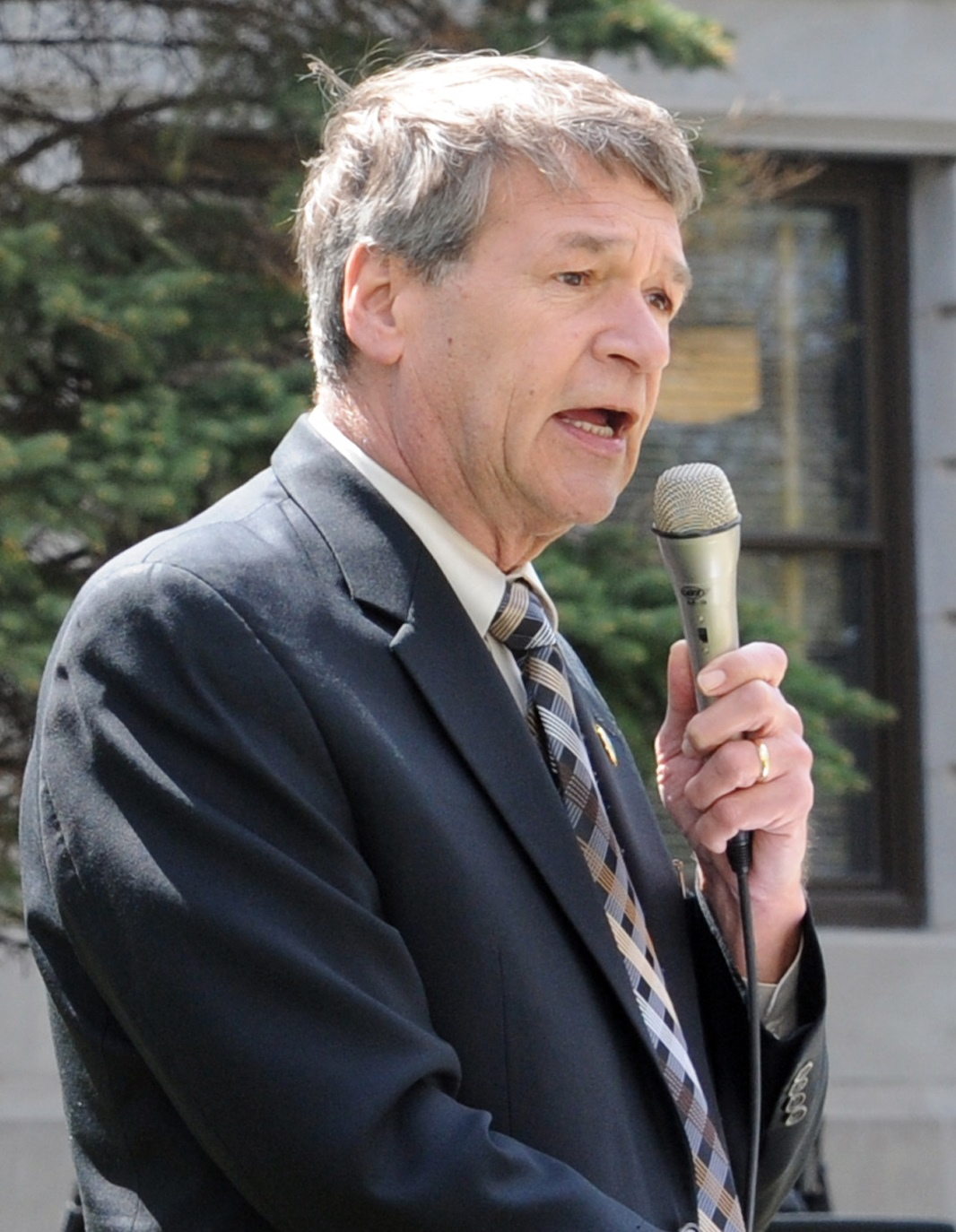

Nominee	Wayne Stenehjem	David Clark Thompson
Party	Republican	Democratic–NPL
Popular vote	215,633	102,869
Percentage	67.55%	32.23%
- County results Stenehjem: 40-50% 50-60% 60-70% 70-80% 80-90% Thompson: 60–70% 70–80%
Attorney General before election
Wayne Stenehjem
Republican
Elected Attorney General
Wayne Stenehjem
Republican

The 2018 North Dakota Attorney General election took place on November 6, 2018, to elect the Attorney General of North Dakota.

Incumbent Republican attorney general Wayne Stenehjem won re-election against his Democratic-NPL challenger, trial attorney David Thompson.

=== Primary election ===
Nonpartisan primary results
Party	Candidate	Votes	%
Republican	Wayne Stenehjem	63,839	67.5
Democratic	David Thompson	32,217	33.5
Republican hold			

=== General election ===
North Dakota Attorney General election, 2018
Party	Candidate	Votes	%
Republican	Wayne Stenehjem	215,633	67.6
Democratic	David Thompson	102,869	32.2
Republican hold			

== Ohio ==
2018 Ohio Attorney General election
- November 6, 2018
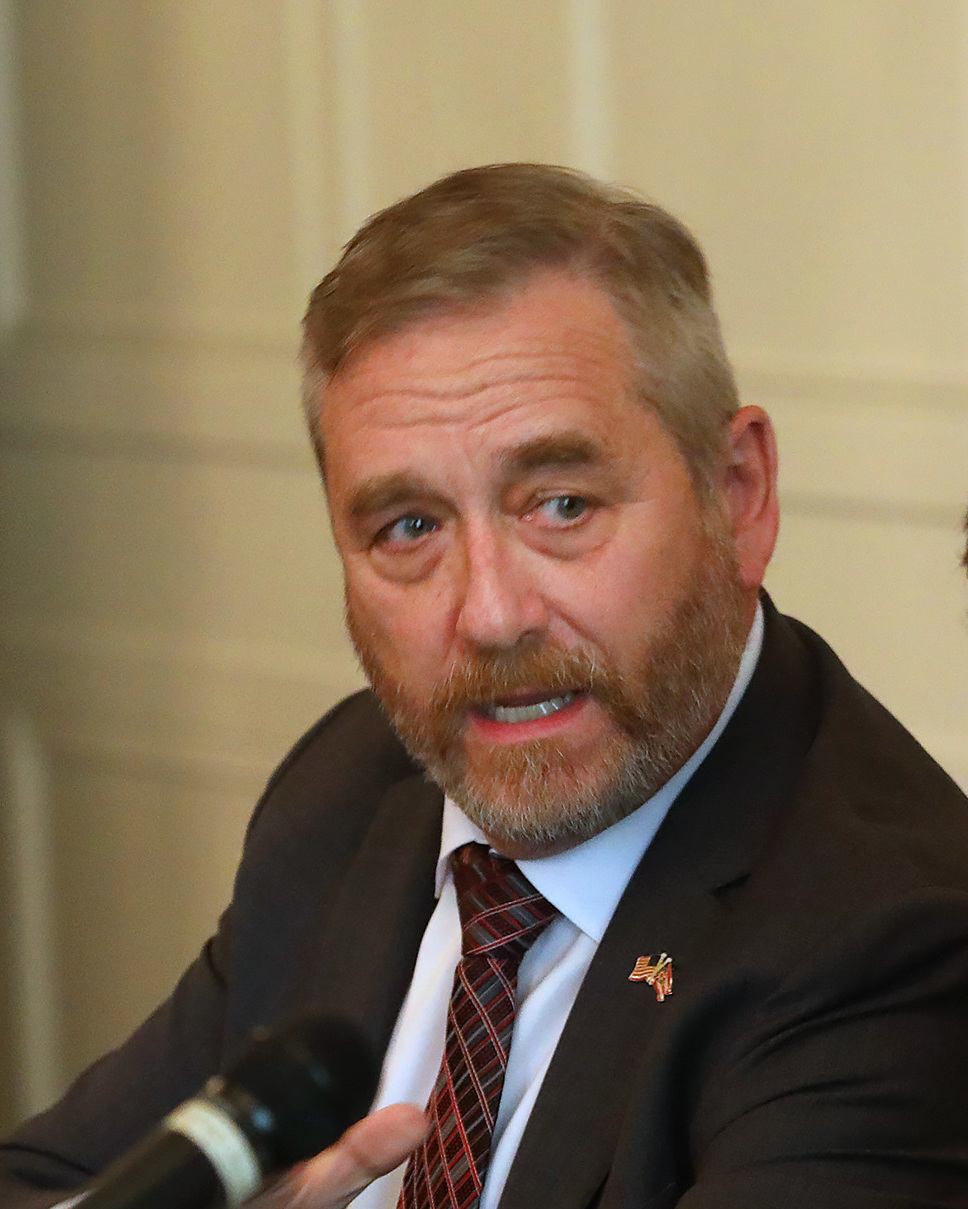

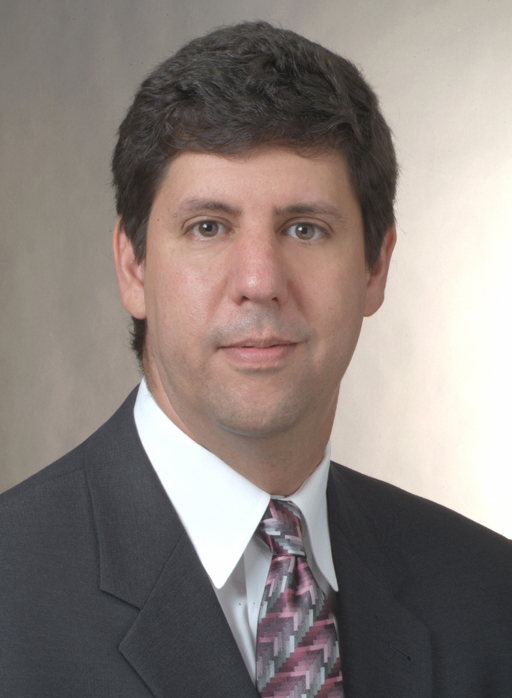
Nominee	Dave Yost	Steve Dettelbach
Party	Republican	Democratic
Popular vote	2,272,440	2,084,593
Percentage	52.2%	47.8%
- County results Yost: 50-60% 60-70% 70-80% 80-90% Dettelbach: 50–60% 60–70%
Attorney General before election
Mike DeWine
Republican
Elected Attorney General
Dave Yost
Republican

The 2018 Ohio Attorney General election took place on November 6, 2018, to elect the Attorney General of Ohio.

Incumbent Republican attorney general Mike DeWine was term-limited and cannot run for a third term as attorney general. DeWine instead ran for governor.

=== Republican primary ===
Republican primary results
Party	Candidate	Votes	%
Republican	Dave Yost	642,717	100.0
Total votes		642,717	100.0

=== Democratic primary ===
Democratic primary results
Party	Candidate	Votes	%
Democratic	Steve Dettelbach	510,741	100.0
Total votes		510,741	100.0

=== General election ===
Ohio Attorney General election, 2018
Party	Candidate	Votes	%
Republican	Dave Yost	2,272,440	52.2
Democratic	Steve Dettelbach	2,084,593	47.8
Total votes		4,357,033	100.0
Republican hold			

== Oklahoma ==
2018 Oklahoma Attorney General election
- November 6, 2018
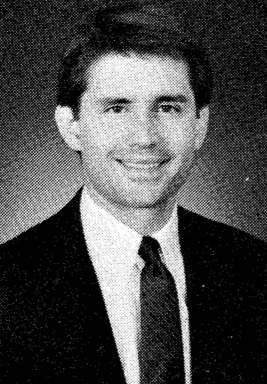
Nominee	Michael J. Hunter	Mark Myles
Party	Republican	Democratic
Popular vote	750,769	421,599
Percentage	64.03%	35.97%
- County results Hunter: 50–60% 60–70% 70–80% 80–90%
Attorney General before election
Scott Pruitt
Republican
Elected Attorney General
Michael J. Hunter
Democratic

The 2018 Oklahoma Attorney General election took place on November 6, 2018, to elect the attorney general of Oklahoma.

Incumbent Republican attorney general Scott Pruitt was term-limited and could not run for a third term. Pruitt resigned on February 17, 2017, upon being confirmed as Administrator of the Environmental Protection Agency.

=== Republican primary ===
Republican primary results August 26, 2018
Party	Candidate	Votes	%
Republican	Mike Hunter	191,324	44.5
Republican	Gentner Drummond	165,479	38.5
Republican	Angela Bonilla	73,514	17.1
Total votes		430,317	100.00

==== Runoff ====
Republican primary runoff results August 28, 2018
Party	Candidate	Votes	%
Republican	Mike Hunter	148,354	50.2
Republican	Gentner Drummond	142,990	49.8
Total votes		286,931	100.00

=== General election ===
2018 Attorney General, Oklahoma
Party	Candidate	Votes	%	±%
Republican	Michael J. Hunter	750,769	64.03%	−35.97
Democratic	Mark Myles	421,699	35.97%	
Majority		329,070	28.06%	
Turnout		1,172,468		

== Rhode Island ==
2018 Rhode Island Attorney General election
- November 6, 2018
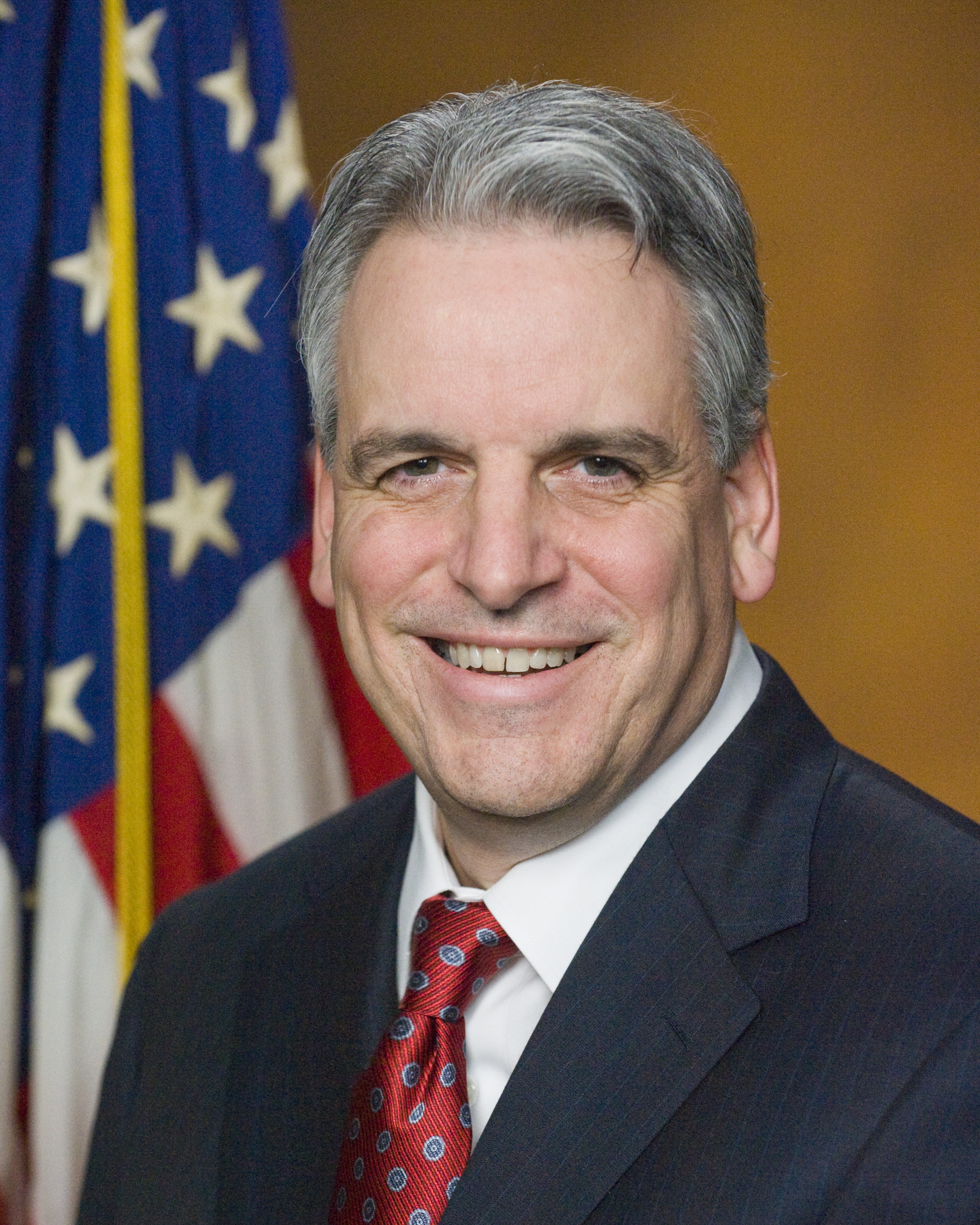

Nominee	Peter Neronha	Alan Gordon
Party	Democratic	Compassion
Popular vote	274,350	65,674
Percentage	79.8%	19.1%
- Neronha: 60–70% 70–80% 80–90% >90%
Attorney General before election
Peter Kilmartin
Democratic
Elected Attorney General
Peter Neronha
Democratic

The 2018 Rhode Island Attorney General election took place on November 6, 2018, to elect the attorney general of Rhode Island.

Incumbent Democratic attorney general Peter Kilmartin was term-limited and could not run for a third term in office.

=== Democratic primary ===
Democratic primary results
Party	Candidate	Votes	%
Democratic	Peter F. Neronha	91,273	100.0
Total votes		91,273	100.0

=== General election ===
Rhode Island Attorney General election, 2018
Party	Candidate	Votes	%
Democratic	Peter Neronha	274,350	79.8
Compassion	Alan Gordon	65,674	19.1
	Write-ins	3,657	1.1
Total votes		343,681	

== South Carolina ==
2018 South Carolina Attorney General election
- November 6, 2018
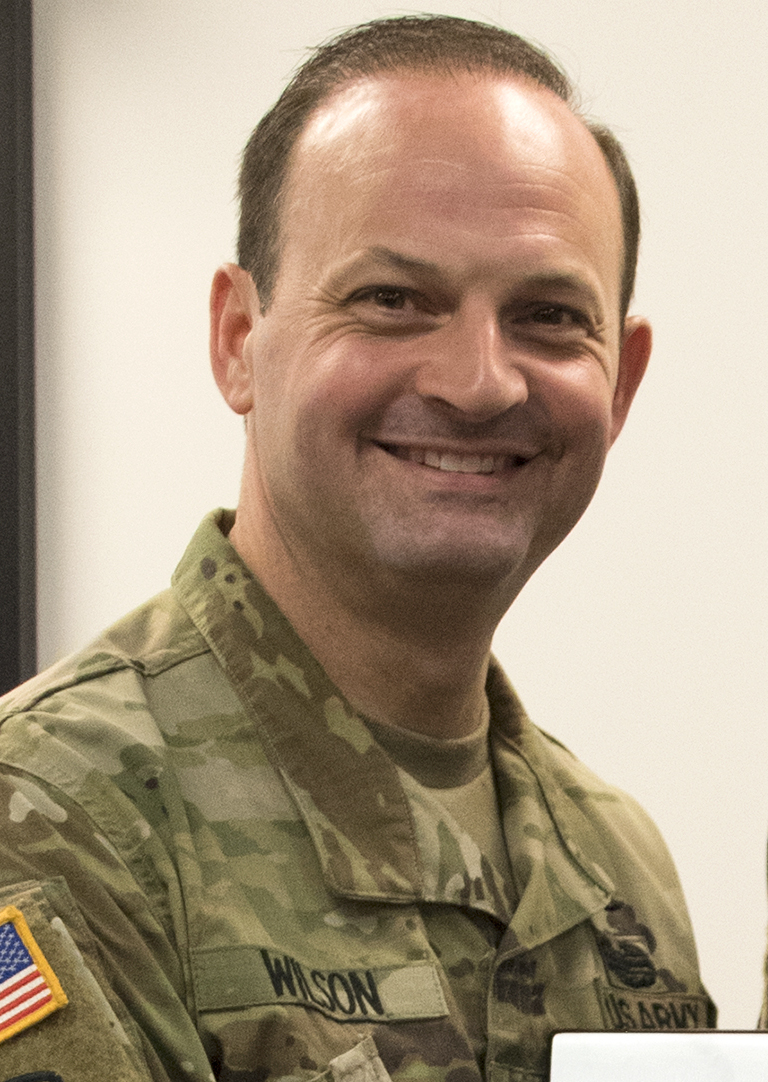
Nominee	Alan Wilson	Constance Anastopoulo
Party	Republican	Democratic
Popular vote	938,032	764,806
Percentage	55.05%	44.88%
- County results Wilson: 50–60% 60–70% 70–80% Anastopoulo: 50–60% 60–70% 70–80%
Attorney General before election
Alan Wilson
Republican
Elected Attorney General
Alan Wilson
Republican

The 2018 South Carolina Attorney General election took place on November 6, 2018, to elect the attorney general of South Carolina.

Incumbent Republican attorney general Alan Wilson won re-election to a third term.

Other Republican candidates included State Representative Todd Atwater, like Wilson, from Lexington and Greenville attorney William Herlong.

=== Republican primary ===
Republican primary results
Party	Candidate	Votes	%
Republican	Alan Wilson	166,860	48.6
Republican	Todd Atwater	102,038	29.7
Republican	William Herlong	74,199	21.6
Total votes		343,097	100.00

==== Runoff ====
Republican primary runoff results
Party	Candidate	Votes	%
Republican	Alan Wilson	213,538	65.0
Republican	Todd Atwater	115,133	35.0
Total votes		328,671	100.00

=== General election ===
South Carolina Attorney General election, 2018
Party	Candidate	Votes	%
Republican	Alan Wilson	938,032	55.1
Democratic	Constance Anastopoulo	764,806	44.9
n/a	Write-ins	996	0.1
Total votes		1,703,834	100.0
Republican hold			

== South Dakota ==
South Dakota attorney general election, 2018
- November 6, 2018
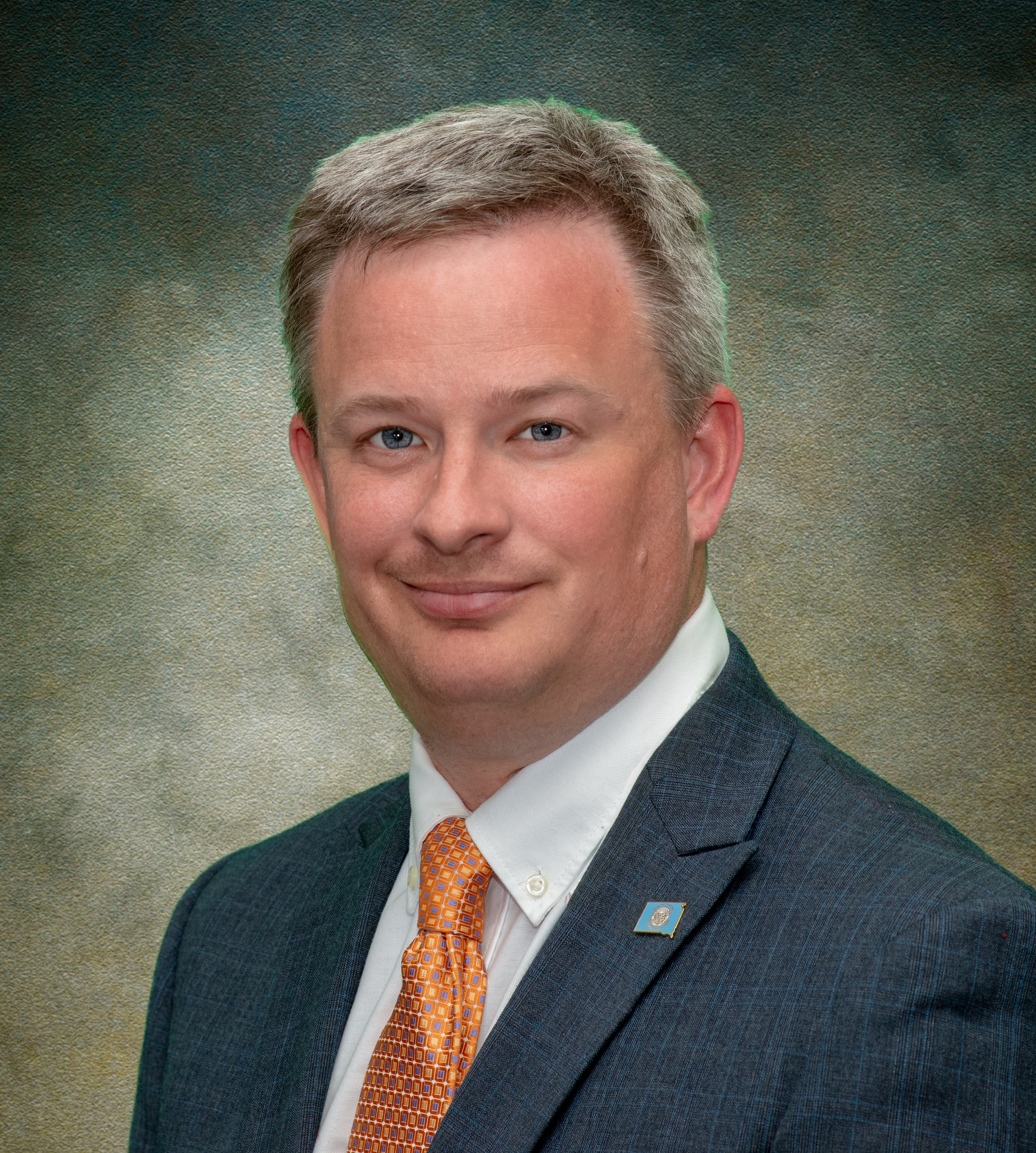

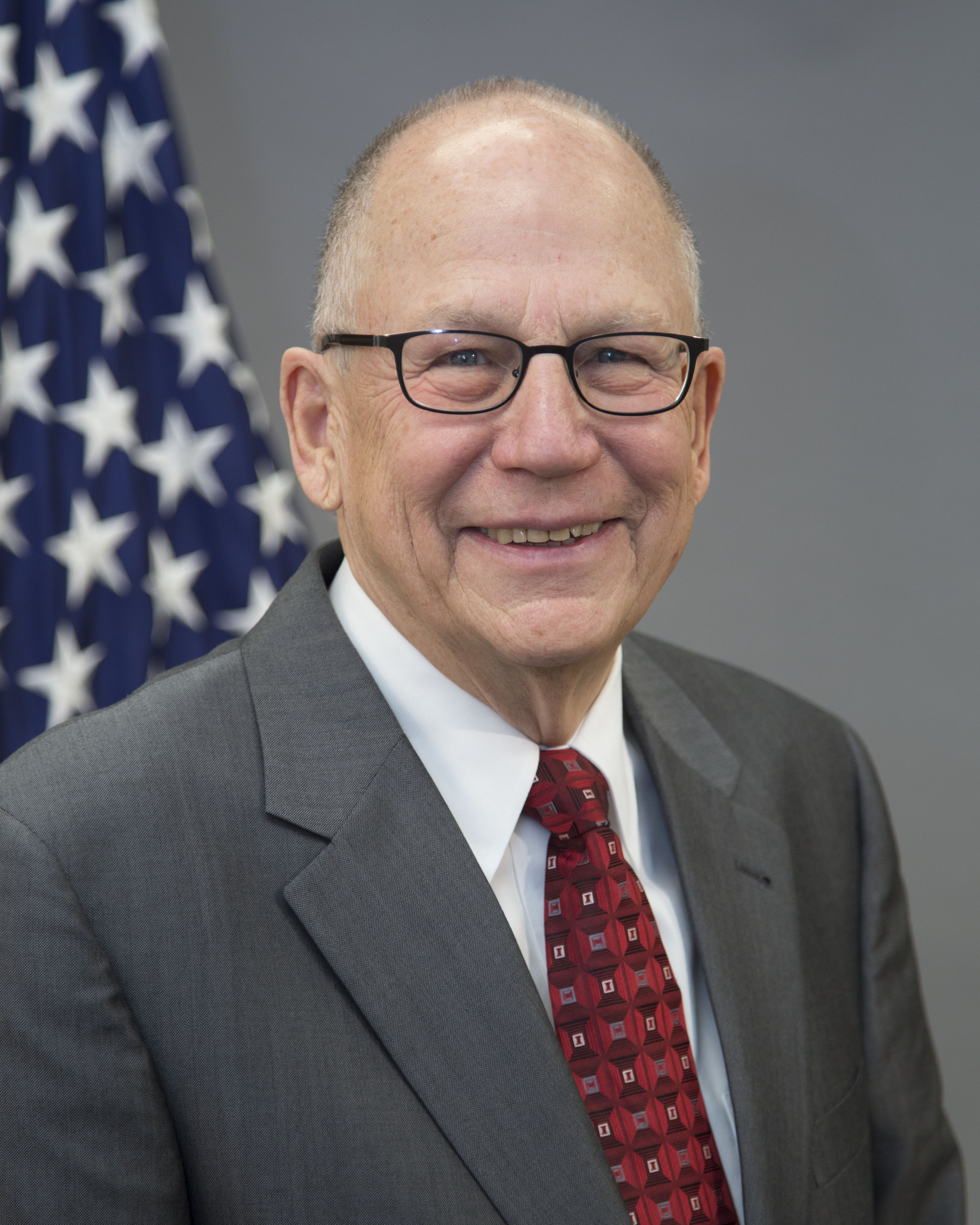
Nominee	Jason Ravnsborg	Randy Seiler
Party	Republican	Democratic
Popular vote	179,071	145,558
Percentage	55.16%	44.84%
- County results Ravnsborg: 50–60% 60–70% 70–80% 80–90% Seiler: 50–60% 60–70% 70–80% >90%
Attorney General before election
Marty Jackley
Republican
Elected Attorney General
Jason Ravnsborg
Republican

The 2018 South Dakota attorney general election was held on November 6, 2018.

Incumbent Attorney General Marty Jackley was term-limited and ran for governor of South Dakota. In June 2018, the South Dakota Republican party nominated Jason Ravnsborg for attorney general and the Democratic party nominated Randy Seiler. Ravnsborg won the election to become the 31st attorney general of South Dakota.

=== Republican convention ===
South Dakota Attorney General, Republican Convention Election 2018, Final Round
Party	Candidate	%
Republican	Jason Ravnsborg	63%
Republican	Lance Russell	37%

South Dakota Attorney General, Republican Convention Election 2018, First Round
Party	Candidate	%
Republican	Jason Ravnsborg	47%
Republican	Lance Russell	27%
Republican	John Fitzgerald	26%

=== General election ===
2018 South Dakota Attorney General election
Party	Candidate	Votes	%	±%
Republican	Jason Ravnsborg	179,071	55.16%	−5.07%
Democratic	Randy Seiler	145,558	44.84%	+12.26%
Total votes		324,629	100.0%	N/A
Republican hold				

== Texas ==
2018 Texas Attorney General election
- November 6, 2018
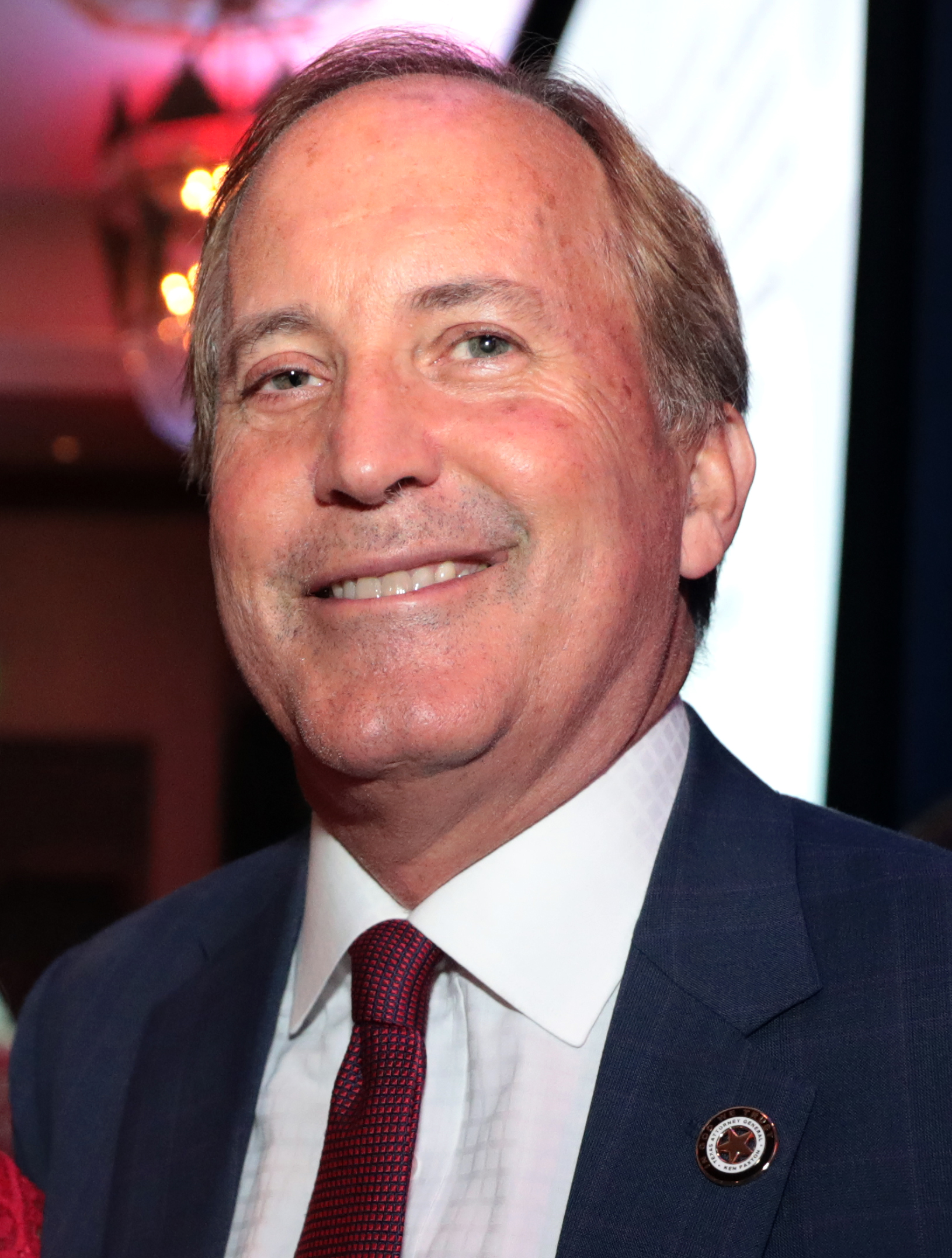

Nominee	Ken Paxton	Justin Nelson
Party	Republican	Democratic
Popular vote	4,193,207	3,898,098
Percentage	50.57%	47.01%
- County results Paxton: 40–50% 50–60% 60–70% 70–80% 80–90% 90–100% Nelson: 40–50% 50–60% 60–70% 70–80%
Attorney General before election
Ken Paxton
Republican
Elected Attorney General
Ken Paxton
Republican

The 2018 Texas Attorney General election took place on November 6, 2018, to elect the attorney general of Texas.

Incumbent Republican attorney general Ken Paxton won re-election to a second term.

=== Republican primary ===
Republican primary results
Party	Candidate	Votes	%	±%
Republican	Ken Paxton (incumbent)	1,312,172	100%	+55.55%
Total votes		1,312,172	100%	+32,112
Turnout			8.6%	−0.81%'"`UNIQ−−ref−000002D2−QINU`"'

=== Democratic primary ===
Democratic primary results
Party	Candidate	Votes	%	±%
Democratic	Justin Nelson	884,376	100%	
Total votes		884,376	100%	+446,858
Turnout			5.79%	+2.57%'"`UNIQ−−ref−000002DC−QINU`"'

=== General election ===
General election results
Party	Candidate	Votes	%	±%
Republican	Ken Paxton (incumbent)	4,193,207	50.57%	−8.23%
Democratic	Justin Nelson	3,898,098	47.01%	+8.99%
Libertarian	Michael Ray Harris	201,310	2.43%	−0.10%
Total votes		8,292,615	100%	

== Vermont ==
The 2018 Vermont Attorney General election took place on November 6, 2018, to elect the attorney general of Vermont.

Incumbent Democratic attorney general T. J. Donovan (since 2017) was elected to a second term.

=== Republican primary ===
Republican primary results
Party	Candidate	Votes	%
Republican	H. Brooke Paige	16,853	90.9
Republican	Write-ins	1,690	9.1
Republican	Blank/overvotes	18,444	
Total votes		18,543	100%

=== Democratic primary ===
Democratic primary results
Party	Candidate	Votes	%
Democratic	T.J. Donovan (incumbent)	58,714	99.4
Democratic	Write-ins	354	0.6
Democratic	Blank/overvotes	10,939	
Total votes		59,068	100%

=== General election ===
Vermont Attorney General election, 2018
Party	Candidate	Votes	%
Democratic	T.J. Donovan (incumbent)	187,093	67.24
Republican	Janssen Willhoit	70,226	25.24
Liberty Union	Rosemarie Jackowski	9,536	3.43
	Write-ins	166	0.06
	Overvotes	96	N/A
	Blank votes	11,113	N/A
Total votes		278,230	

== Wisconsin ==
2018 Wisconsin Attorney General election
- November 6, 2018
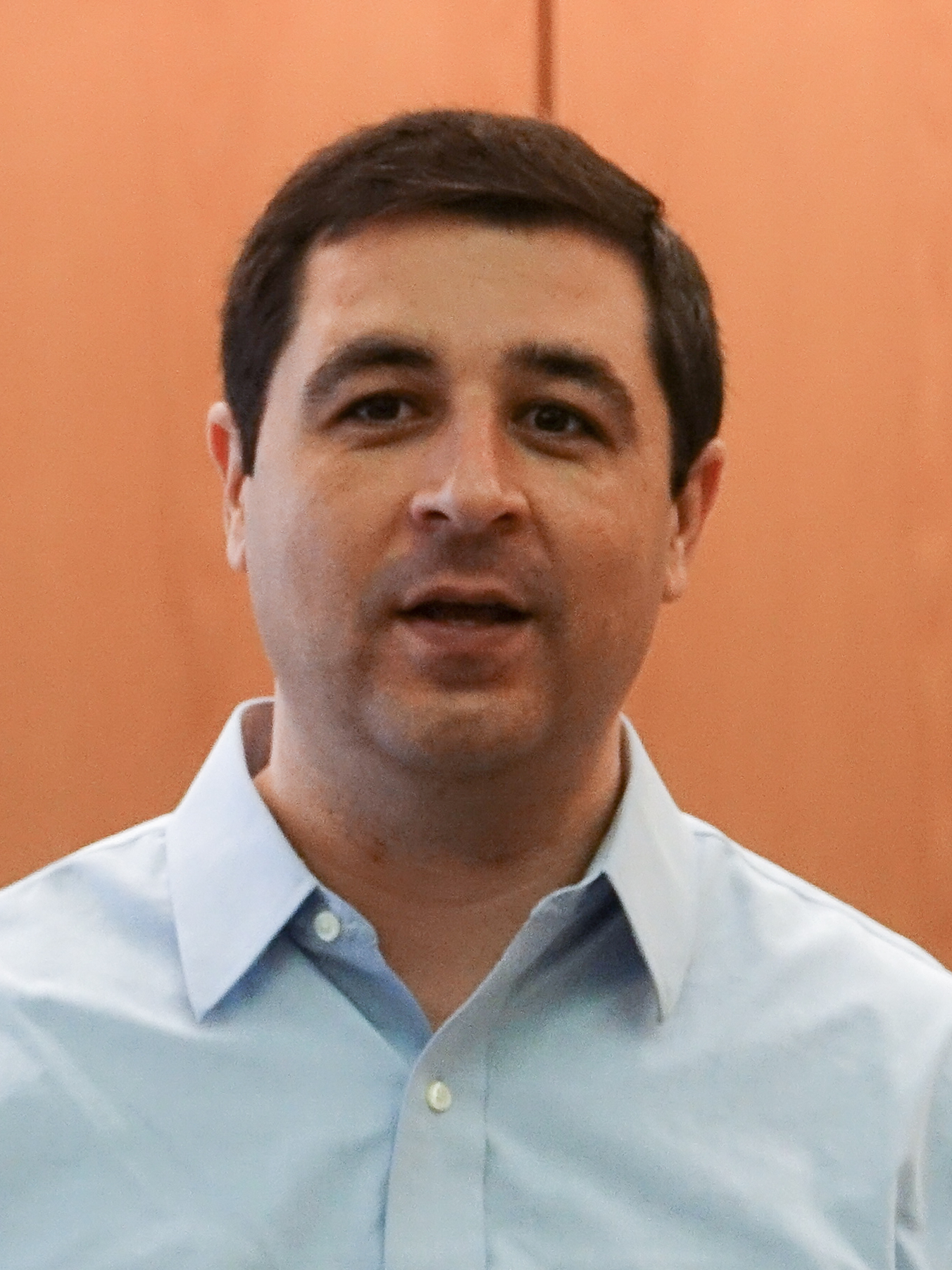

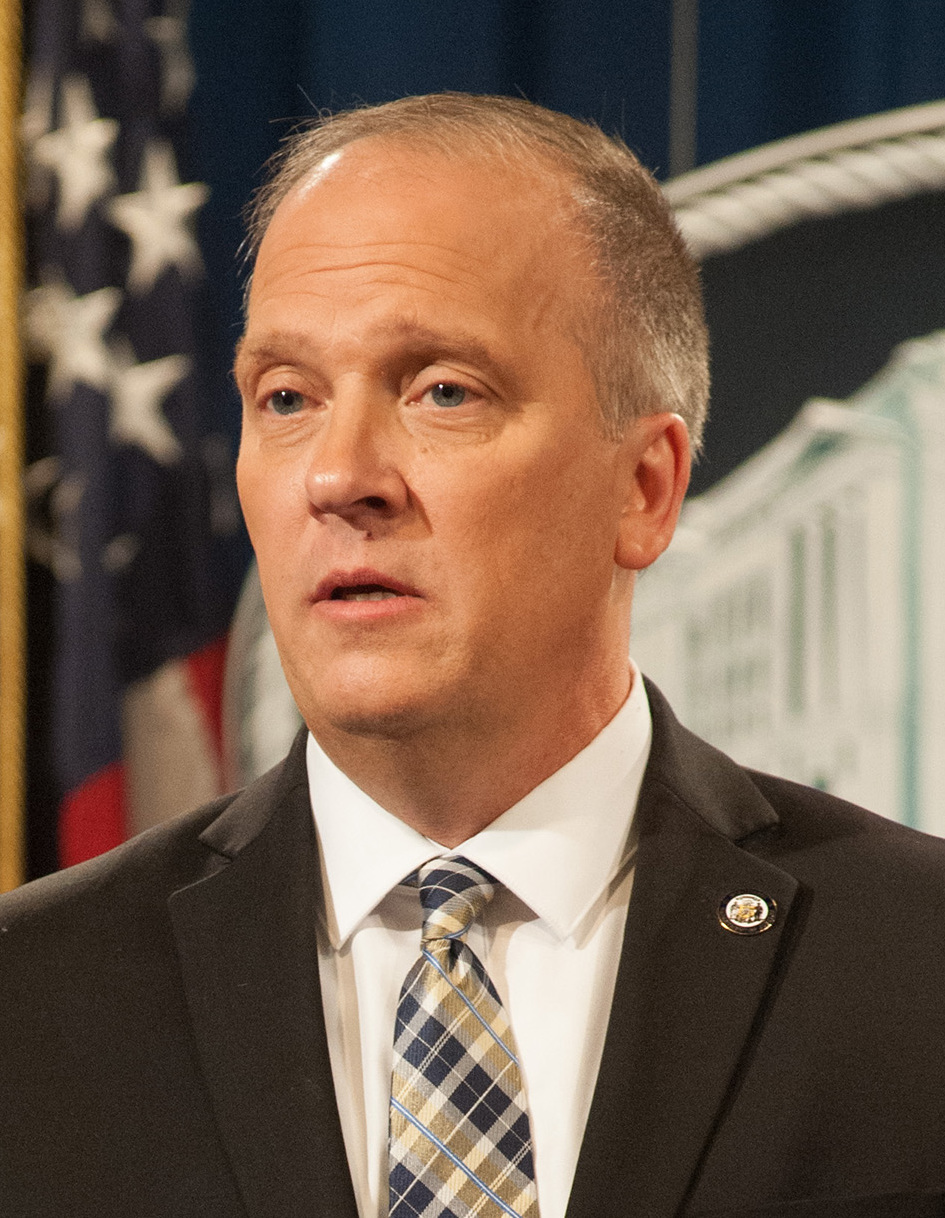
Nominee	Josh Kaul	Brad Schimel
Party	Democratic	Republican
Popular vote	1,305,902	1,288,712
Percentage	49.4%	48.8%
- County results Kaul: 40–50% 50–60% 60–70% 70–80% Schimel: 40–50% 50–60% 60–70% 70–80%
Attorney General before election
Brad Schimel
Republican
Elected Attorney General
Josh Kaul
Democratic

The 2018 Wisconsin Attorney General election took place on November 6, 2018, to elect the attorney general of Wisconsin.

Republican incumbent Brad Schimel, first elected in 2014, ran for a second term. Voting rights attorney and former federal prosecutor Josh Kaul, the Democratic nominee, defeated Schimel in the general election. Terry Larson, the Constitution Party nominee, also garnered around 2% of the vote, greater than the vote difference between Schimel and Kaul.

=== General election ===
Wisconsin Attorney General election, 2018
Party	Candidate	Votes	%
Democratic	Josh Kaul	1,305,902	49.4
Republican	Brad Schimel (incumbent)	1,288,712	48.8
Constitution	Terry Larson	47,038	1.8
Write-in		1,199	0.0
Total votes		2,642,851	100.0
Democratic gain from Republican			

== Territories and federal district ==
=== District of Columbia ===
2018 District of Columbia Attorney General election
- November 6, 2018
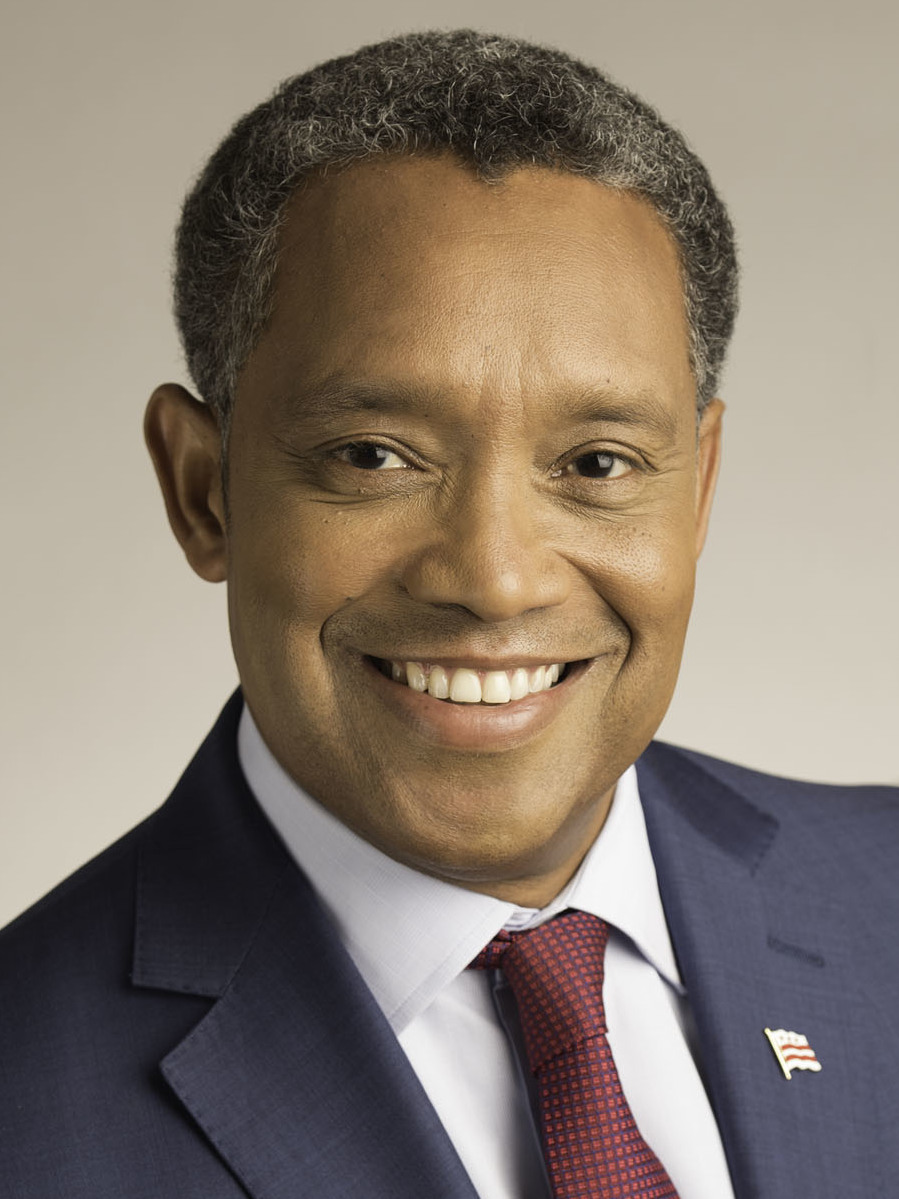

Candidate	Karl Racine	Joe Bishop-Henchman
Party	Democratic	Libertarian
Popular vote	207,451	14,941
Percentage	92.77%	6.68%
- Ward results Racine: 80–90% >90%
Attorney General before election
Karl Racine
Democratic
Elected Attorney General
Karl Racine
Democratic

The 2018 District of Columbia Attorney General election was held on November 6, 2018, to elect the attorney general of Washington, D.C. This was the second ever attorney general election in D.C. history.

Incumbent attorney general Democrat Karl Racine handily won re-election.

==== General election ====
2018 District of Columbia Attorney General election
Party	Candidate	Votes	%
Democratic	Karl Racine (incumbent)	207,451	92.77
Libertarian	Joe Henchman	14,941	6.68
Write-In	Other	1,233	0.55
Total votes		223,625	100%

=== Guam ===
The 2018 Guam Attorney General election was held on November 6, 2018, to elect the attorney general of Guam.

In a primary election on August 25, 2018, Leevin Camacho garnered the most votes (nearly 50%) despite accusations of inexperience from his opponents. He went on to win the general election against Douglas Moylan in November.

==== Primary election ====
Primary election results for Attorney General of Guam, 2018
Party	Candidate	Votes	%
Nonpartisan	Leevin Camacho	14,344	46.85
Republican	Douglas Moylan	7,951	25.97
Democratic	Gary Gumataotao	7,298	23.83
—	write-ins	87	0.28
Total votes		30,619	100.00

==== General election ====
General election results for Attorney General of Guam, 2018
Party	Candidate	Votes	%
Nonpartisan	Leevin Camacho	24,001	64.20
Republican	Douglas Moylan	11,427	30.56
—	write-ins	80	0.21
Total votes		37,386	100.00
Nonpartisan gain from Republican			

=== Northern Mariana Islands ===
The 2018 Northern Mariana Islands Attorney General election was held on November 6, 2018, to elect the attorney general of the Northern Mariana Islands.

Democratic incumbent Edward Manibusan won re-election with one-hundred percent of the vote as a nonpartisan candidate.

==== General election ====
General election results for Attorney General of the Northern Mariana Islands, 2018
Party	Candidate	Votes	%
Nonpartisan	Edward Manibusan	11,366	100.00
