= Marcus Conklin =

American politician

Member of the Nevada State Assembly from the 37th district
- In office November 6, 2002 – November 7, 2012
- Preceded by: Greg Brower
- Succeeded by: Wesley Duncan

Personal details
- Born: November 1, 1969 (age 56) Hanford, California
- Party: Democratic

Marcus Conklin (born November 1, 1969) is an American politician who served in the Nevada State Assembly from the 37th district from 2002 to 2012.
