= 2018 Nevada Attorney General election =

- November 6, 2018
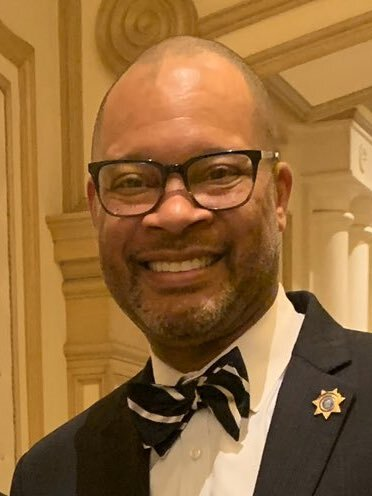

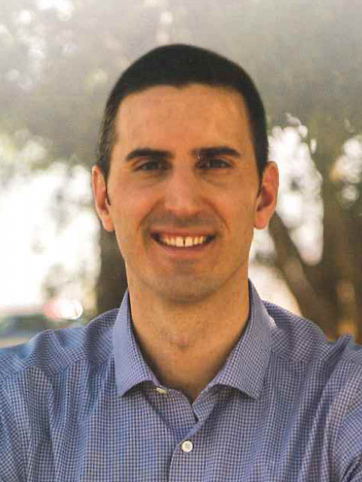
Nominee	Aaron Ford	Wesley Duncan
Party	Democratic	Republican
Popular vote	456,225	451,692
Percentage	47.24%	46.77%
- Ford: 40–50% 50–60% 60–70% Duncan: 40–50% 50–60% 60–70% 70–80% 80–90%
Attorney General before election
Adam Laxalt
Republican
Elected Attorney General
Aaron Ford
Democratic

The 2018 Nevada Attorney General election took place on November 6, 2018, to elect the attorney general of Nevada.

Incumbent Republican Attorney General Adam Laxalt did not run for re-election to a second term and instead ran unsuccessfully for governor. Nevada Senate Majority Leader Aaron Ford won the Democratic nomination and defeated Republican nominee and former Nevada Assembly member Wesley Duncan in the general election. With a margin of 0.47%, this was the closest attorney general race of the 2018 election cycle.

== Republican primary ==
=== Candidates ===
==== Declared ====
- Wesley Duncan, assistant Nevada Attorney General
- Craig Mueller, lawyer and former U.S. Naval officer

==== Declined ====
- Mark Amodei, incumbent U.S. representative for Nevada's 2nd congressional district
- Adam Laxalt, incumbent Nevada attorney general

=== Results ===
Republican primary results
Party	Candidate	Votes	%
Republican	Wesley Duncan	82,453	59.78
Republican	Craig Mueller	43,361	31.44
None of These Candidates		12,106	8.78
Total votes		137,920	100.0

== Democratic primary ==
=== Candidates ===
==== Declared ====
- Aaron Ford, majority leader of the Nevada Senate
- Stuart MacKie

==== Declined ====
- Steve Wolfson, Clark County District Attorney (ran for re-election and won)

=== Results ===
Democratic primary results
Party	Candidate	Votes	%
Democratic	Aaron Ford	94,699	68.01
Democratic	Stuart MacKie	26,619	19.12
None of These Candidates		17,931	12.88
Total votes		139,249	100.0

== General election ==
=== Predictions ===
Source	Ranking	As of
Governing	Tossup	October 26, 2018

=== Polling ===
Poll source	Date(s) administered	Sample size (Note: Key: A – all adults RV – registered voters LV – likely voters V – unclear)	Margin of error	Wesley Duncan (R)	Aaron Ford (D)	Other	Undecided
Suffolk University/Reno Gazette Journal	September 5–10, 2018	500 (LV)	± 4.4%	28%	30%	13% (Note: Joel Hansen (IAPN) with 10%; None of these candidates with 2%; Refused with 1%)	29%
The Mellman Group (D) (Note: Poll sponsored by The Nevada Independent)	April 12–19, 2018	600 (V)	± 4.0%	27%	36%	–	37%

=== Results ===
Ford won the election by a 0.47% margin.

General election results
Party	Candidate	Votes	%	±%
Democratic	Aaron Ford	456,225	47.24	+1.92
Republican	Wesley Duncan	451,692	46.77	+0.55
Independent American	Joel Hansen	32,259	3.34	–2.27
None of These Candidates		25,577	2.65	–0.22
Total votes		965,753	100.0	
Democratic gain from Republican		Swing		

==== By congressional district ====
Ford won two of four congressional districts, with the remaining two going to Duncan, including one that elected a Democrat.

District	Duncan	Ford	Representative
1st	33%	61%	Dina Titus
2nd	54%	38%	Mark Amodei
3rd	48%	47%	Susie Lee
4th	45%	49%	Steven Horsford

== See also ==
- 2018 United States attorney general elections
- 2018 Nevada elections

== Notes ==
Partisan clients
