= Wesley Duncan =

American politician

Wes Duncan
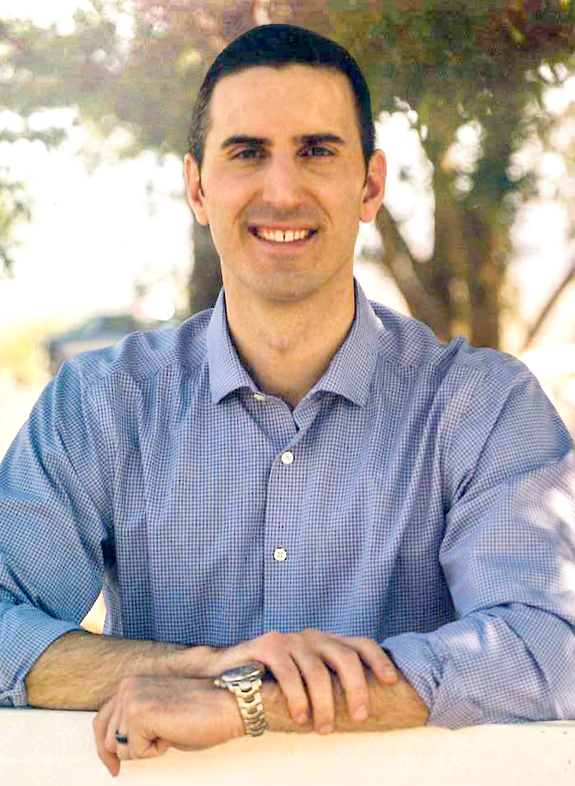

Member of the Nevada Assembly from the 37th district
- In office February 4, 2013 – December 4, 2014
- Preceded by: Marcus Conklin
- Succeeded by: Glenn E. Trowbridge

Personal details
- Born: Wesley Karl Duncan; December 26, 1980 (age 45) Sonora, California, U.S.
- Party: Republican
- Spouse: Jennifer Duncan
- Children: 3
- Education: Columbia College, California (attended); University of California, Berkeley (BA); Ohio State University (JD)
- Website: Campaign website

Military service
- Allegiance: United States
- Branch/service: United States Air Force
- Years of service: 2007–present
- Rank: Lieutenant Colonel

Wesley Karl Duncan (born December 26, 1980) is an American attorney and politician. A member of the Republican Party, he served one term in the Nevada Assembly representing the 37th district from 2013 until 2014 after he resigned for a job with attorney general of Nevada Adam Laxalt, working as his first assistant from 2014 – 2017 When Laxalt did not run for a second term, Duncan entered the 2018 election to become attorney general, winning in the primary but losing to Nevada Senator Aaron Ford.

After working for the attorney general, Duncan worked as an attorney in the Washoe County district attorney office and city attorney office of Sparks, Nevada. In 2022, he was appointed the city council of Sparks to become its 17th city attorney to fill the remainin two years of Chet Adam's term to the elected office.

In 2025, Duncan announced his intention to run to unseat the longtime incumbent Washoe district attorney, Chris Hicks.

Duncan serves as a judge advocate as a lieutenant colonel in the United States Air Force Reserve with the 926th Wing of Nellis Air Force Base, and was a veteran of the Iraq War. Duncan won the Republician Primary for Washoe County District Attorney on June 7, 2026, beating Incumbent Hicks, and is expected to win the General Election in November of 2026.
