= 2018 Nevada gubernatorial election =

- November 6, 2018
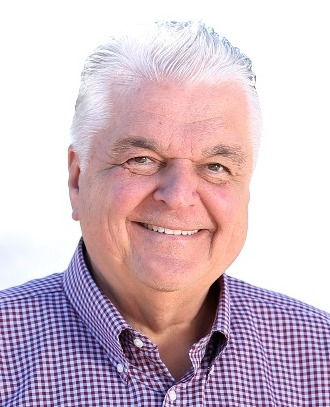

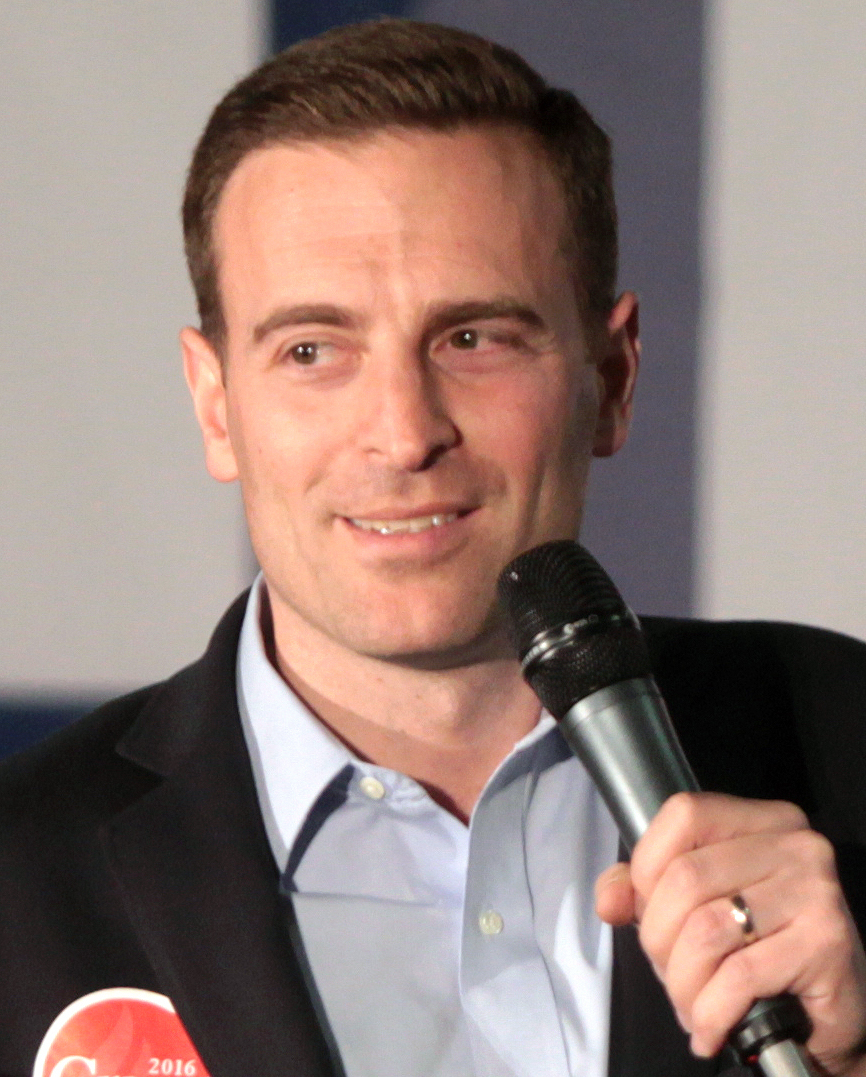
Nominee	Steve Sisolak	Adam Laxalt
Party	Democratic	Republican
Popular vote	480,007	440,320
Percentage	49.39%	45.31%
- Sisolak: 40–50% 50–60% 60–70% 70–80% 80–90% >90% Laxalt: 40–50% 50–60% 60–70% 70–80% 80–90% >90% Lord: >90% Tie: 40–50% 50% No votes
Governor before election
Brian Sandoval
Republican
Elected Governor
Steve Sisolak
Democratic

The 2018 Nevada gubernatorial election took place on November 6, 2018, to elect the next governor of Nevada. Incumbent Republican governor Brian Sandoval was ineligible to run for re-election due to the absolute two-term limit established by the Nevada Constitution. Nevada is one of eight U.S. states (or nine U.S. states and territory) that prohibits its governors or any other state and territorial executive branch officials from serving more than two terms, even if they are nonconsecutive.

The candidate filing deadline was March 16, 2018 and the primary election was held on June 12, 2018. The Republican nominee was Adam Laxalt and the Democratic nominee was Steve Sisolak. Sisolak won the election, becoming the first Democrat to be elected governor of Nevada since Bob Miller won his second full term in 1994, and the first non-incumbent Democrat to win since 1982. This was one of eight Republican-held governorships up for election in a state won by Hillary Clinton in the 2016 presidential election.

== Republican primary ==
=== Candidates ===
==== Nominated ====
- Adam Laxalt, Nevada Attorney General

==== Eliminated in primary ====
- William W. Boyd, small business owner
- Stephanie Carlisle, businesswoman
- Jared Fisher, small business owner
- Dan Schwartz, Nevada State Treasurer and candidate for NV-04 in 2012 (endorsed Laxalt)

==== Declined ====
- Mark Amodei, U.S. representative (ran for re-election and won)
- Joe Heck, former U.S. representative and nominee for U.S. Senate in 2016
- Dean Heller, U.S. senator (endorsed Laxalt and ran for re-election and lost)
- Steve Hill, former executive director of the Nevada Governor's Office of Economic Development
- Mark Hutchison, lieutenant governor (endorsed Laxalt)
- Ron Knecht, Nevada State Controller (ran for re-election and lost)
- Brian Krolicki, former lieutenant governor

=== Endorsements ===
Adam Laxalt

U.S. executive branch officials

- Mike Pence, 48th vice president of the United States
- Donald Trump, 45th president of the United States

U.S. senators

- Dean Heller, U.S. senator

State officials

- Bob Barengo, former speaker of the Nevada Assembly (Democrat)
- Jeb Bush, former governor of Florida
- Mark Hutchison, 34th lieutenant governor of Nevada
- Bob List, former governor of Nevada
- Susana Martinez, governor of New Mexico
- Dan Schwartz, 22nd treasurer of Nevada and 2018 Republican primary candidate for governor

Local officials

- Randy Adams, Mineral County sheriff
- Jerry Allen, Pershing County Sheriff
- Chuck Allen, Washoe County sheriff
- Mike Allen, Humboldt County sheriff
- Gerald Antinoro, Storey County sheriff
- Bob Cashell, former mayor of Reno
- Tom Collins, former Clark County Commissioner (Democrat)
- Roy Edgington, Jr., Fernley mayor
- Kenneth Elgan, Esmeralda County sheriff
- Kenneth Furlong, Carson City sheriff
- Mike Giles, Lovelock mayor
- Oscar Goodman, former mayor of Las Vegas
- Dana Holbrook, Carlin mayor
- Chris Johnson, Elko mayor
- Kerry Lee, Lincoln County sheriff
- Al Litman, Mesquite mayor
- Keith Logan, Eureka County sheriff
- Al McNeil, Lyon County sheriff
- Ron Pierini, Douglas County sheriff
- James Pitts, Elko County sheriff
- Di An Putnam, Winnemucca mayor
- Tommy Rowe, Caliente mayor
- Ken Tedford, Fallon mayor
- Ben Trotter, Churchill County sheriff
- Ron Unger, Lander County sheriff
- Melody VanCamp, Ely mayor
- Dan Watts, White Pine County sheriff
- Sharon Wehrly, Nye County sheriff
- Rod Woodbury, Boulder City mayor

Individuals

- Dema Guinn, former First Lady of Nevada

Organizations

- Las Vegas Metro Chamber of Commerce
- National Federation of Independent Business
- Nevada Veterans Association
- NRA Political Victory Fund

Newspapers

- Las Vegas Review-Journal

=== Polling ===
Poll source	Date(s) administered	Sample size	Margin of error	Adam Laxalt	Dan Schwartz	Jared Fisher	Undecided
The Mellman Group	April 12–19, 2018	400	± 4.9%	55%	4%	2%	38%
WPA Intelligence (R)	August 6–8, 2017	302	± 5.7%	64%	5%	–	31%
Doug Schoen (D)	July 7–20, 2017	600	± 4.0%	34%	30%	–	35%

=== Results ===
Results by county: Map legend: Laxalt—80–90%; Laxalt—70–80%; Laxalt—60–70%

Republican primary results
Party	Candidate	Votes	%
Republican	Adam Laxalt	101,651	71.49%
Republican	Dan Schwartz	12,919	9.09%
Republican	Jared Fisher	6,696	4.71%
Republican	Stephanie Carlisle	6,401	4.50%
	None of These Candidates	6,136	4.32%
Republican	William Boyd	6,028	4.24%
Republican	Stan Lusak	1,011	0.71%
Republican	Frederick Conquest	766	0.54%
Republican	Edward Dundas	576	0.41%
Total votes		142,184	100.00%

== Democratic primary ==
=== Candidates ===
==== Nominated ====
- Steve Sisolak, chair of the Clark County Commission

==== Eliminated in primary ====
- Kyle Chamberlain, activist and photographer
- Chris Giunchigliani, vice-chair of the Clark County Commission and candidate for mayor of Las Vegas in 2011

==== Declined ====
- Aaron Ford, Majority Leader of the Nevada Senate (ran for attorney general and won)
- Vince Juaristi, consultant and former gubernatorial aide
- Tick Segerblom, state senator (ran for Clark County Commission and won)
- Dina Titus, U.S. representative for Nevada's 1st congressional district and nominee for governor in 2006 (endorsed Sisolak and ran for re-election and won)

=== Endorsements ===
Steve Sisolak

Federal politicians

- Eric Holder, 82nd United States Attorney General (2009–2015)
- Jeff Merkley, U.S. senator from Oregon
- Barack Obama, 44th president of the United States (2009–2017), U.S. senator from Illinois (2005–2008)
- Harry Reid, U.S. senator from Nevada (1987–2017) and Senate Majority Leader (2007–2015)
- Dina Titus, U.S. representative from Nevada (3rd district: 2009–2011 and 1st district: 2013–present)

State legislators

- Julia Ratti, Nevada state senator (D-13)

City politicians

- Michael Bloomberg, 108th mayor of New York City (2002–2013) and founder of Bloomberg L.P. and gun control organizations
- Daniel Corona, mayor of West Wendover (2016–present)
- Hillary Schieve, 28th mayor of Reno (2014–present)
Chris Giunchigliani

Federal politicians

- Hillary Clinton, U.S. senator from New York (2001–2009), 67th United States Secretary of State (2009–2013) and 2016 Democratic nominee for president

State legislators

- Teresa Benitez-Thompson, Nevada Assembly majority floor leader (D-27)
- Amber Joiner, Nevada assemblywoman (D-24)
- David Parks, Nevada state senator (D-7)
- Julia Ratti, Nevada state senator (D-13)

Local officials

- David Bobzien, Reno City councilmember (at-large)
- Jenny Brekhus, Reno City Councilmember (Ward 1)

Labor unions

- International Brotherhood of Teamsters Joint Council 42
- Nevada State AFL–CIO
- Nevada State Education Association
- Service Employees International Union Local 1107

Organizations

- Emily's List
- Nevada National Organization for Women
- Sierra Club Toiyabe Chapter
- Working Families Party

=== Polling ===
Poll source	Date(s) administered	Sample size	Margin of error	Chris Giunchigliani	Steve Sisolak	None of these	Other	Undecided
Benenson Strategy Group (D-Women Vote!)	May 21–23, 2018	608	± 4.0%	35%	38%	11%	2%	13%
The Mellman Group	April 12–19, 2018	400	± 4.9%	16%	44%	–	–	40%
Expedition Strategies (D-Giunchigliani)	March 17–19, 2018	600	± 4.0%	31%	27%	18%	–	23%

=== Results ===
Democratic primary results by county: Map legend: Sisolak—50–60%; Sisolak—40–50%; Sisolak—30–40%; Giunchigliani—30–40%; Giunchigliani—40–50%; Giunchigliani—50–60%; None of These Candidates—<30%

Democratic primary results
Party	Candidate	Votes	%
Democratic	Steve Sisolak	72,749	50.03%
Democratic	Chris Giunchigliani	56,511	38.86%
	None of These Candidates	5,069	3.49%
Democratic	John Bonaventura	4,351	2.99%
Democratic	Henry Thorns	2,761	1.90%
Democratic	David Jones	2,511	1.73%
Democratic	Asheesh Dewan	1,468	1.01%
Total votes		145,420	100.00%

== Independents ==
=== Declared ===
- Ryan Bundy, rancher

=== Endorsements ===
Ryan Bundy

Individuals

- Donna Cox, Nye County commissioner
- Ron Paul, former U.S. representative

== General election ==
=== Predictions ===
Source	Ranking	As of
The Cook Political Report	Tossup	October 26, 2018
The Washington Post	Tossup	November 5, 2018
FiveThirtyEight	Lean D (flip)	November 5, 2018
Rothenberg Political Report	Tilt D (flip)	November 1, 2018
Sabato's Crystal Ball	Lean D (flip)	November 5, 2018
RealClearPolitics	Tossup	November 4, 2018
Daily Kos	Tossup	November 5, 2018
Fox News (Note: The Fox News Midterm Power Rankings uniquely does not contain a category for Safe/Solid races)	Tossup	November 5, 2018
Politico	Tossup	November 5, 2018
Governing	Tossup	November 5, 2018

=== Endorsements ===
Adam Laxalt (R)

U.S. executive branch officials

- Mike Pence, 48th vice president of the United States (2017–2021)
- Donald Trump, 45th president of the United States (2017–2021)

U.S. senators

- Dean Heller, U.S. senator from Nevada (2011–2019) and former U.S. representative from Nevada's 2nd congressional district (2007–2011)

State officials

- Bob Barengo, former speaker of the Nevada Assembly (Democrat)
- Jeb Bush, former governor of Florida (1999–2007)
- Mark Hutchison, lieutenant governor of Nevada (2015–2019)
- Bob List, former governor of Nevada (1979–1983)
- Susana Martinez, governor of New Mexico (2011–2019)
- Dan Schwartz, 22nd treasurer of Nevada and 2018 Republican primary candidate for governor

Local officials

- Randy Adams, Mineral County sheriff
- Chuck Allen, Washoe County sheriff
- Jerry Allen, Pershing County sheriff
- Mike Allen, Humboldt County sheriff
- Gerald Antinoro, Storey County sheriff
- Bob Cashell, former mayor of Reno
- Tom Collins, former Clark County Commissioner (Democrat)
- Roy Edgington, Jr., Fernley mayor
- Kenneth Elgan, Esmeralda County sheriff
- Kenneth Furlong, Carson City sheriff
- Mike Giles, Lovelock mayor
- Oscar Goodman, former mayor of Las Vegas
- Dana Holbrook, Carlin mayor
- Chris Johnson, Elko mayor
- Kerry Lee, Lincoln County sheriff
- Al Litman, Mesquite mayor
- Keith Logan, Eureka County sheriff
- Al McNeil, Lyon County sheriff
- Ron Pierini, Douglas County sheriff
- James Pitts, Elko County sheriff
- Di An Putnam, Winnemucca mayor
- Tommy Rowe, Caliente mayor
- Ken Tedford, Fallon mayor
- Ben Trotter, Churchill County sheriff
- Ron Unger, Lander County sheriff
- Melody VanCamp, Ely mayor
- Dan Watts, White Pine County sheriff
- Sharon Wehrly, Nye County sheriff
- Rod Woodbury, Boulder City mayor

Individuals

- Dema Guinn, former First Lady of Nevada

Organizations

- Las Vegas Metro Chamber of Commerce
- National Federation of Independent Business
- Nevada Veterans Association
- NRA Political Victory Fund

Newspapers

- Las Vegas Review-Journal
Steve Sisolak (D)

U.S. executive branch officials

- Joe Biden, 47th vice president of the United States (2009–2017), U.S. senator from Delaware (1973–2009)
- Hillary Clinton, U.S. senator from New York (2001–2009), 67th United States Secretary of State (2009–2013) and 2016 Democratic nominee for president
- Eric Holder, 82nd United States attorney general (2009–2015)
- Barack Obama, 44th president of the United States (2009–2017), U.S. senator from Illinois (2005–2008)

U.S. senators

- Catherine Cortez Masto, U.S. senator from Nevada (2017–present) and former Nevada Attorney General (2007–2015)
- Jeff Merkley, U.S. senator from Oregon (2009–present)
- Harry Reid, U.S. senator from Nevada (1987–2017) and Senate Majority Leader (2007–2015)

U.S. representatives

- Dina Titus, U.S. representative from Nevada's 1st congressional district (2013–present) and 3rd district (2009–2011)

State legislators

- Julia Ratti, Nevada state senator (D-13)

City politicians

- Michael Bloomberg, 108th mayor of New York City (2002–2013) and founder of Bloomberg L.P. and gun control organizations
- Daniel Corona, mayor of West Wendover (2016–present)
- Hillary Schieve, 28th mayor of Reno (2014–present)
Declined to endorse
- Brian Sandoval, 29th governor of Nevada (2011–2019)

=== Polling ===
View source data.

Poll source	Date(s) administered	Sample size	Margin of error	Adam Laxalt (R)	Steve Sisolak (D)	Jared Lord (L)	Ryan Bundy (I)	None of these	Other	Undecided
HarrisX	November 3–5, 2018	600	± 4.0%	44%	45%	–	–	–	–	–
HarrisX	November 2–4, 2018	600	± 4.0%	45%	44%	–	–	–	–	–
Emerson College	November 1–4, 2018	1,197	± 3.0%	47%	48%	–	–	–	4%	2%
HarrisX	November 1–3, 2018	600	± 4.0%	45%	44%	–	–	–	–	–
HarrisX	October 31 – November 2, 2018	600	± 4.0%	47%	43%	–	–	–	–	–
HarrisX	October 30 – November 1, 2018	600	± 4.0%	46%	43%	–	–	–	–	–
The Trafalgar Group (R)	October 29 – November 1, 2018	2,587	± 1.9%	47%	45%	–	–	–	4%	4%
HarrisX	October 29–31, 2018	600	± 4.0%	45%	45%	–	–	–	–	–
HarrisX	October 24–30, 2018	1,400	± 2.6%	43%	45%	–	–	–	–	–
CNN/SSRS	October 24–29, 2018	622 LV	± 4.8%	45%	46%	2%	–	5%	0%	2%
CNN/SSRS	October 24–29, 2018	807 RV	± 4.2%	40%	44%	3%	–	9%	0%	3%
Gravis Marketing	October 24–26, 2018	773	± 3.5%	44%	46%	–	–	–	–	10%
Ipsos	October 12–19, 2018	1,137	± 3.0%	46%	41%	–	–	–	4%	9%
Vox Populi Polling	October 13–15, 2018	614	± 3.7%	48%	52%	–	–	–	–	–
Emerson College	October 10–12, 2018	625	± 4.2%	46%	41%	–	–	–	3%	11%
NYT Upshot/Siena College	October 8–10, 2018	642	± 4.0%	46%	45%	–	–	–	–	8%
Marist College	September 30 – October 3, 2018	574 LV	± 5.5%	44%	40%	8%	–	2%	<1%	6%
Marist College	September 30 – October 3, 2018	574 LV	± 5.5%	46%	45%	–	–	3%	<1%	6%
Marist College	September 30 – October 3, 2018	780 RV	± 4.5%	41%	40%	8%	–	2%	<1%	8%
Marist College	September 30 – October 3, 2018	780 RV	± 4.5%	44%	45%	–	–	4%	<1%	7%
Kaiser Family Foundation/SSRS	September 19 – October 2, 2018	513	± 5.0%	46%	40%	–	–	–	2%	12%
CNN/SSRS	September 25–29, 2018	693 LV	± 4.6%	41%	45%	5%	–	7%	0%	1%
CNN/SSRS	September 25–29, 2018	851 RV	± 4.1%	38%	41%	5%	–	12%	1%	2%
Ipsos	September 7–17, 2018	1,039	± 4.0%	43%	40%	–	–	–	5%	12%
Gravis Marketing	September 11–12, 2018	700	± 3.7%	38%	50%	–	–	–	–	8%
Suffolk University	September 5–10, 2018	500	± 4.4%	35%	37%	5%	4%	2%	1% (Note: Russell Best (IA) with 1%)	15%
Suffolk University	July 24–29, 2018	500	± 4.4%	42%	41%	2%	1%	4%	2% (Note: Russell Best (AI) with 2%)	7%
McLaughlin & Associates (R-Laxalt)	July 21–24, 2018	600	± 4.0%	45%	40%	3%	–	–	4% (Note: Russell Best (AI) with 4%)	8%
Gravis Marketing	June 23–26, 2018	630	± 3.9%	43%	41%	–	–	–	–	17%
The Mellman Group	April 12–19, 2018	600	± 4.0%	37%	43%	–	–	–	–	20%
TargetSmart (D-Giunchigliani)	January 3–7, 2018	1,103	± 4.4%	37%	34%	–	–	–	–	29%
Remington (R-Laxalt)	May 23–24, 2017	1,021	± 3.1%	46%	37%	–	–	–	–	17%

Hypothetical polling

with Chris Giunchigliani

Poll source	Date(s) administered	Sample size	Margin of error	Adam Laxalt (R)	Chris Giunchigliani (D)	Undecided
The Mellman Group	April 12–19, 2018	600	± 4.0%	40%	38%	22%
TargetSmart (D-Giunchigliani)	January 3–7, 2018	1,103	± 4.4%	39%	34%	27%

=== Results ===
While Sisolak only won two of the state's counties, those two counties account for more than 80% of the total state population. His overwhelming victory in Clark County, home of Las Vegas, and his narrow victory in Washoe County were enough to pull him over the finish line. Sisolak became the first Democrat to be elected Governor of Nevada since Bob Miller's successful re-election bid in 1994.

2018 Nevada gubernatorial election
Party	Candidate	Votes	%	±%
Democratic	Steve Sisolak	480,007	49.39%	+25.51%
Republican	Adam Laxalt	440,320	45.31%	−25.27%
	None of These Candidates	18,865	1.94%	−0.94%
Independent	Ryan Bundy	13,891	1.43%	+1.43%
Independent American	Russell Best	10,076	1.04%	−1.62%
Libertarian	Jared Lord	8,640	0.89%	+0.89%
Majority		39,687	4.08%	
Total votes		971,799	100.00%	
Democratic gain from Republican		Swing	+50.78%	

==== By county ====
While Laxalt won 15 of Nevada's county-level jurisdictions (14 counties and the independent city of Carson City), Sisolak carried the two largest, Clark (home to Las Vegas) and Washoe (home to Reno). Sisolak ultimately prevailed by winning his home county, Clark, by over 86,000 votes, double his statewide margin of 39,700 votes.

County	Steve Sisolak Democratic		Adam Laxalt Republican		None of These Candidates		Ryan Bundy Independent		Russell Best Independent American		Jared Lord Libertarian		Margin		Total votes cast
County	#	%	#	%	#	%	#	%	#	%	#	%	#	%	Total votes cast
Carson City	9,249	40.78%	12,080	53.26%	469	2.07%	367	1.62%	324	1.43%	1.92	0.85%	-2,831	-12.48%	22,681
Churchill	1,869	19.45%	7,033	73.21%	194	2.02%	278	2.89%	129	1.34%	104	1.08%	-5,164	-53.75%	9,607
Clark	352,814	54.12%	266,216	40.84%	12,712	1.95%	8,092	1.24%	6,462	0.99%	5,605	0.86%	86,598	13.28%	651,901
Douglas	7,962	30.57%	16,897	64.88%	408	1.57%	345	1.32%	211	0.81%	222	0.85%	-8,935	-34.31%	26,045
Elko	2,604	17.17%	11,444	75.44%	213	1.40%	610	4.02%	140	0.92%	159	1.05%	-8,840	-58.27%	15,170
Esmeralda	51	13.75%	273	73.58%	8	2.16%	29	7.82%	7	1.89%	3	0.81%	-222	-59.84%	371
Eureka	61	8.06%	609	80.45%	20	2.64%	47	6.21%	16	2.11%	4	0.53%	-548	-72.39%	757
Humboldt	1,067	19.25%	4,061	73.26%	118	2.13%	183	3.30%	74	1.34%	40	0.72%	-2,994	-54.01%	5,543
Lander	316	15.11%	1,571	75.13%	57	2.73%	100	4.78%	26	1.24%	21	1.00%	-1,255	-60.02%	2,091
Lincoln	266	13.63%	1,440	73.77%	37	1.90%	179	9.17%	16	0.82%	14	0.72%	-1,174	-60.14%	1,952
Lyon	5,267	25.19%	14,211	67.95%	401	1.92%	551	2.63%	276	1.32%	207	0.99%	-8,944	-42.77%	20,913
Mineral	540	29.85%	1,067	58.98%	78	4.31%	64	3.54%	34	1.88%	26	1.44%	-527	-29.13%	1,809
Nye	4,607	26.33%	11,103	63.47%	329	1.88%	991	5.66%	299	1.71%	165	0.94%	-6,496	-37.13%	17,494
Pershing	360	20.41%	1,255	71.15%	38	2.15%	80	4.54%	19	1.08%	12	0.68%	-895	-50.74%	1,764
Storey	721	30.56%	1,476	62.57%	40	1.70%	61	2.59%	34	1.44%	27	1.14%	-755	-32.01%	2,359
Washoe	91,684	48.74%	87,226	46.37%	3,669	1.95%	1,742	0.93%	1,961	1.04%	1,816	0.97%	4,458	2.37%	188,098
White Pine	569	17.54%	2,358	72.69%	74	2.28%	172	5.30%	48	1.48%	23	0.71%	-1,789	-55.15%	3,244
Totals	480,007	49.39%	440,320	45.31%	18,865	1.94%	13,891	1.43%	10,076	1.04%	8,640	0.89%	39,687	4.08%	971,799

Counties that flipped from Republican to Democratic

- Clark (largest municipality: Las Vegas)
- Washoe (largest municipality: Reno)

==== By congressional district ====
Sisolak won three of four congressional districts.

District	Sisolak	Laxalt	Representative
1st	62%	32%	Dina Titus
2nd	41%	53%	Mark Amodei
3rd	50%	46%	Susie Lee
4th	50%	44%	Steven Horsford

== See also ==
- 2018 Nevada elections
