= Glomb (surname) =

Glomb is a surname. It is derived from the Polish noun "głąb". Notable people with the surname include:

- Daniel Glomb (born 1980), Brazilian sailor
- Diana Glomb (born 1947), American politician and social worker
- Günther Glomb (1930–2015), German football manager
- Theresa Glomb, American academic
