= Skip Daly =

American politician

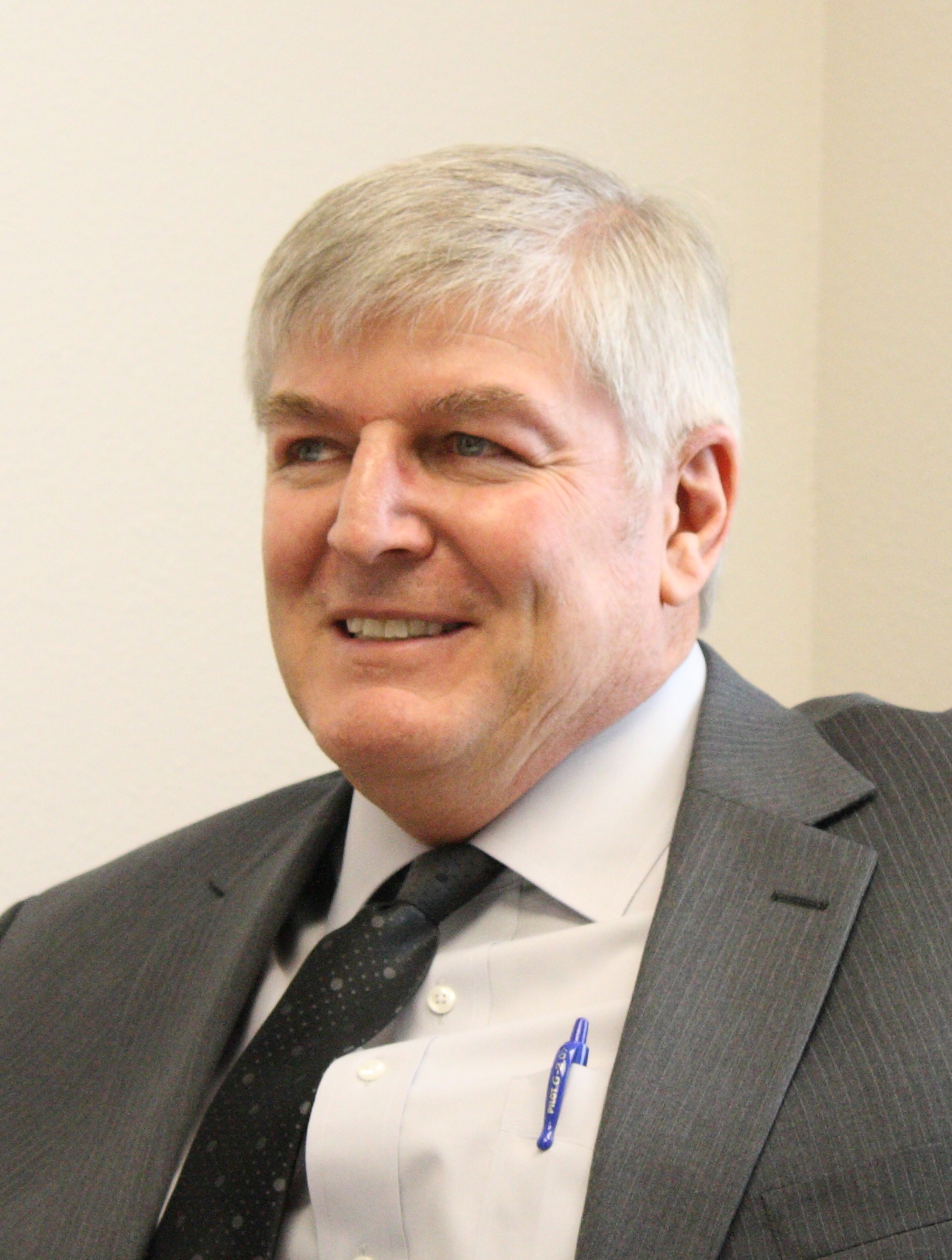
- Daly in 2011

Member of the Nevada Senate from the 13th district
- Incumbent
- Assumed office November 9, 2022
- Preceded by: Julia Ratti

Member of the Nevada Assembly from the 31st district
- In office November 9, 2016 – November 4, 2020
- Preceded by: Jill Dickman
- Succeeded by: Jill Dickman
- In office November 3, 2010 – November 5, 2014
- Preceded by: Bernie Anderson
- Succeeded by: Jill Dickman

Personal details
- Born: 1959 (age 66–67) Reno, Nevada, U.S.
- Party: Democratic
- Education: Truckee Meadows Community College (AA)

Richard 'Skip' Daly (born in 1959 in Reno, Nevada) is an American politician and Democratic member of the Nevada Senate representing the 13th district. He previously served in the Nevada Assembly from 2010 until 2014 and again from 2016 to 2020.

== Education ==
Daly earned his AA from Truckee Meadows Community College.

== Elections ==
- 2016 Daly regains his seat.
- 2014 Daly loses to opponent Jill Dickman, securing only 7,943 votes (44%) during the November 4, 2014 General Election.
- 2012 Daly was unopposed for the June 12, 2012 Democratic Primary and won the November 6, 2012 General election with 14,540 votes (52.00%) against Republican nominee David Espinosa.
- 2010 When Democratic Assemblyman Bernie Anderson retired from the Assembly because he was term limited and left the District 31 seat open, Daly won the three-way June 8, 2010 Democratic Primary with 1,760 votes (75.60%), and won the November 2, 2010 General election with 6,258 votes (56.98%) against Republican nominee Randi Thompson, who had run for the seat in 1998, 2004, and 2006.
