= Thomas Batten =

American politician

Member of the Nevada Assembly from the 27th district
- In office November 9, 1994 – November 6, 1996
- Preceded by: Ken Haller
- Succeeded by: Pat Hickey

Personal details
- Born: September 20, 1955 (age 70) Munich, Bavaria, West Germany
- Party: Republican
- Education: Tidewater Community College
- Occupation: Police officer

Thomas Batten (born in 1955) is an American politician. He served as a Republican member of the Nevada Assembly from 1994 to 1996 representing District 27 (covering part of Washoe County including part of Reno).

== Background ==
Before being elected to the legislature, Batten was a police officer who received a degree in police science from Tidewater Community College in Virginia Beach, Virginia. Along with Bernice Mathews and Maurice Washington who took office at the same time, Batten was the first Black member of the Nevada Legislature from outside Clark County.

== Elections ==
Election	Political result	Candidate	Party	Votes	%
1994 general election Batten was unopposed in the primary	Republican pick-up	Thomas Batten	Republican	2,820	47.51%
1994 general election Batten was unopposed in the primary	Republican pick-up	Ken Haller (i)	Democratic	2,704	45.56%
1994 general election Batten was unopposed in the primary	Republican pick-up	Linwood R. Tracy, Jr.	Independent American	411	6.92%
