= Nevada's 13th Senate district =

American legislative district

Nevada's 13th State Senate district
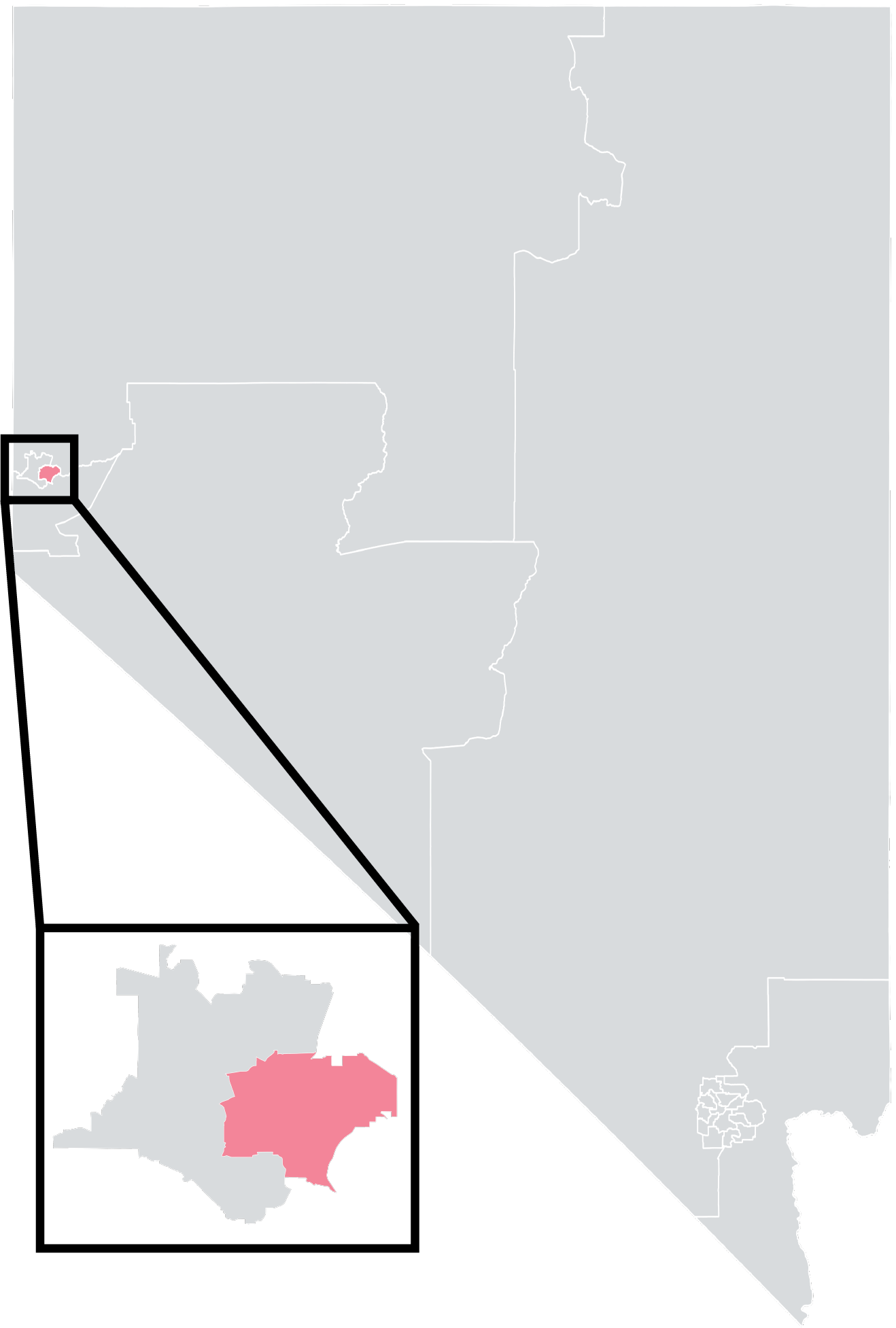
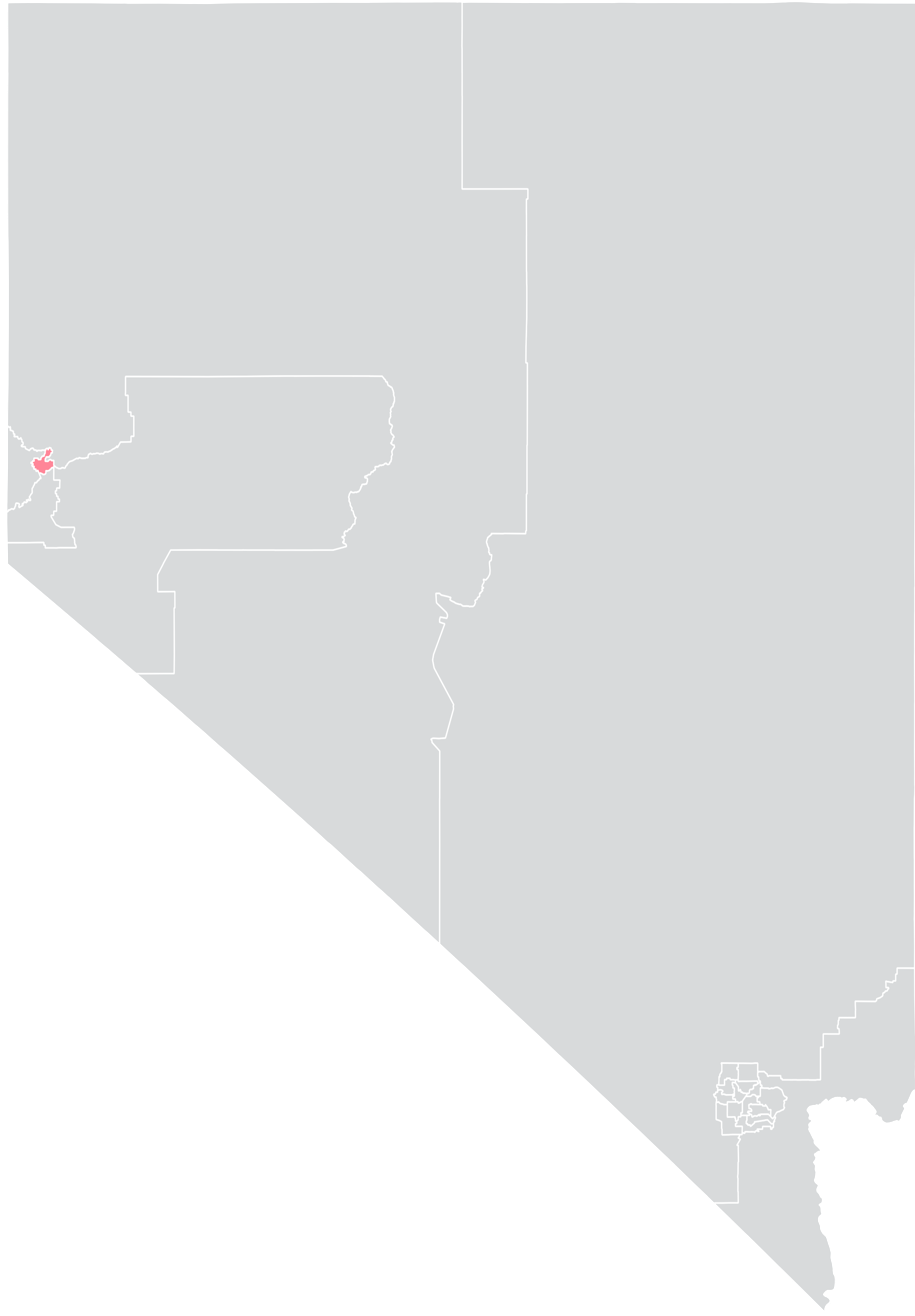
Senator
Skip Daly; D–Sparks
- Registration: 46.3% Democratic; 29.0% Republican; 17.3% No party preference
- Demographics: 50% White; 3% Black; 35% Hispanic; 6% Asian; 2% Native American; 1% Hawaiian/Pacific Islander; 3% Other
- Population (2018): 136,122
- Registered voters: 62,050

Nevada's 13th Senate district is one of 21 districts in the Nevada Senate. It has been represented by Democrat Skip Daly since 2022, succeeding fellow Democrat Julia Ratti.

== Geography ==
District 13 covers much of central Reno and Sparks in Washoe County.

The district is located entirely within Nevada's 2nd congressional district, and overlaps with the 24th and 30th districts of the Nevada Assembly.

== Recent election results ==
Nevada Senators are elected to staggered four-year terms; since 2012 redistricting, the 13th district has held regularly scheduled elections in midterm years, and off-cycle elections in 2012 (due to Sheila Leslie's resignation) and 2016 (due to Debbie Smith's death).

=== 2022 ===
2022 Nevada State Senate election, District 13
Party	Candidate	Votes	%
Democratic	Skip Daly	23,416	61.6
Republican	Matthew Buehler	14,618	38.4
Total votes		38,034	100
Democratic hold			

== Historical election results ==
=== 2018 ===
2018 Nevada State Senate election, District 13
Party	Candidate	Votes	%
Democratic	Julia Ratti (incumbent)	27,079	70.3
Independent American	Charlene Young	11,415	29.7
Total votes		38,494	100
Democratic hold			

=== 2016 ===
2016 Nevada State Senate election, District 13
Primary election
Party	Candidate	Votes	%
Republican	Kent Bailey	2,499	69.9
Republican	Samantha Brockelsby	1,074	30.1
Total votes		3,573	100
General election
Democratic	Julia Ratti (incumbent)	27,280	60.0
Republican	Kent Bailey	15,811	34.8
Libertarian	Brandon Jacobs	2,406	5.3
Total votes		45,497	100
Democratic hold			

=== 2014 ===
2014 Nevada State Senate election, District 13
Party	Candidate	Votes	%
Democratic	Debbie Smith (incumbent)	12,943	60.6
Republican	Thomas Koziol	8,432	39.4
Total votes		21,375	100
Democratic hold			

=== 2012 ===
2012 Nevada State Senate election, District 13
Party	Candidate	Votes	%
Democratic	Debbie Smith	25,975	64.7
Republican	Kathy Martin	14,151	35.3
Total votes		40,126	100
Democratic hold			

=== Federal and statewide results ===
Year	Office	Results
2020	President	Biden 61.1 – 36.0%
2018	Senate	Rosen 61.7 – 33.6%
2018	Governor	Sisolak 59.8 – 34.2%
2016	President	Clinton 57.3 – 34.1%
2012	President	Obama 63.8 – 33.7%
2012	Senate	Berkley 49.8 – 37.5%
