= Lauren Scott =

American LGBTQ activist

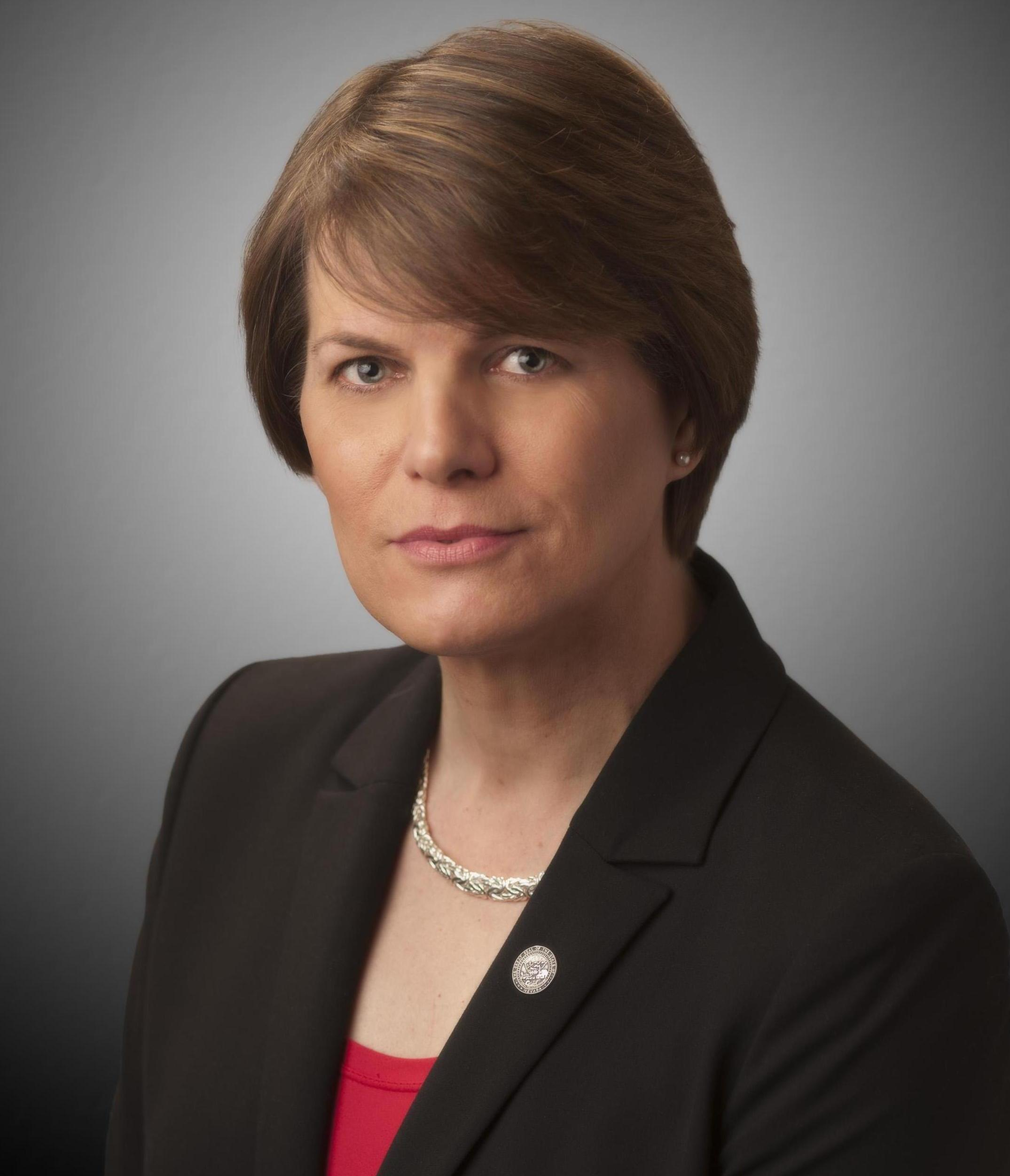
- Portait, 2014

Member of the Nevada Equal Rights Commission
- In office 2012–2016
- Appointed by: Brian Sandoval

Personal details
- Party: Republican
- Education: Saint Leo University (BBA)
- Occupation: LGBT advocate, politician, entrepreneur
- Website: http://www.scottfornevada.com

Military service
- Allegiance: United States of America
- Branch/service: United States Air Force
- Years of service: 1986–1994
- Rank: Staff Sergeant
- Unit: 56th Fighter Wing, 4450th Tactical Group

Lauren Alex Scott is an American politician, civil rights activist and entrepreneur. In the June 2014 primary election, she won the Republican nomination for the Nevada Assembly's 30th District, earning 58% of the vote. Scott received 46% of the vote in the November 2014 general election and lost the election to incumbent Democrat Michael Sprinkle.

Nevada Governor Brian Sandoval appointed Scott to the Nevada Equal Rights Commission (NERC) in 2012.

== Politics ==
=== 2012 campaign ===
In the 2012 Republican primary election for Nevada Assembly District 30, Scott received 21 percent of the vote in her bid for the seat vacated by Democrat Debbie Smith. By garnering 65 percent of the vote, Ken Lightfoot won the Republican nomination during that election, defeating Scott and Paul Maineri.

Nevada State Assembly, District 30, Republican Primary Election, 2012
Party	Candidate	Votes	%
Republican	Ken Lightfoot	1,299	65.1
Republican	Lauren Scott	427	21.4
Republican	Paul Maineri	270	13.5

In the general election, Ken Lightfoot lost the election with 43 percent to Michael Sprinkle's 57 percent.

=== 2014 campaign ===
Scott lost the 2014 general election campaign to incumbent Democrat Michael Sprinkle.

Nevada State Assembly, District 30, General Election, 2014
Party	Candidate	Votes	%
Democratic	Michael Sprinkle	6,187	53.89
Republican	Lauren Scott	5,293	46.11

Scott won the Nevada Assembly District 30 primary election by receiving 58 percent of the vote, allowing her to advance and represent the Republican Party in November to challenge the current Democratic incumbent, State Assemblyman Michael Sprinkle. Adam Khan unsuccessfully ran against Scott in the primary, winning 42 percent of the vote. Nevada Governor Brian Sandoval endorsed Scott, while Khan had received the endorsement of the Nevada Republican Assembly (NVRA).

Nevada State Assembly, District 30, Republican Primary Election, 2014
Party	Candidate	Votes	%
Republican	Lauren Scott	1,187	58.33
Republican	Adam Khan	848	41.67

=== 2016 campaign ===
Scott announced that she would run again for the Nevada Assembly District 30 seat in 2016.

Nevada State Assembly, District 30, General Election, 2016
Party	Candidate	Votes	%
Democratic	Michael Sprinkle	13,572	57.87
Republican	Lauren Scott	9,881	42.13

== Civil rights activism ==
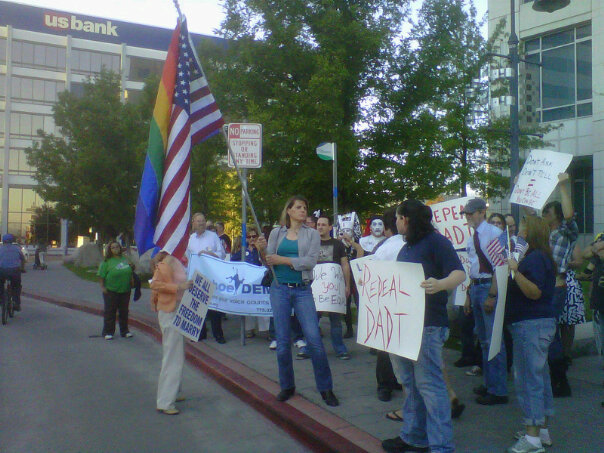
Scott in September 2010

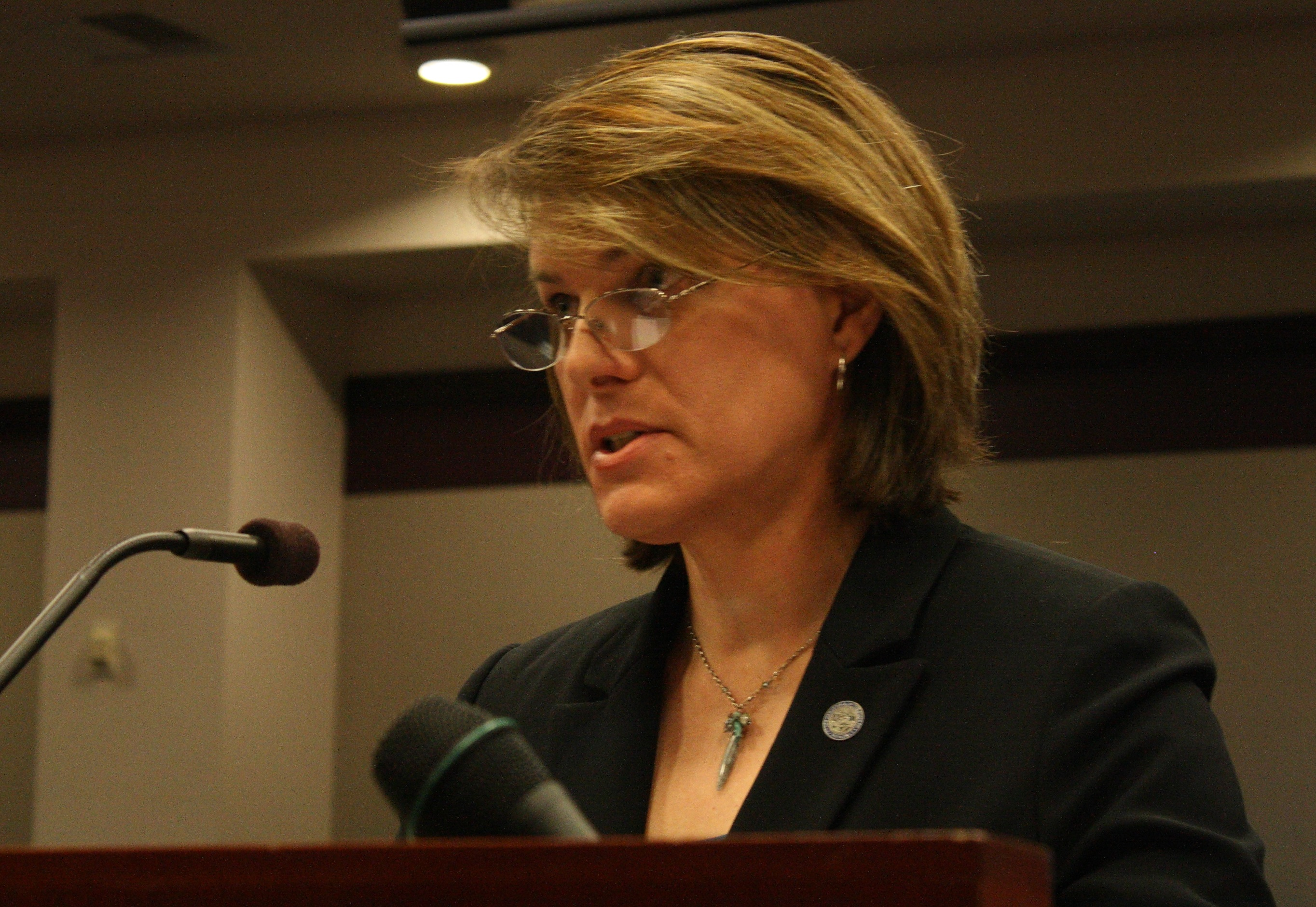
Scott in March 2011

Scott founded Equality Nevada, Inc. in 2009 and served as the executive director from 2009 through 2015. Equality Nevada was organized to fight for LGBTQ equality in Nevada and it was voted one of the top grassroots organizations in Northern Nevada in 2009.

Scott supported the repeal of the military "Don't ask, don't tell" policy in 2010. A ban on military service by openly gay and lesbian service members was ruled as a violation of the US Constitution in Log Cabin Republicans v. United States of America in 2011.

In the 2011 legislative session, Scott continued to work to advance civil rights in Nevada. By working with members of the American Civil Liberties Union (ACLU), Nevada Women's Lobby and the Progressive Leadership Alliance of Nevada (PLAN), she was able to help secure the passage of transgender inclusive civil rights legislation for the first time in Nevada. She has been recognized on the floor of both the Nevada Assembly and the Senate.

During the 2013 Nevada legislative session Scott testified in support of SB139, a bill to add 'gender identity and expression' to the state hate crime statutes. The bill was signed by Governor Brian Sandoval on May 21, 2013.

== Later life ==
After resigning her position as Electrical Design Manager at Plasma-Therm in 1998, Scott began her gender transition in 1999 while living in Clearwater, Florida. She co-founded a start-up company that produced high voltage power supplies, which was later acquired and rebranded as Gripping Power, Inc. in 2002.

Scott was employed as an electrical systems engineer at Biodiesel Solutions in 2007. She was laid off when Biodiesel Solutions ceased operations in 2008. She has worked as a consultant, on business development and renewable energy issues since then.

She founded and became the president and CEO of Alkcon Corporation in 2013.

== Education and military service ==
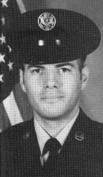
Scott in December 1986

Scott graduated with honors from St. Leo University with a Bachelor of Business Administration, with specializations in technology management and information systems, in 1994.

Scott enlisted in the US Air Force in 1986 and worked as a firefighter until she received an honorable discharge in 1994.

== See also ==
- List of transgender public officeholders in the United States
