= Erica Roth =

American politician

Member of the Nevada Assembly from the 24th district
- Incumbent
- Assumed office November 6, 2024
- Preceded by: Sarah Peters

Personal details
- Party: Democratic
- Education: University of California, Santa Cruz; University of San Francisco School of Law
- Website: www.voteericaroth.com

Erica P. Roth is an American politician. She has been a member of the Nevada Assembly since 2024. A member of the Democratic Party, she was elected in the 2024 Nevada Assembly election. She is a civil rights attorney. She worked for the Washoe County Public Defender’s Office and was deputy general counsel to Governor Steve Sisolak.
