= Michael Sprinkle =

American politician

Member of the Nevada Assembly from the 30th district
- In office February 4, 2013 – March 14, 2019
- Preceded by: Debbie Smith
- Succeeded by: Greg Smith

Personal details
- Born: 1968 (age 57–58) San Francisco, California, U.S.
- Party: Democratic
- Education: Loyola Marymount University
- Website: sprinkleforassembly.com

Michael Sprinkle, (born in 1968 in San Francisco, California), is an American politician and served as a Democratic member of the Nevada Assembly beginning on February 4, 2013 representing District 30. Michael Sprinkle resigned from the Nevada Assembly in April 2019.

== Education ==
Sprinkle earned his BLA from Loyola Marymount University.

== Politics ==
=== 2006 campaign ===
Initially challenging Republican Assemblyman John Marvel for the District 32 seat, Sprinkle was unopposed for the August 15, 2006 Democratic Primary, but lost the November 7, 2006 General election.

=== 2012 campaign ===
When Democratic Assemblyman Debbie Smith ran for Nevada Senate and left the House District 30 seat open, Sprinkle was unopposed for the three-way June 12, 2012 Democratic Primary and won the November 6, 2012 General election with 12,094 votes (57.01%) against Republican nominee Ken Lightfoot.

Nevada State Assembly, District 30, General Election, 2012
Party	Candidate	Votes	%
Democratic	Michael Sprinkle	12,094	57.01
Republican	Ken Lightfoot	9,118	42.99

=== 2014 campaign ===
Nevada State Assembly, District 30, General Election, 2014
Party	Candidate	Votes	%
Democratic	Michael Sprinkle	6,187	53.89
Republican	Lauren Scott	5,293	46.11

=== 2016 campaign ===
Nevada State Assembly, District 30, General Election, 2016
Party	Candidate	Votes	%
Democratic	Michael Sprinkle	13,572	57.87
Republican	Lauren Scott	9,881	42.13

=== 2018 campaign ===
Michael Sprinkle was unopposed in the 2018 general election and remained seated in the Nevada State Assembly. However, due to "growing sexual harassment claims" Michael Sprinkle resigned from the Nevada Assembly in April 2019.

Assistant Majority Leader Julia Ratti said in a statement, "We condemn sexual misconduct in the strongest terms.”
