= Jill Dickman =

American businesswoman and politician

Member of the Nevada Assembly from the 31st district

Personal details
- Born: Hancock, Michigan, U.S.
- Party: Republican
- Spouse: Thomas Dickman
- Education: L'Anse High School
- Occupation: Businesswoman, politician

Jill Dickman is an American businesswoman and politician. She serves as a Republican member of the Nevada Assembly and represented Assembly District 31.

== Early life ==
Jill Dickman was born in Hancock, Michigan. Jill's grandparents emigrated from Russia, shortly after the Bolshevik revolution. The decided to move to America as they saw it as an opportunity to live a better life. They quickly became citizens, learned the language, and fell in love with their new home. Jill was born in upper Michigan to a family of Entrepreneurs. As she grew up she started working in the family business, of a clothing store. She quickly be the manager and later the owner of the company. She was educated at the L'Anse High School in L'Anse, Michigan and attended the Michigan Technological University in Houghton, Michigan.

== Career ==
Dickman is a small business owner. She served as a Republican member of the Nevada Assembly. She is a proponent of campus carry on college and university campuses. In May 2015, she voted in favor of giving taxpayer money to private schools. She also voted for the tax increases proposed by Governor Brian Sandoval (which passed the House and Senate regardless). Jill Dickman was defeated by Skip Daly in the 2016 Election. Dickman ran again in the 2018 election, but was defeated by Daly again. In 2020, Dickman defeated Daly.

== Personal life ==
Dickman has a husband, Thomas. They reside in Sparks, Nevada.
