= Ken Haller =

American politician

Member of the Nevada Assembly from the 27th district
- In office November 5, 1986 – November 9, 1988
- Preceded by: Bruce Bogaert
- Succeeded by: Bruce Bogaert
- In office November 7, 1990 – November 9, 1994
- Preceded by: Bruce Bogaert
- Succeeded by: Thomas Batten

Personal details
- Born: December 25, 1922 Baltimore, Maryland, US
- Died: November 25, 2006 (aged 83) Reno, Nevada
- Party: Democratic
- Education: Columbia University, B.S.
- Occupation: Teacher

Ken Haller was an American politician. He served as a Democratic member of the Nevada Assembly from 1986 to 1988 and again from 1990 to 1994, representing District 27 in Washoe County.

== Background and career ==
Haller was born in Baltimore, Maryland, and served in the United States Air Force during World War II. He graduated from Columbia University in 1957 and moved to Sparks, Nevada in 1959 where he became a teacher. Before serving in the Legislature, Haller was the president of the Washoe County Teachers' Association and was also active in the state and county Democratic parties. Beginning in 1982, Haller and Republican Assemblyman Bruce Bogaert ran for the same Assembly seat five times, with three of those elections resulting in the seat switching hands.

== Elections ==
Election	Political result	Candidate	Party	Votes	%
1994 general election	Republican pick-up	Thomas Batten	Republican	2,820	47.51%
1994 general election	Republican pick-up	Ken Haller (i)	Democratic	2,704	45.56%
1994 general election	Republican pick-up	Linwood R. Tracy, Jr.	Independent American	411	6.92%

Election	Political result	Candidate	Party	Votes	%
1994 Democratic primary	incumbent hold	Ken Haller (i)		865	46.43%
1994 Democratic primary	incumbent hold	Bonnie Schultz		590	31.67%
1994 Democratic primary	incumbent hold	Tina Schafer		408	21.90%

Election	Political result	Candidate	Party	Votes	%
1992 general election	Democratic hold	Ken Haller (i)	Democratic	4,641	52.61%
1992 general election	Democratic hold	Shawn Anderson	Republican	3,202	36.30%
1992 general election	Democratic hold	John K. Becan	Libertarian	976	11.06%

Election	Political result	Candidate	Party	Votes	%
1992 Democratic primary	incumbent hold	Ken Haller (i)		1,096	44.95%
1992 Democratic primary	incumbent hold	Joe L. Johnson		899	36.21%
1992 Democratic primary	incumbent hold	Stanley Waugh		443	17.84%

Election	Political result	Candidate	Party	Votes	%
1990 general election unopposed in primary	Democratic pick-up	Ken Haller	Democratic	2,580	51.15%
1990 general election unopposed in primary	Democratic pick-up	Bruce Bogaert (i)	Republican	2,142	42.47%
1990 general election unopposed in primary	Democratic pick-up	Gary Whitney	Libertarian	322	6.38%

Election	Political result	Candidate	Party	Votes	%
1988 general election Haller was unopposed in primary	Republican pick-up	Bruce Bogaert	Republican	3,255	51.91%
1988 general election Haller was unopposed in primary	Republican pick-up	Ken Haller (i)	Democratic	3,016	49.09%

Election	Political result	Candidate	Party	Votes	%
1986 general election unopposed in primary	Democratic pick-up	Ken Haller	Democratic	2,975	54.52%
1986 general election unopposed in primary	Democratic pick-up	Bruce Bogaert (i)	Republican	2,482	45.48%

Election	Political result	Candidate	Party	Votes	%
1984 general election unopposed in primary	Republican hold	Bruce Bogaert (i)	Republican	3,107	51.57%
1984 general election unopposed in primary	Republican hold	Ken Haller	Democratic	2,918	48.43%

Election	Political result	Candidate	Party	Votes	%
1982 general election	Republican hold	Bruce Bogaert (i)	Republican	2,767	51.93%
1982 general election	Republican hold	Ken Haller	Democratic	2,571	48.07%

Election	Political result	Candidate	Party	Votes	%
1982 Democratic primary	Haller victory	Ken Haller		912	40.21%
1982 Democratic primary	Haller victory	J.M. Basta		838	36.95%
1982 Democratic primary	Haller victory	R.C. Wright		518	22.84%
