= Dominic Brunetti =

American politician

Member of the Nevada Assembly from the 25th district
- In office September 27, 2016 – November 9, 2016
- Preceded by: Patrick Hickey
- Succeeded by: Jill Tolles

Personal details
- Born: 1977 (age 48–49) Phoenix, Arizona, United States
- Party: Republican
- Education: Stanford University

Dominic Brunetti (born 1977) is an American politician. He is a Republican former member of the Nevada Assembly, representing District 25 (part of Washoe County). He was appointed to replace Pat Hickey, who resigned.

== Biography ==
Brunetti works as a real estate agent. He was previously president of the Nevada Homebuilders' Association.

After the 2015 legislative session, prior incumbent Pat Hickey resigned in order to take a position on the Nevada Board of Education. The seat remained vacant until September 2016, when Brunetti was appointed by the Washoe County Commission for the October 2016 special session. The session was called in order to authorize the issuance of $750 million in public bonds, so that the money could be given to the Oakland Raiders for the construction of Allegiant Stadium. Brunetti ultimately voted in favor of the subsidy.

Brunetti did not stand for election in November 2016 and was succeeded by fellow Republican Jill Tolles.

== Personal life ==
Brunetti and his wife, Nina, have three children: Giana, Gemma, and Guy. Brunetti completed a BA (political science) at Stanford University and is an avid dancer and amateur chef in his free time.
