= Sheila Leslie =

American politician

Member of the Nevada Senate from the Washoe County 1st (later 13th) district
- In office November 3, 2010 – February 15, 2012
- Preceded by: Bernice Mathews
- Succeeded by: Debbie Smith

Member of the Nevada Assembly from the 27th district
- In office November 4, 1998 – November 3, 2010
- Preceded by: Pat Hickey
- Succeeded by: Teresa Benitez-Thompson

Personal details
- Born: November 6, 1955 (age 70) Carmel, California, U.S.
- Party: Democratic
- Spouse: Divorced
- Children: Emma Fulkerson
- Education: Sonoma State University, University of Nevada
- Occupation: Business administration

Sheila Leslie (born in 1955 in Carmel-by-the-Sea, California) is an American politician. She served as a Democratic member of the Nevada Assembly from 1998 to 2010 representing District 27, as well as in the Nevada Senate representing District 13 from 2010 to 2012 (both covering part of Washoe County including much of Reno and Sparks). Leslie served as Assistant Whip in the Assembly from 2001 to 2007, as Majority Whip in the Assembly from 2007 to 2011, and as Assistant Whip in the Senate from 2011 to 2012.

== Background ==
Leslie received her bachelor's degree from Sonoma State University in 1977 and her master's degree in 1979 from University of Nevada, Reno in Spanish Language and Literature. Leslie also served as a Peace Corps volunteer. Her professional career has mainly been spent as an administrator in the non-profit and government sector. Currently, Leslie is the administrator for the specialty court system in the Second Judicial District Court of Nevada. After leaving office, Leslie was a regular contributor to the Reno News & Review and is currently a regular contributor to the Reno Gazette-Journal. Leslie was considered one of the most progressive Democrats in the Legislature, with a number of awards from progressive-leaning groups and low policy scorecard ratings from conservative-leaning groups.

== Elections ==
- 2012 After the 2011 legislative session ended, Leslie resigned from Senate District 13 and moved to Senate District 15 (also in Washoe County) in order to challenge Republican incumbent Greg Brower. Leslie was unopposed in the primary election, but lost the general election with 29,086 votes (49.77%), compared to Brower's 29,352 votes (50.23%).
- 2010 After incumbent Democratic senator Bernice Mathews was barred from running due to term limits, Leslie ran unopposed in the primary election to succeed her in Washoe District 1 (later renamed Senate District 13). Leslie then won the general election with 11,070 votes (62.05%) against Republican nominee Phillip Salerno.
- 2008 Leslie won the primary with 1,490 votes (90.58%) against Glenn Fruehan. She then won the general election with 10,154 votes (67.28%) against Republican nominee Virgil Neal.
- 2006 Leslie was unopposed in the primary and won the general with 6,893 votes (75.82%) against Republican nominee Glenn Fruehan.
- 2004 Leslie was unopposed in the primary. She defeated Republican nominee Larry Martin with 9,076 votes (62.75%) in the general election.
- 2002 Leslie was unopposed in the primary. She defeated Republican nominee Larry Martin with 5,058 votes (53.04%) in the general election.
- 2000 Leslie was unopposed in both the primary and the general elections.
- 1998 After Republican Assemblyman Pat Hickey left the Assembly and left the District 27 seat open, Leslie was unopposed in the Democratic primary and won the general election with 3,328 votes (57.03%) against Republican nominee Cliff Young (son of Clarence Clifton Young).
