= Truckee Meadows Community College =

Public college in Reno, Nevada, US

Coordinates: 39.5719°N 119.797°W

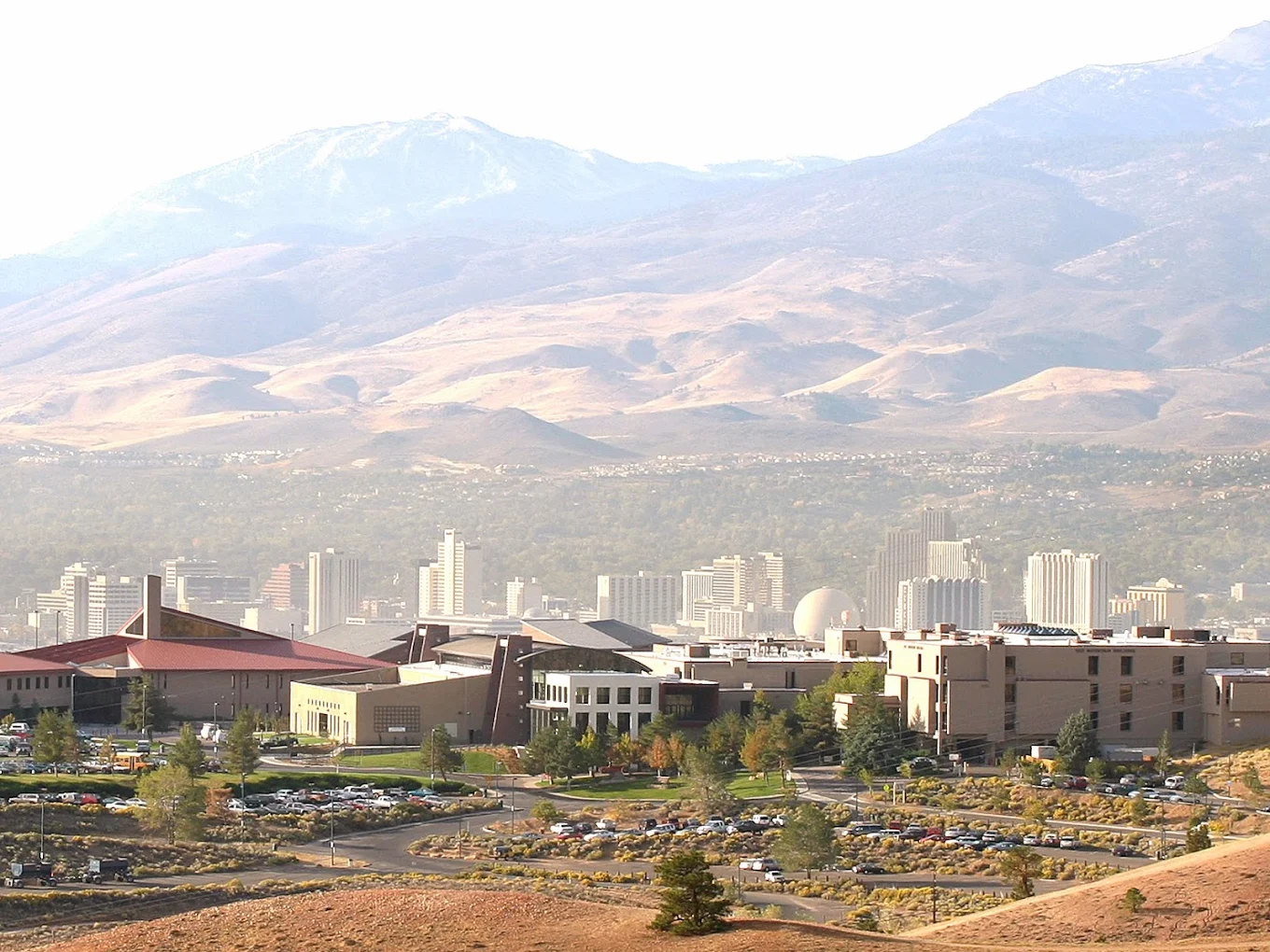
- Type: Public community college
- Established: 1971; 55 years ago
- Parent institution: Nevada System of Higher Education
- Academic affiliations: Space-grant
- President: Jeffrey Alexander
- Students: 11,849
- Location: Reno, Nevada, United States
- Colors: Black & Green
- Nickname: Lizards
- Mascots: Mighty the Lizard and Wizard the Lizard
- Website: www.tmcc.edu

Truckee Meadows Community College (TMCC) is a public technical and community college in Reno, Nevada, United States. The college is primarily a commuter campus with four locations. TMCC offers students both certificate and associate degrees. In 2015, TMCC was approved to offer two Bachelor of Applied Science degrees, one in Logistics Operations Management and the other in Emergency Management and Homeland Security. TMCC also offers bachelor’s degrees in Architecture, Career and Technical Leadership Education, Dental Hygiene, Graphic Arts and Media Technology, Nursing and Radiologic Technology.

From 1971 to 1979, the college was a branch of Western Nevada Community College. Its current name is based on its primary service area, Truckee Meadows in Reno and Sparks. The college has more than 500 faculty members and is accredited by the Northwest Commission on College and Universities. The college serves more than 16,000 students each semester in state-supported programs and another 7,800 students in non-credit workforce development classes. TMCC is regionally accredited by the Northwest Commission on Colleges and Universities.

Truckee Meadows Community College is a member of the NJCAA Division 1 and competes in conference play within Region XVIII.

== Academics ==
The college offers a university-transfer program and a wide variety of occupational and applied technical programs, including a large number of developmental courses, particularly in mathematics and English to prepare students to take university transfer courses. Starting in the 1980s, the student demand for courses and programs created a need for more facilities. In addition to expanding the Dandini Campus, the college established the William N. Pennington Applied Technology Center (March 1999), Meadowood Center (February 2003), and the William N. Pennington Health Science Center, located at the Redfield Campus (September 2005).

The college offers degrees and certificates in over 70 programs of study leading to more than 160 degrees and certificates. Popular programs include: Health Professions and Related Programs, Liberal Arts and Sciences, General Studies and Humanities, and Science Technologies/Technicians.

== Notable alumni ==
- Amadour, artist, musician, writer
- Skip Daly, politician
- John Oceguera, politician
- Paige VanZant, professional wrestler
