= Greg Smith (Nevada politician) =

American politician

Member of the Nevada Assembly from the 30th district
- In office March 27, 2019 – November 4, 2020
- Preceded by: Michael Sprinkle
- Succeeded by: Natha Anderson

Personal details
- Born: 1955 (age 70–71) Monte Vista, Colorado, U.S.
- Party: Democratic
- Spouse: Debbie Smith (died 2016)
- Education: University of Nevada, Reno

Greg Smith (born 1955) is an American politician who served as a member of the Nevada Assembly for the 30th district from March 2019 to November 2020.

== Early life and education ==
Smith was born in 1955 in Monte Vista, Colorado. After attending Battle Mountain High School, Smith graduated from the University of Nevada, Reno.

== Career ==
In 2018, Smith unsuccessfully ran in the Democratic primary for the Washoe County Commission seat representing the 5th district. On March 14, 2019, Michael Sprinkle resigned his seat in the Nevada Assembly amid allegations of sexual harassment. On March 26, 2019, Smith, a fellow Democrat, was appointed by the Washoe County Commission to fill the vacancy left by Sprinkle's resignation. Smith was sworn in to the position on March 27, 2019 and served in it until November 4, 2020. He did not seek re-election.

== Personal life ==
Greg Smith was married to Nevada state senator Debbie Smith. Debbie died of brain cancer on February 21, 2016. Greg has three children.
