= Patrick Hickey (politician) =

American politician

Pat Hickey

Member of the Nevada Assembly from the 25th district
- In office November 3, 2010 – January 12, 2016
- Preceded by: Heidi Gansert
- Succeeded by: Dominic Brunetti

Member of the Nevada Assembly from the 27th district
- In office November 6, 1996 – November 4, 1998
- Preceded by: Thomas Batten
- Succeeded by: Sheila Leslie

Personal details
- Born: August 17, 1950 (age 76) Carson City, Nevada, U.S.
- Party: Republican
- Spouse: Shin Myung-hee
- Education: Regents College (BS) University of Nevada, Reno (MA)

Patrick T. "Pat" Hickey (born August 17, 1950) is an American politician. He formerly served as a Republican member of the Nevada Assembly representing Assembly Districts 25 and 27 in Washoe County. He served as Minority Floor Leader from 2013 to 2014.

== Background and personal life ==
Hickey was born in Carson City, Nevada. As a young man he refused induction into the United States military during the Vietnam War, dropped out of college, and travelled through Canada as a "hippie." Soon after this he joined the Unification Church of the United States which at that time had only recently been founded. Hickey worked in the Unification Church as a state leader and regional spokesperson.

In 1978 Hickey was matched with his wife, Shin Myung-hee of South Korea, by church founder Sun Myung Moon. They were married in 1982 in a Blessing ceremony of the Unification Church, held in Madison Square Garden in New York City, along with over 2000 other couples. They now have four grown children.

Hickey is now a member of the Roman Catholic Church, in which he was originally raised. Hickey has a BS from Regents College of the University of the State of New York (now Excelsior University), and an MA in journalism from University of Nevada, Reno.

Hickey moved back to Nevada in the 1990s and worked as a reporter as well as founding a house painting company. Hickey served on the State Board of Education from 2016 to 2017. After this term ended, Hickey became the executive director of the Charter School Association of Nevada, lobbying on behalf of charter schools.

== Political career ==
In 1996, Hickey was elected to the Nevada Assembly from District 27 after incumbent Thomas Batten declined to run for re-election. Hickey did not run again in 1998. In 2010, incumbent Heidi Gansert declined to run for re-election in District 25, and Hickey ran to replace her. Hickey served in the Assembly until 2016, when he resigned to join the State Board of Education. Hickey was Minority Floor Leader for the 2013 and 2014 sessions.

In this capacity, Hickey advocated for conservative positions on taxation and immigration. Since leaving office Hickey has continued to engage in political advocacy, such as his opposition to requiring charter schools to pay the prevailing wage on construction projects.

== Elections ==
- 2014 Hickey won the primary election with 4,253 votes (66.70%) against Rick Fineberg. He then won the general election with 16,897 votes (75.02%) against Independent American Party candidate Niklas Putnam.
- 2012 Hickey was unopposed in both the primary and the general election.
- 2010 After Republican Assemblywoman Heidi Gansert declined to run for re-election, Hickey won the Republican primary election with 4,166 votes (44.83%) against Orrin J.H. Johnson and four other candidates. Hickey then won the 2010 general election with 17,949 votes (64.70%) against Democratic nominee Robert "Tuna" Townsend.
- 1996 After Republican Assemblyman Thomas Batten declined to run for re-election, Hickey was unopposed for the 1996 Republican primary and won the 1996 general election with 3,611 votes (48.00%) against Democratic nominee Bonnie Schultz and two other candidates.
