= Jill Tolles =

Republican member of the Nevada Assembly

Member of the Nevada Assembly from the 25th district
- In office November 9, 2016 – November 9, 2022
- Preceded by: Dominic Brunetti
- Succeeded by: Selena La Rue Hatch

Personal details
- Born: April 9, 1974 (age 52) Greensboro, North Carolina, United States
- Party: Republican
- Education: University of Nevada, Reno

Jill Tolles (born April 9, 1974) is an American politician and a former Republican member of the Nevada Assembly. She represented the 25th district, which covers parts of Washoe County.

== Biography ==
Tolles, born in Greensboro, North Carolina, graduated from the University of Nevada, Reno, where she has served as an adjunct professor since 2006.

Tolles declared her candidacy for the Assembly in 2015. She prevailed in both the Republican primary and general election, which she won with over 60% of the vote. She was re-elected in 2018. She ran opposed in 2020, and opted not to run in 2022, being replaced by Selena La Rue Hatch.

== Personal life ==
Tolles married her husband Par in 1998. They have two daughters.

== Political positions ==
Tolles opposes raising the minimum wage. She identifies as fiscally conservative. In March 2017, Tolles was the only Republican member of the Assembly and one of only two Republican legislators, along with Senator Heidi Gansert, to vote in favor of ratification of the Equal Rights Amendment.

== Electoral history ==
Nevada Assembly District 25 election, 2020
| Party | Candidate | Votes | % |
|---|---|---|---|
| Republican | Jill Tolles | 32,513 | 100.0% |
| Total votes | | 32,513 | 100.0% |

Nevada Assembly District 25 election, 2018
| Party | Candidate | Votes | % |
|---|---|---|---|
| Republican | Jill Tolles | 20,383 | 59.01% |
| Democratic | Gregory Shorts | 14,151 | 40.99% |
| Total votes | | 34,540 | 100.0% |

Nevada Assembly District 25 Republican primary, 2016
| Party | Candidate | Votes | % |
|---|---|---|---|
| Republican | Jill Tolles | 3,307 | 54.5% |
| Republican | Jennifer Terhune | 1,726 | 28.4% |
| Republican | Clint Jamison | 619 | 10.2% |
| Republican | Kime King | 420 | 6.9% |
| Total votes | | 6,072 | 100.0% |

Nevada Assembly District 25 election, 2016
| Party | Candidate | Votes | % |
|---|---|---|---|
| Republican | Jill Tolles | 21,950 | 60.6% |
| Democratic | Eli Smith | 14,253 | 39.4% |
| Total votes | | 36,203 | 100.0% |
