= Debbie Smith (Nevada politician) =

American politician (1956–2016)

Member of the Nevada Senate from the 13th district
- In office 2012 – February 21, 2016
- Preceded by: Sheila Leslie
- Succeeded by: Julia Ratti

President of the National Conference of State Legislatures
- In office 2014–2015
- Preceded by: Bruce Starr
- Succeeded by: Curt Bramble

Member of the Nevada Assembly from the 30th district
- In office 2004–2012
- Preceded by: Don Gustavson
- Succeeded by: Michael Sprinkle
- In office 2000–2002
- Preceded by: Jan Evans
- Succeeded by: Don Gustavson

Personal details
- Born: January 14, 1956 Tucson, Arizona
- Died: February 21, 2016 (aged 60) Reno, Nevada
- Party: Democratic
- Spouse: Greg Smith

Debbie Smith (January 14, 1956 – February 21, 2016) was an American politician who served as a member of the Nevada Senate for District 13.

== Career ==
Smith served on the Lander County School Board. Smith has served as President of the Nevada Parent Teacher Association. Smith was a retired Benefits Information Representative for the International Union of Operating Engineers.

Smith had previously served as a member of the Nevada State Assembly from District 30. In the Assembly, Smith served as an Assistant Majority Whip in the 74th and 75th Regular Legislative Session (2007–2009) and Speaker Pro Tempore in the 76th Regular Legislative Session in 2011.

From 2014 to 2015, she served as president of the National Conference of State Legislatures.

== Personal life ==
She lived in Sparks, Nevada. Smith died of brain cancer in Reno, Nevada, on February 21, 2016. Her widower, Greg Smith, would later serve briefly in the seat which she had held.

== Electoral history ==
Nevada State Assembly, Washoe District 30 General Election, 2000
Party	Candidate	Votes	%
Democratic	Debbie Smith	3,990	53.44
Republican	Keith Primus	3,476	46.55

Nevada State Assembly, Washoe District 30 General Election, 2002
Party	Candidate	Votes	%
Democratic	Debbie Smith	4,596	49.8
Republican	Don Gustavson	4,632	50.2

Nevada State Assembly, Washoe District 30 General Election, 2004
Party	Candidate	Votes	%
Democratic	Debbie Smith	7,917	59.04
Republican	Don Gustavson	5,493	40.96

Nevada State Assembly, Washoe District 30 General Election, 2006
Party	Candidate	Votes	%
Democratic	Debbie Smith	7,792	100

Nevada State Assembly, Washoe District 30 General Election, 2008
Party	Candidate	Votes	%
Democratic	Debbie Smith	9,425	65.28
Republican	Trent Baldwin	4,137	28.65
Independent American	Ruth Gillins	876	6.07

Nevada State Assembly, Washoe District 30 General Election, 2010
Party	Candidate	Votes	%
Democratic	Debbie Smith	6,540	61.91
Republican	Kathy Martin	4,024	38.09

Nevada State Senate, District 13 General Election, 2012
Party	Candidate	Votes	%
Democratic	Debbie Smith	25,975	64.73
Republican	Kathy Martin	14,151	35.27
