= Bernice Mathews =

American politician (born 1933)

Member of the Nevada Senate from the Washoe 1 district
- In office 1994–2010
- Preceded by: Diana Glomb
- Succeeded by: Sheila Leslie

Personal details
- Born: November 12, 1933 (age 92) Jackson, Mississippi, U.S.
- Party: Democratic
- Profession: Director, Health Science-Nursing (Emeritus)

Bernice Mathews (born November 12, 1933) was a Democratic member of the Nevada Senate, represented Washoe County District 1 (map) from 1995 to 2010.

== Education ==
Bernice Mathews received her education from the following institutions:

- MEd, Administration of Higher Education, University of Nevada, Reno
- BSN, University of Nevada, Reno

== Political experience ==
Bernice Mathews has had the following political experience:

- Assistant Minority Leader, Senator, Nevada State Senate, 1994-2010
- Former City Councilwoman, Reno City Council

== Caucuses and non-legislative committees ==
Bernice Mathews has been a member of the following committees:

- Member, Governor's Commission on Nursing and Nursing Education, present
- Past Chairman, Reno Civil Service Commission

== Professional experience ==
Bernice Mathews has had the following professional experience:

- Director, Health Science-Nursing (Emeritus), present
- Small Business Owner, present
