= Sarah Peters =

American politician and environmental engineer

Member of the Nevada Assembly from the 24th district
- In office November 7, 2018 – November 6, 2024
- Preceded by: Amber Joiner
- Succeeded by: Erica Roth

Personal details
- Born: 1987 (age 38–39) Silver City, Nevada, U.S.
- Party: Democratic
- Education: University of Nevada, Reno (BS)

Sarah Peters is an American politician and environmental engineer who was a member of the Nevada Assembly. Peters represented the 24th district, which includes Downtown Reno, Nevada.

== Early life and education ==
Peters was born in 1987 in Silver City, Nevada. She earned a Bachelor of Science in environmental engineering from the University of Nevada, Reno and later worked as a project manager. She was the vice-chair and secretary of the Society for Mining, Metallurgy, and Exploration's Reno chapter.

== Career ==
After graduating from college, Peters worked as an engineering intern. In 2015, she became a certified environmental manager. Peters was elected to the Nevada Assembly, defeating three Democratic opponents in the 2018 primary, including one challenger who was supported by the Nevada Assembly Democratic caucus and marijuana industry. She took office on November 7, 2018 after receiving 16,000 votes and facing no challenger. She stated that in the 2019 legislative session she would focus on indigenous rights, environmental issues, and healthcare.

A day after she came out publicly as pansexual, Peter she presented a bill that would require "all single-occupancy public restrooms be gender-neutral". She has also introduced legislation that she describes as strengthening indigenous sovereignty rights within tribal jurisdictions. She sponsored a piece of legislation which made neon the official element of Nevada and encouraged state residents to enroll in health insurance programs. Other bills she has co-sponsored include making "all marijuana testing data" publicly available through a searchable database, strengthening voting rights, and supported an effort which opposed the United States Air Force's acquisition of 1.1 million acres in the Desert National Wildlife Refuge for a bombing range. She is the vice chair of the Health and Human Services committee and sits on two other committees.

== Personal life ==
Peters is married to Matt, a Marine veteran. She came out as bisexual to her family at age 16. In March 2021, she came out publicly as pansexual on the floor of the Nevada Assembly as a part of a speech in support of the Nevada Equal Rights Amendment. Peters told the Las Vegas Review-Journal that at first, because she had a husband and children, she did not speak about her pansexuality, but she later changed her opinion, believing it was an opportunity to come out and support LGBTQ people.

Peters is one of three openly pansexual legislators in the United States, along with Mary González of Texas and Lisa Bunker of New Hampshire. Additionally, she is the first pansexual lawmaker in Nevada.
