= David Bobzien =

American politician

Member of the Reno City Council from the at-large district
- In office December 3, 2014 – January 15, 2019
- Preceded by: Hillary Schieve
- Succeeded by: Devon Reese

Member of the Nevada Assembly from the 24th district
- In office November 8, 2006 – December 3, 2014
- Preceded by: Brooks Holcomb
- Succeeded by: Amber Joiner

Personal details
- Born: David Paul Bobzien, Jr. December 11, 1972 (age 53) Washington, D.C., U.S.
- Party: Democratic
- Children: Luca Carson, Finnegan Walker, Carly Rose, David Paul III
- Education: Boise State University (B.A.); George Mason University (M.P.A.)
- Website: Official website

David Paul Bobzien Jr. (born December 11, 1972) is an American politician. He was a Democratic member of the Nevada Assembly, representing Washoe County District 24 from 2006 to 2014. He attended George Mason University where he received his Bachelor of Arts in Government and Politics. He then received his Master of Public Administration from Boise State University with an emphasis in Natural Resources and Public Lands Policy. On January 15, 2019, Bobzien was appointed by Nevada Governor Steve Sisolak as the Director of the Governor's Office of Energy.

== Legislative Service ==
Bobzien served in the 75th Session of the Nevada Assembly on the Government Affairs (Vice Chairman), Natural Resources, Agriculture and Mining, Education, and Transportation committees.

== Awards ==
- 2009 Assemblyman of the Year, Nevada Conservation League
- Highest-rated freshman legislator of the 2007 session (Las Vegas Review-Journal)
- 2007 Freshman of the Year, Peace Officers Research Association of Nevada
- Winner, Southwest Energy Efficiency Project's Leadership in Energy Efficiency Award
- Distinguished Deed, Nevada Conservation League
- Winner, Nevada EcoNet's Golden Pinecone Award for environmental excellence as a public servant

Political offices
Preceded by Brooks Holcomb	Nevada Assembly; 24th district November 8, 2006 – December 3, 2014	Succeeded by Amber Joiner
Preceded by Hillary Schieve	Reno City Council; At-large district December 3, 2014 – January 15, 2019	Succeeded by Devon Reese
