= Theresa Glomb =

American academic

Academic background
- Education: BA, psychology, 1993, DePaul University; MA, 1995, PhD, 1998, University of Illinois at Urbana–Champaign
- Website: theresaglomb.com

Theresa M. Glomb is an American academic. She is the Toro Company-David M. Lilly Chair in Human Resources Department of Work and Organizations at the University of Minnesota's Carlson School of Management.

== Career ==
Glomb earned her Bachelor of Arts degree in psychology from DePaul University before enrolling at the University of Illinois at Urbana–Champaign for her Master's degree and PhD.

In 2015, Glomb was appointed the inaugural Toro Company-David M. Lilly Chair in Human Resources Department of Work and Organizations.
