= Amber Joiner =

American politician (born 1976)

Member of the Nevada Assembly from the 24th district
- In office December 29, 2014 – February 4, 2019
- Preceded by: David Bobzien
- Succeeded by: Sarah Peters

Personal details
- Born: 1976 (age 49–50) Reno, Nevada, United States
- Party: Democratic
- Education: University of Nevada, Reno; University of Maryland

Amber Joiner (born 1976) is an American politician who served as a member of the Nevada Assembly from 2014 to 2019. First appointed in 2014, she was elected to a full term in 2016. Joiner represents the 24th district, covering part of Reno.

== Early life and education ==
Joiner was born in Reno, Nevada in 1976. She graduated from Robert McQueen High School, and then with a bachelor's degree from the University of Nevada, Reno and a master's degree from the University of Maryland.

== Career ==
Joiner previously served as deputy director of the Nevada Department of Health and Human Services.

In December 2014, Joiner was selected by the Washoe County Commission to replace David Bobzien in the Assembly. Bobzien had resigned in order to accept an appointment to the Reno City Council.

Joiner was elected to a full term in 2016, defeating Republican candidate Jim Riger. On November 27, 2017, Joiner announced she would not seek reelection in 2018.

Joiner supports the legalization of marijuana, and supports increased background checks for gun purchases.

== Personal life ==
Joiner and her husband, Kyle, have two children, Eleanor and Stewart.

== Electoral history ==
Nevada Assembly District 24 election, 2016
| Party | Candidate | Votes | % |
|---|---|---|---|
| Democratic | Amber Joiner | 15,227 | 70.4% |
| Republican | Jim Riger | 6,401 | 29.6% |
| Total votes | | 21,628 | 100.0% |
