= Julia Ratti =

Member of the Nevada Senate

Member of the Nevada Senate from the 13th district
- In office September 27, 2016 – November 19, 2021
- Preceded by: Debbie Smith
- Succeeded by: Skip Daly

Personal details
- Born: 1969 (age 56–57) Reno, Nevada, U.S.
- Party: Democratic
- Spouse: James Cavanaugh
- Education: University of Nevada, Reno (BA); University of San Francisco (MS)

Julia Ratti (born 1969) is an American politician who served as a member of the Nevada Senate from 2016 to 2021. She represented the 13th district, which covers parts of Washoe County, including much of Sparks and Reno.

== Early life and education ==
Ratti was born in Reno, Nevada. She earned a Bachelor of Arts degree in photography and journalism from the University of Nevada, Reno and a Master of Science in non-profit administration from the University of San Francisco in 2004.

== Career ==
In 2008, Ratti was elected to the Sparks City Council, and reelected in 2012. She decided not to run for reelection to the Council in 2016 in order to run for the Senate in a special election to replace Senator Debbie Smith, who had died.

In September 2016, Ratti was appointed to the Senate in order to replace Smith. She won election to the seat in November 2016.

During the 2017 legislative session, she served as chair of Senate Committee on Revenue and Economic Development and vice chair of the Senate Committee on Health and Human Resources.

Ratti resigned from the Senate on November 19, 2021.

== Personal life ==
Ratti is married to James Cavanaugh.

== Electoral history ==
Sparks City Council Ward 1 election, 2008
Party	Candidate	Votes	%
Nonpartisan	Julia Ratti	20,188	66.72
Nonpartisan	Larry Wilson	10,068	33.28
Total votes		30,256	100.00

Sparks City Council Ward 1 election, 2012 (Data Unavailable)
Party	Candidate	Votes	%
Total votes			100.00

Nevada Senate District 13 appointment, 2016
Party	Candidate	Votes	%
Democratic	Julia Ratti	10	100.00
Republican	Kent Bailey	0	0.00
Total votes		10	100.00

Nevada Senate District 13 election, 2016
Party	Candidate	Votes	%
Democratic	Julia Ratti	27,280	59.96
Republican	Kent Bailey	15,811	34.75
Libertarian	Brandon Jacobs	2,406	5.29
Total votes		45,497	100.00
