= Jan Evans =

American politician (1937–2000)

Janice W. Evans

Janice W. Evans (November 22, 1937 – April 24, 2000) was an American politician in Nevada.

Born in Cleveland, Ohio, Evans received her bachelor's degree from University of Northern Colorado and her master's degree from University of Nevada, Reno. She was a development officer and lived in Sparks, Nevada. Evans served in the Nevada Assembly from 1987 until her death in 2000 and was a Democrat.

She lived in Sparks. She served as Speaker Pro Tem in the Assembly. She sponsored legislation for a study of juvenile justice and funding for what became the Jan Evans Juvenile Justice Center followed.
