= Bernie Anderson (teacher-legislator) =

American politician

Bernard "Bernie" Anderson (May 1942 – January 10, 2014) was a teacher from Sparks, Nevada who spent eighteen years as a member of the Nevada Assembly.

== Background ==
Anderson was born in May 1942 in Reno, Nevada to Bernard and Beatrice (Keogh) Anderson. He attended Bishop Manogue High School and the University of Nevada, Reno, where he earned a B.S. degree in education. He would spend over 31 years as a teacher of American government in Sparks, ending at Edward C. Reed High School. He became active in the Nevada State Education Association (a National Education Association affiliate; he served on the NEA board of directors), and continued his studies at UNR, where at one point he, his daughter Cairn, and future Assemblyman Jason Geddes were active together in student government in the late 1980s.

== Legislature ==
Anderson, a Democrat, was first elected to the Assembly from Washoe County in 1990 and served as an assemblyman through the 2009 session and 2010 special session. He became chairman of the Assembly's standing committee on the judiciary (1997-2009), and also served as Majority Whip and Speaker Pro Tempore.

== Personal life ==
Anderson was active in the Retired Public Employees of Nevada, and served in the Nevada National Guard. He married Clyda Hooper; they had two daughters, Cairn Louise and Natha Clyde.

Natha Anderson, herself a teacher and Nevada State Education Association leader, would later follow Bernie into the Assembly.
