= Diana Glomb =

American politician and social worker

Diana M. Glomb-Rogan (born February 3, 1947) is an American politician and social worker.

Born in Chicago, Illinois, Glob received her bachelor's degree in elementary education from the University of Louisiana at Monroe and her master's degree in social work from Louisiana State University. Glomb was a social worker and lived in Reno, Nevada. From 1993 to 1997, Glomb served in the Nevada State Senate and was a Democrat. She was the first woman on the Senate Finance Committee.
