= 1940 United States Senate elections =

- November 5, 1940
- Class 1

34 of the 96 seats in the United States Senate 49 seats needed for a majority
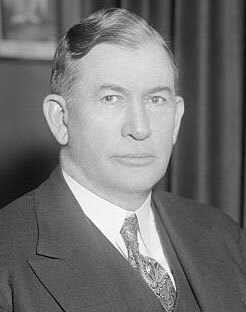

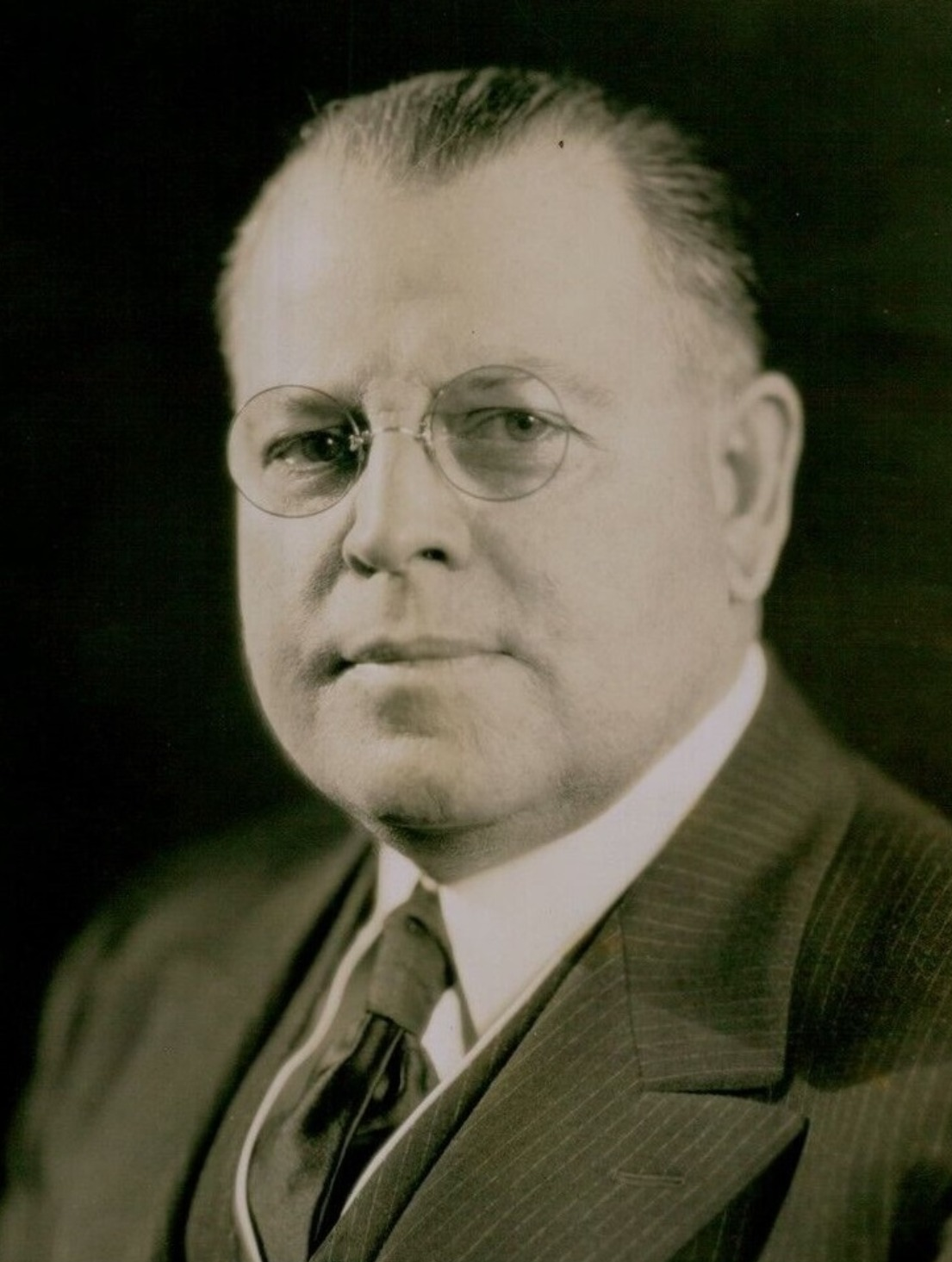
	Majority party	Minority party
Leader	Alben Barkley	Warren Austin (acting)
Party	Democratic	Republican
Leader since	July 22, 1937	January 3, 1940
Leader's seat	Kentucky	Vermont
Seats before	69	24
Seats after	66	28
Seat change	▼3	▲4
Popular vote	19,715,831	19,831,926
Percentage	47.5%	47.8%
Seats up	25	9
Races won	22	13
	Third party	Fourth party
Party	Farmer–Labor	Progressive
Seats before	1	1
Seats won	0	1
Seat change	▼1	Steady
Popular vote	310,875	605,609
Percentage	2.57%	1.5%
Seats up	1	1
Races won	0	1
	Fifth party
Party	Independent
Seats before	1
Seats after	1
Seat change	Steady
Seats up	0
Races won	0
- Results of the elections: Democratic gain Democratic hold Republican gain Republican hold Progressive hold No election
Majority Leader before election
Alben Barkley
Democratic
Elected Majority Leader
Alben Barkley
Democratic

The 1940 United States Senate elections coincided with the election of Franklin D. Roosevelt to his third term as president. The 32 seats of Class 1 were contested in regular elections, and special elections were held to fill vacancies.

Although Roosevelt was re-elected to an unprecedented third term, support for his administration had dropped somewhat after eight years, and the Republican opposition gained three seats from the Democrats. However, the New Deal Democrats regained firm control of both the House and Senate because the Progressives dominated the election. The Minnesota Farmer–Labor Party also disappeared from the Senate, as Henrik Shipstead joined the Republican party and Ernest Lundeen had died during the preceding term. Senator Harry S. Truman of Missouri was elected to his final term in the Senate in 1940. Truman resigned in 1945 to serve as President Roosevelt's third Vice President.

Republicans later gained an additional seat through an appointment in Colorado.

== Gains, losses, and holds ==
=== Retirements ===
One Republican and two Democrats retired instead of seeking re-election. One Republican retired instead of seeking election to finish the unexpired term.

State	Senator	Replaced by
Maine	Frederick Hale	Owen Brewster
Ohio	Vic Donahey	Harold H. Burton
Vermont (special)	Ernest W. Gibson Jr.	George Aiken
Washington	Lewis B. Schwellenbach	Monrad Wallgren

=== Defeats ===
Five Democrats and two Republicans sought re-election but lost in the primary or general election. One Democrat sought election to finish the unexpired term but lost in the general election.

State	Senator	Replaced by
Arizona	Henry F. Ashurst	Ernest McFarland
Delaware	John G. Townsend Jr.	James M. Tunnell
Illinois	James M. Slattery	C. Wayland Brooks
Indiana	Sherman Minton	Raymond E. Willis
Nebraska	Edward R. Burke	Hugh A. Butler
North Dakota	Lynn Frazier	William Langer
Utah	William H. King	Abe Murdock
West Virginia	Rush Holt Sr.	Harley M. Kilgore

=== Post-election changes ===
State	Senator	Replaced by
Nevada	Key Pittman	Berkeley L. Bunker
Arkansas	John E. Miller	G. Lloyd Spencer
Colorado	Alva B. Adams	Eugene Donald Millikin
South Carolina	James F. Byrnes	Alva M. Lumpkin
South Carolina	Alva M. Lumpkin	Roger C. Peace
South Carolina	Roger C. Peace	Burnet R. Maybank
Texas	Morris Sheppard	Andrew Jackson Houston
Texas	Andrew Jackson Houston	W. Lee O'Daniel
Mississippi	Pat Harrison	James Eastland
Mississippi	James Eastland	Wall Doxey
West Virginia	Matthew M. Neely	Joseph Rosier

=== Party switches ===
One Farmer-Labor senator was re-elected as a Republican.

State	Senator	Replaced by
Minnesota	Henrik Shipstead	Henrik Shipstead

== Change in composition ==
=== Before the elections ===
		D_{1}	D_{2}	D_{3}	D_{4}	D_{5}	D_{6}	D_{7}	D_{8}
D_{18}	D_{17}	D_{16}	D_{15}	D_{14}	D_{13}	D_{12}	D_{11}	D_{10}	D_{9}
D_{19}	D_{20}	D_{21}	D_{22}	D_{23}	D_{24}	D_{25}	D_{26}	D_{27}	D_{28}
D_{38}	D_{37}	D_{36}	D_{35}	D_{34}	D_{33}	D_{32}	D_{31}	D_{30}	D_{29}
D_{39}	D_{40}	D_{41}	D_{42}	D_{43}	D_{44}	D_{45} Ariz. Ran	D_{46} Conn. Ran	D_{47} Fla. Ran	D_{48} Ill. (sp); Ran
Majority →									D_{49} Ind. Ran
D_{58} N.M. Ran	D_{57} Nev. Ran	D_{56} Neb. Ran	D_{55} Mont. Ran	D_{54} Mo. Ran	D_{53} Miss. Ran	D_{52} Mass. Ran	D_{51} Md. Ran	D_{50} Ky. (sp); Ran	D_{49} Ind. Ran
D_{59} N.Y. Ran	D_{60} Ohio; Ran	D_{61} Pa. Ran	D_{62} R.I. Ran	D_{63} Tenn. Ran	D_{64} Texas; Ran	D_{65} Utah; Ran	D_{66} Va. Ran	D_{67} Wash. Retired	D_{68} W.Va. Ran
R_{19} Maine; Retired	R_{20} Mich. Ran	R_{21} N.J. Ran	R_{22} N.D. Ran	R_{23} Vt. (reg); Ran	R_{24} Vt. (sp); Retired	FL_{1} Minn. Ran	P_{1} Wis. Ran	I_{1}	D_{69} Wyo. Ran
R_{18} Idaho (sp); Ran	R_{17} Del. Ran	R_{16} Calif. Ran	R_{15}	R_{14}	R_{13}	R_{12}	R_{11}	R_{10}	R_{9}
		R_{1}	R_{2}	R_{3}	R_{4}	R_{5}	R_{6}	R_{7}	R_{8}

=== Election results ===
		D_{1}	D_{2}	D_{3}	D_{4}	D_{5}	D_{6}	D_{7}	D_{8}
D_{18}	D_{17}	D_{16}	D_{15}	D_{14}	D_{13}	D_{12}	D_{11}	D_{10}	D_{9}
D_{19}	D_{20}	D_{21}	D_{22}	D_{23}	D_{24}	D_{25}	D_{26}	D_{27}	D_{28}
D_{38}	D_{37}	D_{36}	D_{35}	D_{34}	D_{33}	D_{32}	D_{31}	D_{30}	D_{29}
D_{39}	D_{40}	D_{41}	D_{42}	D_{43}	D_{44}	D_{45} Ariz. Hold	D_{46} Conn. Re-elected	D_{47} Fla. Re-elected	D_{48} Ky. (sp); Elected (Note: Appointee elected)
Majority →									D_{49} Md. Re-elected
D_{58} R.I. Re-elected	D_{57} Pa. Re-elected	D_{56} N.Y. Re-elected	D_{55} N.M. Re-elected	D_{54} Nev. Re-elected	D_{53} Mont. Re-elected	D_{52} Mo. Re-elected	D_{51} Miss. Re-elected	D_{50} Mass. Re-elected	D_{49} Md. Re-elected
D_{59} Tenn. Re-elected	D_{60} Texas; Re-elected	D_{61} Utah; Hold	D_{62} Va. Re-elected	D_{63} Wash. Hold	D_{64} W.Va. Hold	D_{65} Wyo. Re-elected	D_{66} Del. Gain	I_{1}	P_{1} Wis. Re-elected
R_{19} Mich. Re-elected	R_{20} N.J. Re-elected	R_{21} N.D. Hold	R_{22} Vt. (reg); Re-elected	R_{23} Vt. (sp); Hold	R_{24} Ill. (sp); Gain (Note: Appointee defeated)	R_{25} Ind. Gain	R_{26} Minn. Re-elected under different party	R_{27} Neb. Gain	R_{28} Ohio; Gain
R_{18} Maine; Hold	R_{17} Idaho (sp); Elected	R_{16} Calif. Re-elected	R_{15}	R_{14}	R_{13}	R_{12}	R_{11}	R_{10}	R_{9}
		R_{1}	R_{2}	R_{3}	R_{4}	R_{5}	R_{6}	R_{7}	R_{8}

Key

D_{#}	Democratic
FL_{#}	Farmer–Labor
P_{#}	Progressive
R_{#}	Republican
I_{#}	Independent

== Race summaries ==
=== Special elections during the 76th Congress ===
In these special elections, the winner elected during 1940 and seated once qualified; ordered by election date.

State	Incumbent			Results	Candidates
State	Senator	Party	Electoral history	Results	Candidates
Idaho (Class 2)	John Thomas	Republican	1928 (appointed); 1928 (special); 1932 (lost); 1940 (appointed)	Interim appointee elected November 5, 1940.	▌ ✓ John Thomas (Republican) 53.0%; ▌Glen H. Taylor (Democratic) 47.0%
Illinois (Class 2)	James M. Slattery	Democratic	1939 (appointed)	Interim appointee lost election to finish term. New senator elected November 5, 1940. Republican gain.	▌ ✓ C. Wayland Brooks (Republican) 50.1%; ▌James M. Slattery (Democratic) 49.6%
Kentucky (Class 2)	Happy Chandler	Democratic	1939 (appointed)	Interim appointee elected November 5, 1940.	▌ ✓ Happy Chandler (Democratic) 58.3%; ▌Walter B. Smith (Republican) 41.7%
Vermont (Class 3)	Ernest W. Gibson Jr.	Republican	1940 (appointed)	Interim appointee retired. New senator elected November 5, 1940. Republican hold.	▌ ✓ George Aiken (Republican) 61.6%; ▌Herbert B. Comings (Democratic) 38.4%

=== Races leading to the 77th Congress ===
In these regular elections, the winners were elected for the term beginning January 3, 1941; ordered by state.

All of the elections involved the Class 1 seats.

State	Incumbent			Results	Candidates
State	Senator	Party	Electoral history	Results	Candidates
Arizona	Henry F. Ashurst	Democratic	1912; 1916; 1922; 1928; 1934	Incumbent lost renomination. New senator elected. Democratic hold.	▌ ✓ Ernest McFarland (Democratic) 71.6%; ▌I. A. Jennings (Republican) 28.0%; ▌A. Walter Gehres (Prohibition) 0.4%
California	Hiram Johnson	Republican	1916; 1922; 1928; 1934	Incumbent re-elected.	▌ ✓ Hiram Johnson (Republican) 82.5%; ▌Fred Dyster (Prohibition) 13.5%; ▌Anita Whitney (Communist) 3.6%
Connecticut	Francis T. Maloney	Democratic	1934	Incumbent re-elected.	▌ ✓ Francis T. Maloney (Democratic) 53.2%; ▌Paul L. Cornell (Republican) 45.7%
Delaware	John G. Townsend Jr.	Republican	1928; 1934	Incumbent lost re-election. New senator elected. Democratic gain.	▌ ✓ James M. Tunnell (Democratic) 50.6%; ▌John G. Townsend Jr. (Republican) 47.3%; ▌William F. Allen (Liberal Democratic) 2.1%
Florida	Charles O. Andrews	Democratic	1936 (special)	Incumbent re-elected.	▌ ✓ Charles O. Andrews (Democratic); Unopposed
Indiana	Sherman Minton	Democratic	1934	Incumbent lost re-election. New senator elected. Republican gain.	▌ ✓ Raymond E. Willis (Republican) 50.5%; ▌Sherman Minton (Democratic) 49.1%; ▌Carl W. Thompson (Prohibition) 0.3%; ▌John H. Kingsbury (Socialist) 0.1%
Maine	Frederick Hale	Republican	1916; 1922; 1928; 1934	Incumbent retired. New senator elected. Republican hold.	▌ ✓ Owen Brewster (Republican) 58.6%; ▌Louis J. Brann (Democratic) 41.3%
Maryland	George L. P. Radcliffe	Democratic	1934	Incumbent re-elected.	▌ ✓ George L. P. Radcliffe (Democratic) 64.7%; ▌Harry Nice (Republican) 33.5%
Massachusetts	David I. Walsh	Democratic	1918; 1924 (lost); 1926 (special); 1928; 1934	Incumbent re-elected.	▌ ✓ David I. Walsh (Democratic) 55.6%; ▌Henry Parkman Jr. (Republican) 42.8%
Michigan	Arthur Vandenberg	Republican	1928 (appointed); 1928 (special); 1928; 1934	Incumbent re-elected.	▌ ✓ Arthur Vandenberg (Republican) 52.7%; ▌Frank Fitzpatrick (Democratic) 47.0%
Minnesota	Henrik Shipstead	Farmer–Labor	1922; 1928; 1934	Incumbent re-elected as a Republican. Republican gain.	▌ ✓ Henrik Shipstead (Republican) 53.0%; ▌Elmer A. Benson (Farmer–Labor) 25.7%; ▌John E. Regan (Democratic) 20.6%
Mississippi	Theodore G. Bilbo	Democratic	1934	Incumbent re-elected.	▌ ✓ Theodore G. Bilbo (Democratic); Unopposed
Missouri	Harry S. Truman	Democratic	1934	Incumbent re-elected.	▌ ✓ Harry S. Truman (Democratic) 51.2%; ▌Manvel H. Davis (Republican) 48.7%; ▌W. F. Rinck (Socialist) 0.1%; ▌Theodore Baeff (Socialist Labor) 0.01%
Montana	Burton K. Wheeler	Democratic	1922; 1928; 1934	Incumbent re-elected.	▌ ✓ Burton K. Wheeler (Democratic) 73.4%; ▌E. K. Cheadle (Republican) 26.6%
Nebraska	Edward R. Burke	Democratic	1934	Incumbent lost renomination. New senator elected. Republican gain.	▌ ✓ Hugh A. Butler (Republican) 57.0%; ▌Robert Leroy Cochran (Democratic) 41.5%
Nevada	Key Pittman	Democratic	1913 (special); 1916; 1922; 1928; 1934	Incumbent re-elected. Winner died November 10, 1940, and Berkeley L. Bunker (D) was appointed both to finish the term and to start the next term.	▌ ✓ Key Pittman (Democratic) 60.5%; ▌Samuel Platt (Republican) 39.5%
New Jersey	W. Warren Barbour	Republican	1931 (appointed); 1932 (special); 1936 (lost); 1938 (special)	Incumbent re-elected.	▌ ✓ W. Warren Barbour (Republican) 55.1%; ▌James H. R. Cromwell (Democratic) 44.1%
New Mexico	Dennis Chávez	Democratic	1935 (appointed); 1936 (special)	Incumbent re-elected.	▌ ✓ Dennis Chávez (Democratic) 56.0%; ▌Albert K. Mitchell (Republican) 44.1%
New York	James M. Mead	Democratic	1938 (special)	Incumbent re-elected.	▌ ✓ James M. Mead (Democratic) 53.3%; ▌Bruce Fairchild Barton (Republican) 46.7%
North Dakota	Lynn Frazier	Republican/ Nonpartisan League	1922; 1928; 1934	Incumbent lost renomination. New senator elected. Republican hold.	▌ ✓ William Langer (Republican-NPL) 38.1%; ▌William Lemke (Independent) 35.1%; ▌Charles V. Vogel (Democratic) 26.5%
Ohio	Vic Donahey	Democratic	1934	Incumbent retired. New senator elected. Republican gain.	▌ ✓ Harold H. Burton (Republican) 52.4%; ▌John McSweeney (Democratic) 47.6%
Pennsylvania	Joseph F. Guffey	Democratic	1934	Incumbent re-elected.	▌ ✓ Joseph F. Guffey (Democratic) 51.8%; ▌Jay Cooke (Republican) 47.4%
Rhode Island	Peter G. Gerry	Democratic	1916; 1922; 1928 (lost); 1934	Incumbent re-elected.	▌ ✓ Peter G. Gerry (Democratic) 55.2%; ▌James O. McManus (Republican) 44.8%
Tennessee	Kenneth McKellar	Democratic	1916; 1922; 1928; 1934	Incumbent re-elected.	▌ ✓ Kenneth McKellar (Democratic) 70.8%; ▌Howard Baker Sr. (Republican) 29.2%
Texas	Tom Connally	Democratic	1928; 1934	Incumbent re-elected.	▌ ✓ Tom Connally (Democratic) 94.3%; ▌George I. Shannon (Republican) 5.7%
Utah	William H. King	Democratic	1916; 1922; 1928 (lost); 1934	Incumbent lost renomination. New senator elected. Democratic hold.	▌ ✓ Abe Murdock (Democratic) 62.9%; ▌Philo Farnsworth (Republican) 37.2%
Vermont	Warren Austin	Republican	1931 (special); 1934	Incumbent re-elected.	▌ ✓ Warren Austin (Republican) 66.5%; ▌Ona S. Searles (Democratic) 33.6%
Virginia	Harry F. Byrd	Democratic	1933 (appointed); 1933 (special); 1934	Incumbent re-elected.	▌ ✓ Harry F. Byrd (Democratic) 93.3
Washington	Lewis B. Schwellenbach	Democratic	1934	Incumbent retired. New senator elected. Democratic hold. Incumbent resigned December 16, 1940. Winner appointed to finish the term.	▌ ✓ Monrad Wallgren (Democratic) 54.2%; ▌Stephen F. Chadwick (Republican) 45.8%
West Virginia	Rush Holt Sr.	Democratic	1934	Incumbent lost renomination. New senator elected. Democratic hold.	▌ ✓ Harley M. Kilgore (Democratic) 56.3%; ▌Thomas Sweeney (Republican) 43.7%
Wisconsin	Robert M. La Follette Jr.	Progressive	1925 (special); 1928; 1934	Incumbent re-elected.	▌ ✓ Robert M. La Follette Jr. (Progressive) 45.3%; ▌Fred H. Clausen (Republican) 41.4%; ▌James E. Finnegan (Democratic) 13.2%
Wyoming	Joseph C. O'Mahoney	Democratic	1933 (appointed); 1934	Incumbent re-elected.	▌ ✓ Joseph C. O'Mahoney (Democratic) 58.7%; ▌Milward Simpson (Republican) 41.3%

== Closest races ==
Thirteen races had a margin of victory under 10%:

State	Party of winner	Margin
Illinois	Republican (flip)	0.7%
Indiana	Republican (flip)	1.4%
Missouri	Democratic	2.5%
North Dakota	Republican	3.0%
Delaware	Democratic (flip)	3.3%
Wisconsin	Progressive	3.9%
Pennsylvania	Democratic	4.4%
Ohio	Republican (flip)	4.8%
Michigan	Republican	5.7%
Idaho (special)	Republican	5.9%
New York	Democratic	6.6%
Connecticut	Democratic	7.5%
Washington	Democratic	8.4%

There is no tipping point state.

== Arizona ==
1940 United States Senate election in Arizona
- November 3, 1940
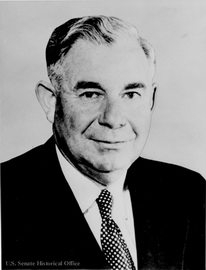

Nominee	Ernest McFarland	Irving A. Jennings Sr.
Party	Democratic	Republican
Popular vote	101,495	29,657
Percentage	71.61%	27.98%
- County results McFarland: 60–70% 70–80% 80–90%
U.S. senator before election
Henry F. Ashurst
Democratic
Elected U.S. Senator
Ernest McFarland
Democratic

1940 United States Senate election in Arizona
Party	Candidate	Votes	%
Democratic	Ernest McFarland	101,495	71.6
Republican	Irving A. Jennings Sr.	39,657	28
Prohibition	A. Walter Gehres	579	0.4
Majority		61,838	43.63
Turnout		141,731	
Democratic hold			

== California ==
1940 United States Senate election in California
- November 5, 1940
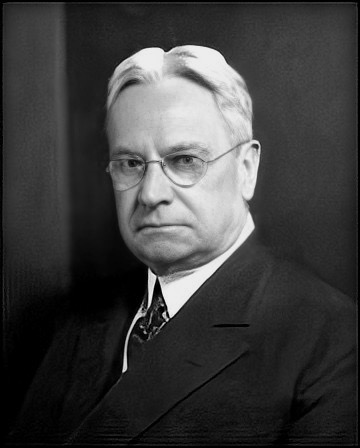

Nominee	Hiram Johnson	Fred Dyster
Party	Republican	Prohibition
Alliance	Democratic; Progressive
Popular vote	2,238,899	366,044
Percentage	82.62%	13.51%
- County results Johnson: 70–80% 80–90% >90%
U.S. senator before election
Hiram Johnson
Republican
Elected U.S. Senator
Hiram Johnson
Republican

United States Senate election in California of 1940
Party	Candidate	Votes	%
Republican	Hiram W. Johnson (Incumbent)	2,238,899	82.50
Prohibition	Fred Dyster	366,044	13.49
Communist	Anita Whitney	97,478	3.59
Write-In	John Anson Ford	7,415	0.27
None	Scattering	4,029	0.15
Majority		1,872,855	69.01
Turnout		2,713,865	
Republican hold			

== Connecticut ==
1940 United States Senate election in Connecticut
- November 5, 1940
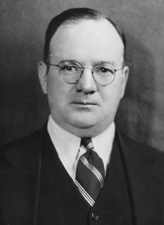

Nominee	Francis T. Maloney	Paul L. Cornell
Party	Democratic	Republican
Alliance		Union
Popular vote	416,740	358,313
Percentage	53.15%	45.70%
- Maloney: 40–50% 50–60% 60–70% Cornell: 50–60% 60–70% 70–80%
U.S. senator before election
Francis T. Maloney
Democratic
Elected U.S. Senator
Francis T. Maloney
Democratic

1940 United States Senate election in Connecticut
Party	Candidate	Votes	%
Democratic	Francis T. Maloney (Incumbent)	416,740	53.15
Republican	Paul L. Cornell	358,313	45.70
Socialist	Kenneth W. Thurlow	6,557	0.84
Socialist Labor	James A. Hutchin	1,343	0,17
Communist	Isadore Wofsy	1,114	0,14
Majority		58,427	12.45
Turnout		784,067	
Democratic hold			

== Delaware ==
1940 United States Senate election in Delaware
- November 5, 1940
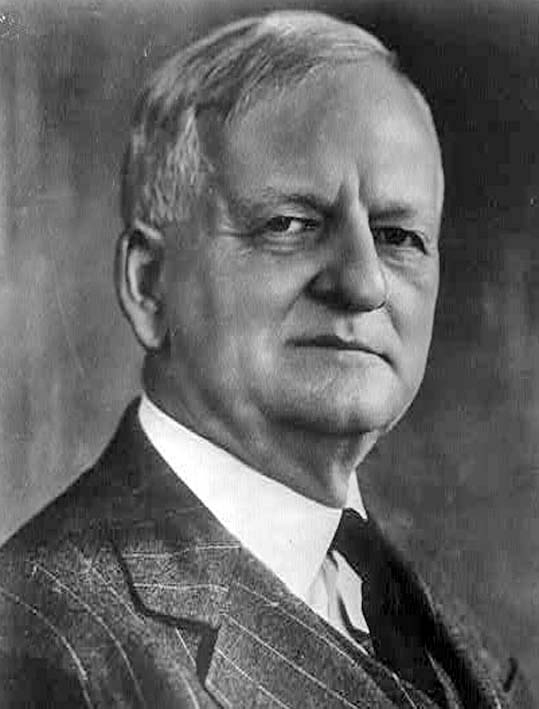

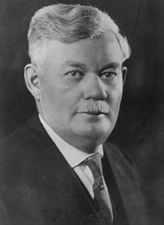
Nominee	James M. Tunnell	John G. Townsend Jr.
Party	Democratic	Republican
Popular vote	68,294	63,799
Percentage	50.63%	47.30%
- County results Tunnell: 50–60%
U.S. senator before election
John G. Townsend Jr.
Republican
Elected U.S. Senator
James M. Tunnell
Democratic

1940 United States Senate election in Delaware
Party	Candidate	Votes	%
Democratic	James M. Tunnell	68,294	50.63
Republican	John G. Townsend Jr. (Incumbent)	63,799	47.30
Independent Democratic	William F. Allen	2,786	2.07
Majority		4,495	3.33
Turnout		134,879	
Democratic gain from Republican			

== Florida ==
1940 United States Senate election in Florida
- November 5, 1940
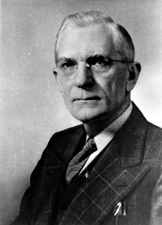
Nominee	Charles O. Andrews
Party	Democratic
Popular vote	323,216
Percentage	100.0%
- County results Andrews: 90–100%
U.S. senator before election
Charles O. Andrews
Democratic
Elected U.S. Senator
Charles O. Andrews
Democratic

1940 United States Senate election in Florida
Party	Candidate	Votes	%
Democratic	Charles O. Andrews (Incumbent)	323,216	100.00
Democratic hold			

== Idaho (special) ==
1940 United States Senate special election in Idaho
- November 5, 1940
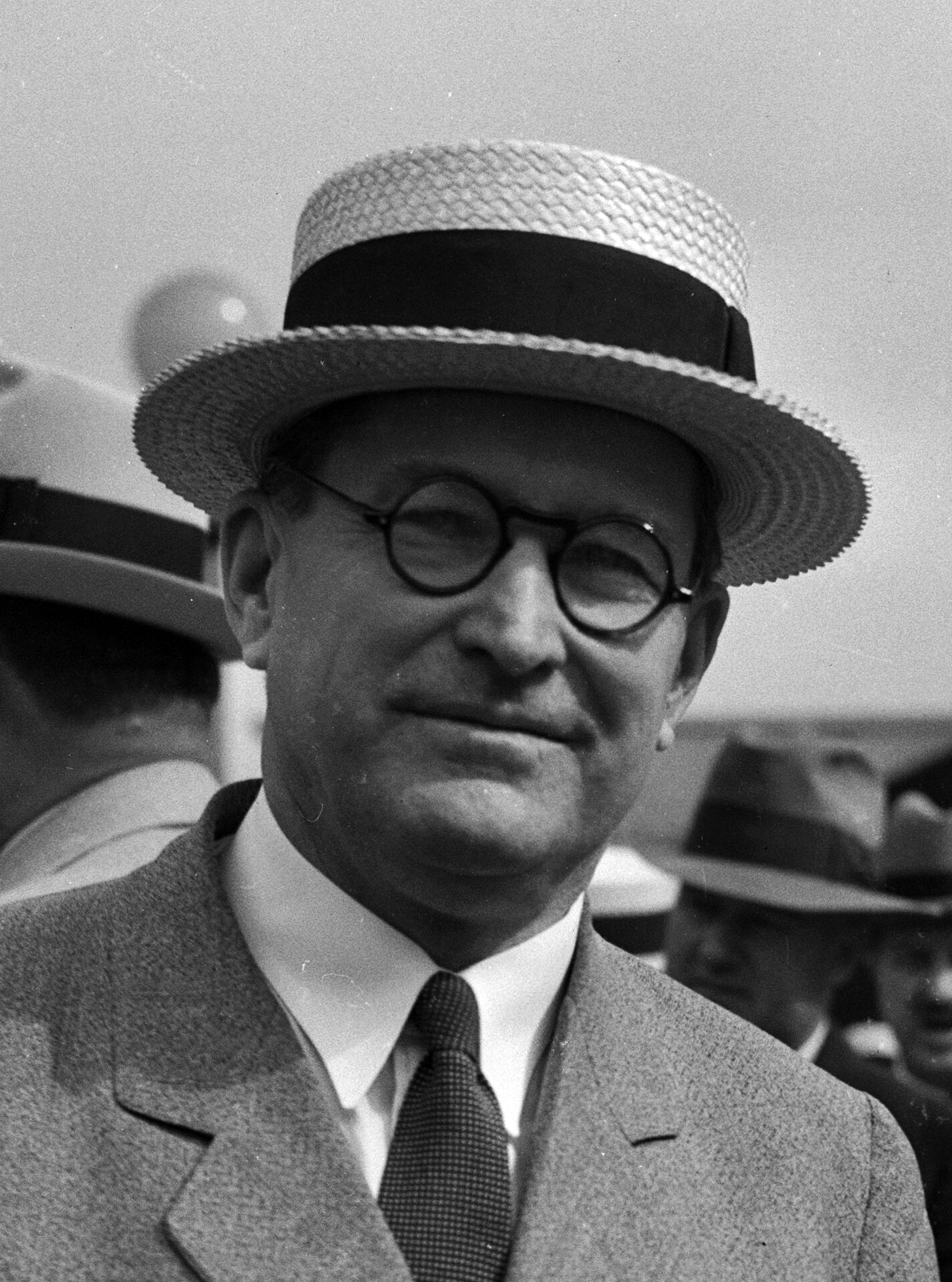

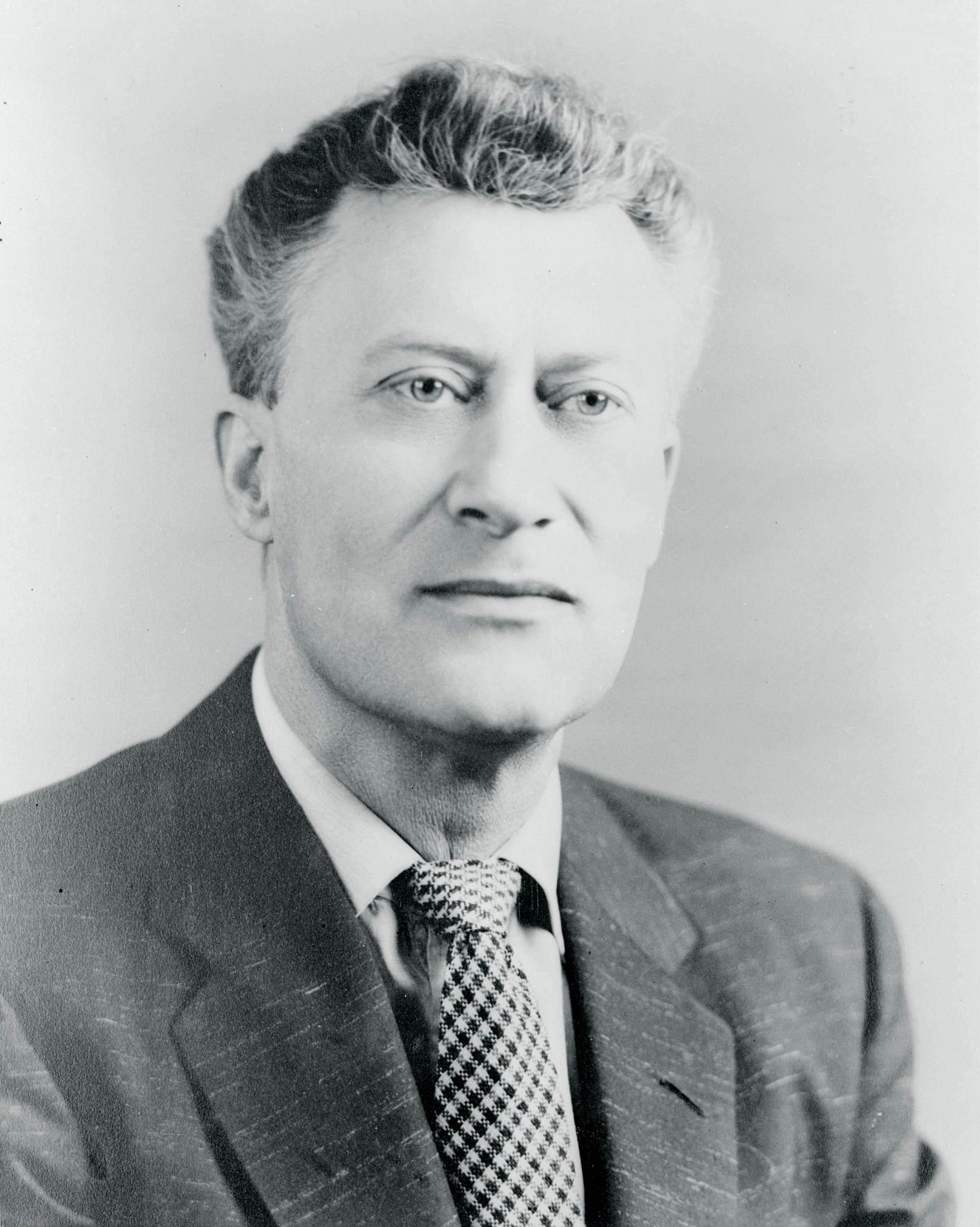
Nominee	John Thomas	Glen H. Taylor
Party	Republican	Democratic
Popular vote	124,535	110,614
Percentage	52.96%	47.04%
- County results Thomas: 50–60% 60–70% 80–90% Taylor: 50–60% 60–70%
U.S. senator before election
John Thomas
Republican
Elected U.S. Senator
John Thomas
Republican

1940 United States Senate special election in Idaho
Party	Candidate	Votes	%
Republican	John Thomas	124,535	52.96
Democratic	Glen H. Taylor	110,614	47.04
Majority		13,921	5.92
Turnout		235,149	
Republican hold			

== Illinois (special) ==
1940 United States Senate special election in Illinois
- November 5, 1940
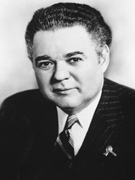

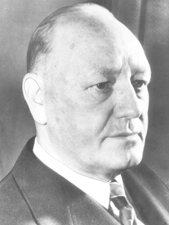
Nominee	Charles W. Brooks	James M. Slattery
Party	Republican	Democratic
Popular vote	2,045,924	2,025,097
Percentage	50.07%	49.56%
- Results by county Brooks: 40–50% 50–60% 60–70% 70–80% Slattery: 50–60%
U.S. senator before election
James M. Slattery
Democratic
Elected U.S. senator
Charles W. Brooks
Republican

1940 United States Senate special election in Illinois
Party	Candidate	Votes	%
Republican	Charles W. Brooks	2,045,924	50.07
Democratic	James M. Slattery (Incumbent)	2,025,097	49.56
Prohibition	Enoch A. Holtwick	8,625	0.21
Socialist	Clarence H. Mayer	6,517	0.16
None	Scattering	16	0.00
Majority		20,827	0.51
Turnout		4,086,179	
Republican hold			

== Indiana ==
1940 United States Senate election in Indiana
- November 5, 1940
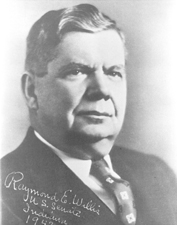

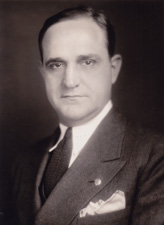
Nominee	Raymond E. Willis	Sherman Minton
Party	Republican	Democratic
Popular vote	888,070	864,803
Percentage	50.45%	49.13%
- County results Willis: 50–60% 60–70% Minton: 40–50% 50–60% 60–70%
U.S. senator before election
Sherman Minton
Democratic
Elected U.S. Senator
Raymond E. Willis
Republican

1940 United States Senate election in Indiana
Party	Candidate	Votes	%
Republican	Raymond E. Willis	888,070	50.45
Democratic	Sherman Minton (Incumbent)	864,803	49.13
Prohibition	Carl W. Thompson	5,621	0.32
Socialist	John H. Kingsbury	1,751	0.10
Majority		23,267	1.32
Turnout		1,760,245	
Republican gain from Democratic			

== Kentucky (special) ==
1940 United States Senate special election in Kentucky
- November 5, 1940
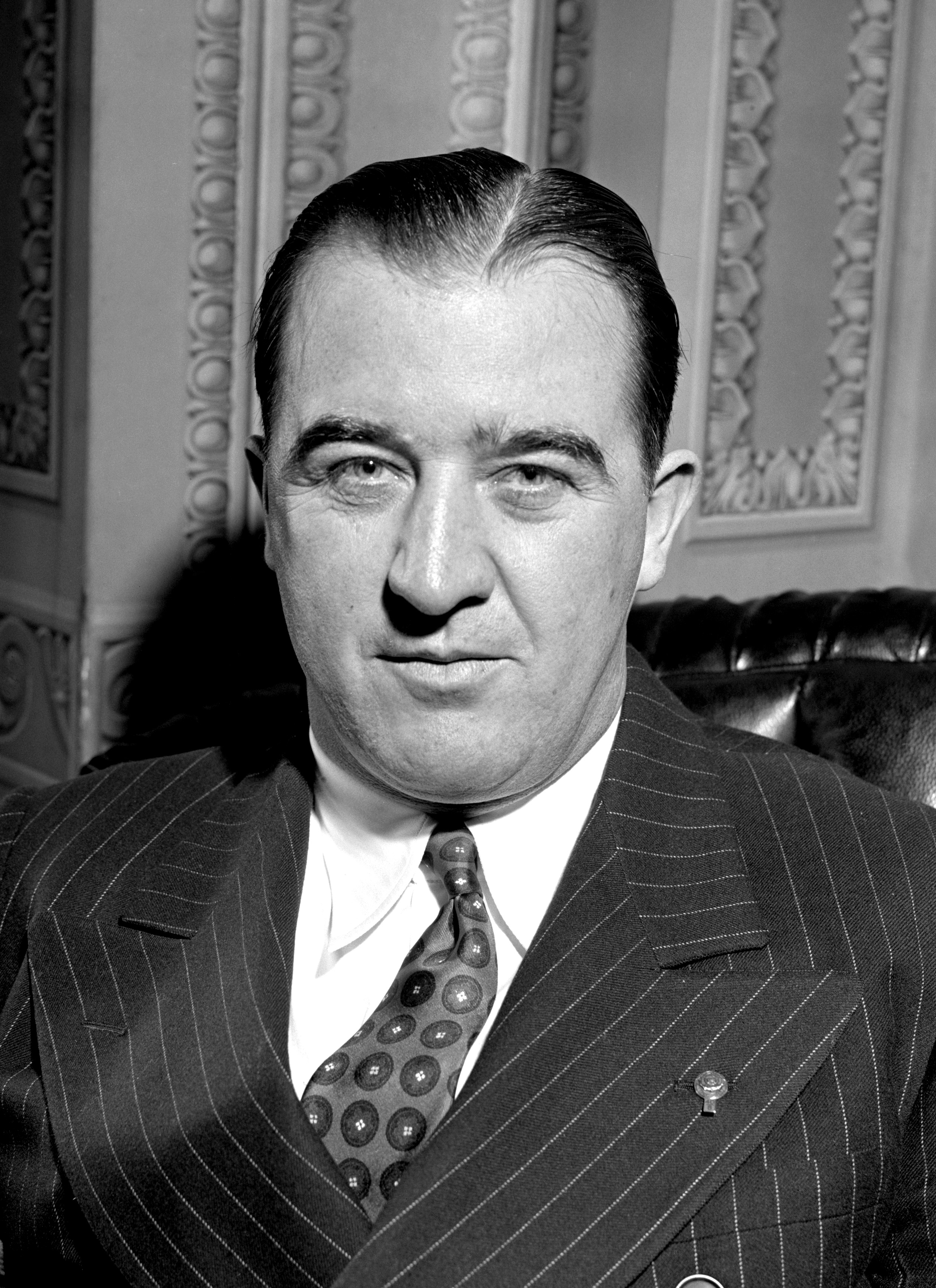

Nominee	Happy Chandler	Walter B. Smith
Party	Democratic	Republican
Popular vote	561,151	401,812
Percentage	58.27%	41.73%
- County results Chandler: 50–60% 60–70% 70–80% 80–90% Smith: 50–60% 60–70% 70–80% 80–90%
U.S. senator before election
Happy Chandler
Democratic
Elected U.S. Senator
Happy Chandler
Democratic

1940 United States Senate special election in Kentucky
Party	Candidate	Votes	%
Democratic	Happy Chandler (Incumbent)	561,151	58.27
Republican	Walter B. Smith	401,812	41.73
Majority		159,339	16.54
Turnout		962,963	
Democratic hold			

== Maine ==
1940 United States Senate election in Maine
- September 9, 1940
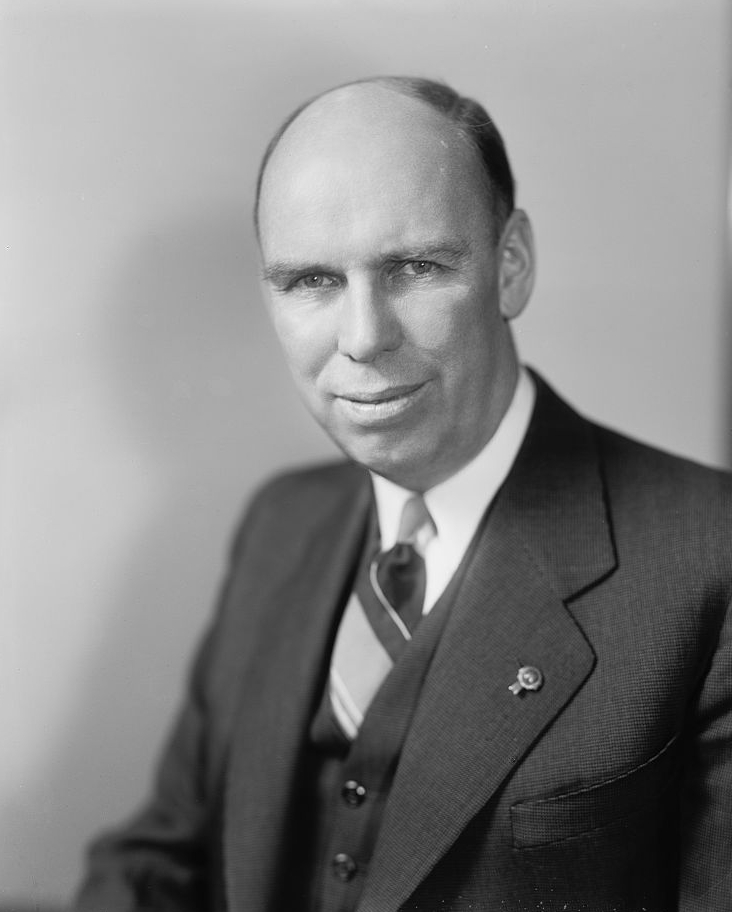

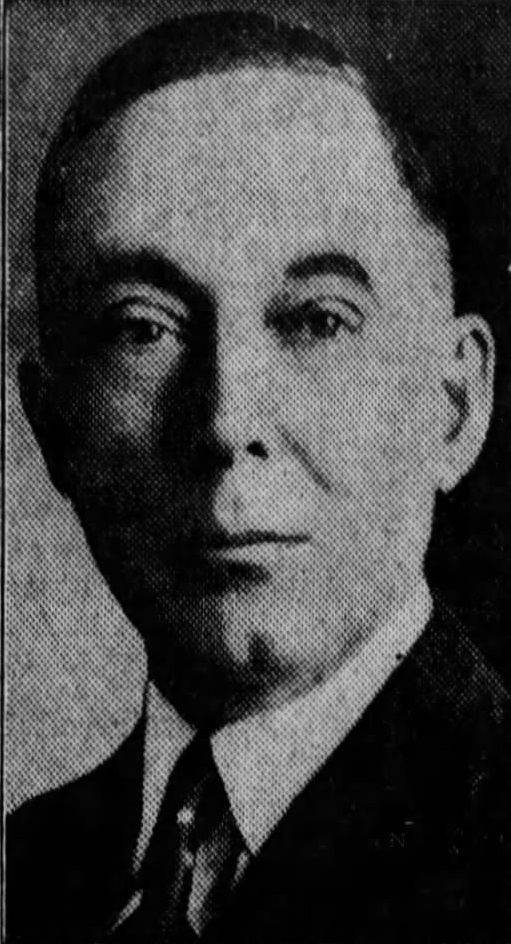
Nominee	Owen Brewster	Louis Brann
Party	Republican	Democratic
Popular vote	150,149	105,740
Percentage	58.61%	41.27%
- County results Brewster: 50–60% 60–70% 70–80% Brann: 50–60% 60–70%
U.S. senator before election
Frederick Hale
Republican
Elected U.S. Senator
Owen Brewster
Republican

1940 United States Senate election in Maine
Party	Candidate	Votes	%
Republican	Ralph Owen Brewster	150,149	58.61
Democratic	Louis J. Brann	105,740	41.27
Independent	Lewis Gordon	305	0.12
Majority		44,409	17.34
Turnout		256,194	
Republican hold			

== Maryland ==
1940 United States Senate election in Maryland
- November 5, 1940
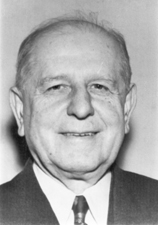

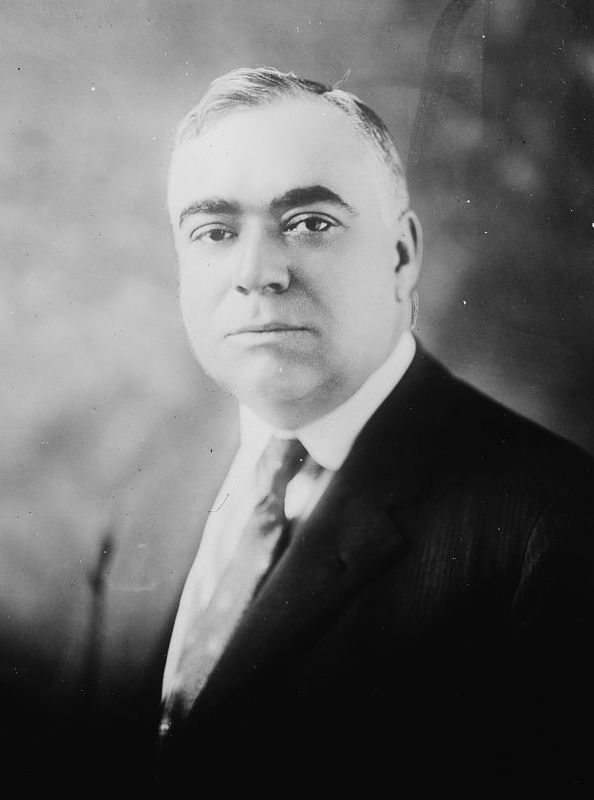
Nominee	George L. P. Radcliffe	Harry Nice
Party	Democratic	Republican
Popular vote	394,239	203,912
Percentage	64.74%	33.48%
- County results Nice: 40–50% 50–60% Radcliffe: 40–50% 50–60% 60–70%
U.S. senator before election
George L. P. Radcliffe
Democratic
Elected U.S. Senator
George L. P. Radcliffe
Democratic

1940 United States Senate election in Maryland
Party	Candidate	Votes	%
Democratic	George L. P. Radcliffe (Incumbent)	394,239	64.74
Republican	Harry W. Nice	203,912	33.48
Socialist	Edwin B. Abbott	4,204	0.69
Independent	David L. Elliott	3,423	0.56
American Labor	Robert Kadish	1,848	0.30
Communist	Albert E. Blumberg	1,349	0.22
Majority		190,327	31.26
Turnout		608,975	
Democratic hold			

== Massachusetts ==
1940 United States Senate election in Massachusetts
- November 5, 1940
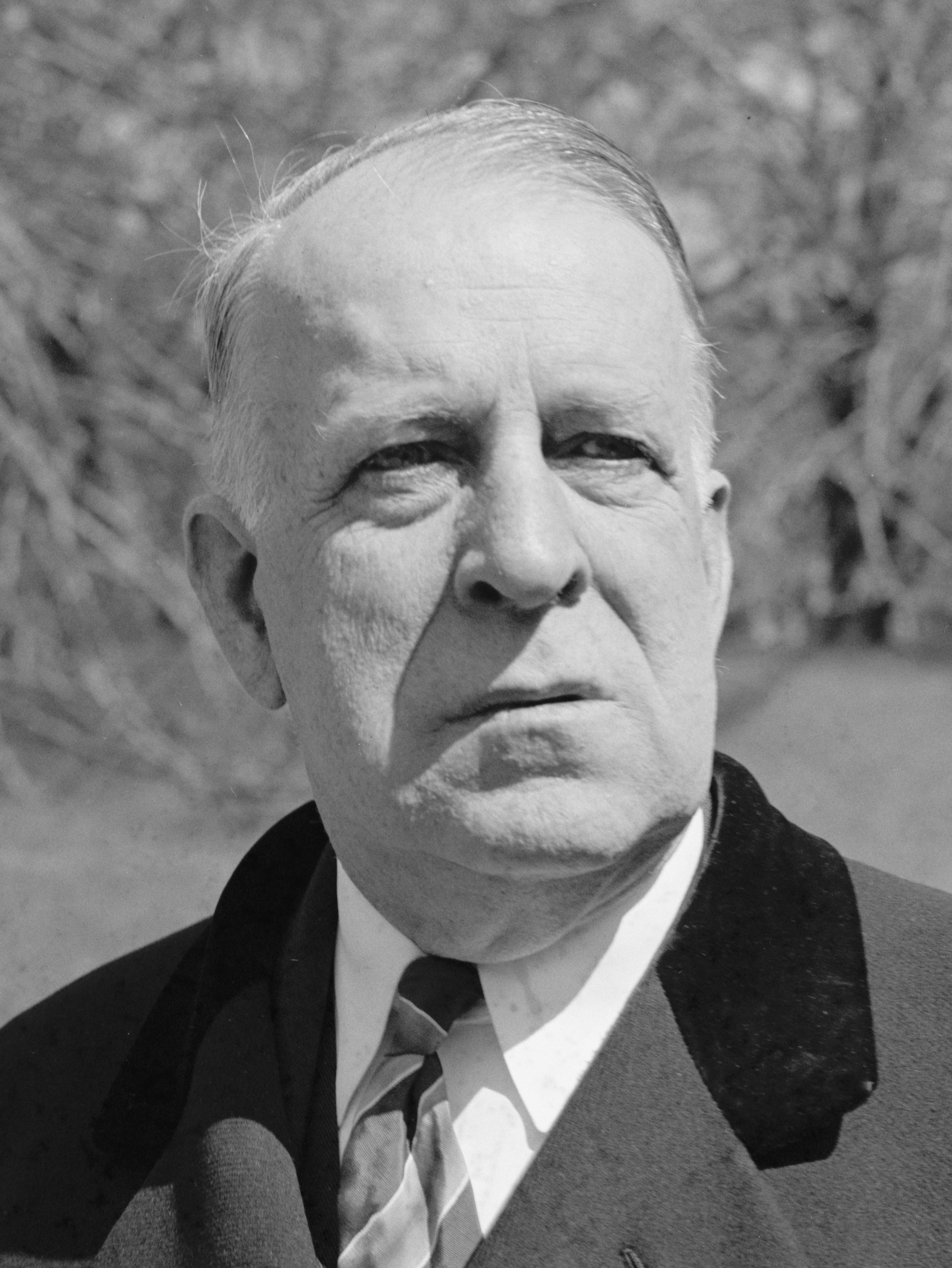

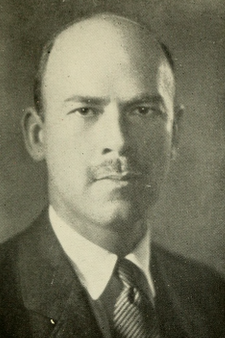
Nominee	David I. Walsh	Henry Parkman Jr.
Party	Democratic	Republican
Popular vote	1,088,838	838,122
Percentage	55.64%	42.38%
- Walsh: 40–50% 50–60% 60–70% 70–80% Parkman: 40–50% 50–60% 60–70% 70–80% 80–90%
Senator before election
David I. Walsh
Democratic
Elected Senator
David I. Walsh
Democratic

1940 United States Senate election in Massachusetts
Party	Candidate	Votes	%
Democratic	David I. Walsh (Incumbent)	1,088,838	55.64
Republican	Henry Parkman Jr.	838,122	42.38
Prohibition	George L. Thompson	9,632	0.49
Communist	Philip Frankfeld	9,465	0.48
Socialist	Lyman Paine	6,876	0.35
Socialist Labor	Horace I. Hillis	4,133	0.21
Majority		250,716	12.82
Turnout		1,957,089	
Democratic hold			

== Michigan ==
1940 United States Senate election in Michigan
- November 5, 1940
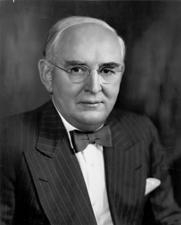

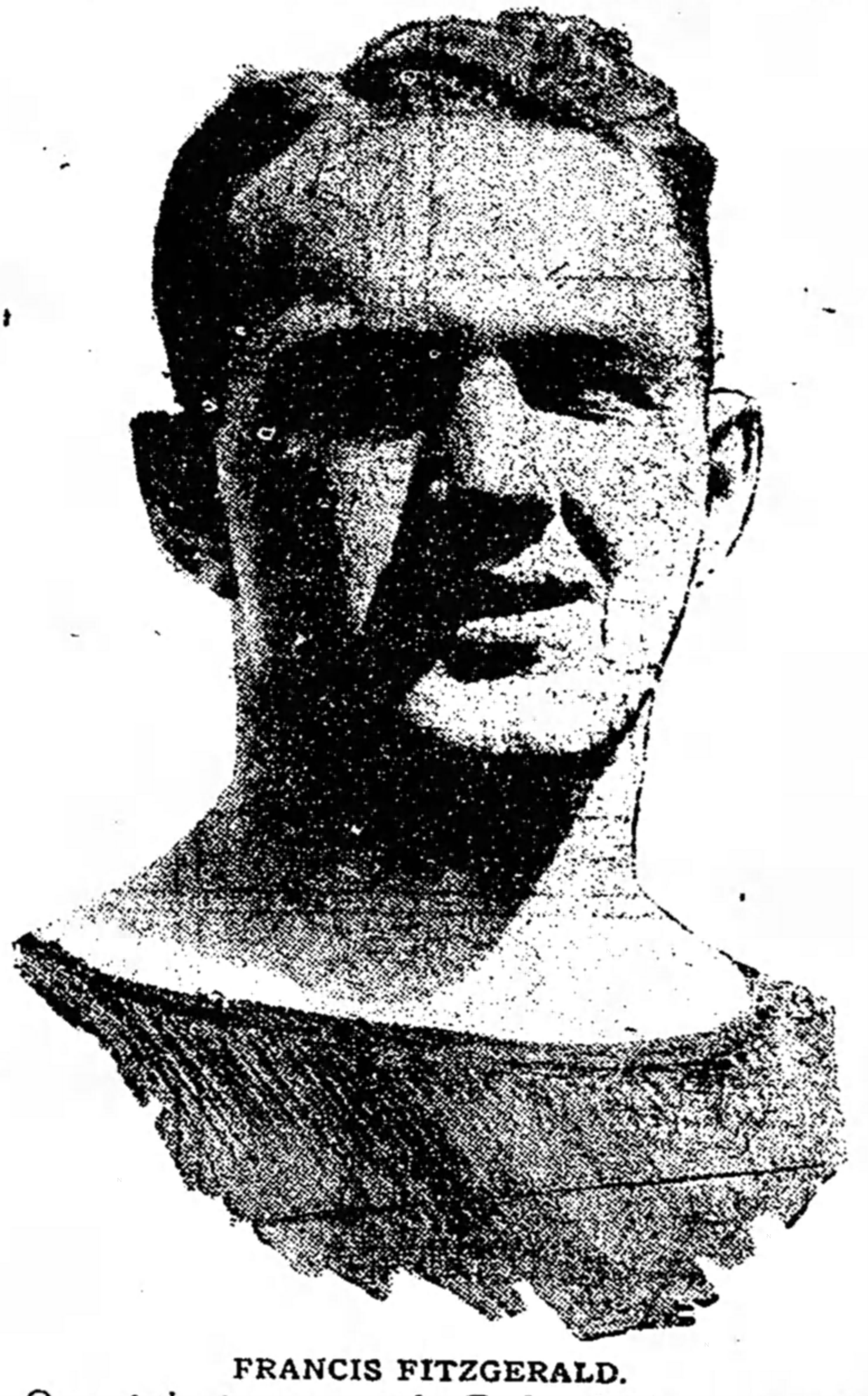
Nominee	Arthur Vandenberg	Frank FitzGerald
Party	Republican	Democratic
Popular vote	1,053,104	939,740
Percentage	52.65%	46.98%
- County results Vandenberg: 40–50% 50–60% 60–70% 70–80% 80–90% FitzGerald: 50–60% 60–70%
U.S. senator before election
Arthur Vandenberg
Republican
Elected U.S. Senator
Arthur Vandenberg
Republican

1940 United States Senate election in Michigan
Party	Candidate	Votes	%
Republican	Arthur Vandenberg (Incumbent)	1,053,104	52.65
Democratic	Frank FitzGerald	939,740	46.98
Socialist	Nahum Burnett	3,580	0.18
Communist	Elmer Johnson	2,290	0.11
Prohibition	Carroll P. Pahman	937	0.05
Socialist Labor	Theos A. Grove	691	0.03
Majority		113,364	5.67
Turnout		2,000,342	
Republican hold			

== Minnesota ==
1940 United States Senate election in Minnesota
- November 5, 1940
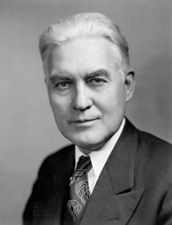

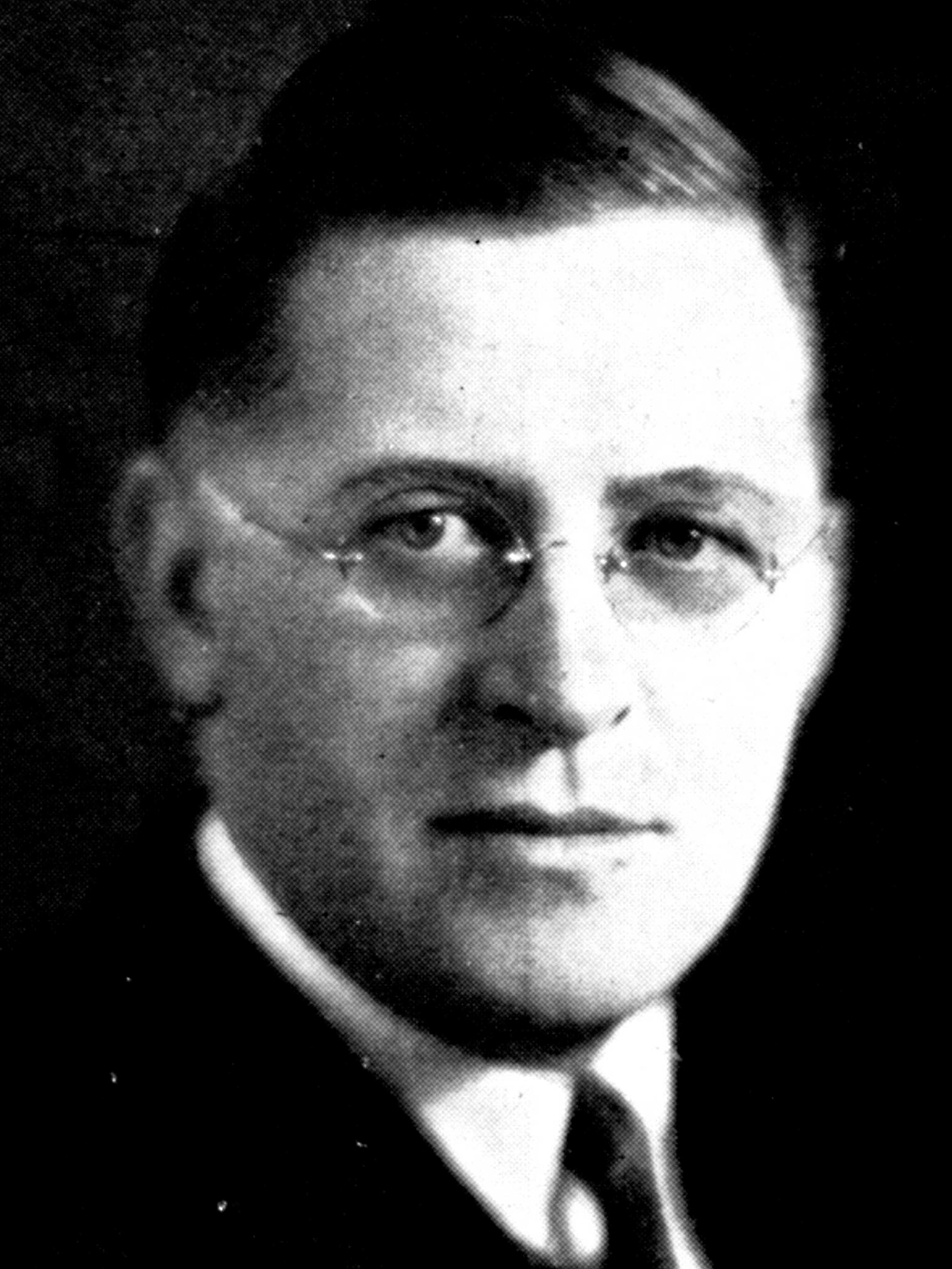

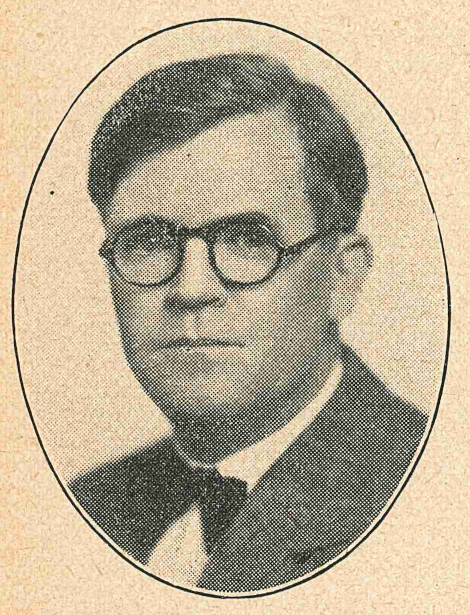
Nominee	Henrik Shipstead	Elmer A. Benson	John E. Regan
Party	Republican	Farmer–Labor	Democratic
Popular vote	641,049	310,875	248,658
Percentage	53.01%	25.71%	20.56%
- County results Shipstead: 30–40% 40–50% 50–60% 60–70% 70–80% Benson: 40–50%
U.S. senator before election
Henrik Shipstead
Farmer–Labor
Elected U.S. Senator
Henrik Shipstead
Republican

1940 United States Senate election in Minnesota
Party	Candidate	Votes	%
Republican	Henrik Shipstead (Incumbent)	641,049	53.00
Farmer–Labor	Elmer Austin Benson	310,875	25.70
Democratic	John E. Regan	248,658	20.56
Trotskyist Anti-War	Grace Holmes Carlson	8,761	0.72
Independent	Carl Winter	256	0.02
Majority		330,174	27.30
Turnout		1,209,599	
Republican gain from Farmer–Labor			

== Mississippi ==
1940 Democratic Senate primary election in Mississippi
- August 27, 1940
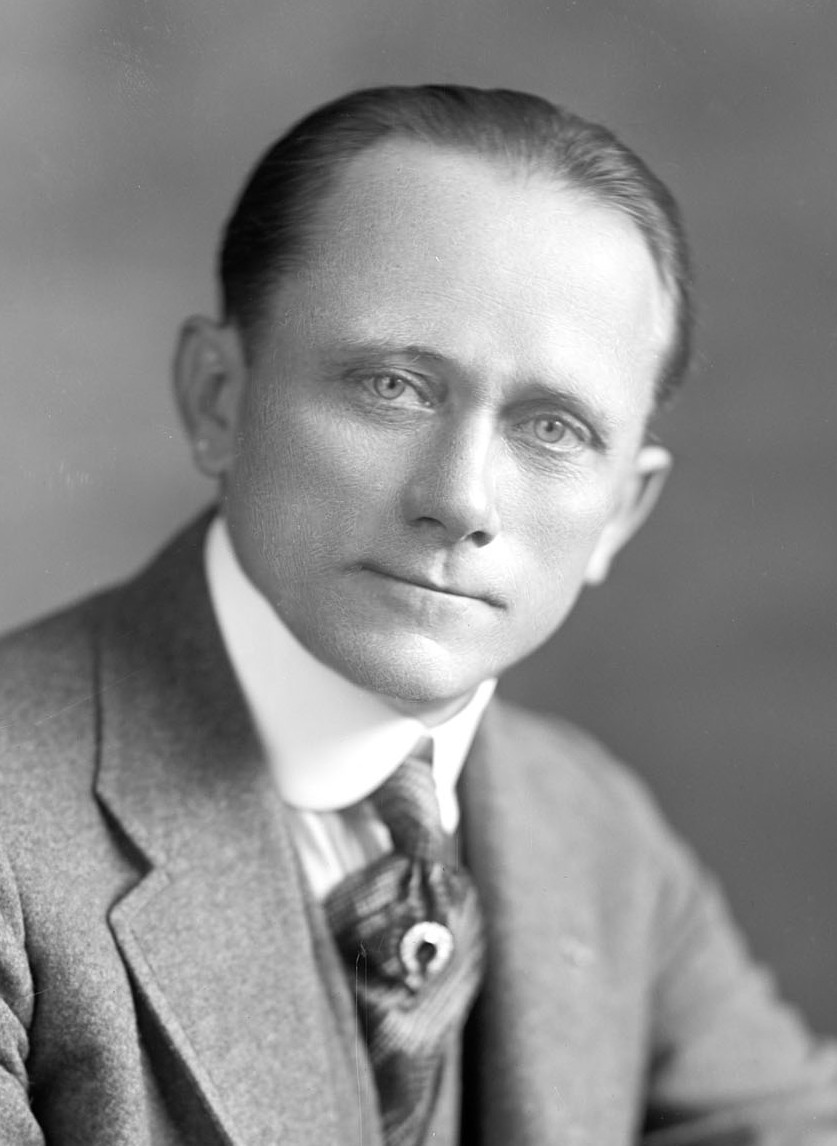

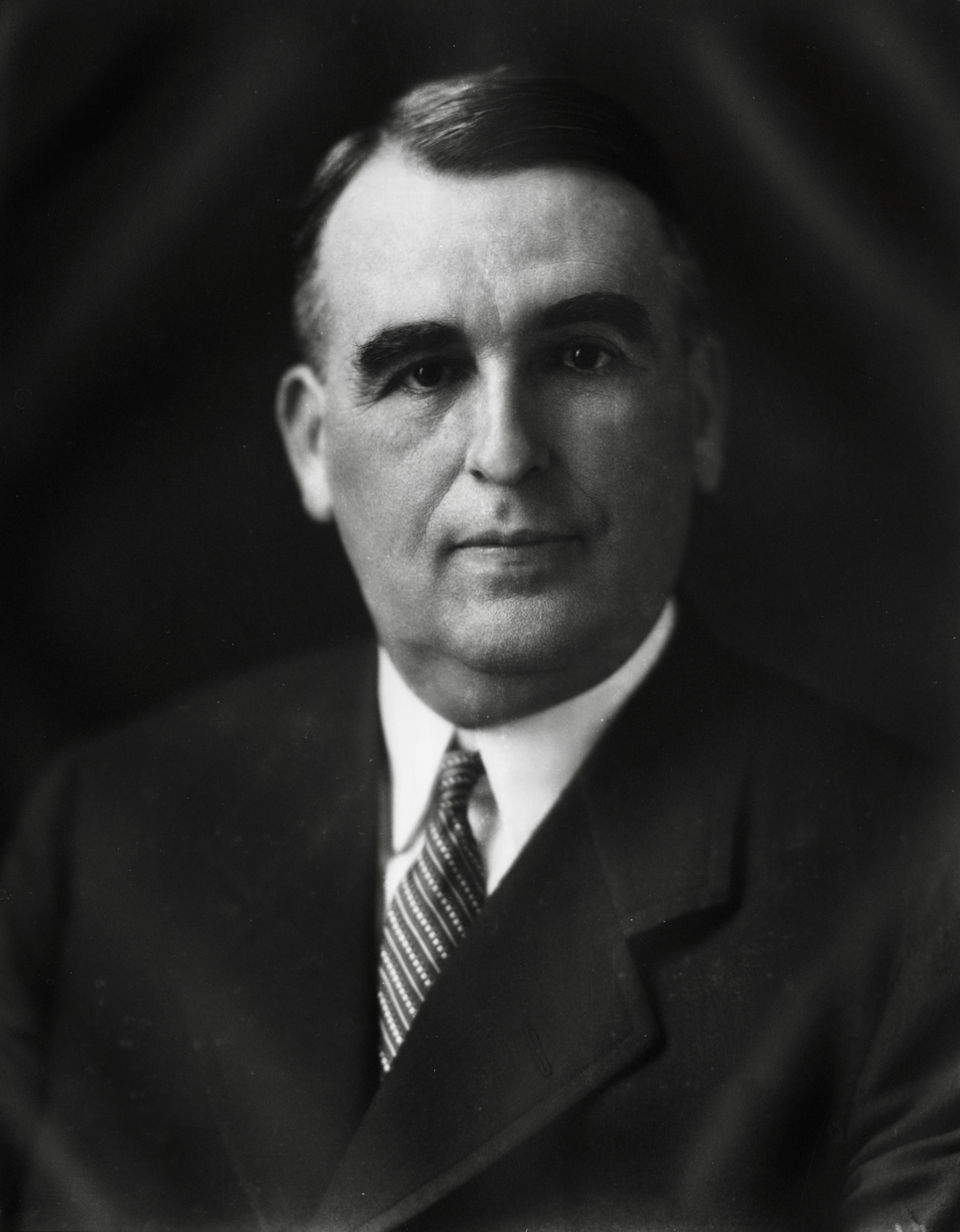
Nominee	Theodore Bilbo	Hugh White
Party	Democratic	Democratic
Popular vote	91,334	62,641
Percentage	59.32%	40.68%
- County results Bilbo: 50–60% 60–70% 70–80% 80–90% White: 50–60% 60–70% 70–80% Tie: 50%
U.S. senator before election
Theodore Bilbo
Democratic
Elected U.S. Senator
Theodore Bilbo
Democratic

1940 United States Senate election in Mississippi
Party	Candidate	Votes	%
Democratic	Theodore G. Bilbo (Incumbent)	143,431	100.00
Democratic hold			

== Missouri ==
1940 United States Senate election in Missouri
- November 5, 1940
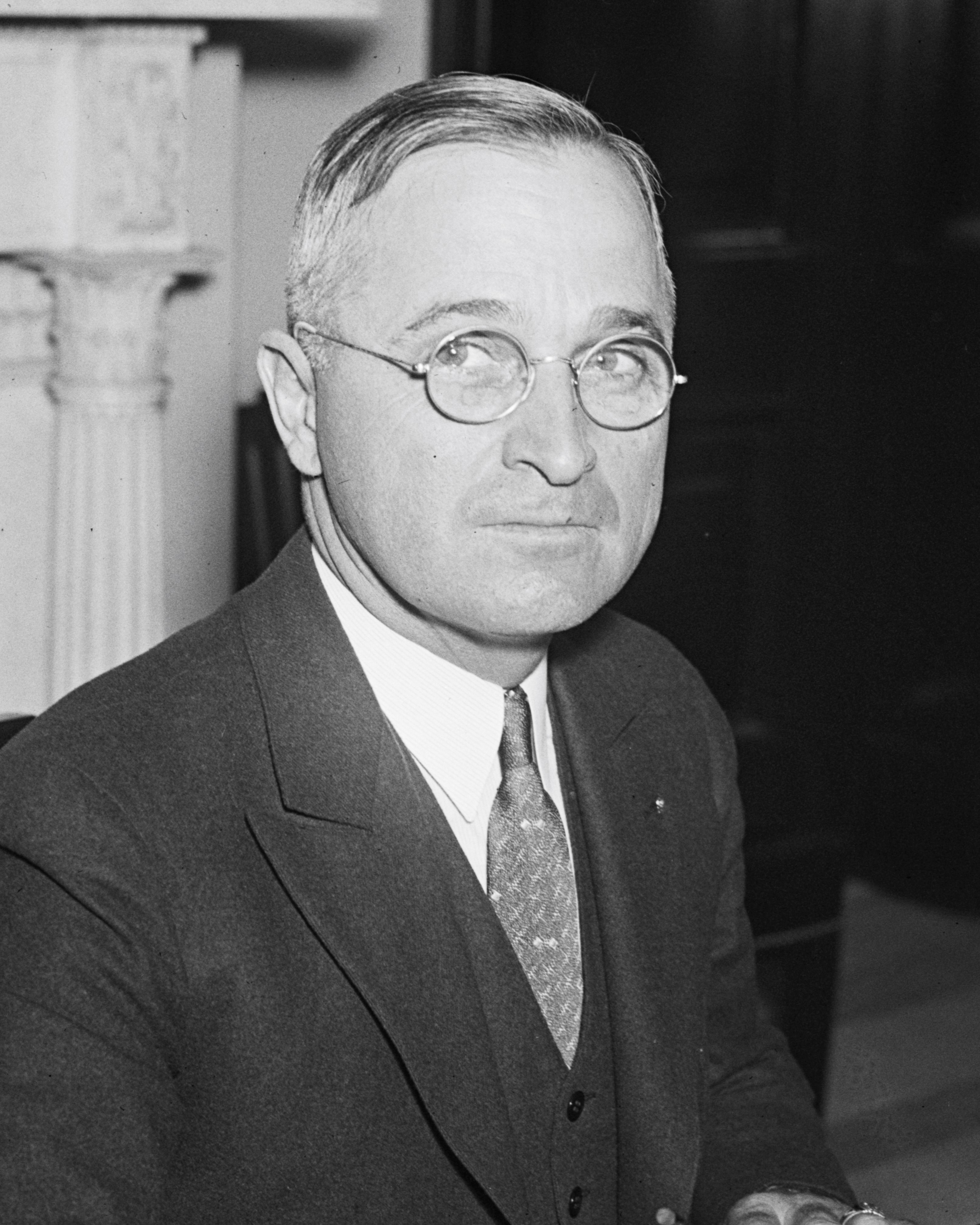

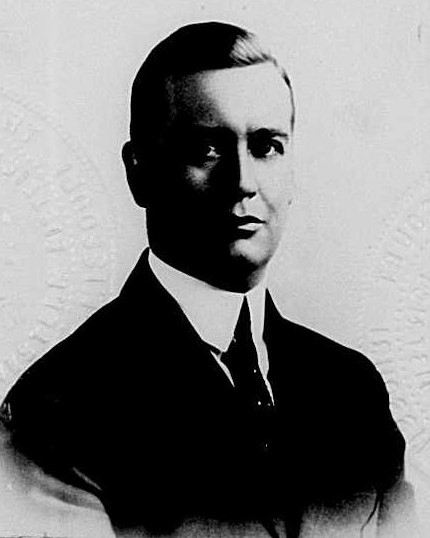
Nominee	Harry S. Truman	Manvel H. Davis
Party	Democratic	Republican
Popular vote	930,775	886,376
Percentage	51.17%	48.73%
- County results Truman: 50–60% 60–70% 70–80% 80–90% Davis: 50–60% 60–70% 70–80% 80–90%
U.S. senator before election
Harry S. Truman
Democratic
Elected U.S. Senator
Harry S. Truman
Democratic

One-term Democrat Harry S. Truman was narrowly re-elected. He would only serve until resigning January 17, 1945, to become U.S. Vice President.

1940 Missouri United States Senate election
Party	Candidate	Votes	%
Democratic	Harry S. Truman (Incumbent)	930,775	51.17
Republican	Manvel H. Davis	886,376	48.73
Socialist	W.F. Rinck	1,669	0.09
Socialist Labor	Theodore Baeff	196	0.01
Majority		44,499	2.44
Turnout		1,819,016	
Democratic hold			

== Montana ==
1940 United States Senate election in Montana
- November 5, 1940
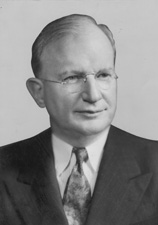

Nominee	Burton K. Wheeler	E. K. Cheadle
Party	Democratic	Republican
Popular vote	176,753	63,941
Percentage	73.43%	26.57%
- County results Wheeler: 50–60% 60–70% 70–80% 80–90% 90–100%
U.S. senator before election
Burton K. Wheeler
Democratic
Elected U.S. Senator
Burton K. Wheeler
Democratic

1940 United States Senate election in Montana
Party	Candidate	Votes	%	±%
Democratic	Burton K. Wheeler (Incumbent)	176,753	73.43	+3.29%
Republican	E. K. Cheadle	63,941	26.57	−2.17%
Majority		112,812	46.87	+5.47%
Turnout		240,694		
Democratic hold		Swing		

== Nebraska ==
1940 United States Senate election in Nebraska
- November 5, 1940
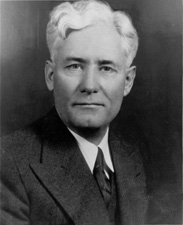

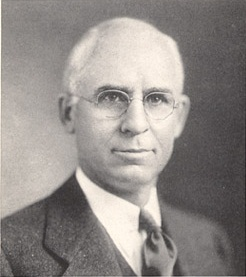
Nominee	Hugh A. Butler	Robert Leroy Cochran
Party	Republican	Democratic
Popular vote	340,250	247,659
Percentage	57.00%	41.49%
- County results Butler: 40–50% 50–60% 60–70% 70–80% Cochran: 40–50% 50–60%
U.S. senator before election
Edward R. Burke
Democratic
Elected U.S. Senator
Hugh A. Butler
Republican

1940 United States Senate election in Nebraska
Party	Candidate	Votes	%
Republican	Hugh A. Butler	340,250	57.00
Democratic	Robert Leroy Cochran	247,659	41.49
None	Albert F. Ruthven	8,982	1.50
Majority		92,591	15.51
Turnout		596,891	
Republican gain from Democratic			

== Nevada ==
1940 United States Senate election in Nevada
- November 5, 1940
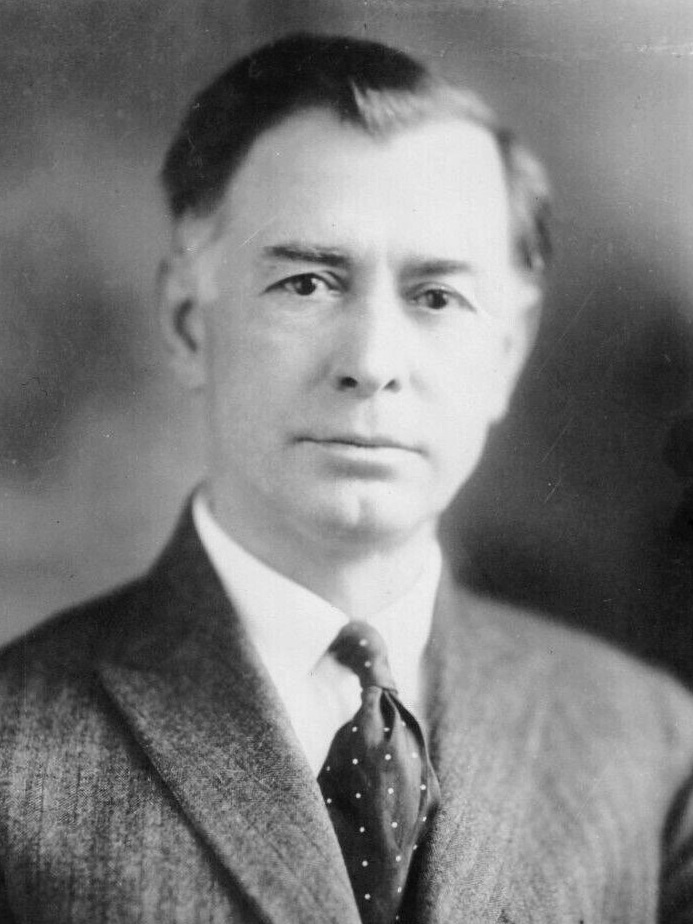

Nominee	Key Pittman	Samuel Platt
Party	Democratic	Republican
Popular vote	31,351	20,488
Percentage	60.48%	39.52%
- County results Pittman: 50–60% 60–70% 70–80% 80–90% Platt: 50–60%
U.S. senator before election
Key Pittman
Democratic
Elected U.S. Senator
Key Pittman
Democratic

Pittman suffered a severe heart attack just before the election on November 5, and two doctors told his aides before the election that death was imminent. To avoid affecting the election, the party told the press that the senator was hospitalized for exhaustion and that his condition was not serious. Pittman died on November 10 at the Washoe General Hospital in Reno, Nevada. Governor Edward Carville would go on to appoint Berkeley L. Bunker as his replacement.

In later years, a myth spread that Pittman had in fact died before the election, and his body had been kept on ice in the Mizpah Hotel in Tonopah so that Carville could appoint his replacement.

1940 United States Senate election in Nevada
Party	Candidate	Votes	%
Democratic	Key Pittman (Incumbent)	31,351	60.48
Republican	Samuel Platt	20,488	39.52
Majority		10,863	20.96
Turnout		51,839	
Democratic hold			

== New Jersey ==
New Jersey election
- November 5, 1940
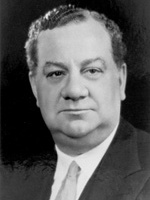

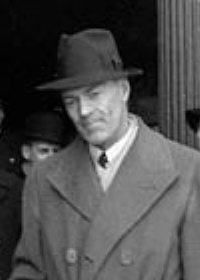
Nominee	W. Warren Barbour	James H. R. Cromwell
Party	Republican	Democratic
Popular vote	1,029,331	823,893
Percentage	55.11%	44.11%
- County results Barbour: 50–60% 60–70% Cromwell: 50–60%
Senator before election
W. Warren Barbour
Republican
Elected Senator
W. Warren Barbour
Republican

1940 United States Senate election in New Jersey
Party	Candidate	Votes	%
Republican	W. Warren Barbour (Incumbent)	1,029,331	55.11
Democratic	James H. R. Cromwell	823,893	44.11
Socialist	McAlister Coleman	8,836	0.47
Independent	James A. Tumulty Jr.	2,784	0.15
Communist	Mary Ellen Dooner	1,519	0.08
Prohibition	Edson R. Leach	645	0.03
Socialist Labor	Harry Santhouse	464	0.02
Socialist Workers	George Breitman	303	0.02
Majority		225,438	11.00
Turnout		1,867,775	
Republican hold			

== New Mexico ==
1940 United States Senate election in New Mexico
- November 5, 1940
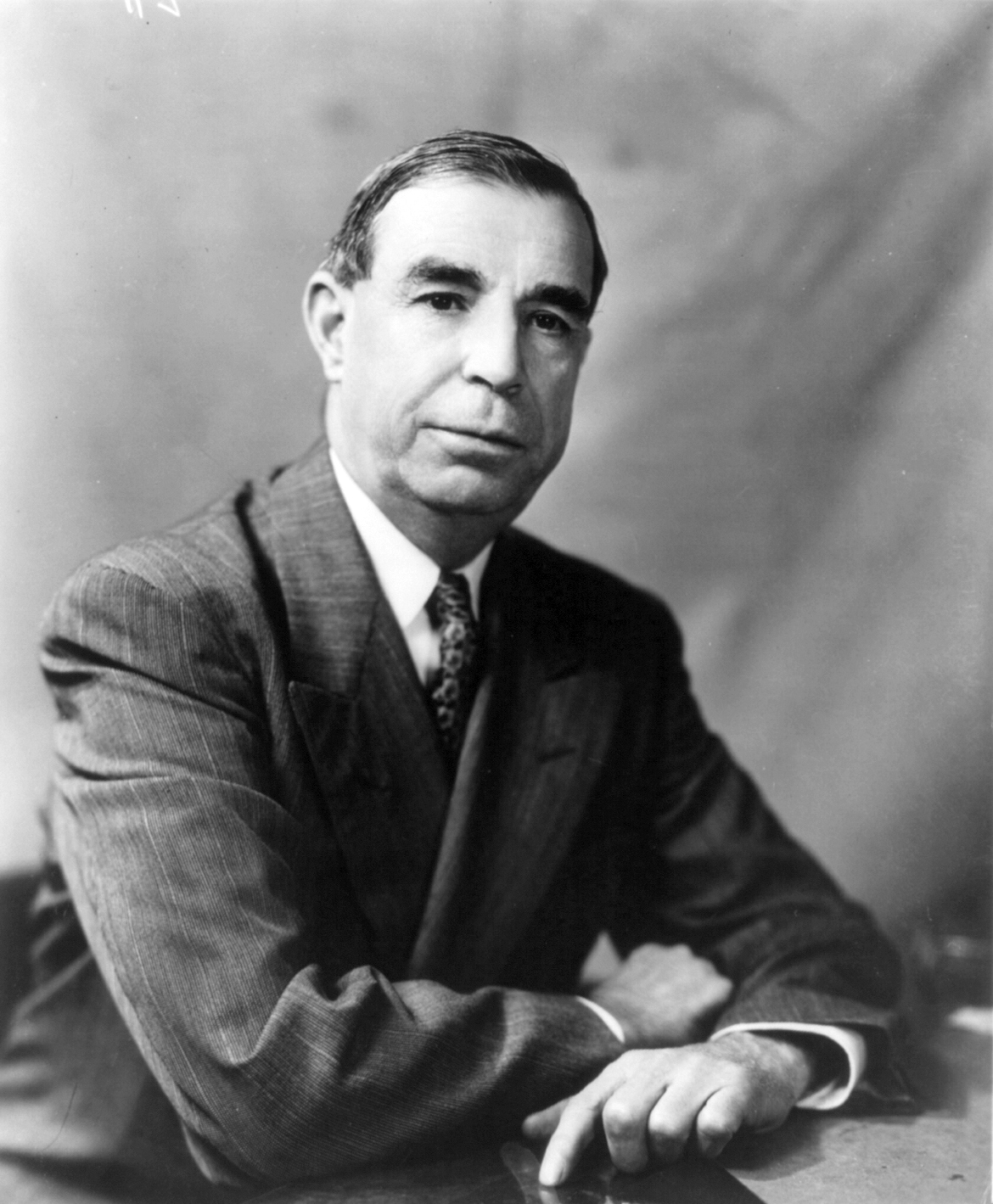

Nominee	Dennis Chavez	Albert K. Mitchell
Party	Democratic	Republican
Popular vote	103,194	81,257
Percentage	55.95%	44.05%
- County results Chevez: 50–60% 60–70% 70–80% Mitchell: 50–60%
U.S. senator before election
Dennis Chavez
Democratic
Elected U.S. Senator
Dennis Chavez
Democratic

1940 United States Senate election in New Mexico
Party	Candidate	Votes	%
Democratic	Dennis Chávez (Incumbent)	103,194	55.95
Republican	Albert K. Mitchell	81,257	44.05
Majority		21,937	11.90
Turnout		184,451	
Democratic hold			

== New York ==
1940 United States Senate election in New York
- November 5, 1940
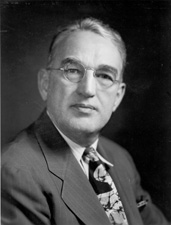

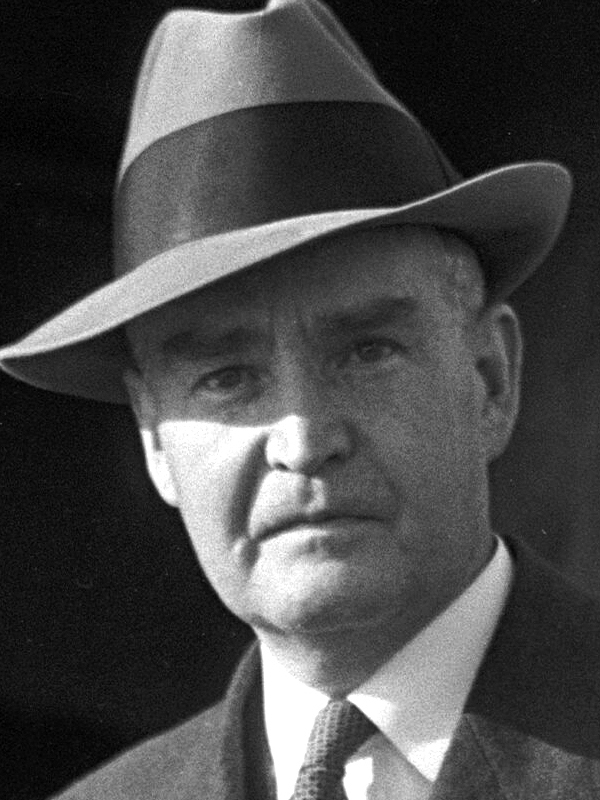
Nominee	James M. Mead	Bruce Barton
Party	Democratic	Republican
Alliance	American Labor
Popular vote	3,274,766	2,868,852
Percentage	53.26%	46.66%
- County results Mead: 50–60% 60–70% Barton: 50–60% 60–70% 70–80%
U.S. senator before election
James M. Mead
Democratic
Elected U.S. Senator
James M. Mead
Democratic

The whole ticket nominated by Democrats and American Laborites was elected.

1940 United States Senate election in New York
Party	Candidate	Votes	%
Democratic	James M. Mead	2,893,407	47.06
American Labor	James M. Mead	381,359	6.20
Total	James M. Mead (Incumbent)	3,274,766	53.26
Republican	Bruce Barton	2,842,942	46.66
Prohibition	Stephen W. Paine	4,944	0.08
Total votes		6,148,562	100.00
Democratic hold			

== North Dakota ==
1940 United States Senate election in North Dakota
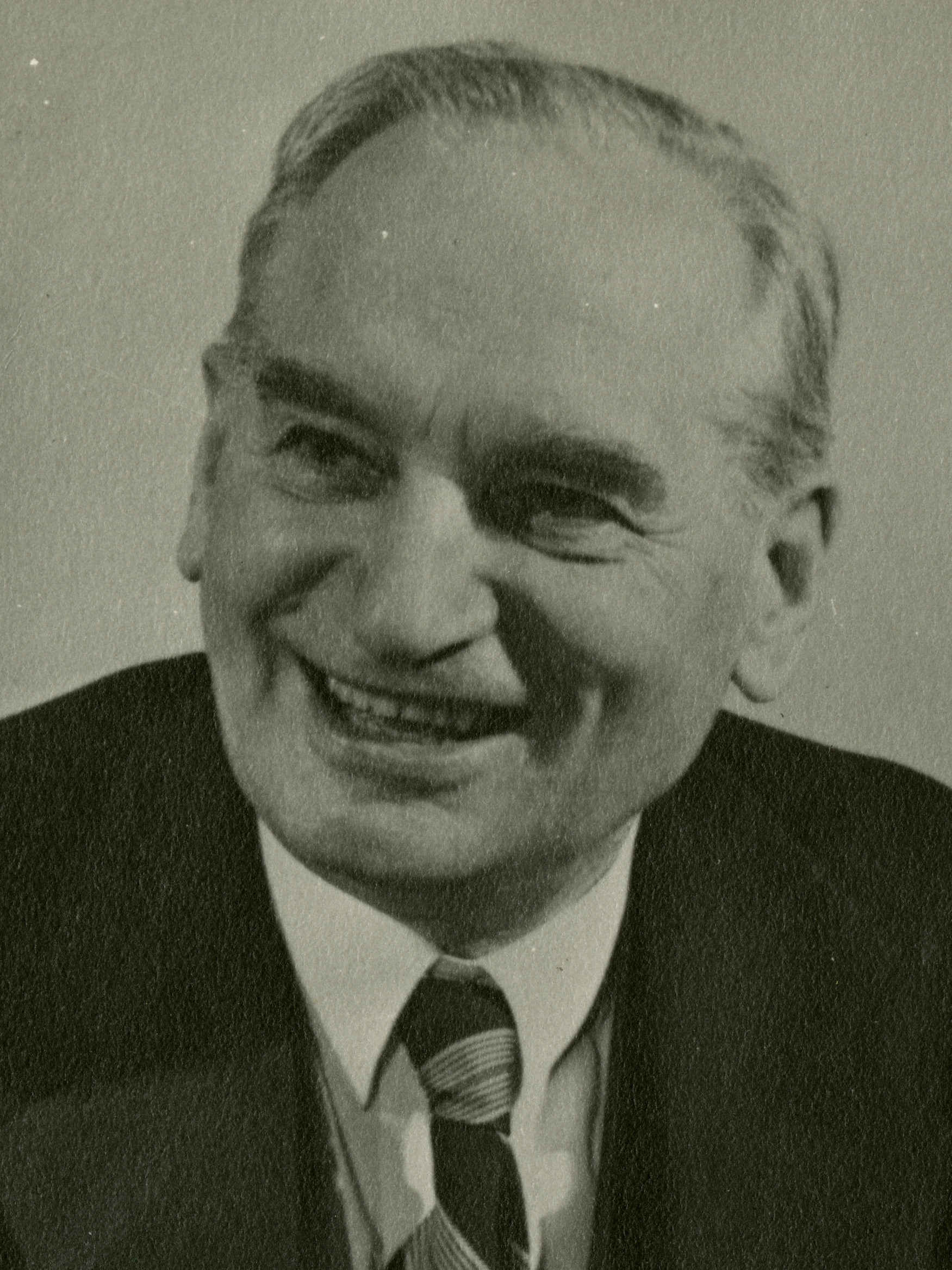

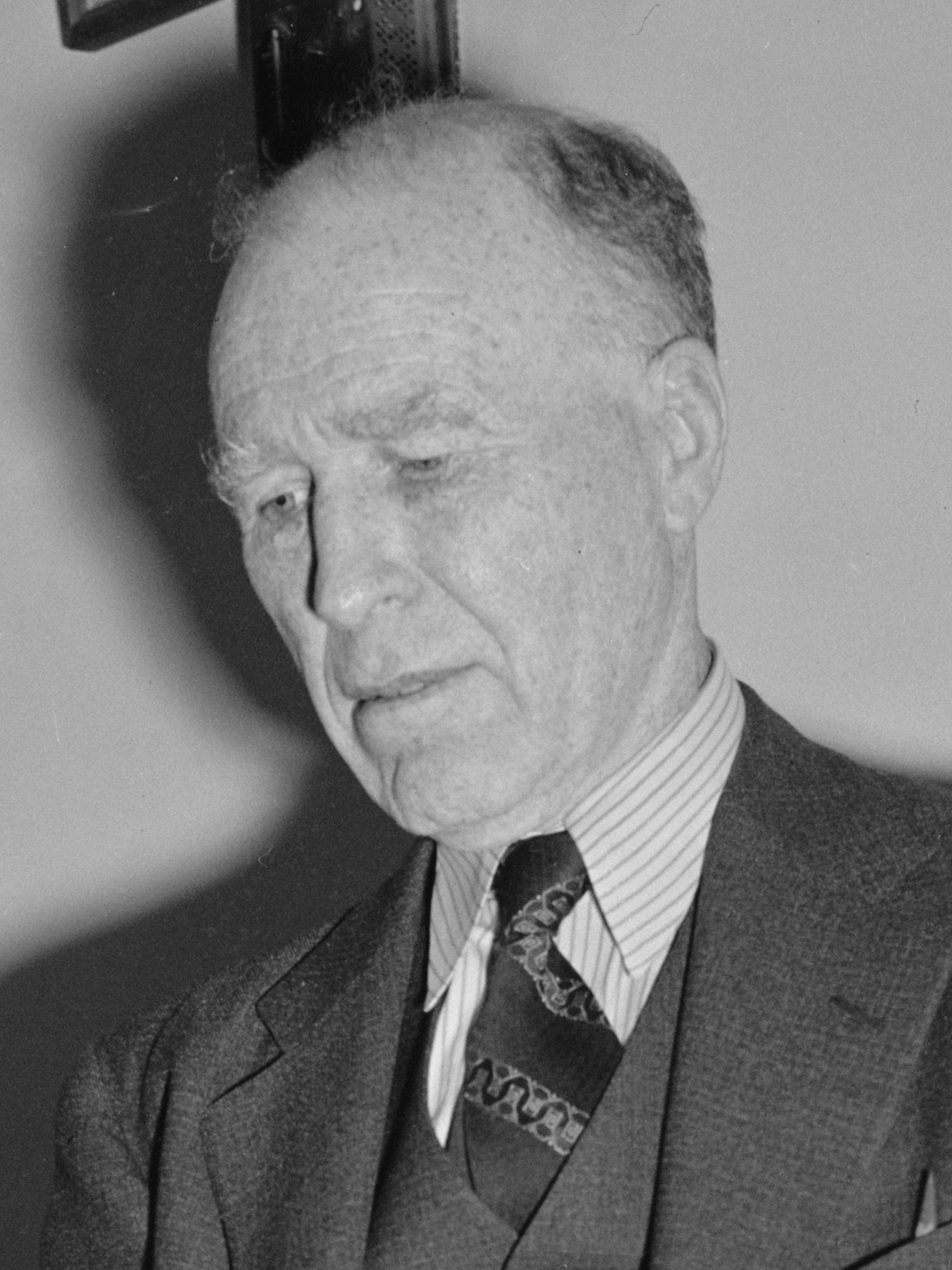

Nominee	William Langer	William Lemke	Charles J. Vogel
Party	Republican	Independent	Democratic
Popular vote	100,647	92,593	69,847
Percentage	38.11%	35.06%	26.45%
- County results Langer: 30–40% 40–50% 50–60% 60–70% Lemke: 30–40% 40–50% 50-–% Vogel: 30–40% 40–50%
U.S. senator before election
Gerald Nye
Republican
Elected U.S. Senator
Gerald Nye
Republican

1940 United States Senate election in North Dakota
Party	Candidate	Votes	%	±%
Republican	William Langer	100,647	38.11%	−20.13%
Independent	William Lemke	92,593	35.06%	—
Democratic	Charles J. Vogel	69,847	26.45%	−13.80%
Independent	Jasper Haaland	1,1014	0.38%	—
Majority		8,054	3.05%	−14.95%
Turnout		259,607		
Republican hold				

== Ohio ==
1940 United States Senate election in Ohio
- November 5, 1940
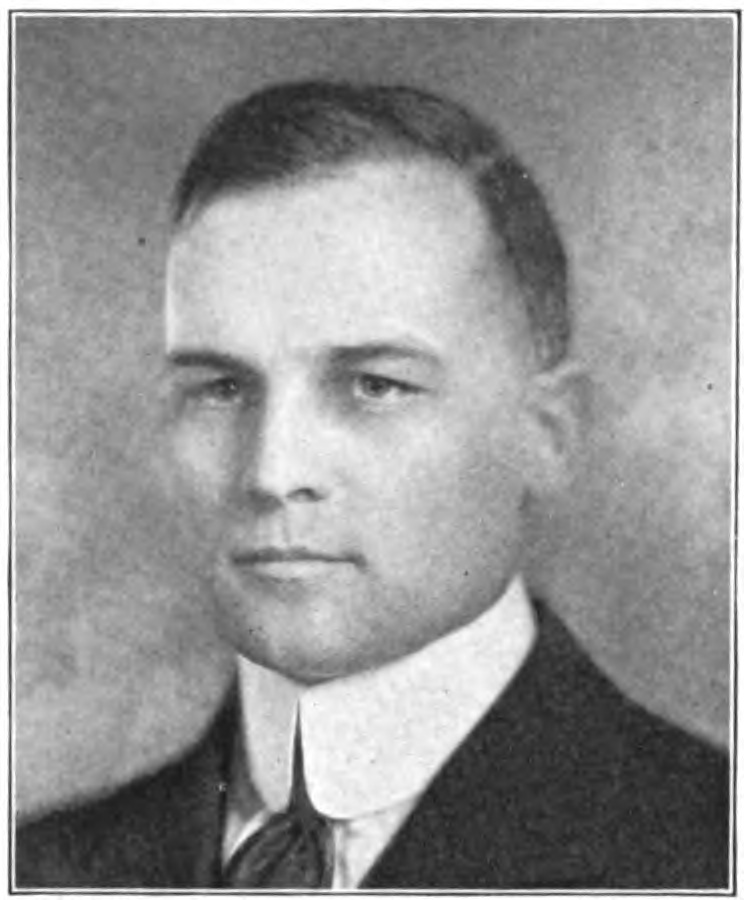

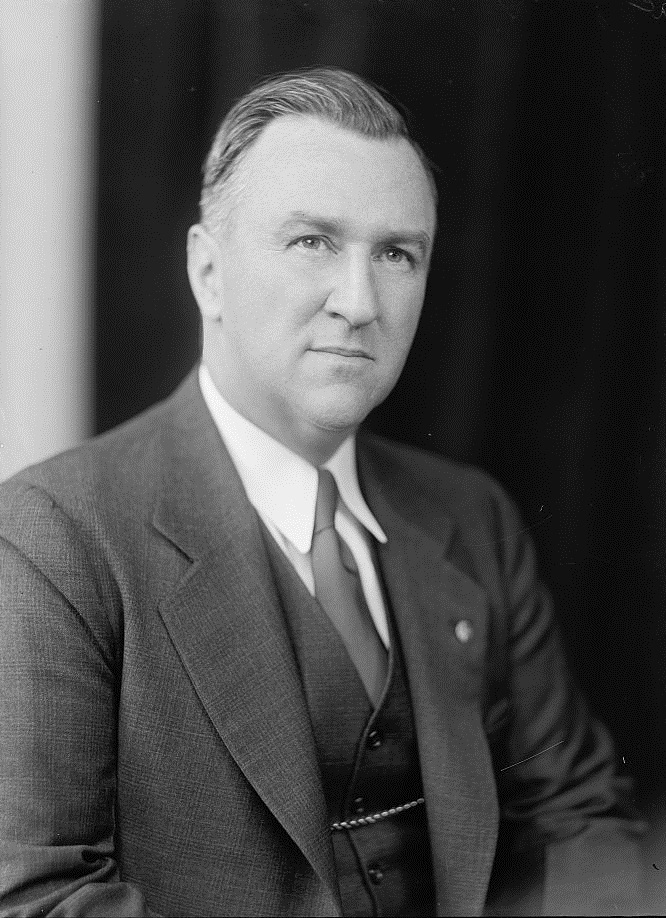
Nominee	Harold Burton	John McSweeney
Party	Republican	Democratic
Popular vote	1,602,498	1,457,304
Percentage	52.37%	47.63%
U.S. senator before election
Vic Donahey
Democratic
Elected U.S. Senator
Harold Hitz Burton
Republican

1940 United States Senate election in Ohio
Party	Candidate	Votes	%
Republican	Harold H. Burton	1,602,498	52.37
Democratic	John McSweeney	1,457,304	47.63
Majority		145,194	4.74
Turnout		3,059,802	
Republican gain from Democratic			

== Pennsylvania ==
1940 United States Senate election in Pennsylvania
- November 5, 1940
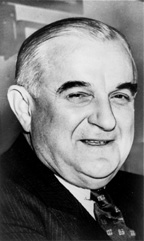

Nominee	Joseph F. Guffey	Jay Cooke
Party	Democratic	Republican
Popular vote	2,069,980	1,893,104
Percentage	51.79%	47.36%
- County results Guffey: 50–60% 60–70% Cooke: 40–50% 50–60% 60–70% 70–80%
U.S. senator before election
Joseph F. Guffey
Democratic
Elected U.S. Senator
Joseph F. Guffey
Democratic

General election results
Party	Candidate	Votes	%	±%
Democratic	Joseph F. Guffey (Incumbent)	2,069,980	51.79	+1.01%
Republican	Jay Cooke	1,893,104	47.36	−0.90%
Socialist	David H.H. Felix	15,449	0.39	0.00%
Prohibition	H. B. Mansell	11,113	0.28	−0.40%
Communist	Carl Reeve	4,761	0.12	−0.09%
Socialist Labor	Frank Knotek	2,503	0.06	−0.10%
N/A	Other	110	0.00	N/A
Majority		176,876	4.43	
Turnout		3,997,020		
Democratic hold		Swing		

== Rhode Island ==
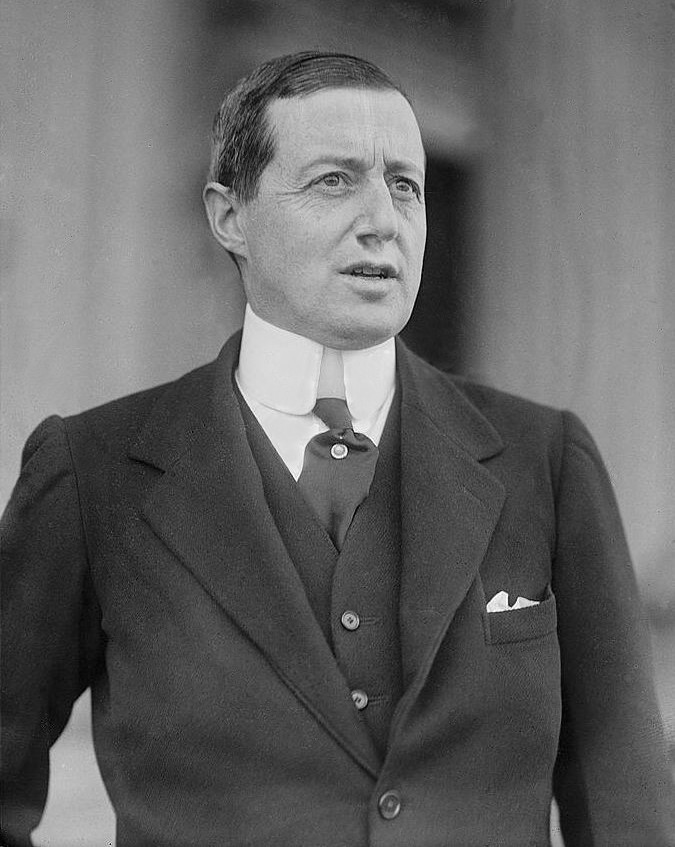
Senator Peter G. Gerry

1940 United States Senate election in Rhode Island
Party	Candidate	Votes	%
Democratic	Peter G. Gerry (Incumbent)	173,927	55.16
Republican	James O. McManus	141,401	44.84
Majority		32,526	10.32
Turnout		315,328	
Democratic hold			

== Tennessee ==
1940 United States Senate election in Tennessee
- November 5, 1940
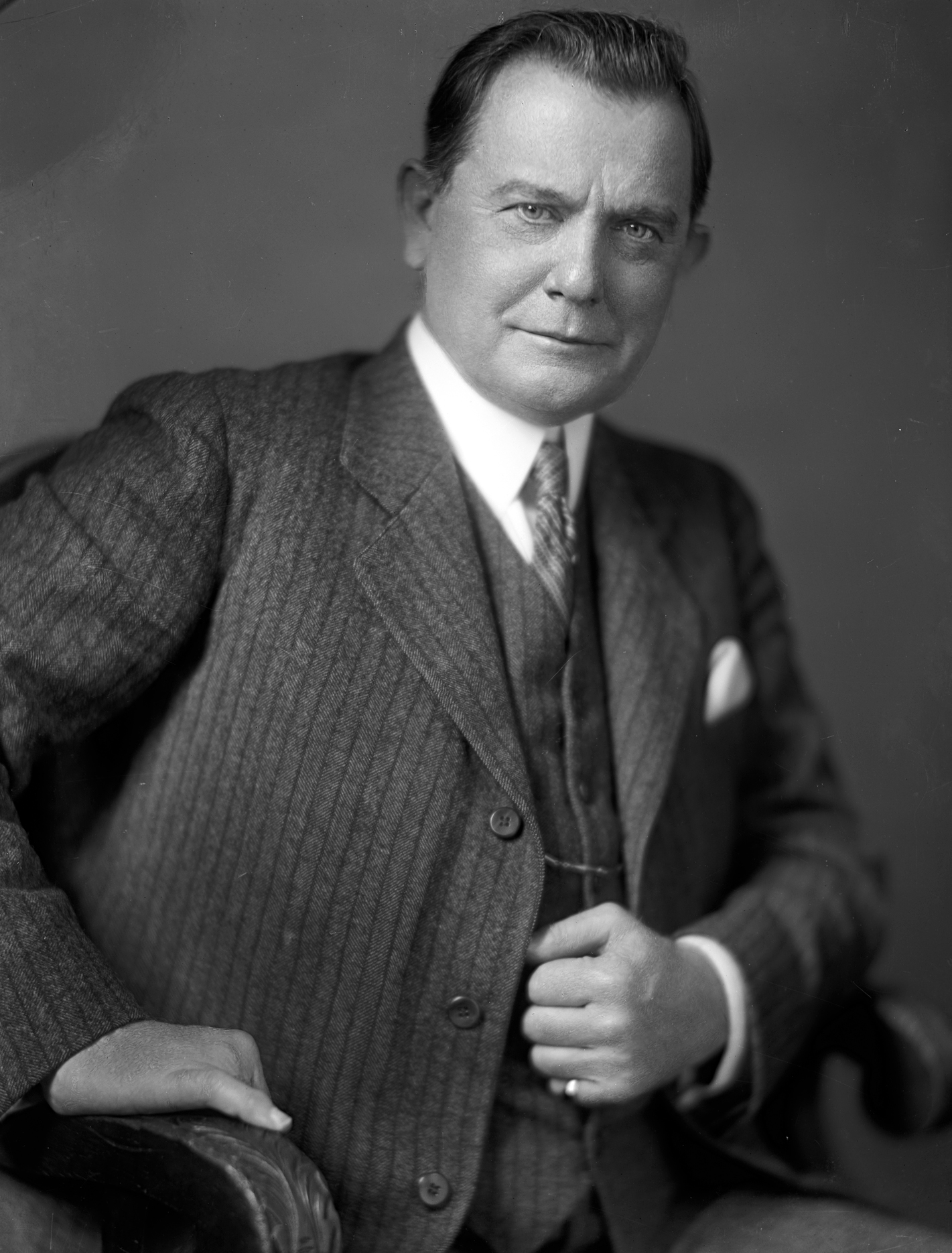

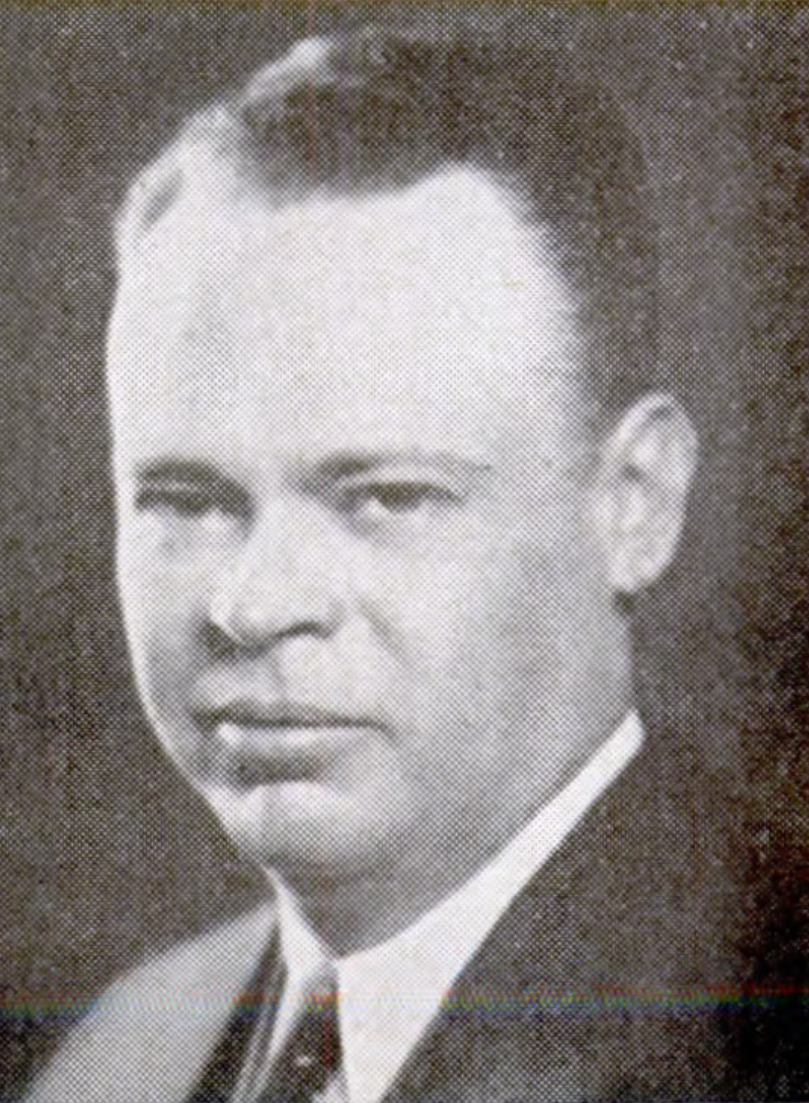
Nominee	Kenneth McKellar	Howard Baker Sr.
Party	Democratic	Republican
Popular vote	295,440	121,790
Percentage	70.80%	29.19%
- County results McKellar: 50–60% 60–70% 70–80% 80–90% >90% Baker: 50–60% 60–70% 70–80% 80–90%
U.S. senator before election
Kenneth McKellar
Democratic
Elected U.S. senator
Kenneth McKellar
Democratic

1940 United States Senate election in Tennessee
Party	Candidate	Votes	%
Democratic	Kenneth McKellar (Incumbent)	295,440	70.80
Republican	Howard Baker Sr.	121,790	29.19
Independent	John Randolph Neal Jr.	35.06	0.01
Majority		173,650	41.61
Turnout		417,265	
Democratic hold			

== Texas ==
1940 United States Senate election in Texas
- November 5, 1940
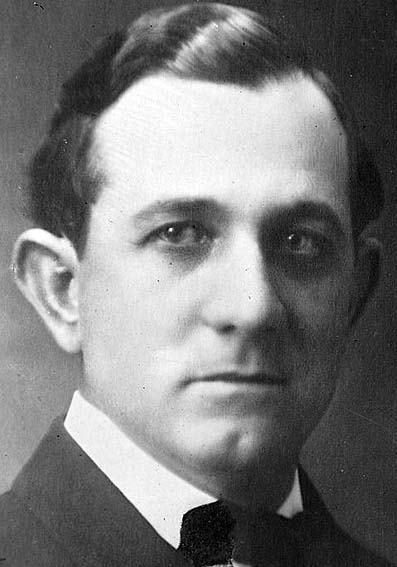

Nominee	Tom Connally	George Shannon
Party	Democratic	Republican
Popular vote	978,095	59,340
Percentage	94.24%	5.72%
- County results Connally: 50–60% 60–70% 70–80% 80–90% >90% No vote
U.S. senator before election
Tom Connally
Democratic
Elected U.S. Senator
Tom Connally
Democratic

1940 United States Senate election in Texas
Party	Candidate	Votes	%
Democratic	Tom Connally (Incumbent)	978,095	94.24
Republican	George I. Shannon	59,340	5.72
Communist	Homer Brooks	408	0.04
Majority		918,755	88.52
Turnout		1,037,843	
Democratic hold			

== Utah ==
1940 United States Senate election in Utah
- November 5, 1940
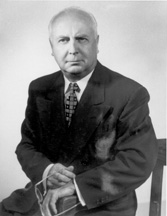

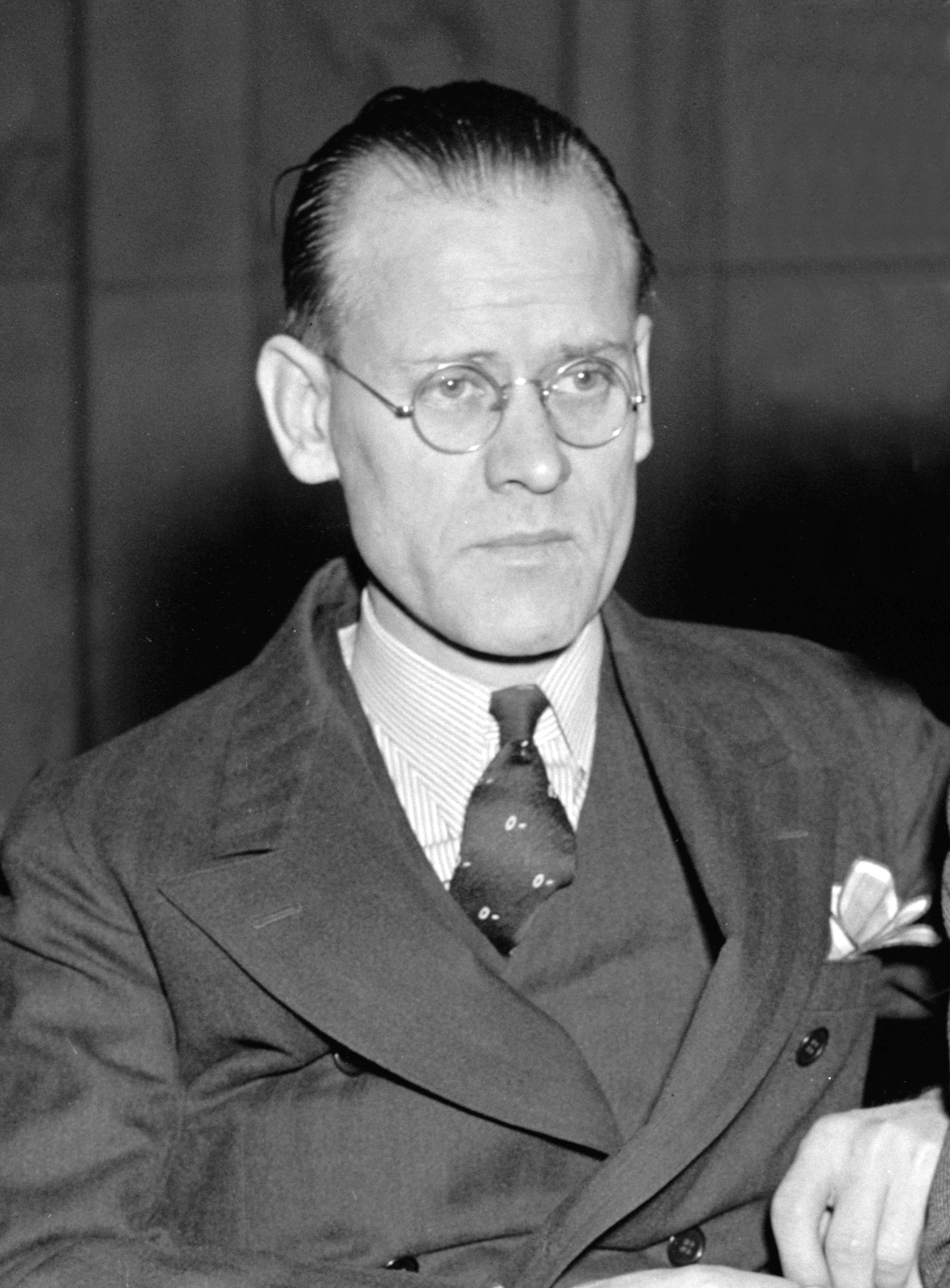
Nominee	Abe Murdock	Philo Farnsworth
Party	Democratic	Republican
Popular vote	155,499	91,931
Percentage	62.85%	37.15%
- County results Murdock: 50–60% 60–70% 70–80% Farnsworth: 50–60% 60–70%
U.S. senator before election
William H. King
Democratic
Elected U.S. Senator
Abe Murdock
Democratic

1940 United States Senate election in Utah
Party	Candidate	Votes	%
Democratic	Abe Murdock	155,499	62.85
Republican	Philo Farnsworth	91,931	37.15
Majority		63,568	25.70
Turnout		247,430	
Democratic hold			

== Vermont ==
There were 2 elections due to the June 20, 1940, death of two-term Republican Ernest Willard Gibson.

=== Vermont (regular) ===
1940 United States Senate Election in Vermont
- November 5, 1940
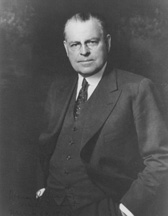

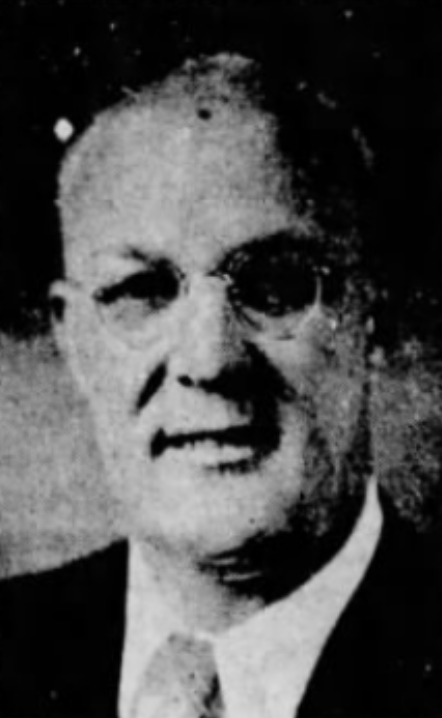
Nominee	Warren Austin	Ona Searles
Party	Republican	Democratic
Popular vote	93,283	47,101
Percentage	66.4%	33.6%
- Austin: 50–60% 60–70% 70–80% 80–90% 90–100% Searles: 50–60% 60–70% 80–90%
U.S. senator before election
Warren Austin
Republican
Elected U.S. Senator
Warren Austin
Republican

Two-term Republican Warren Austin was easily re-elected. He faced no opponents in the primary.

Vermont regular election
Party	Candidate	Votes	%
Republican	Warren Austin (Incumbent)	93,283	66.4
Democratic	Ona S. Searles	47,101	33.6
Total votes		140,384	100.0
Majority		46,182	32.9
Total votes		140,388	
Republican hold			

Austin served only until his August 2, 1946, resignation to become U.S. Ambassador to the United Nations.

=== Vermont (special) ===
1940 United States Senate Special Election in Vermont
- November 5, 1940
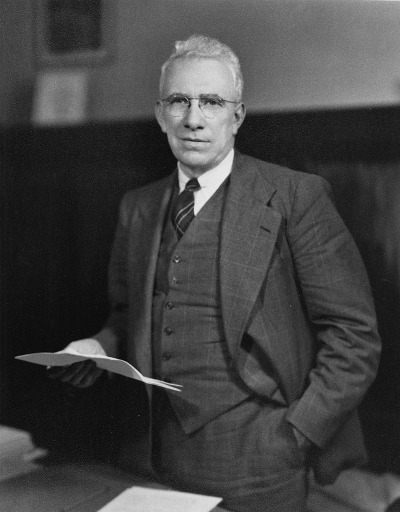

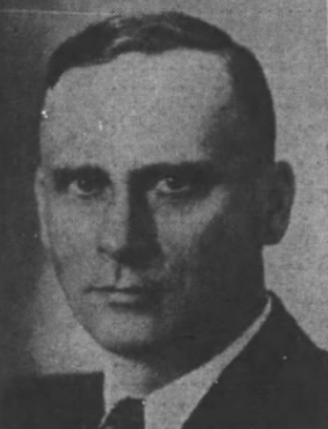
Nominee	George Aiken	Herbert Comings
Party	Republican	Democratic
Popular vote	87,150	54,263
Percentage	58.2%	38.4%
- Aiken: 50–60% 60–70% 70–80% 80–90% 90–100% Comings: 50–60% 60–70% 70–80% 80–90%
U.S. senator before election
Ernest W. Gibson Jr.
Republican
Elected U.S. Senator
George Aiken
Republican

Gibson's son, Republican Ernest W. Gibson Jr. was appointed June 24, 1940, to continue his father's term, pending a special election, in which he was not a candidate.

Vermont special election
Party	Candidate	Votes	%
Republican	George Aiken	87,150	61.6
Democratic	Herbert B. Comings	54,263	38.4
Majority		32,887	23.20
Total votes		141,413	
Republican hold			

Aiken did not take the seat until January 10, 1941, as he wanted to remain Governor of Vermont. He would be repeatedly re-elected and serve until his 1975 retirement.

== Virginia ==
1940 United States Senate election in Virginia
- November 5, 1940
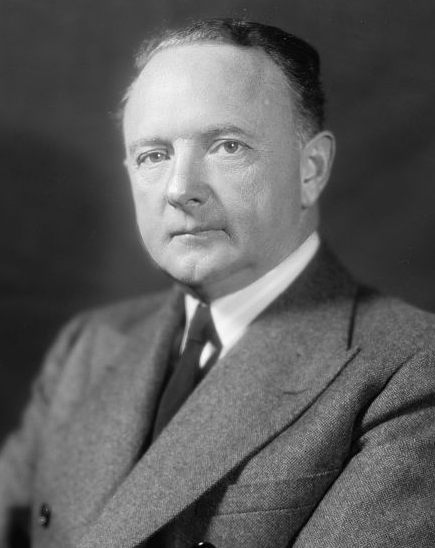
Nominee	Harry F. Byrd Sr.
Party	Democratic
Popular vote	274,260
Percentage	93.32%
- County and Independent City Results; Byrd: 80–90% 90–100%
U.S. senator before election
Harry F. Byrd Sr.
Democratic
Elected U.S. Senator
Harry F. Byrd Sr.
Democratic

1940 United States Senate election in Virginia
Party	Candidate	Votes	%	±%
Democratic	Harry F. Byrd Sr. (Incumbent)	274,260	93.32	+17.36%
Independent	Hilliard Berstein	11,159	3.80	
Independent	Alice Burke	8,250	2.81	
Write-ins		212	0.07	+0.05%
Majority		263,101	89.53	+34.50%
Turnout		293,881		
Democratic hold				

== Washington ==
1940 United States Senate election in Washington
- November 5, 1940
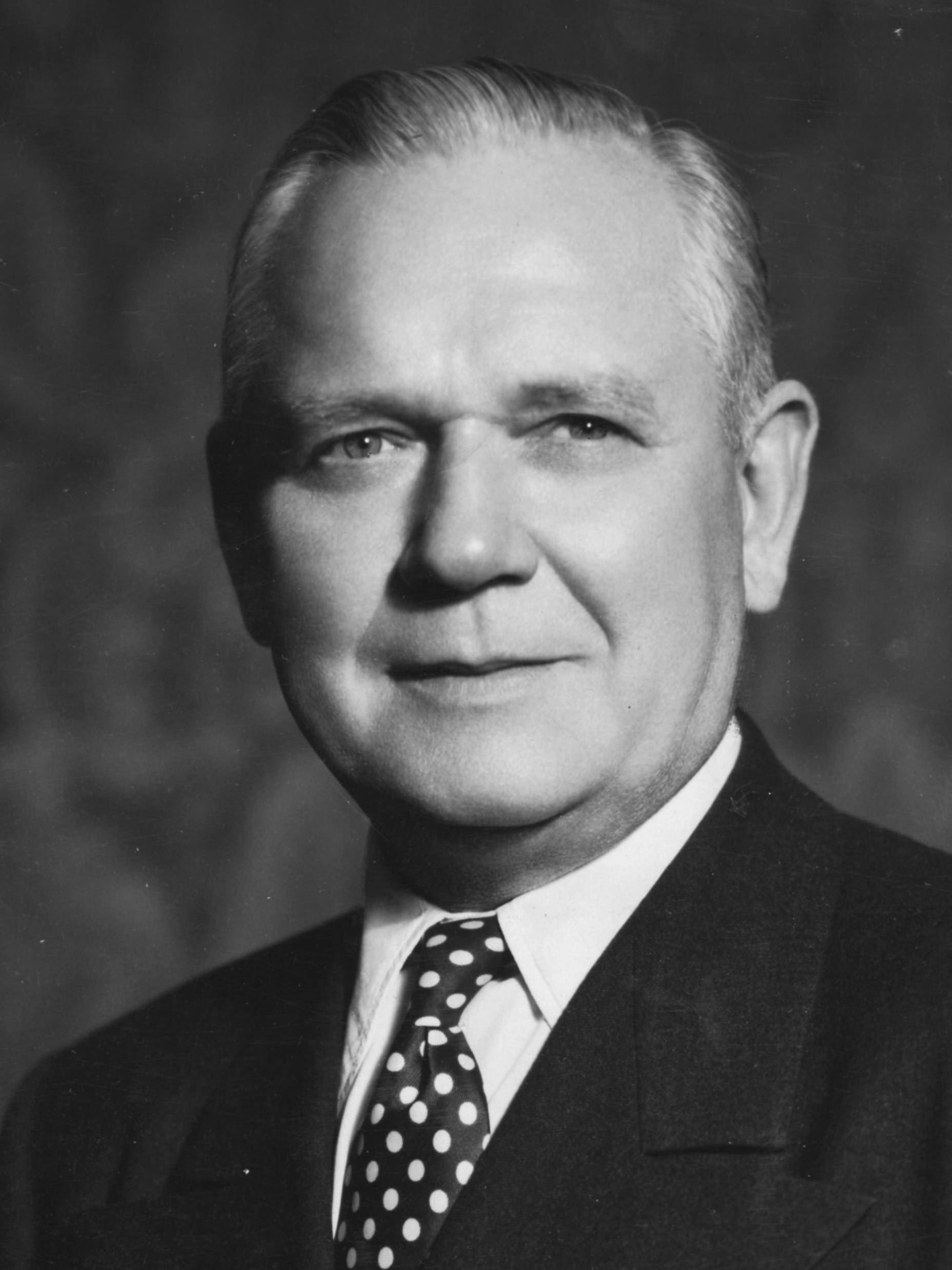

Nominee	Monrad Wallgren	Stephen F. Chadwick
Party	Democratic	Republican
Popular vote	404,718	342,589
Percentage	54.16%	45.84%
- County results Wallgren: 50–60% 60–70% Chadwick: 50–60% 60–70% 70–80%
U.S. senator before election
Lewis Schwellenbach
Democratic
Elected U.S. Senator
Monrad Wallgren
Democratic

1940 United States Senate election in Washington
Party	Candidate	Votes	%
Democratic	Monrad Wallgren	404,718	54.16
Republican	Stephen F. Chadwick	342,589	45.84
Majority		62,129	8.32
Turnout		747,307	
Democratic hold			

== West Virginia ==
1940 United States Senate election in West Virginia
- November 5, 1940
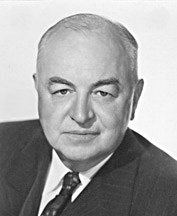
Nominee	Harley M. Kilgore	Thomas Sweeney
Party	Democratic	Republican
Popular vote	492,413	381,806
Percentage	56.33%	43.67%
- County results Kilgore: 50–60% 60–70% 70–80% Sweeney: 50–60% 60–70% 70–80%
U.S. senator before election
Rush D. Holt
Democratic
Elected U.S. Senator
Harley M. Kilgore
Democratic

1940 United States Senate election in West Virginia
Party	Candidate	Votes	%
Democratic	Harley M. Kilgore	492,413	56.33
Republican	Thomas Sweeney	381,806	43.67
Majority		110,607	12.66
Turnout		874,219	
Democratic hold			

== Wisconsin ==
1940 United States Senate election in Wisconsin
- November 5, 1940
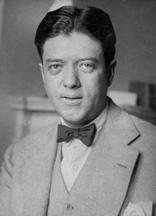

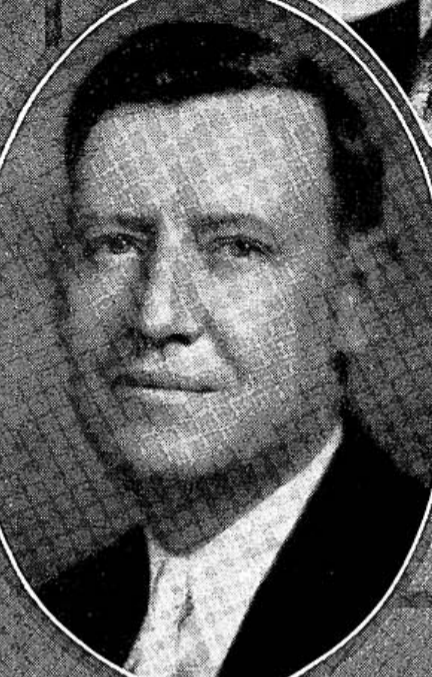
Nominee	Robert La Follette Jr.	Fred H. Clausen	James E. Finnegan
Party	Progressive	Republican	Democratic
Popular vote	605,609	553,692	176,688
Percentage	45.26%	41.38%	13.20%
- County results La Follete Jr.: 40–50% 50–60% 60–70% Clausen: 40–50% 50–60% 60–70%
U.S. senator before election
Robert La Follette Jr.
Progressive
Elected U.S. Senator
Robert La Follette Jr.
Progressive

1940 United States Senate election in Wisconsin
Party	Candidate	Votes	%
Progressive	Robert M. La Follette Jr. (Incumbent)	605,609	45.26
Republican	Fred H. Clausen	553,692	41.38
Democratic	James E. Finnegan	176,688	13.20
Independent Communist	Ted Furman	1,308	0.10
Socialist Labor	Adolf Wiggert Jr.	838	0.06
Majority		51,917	4.88
Turnout		1,338,135	
Progressive hold			

== Wyoming ==
1940 United States Senate election in Wyoming
- November 5, 1940
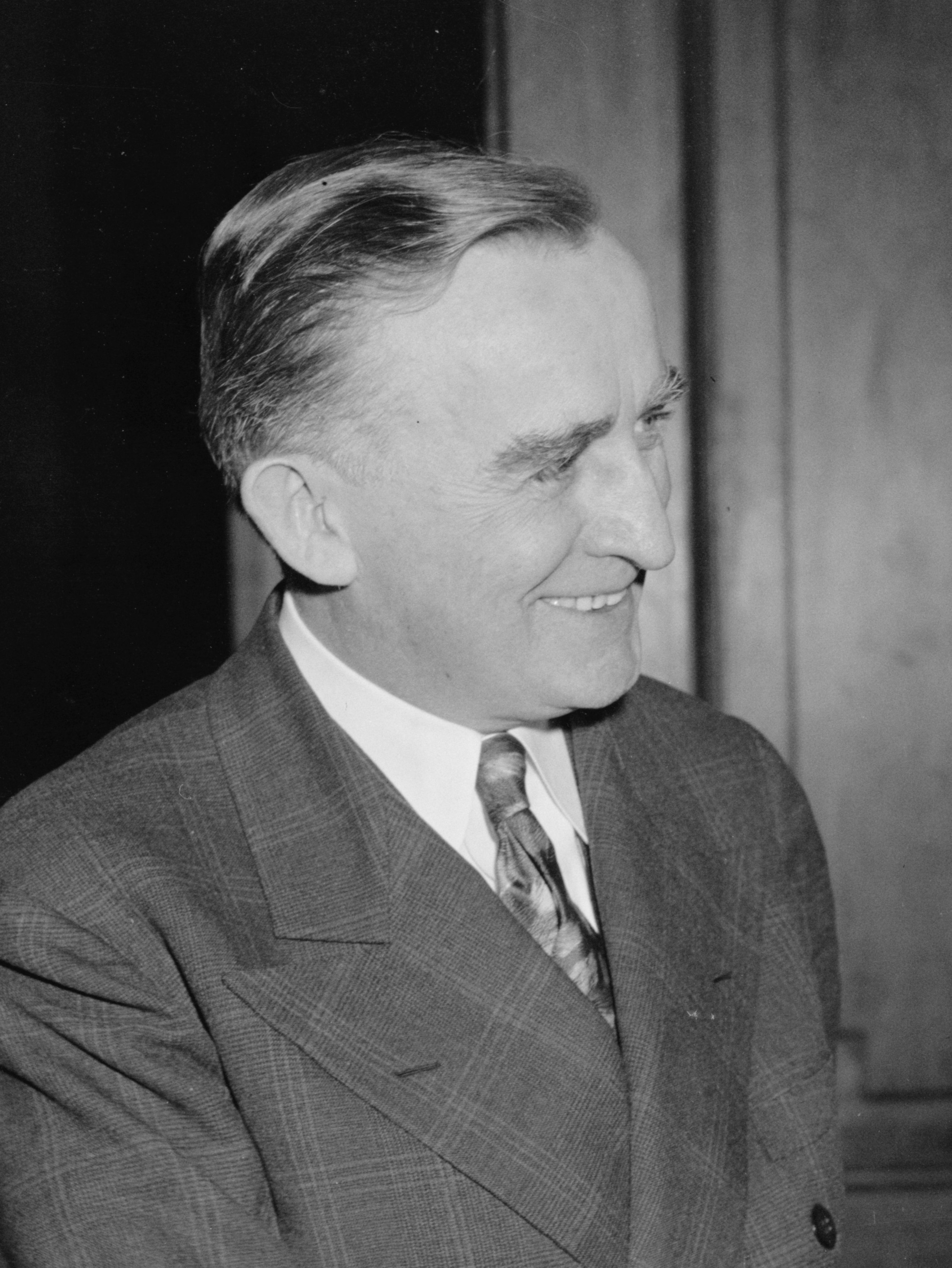

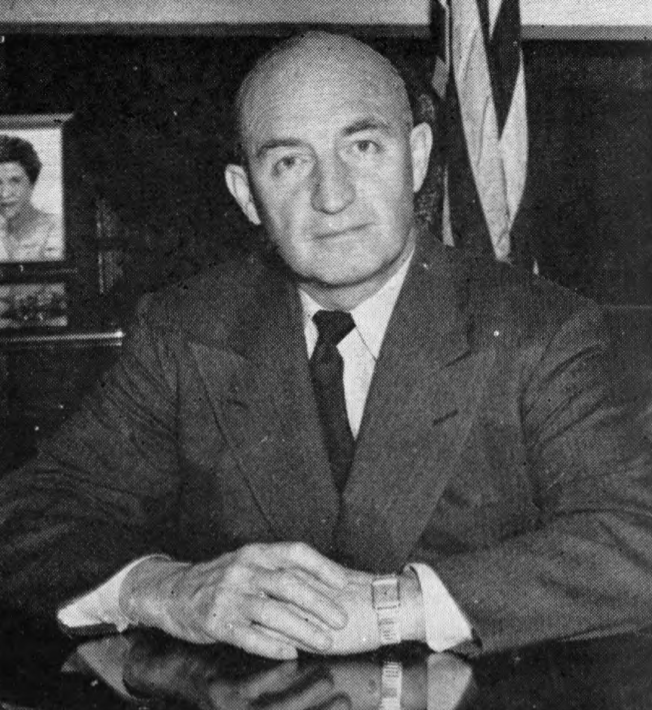
Nominee	Joseph C. O'Mahoney	Milward Simpson
Party	Democratic	Republican
Popular vote	65,022	45,682
Percentage	58.74%	41.26%
- County results O'Mahoney: 50–60% 60–70% 70–80% Simpson: 50–60%
U.S. senator before election
Joseph C. O'Mahoney
Democratic
Elected U.S. Senator
Joseph C. O'Mahoney
Democratic

1940 United States Senate election in Wyoming
Party	Candidate	Votes	%
Democratic	Joseph C. O'Mahoney (Incumbent)	65,022	58.74
Republican	Milward L. Simpson	45,682	41.26
Majority		19,340	17.48
Turnout		110,704	
Democratic hold			

== See also ==
- 1940 United States elections
  - 1940 United States presidential election
  - 1940 United States gubernatorial elections
  - 1940 United States House of Representatives elections
- 76th United States Congress
- 77th United States Congress
