= John Francis Fitzgerald =

John Francis Fitzgerald may refer to:

- John F. Fitzgerald (Boston politician, JFK grandfather)
- John Fitzgerald (1950s pitcher)
- France Fitzgerald, Irish-born player of American football player
