= 1940 United States Senate election in Michigan =

- November 5, 1940
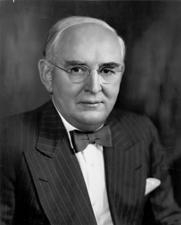

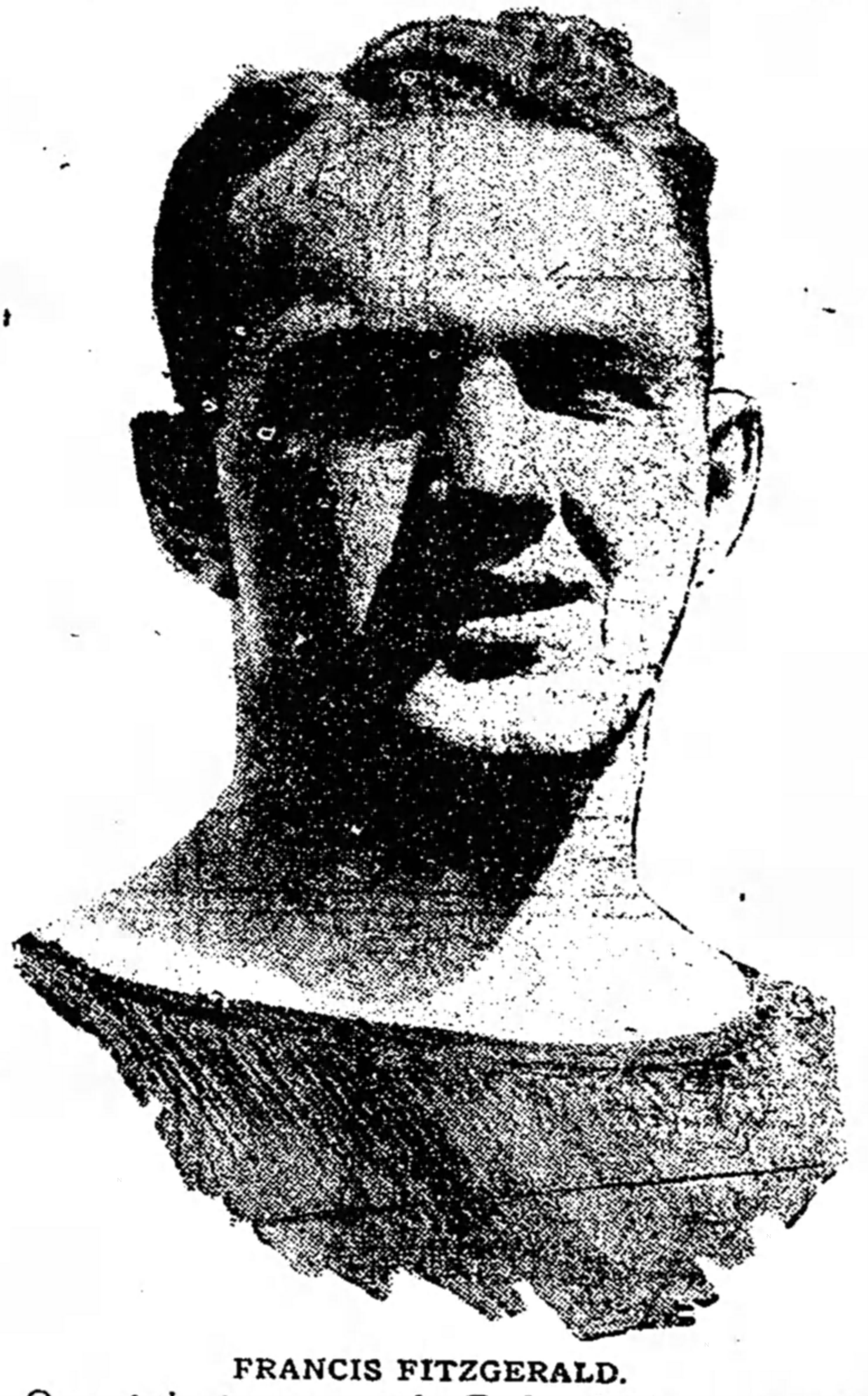
Nominee	Arthur Vandenberg	Frank FitzGerald
Party	Republican	Democratic
Popular vote	1,053,104	939,740
Percentage	52.65%	46.98%
- County results Vandenberg: 40–50% 50–60% 60–70% 70–80% 80–90% FitzGerald: 50–60% 60–70%
U.S. senator before election
Arthur Vandenberg
Republican
Elected U.S. Senator
Arthur Vandenberg
Republican

The 1940 United States Senate election in Michigan was held on November 5, 1940.

Republican Senator Arthur Vandenberg was re-elected to a third consecutive term over Democratic judge Frank FitzGerald.

== Republican primary ==
=== Candidates ===
- Bowen R. Gover, perennial candidate
- Arthur Vandenberg, incumbent Senator since 1928

=== Results ===
1940 Republican U.S. Senate primary
Party	Candidate	Votes	%
Republican	Arthur Vandenberg (incumbent)	467,314	89.88%
Republican	Bowen R. Gover	52,645	10.13%
Total votes		519,959	100.00%

== Democratic primary ==
=== Candidates ===
- Sid A. Erwin
- Frank FitzGerald, Wayne County Circuit Court Commissioner
- Michael J. Hart, U.S. Representative from Saginaw
- Ralph W. Liddy
- Louis B. Ward, editor of Social Justice and candidate for Senate in 1936

=== Results ===
1940 Democratic U.S. Senate primary
Party	Candidate	Votes	%
Democratic	Frank FitzGerald	209,809	63.22%
Democratic	Michael J. Hart	38,658	11.65%
Democratic	Louis B. Ward	37,258	11.23%
Democratic	Ralph W. Liddy	27,498	8.29%
Democratic	Sid A. Erwin	18,629	5.61%
Total votes		331,852	100.00%

== General election ==
=== Results ===
1940 U.S. Senate election in Michigan
Party	Candidate	Votes	%	±%
Republican	Arthur Vandenberg (incumbent)	1,053,104	52.65%	▲1.33
Democratic	Frank FitzGerald	939,740	46.98%	▼0.05
Socialist	Nahum Burnett	3,580	0.18%	▼0.69
Prohibition	Carroll P. Pahman	937	0.05%	N/A
Socialist Labor	Theos A. Grove	691	0.04%	▼0.04
Communist	Elmer G. Johnson	2,290	0.11%	▼0.35
Total votes		2,000,342	100.00%	N/A
Republican hold				

== See also ==
- 1940 United States Senate elections
