= Frank FitzGerald (judge) =

American football player and judge (1896–1961)

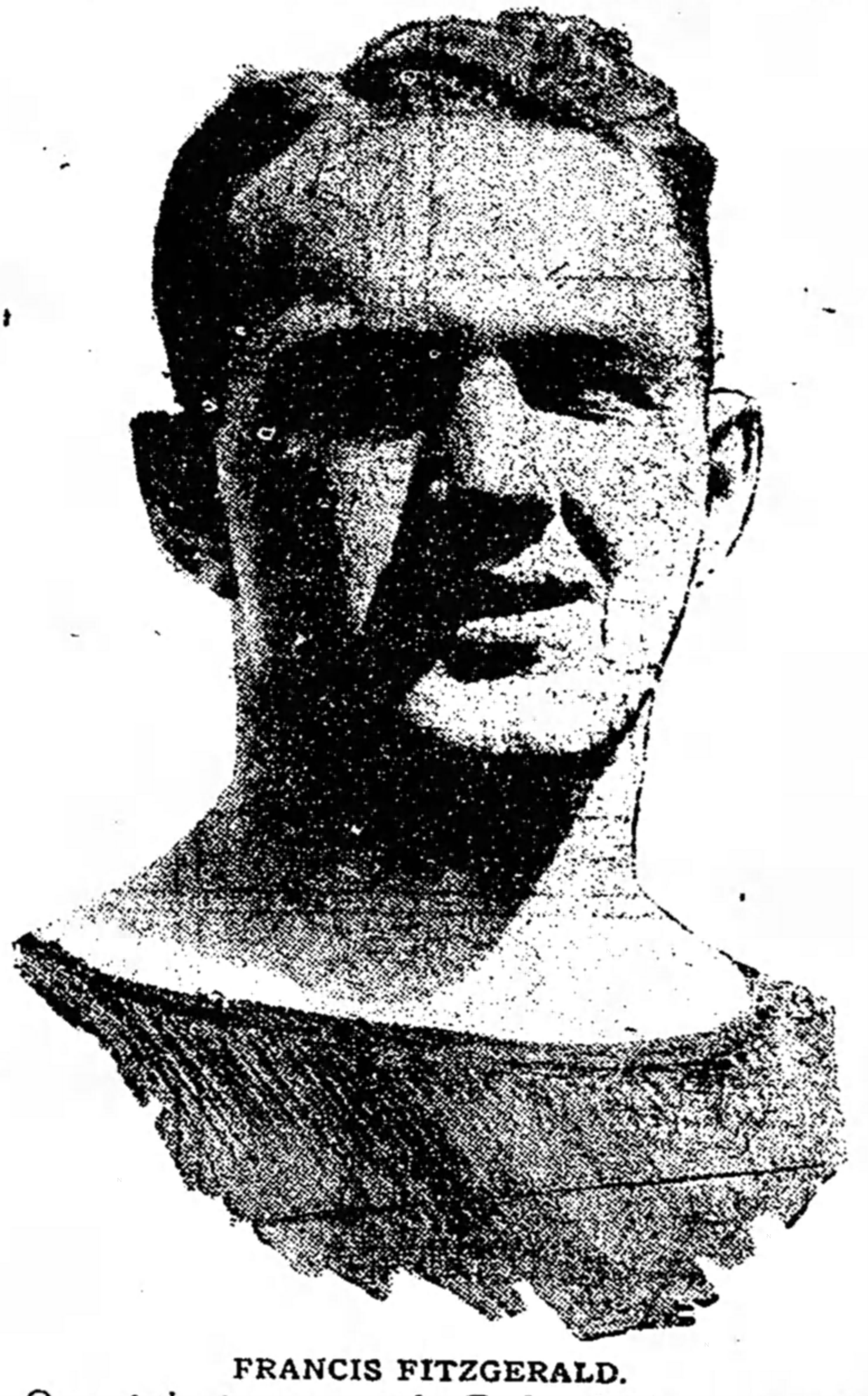
- Fitzgerald in 1921

Profile
- Position: Halfback

Personal information
- Born: August 22, 1896; Holyoke, Massachusetts, U.S.
- Died: July 23, 1961 (aged 64); Detroit, Michigan, U.S.
- Listed height: 5 ft 10 in (1.78 m)
- Listed weight: 185 lb (84 kg)

Career information
- High school: Holyoke (MA)
- College: University of Detroit

Career history
- Toledo Maroons (1923)

Career statistics
- Games: 7

John Francis FitzGerald (August 22, 1896 – July 23, 1961), sometimes referred to as France Fitzgerald, was an American football player and judge.

Born in Massachusetts, he attended Holyoke High School. He played college football as a halfback, playing on both offense and defense, at the University of Detroit during the 1917, 1919, 1920, and 1921 seasons.

His education was interrupted during World War I with service in the United States Army. He played professional football as a halfback for the Toledo Maroons in the National Football League (NFL). He appeared in seven NFL games, six as a starter, during the 1923 season.

He studied law at the University of Detroit, worked for a time as a probation officer, and served as a Wayne County Circuit Court Commissioner for several years. He became active in politics and ran for the United States Senate in 1940, losing to incumbent Senator Arthur Vandenberg. In 1943, he ran for Mayor of Detroit, receiving more votes in the primary than the incumbent Mayor Edward Jeffries, but then losing to Jeffries in the general election.

He was elected as a judge of the Wayne County Circuit Court in 1947 and served in that capacity until his death in July 1961.

Party political offices
Preceded by Frank Albert Picard	Democratic nominee for U.S. Senator from Michigan (Class 1); 1940	Succeeded by James H. Lee
