= 1946 United States Senate election in Nevada =

- November 5, 1946
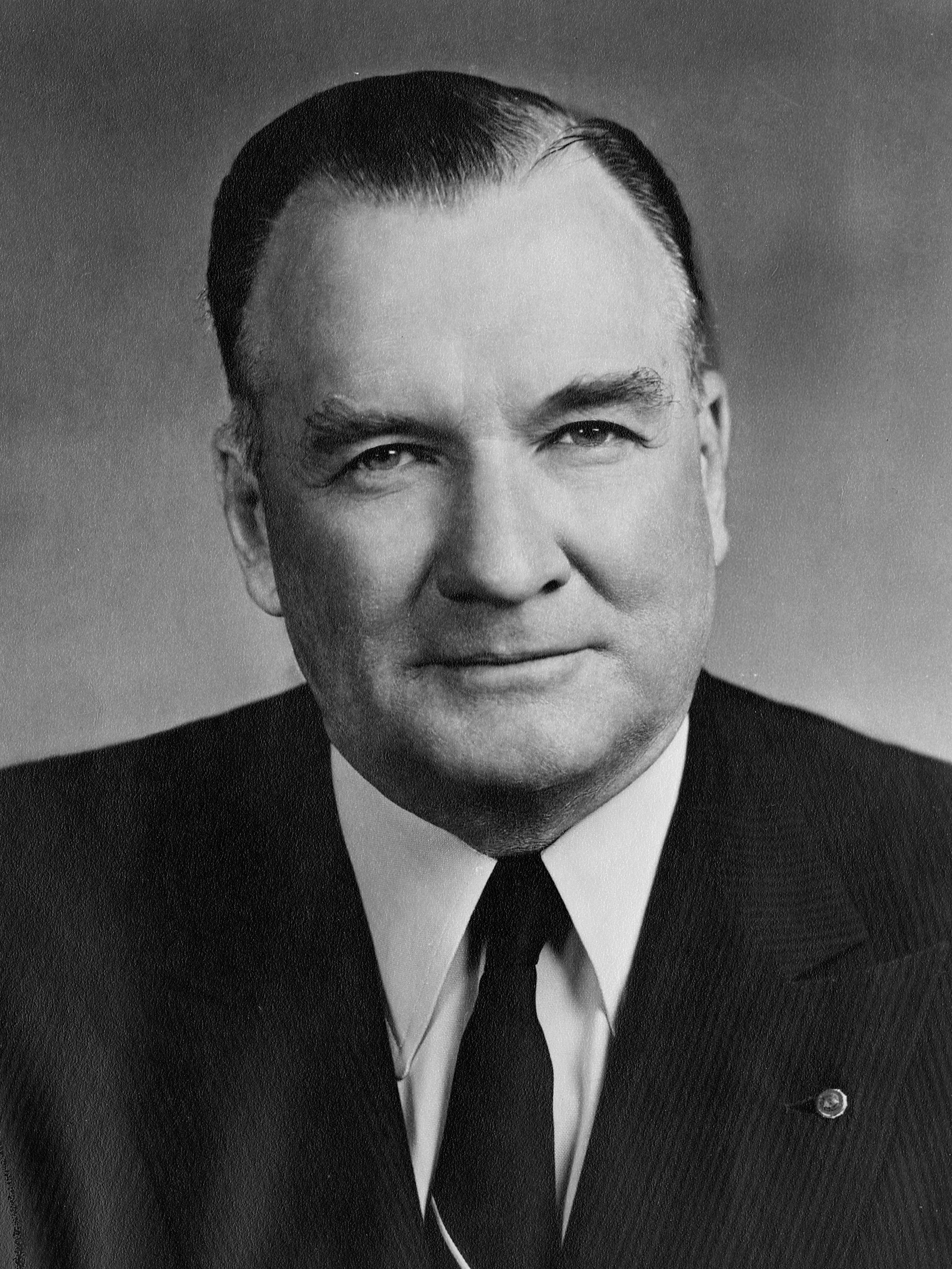

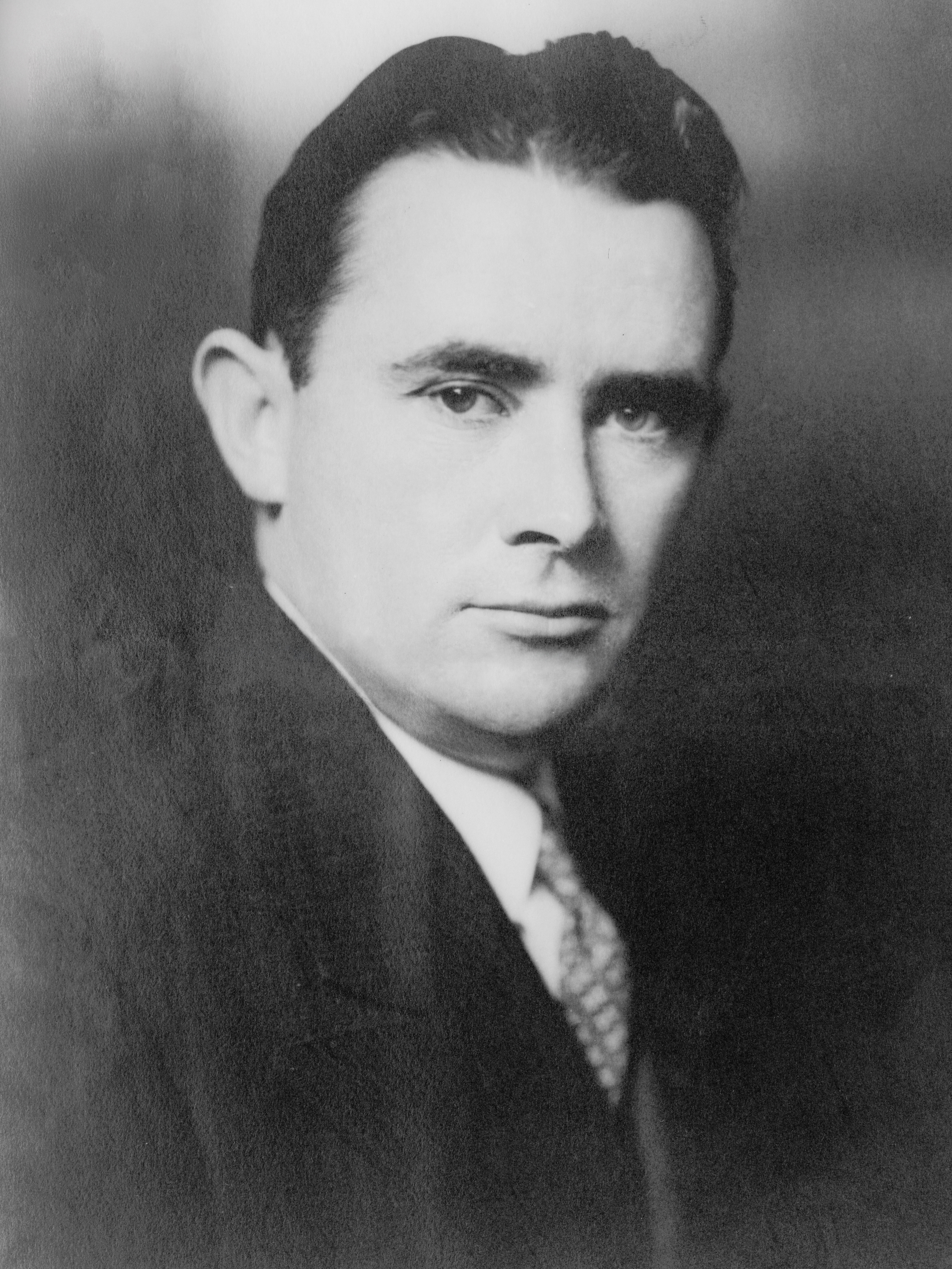
Nominee	George W. Malone	Berkeley L. Bunker
Party	Republican	Democratic
Popular vote	27,801	22,553
Percentage	55.21%	44.79%
- County results Malone: 50–60% 60–70% 70–80% Bunker: 50–60% 60–70%
U.S. senator before election
Edward P. Carville
Democratic
Elected U.S. Senator
George W. Malone
Republican

The 1946 United States Senate election in Nevada took place on November 5, 1946. Berkeley L. Bunker, who had defeated appointed incumbent senator Edward P. Carville in the Democratic primary, lost to Republican challenger George W. Malone.

After Senator Key Pittman's death shortly after he won the 1940 Senate election, Governor Edward P. Carville appointed Berkeley L. Bunker to the seat. However, Bunker lost the Democratic primary in the 1942 Senate special election to James G. Scrugham, who won the special election. Then, Scrugham died in 1945 before he could run for a full term, so Governor Carville resigned to have his lieutenant governor, Vail Pittman, appoint him to the seat. However, Carville lost the primary to Berkeley L. Bunker, as many people didn't like the move of effectively appointing himself. The Democrats' "fourteen-year itch" along with voters being affected by Carville's move to basically appoint himself senator caused Republican George W. Malone to win.

== Primary elections ==
Primary elections were held on September 3, 1946.

=== Democratic primary ===
This Senate election's Democratic primary was very similar to the one in the special election four years earlier. In both cases, an appointed incumbent senator lost renomination to the representative from Nevada's at-large congressional district.

==== Candidates ====
- Edward P. Carville, appointed incumbent U.S. Senator and former Governor of Idaho (1939-1945)
- Berkeley L. Bunker, U.S. Representative from the at-large district (1945-1947) and former appointed U.S. Senator

==== Results ====
Democratic primary results
Party	Candidate	Votes	%
Democratic	Berkeley L. Bunker	13,354	55.23
Democratic	Edward P. Carville (incumbent)	10,826	44.77
Total votes		24,180	

=== Republican primary ===
==== Candidates ====
- George W. Malone, engineer and candidate for this seat in 1934 and Nevada's other Senate seat in 1944
- George E. Marshall
- Kendrick Johnson, candidate for Nevada's other Senate seat in 1944
- James A. Caughman, former member of the Nevada state legislature

==== Results ====
Republican primary results
Party	Candidate	Votes	%
Republican	George W. Malone	5,642	52.01
Republican	George E. Marshall	3,790	34.94
Republican	Kendrick Johnson	1,050	9.68
Republican	James A. Caughman	366	3.37
Total votes		10,848	

== General election ==
=== Results ===
1946 United States Senate election in Nevada
Party	Candidate	Votes	%
Republican	George W. Malone	27,801	55.21
Democratic	Berkeley L. Bunker	22,553	44.79
Majority		5,248	10.42
Turnout		50,354	
Republican gain from Democratic			
