= 1940 United States Senate election in Nevada =

- November 5, 1940
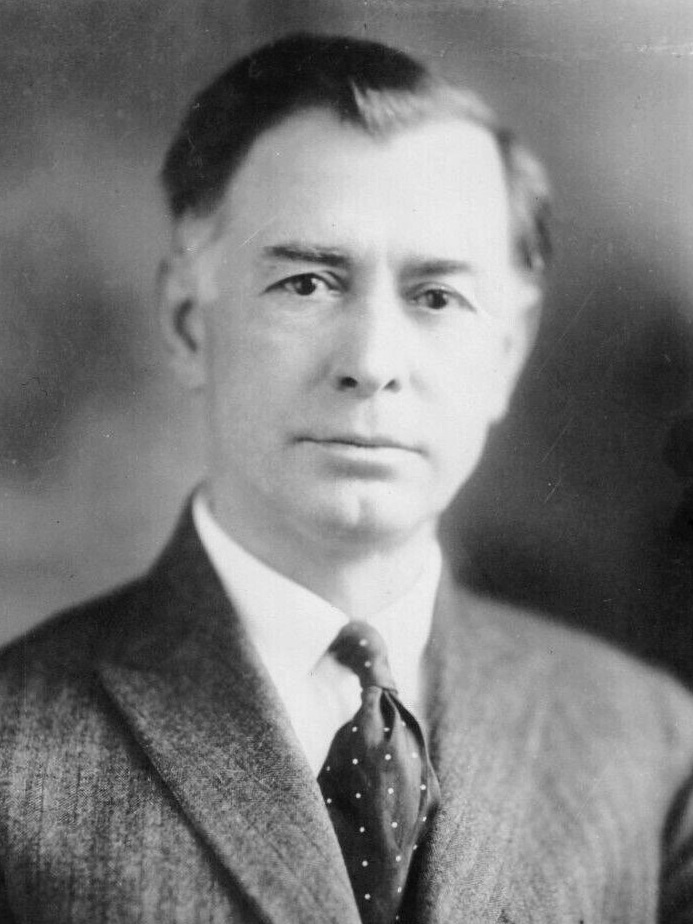

Nominee	Key Pittman	Samuel Platt
Party	Democratic	Republican
Popular vote	31,351	20,488
Percentage	60.48%	39.52%
- County results Pittman: 50–60% 60–70% 70–80% 80–90% Platt: 50–60%
U.S. senator before election
Key Pittman
Democratic
Elected U.S. Senator
Key Pittman
Democratic

The 1940 United States Senate election in Nevada took place on November 5, 1940. Incumbent Democratic Senator Key Pittman won re-election to a sixth term (fifth full term) against Sam Platt (who Pittman also won against in 1916 and 1928), but died before the term could start, leading to a special election in 1942.

Pittman suffered a severe heart attack just before the election on November 5, and two doctors told his aides before the election that death was imminent. To avoid affecting the election, the party told the press that the senator was hospitalized for exhaustion and that his condition was not serious. Pittman died on November 10 at the Washoe General Hospital in Reno, Nevada. Governor Edward Carville would go on to appoint Berkeley L. Bunker as his replacement.

In later years, a myth spread that Pittman had in fact died before the election, and his body had been kept on ice in the Mizpah Hotel in Tonopah so that Carville could appoint his replacement.

== Primary elections ==
Primary elections were held on September 3, 1940.

=== Democratic primary ===
==== Candidates ====
- Key Pittman, incumbent U.S. Senator

Pittman ran unopposed for the Democratic nomination, so there was no Democratic primary.

=== Republican primary ===
==== Candidates ====
- Samuel Platt, former Speaker of the Nevada House of Representatives (1905-1907) and candidate for this seat in 1916 and 1928
- Harry H. Atkinson, attorney
- Clarence R. Pugh
- Clyde D. Souter, candidate for this seat in 1934

==== Results ====
Republican primary results
Party	Candidate	Votes	%
Republican	Samuel Platt	3,970	40.19
Republican	Harry H. Atkinson	3,304	33.45
Republican	Clarence R. Pugh	1,504	15.23
Republican	Clyde D. Souter	1,099	11.13
Total votes		9,877	

== General election ==
=== Results ===
1940 United States Senate election in Nevada
Party	Candidate	Votes	%
Democratic	Key Pittman (incumbent)	31,351	60.48
Republican	Samuel Platt	20,488	39.52
Majority		10,863	20.96
Turnout		51,839	
Democratic hold			
