= 1942 United States Senate special election in Nevada =

- November 3, 1942
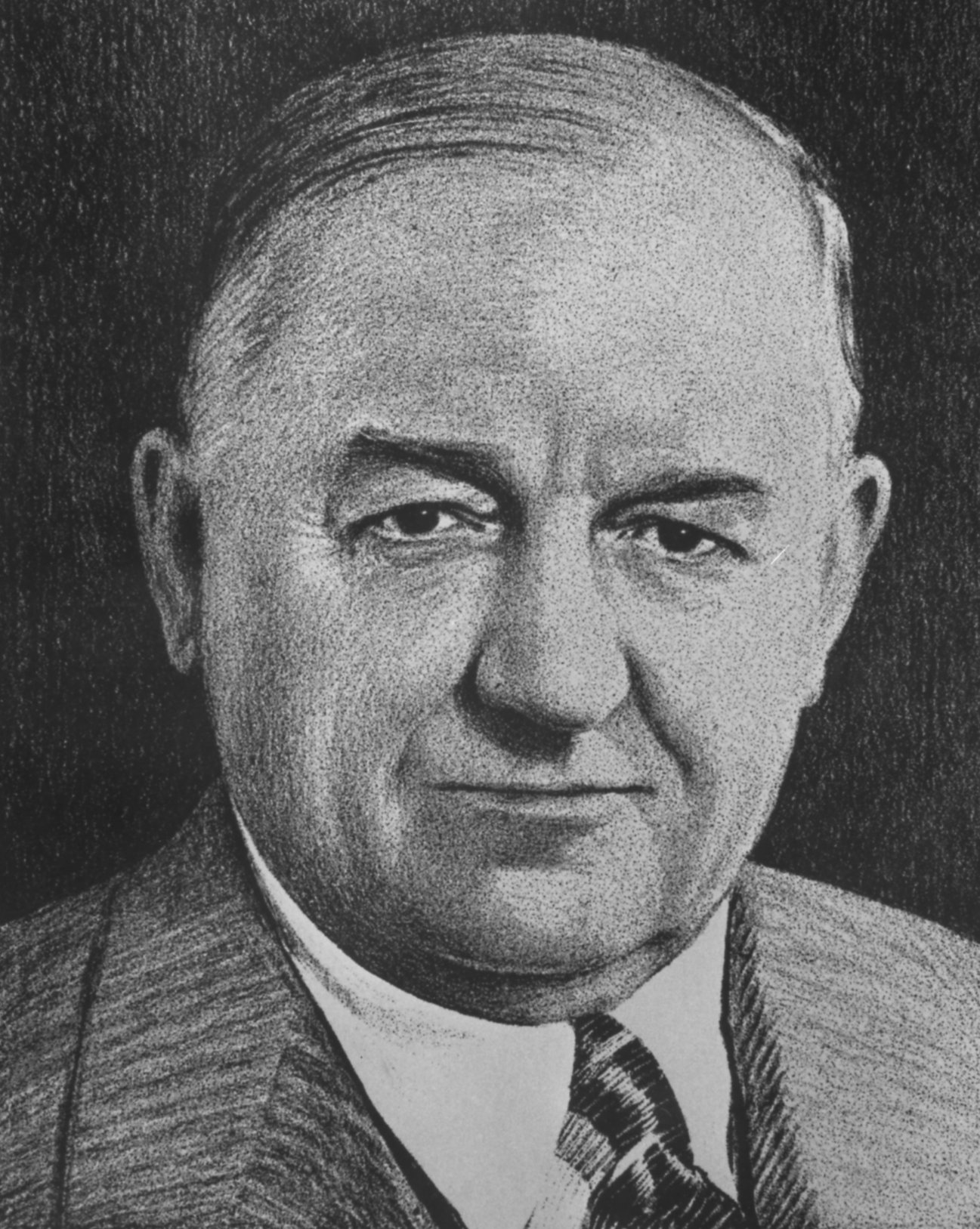
Nominee	James G. Scrugham	Cecil W. Creel
Party	Democratic	Republican
Popular vote	23,805	16,735
Percentage	58.72%	41.28%
- County results Scrugham: 50–60% 60–70% 70–80% Creel: 50–60% 60–70%
U.S. senator before election
Berkeley L. Bunker
Democratic
Elected U.S. Senator
James G. Scrugham
Democratic

The 1942 United States Senate special election in Nevada took place on November 3, 1942. James G. Scrugham, who had defeated appointed incumbent senator Berkeley L. Bunker in the Democratic primary, won a partial term against Cecil W. Creel.

Key Pittman won re-election to a sixth term (fifth full term) in the 1940 Senate election, but died before the term could start. Governor Edward P. Carville appointed Berkeley L. Bunker to the seat, but Bunker lost the Democratic primary to James G. Scrugham, the U.S. Representative from Nevada's at-large congressional district.

== Primary elections ==
Primary elections were held on September 1, 1942.

=== Democratic primary ===
==== Candidates ====
- Berkeley L. Bunker, appointed incumbent U.S. Senator
- James G. Scrugham, U.S. Representative from the at-large district (1933-1942)

==== Results ====
James G. Scrugham's vote lead over Berkeley L. Bunker is almost exactly a tenth of the total number of votes he got (1,146 vote lead, 11,461 votes total).

Democratic primary results
Party	Candidate	Votes	%
Democratic	James G. Scrugham	11,461	52.63
Democratic	Berkeley L. Bunker (incumbent)	10,315	47.37
Total votes		21,776	

=== Republican primary ===
==== Candidates ====
- Cecil W. Creel

Creel ran unopposed for the Republican nomination, so there was no Republican primary.

== General election ==
=== Results ===
1942 United States Senate special election in Nevada
Party	Candidate	Votes	%
Democratic	James G. Scrugham	23,805	58.72
Republican	Cecil W. Creel	16,735	41.28
Majority		7,070	17.44
Turnout		40,540	
Democratic hold			
