= George W. Malone =

American politician (1890–1961)

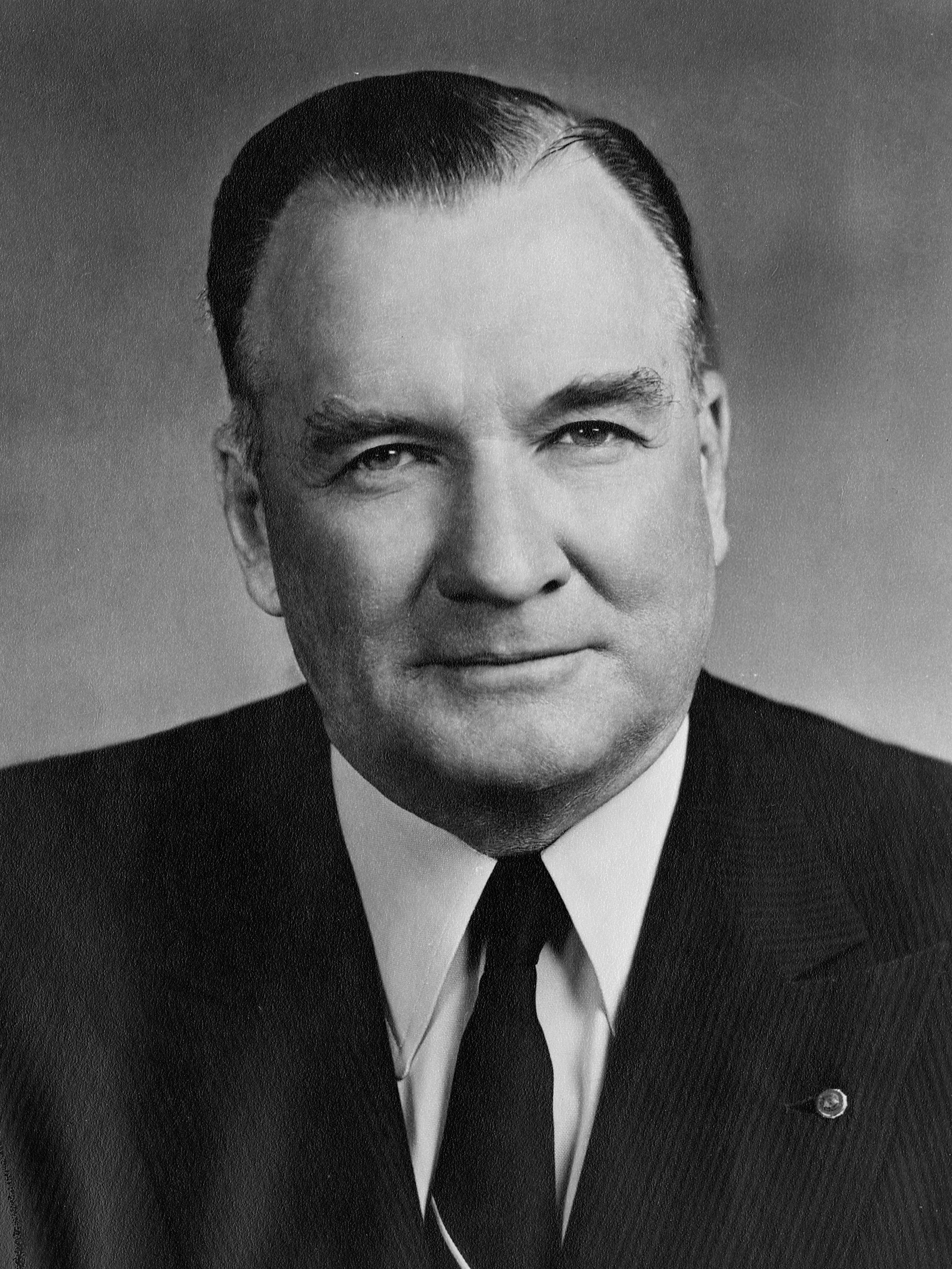
- Official portrait, c. 1947–1959

United States Senator from Nevada
- In office January 3, 1947 – January 3, 1959
- Preceded by: Edward P. Carville
- Succeeded by: Howard Cannon

Personal details
- Born: August 7, 1890 Fredonia, Kansas, U.S.
- Died: May 19, 1961 (aged 70) Washington, D.C., U.S.
- Party: Republican
- Spouse: Ruth (m. 1921)
- Education: University of Nevada, Reno
- Profession: Civil engineer
- Nickname: Molly

George Wilson Malone (August 7, 1890 – May 19, 1961) was an American civil engineer and Republican politician. He served as a U.S. senator from Nevada from 1947 to 1959.

== Early life ==
Malone was born in Fredonia, Kansas. As a young man, he moved to Reno, Nevada and worked as a civil and hydraulic engineer there while he was attending the University of Nevada, Reno.

== Military service ==
Malone graduated from college in 1917, and he enlisted in the army when the United States entered World War I. At first, he served in the artillery, but he eventually became a regimental intelligence officer and served in England and France until 1919.

== Civilian career ==
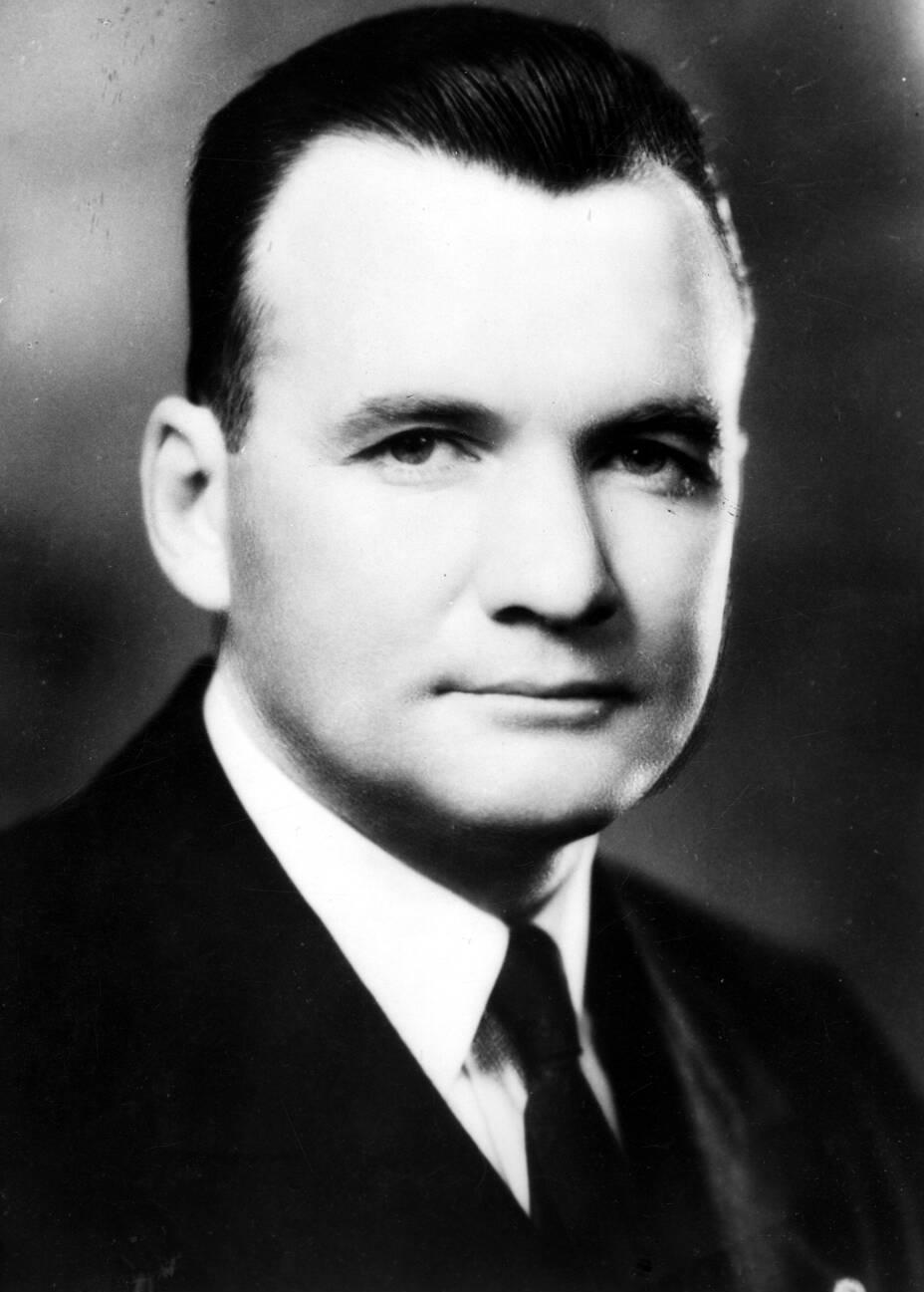
Malone as a candidate for national commander of the American Legion, 1932.

Malone then returned to work in engineering. He served as the state engineer of Nevada from 1927 to 1935.

=== Political career ===
Malone entered politics in 1934 when he made his first attempt to be elected to the United States Senate from Nevada. He was defeated by the Democratic incumbent Key Pittman, receiving 33% of the vote. During World War II, Malone worked for the Senate as an engineering consultant on war materials. Malone ran again for a seat in the United States Senate in 1944, this time against Democratic incumbent Pat McCarran. Malone was defeated again, receiving 41% of the vote.

Malone successfully campaigned for a seat in the Senate in 1946. He defeated the Democratic candidate, former Senator Berkeley L. Bunker, receiving 55% of the vote. Malone was reelected to the Senate in 1952, receiving 51% of the vote. He was defeated for re-election in 1958 by Democrat Howard W. Cannon, receiving 42% of the vote. He served in the Senate from 1947 to 1959. He was an isolationist who supported tariffs.

== Retirement ==
Malone continued to live in Washington, D.C. working as an engineering consultant. He made a final political campaign in 1960, for a seat in the United States House of Representatives from Nevada but was defeated. Malone died from cancer in Washington less than a year later, on May 19, 1961, aged 70; he is buried in Arlington National Cemetery.

== Sources ==
- United States Congress. "George W. Malone (id: M000086)". Biographical Directory of the United States Congress.

Party political offices
Preceded by Samuel Platt	Republican nominee for U.S. Senator from Nevada (Class 1); 1934	Succeeded by Samuel Platt
Preceded by Tasker Oddie	Republican nominee for U.S. Senator from Nevada (Class 3); 1944	Succeeded by George E. Marshall
Preceded by Cecil W. Creel	Republican nominee for U.S. Senator from Nevada (Class 1); 1946, 1952, 1958	Succeeded by Paul Laxalt
U.S. Senate
Preceded by Edward P. Carville	U.S. senator (Class 1) from Nevada; 1947–1959; Served alongside: Pat McCarran, Ernest S. Brown, Alan Bible	Succeeded by Howard Cannon
