= 1944 United States Senate election in Nevada =

- November 7, 1944
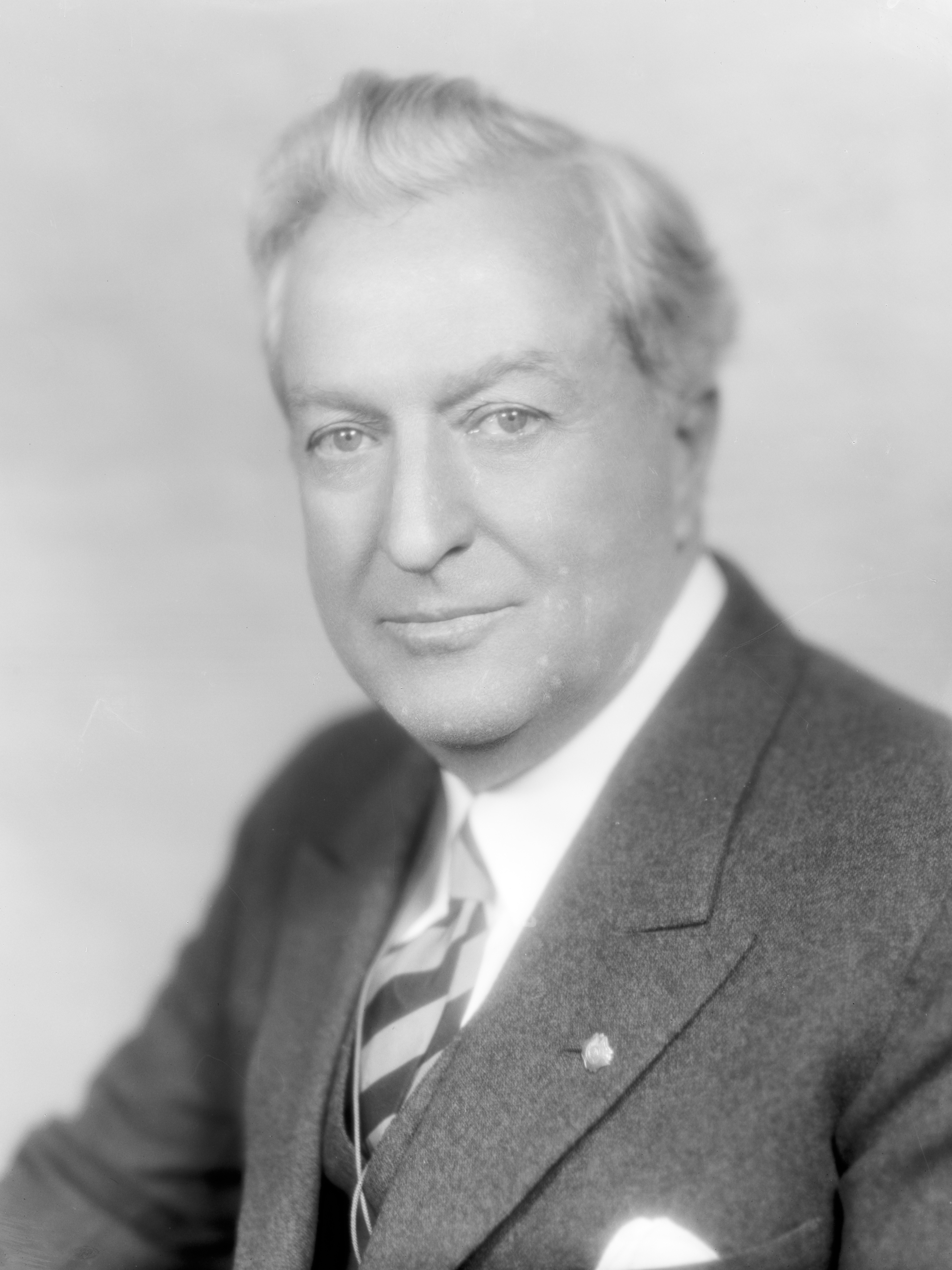

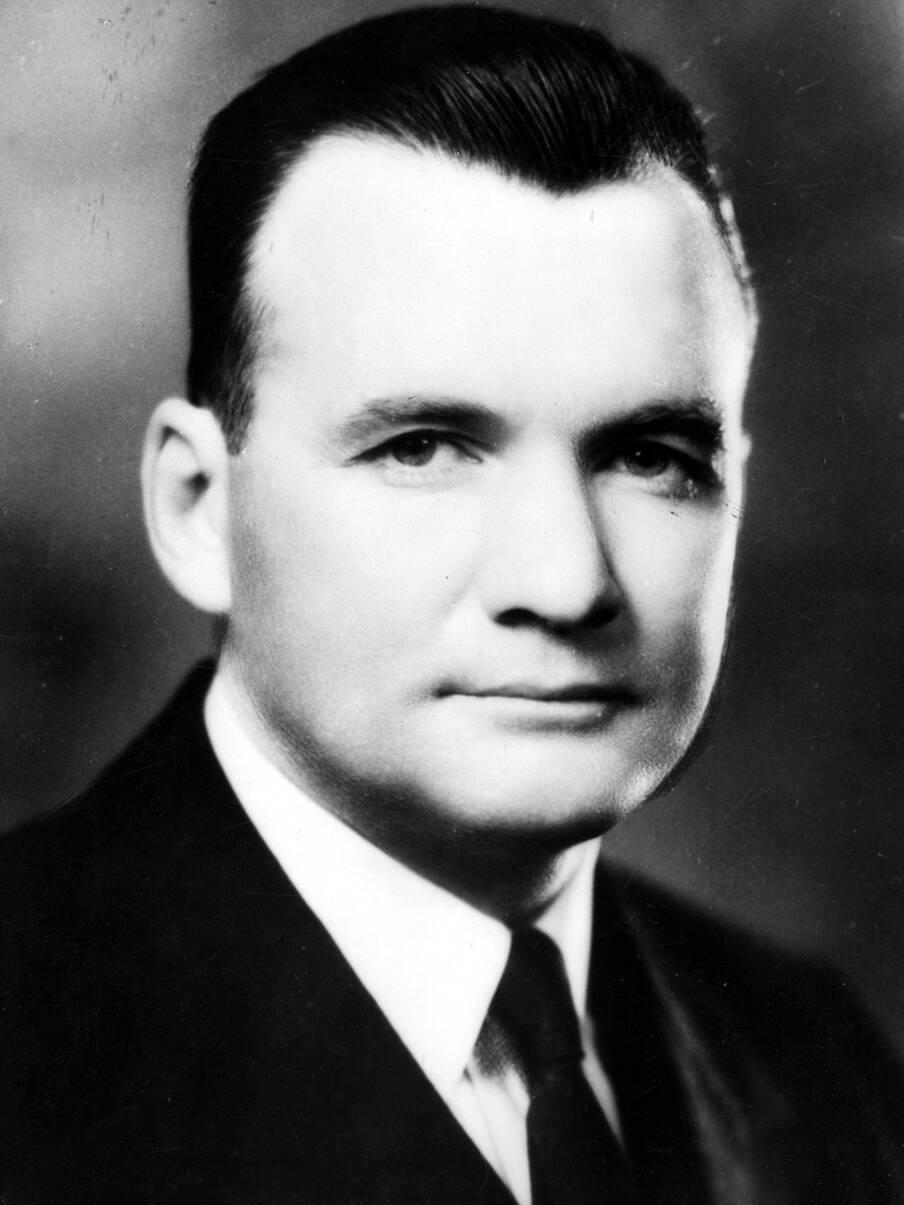
Nominee	Pat McCarran	George W. Malone
Party	Democratic	Republican
Popular vote	30,595	21,816
Percentage	58.38%	41.62%
- County results McCarran: 50–60% 60–70% Malone: 50–60%
U.S. senator before election
Pat McCarran
Democratic
Elected U.S. Senator
Pat McCarran
Democratic

The 1944 United States Senate election in Nevada took place on November 7, 1944. Incumbent Democratic Senator Pat McCarran won re-nomination in the Democratic primary after a tough primary challenge from Lieutenant Governor Vail Pittman, then won re-election in the general election to a third term over Republican George W. Malone.

== Primary elections ==
Primary elections were held on September 5, 1944.

=== Democratic primary ===
==== Candidates ====
- Pat McCarran, incumbent U.S. Senator
- Vail Pittman, Lieutenant Governor of Nevada (1943-1945) and younger brother of former Senator Key Pittman

==== Results ====
Democratic primary results
Party	Candidate	Votes	%
Democratic	Pat McCarran (incumbent)	11,152	52.95
Democratic	Vail Pittman	9,911	47.05
Total votes		21,063	

=== Republican primary ===
==== Candidates ====
- George W. Malone, engineer and candidate for Nevada's other Senate seat in 1934
- Kenneth F. Johnson, member of the Nevada State Senate
- Kendrick Johnson

==== Results ====
Republican primary results
Party	Candidate	Votes	%
Republican	George W. Malone	5,125	57.76
Republican	Kenneth F. Johnson	2,719	30.64
Republican	Kendrick Johnson	1,029	11.60
Total votes		8,873	

== General election ==
=== Results ===
1944 United States Senate election in Nevada
Party	Candidate	Votes	%
Democratic	Pat McCarran (incumbent)	30,595	58.38
Republican	George W. Malone	21,816	41.62
Majority		8,779	16.76
Turnout		52,411	
Democratic hold			
