= 1952 United States Senate election in Nevada =

- November 4, 1952
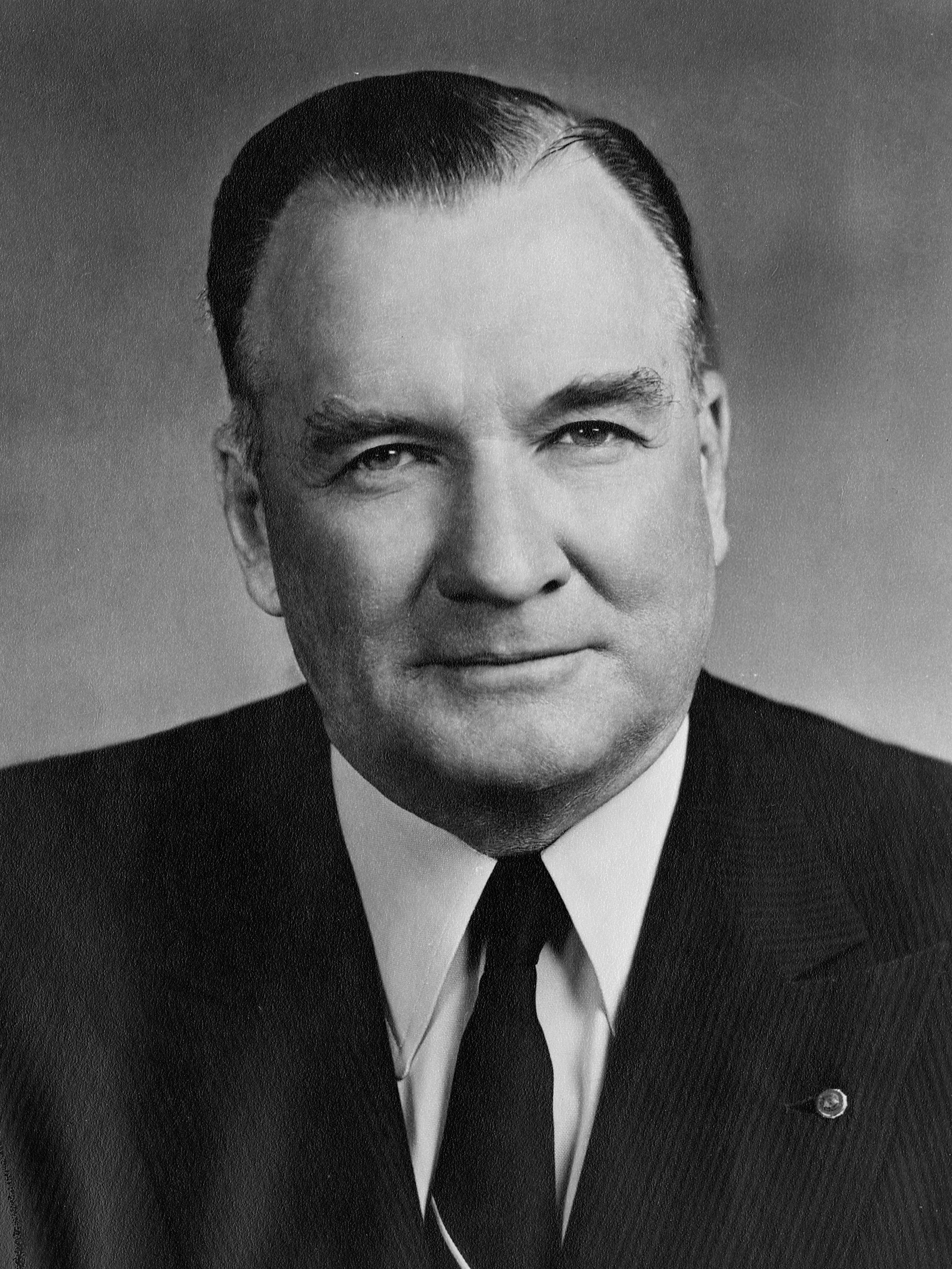

Nominee	George W. Malone	Thomas B. Mechling
Party	Republican	Democratic
Popular vote	41,906	39,184
Percentage	51.68%	48.32%
- County results Malone: 50–60% 60–70% 70–80% Mechling: 50–60% 60–70%
U.S. senator before election
George W. Malone
Republican
Elected U.S. Senator
George W. Malone
Republican

The 1952 United States Senate election in Nevada took place on November 4, 1952. Incumbent Republican U.S. Senator George W. Malone was re-elected to a second term in office. George Wilson Malone defeated Thomas B. Mechling by a very narrow margin despite George Wilson Malone's fellow Republican Dwight David Eisenhower winning the state over Adlai Stevenson II in a landslide in the concurrent presidential election in Nevada.

== Primary elections ==
Primary elections were held on September 2, 1952.

=== Democratic primary ===
==== Candidate ====
- Alan Bible, attorney, former Attorney General of Nevada
- Thomas B. Mechling, former Washington, D.C. newspaper writer

==== Results ====
Democratic primary results
Party	Candidate	Votes	%
Democratic	Thomas B. Mechling	15,914	50.76
Democratic	Alan Bible	15,439	49.24
Total votes		31,353	

=== Republican primary ===
==== Candidates ====
- Lawrence A. Ebert, gas station owner
- George W. Malone, incumbent U.S. Senator

==== Results ====
Republican primary results
Party	Candidate	Votes	%
Republican	George W. Malone (incumbent)	16,672	79.54
Republican	Lawrence A. Ebert	4,288	20.46
Total votes		20,960	

== General election ==
=== Results ===
General election results
Party	Candidate	Votes	%
Republican	George W. Malone (incumbent)	41,906	51.68
Democratic	Thomas B. Mechling	39,184	48.32
Majority		2,722	3.36
Turnout		81,090	
Republican hold			

== Bibliography ==
- Congressional Elections, 1946-1996. Washington, D.C.: Congressional Quarterly Inc. 1998. ISBN 1-56802-248-4.
- Secretary of State of Nevada; Research Division of the Legislative Counsel Bureau (2016). "Chapter 9: Election Results". Political History of Nevada (PDF) (12th ed.). Carson City: Barbara Cegavske. p. 456.
