= 1958 United States Senate election in Nevada =

- November 4, 1958
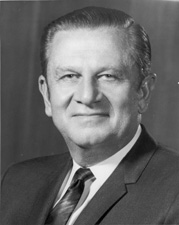

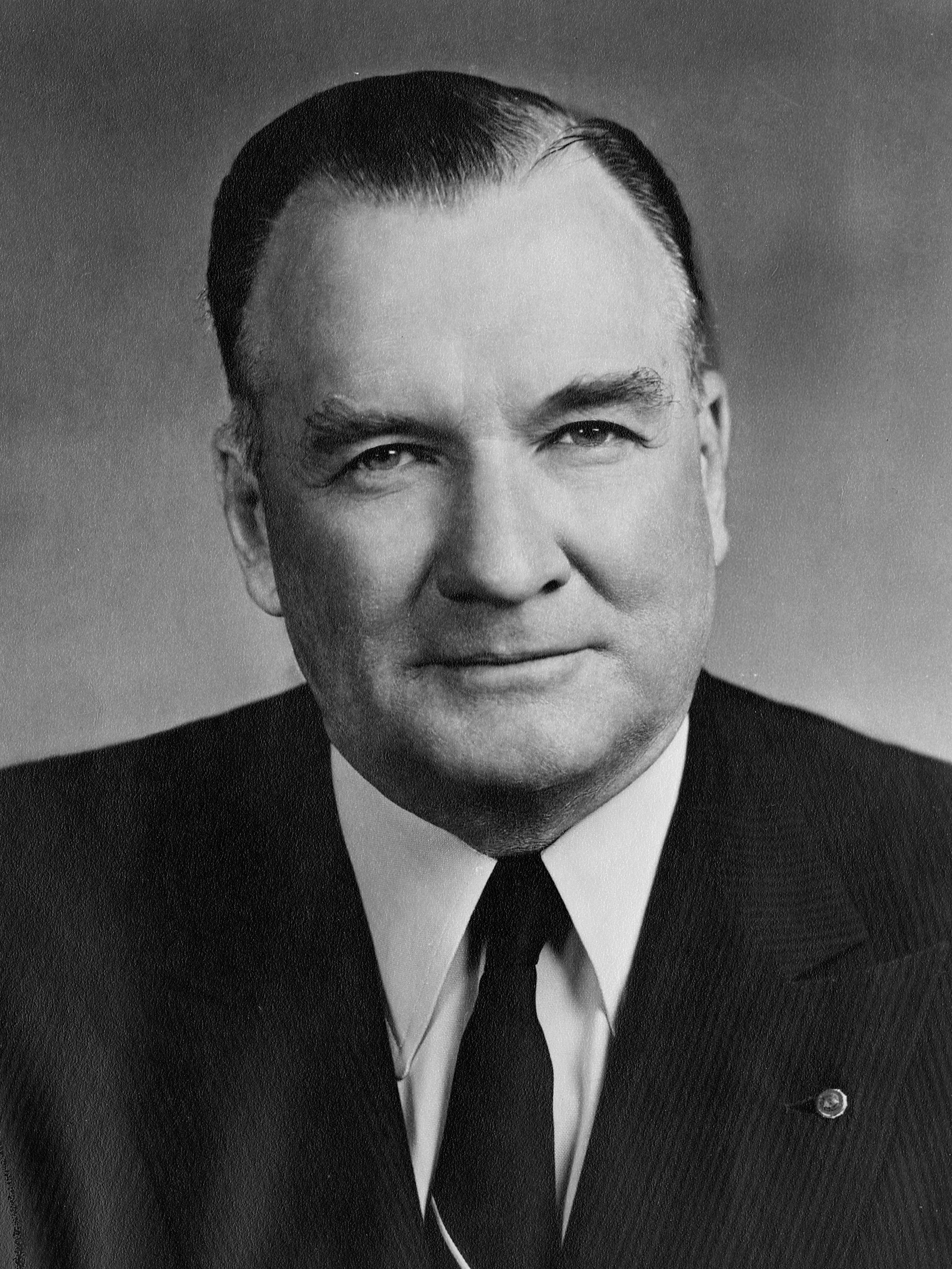
Nominee	Howard Cannon	George W. Malone
Party	Democratic	Republican
Popular vote	48,732	35,760
Percentage	57.65%	42.32%
- County results Cannon: 50–60% 70–80% Malone: 50–60% 60–70%
U.S. senator before election
George W. Malone
Republican
Elected U.S. Senator
Howard Cannon
Democratic

The 1958 United States Senate election in Nevada was held on November 4, 1958. Incumbent Republican U.S. Senator George W. Malone ran for re-election to a third term, but was defeated by Democrat Howard Cannon.

== Republican primary ==
=== Candidates ===
- George W. Malone, incumbent U.S. Senator

=== Results ===
Senator Malone was unopposed for re-nomination by the Republican Party.

== Democratic primary ==
=== Candidates ===
- Fred Anderson, surgeon from Reno and member of the University of Nevada Board of Regents
- Howard Cannon, City Attorney of Las Vegas

1958 Democratic U.S. Senate primary
Party	Candidate	Votes	%
Democratic	Howard Cannon	22,787	51.66%
Democratic	Fred Anderson	21,319	48.34%
Total votes		44,106	100.00%

== General election ==
=== Campaign ===
This campaign was considered one of the most competitive and highly watched in the nation in 1958. Senator Malone was known nationally as a leader within the Republican Party's right wing and held key appointments on the Senate Finance and Interior Committees.

Malone campaigned on his experience and seniority in the Senate, using the slogan "He Knows Nevada Best." He received support from Eisenhower cabinet secretaries Fred Seaton and Ezra Taft Benson. Benson, one of the Twelve Apostles of the Church of Jesus Christ of Latter-Day Saints, was especially influential among Nevada's large Mormon population. His endorsement was seen as particularly important in light of Cannon's Mormon faith. Late in the campaign, Malone published full-page ads touting his effort to save Nevada from a federal gambling tax.

Cannon focused his attacks on Malone's absentee record in the Senate and his reputation on Capitol Hill as an unpopular extremist.

=== Results ===
Cannon easily won the election owing to his overwhelming support in his native Clark County, which contained 47 percent of the state's registered voters. He was the first candidate from southern Nevada elected to the United States Senate.

General election results
Party	Candidate	Votes	%	±%
Democratic	Howard Cannon	48,732	57.65	▲7.63
Republican	George W. Malone (incumbent)	35,760	42.32	▼9.35
Majority		12,972	15.35	▲12.00
Turnout		84,492		
Democratic gain from Republican		Swing		

== See also ==
- 1958 United States Senate elections
