= List of United States senators from Nevada =

Current delegation

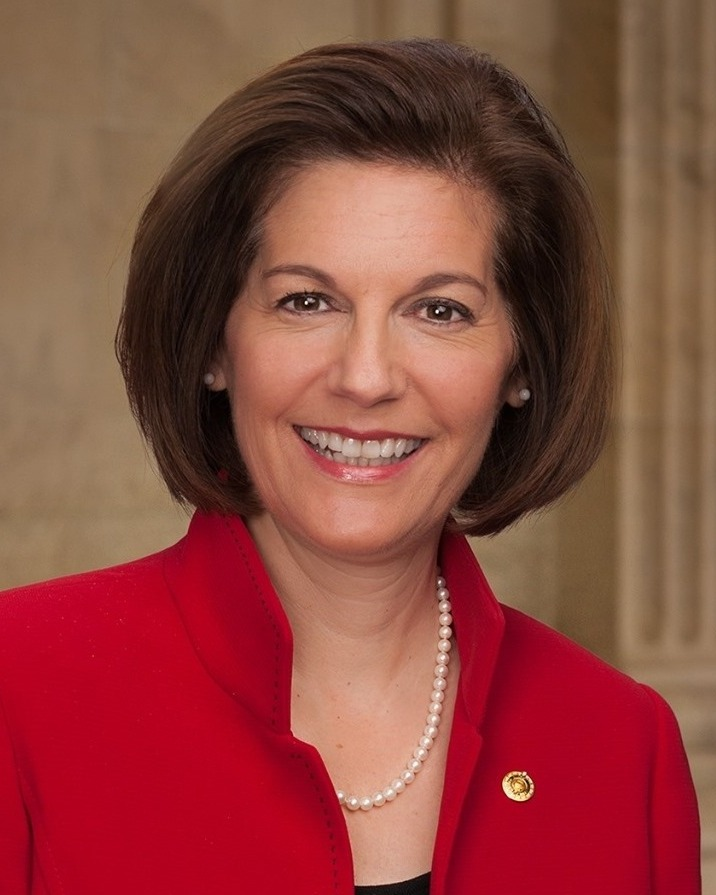
Catherine Cortez Masto (D)

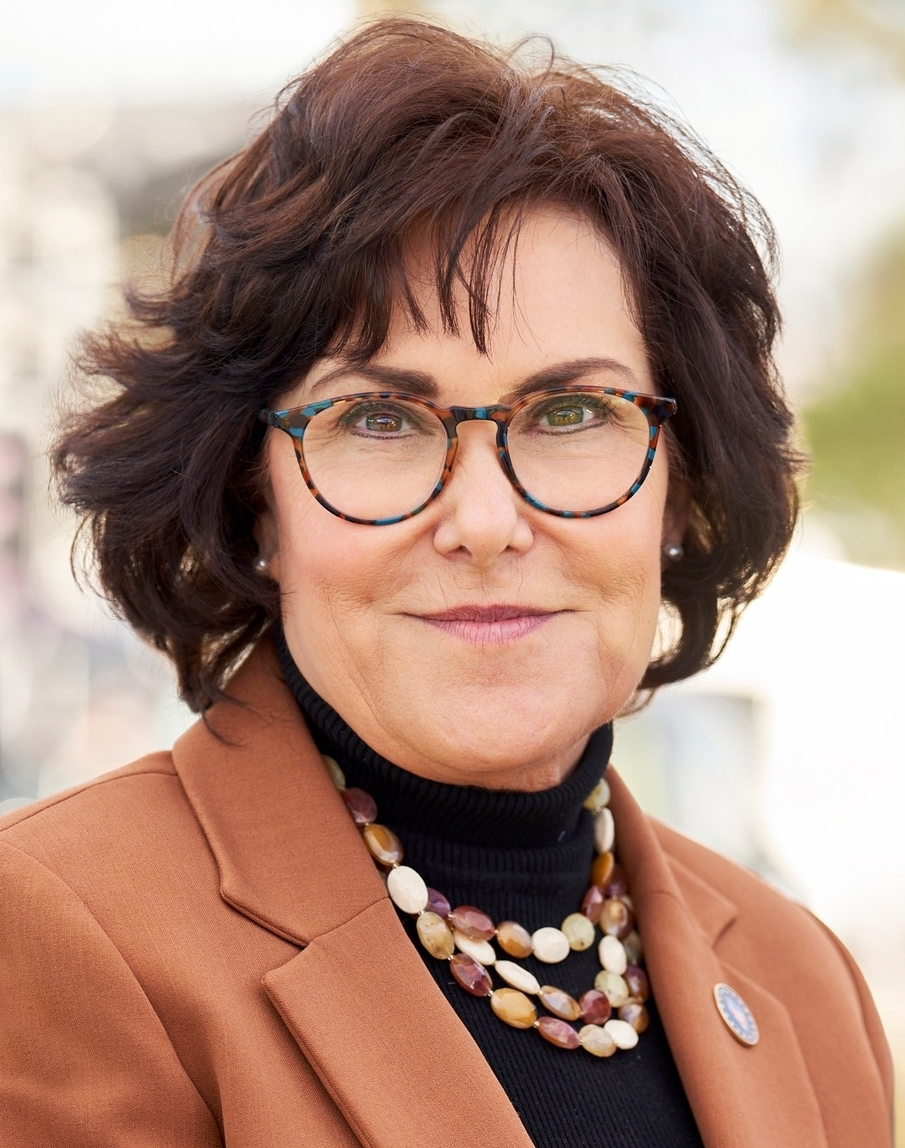
Jacky Rosen (D)

(ordered by seniority)

Nevada was admitted to the Union on October 31, 1864 and has been represented in the United States Senate by 28 people. Its current U.S. senators are Democrats Catherine Cortez Masto (class 3, serving since 2017) and Jacky Rosen (class 1, serving since 2019), making it one of only four states alongside Minnesota, New Hampshire and Washington to have two female U.S. senators. Nevada has been represented by 14 Republicans and 14 Democrats. Harry Reid was Nevada's longest-serving senator (1987–2017).

== List of senators ==
Class 1 Class 1 senators belong to the electoral cycle that most recently had regular elections in 2006, 2012, 2018, and 2024. The next election will be in 2030.						C	Class 3 Class 3 senators belong to the electoral cycle that most recently had regular elections in 2004, 2010, 2016, and 2022. The next election will be in 2028.					
#	Senator	Party	Dates in office	Electoral history	T	C	T	Electoral history	Dates in office	Party	Senator	#
1	William M. Stewart (Virginia City)	Republican	Feb 1, 1865 – Mar 3, 1875	Elected in 1865.	1	38th	1	Elected in 1865.	Feb 1, 1865 – Mar 3, 1873	Republican	James W. Nye (Carson City)	1
1	William M. Stewart (Virginia City)	Republican	Feb 1, 1865 – Mar 3, 1875	Elected in 1865.	1	39th	1	Elected in 1865.	Feb 1, 1865 – Mar 3, 1873	Republican	James W. Nye (Carson City)	1
1	William M. Stewart (Virginia City)	Republican	Feb 1, 1865 – Mar 3, 1875	Elected in 1865.	1	40th	2	Re-elected in 1867. Lost re-nomination.	Feb 1, 1865 – Mar 3, 1873	Republican	James W. Nye (Carson City)	1
1	William M. Stewart (Virginia City)	Republican	Feb 1, 1865 – Mar 3, 1875	Re-elected in 1869. Retired.	2	41st	2	Re-elected in 1867. Lost re-nomination.	Feb 1, 1865 – Mar 3, 1873	Republican	James W. Nye (Carson City)	1
1	William M. Stewart (Virginia City)	Republican	Feb 1, 1865 – Mar 3, 1875	Re-elected in 1869. Retired.	2	42nd	2	Re-elected in 1867. Lost re-nomination.	Feb 1, 1865 – Mar 3, 1873	Republican	James W. Nye (Carson City)	1
1	William M. Stewart (Virginia City)	Republican	Feb 1, 1865 – Mar 3, 1875	Re-elected in 1869. Retired.	2	43rd	3	Elected in 1873.	Mar 4, 1873 – Mar 3, 1903	Republican	John P. Jones (Gold Hill)	2
2	William Sharon (Virginia City)	Republican	Mar 4, 1875 – Mar 3, 1881	Elected in 1875. Retired or lost renomination.	3	44th	3	Elected in 1873.	Mar 4, 1873 – Mar 3, 1903	Republican	John P. Jones (Gold Hill)	2
2	William Sharon (Virginia City)	Republican	Mar 4, 1875 – Mar 3, 1881	Elected in 1875. Retired or lost renomination.	3	45th	3	Elected in 1873.	Mar 4, 1873 – Mar 3, 1903	Republican	John P. Jones (Gold Hill)	2
2	William Sharon (Virginia City)	Republican	Mar 4, 1875 – Mar 3, 1881	Elected in 1875. Retired or lost renomination.	3	46th	4	Re-elected in 1879.	Mar 4, 1873 – Mar 3, 1903	Republican	John P. Jones (Gold Hill)	2
3	James G. Fair (Virginia City)	Democratic	Mar 4, 1881 – Mar 3, 1887	Elected in 1881. Lost re-election.	3	47th	4	Re-elected in 1879.	Mar 4, 1873 – Mar 3, 1903	Republican	John P. Jones (Gold Hill)	2
3	James G. Fair (Virginia City)	Democratic	Mar 4, 1881 – Mar 3, 1887	Elected in 1881. Lost re-election.	3	48th	4	Re-elected in 1879.	Mar 4, 1873 – Mar 3, 1903	Republican	John P. Jones (Gold Hill)	2
3	James G. Fair (Virginia City)	Democratic	Mar 4, 1881 – Mar 3, 1887	Elected in 1881. Lost re-election.	3	49th	5	Re-elected in 1885.	Mar 4, 1873 – Mar 3, 1903	Republican	John P. Jones (Gold Hill)	2
4	William M. Stewart (Carson City)	Republican	Mar 4, 1887 – Mar 3, 1905	Elected in 1887.	4	50th	5	Re-elected in 1885.	Mar 4, 1873 – Mar 3, 1903	Republican	John P. Jones (Gold Hill)	2
4	William M. Stewart (Carson City)	Republican	Mar 4, 1887 – Mar 3, 1905	Elected in 1887.	4	51st	5	Re-elected in 1885.	Mar 4, 1873 – Mar 3, 1903	Republican	John P. Jones (Gold Hill)	2
4	William M. Stewart (Carson City)	Republican	Mar 4, 1887 – Mar 3, 1905	Elected in 1887.	4	52nd	6	Re-elected in 1891.	Mar 4, 1873 – Mar 3, 1903	Republican	John P. Jones (Gold Hill)	2
4	William M. Stewart (Carson City)	Silver	Mar 4, 1887 – Mar 3, 1905	Re-elected in 1893.	5	53rd	6	Re-elected in 1891.	Mar 4, 1873 – Mar 3, 1903	Republican	John P. Jones (Gold Hill)	2
4	William M. Stewart (Carson City)	Silver	Mar 4, 1887 – Mar 3, 1905	Re-elected in 1893.	5	54th	6	Re-elected in 1891.	Mar 4, 1873 – Mar 3, 1903	Silver	John P. Jones (Gold Hill)	2
4	William M. Stewart (Carson City)	Silver	Mar 4, 1887 – Mar 3, 1905	Re-elected in 1893.	5	55th	7	Re-elected in 1897. Retired.	Mar 4, 1873 – Mar 3, 1903	Silver	John P. Jones (Gold Hill)	2
4	William M. Stewart (Carson City)	Silver	Mar 4, 1887 – Mar 3, 1905	Re-elected in 1899. Retired.	6	56th	7	Re-elected in 1897. Retired.	Mar 4, 1873 – Mar 3, 1903	Silver	John P. Jones (Gold Hill)	2
4	William M. Stewart (Carson City)	Republican	Mar 4, 1887 – Mar 3, 1905	Re-elected in 1899. Retired.	6	57th	7	Re-elected in 1897. Retired.	Mar 4, 1873 – Mar 3, 1903	Republican	John P. Jones (Gold Hill)	2
4	William M. Stewart (Carson City)	Republican	Mar 4, 1887 – Mar 3, 1905	Re-elected in 1899. Retired.	6	58th	8	Elected in 1903.	Mar 4, 1903 – Dec 24, 1917	Democratic	Francis G. Newlands (Reno)	3
5	George S. Nixon (Reno)	Republican	Mar 4, 1905 – June 5, 1912	Elected in 1905.	7	59th	8	Elected in 1903.	Mar 4, 1903 – Dec 24, 1917	Democratic	Francis G. Newlands (Reno)	3
5	George S. Nixon (Reno)	Republican	Mar 4, 1905 – June 5, 1912	Elected in 1905.	7	60th	8	Elected in 1903.	Mar 4, 1903 – Dec 24, 1917	Democratic	Francis G. Newlands (Reno)	3
5	George S. Nixon (Reno)	Republican	Mar 4, 1905 – June 5, 1912	Elected in 1905.	7	61st	9	Re-elected in 1909.	Mar 4, 1903 – Dec 24, 1917	Democratic	Francis G. Newlands (Reno)	3
5	George S. Nixon (Reno)	Republican	Mar 4, 1905 – June 5, 1912	Re-elected in 1911. Died.	8	62nd	9	Re-elected in 1909.	Mar 4, 1903 – Dec 24, 1917	Democratic	Francis G. Newlands (Reno)	3
Vacant			June 5, 1912 – July 1, 1912		8	62nd	9	Re-elected in 1909.	Mar 4, 1903 – Dec 24, 1917	Democratic	Francis G. Newlands (Reno)	3
6	William A. Massey (Reno)	Republican	July 1, 1912 – Jan 29, 1913	Appointed to continue Nixon's term. Lost election to finish Nixon's term.	8	62nd	9	Re-elected in 1909.	Mar 4, 1903 – Dec 24, 1917	Democratic	Francis G. Newlands (Reno)	3
7	Key Pittman (Tonopah)	Democratic	Jan 29, 1913 – Nov 10, 1940	Elected in 1913 to finish Nixon's term.	8	62nd	9	Re-elected in 1909.	Mar 4, 1903 – Dec 24, 1917	Democratic	Francis G. Newlands (Reno)	3
7	Key Pittman (Tonopah)	Democratic	Jan 29, 1913 – Nov 10, 1940	Elected in 1913 to finish Nixon's term.	8	63rd	9	Re-elected in 1909.	Mar 4, 1903 – Dec 24, 1917	Democratic	Francis G. Newlands (Reno)	3
7	Key Pittman (Tonopah)	Democratic	Jan 29, 1913 – Nov 10, 1940	Elected in 1913 to finish Nixon's term.	8	64th	10	Re-elected in 1914. Died.	Mar 4, 1903 – Dec 24, 1917	Democratic	Francis G. Newlands (Reno)	3
7	Key Pittman (Tonopah)	Democratic	Jan 29, 1913 – Nov 10, 1940	Re-elected in 1916.	9	65th	10	Re-elected in 1914. Died.	Mar 4, 1903 – Dec 24, 1917	Democratic	Francis G. Newlands (Reno)	3
7	Key Pittman (Tonopah)	Democratic	Jan 29, 1913 – Nov 10, 1940	Re-elected in 1916.	9	65th	10		Dec 24, 1917 – Jan 12, 1918	Vacant		
7	Key Pittman (Tonopah)	Democratic	Jan 29, 1913 – Nov 10, 1940	Re-elected in 1916.	9	65th	10	Appointed to continue Newlands's term. Elected in 1918 to finish Newlands's term. Lost election to full term.	Jan 12, 1918 – Mar 3, 1921	Democratic	Charles Henderson (Elko)	4
7	Key Pittman (Tonopah)	Democratic	Jan 29, 1913 – Nov 10, 1940	Re-elected in 1916.	9	66th	10	Appointed to continue Newlands's term. Elected in 1918 to finish Newlands's term. Lost election to full term.	Jan 12, 1918 – Mar 3, 1921	Democratic	Charles Henderson (Elko)	4
7	Key Pittman (Tonopah)	Democratic	Jan 29, 1913 – Nov 10, 1940	Re-elected in 1916.	9	67th	11	Elected in 1920.	Mar 4, 1921 – Mar 3, 1933	Republican	Tasker Oddie (Reno)	5
7	Key Pittman (Tonopah)	Democratic	Jan 29, 1913 – Nov 10, 1940	Re-elected in 1922.	10	68th	11	Elected in 1920.	Mar 4, 1921 – Mar 3, 1933	Republican	Tasker Oddie (Reno)	5
7	Key Pittman (Tonopah)	Democratic	Jan 29, 1913 – Nov 10, 1940	Re-elected in 1922.	10	69th	11	Elected in 1920.	Mar 4, 1921 – Mar 3, 1933	Republican	Tasker Oddie (Reno)	5
7	Key Pittman (Tonopah)	Democratic	Jan 29, 1913 – Nov 10, 1940	Re-elected in 1922.	10	70th	12	Re-elected in 1926. Lost re-election.	Mar 4, 1921 – Mar 3, 1933	Republican	Tasker Oddie (Reno)	5
7	Key Pittman (Tonopah)	Democratic	Jan 29, 1913 – Nov 10, 1940	Re-elected in 1928.	11	71st	12	Re-elected in 1926. Lost re-election.	Mar 4, 1921 – Mar 3, 1933	Republican	Tasker Oddie (Reno)	5
7	Key Pittman (Tonopah)	Democratic	Jan 29, 1913 – Nov 10, 1940	Re-elected in 1928.	11	72nd	12	Re-elected in 1926. Lost re-election.	Mar 4, 1921 – Mar 3, 1933	Republican	Tasker Oddie (Reno)	5
7	Key Pittman (Tonopah)	Democratic	Jan 29, 1913 – Nov 10, 1940	Re-elected in 1928.	11	73rd	13	Elected in 1932.	Mar 4, 1933 – Sep 28, 1954	Democratic	Pat McCarran (Reno)	6
7	Key Pittman (Tonopah)	Democratic	Jan 29, 1913 – Nov 10, 1940	Re-elected in 1934. Died, having been elected to the next term.	12	74th	13	Elected in 1932.	Mar 4, 1933 – Sep 28, 1954	Democratic	Pat McCarran (Reno)	6
7	Key Pittman (Tonopah)	Democratic	Jan 29, 1913 – Nov 10, 1940	Re-elected in 1934. Died, having been elected to the next term.	12	75th	13	Elected in 1932.	Mar 4, 1933 – Sep 28, 1954	Democratic	Pat McCarran (Reno)	6
7	Key Pittman (Tonopah)	Democratic	Jan 29, 1913 – Nov 10, 1940	Re-elected in 1934. Died, having been elected to the next term.	12	76th	14	Re-elected in 1938.	Mar 4, 1933 – Sep 28, 1954	Democratic	Pat McCarran (Reno)	6
Vacant			Nov 10, 1940 – Nov 27, 1940		12	76th	14	Re-elected in 1938.	Mar 4, 1933 – Sep 28, 1954	Democratic	Pat McCarran (Reno)	6
8	Berkeley L. Bunker (Las Vegas)	Democratic	Nov 27, 1940 – Dec 6, 1942	Appointed to finish Pittman's term.	12	76th	14	Re-elected in 1938.	Mar 4, 1933 – Sep 28, 1954	Democratic	Pat McCarran (Reno)	6
8	Berkeley L. Bunker (Las Vegas)	Democratic	Nov 27, 1940 – Dec 6, 1942	Appointed to start Pittman's next term. Lost nomination to finish Pittman's next term.	13	77th	14	Re-elected in 1938.	Mar 4, 1933 – Sep 28, 1954	Democratic	Pat McCarran (Reno)	6
9	James G. Scrugham (Reno)	Democratic	Dec 7, 1942 – Jun 23, 1945	Elected in 1942 to finish Pittman's term. Died.	13	77th	14	Re-elected in 1938.	Mar 4, 1933 – Sep 28, 1954	Democratic	Pat McCarran (Reno)	6
9	James G. Scrugham (Reno)	Democratic	Dec 7, 1942 – Jun 23, 1945	Elected in 1942 to finish Pittman's term. Died.	13	78th	14	Re-elected in 1938.	Mar 4, 1933 – Sep 28, 1954	Democratic	Pat McCarran (Reno)	6
9	James G. Scrugham (Reno)	Democratic	Dec 7, 1942 – Jun 23, 1945	Elected in 1942 to finish Pittman's term. Died.	13	79th	15	Re-elected in 1944.	Mar 4, 1933 – Sep 28, 1954	Democratic	Pat McCarran (Reno)	6
Vacant			Jun 23, 1945 – July 24, 1945		13	79th	15	Re-elected in 1944.	Mar 4, 1933 – Sep 28, 1954	Democratic	Pat McCarran (Reno)	6
10	Edward P. Carville (Reno)	Democratic	July 24, 1945 – Jan 3, 1947	Appointed to finish Pittman's term. Lost nomination to full term.	13	79th	15	Re-elected in 1944.	Mar 4, 1933 – Sep 28, 1954	Democratic	Pat McCarran (Reno)	6
11	George W. Malone (Reno)	Republican	Jan 3, 1947 – Jan 3, 1959	Elected in 1946.	15	80th	15	Re-elected in 1944.	Mar 4, 1933 – Sep 28, 1954	Democratic	Pat McCarran (Reno)	6
11	George W. Malone (Reno)	Republican	Jan 3, 1947 – Jan 3, 1959	Elected in 1946.	15	81st	15	Re-elected in 1944.	Mar 4, 1933 – Sep 28, 1954	Democratic	Pat McCarran (Reno)	6
11	George W. Malone (Reno)	Republican	Jan 3, 1947 – Jan 3, 1959	Elected in 1946.	15	82nd	16	Re-elected in 1950. Died.	Mar 4, 1933 – Sep 28, 1954	Democratic	Pat McCarran (Reno)	6
11	George W. Malone (Reno)	Republican	Jan 3, 1947 – Jan 3, 1959	Re-elected in 1952. Lost re-election.	16	83rd	16	Re-elected in 1950. Died.	Mar 4, 1933 – Sep 28, 1954	Democratic	Pat McCarran (Reno)	6
11	George W. Malone (Reno)	Republican	Jan 3, 1947 – Jan 3, 1959	Re-elected in 1952. Lost re-election.	16	83rd	16		Sep 28, 1954 – Oct 1, 1954	Vacant		
11	George W. Malone (Reno)	Republican	Jan 3, 1947 – Jan 3, 1959	Re-elected in 1952. Lost re-election.	16	83rd	16	Appointed to continue McCarran's term. Lost election to finish McCarran's term.	Oct 1, 1954 – Dec 1, 1954	Republican	Ernest S. Brown (Reno)	7
11	George W. Malone (Reno)	Republican	Jan 3, 1947 – Jan 3, 1959	Re-elected in 1952. Lost re-election.	16	83rd	16	Elected in 1954 to finish McCarran's term.	Dec 2, 1954 – Dec 17, 1974	Democratic	Alan Bible (Reno)	8
11	George W. Malone (Reno)	Republican	Jan 3, 1947 – Jan 3, 1959	Re-elected in 1952. Lost re-election.	16	84th	16	Elected in 1954 to finish McCarran's term.	Dec 2, 1954 – Dec 17, 1974	Democratic	Alan Bible (Reno)	8
11	George W. Malone (Reno)	Republican	Jan 3, 1947 – Jan 3, 1959	Re-elected in 1952. Lost re-election.	16	85th	17	Re-elected in 1956.	Dec 2, 1954 – Dec 17, 1974	Democratic	Alan Bible (Reno)	8
12	Howard Cannon (Las Vegas)	Democratic	Jan 3, 1959 – Jan 3, 1983	Elected in 1958.	17	86th	17	Re-elected in 1956.	Dec 2, 1954 – Dec 17, 1974	Democratic	Alan Bible (Reno)	8
12	Howard Cannon (Las Vegas)	Democratic	Jan 3, 1959 – Jan 3, 1983	Elected in 1958.	17	87th	17	Re-elected in 1956.	Dec 2, 1954 – Dec 17, 1974	Democratic	Alan Bible (Reno)	8
12	Howard Cannon (Las Vegas)	Democratic	Jan 3, 1959 – Jan 3, 1983	Elected in 1958.	17	88th	18	Re-elected in 1962.	Dec 2, 1954 – Dec 17, 1974	Democratic	Alan Bible (Reno)	8
12	Howard Cannon (Las Vegas)	Democratic	Jan 3, 1959 – Jan 3, 1983	Re-elected in 1964.	18	89th	18	Re-elected in 1962.	Dec 2, 1954 – Dec 17, 1974	Democratic	Alan Bible (Reno)	8
12	Howard Cannon (Las Vegas)	Democratic	Jan 3, 1959 – Jan 3, 1983	Re-elected in 1964.	18	90th	18	Re-elected in 1962.	Dec 2, 1954 – Dec 17, 1974	Democratic	Alan Bible (Reno)	8
12	Howard Cannon (Las Vegas)	Democratic	Jan 3, 1959 – Jan 3, 1983	Re-elected in 1964.	18	91st	19	Re-elected in 1968. Retired, then resigned early to give successor preferential seniority.	Dec 2, 1954 – Dec 17, 1974	Democratic	Alan Bible (Reno)	8
12	Howard Cannon (Las Vegas)	Democratic	Jan 3, 1959 – Jan 3, 1983	Re-elected in 1970.	19	92nd	19	Re-elected in 1968. Retired, then resigned early to give successor preferential seniority.	Dec 2, 1954 – Dec 17, 1974	Democratic	Alan Bible (Reno)	8
12	Howard Cannon (Las Vegas)	Democratic	Jan 3, 1959 – Jan 3, 1983	Re-elected in 1970.	19	93rd	19	Re-elected in 1968. Retired, then resigned early to give successor preferential seniority.	Dec 2, 1954 – Dec 17, 1974	Democratic	Alan Bible (Reno)	8
12	Howard Cannon (Las Vegas)	Democratic	Jan 3, 1959 – Jan 3, 1983	Re-elected in 1970.	19	93rd	19	Appointed to finish Bible's term, having already been elected to the next term.	Dec 18, 1974 – Jan 3, 1987	Republican	Paul Laxalt (Carson City)	9
12	Howard Cannon (Las Vegas)	Democratic	Jan 3, 1959 – Jan 3, 1983	Re-elected in 1970.	19	94th	20	Elected in 1974.	Dec 18, 1974 – Jan 3, 1987	Republican	Paul Laxalt (Carson City)	9
12	Howard Cannon (Las Vegas)	Democratic	Jan 3, 1959 – Jan 3, 1983	Re-elected in 1976. Lost re-election.	20	95th	20	Elected in 1974.	Dec 18, 1974 – Jan 3, 1987	Republican	Paul Laxalt (Carson City)	9
12	Howard Cannon (Las Vegas)	Democratic	Jan 3, 1959 – Jan 3, 1983	Re-elected in 1976. Lost re-election.	20	96th	20	Elected in 1974.	Dec 18, 1974 – Jan 3, 1987	Republican	Paul Laxalt (Carson City)	9
12	Howard Cannon (Las Vegas)	Democratic	Jan 3, 1959 – Jan 3, 1983	Re-elected in 1976. Lost re-election.	20	97th	21	Re-elected in 1980. Retired.	Dec 18, 1974 – Jan 3, 1987	Republican	Paul Laxalt (Carson City)	9
13	Chic Hecht (Las Vegas)	Republican	Jan 3, 1983 – Jan 3, 1989	Elected in 1982. Lost re-election.	21	98th	21	Re-elected in 1980. Retired.	Dec 18, 1974 – Jan 3, 1987	Republican	Paul Laxalt (Carson City)	9
13	Chic Hecht (Las Vegas)	Republican	Jan 3, 1983 – Jan 3, 1989	Elected in 1982. Lost re-election.	21	99th	21	Re-elected in 1980. Retired.	Dec 18, 1974 – Jan 3, 1987	Republican	Paul Laxalt (Carson City)	9
13	Chic Hecht (Las Vegas)	Republican	Jan 3, 1983 – Jan 3, 1989	Elected in 1982. Lost re-election.	21	100th	22	Elected in 1986.	Jan 3, 1987 – Jan 3, 2017	Democratic	Harry Reid (Searchlight)	10
14	Richard Bryan (Las Vegas)	Democratic	Jan 3, 1989 – Jan 3, 2001	Elected in 1988.	22	101st	22	Elected in 1986.	Jan 3, 1987 – Jan 3, 2017	Democratic	Harry Reid (Searchlight)	10
14	Richard Bryan (Las Vegas)	Democratic	Jan 3, 1989 – Jan 3, 2001	Elected in 1988.	22	102nd	22	Elected in 1986.	Jan 3, 1987 – Jan 3, 2017	Democratic	Harry Reid (Searchlight)	10
14	Richard Bryan (Las Vegas)	Democratic	Jan 3, 1989 – Jan 3, 2001	Elected in 1988.	22	103rd	23	Re-elected in 1992.	Jan 3, 1987 – Jan 3, 2017	Democratic	Harry Reid (Searchlight)	10
14	Richard Bryan (Las Vegas)	Democratic	Jan 3, 1989 – Jan 3, 2001	Re-elected in 1994. Retired.	23	104th	23	Re-elected in 1992.	Jan 3, 1987 – Jan 3, 2017	Democratic	Harry Reid (Searchlight)	10
14	Richard Bryan (Las Vegas)	Democratic	Jan 3, 1989 – Jan 3, 2001	Re-elected in 1994. Retired.	23	105th	23	Re-elected in 1992.	Jan 3, 1987 – Jan 3, 2017	Democratic	Harry Reid (Searchlight)	10
14	Richard Bryan (Las Vegas)	Democratic	Jan 3, 1989 – Jan 3, 2001	Re-elected in 1994. Retired.	23	106th	24	Re-elected in 1998.	Jan 3, 1987 – Jan 3, 2017	Democratic	Harry Reid (Searchlight)	10
15	John Ensign (Las Vegas)	Republican	Jan 3, 2001 – May 3, 2011	Elected in 2000.	24	107th	24	Re-elected in 1998.	Jan 3, 1987 – Jan 3, 2017	Democratic	Harry Reid (Searchlight)	10
15	John Ensign (Las Vegas)	Republican	Jan 3, 2001 – May 3, 2011	Elected in 2000.	24	108th	24	Re-elected in 1998.	Jan 3, 1987 – Jan 3, 2017	Democratic	Harry Reid (Searchlight)	10
15	John Ensign (Las Vegas)	Republican	Jan 3, 2001 – May 3, 2011	Elected in 2000.	24	109th	25	Re-elected in 2004.	Jan 3, 1987 – Jan 3, 2017	Democratic	Harry Reid (Searchlight)	10
15	John Ensign (Las Vegas)	Republican	Jan 3, 2001 – May 3, 2011	Re-elected in 2006. Resigned.	25	110th	25	Re-elected in 2004.	Jan 3, 1987 – Jan 3, 2017	Democratic	Harry Reid (Searchlight)	10
15	John Ensign (Las Vegas)	Republican	Jan 3, 2001 – May 3, 2011	Re-elected in 2006. Resigned.	25	111th	25	Re-elected in 2004.	Jan 3, 1987 – Jan 3, 2017	Democratic	Harry Reid (Searchlight)	10
15	John Ensign (Las Vegas)	Republican	Jan 3, 2001 – May 3, 2011	Re-elected in 2006. Resigned.	25	112th	26	Re-elected in 2010. Retired.	Jan 3, 1987 – Jan 3, 2017	Democratic	Harry Reid (Searchlight)	10
Vacant			May 3, 2011 – May 9, 2011		25	112th	26	Re-elected in 2010. Retired.	Jan 3, 1987 – Jan 3, 2017	Democratic	Harry Reid (Searchlight)	10
16	Dean Heller (Carson City)	Republican	May 9, 2011 – Jan 3, 2019	Appointed to finish Ensign's term.	25	112th	26	Re-elected in 2010. Retired.	Jan 3, 1987 – Jan 3, 2017	Democratic	Harry Reid (Searchlight)	10
16	Dean Heller (Carson City)	Republican	May 9, 2011 – Jan 3, 2019	Elected in 2012 to a full term. Lost re-election.	26	113th	26	Re-elected in 2010. Retired.	Jan 3, 1987 – Jan 3, 2017	Democratic	Harry Reid (Searchlight)	10
16	Dean Heller (Carson City)	Republican	May 9, 2011 – Jan 3, 2019	Elected in 2012 to a full term. Lost re-election.	26	114th	26	Re-elected in 2010. Retired.	Jan 3, 1987 – Jan 3, 2017	Democratic	Harry Reid (Searchlight)	10
16	Dean Heller (Carson City)	Republican	May 9, 2011 – Jan 3, 2019	Elected in 2012 to a full term. Lost re-election.	26	115th	27	Elected in 2016.	Jan 3, 2017 – present	Democratic	Catherine Cortez Masto (Las Vegas)	11
17	Jacky Rosen (Henderson)	Democratic	Jan 3, 2019 – present	Elected in 2018.	27	116th	27	Elected in 2016.	Jan 3, 2017 – present	Democratic	Catherine Cortez Masto (Las Vegas)	11
17	Jacky Rosen (Henderson)	Democratic	Jan 3, 2019 – present	Elected in 2018.	27	117th	27	Elected in 2016.	Jan 3, 2017 – present	Democratic	Catherine Cortez Masto (Las Vegas)	11
17	Jacky Rosen (Henderson)	Democratic	Jan 3, 2019 – present	Elected in 2018.	27	118th	28	Re-elected in 2022.	Jan 3, 2017 – present	Democratic	Catherine Cortez Masto (Las Vegas)	11
17	Jacky Rosen (Henderson)	Democratic	Jan 3, 2019 – present	Re-elected in 2024.	28	119th	28	Re-elected in 2022.	Jan 3, 2017 – present	Democratic	Catherine Cortez Masto (Las Vegas)	11
17	Jacky Rosen (Henderson)	Democratic	Jan 3, 2019 – present	Re-elected in 2024.	28	120th	28	Re-elected in 2022.	Jan 3, 2017 – present	Democratic	Catherine Cortez Masto (Las Vegas)	11
17	Jacky Rosen (Henderson)	Democratic	Jan 3, 2019 – present	Re-elected in 2024.	28	121st	29	To be determined in the 2028 election.				
To be determined in the 2030 election.					29	122nd	29	To be determined in the 2028 election.				

== See also ==
- Elections in Nevada
- List of United States representatives from Nevada
- Nevada's congressional delegations
