= Howard Cannon =

American politician (1912–2002)

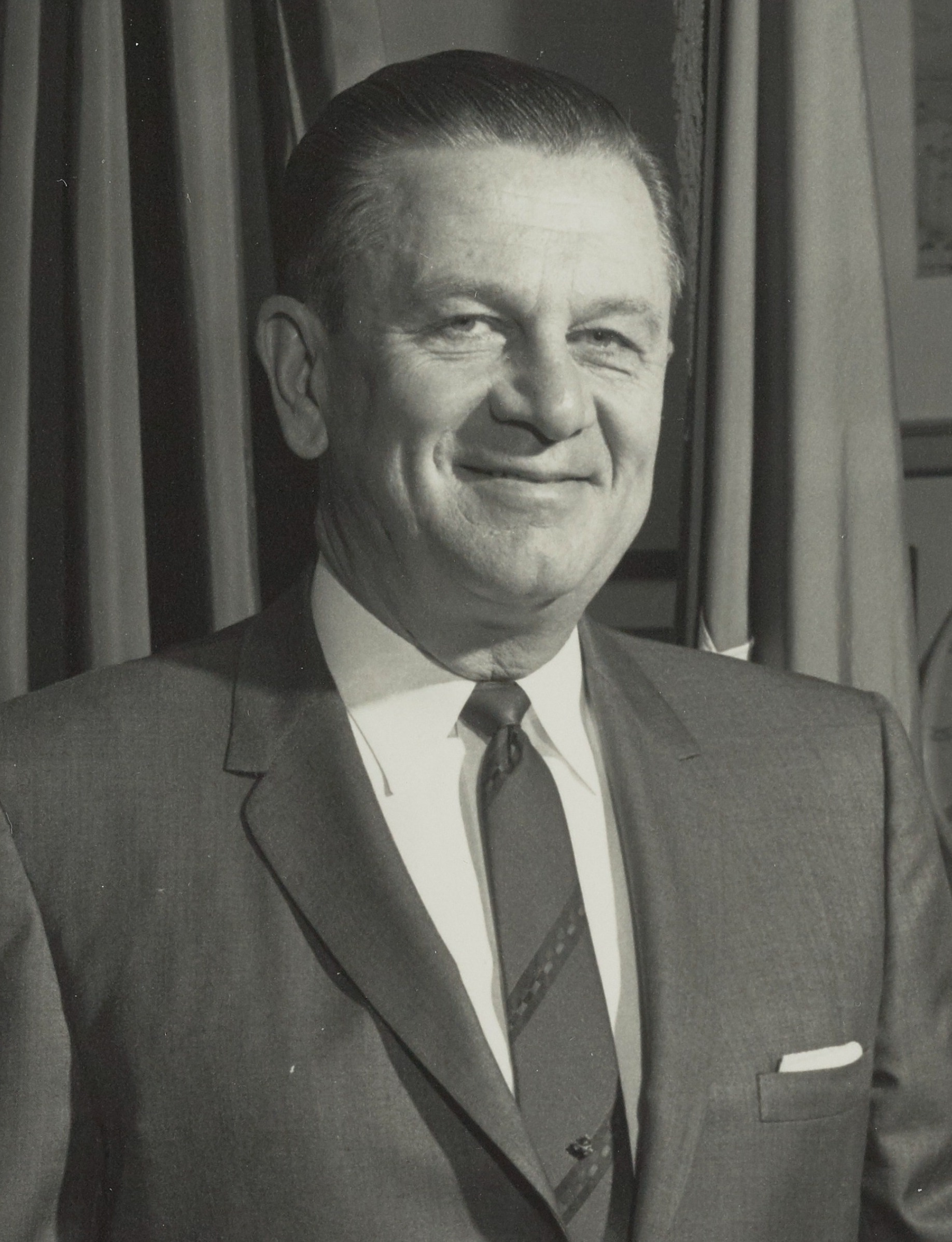
- Cannon while serving, c. 1962

United States Senator from Nevada
- In office January 3, 1959 – January 3, 1983
- Preceded by: George W. Malone
- Succeeded by: Chic Hecht

Chair of the Senate Commerce Committee
- In office January 3, 1978 – January 3, 1981
- Preceded by: Warren Magnuson
- Succeeded by: Bob Packwood

Chair of the Senate Rules Committee
- In office January 3, 1973 – January 3, 1978
- Preceded by: B. Everett Jordan
- Succeeded by: Claiborne Pell

Personal details
- Born: Howard Walter Cannon; January 26, 1912 St. George, Utah, U.S.
- Died: March 5, 2002 (aged 90) Las Vegas, Nevada, U.S.
- Resting place: Arlington National Cemetery
- Party: Democratic
- Spouse: Dorothy Pace (m. 1945)
- Children: 2
- Relatives: Cannon family
- Profession: Attorney

Military service
- Allegiance: United States
- Branch/service: United States Army
- Years of service: 1941–1946 (active); 1946–1947 (reserve)
- Rank: Lieutenant colonel
- Battles/wars: World War II
- Awards: Silver Star; Legion of Merit; Distinguished Flying Cross; Purple Heart; Air Medal

Howard Walter Cannon (January 26, 1912 – March 5, 2002) was an American politician from the U.S. state of Nevada. A member of the Democratic Party, he served four terms in the United States Senate representing Nevada from 1959 to 1983.

Born in St. George, Utah, Cannon graduated from Northern Arizona University and the University of Arizona Law School. In 1940, Cannon won his first election as county attorney for Washington County, Utah. The following year with the start of World War II, Cannon served in the United States Army for a year and then in the United States Army Air Corps from 1942 to 1946, rising to the rank of lieutenant colonel. Cannon later served in the Army Air Forces Air Reserve as a major general.

In 1949, Cannon returned to politics, winning election as city attorney for Las Vegas, Nevada. After four consecutive terms in that office, Cannon defeated Republican incumbent U.S. Senator George W. Malone in the 1958 election. As senator, Cannon chaired multiple committees, including the Committee on Commerce, Science, and Transportation and the Committee on Rules and Administration. Cannon also sponsored the Airline Deregulation Act, a bill signed into law by President Jimmy Carter in 1978 that lowered airfares through deregulation of the airline industry.

Cannon's final Senate term was mired in a scandal after the revelation of a 1979 meeting with Teamsters union president Roy Lee Williams where Cannon was offered a bribe to block the Motor Carrier Act of 1980. The scandal contributed to Cannon losing re-election in 1982 to Republican challenger Chic Hecht. After leaving the Senate, Cannon remained in Washington as an aviation and defense consultant for nearly a decade before retiring to Las Vegas in the mid-1990s.

== Early life and education ==
Cannon was born in St. George, Utah. His grandfather, David Cannon, was the younger brother of George Q. Cannon and a leading figure in the building of the St. George Temple, who was later the third president of that temple. His father Walter Cannon was one of David Cannon's 31 children. Howard's parents Walter Cannon and Leah Sullivan married in 1909. When Cannon was two years old his father left for England to serve a mission for the Church of Jesus Christ of Latter-day Saints for two years.

Cannon went to Woodward School in St. George, close enough to his home he could walk home for lunch. He then went to Dixie High School. During summers, he worked as a bell hop at the North Rim Lodge along the Grand Canyon. In the evenings he would form a small band where he used his skills as a saxophonist to entertain guests. He delivered copies of the Deseret News around St. George on horseback.

He graduated from Dixie Junior College (now Utah Tech University) and received a bachelor's degree in music education from Arizona State Teachers College (now Northern Arizona University) in 1933. He then received an LL.B. from the University of Arizona Law School in 1937. While studying at the University of Arizona he was the director of the university pep orchestra. Between the summer of his second and third year he directed this group at a hotel in Seattle, Washington. In the summer of 1936 after his graduation he directed an orchestra of four, performing on the SS Jefferson on a cruise from Seattle, Washington, to Yokohama, Japan. Also during his law school years Cannon competed in rodeos and learned to be an airplane pilot.

Also in the summer of 1936, Cannon began dating Dorothy Pace of Alamo, Nevada. They married on December 21, 1945.

After he finished law school he returned to St. George. Among his actions on his return was buying a house adjacent to Dixie College as an investment property.

== Legal career ==
Cannon became a lawyer after passing the bar exams in Arizona (1937), Utah (1938) and Nevada (1946). He served as a reference and research attorney for the Utah State Senate in 1939, and won election as county attorney of Washington County, Utah in 1940.

In 1946 Cannon established law offices in Las Vegas. In 1949 he was elected Las Vegas City Attorney, and he served four consecutive terms.

== Military service ==
During World War II, Cannon served as a troop carrier pilot in the United States Army Air Corps and its subsequent incarnation as the United States Army Air Forces. Assigned to the European theater, he dropped paratroopers at Saint-Come-du-Mont, Normandy and during the following combat mission in September 1944 was shot down over the Netherlands. He spent 42 days trying to return to the Allied lines with the assistance of the Dutch underground. Released from active duty in 1946, he joined the Army Air Forces Reserve until 1947 when he transitioned to the Air Force Reserve concurrent with the establishment of the U.S. Air Force as a separate service. Continuing to fly in the Air Force Reserve, he achieved command pilot status and ultimately retired from the Air Force Reserve with the rank of major general. His military decorations included the Silver Star, Legion of Merit, Distinguished Flying Cross, the Purple Heart and the Air Medal (three awards).

== U.S. Senate ==
=== Elections ===
In 1956, Cannon ran for the U.S. House of Representatives to succeed Republican incumbent C. Clifton Young, who ran for the U.S. Senate, but lost the Democratic primary to former Congressman Walter Baring, who then won the general election. In 1958, he was elected to the United States senate, unseating Republican Senator George W. Malone with 58% of the vote. Cannon was nearly defeated in his first re-election bid in 1964, holding off Republican Lieutenant Governor Paul Laxalt in one of the closest Senate elections ever. On election night, one of the networks actually projected that Cannon had lost, but several precincts did not report in until the next morning and gave Cannon enough votes to secure a second term. Ultimately, Cannon only won by 48 votes. He likely would have lost without Lyndon Johnson's presence atop the ticket. Johnson easily carried the state as part of his 44-state landslide that year. Cannon was re-elected with far less difficulty in 1970 by defeating Washoe County District Attorney William Raggio. He also won re-election easily over former Representative David Towell in 1976.

In the early 1980s, Cannon was ensnared in a scandal when Teamsters President Roy Lee Williams was indicted by federal prosecutors for attempting to bribe Cannon in exchange for using his influence to block the Motor Carrier Act of 1980, a bill deregulating the trucking industry. He testified that he did not know Williams or his associates and denied being offered a bribe, but other witnesses corroborated the story, and Williams was convicted. Cannon was challenged in the 1982 Democratic primary by U.S. Representative Jim Santini yet won by about 4,500 votes but lost the general election to Republican nominee Chic Hecht, a former state senator and businessman.

=== Tenure ===
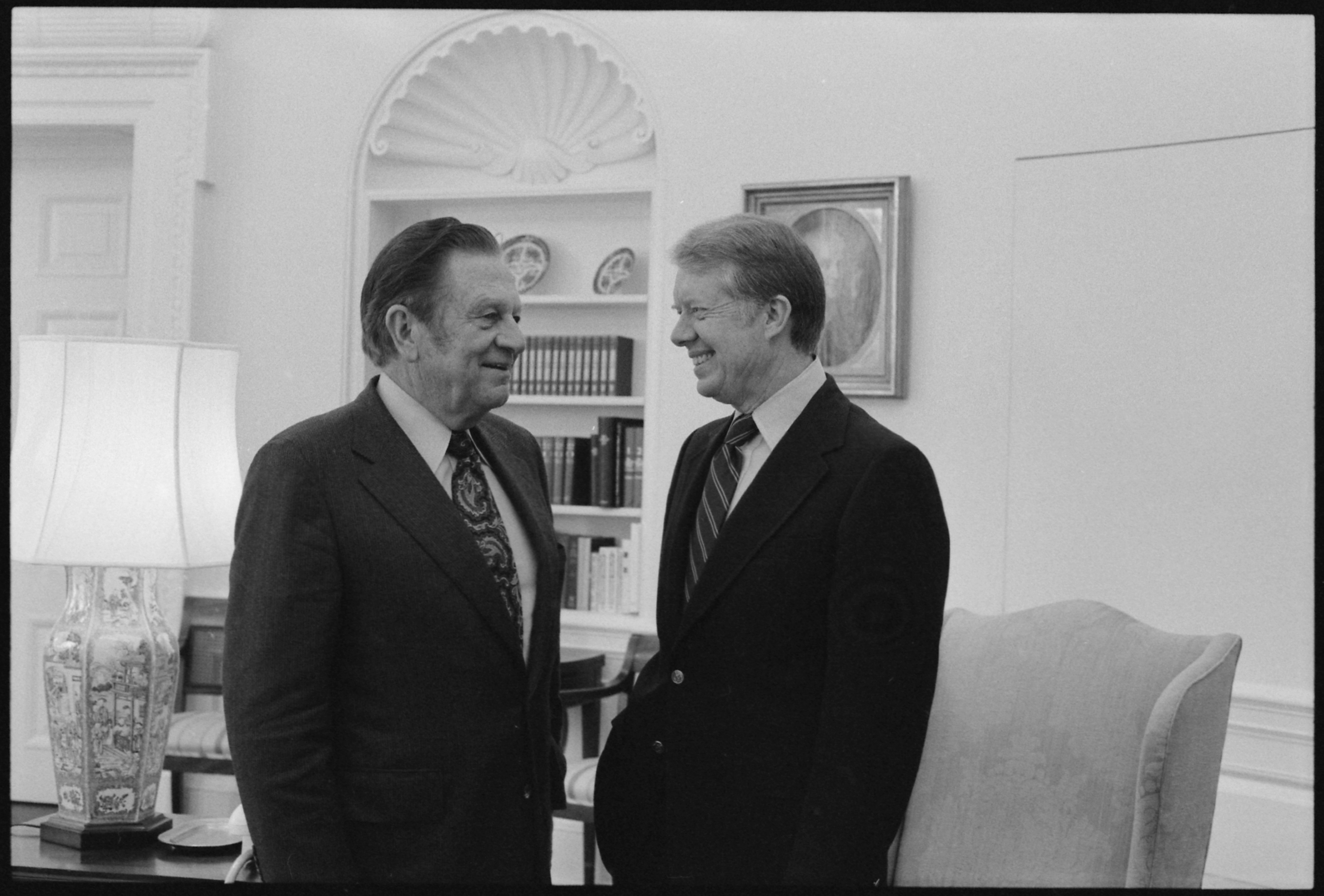
Senator Cannon meets with President Jimmy Carter, c. 1978

Cannon voted for the Civil Rights Act of 1964. He also helped increase funding for Nellis Air Force Base, turning Nellis into one of the most important military facilities worldwide. Cannon also introduced the Airline Deregulation Act, a bill signed in 1978 by President Jimmy Carter that stopped the federal government from regulating airfare and airline routes. Deregulation led to lower air fares and contributed to the growth of Las Vegas as a tourist destination.

A Govtrack analysis of his votes from 1977 to 1982 rates Cannon as a moderate. Americans for Democratic Action, an organization that has long issued 100-point "Liberal Quotient" scores to members of Congress, rated Cannon a 69 in 1965, 41 in 1971, 30 in 1977, and 50 in 1982. The American Conservative Union (ACU) often rated Cannon as unfavorable to conservative causes in its 100-point scale, such as 20 in 1972 and 29 in 1981. However, the ACU scored more Cannon favorably in some years: 50 in 1971, 100 in 1978, and 59 in 1982.

In 1981, he won the Tony Jannus Award for his distinguished contributions to commercial aviation.

In 1980 he took a familiarisation ride in the SR71 Blackbird. (http://www.sr71.us/pg011.htm)

=== Committee assignments ===
He had an interest in the rules and administration of the Congress, serving as chairman of several committees on that subject, including the Joint Committee on Inaugural Ceremonies and Committee on Rules and Administration. He chaired the Committee on Commerce, Science, and Transportation from 1978 to 1981.

== Post-political life ==
After leaving Congress in 1983, Cannon remained in Washington as a defense and aviation consultant for 11 years.

On February 2, 1988, President Ronald Reagan nominated Cannon to the inaugural Board of Trustees of the Goldwater Scholarship program. The U.S. Senate confirmed Cannon by unanimous consent on March 3, 1988.

On March 5, 2002, Cannon died at age 90 in a Las Vegas hospice due to congestive heart failure; he was previously diagnosed with Alzheimer's disease.

== Honors ==
- The passenger terminal at Reno-Tahoe International Airport is named after him.
- The Cannon Center for Survey Research is named after him.
- The Howard W. Cannon Aviation Museum, located in Las Vegas's McCarran International Airport, is also named after him.

Party political offices
Preceded by Thomas B. Mechling	Democratic nominee for U.S. Senator from Nevada (Class 1); 1958, 1964, 1970, 1976, 1982	Succeeded by Richard Bryan
U.S. Senate
Preceded by George W. Malone	U.S. senator (Class 1) from Nevada; 1959–1983; Served alongside: Alan Bible, Paul Laxalt	Succeeded by Chic Hecht
Preceded by B. Everett Jordan	Chair of the Senate Rules Committee; 1973–1978	Succeeded by Claiborne Pell
Preceded by Warren Magnuson	Chair of the Senate Commerce Committee; 1978–1981	Succeeded by Bob Packwood
Preceded by Bob Packwood	Ranking Member of the Senate Commerce Committee; 1981–1983	Succeeded by Fritz Hollings
