= James G. Scrugham =

American politician (1880–1945)

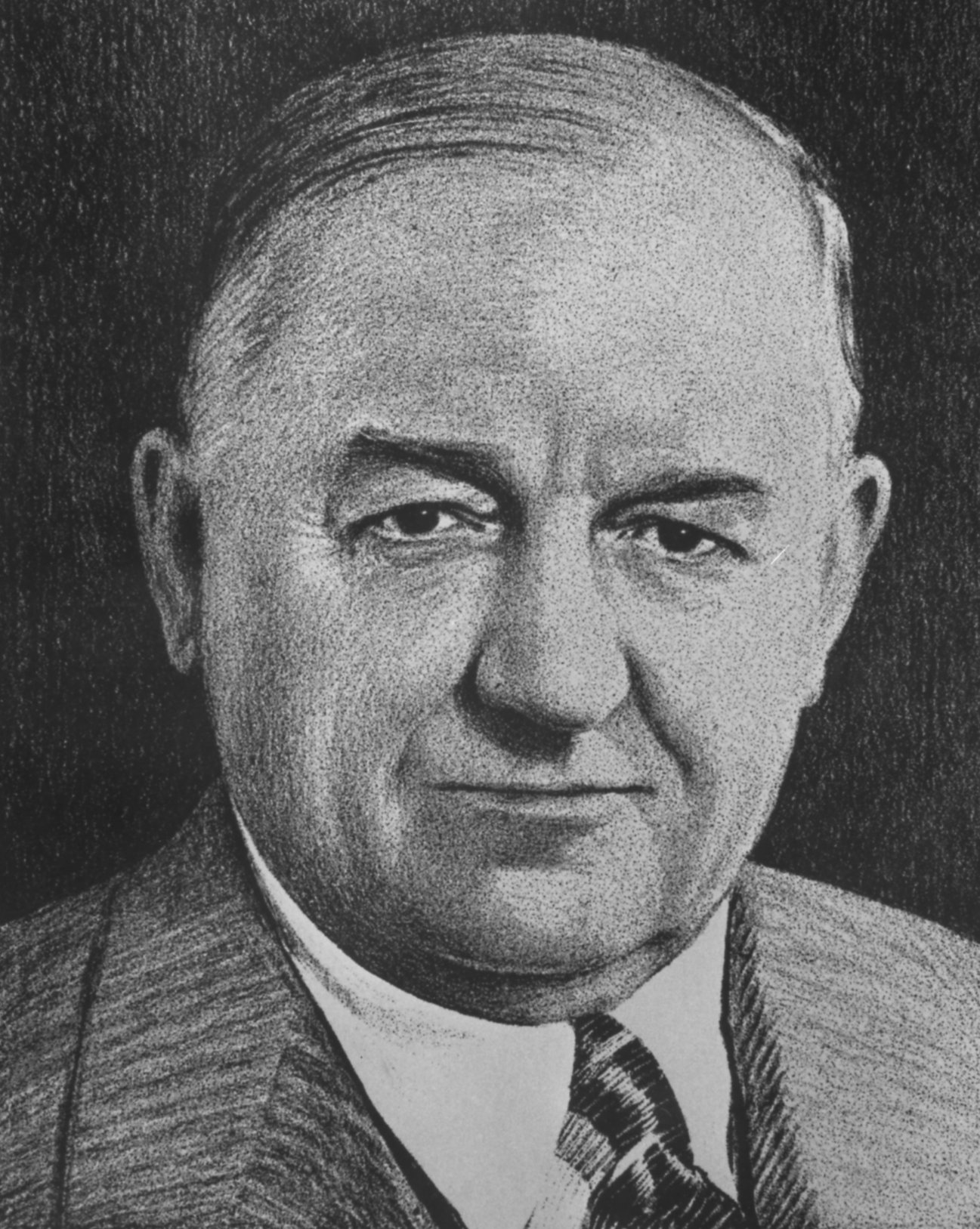

United States Senator from Nevada
- In office December 7, 1942 – June 23, 1945
- Preceded by: Berkeley L. Bunker
- Succeeded by: Edward P. Carville

Member of the U.S. House of Representatives from Nevada's at-large district
- In office March 4, 1933 – December 7, 1942
- Preceded by: Samuel S. Arentz
- Succeeded by: Maurice J. Sullivan

14th Governor of Nevada
- In office January 1, 1923 – January 3, 1927
- Lieutenant: Maurice J. Sullivan
- Preceded by: Emmet D. Boyle
- Succeeded by: Fred B. Balzar

Personal details
- Born: James Graves Scrugham; January 19, 1880 Lexington, Kentucky, U.S.
- Died: June 23, 1945 (aged 65) San Diego, California, U.S.
- Resting place: Masonic Memorial Gardens; Reno, Nevada, U.S.
- Party: Democratic
- Spouse: Julia W. McCann
- Children: 3
- Profession: Professor

James Graves Scrugham (January 19, 1880 – June 23, 1945) was an American politician. A member of the Democratic Party, he served as a United States representative and a United States senator, and was the 14th governor of the U.S. state of Nevada.

== Early life ==
Scrugham was born in Lexington, Kentucky, on January 19, 1880. He graduated from the University of Kentucky at Lexington in 1900, and received his master's degree in 1906. He was a professor of mechanical engineering at the University of Nevada (now the University of Nevada, Reno) from 1903 to 1914, and was dean of the school of engineering from 1913 to 1917.

== Early career ==
During the First World War, Scrugham was commissioned as a major in the United States Army in 1917 and was promoted to the rank of lieutenant colonel in 1918. After the war, he remained in the military as a member of the Organized Reserve Corps. He was state public service commissioner from 1919 to 1923.

== Governor of Nevada ==
Scrugham was elected Governor of Nevada in 1922, serving from January 1, 1923, to January 3, 1927. He sought re-election in 1926, but was defeated by Republican Fred B. Balzar.

Scrugham was the editor and publisher of the Nevada State Journal from 1927 to 1932. He became a special adviser to the Secretary of the Interior on Colorado River development projects in 1927.

== Service in Congress and death ==
In 1932, Scrugham was elected to the United States House of Representatives. Elected to five terms in the House, he served from 1933 until December 7, 1942, when he resigned, having been elected to the United States Senate to fill the unexpired term of Key Pittman on November 3, 1942. Scrugham served from December 7, 1942, until his death on June 23, 1945, in San Diego, California, at the age of 65.

At the University of Nevada, Reno, the James G. Scrugham Engineering & Mines Building, opened in 1963, houses the dean's office and several departments in the College of Engineering, as well as the Nevada Bureau of Mines and Geology.

== See also ==
- List of members of the United States Congress who died in office (1900–1949)

Party political offices
| Preceded by Emmet D. Boyle | Democratic nominee for Governor of Nevada; 1922, 1926 | Succeeded by Charles L. Richards |
| Preceded by Key Pittman | Democratic nominee for U.S. Senator from Nevada (Class 1); 1942 | Succeeded by Berkeley L. Bunker |
Political offices
| Preceded by Emmet D. Boyle | Governor of Nevada; January 1, 1923 – January 3, 1927 | Succeeded by Fred B. Balzar |
U.S. House of Representatives
| Preceded by Samuel S. Arentz | Member of the U.S. House of Representatives from Nevada's at-large congressional district March 4, 1933 – December 7, 1942 | Succeeded by Maurice J. Sullivan |
U.S. Senate
| Preceded by Berkeley L. Bunker | U.S. senator (Class 1) from Nevada; December 7, 1942 – June 23, 1945; Served alongside: Pat McCarran | Succeeded by Edward P. Carville |
