= Berkeley L. Bunker =

American politician (1906–1999)

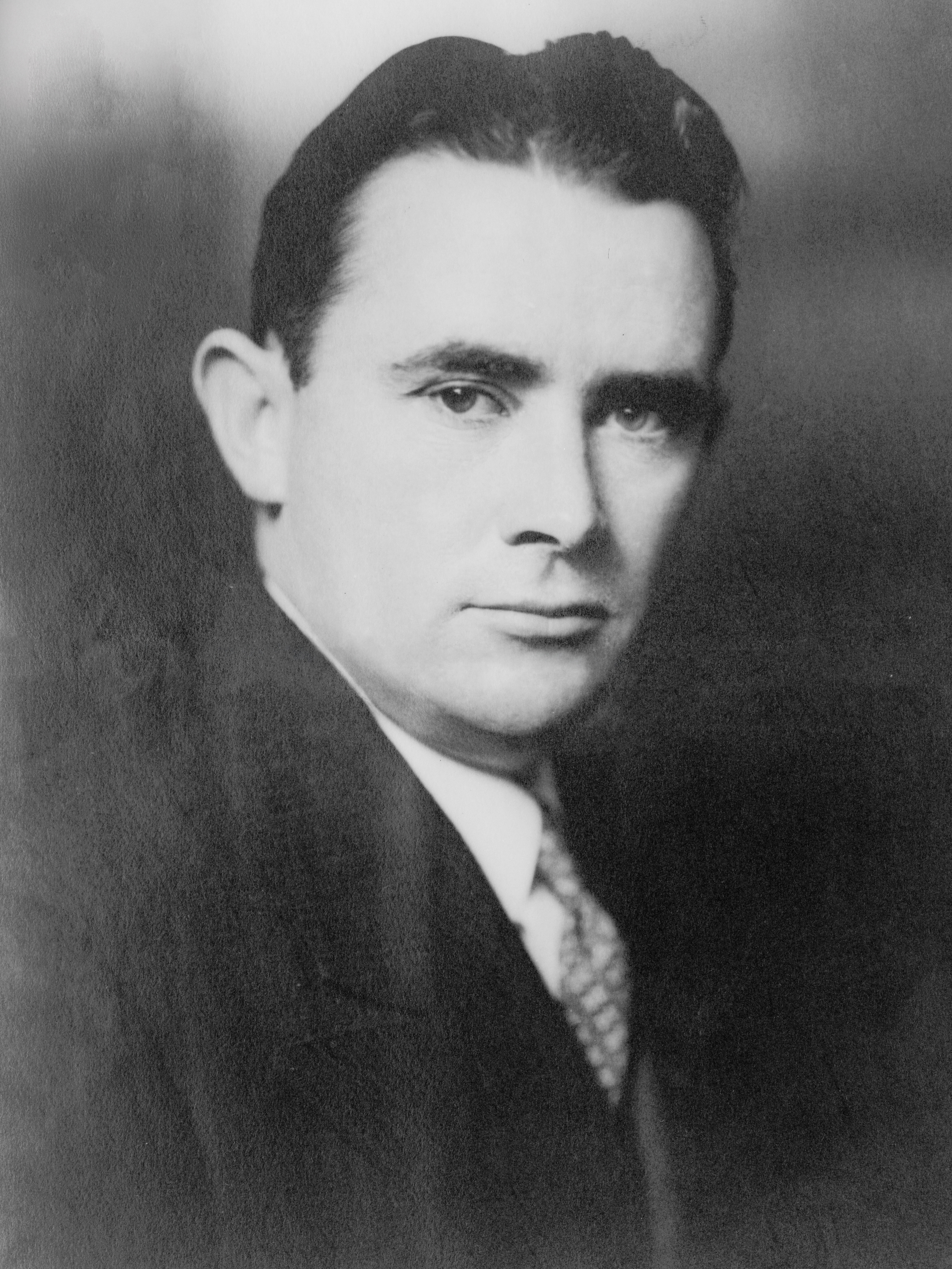
- Bunker c. 1941

United States Senator from Nevada
- In office November 27, 1940 – December 6, 1942
- Appointed by: Edward P. Carville
- Preceded by: Key Pittman
- Succeeded by: James G. Scrugham

Member of the U.S. House of Representatives from Nevada's at-large district
- In office January 3, 1945 – January 3, 1947
- Preceded by: Maurice J. Sullivan
- Succeeded by: Charles H. Russell

Member of the Nevada State Assembly
- In office 1936–1941

Personal details
- Born: Berkeley Lloyd Bunker; August 12, 1906 St. Thomas, Nevada, U.S.
- Died: January 21, 1999 (aged 92) Las Vegas, Nevada, U.S.
- Resting place: Eden Vale Cemetery
- Party: Democratic
- Spouse: Lucile Whitehead
- Profession: Insurance

Berkeley Lloyd Bunker (August 12, 1906 – January 21, 1999) was an American businessman and politician who served as both an appointed United States senator and one-term member of the U.S. House of Representatives from Nevada in the mid-20th century.

== Early life ==
Born in what was then St. Thomas, Clark County, Nevada (now a northern arm of Lake Mead), he attended public schools, graduating from Clark County High School in 1926. Bunker married Lucile Whitehead, then entered the tire and oil business in Las Vegas in 1934.

== Political career ==
=== State legislature ===
The Democrat Bunker was a member of the Nevada Assembly from 1936 to 1941, serving as speaker in 1939.

=== U.S. Senate ===
When United States Senator Key Pittman died just after reelection in 1940, many candidates sought to be appointed as replacement. On November 26, Governor Edward P. Carville surprised the state and appointed Bunker as Pittman's replacement for the term ending January 3, 1941, and also for the term ending January 3, 1947, serving until December 6, 1942, when a duly elected successor qualified.

The young new senator, whom Carville likely chose as a compromise candidate because (as an observer later said) "Nobody was mad at Berkeley Bunker", later claimed to be the "most surprised man in the state" as he had not asked for the job. Bunker was the first southern Nevadan, and first Nevadan Mormon, to serve in federal office.

As a senator he made headlines by accusing Basic Magnesium of having negotiated a contract with the government to get exorbitant profits.

Bunker lost to former governor James Scrugham in the Democratic primary for the 1942 special election.

=== U.S. House ===
He was elected in 1944 as a Democrat to Nevada's only House seat after he had defeated incumbent Maurice Sullivan in the primary and Republican former actor Rex Bell in the general election.

In 1946 he introduced a bill to incorporate Boulder City, Nevada, removing it from federal control, but the bill never made it out of committee.

=== Run for U.S. Senate ===
When Scrugham died in 1945 Carville resigned so that Lieutenant Governor Vail Pittman would succeed him and appoint him to the vacancy. In what he later called "the biggest mistake of my political career", instead of running for reelection to the House, Bunker challenged Carville in the Democratic primary for the 1946 election. Bunker won, but according to fellow Democrats, he had committed what the Las Vegas Review-Journal later described as the "heinous crime of political ingratitude, becoming a party pariah." Observers expected Bunker to easily defeat Republican George Malone, but the Democratic vote was divided and Malone won.

== Later career ==
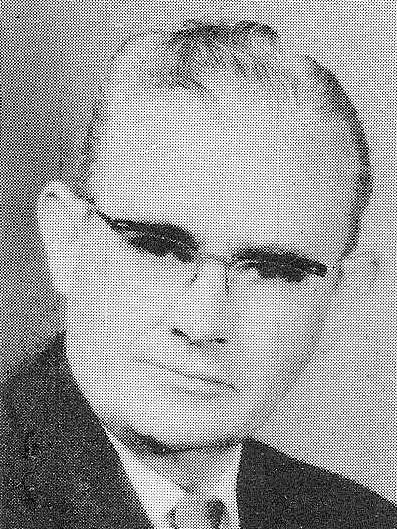
Bunker during his lieutenant gubernatorial campaign in 1962.

Bunker became a hotel manager and then joined his brother in founding the Bunker Brothers mortuary. Bunker ran for lieutenant governor in 1962 but lost to Republican Paul Laxalt, in part because former Carville supporters still resented his defeat of their candidate in 1946.

== Death ==
His wife Lucile Bunker died in 1988. He soon married Della Lee in 1989. Bunker died in 1999 and was interred in Bunker's Eden Vale Cemetery. He was the last living senator who was serving at the time of the United States' declaration of war on Japan, which precipitated the United States' participation in World War II, and was the last living person who had served as a senator during the time FDR was president. Berkeley L. Bunker Elementary School in Las Vegas is named after him.

== Personal life ==
Bunker was a member of the Church of Jesus Christ of Latter-day Saints. He served a mission for the church in the southern United States after high school and before his marriage. After his time in the Senate, Bunker served as bishop of a LDS ward in Las Vegas, and was involved with the building of the Las Vegas Nevada Temple.

Party political offices
Preceded by James G. Scrugham	Democratic nominee for U.S. senator from Nevada (Class 1); 1946	Succeeded by Thomas B. Mechling
U.S. Senate
Preceded by Key Pittman	U.S. senator (Class 1) from Nevada; November 27, 1940 – December 6, 1942; Served alongside: Pat McCarran	Succeeded by James G. Scrugham
U.S. House of Representatives
Preceded by Maurice J. Sullivan	Member of the U.S. House of Representatives from Nevada's at-large congressional district January 3, 1945 – January 3, 1947	Succeeded by Charles H. Russell
Honorary titles
Preceded by Joseph H. Ball; Minnesota	Most senior living U.S. senator (Sitting or former); December 18, 1993 – January 21, 1999	Succeeded by Russell B. Long; Louisiana
Preceded by Joseph H. Ball; Minnesota	Youngest member of the United States Senate; December 12, 1940 – December 6, 1942	Succeeded by Henry Cabot Lodge Jr. Massachusetts
