= 1928 United States Senate election in Nevada =

- November 6, 1928
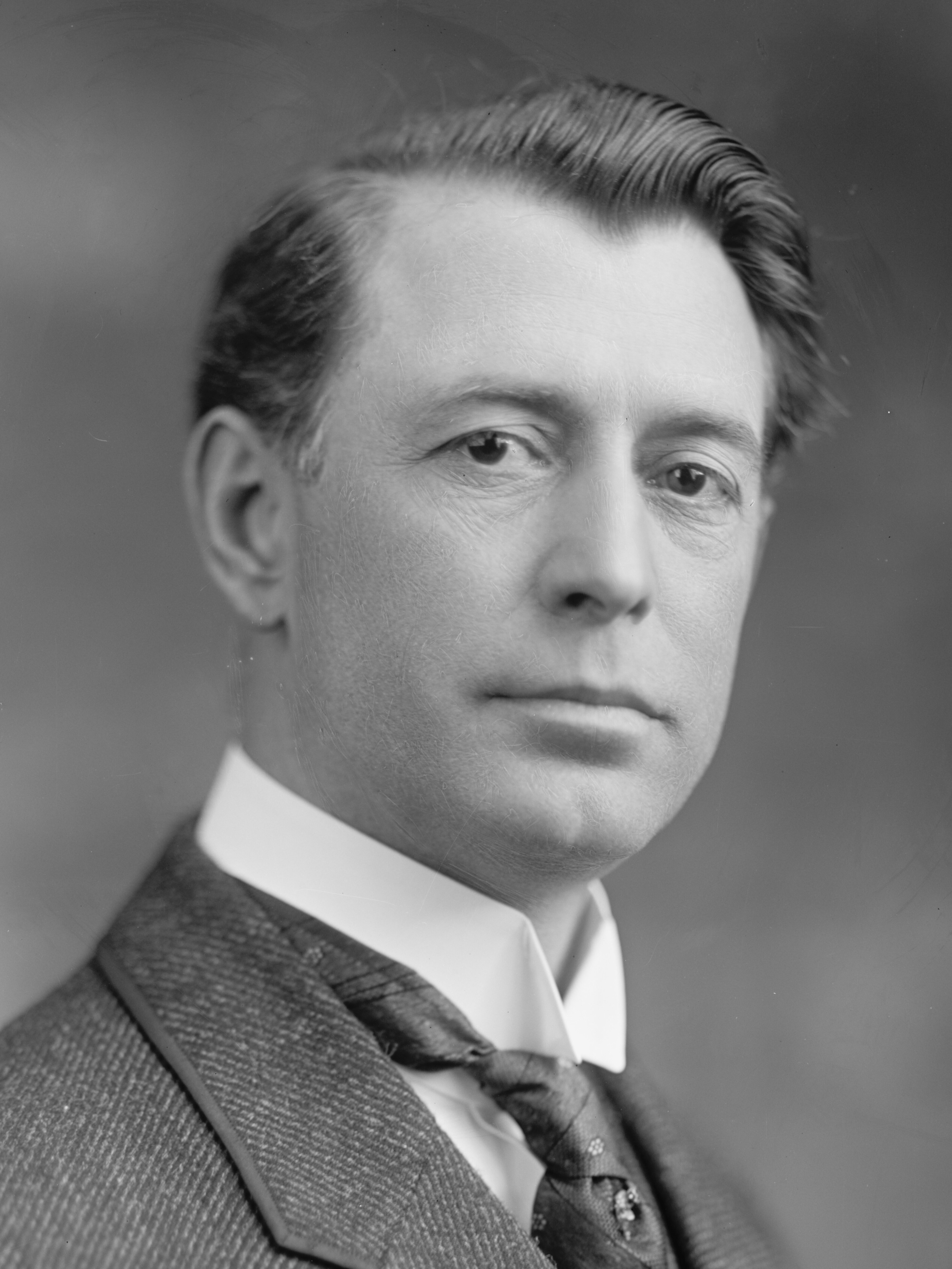

Nominee	Key Pittman	Samuel Platt
Party	Democratic	Republican
Popular vote	19,515	13,414
Percentage	59.26%	40.74%
- County results Pittman: 50–60% 60–70% 70–80% Platt: 50–60%
U.S. senator before election
Key Pittman
Democratic
Elected U.S. Senator
Key Pittman
Democratic

The 1928 United States Senate election in Nevada took place on November 6, 1928. Incumbent Democratic Senator Key Pittman won re-election to a fourth term (third full term) against Sam Platt. This election was a rematch of the 1916 election for the same seat, as Pittman also won that election against Platt.

== Primary elections ==
Primary elections were held on September 4, 1928. However, each candidate ran unopposed for their party in this election, so there were no primary elections.

=== Democratic primary ===
==== Candidates ====
- Key Pittman, incumbent U.S. Senator

=== Republican primary ===
==== Candidates ====
- Samuel Platt, former Speaker of the Nevada House of Representatives (1905-1907) and candidate for this seat in 1916

== General election ==
=== Results ===
1928 United States Senate election in Nevada
Party	Candidate	Votes	%
Democratic	Key Pittman (incumbent)	19,515	59.26
Republican	Samuel Platt	13,414	40.74
Majority		6,101	18.52
Turnout		32,929	
Democratic hold			
