= 1934 United States Senate election in Nevada =

- November 6, 1934
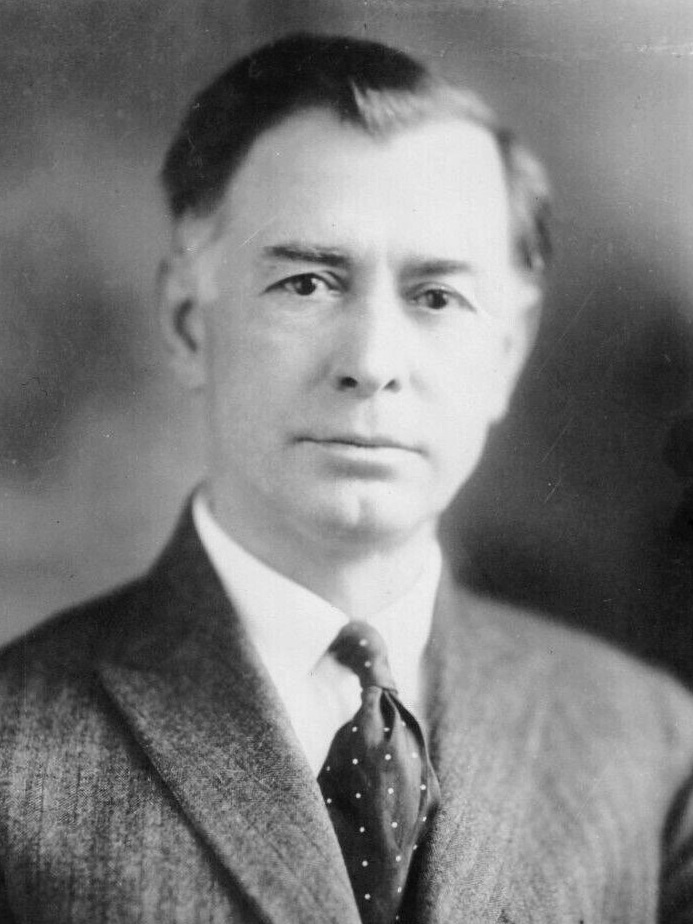

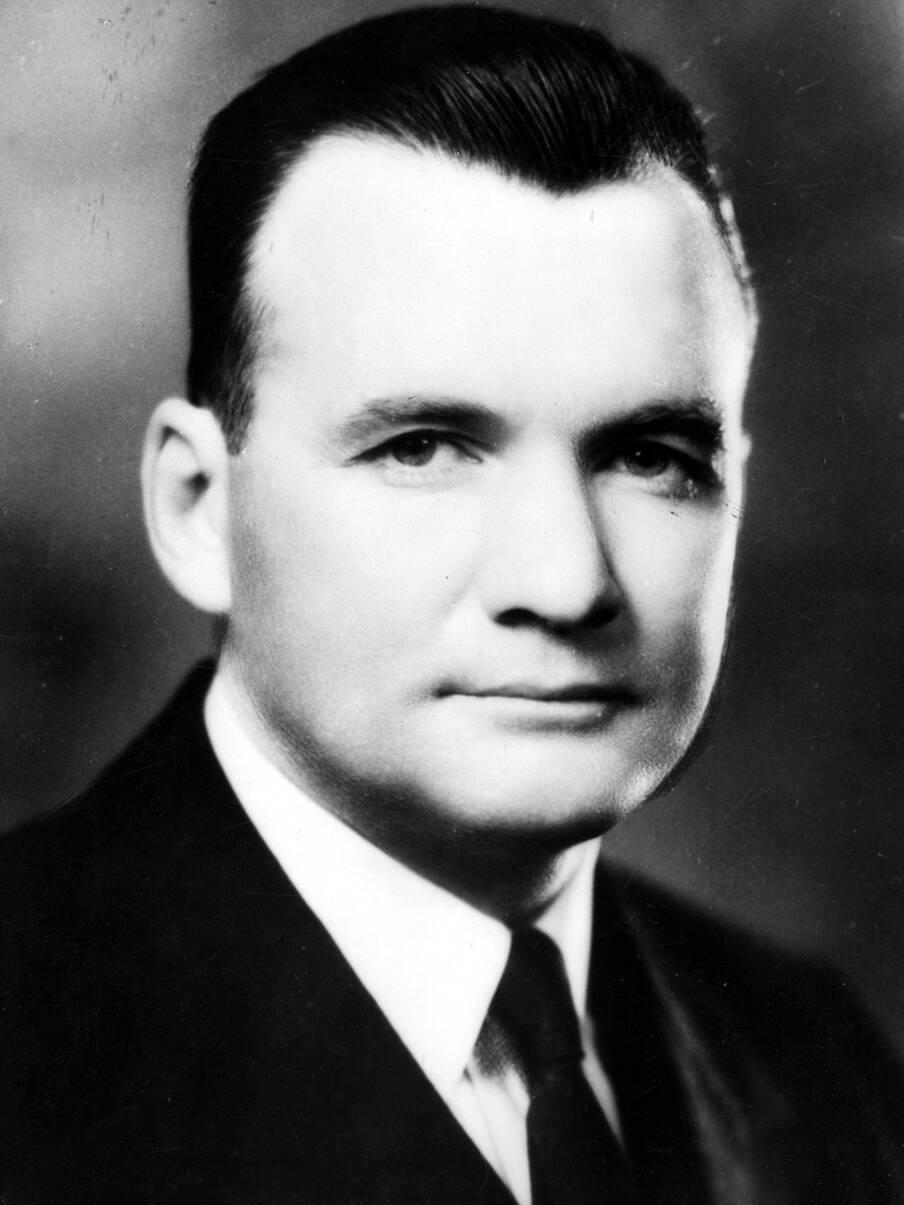
Nominee	Key Pittman	George W. Malone
Party	Democratic	Republican
Popular vote	27,581	14,273
Percentage	64.51%	33.38%
- County results Pittman: 50–60% 60–70% 70–80% 80–90% Malone: 50–60%
U.S. senator before election
Key Pittman
Democratic
Elected U.S. Senator
Key Pittman
Democratic

The 1934 United States Senate election in Nevada took place on November 6, 1934. Incumbent Democratic Senator Key Pittman won re-election to a fifth term (fourth full term) against George W. Malone, an engineer (who would later win this Senate seat in 1946). This was the only time Key Pittman won a full term against someone who was not a speaker of the Nevada House of Representatives.

== Primary elections ==
Primary elections were held on September 4, 1934.

=== Democratic primary ===
==== Candidates ====
- Key Pittman, incumbent U.S. Senator
- H. R. Cooke, former member of the Nevada Assembly from Washoe County (1903-1905)
- Bob Moore

==== Results ====
Democratic primary results
Party	Candidate	Votes	%
Democratic	Key Pittman	13,474	71.44
Democratic	H. R. Cooke	4,334	22.98
Democratic	Bob Moore	1,053	5.58
Total votes		18,861	

=== Republican primary ===
==== Candidates ====
- George W. Malone, engineer
- August C. Frolich
- Clyde D. Souter

==== Results ====
Republican primary results
Party	Candidate	Votes	%
Republican	George W. Malone	5,907	51.62
Republican	August C. Frolich	2,806	24.52
Republican	Clyde D. Souter	2,730	23.86
Total votes		11,443	

== General election ==
=== Results ===
1934 United States Senate election in Nevada
Party	Candidate	Votes	%
Democratic	Key Pittman (Incumbent)	27,581	64.51
Republican	George W. Malone	14,273	33.38
Independent	John P. Reynolds	901	2.11
Majority		13,308	31.13
Turnout		42,755	
Democratic hold			
