= Key Pittman =

American politician (1872–1940)

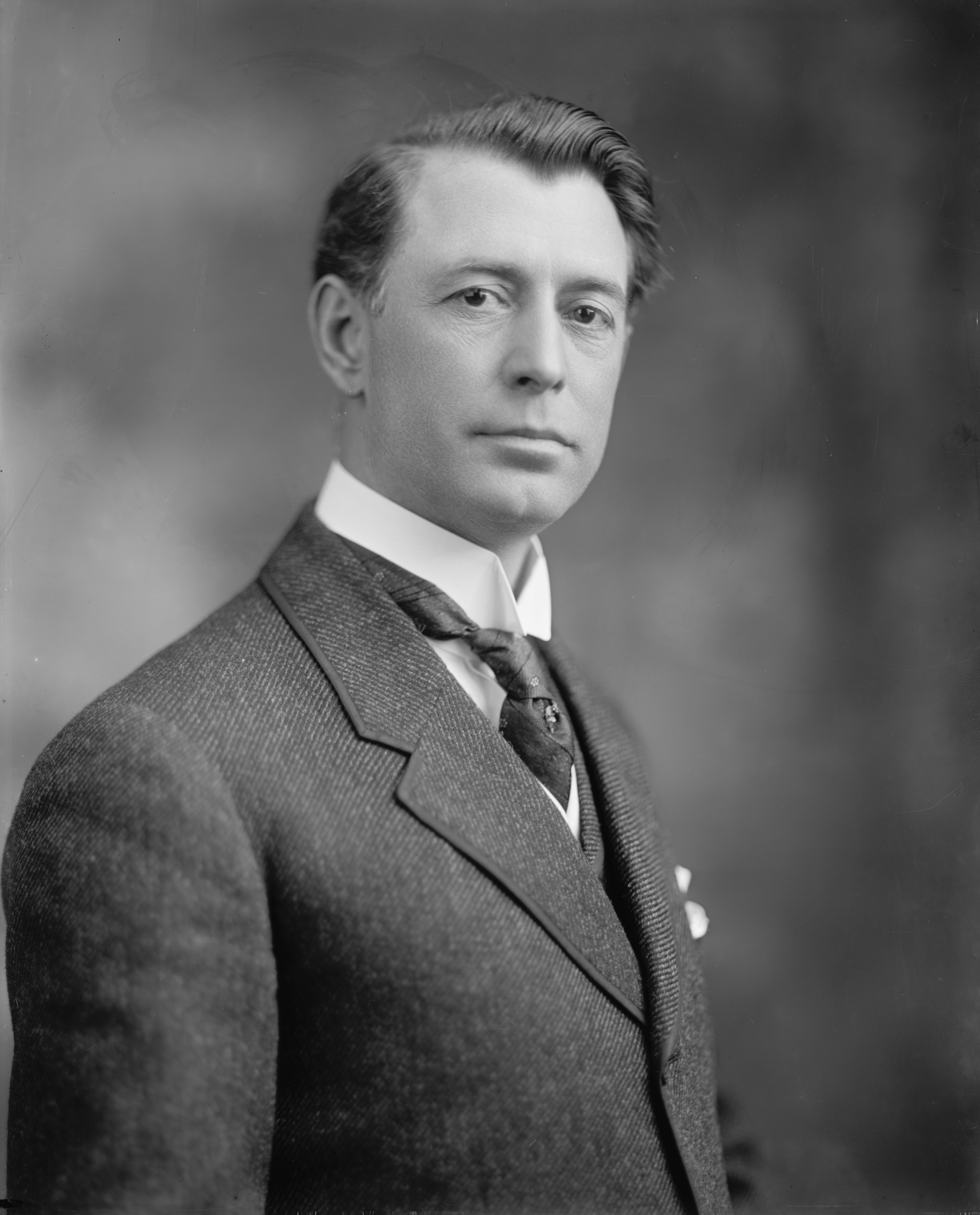
- Pittman as Senator

President pro tempore of the United States Senate
- In office March 4, 1933 – November 10, 1940
- Preceded by: George H. Moses
- Succeeded by: William H. King

Chair of the Senate Foreign Relations Committee
- In office March 4, 1933 – November 10, 1940
- Preceded by: William Borah
- Succeeded by: Walter F. George

Secretary of the Senate Democratic Caucus Acting
- In office December 14, 1916 – March 3, 1917
- Leader: John W. Kern
- Preceded by: Willard Saulsbury Jr.
- Succeeded by: William H. King

United States Senator from Nevada
- In office January 29, 1913 – November 10, 1940
- Preceded by: William A. Massey
- Succeeded by: Berkeley L. Bunker

Personal details
- Born: Key Denson Pittman; September 12, 1872 Vicksburg, Mississippi, U.S.
- Died: November 10, 1940 (aged 68) Reno, Nevada, U.S.
- Resting place: Masonic Memorial Gardens; Reno, Nevada
- Party: Democratic
- Spouse: Mimosa Gates
- Education: Southwestern Presbyterian University (now Rhodes College)

Key Denson Pittman (September 12, 1872 – November 10, 1940) was a United States senator from Nevada and a member of the Democratic Party, serving eventually as president pro tempore as well as chairman of the Foreign Relations Committee.

== Biography ==
=== Early years ===
Pittman was born in Vicksburg, Mississippi on September 12, 1872, a son of William Buckner Pittman and Katherine Key Pittman. His siblings included a younger brother, Vail M. Pittman, who served as Governor of Nevada.

Key Pittman was educated by private tutors and at the Southwestern Presbyterian University in Clarksville, Tennessee. He studied law, then later was admitted to the bar. In 1897, Pittman joined in the Klondike Gold Rush and worked as a miner until 1901.

Pittman moved to Tonopah, Nevada, in 1902 and continued the practice of law. He represented Nevada at the St. Louis Exposition, the Lewis and Clark Centennial Exposition, and the National Irrigation Congress.

=== Political career ===
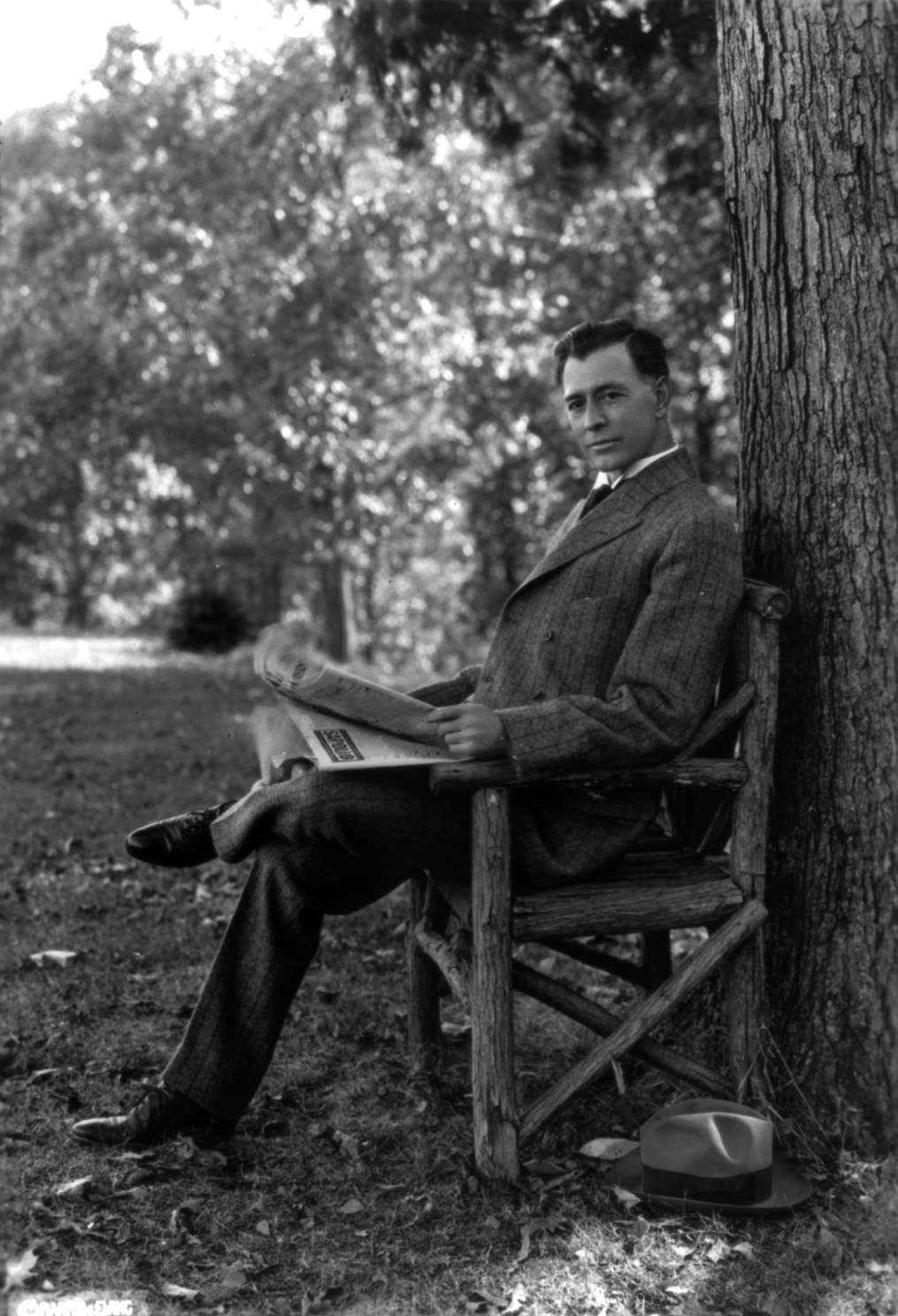
Pittman in 1918.

In the early 20th century, Nevada was one of several states that hoped to institute the popular election of United States senators; the U.S. Constitution had provided for them to be elected by state legislatures. The states aiming to change this held popular elections as Senate terms expired, with the goal of forcing their legislatures to elect the people's choices. This was almost certainly unconstitutional, but the matter never reached the U.S. Supreme Court before the 17th Amendment became part of the Constitution.

Nevada held a popular vote for the Senate in 1910, in which Pittman was the Democratic nominee; he lost to Republican incumbent George S. Nixon. After Nixon died on June 5, 1912, Pittman faced Republican interim appointee William A. Massey in a special election that November. Pittman won the election and, as happened in all of these questionable Senate elections held prior to the adoption of the 17th Amendment, the Nevada Legislature made the popular result official. The 17th Amendment was ratified in 1913 and Pittman won full terms in 1916, 1922, 1928, and 1934; he was re-elected again in 1940 but died shortly after the election.

Between 1933 and 1940, during the Presidency of Franklin D. Roosevelt, Pittman was the chairman of the powerful Committee on Foreign Relations, in which capacity (after much prompting by the President) he authored the Pittman Act that formed the basis of the Neutrality Act of November,1939, enabling allies to purchase war materiel from the United States on a cash-and-carry basis. He was a member of the Committee on Territories and the Committee on Industrial Expositions. In addition, during those years Pittman was also President pro tempore of the United States Senate.

Among his legislation is the Pittman–Robertson Wildlife Restoration Act of 1937, which set up a formula for federal sharing of ammunition tax revenue for establishing state wildlife areas. The program is still in effect. The Key Pittman Wildlife Management Area near Hiko, Nevada, which encompasses the Frenchy and Nesbitt lakes, is named in his honor.

=== Death and legacy ===
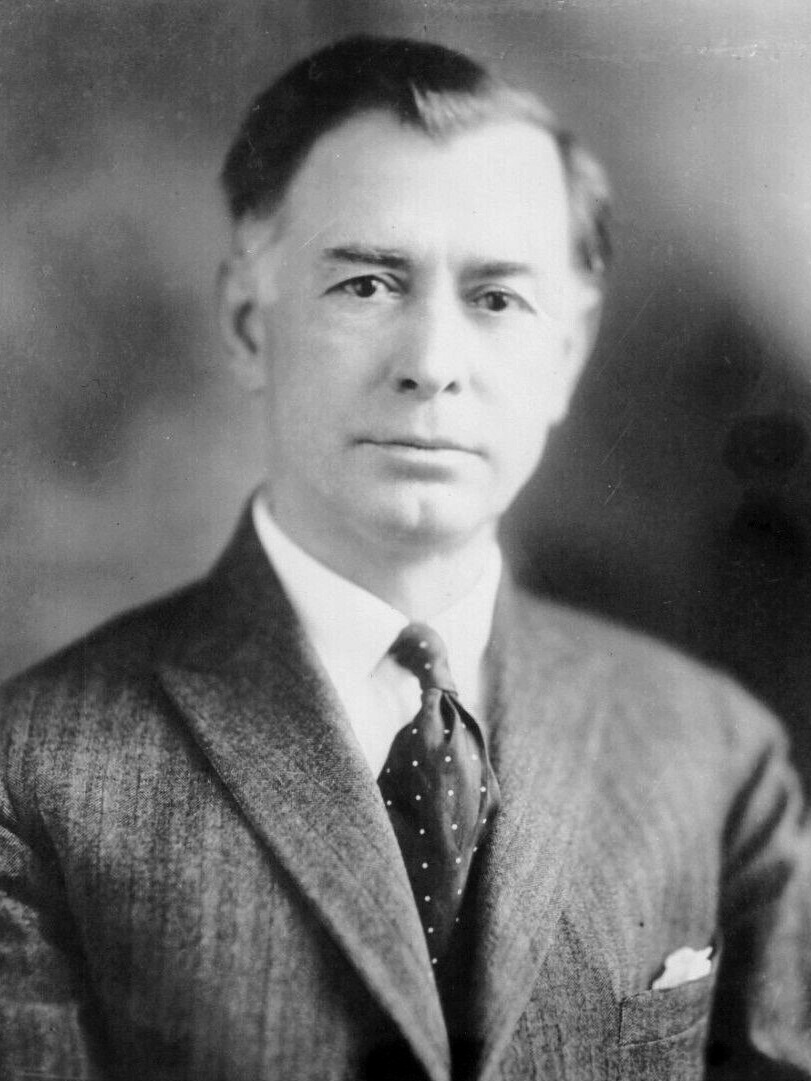
Pittman in 1933, when he was elected as President pro tem of the U.S. Senate.

It was falsely rumored for years that Pittman died before his final election in 1940, and that Democratic party leaders kept the body at Tonopah's Mizpah Hotel in a bathtub full of ice until after he was reelected so Governor Edward P. Carville, a fellow Democrat, could appoint a replacement. The truth was, former Nevada State Archivist Guy Rocha wrote, "just as disreputable." Pittman suffered a severe heart attack just before the election on November 5, and two doctors told his aides before the election that death was imminent. To avoid affecting the election, the party told the press that the senator was hospitalized for exhaustion and that his condition was not serious. Pittman died on November 10 at the Washoe General Hospital in Reno, Nevada. He was buried at Masonic Memorial Gardens in Reno.

Several pieces of legislation bore his name, including the Pittman Act of 1918, concerning silver coinage, and the Pittman–Robertson Federal Aid in Wildlife Restoration Act of 1937.

The Pittman section of the Alaska Railroad, more commonly known today as the community of Meadow Lakes west of Wasilla, was also named for him. Pittman Road runs north from its intersection with the George Parks Highway at "downtown" Meadow Lakes.

A section of the city of Henderson, Nevada is unofficially known as Pittman. There is also a natural wash that traverses a large section of Henderson named after the former senator. It is known as the Pittman Wash and has a walking/biking trail alongside it.

In 1941 Pittman's widow, the former Mimosa Gates, donated his papers to the Library of Congress. She withdrew them in 1942, but they were returned to the Library by the Gates family in 1954.

== See also ==
- List of members of the United States Congress who died in office (1900–1949)

== Footnotes ==
Party political offices
New office	Democratic nominee for U.S. Senator from Nevada (Class 1); 1911, 1913, 1916, 1922, 1928, 1934, 1940	Succeeded by James G. Scrugham
Preceded by Willard Saulsbury Jr.	Secretary of the Senate Democratic Caucus; Acting; 1916–1917	Succeeded by William H. King
U.S. Senate
Preceded by William A. Massey	U.S. Senator (Class 1) from Nevada; 1913–1940; Served alongside: Francis G. Newlands, Charles Henderson, Tasker Oddie, Pat McCarran	Succeeded by Berkeley L. Bunker
Preceded by William Alden Smith	Chair of the Senate Territories Committee; 1913–1917	Succeeded by Harry Stewart New
Preceded by Thomas W. Hardwick	Chair of the Senate Industrial Expositions Committee; 1919–1921	Position abolished
Preceded by William Borah	Chair of the Senate Foreign Relations Committee; 1933–1940	Succeeded by Walter F. George
Political offices
Preceded by George H. Moses	President pro tempore of the U.S. Senate; 1933–1940	Succeeded by William H. King
