= Edward P. Carville =

American politician

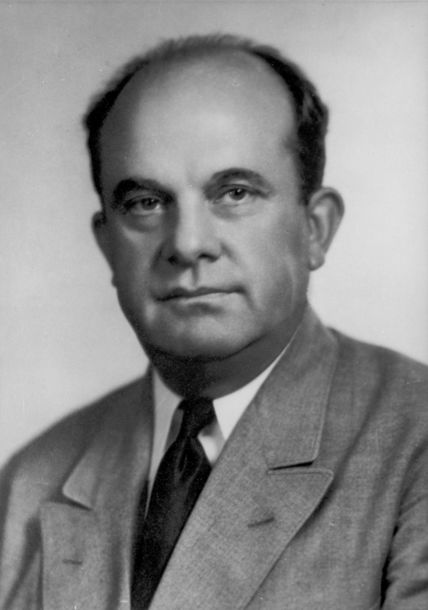

United States Senator from Nevada
- In office July 25, 1945 – January 3, 1947
- Appointed by: Vail Pittman
- Preceded by: James G. Scrugham
- Succeeded by: George W. Malone

18th Governor of Nevada
- In office January 2, 1939 – July 24, 1945
- Lieutenant: Maurice J. Sullivan; Vail M. Pittman
- Preceded by: Richard Kirman Sr.
- Succeeded by: Vail Pittman

Personal details
- Born: Edward Peter Carville; May 14, 1885 Elko County, Nevada, U.S.
- Died: June 27, 1956 (aged 71) Reno, Nevada, U.S.
- Resting place: Our Mother of Sorrows Cemetery; Reno, Nevada, U.S.
- Party: Democratic
- Spouse: Irma Marie Callahan
- Children: 4
- Education: University of Notre Dame
- Profession: Attorney

Edward Peter Carville (May 14, 1885 – June 27, 1956) was an American politician. He was the 18th governor of Nevada and a senator from Nevada. He was a member of the Democratic Party.

== Biography ==
Carville was born on May 14, 1885, at Mound Valley in Elko County, Nevada. He graduated with a law degree from the University of Notre Dame in Notre Dame, Indiana in 1909. Admitted to the bar in the same year, he established his practice in Elko, Nevada. He married Irma Marie Callahan on August 29, 1910 and they had three sons, Edward, Richard, and Robert.

== Career ==
Carville was appointed to the position of deputy district attorney and served from 1910 to 1911. He was district attorney for Elko County from 1912 to 1918. He was a district judge of Elko County in 1928. He was a United States Attorney for Nevada between 1934 and 1938.

Carville was elected Governor of Nevada in 1938 and, re-elected in 1942, he served there until his resignation in 1945. During his tenure, World War II, government, and economic issues were addressed.

He was appointed on July 24, 1945 to the United States Senate to fill the vacancy caused by the death of James G. Scrugham and served from July 25, 1945 to January 3, 1947. He was an unsuccessful candidate for renomination in 1946 and resumed his practice of law in Reno, Nevada.

== Death ==
Carville died on June 27, 1956, at the age of 71. He is interred at Our Mother of Sorrows Cemetery, Reno, Washoe County, Nevada.

Party political offices
Preceded by Richard Kirman Sr.	Democratic nominee for Governor of Nevada; 1938, 1942	Succeeded by Vail M. Pittman
Political offices
Preceded by Richard Kirman Sr.	Governor of Nevada; 1939 – 1945	Succeeded by Vail M. Pittman
U.S. Senate
Preceded by James G. Scrugham	U.S. senator (Class 1) from Nevada; 1945 – 1947; Served alongside: Pat McCarran	Succeeded by George W. Malone
