= 1920 United States Senate election in Nevada =

- November 2, 1920
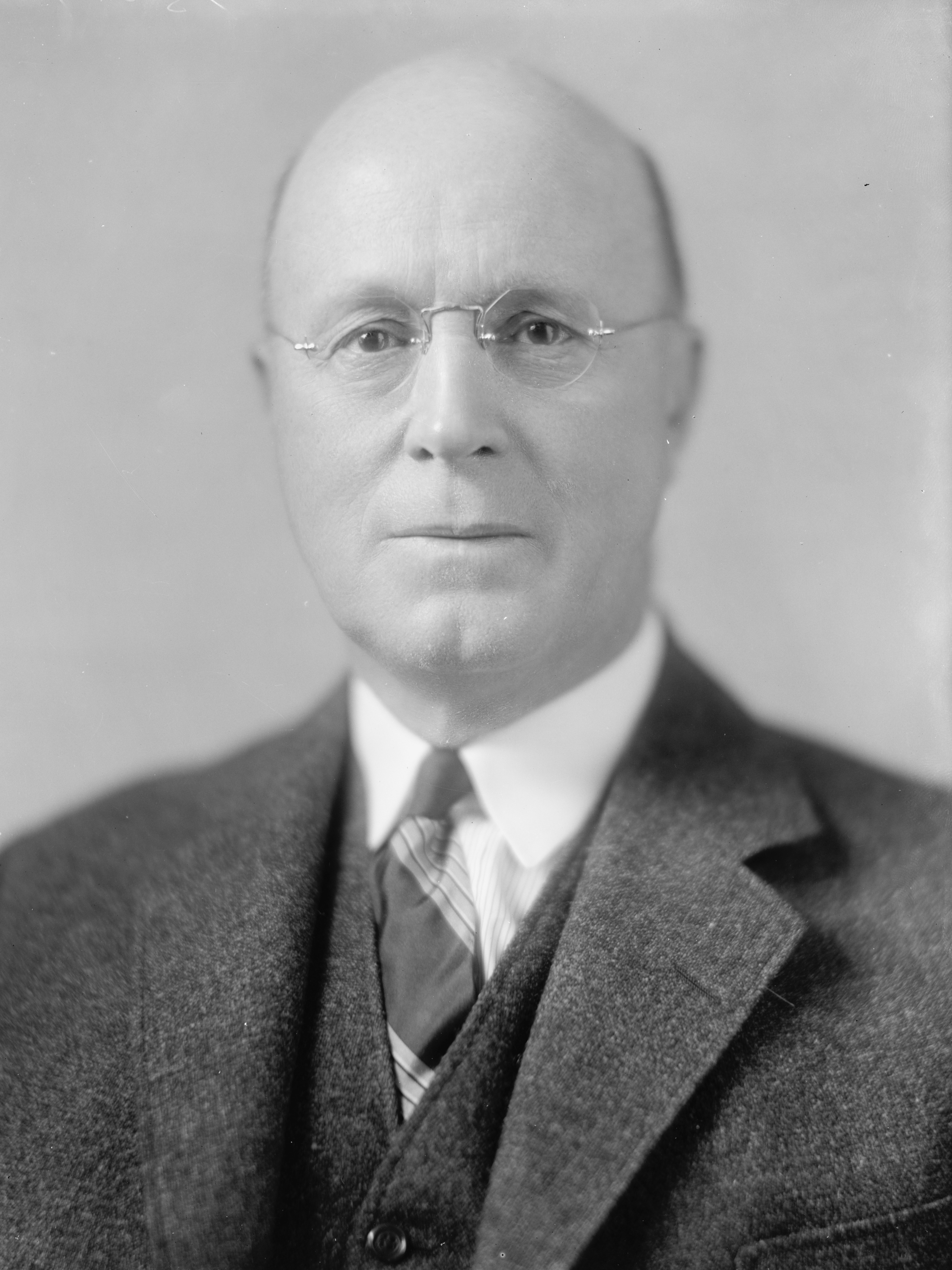

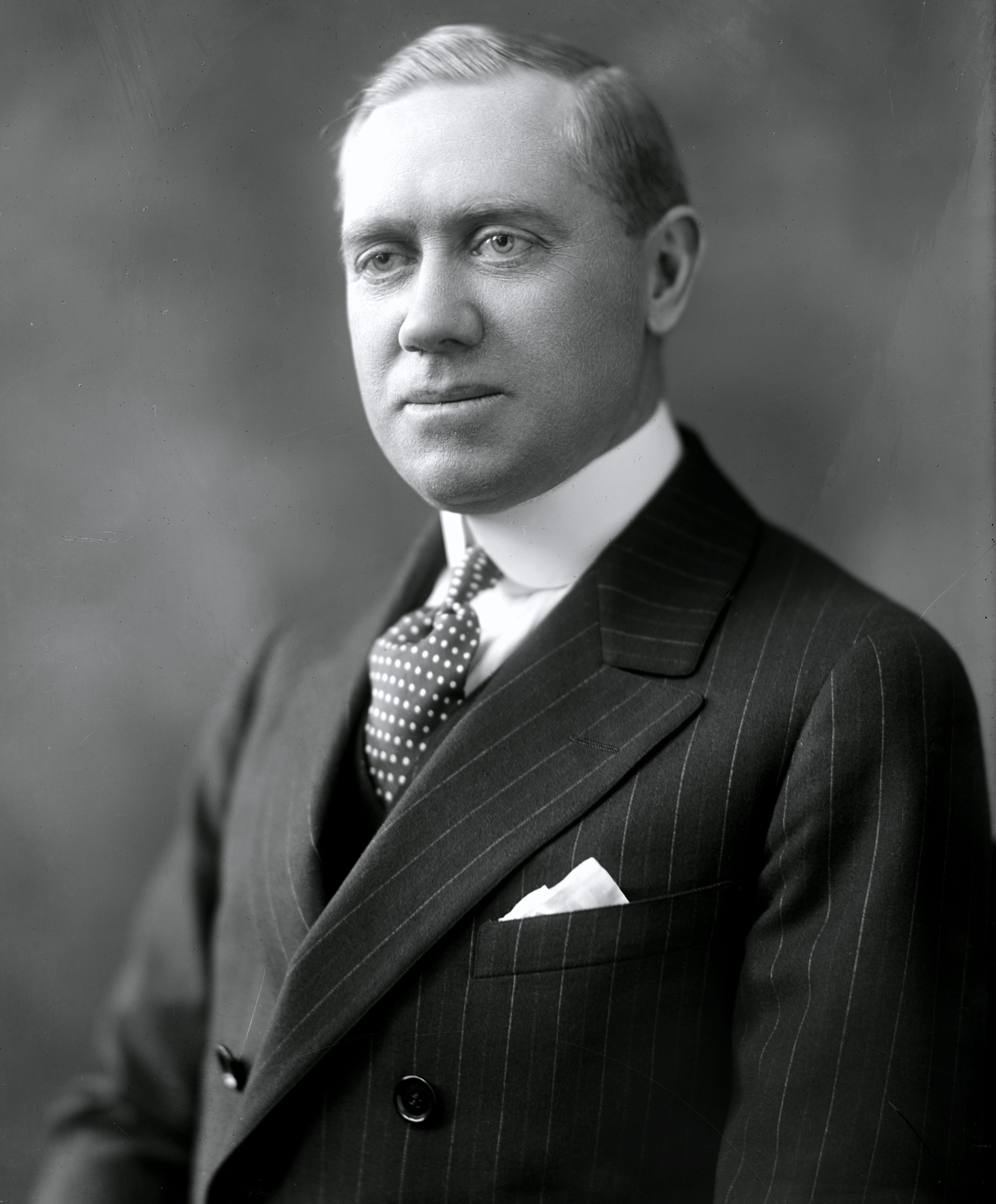

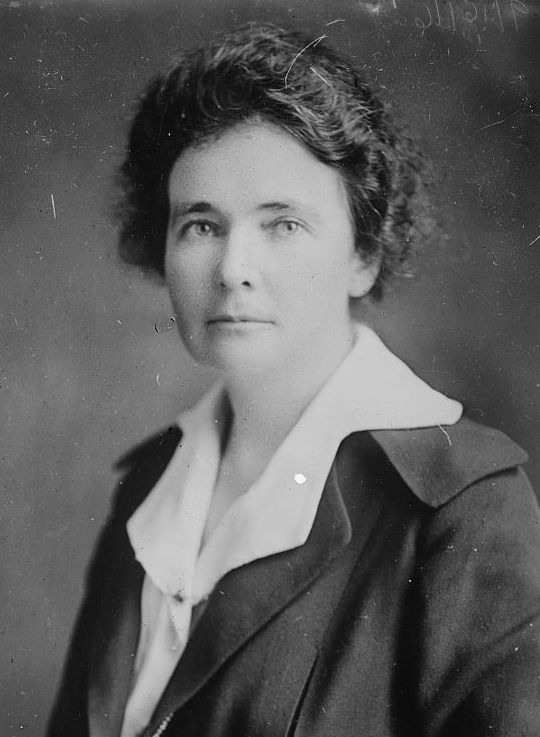
Nominee	Tasker Oddie	Charles Henderson	Anne Henrietta Martin
Party	Republican	Democratic	Independent
Popular vote	11,550	10,402	4,981
Percentage	42.11%	37.93%	18.16%
- County results Oddie: 30–40% 40–50% 50–60% 60–70% Henderson: 30–40% 40–50% 50–60%
U.S. senator before election
Charles Henderson
Democratic
Elected U.S. Senator
Tasker Oddie
Republican

The 1920 United States Senate election in Nevada took place on November 2, 1920. Incumbent Democratic Senator Charles Henderson, who had won a partial term in 1918, ran for a full term, but lost re-election to former Governor of Nevada Tasker Oddie.

== Primary elections ==
Primary elections were held on September 7, 1920.

=== Democratic primary ===
==== Candidates ====
- Charles Henderson, incumbent U.S. Senator

Henderson ran unopposed for the Democratic nomination, so there was no Democratic primary.

=== Republican primary ===
==== Candidates ====
- Tasker Oddie, former Governor of Nevada (1911-1915)
- Brewster Adams, Baptist minister
- Ashley Grant Miller, Socialist candidate for this seat in 1914 and Nevada's other Senate seat in 1916
- Sardis Summerfield, Bull Moose candidate for Nevada's other Senate seat in 1912
- Charles E. Wharton

==== Results ====
Republican primary results
Party	Candidate	Votes	%
Republican	Tasker Oddie	3,165	44.51
Republican	Brewster Adams	2,151	30.25
Republican	Ashley Grant Miller	1,243	17.48
Republican	Sardis Summerfield	333	4.68
Republican	Charles E. Wharton	219	3.08
Total votes		7,111	

== General election ==
=== Results ===
1920 United States Senate election in Nevada
Party	Candidate	Votes	%
Republican	Tasker Oddie	11,550	42.11
Democratic	Charles B. Henderson (incumbent)	10,402	37.93
Independent	Anne Henrietta Martin	4,981	18.16
Socialist	James Jepson	494	1.80
Majority		1,148	5.18
Turnout		27,427	
Republican gain from Democratic			
