= 1938 United States Senate election in Nevada =

- November 8, 1938
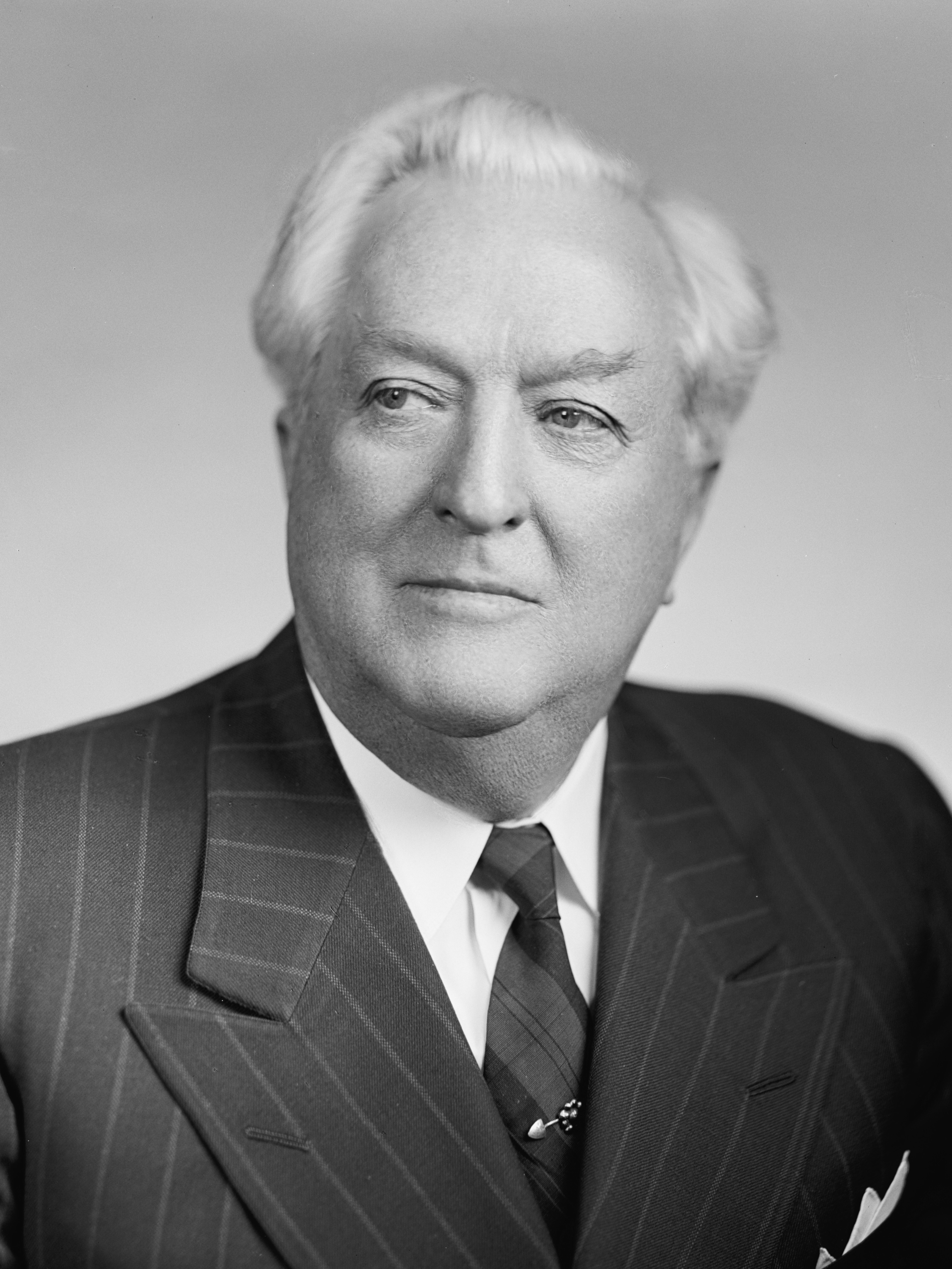

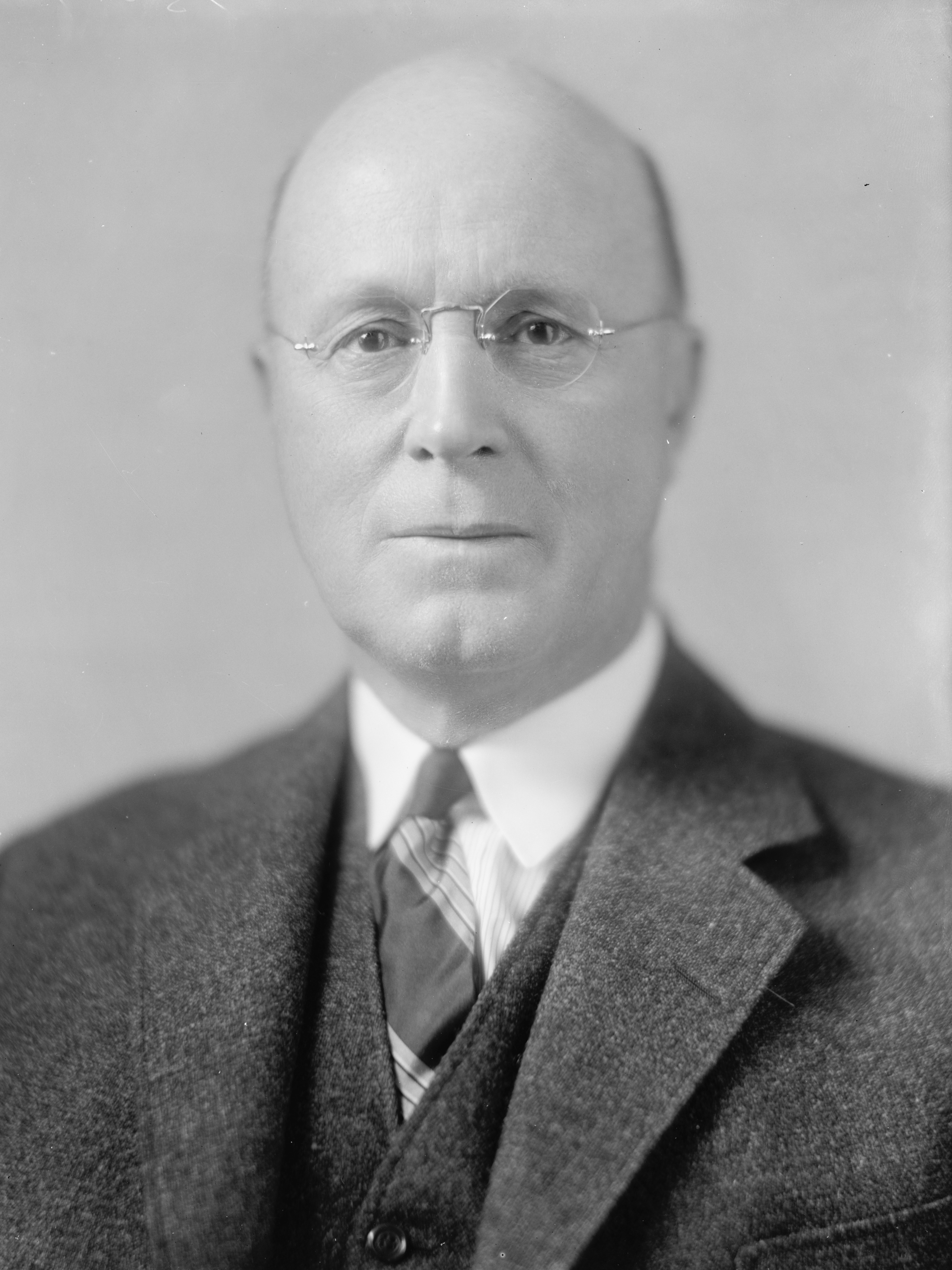
Nominee	Pat McCarran	Tasker Oddie
Party	Democratic	Republican
Popular vote	27,406	19,078
Percentage	58.96%	41.04%
- County results McCarran: 50–60% 60–70% 70–80% 80–90% Oddie: 50–60%
U.S. senator before election
Pat McCarran
Democratic
Elected U.S. Senator
Pat McCarran
Democratic

The 1938 United States Senate election in Nevada took place on November 8, 1938. Incumbent Democratic Senator Pat McCarran won re-election against former Senator Tasker Oddie in a rematch of the 1932 election for the same seat.

== Primary elections ==
Primary elections were held on September 6, 1938.

=== Democratic primary ===
==== Candidates ====
- Pat McCarran, incumbent U.S. Senator
- Albert Hilliard, attorney from Reno, Nevada
- John E. Worden, Socialist candidate for the U.S. House of Representatives in 1912

==== Results ====
Democratic primary results
Party	Candidate	Votes	%
Democratic	Pat McCarran (incumbent)	17,921	74.34
Democratic	Albert Hilliard	5,329	22.11
Democratic	John E. Worden	857	3.55
Total votes		24,107	

=== Republican primary ===
==== Candidates ====
- Tasker Oddie, former U.S. Senator (1921-1933)

Oddie ran unopposed for the Republican nomination, so there was no Republican primary.

== General election ==
=== Results ===
1938 United States Senate election in Nevada
Party	Candidate	Votes	%
Democratic	Pat McCarran (incumbent)	27,406	58.96
Republican	Tasker Oddie	19,078	41.04
Majority		8,328	17.92
Turnout		46,484	
Democratic hold			
