= Charles Henderson (Nevada politician) =

American politician

Charles B. Henderson
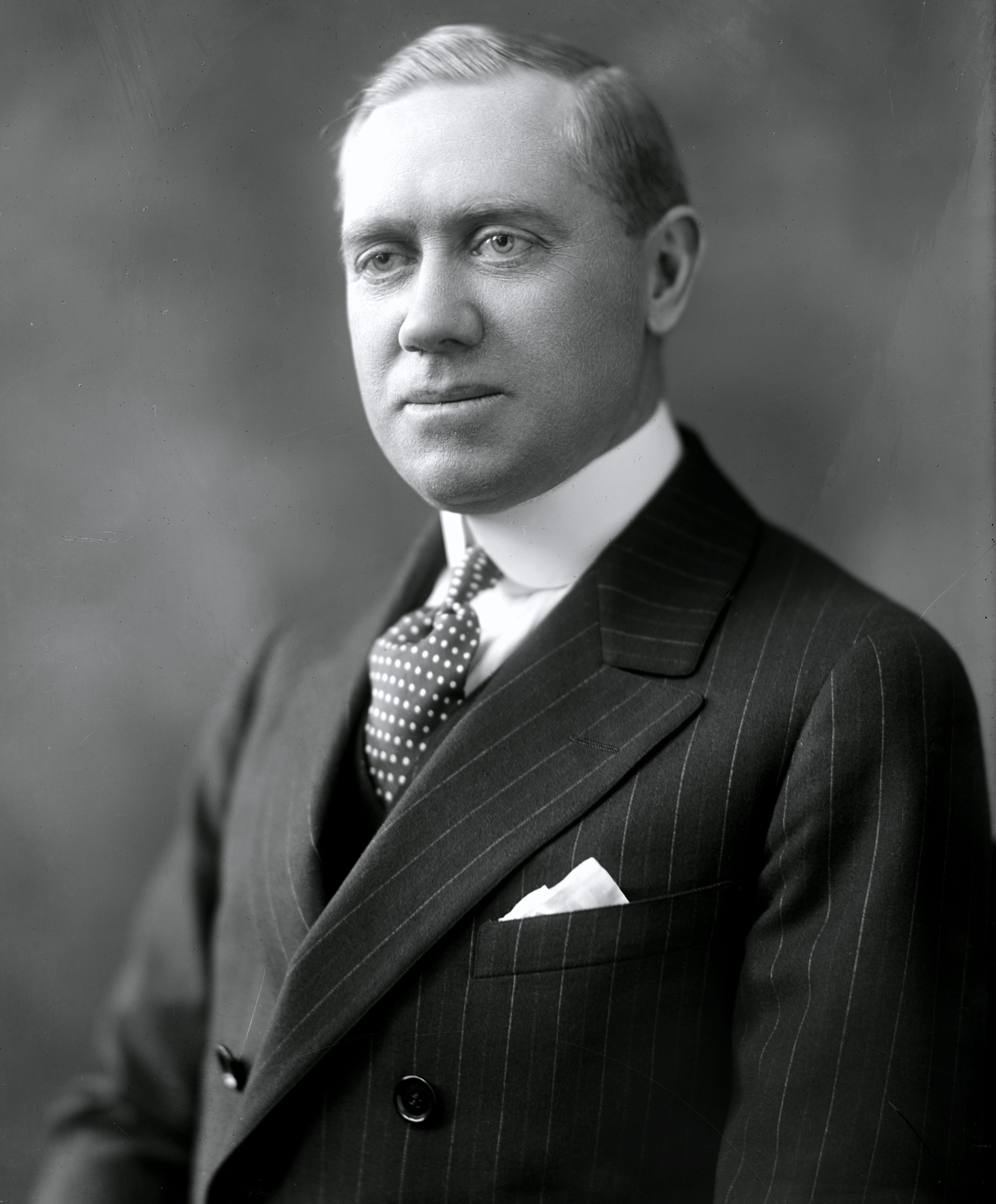

United States Senator from Nevada
- In office January 12, 1918 – March 3, 1921
- Preceded by: Francis G. Newlands
- Succeeded by: Tasker Oddie

Personal details
- Born: June 8, 1873 San Jose, California, U.S.
- Died: November 8, 1954 (aged 81) San Francisco, California, U.S.
- Party: Democratic
- Education: University of Michigan Law School
- Profession: Attorney, businessman

Charles Belknap Henderson (June 8, 1873 – November 8, 1954) was an American attorney, businessman, and politician who served as United States Senator from Nevada.

== Biography ==
Born in San Jose, California, he moved with his parents to Nevada in 1876, and attended the public schools in Elko, the University of the Pacific, and Stanford University in California. He earned a law degree from the University of Michigan in 1895, and was admitted to the bar in 1896, commencing practice in Elko. He served as first lieutenant in Theodore Roosevelt’s Rough Riders during the Spanish–American War, and was district attorney of Elko County from 1901 to 1905. He was a member of the Nevada Assembly from 1905 to 1907, and a regent of the University of Nevada from 1907 to 1917.

Henderson was appointed to the U.S. Senate on January 12, 1918, by Governor Emmet D. Boyle to fill the vacancy caused by the death of Francis G. Newlands. He was subsequently elected on November 5, 1918, as a Democrat and served until March 3, 1921. While in the Senate, Henderson was chairman of the Committee on Industrial Expositions (65th Congress) and a member of the Committee on Mines and Mining (65th Congress). Henderson was defeated in his bid for reelection in 1920 by former governor, Tasker Oddie, a Republican.

Days after his term ended as senator of Nevada, Henderson was approached in the Senate building by Charles August Grock, who had lost a land-related lawsuit to Henderson's law firm 25 years previously. Grock held a gun to Henderson's chest, a struggle ensued, and Henderson was shot in the forearm. Grock was arrested and Henderson was found "calmly bandaging his arm and not at all excited." He later said that he believed his assailant to be mentally unsound.

In 1934, Henderson was appointed a member of the board of directors of the Reconstruction Finance Corporation; elected chairman in 1941, he served until he resigned in 1947. He retired from political activities, but remained was president and director of the Elko Telephone & Telegraph Co., and a director of the Western Pacific Railroad.

In 1953, a largely industrial town south of Las Vegas incorporated itself as Henderson, Nevada, naming itself after the former senator.

Charles Henderson died in San Francisco, California, in 1954, and was interred in Elko City Cemetery in Elko, Nevada.

Party political offices
Preceded by Francis G. Newlands	Democratic nominee for U.S. Senator from Nevada (Class 3); 1918, 1920	Succeeded by Raymond T. Baker
U.S. Senate
Preceded by Francis G. Newlands	U.S. senator (Class 3) from Nevada; 1918–1921; Served alongside: Key Pittman	Succeeded by Tasker Oddie
