= 1950 United States Senate election in Nevada =

- November 7, 1950
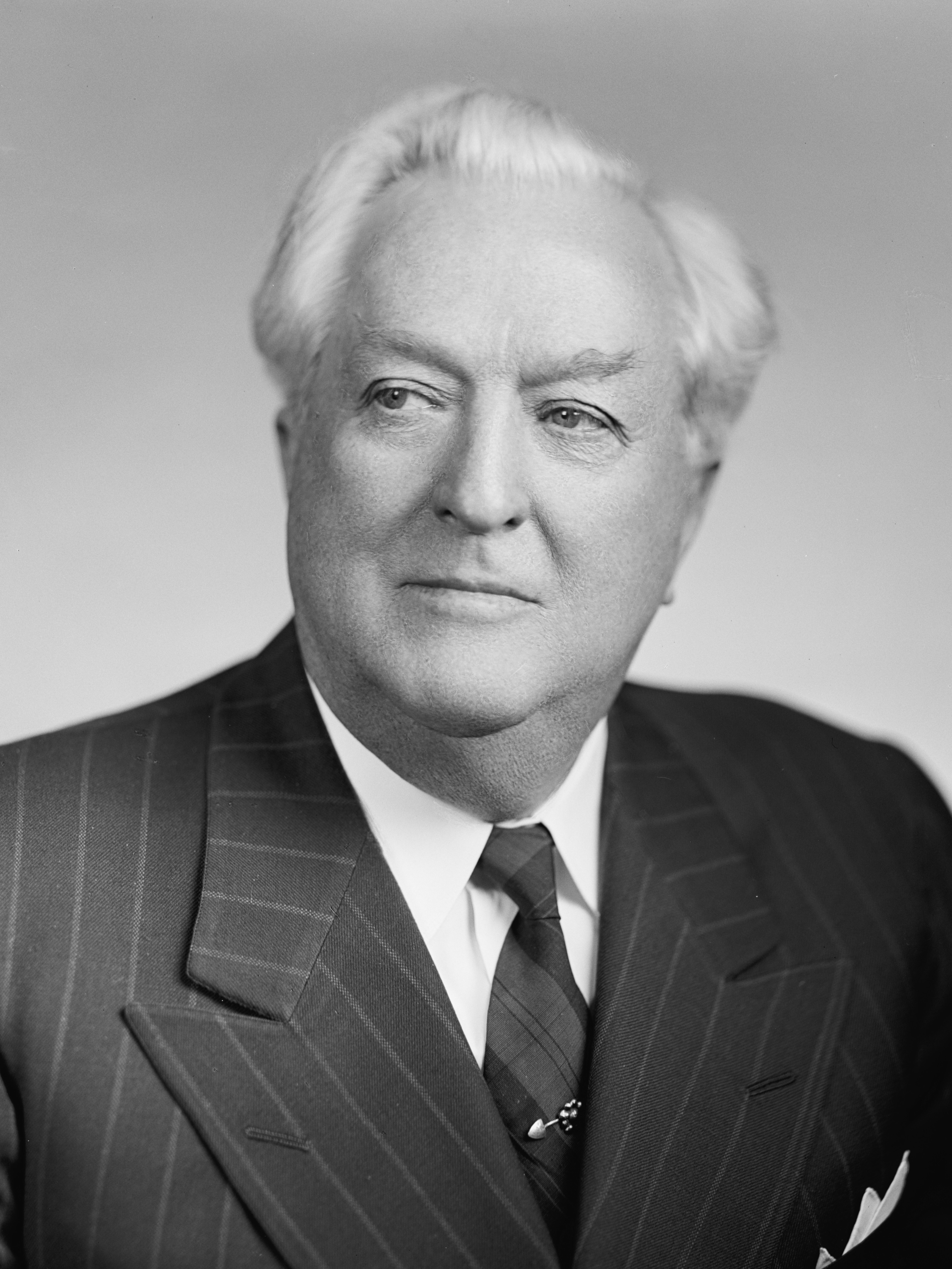

Nominee	Pat McCarran	George E. Marshall
Party	Democratic	Republican
Popular vote	35,829	25,993
Percentage	58.01%	41.99%
- County results McCarran: 50–60% 60–70% 70–80% Marshall: 50–60%
U.S. senator before election
Pat McCarran
Democratic
Elected U.S. Senator
Pat McCarran
Democratic

The 1950 United States Senate election in Nevada was held on November 7, 1950. Incumbent Democratic U.S. Senator Pat McCarran was re-elected to a fourth term in office over Republican George E. Marshall.

== General election ==
=== Candidates ===
- George E. Marshall (Republican)
- Pat McCarran, incumbent U.S. Senator since 1933 (Democratic)

=== Results ===
1950 U.S. Senate election in Nevada
Party	Candidate	Votes	%	±%
Democratic	Pat McCarran (incumbent)	35,829	58.01%	
Republican	George E. Marshall	25,933	41.99%	
Turnout		61,762	100.00%	
Democratic hold		Swing		

== See also ==
- 1950 United States Senate elections
