= 1914 Nevada gubernatorial election =

- November 3, 1914
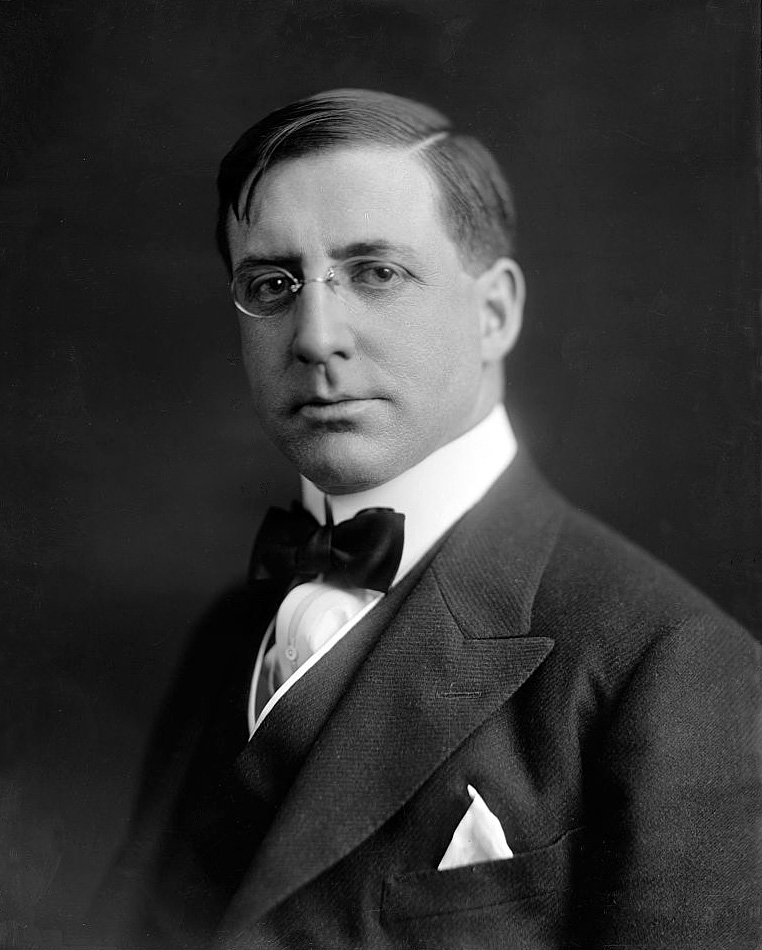

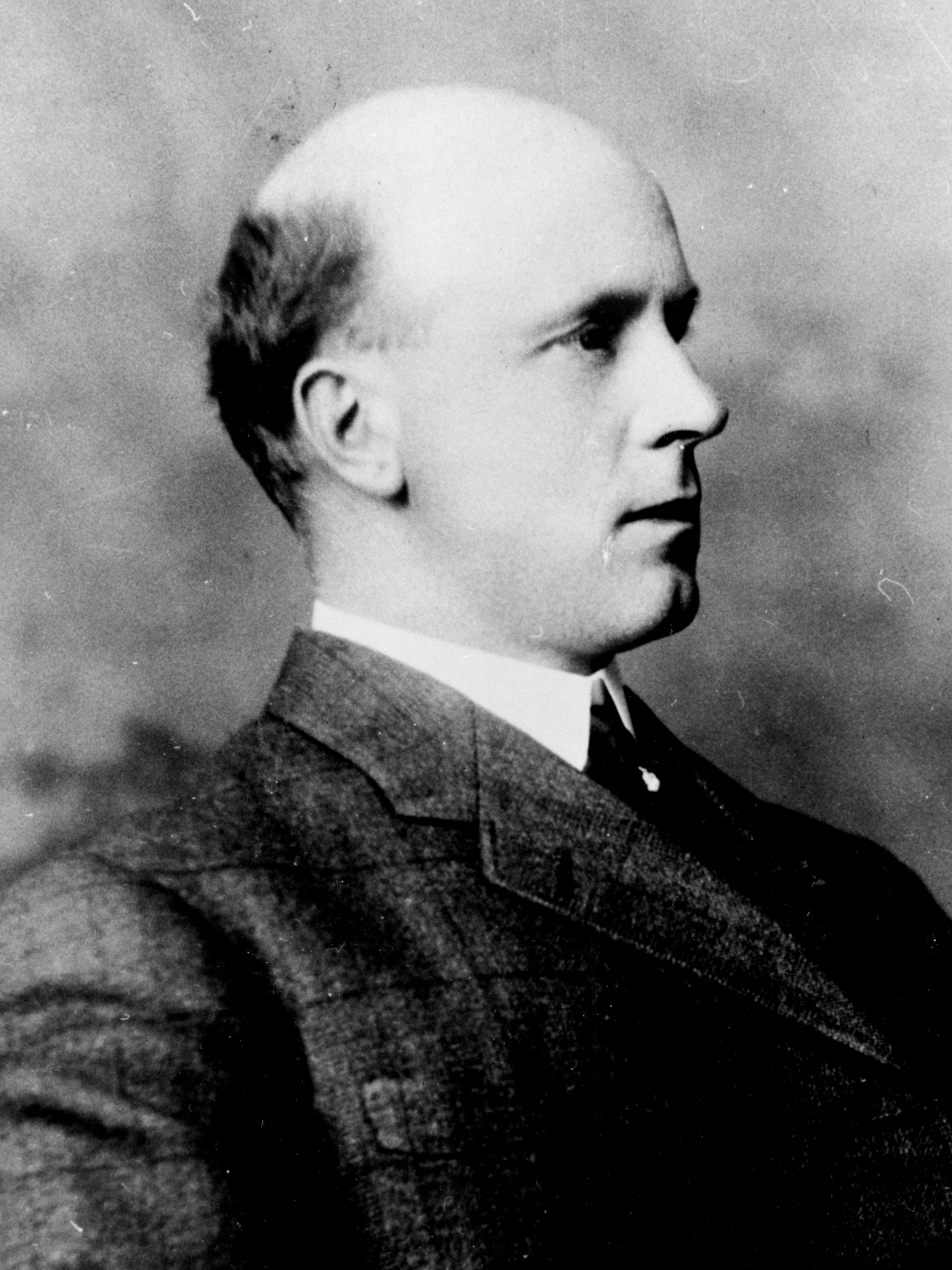

Nominee	Emmet D. Boyle	Tasker Oddie	W. A. Morgan
Party	Democratic	Republican	Socialist
Popular vote	9,623	8,537	3,391
Percentage	44.65%	39.61%	15.74%
- County results Boyle: 40–50% 50–60% Oddie: 30–40% 40–50% 50–60% 60–70%
Governor before election
Tasker Oddie
Republican
Elected Governor
Emmet D. Boyle
Democratic

The 1914 Nevada gubernatorial election was held on November 3, 1914. Democratic nominee Emmet D. Boyle defeated incumbent Republican Tasker Oddie with 44.65% of the vote.

== Primary elections ==
Primary elections were held on September 1, 1914.

=== Democratic primary ===
==== Candidates ====
- Emmet D. Boyle, member of the Nevada State Tax Commission
- Lemuel Allen, former Lieutenant Governor

==== Results ====
Democratic primary results
Party	Candidate	Votes	%
Democratic	Emmet D. Boyle	5,036	64.70
Democratic	Lemuel Allen	2,748	35.30
Total votes		7,784	100.00

== General election ==
=== Candidates ===
Major party candidates

- Emmet D. Boyle, Democratic
- Tasker L. Oddie, Republican

Other candidates

- W. A. Morgan, Socialist

=== Results ===
1914 Nevada gubernatorial election
Party	Candidate	Votes	%	±%
Democratic	Emmet D. Boyle	9,623	44.65%	+2.00%
Republican	Tasker Oddie (incumbent)	8,537	39.61%	−10.98%
Socialist	W. A. Morgan	3,391	15.74%	+8.98%
Plurality		1,086	5.04%	
Total votes		21,551	100.00%	
Democratic gain from Republican		Swing	+12.98%	

=== Results by county ===
County	Emmet D. Boyle Democratic		Tasker L. Oddie Republican		W. A. Morgan Socialist		Margin		Total votes cast
County	#	%	#	%	#	%	#	%	Total votes cast
Churchill	398	34.67%	502	43.73%	248	21.60%	-104	-9.06%	1,148
Clark	447	47.00%	354	37.22%	150	15.77%	93	9.78%	951
Douglas	117	26.77%	283	64.76%	37	8.47%	-166	-37.99%	437
Elko	909	43.24%	885	42.10%	308	14.65%	24	1.14%	2,102
Esmeralda	710	40.09%	623	35.18%	438	24.73%	87	4.91%	1,771
Eureka	156	31.84%	292	59.59%	42	8.57%	-136	-27.76%	490
Humboldt	995	48.39%	676	32.88%	385	18.73%	319	15.52%	2,056
Lander	261	44.39%	239	40.65%	88	14.97%	22	3.74%	588
Lincoln	320	57.87%	173	31.28%	60	10.85%	147	26.58%	553
Lyon	443	43.77%	431	42.59%	138	13.64%	12	1.19%	1,012
Mineral	335	40.22%	360	43.22%	138	16.57%	-25	-3.00%	833
Nye	847	35.45%	865	36.21%	677	28.34%	-18	-0.75%	2,389
Ormsby	300	42.31%	357	50.35%	52	7.33%	-57	-8.04%	709
Storey	348	49.71%	331	47.29%	21	3.00%	17	2.43%	700
Washoe	2,247	55.91%	1,460	36.33%	312	7.76%	787	19.58%	4,019
White Pine	790	44.06%	706	39.38%	297	16.56%	84	4.68%	1,793
Totals	9,623	44.65%	8,537	39.61%	3,391	15.73%	1,086	5.04%	21,551

==== Counties that flipped from Republican to Democratic ====
- Esmeralda
- Lander
- Lincoln
- Lyon
- Storey
- Washoe

==== Counties that flipped from Democratic to Republican ====
- Douglas
