= Pat McCarran =

American judge and politician (1876–1954)

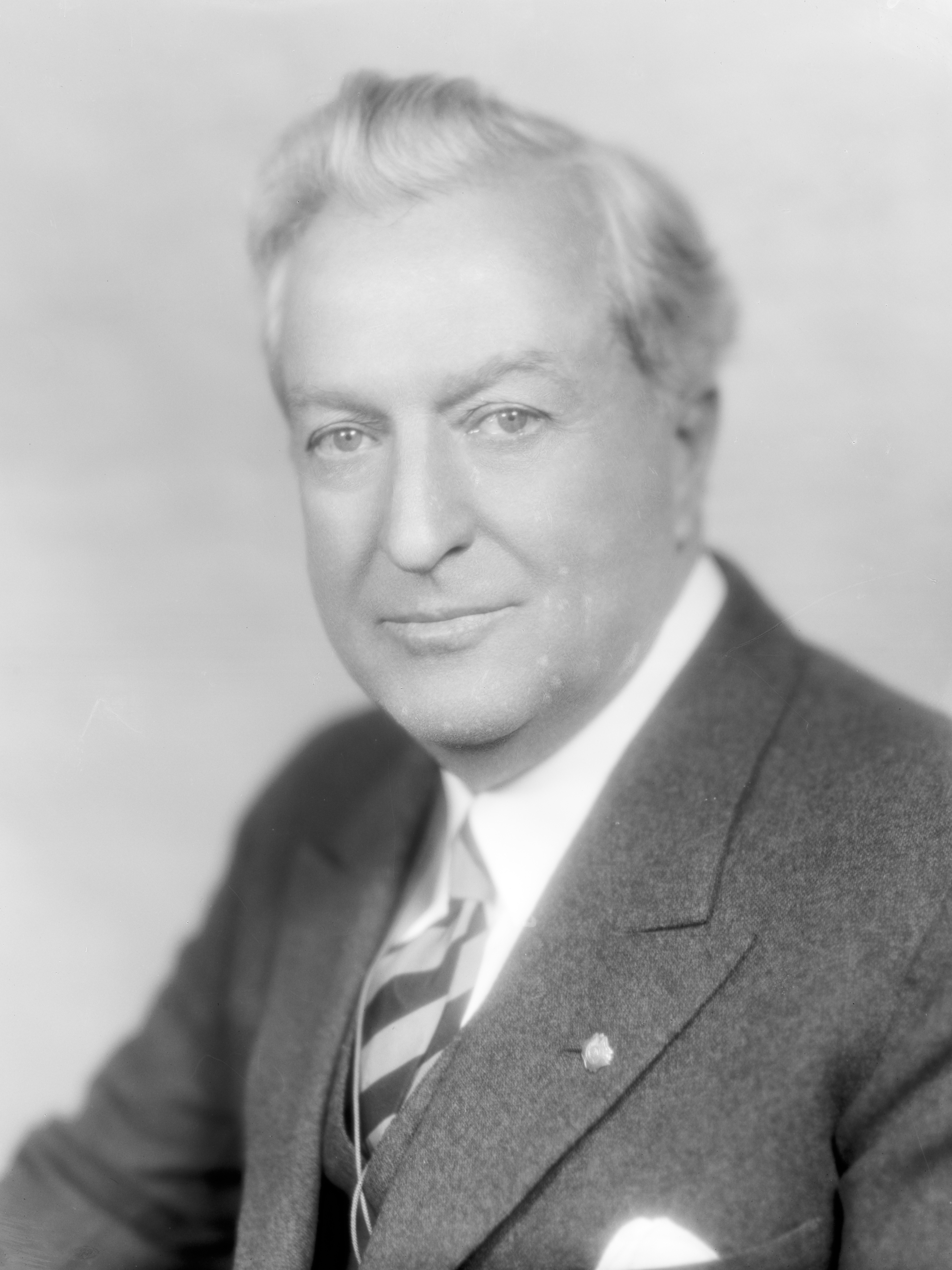

United States Senator from Nevada
- In office March 4, 1933 – September 28, 1954
- Preceded by: Tasker Oddie
- Succeeded by: Ernest S. Brown
Committee chairmanships
Chair of the Senate Judiciary Committee
In office January 3, 1949 – January 3, 1953
Preceded by	Alexander Wiley
Succeeded by	William Langer
In office January 3, 1945 – January 3, 1947
Preceded by	Frederick Van Nuys
Succeeded by	Alexander Wiley
Ranking Member of the Senate Judiciary Committee
In office January 3, 1953 – September 28, 1954
Preceded by	Alexander Wiley
Succeeded by	Alexander Wiley
In office January 3, 1947 – January 3, 1949
Succeeded by	Alexander Wiley

Chief Justice of the Supreme Court of Nevada
- In office January 2, 1917 – January 4, 1919
- Preceded by: Frank Herbert Norcross
- Succeeded by: Benjamin Wilson Coleman

Justice of the Supreme Court of Nevada
- In office January 2, 1913 – January 1, 1917
- Preceded by: James G. Sweeney
- Succeeded by: Edward A. Ducker

Nye County District Attorney
- In office 1907–1909
- Preceded by: W. B Pittman
- Succeeded by: Cleve H. Baker

Member of the Nevada Assembly from Washoe County
- In office 1903–1905 Serving with Peter Burke, W. D. R. Graham, H. R. Cooke, A. D. Graham, J. F. Crosby, J. E. Soucherau
- Preceded by: Phil Jacobs, G. E. Peckham, W. W. Webster
- Succeeded by: Walter Hastings, A. W. Holmes, E. R. Dodge, R. H. Kinney, J. W. Wright, J. S. Orr

Personal details
- Born: Patrick Anthony McCarran; August 8, 1876 Reno, Nevada, U.S.
- Died: September 28, 1954 (aged 78) Hawthorne, Nevada, U.S.
- Resting place: Mountain View Cemetery, Reno, Nevada
- Party: Democratic
- Spouse: Harriet Martha "Birdie" Weeks (m. 1903)
- Children: 5
- Profession: Attorney

Patrick Anthony McCarran (August 8, 1876 – September 28, 1954) was an American farmer, attorney, judge, and Democratic politician who represented Nevada in the United States Senate from 1933 until 1954. McCarran was in conflict with the Franklin Roosevelt administration over the New Deal and cooperation with the Soviet Union in World War II.

McCarran was born in Reno, Nevada, attended Nevada State University (now the University of Nevada, Reno), and was a farmer and rancher. In 1902, he won election to the Nevada Assembly but left office in 1905 after an unsuccessful campaign for the Nevada State Senate. He studied law privately and was admitted to the bar in 1905, then won election as Nye County District Attorney. He served a two-year term, after which he returned to Reno. From 1913 to 1919, McCarran was a justice of the Supreme Court of Nevada, serving as chief justice from 1917 to 1919. His support for the aviation industry was well known and resulted in Las Vegas's McCarran Field (now Harry Reid International Airport) being named in his honor.

In 1932, McCarran unseated incumbent Republican Tasker Oddie and in doing so became the state's first U.S. senator born in Nevada; he was reelected three times and served from 1933 until his death. In his Senate career, McCarran served as chairman of the committees on the District of Columbia, Judiciary, and Joint Foreign Economic Cooperation. As Senator, McCarran is remembered as one of the few Democrats to reject the Second New Deal. He sponsored the Civil Aeronautics Act of 1938 and was a proponent of establishing the United States Air Force. McCarran was a staunch anti-communist, to the point of supporting the Spanish dictator Francisco Franco. He sponsored the McCarran Internal Security Act, restricting the political activities of those supporting "totalitarian dictatorship" in the United States. Other significant legislation McCarran sponsored includes the Immigration and Nationality Act of 1952, sometimes referred to as the McCarran-Walter Act, and the McCarran–Ferguson Act, a landmark law exempting the insurance industry from federal regulation, and the 1946 Administrative Procedure Act, which McCarran described as "a Bill of Rights for the hundreds of thousands of Americans whose affairs are controlled or regulated" by federal agencies.

== Early life and education ==
McCarran was born in Reno, Nevada, to Irish immigrants Margaret Shay and Patrick McCarran. He was educated in Reno and graduated as valedictorian of the class of 1897 at Reno High School. McCarran's mother was a devout Catholic, and he inherited his mother's faith.

He attended Nevada State University (now the University of Nevada, Reno) but withdrew to work on the family sheep ranch after his father suffered an injury. Instead of returning to college, McCarran studied law with attorney William Woodburn.

Some sources incorrectly state that McCarran received a bachelor's degree in 1901 and a master's degree in 1915. In fact, he never received a bachelor's degree, and he was awarded an honorary Master of Arts from Nevada State University in 1915. He also received an honorary LL.D. from Georgetown University in 1943 and an honorary LL.D. from the University of Nevada in 1945.

== Nevada Assembly ==
McCarran ran for the Nevada Assembly in 1902 as a free silver Democrat with encouragement from his political science professor Anne Henrietta Martin. He was elected and served one term from 1903 to 1905. In 1904, he was an unsuccessful candidate for the Nevada State Senate.

He was admitted to the bar in 1905. In 1906, he was elected district attorney of Nye County. He served one term, 1907 to 1909, after which he moved to Reno to continue practicing law.

== Nevada Supreme Court ==
In 1912, McCarran was elected to the Supreme Court of Nevada, succeeding John G. Sweeney. He served as a justice from January 1913 to January 1917.

In January 1917, he succeeded Frank Herbert Norcross as chief justice. He was an unsuccessful candidate for reelection in 1918 and left office in January 1919.

== State government ==
Both during his time on the court and afterwards, McCarran continued to play a central role in Nevada's state government, as well as its legal and criminal justice systems. From 1913 to 1918, he served on the state Board of Library Commissioners. In addition, he served as chairman of the Nevada State University Board of Visitors.

During his time on the Court from 1913 to 1919, McCarran served on the state Board of Pardons. He was a member of the Board of Parole Commissioners from 1913 to 1918, and he served on the Board of Bar Examiners from 1919 until 1932.

McCarran was president of the Nevada Bar Association from 1920 to 1921 and was a vice president of the American Bar Association from 1922 to 1923.

== United States Senate ==
=== Electoral history ===
McCarran's ambition to serve as a U.S. Senator was well known in Nevada, and often the subject of commentary and jokes in the press. He ran unsuccessfully for the Democratic nomination in 1916, and lost to incumbent Key Pittman. McCarran endorsed Pittman in the general election, and Pittman was reelected.

In 1926, McCarran was again a candidate for the U.S. Senate. He lost the Democratic nomination to Raymond T. Baker, who was defeated by Republican incumbent Tasker Oddie in the general election.

In 1932, McCarran won the Democratic nomination and defeated Oddie in the general election. He was reelected in 1938, 1944, and 1950. He served from March 4, 1933, until his death in 1954.

In 1944, McCarran was challenged by Vail M. Pittman in the Democratic primary, leading to an especially hard-fought campaign that was finally won by McCarran. Pittman ascribed the result to McCarran's ability to bring federal money to fund infrastructure projects in Nevada:

McCarran had a pet project in nearly every town in the state. Housing projects, sewage systems, airfields, power projects, school houses and heaven knows what...People remember the little personal favors and the things that help financially, but they forgot all the things done that are more remote, but more vital.

McCarran's biographer Jerome Edwards endorsed this theory, arguing that the narrow margin suggests that a substantial number of registered Democrats in Nevada were dissatisfied with McCarran, but his ability to have the federal government built infrastructure projects that Nevada could not afford on its own explains his enduring appeal in his state.

=== Leadership positions ===
During his career as a Senator, McCarran served as chairman of the Senate Committees on the District of Columbia (77th and 78th Congresses) and Judiciary (78th, 79th, 81st, and 82nd Congresses). He also served as co-chairman of the Joint Committee on Foreign Economic Cooperation (81st United States Congress).

=== Opposition to Roosevelt administration ===
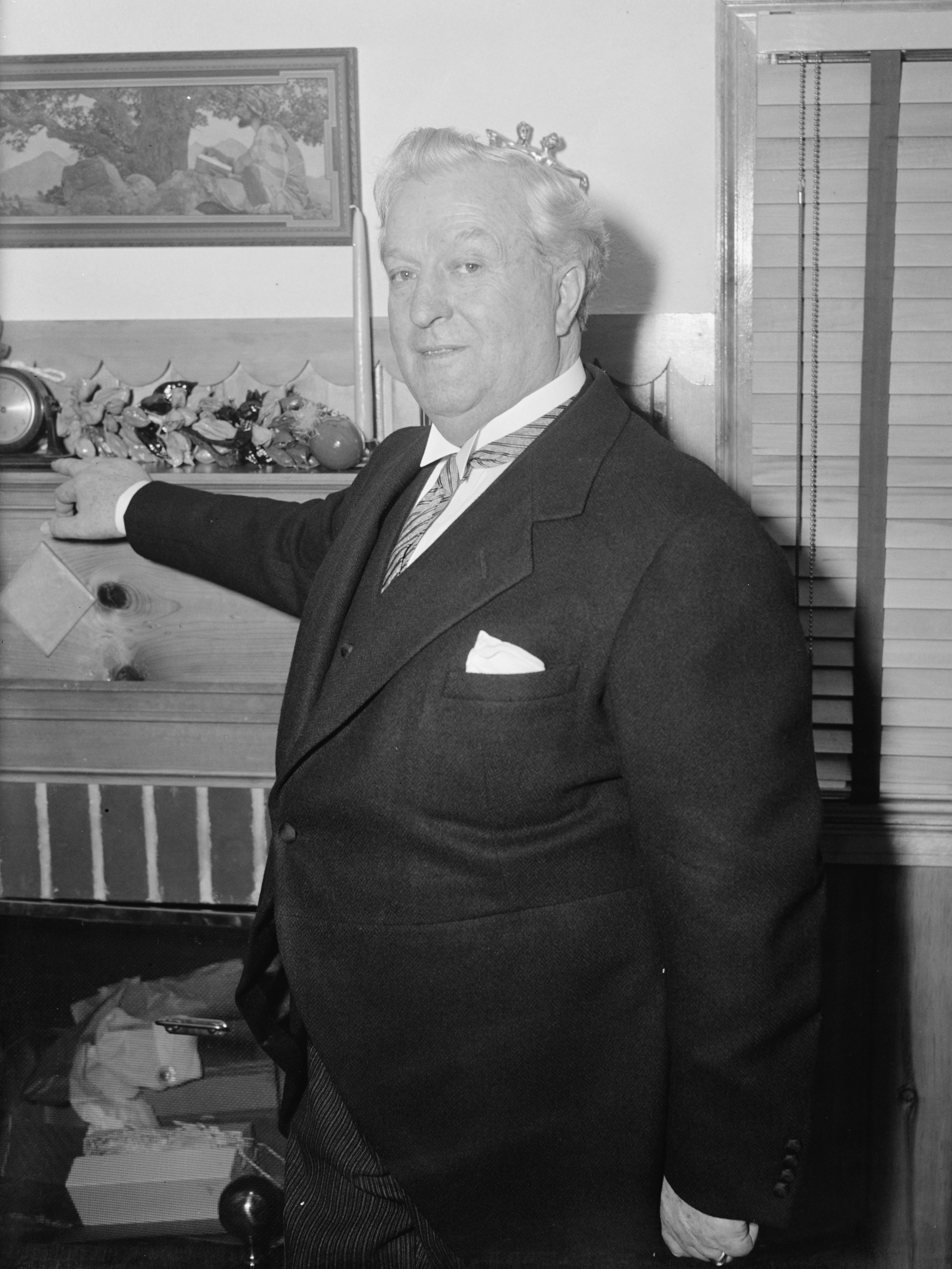
McCarran in April 1939

Although both were Democrats, McCarran came into increasing opposition with President Franklin D. Roosevelt over patronage decisions, the Second New Deal, and foreign policy.

During his first term, McCarran engaged in a major struggle for the control of patronage appointments relating to federal projects in Nevada with his Democratic colleague Key Pittman. As Nevada was a poor state and badly hit by the Great Depression, there was considerable competition for patronage appointments, and control of patronage was a major political tool. President Roosevelt tended to side with Pittman, the senior senator, in the struggle, thereby earning McCarran's enmity. Pittman's serious alcoholism rendered him less effective in his last years, and McCarran was able to become the dominant force within the Nevada Democratic Party by 1938.

In the late 1930s, McCarran criticized Roosevelt's "Second New Deal" programs as too liberal. Much of McCarran's opposition to the New Deal stemmed from his anger that New Deal programs increased Pittman's capacity for patronage appointments.

McCarran was also critical of Roosevelt's willingness to intervene in Europe, particularly in alliance with the Soviet Union. From 1939 to 1941, McCarran opposed Roosevelt's plans for aid to Great Britain, the Soviet Union, and France, accusing the president of trying to involve America in a war that was not its business. In particular, McCarran was outraged by the Roosevelt administration's offer of military and economic aid to the Soviet Union in the summer of 1941, arguing that it was immoral to assist "godless communists." In a speech on the Senate floor, McCarran declared that he despised both Adolf Hitler and Josef Stalin but regarded the Third Reich as the lesser evil and felt it was therefore profoundly wrong for the United States to aid the Soviet Union. McCarran was greatly influenced by Pope Pius XI's anti-communist Divini Redemptoris encyclical in spring 1937, declaring that "Communism is intrinsically wrong, and no one who would save Christian civilization may collaborate with it in any undertaking."

McCarran supported the war effort after the United States entered the conflict following the Japanese attack on Pearl Harbor.

McCarran's positions on several key committees, most notably Appropriations and Judiciary, gave him significant influence that he used to obtain federal funding for Nevada. Outside of Nevada, McCarran had the reputation of a narrow-minded and parochial senator; the same reasons that made him unpopular outside of Nevada made him popular to Nevadans as he developed the reputation of a dogged fighter for Nevada's interests. McCarran repeatedly attempted via filibusters to force the federal government to stockpile silver, a measure that would have benefited Nevada where silver mining was a major industry, but was widely denounced outside of Nevada as a plan for wasteful spending designed only to benefit his state. After Pearl Harbor, McCarran made much in his Senate speeches to the Senate of the fact that most of American industry was concentrated in the Northeast and the Midwest, and argued that the federal government had a duty to ensure that war production was shifted to less industrialized states like Nevada.

When Felix Frankfurter became the second Supreme Court nominee to testify in person before the Judiciary Committee, and the first Jewish one, McCarran "used the occasion to launch a nasty, sneering attack on the nominee, filled with innuendo about Frankfurter's foreign origins and alleged radical associations."

McCarran was well known for his efforts at constituent services, often going to extraordinary lengths on behalf of Nevada residents who requested his aid. For instance, McCarran intervened to shield a teenager from Nevada who stole 150 volumes from the Library of Congress and mutilated hundreds of books. In 1942, McCarran pressured the State Department to engage in a prisoner exchange to return the son of a Reno couple who had been captured by the Japanese at Wake Island. McCarran's reputation as a man who could "get things done" translated into substantial support at the polls.

In the 1940s and 1950s, 40 percent of Senate bills had to first be approved by the Senate Judiciary committee, giving McCarran immense power as he could easily kill these bills in his committee. Other committee chairmen had the same powers over bills related to their fields, but the number of bills that had to be passed by the Judiciary Committee made McCarran far more influential than the other senate committee chairmen. Over time, McCarran used his position as chairman of the Judiciary Committee to engage in much deal-making that allowed him to collect a significant number of political "debts", making him one of the most powerful Senators. McCarran's conservative politics, which pitted him against first Roosevelt and then Harry S. Truman, frequently led to him being asked why he continued as a Democrat instead of defecting to the Republicans. In 1950, when McCarran was asked that question by a reporter, he responded: "I can do more good by staying in the Democratic Party and watching the lunatic fringe--the Roosevelt crowd". McCarran was against the plans of the Roosevelt and Truman administrations for federal health insurance and increased education spending; favored restricting the power of unions; was opposed to increased immigration, saying he did not want "undesirables from abroad" coming to America; and was against the United Nations, which he called "a haven for spies and Communists". As chairman of the Judiciary Committee, he appointed his friend, Senator James Eastland, a well known white supremacist and segregationist, as chairman of the Senate Subcommittee on Civil Rights. Such was McCarran's power that in July 1952, the liberal Washington Post newspaper (which was not friendly to the conservative McCarran) declared in an article: "It sums the character of this congress to state an unquestionable fact: that its most important member was Patrick A. McCarran".

=== Aviation advocate ===
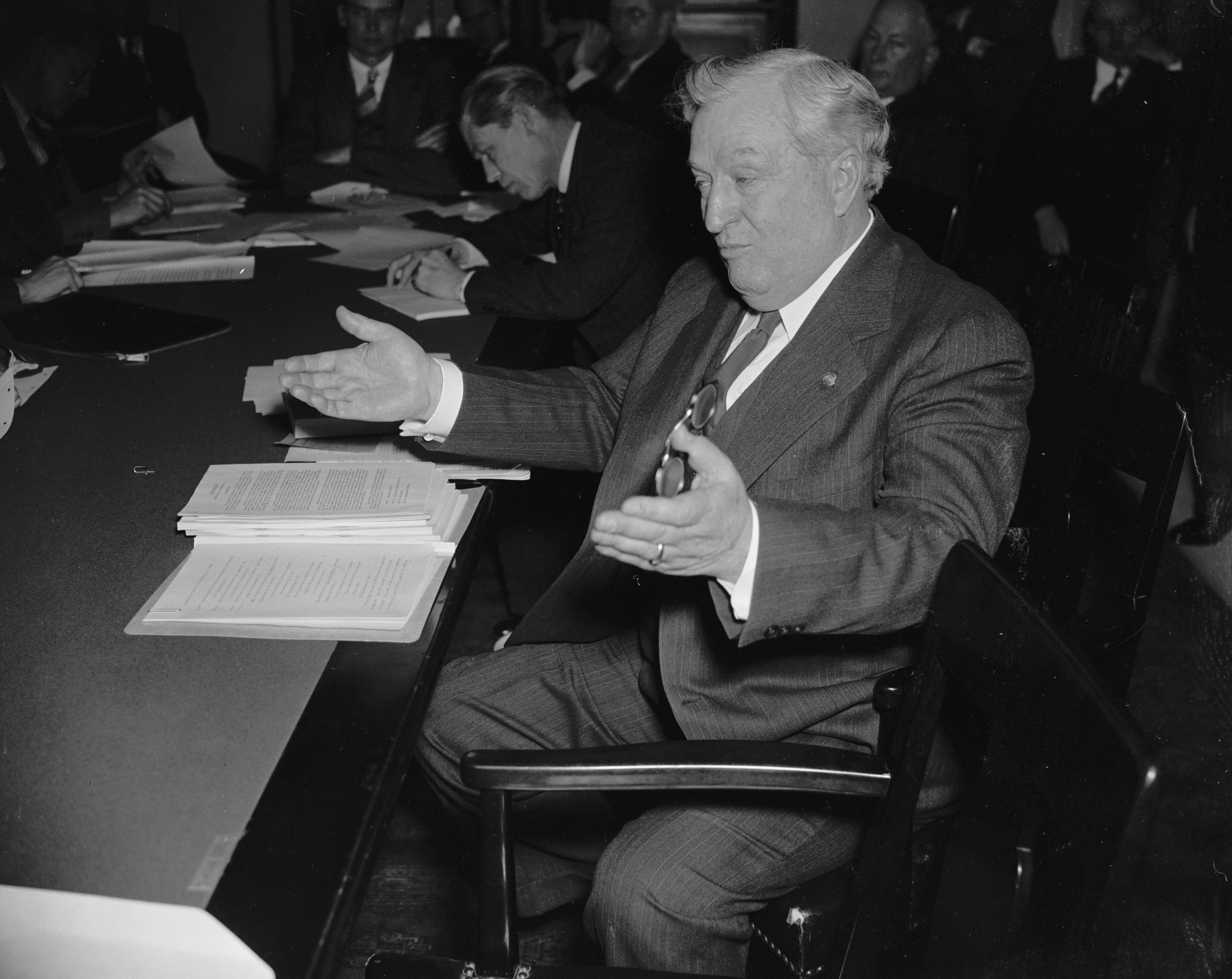
McCarran advocating for the Civil Aeronautics Act during 1938

McCarran sponsored numerous laws concerning the early commercial aviation industry, including the Civil Aeronautics Act of 1938 and the Federal Airport Act of 1945. He was an early advocate of separating the United States Army Air Forces from the Army as the Air Force and began sponsoring the necessary legislation in 1933.

=== Other initiatives ===
In 1945, McCarran co-sponsored the McCarran-Ferguson Act, which exempted the insurance industry from most federal regulations, including antitrust rules. Instead, this act required states to regulate insurance, including mandatory licensing requirements.

McCarran also co-sponsored the 1946 Administrative Procedure Act, which required federal agencies to keep the public informed of their organizational structure, procedures and rules, allowed for public participation in the rule making process, and established uniform standards for the conduct of formal rule making.

=== Anti-communism ===
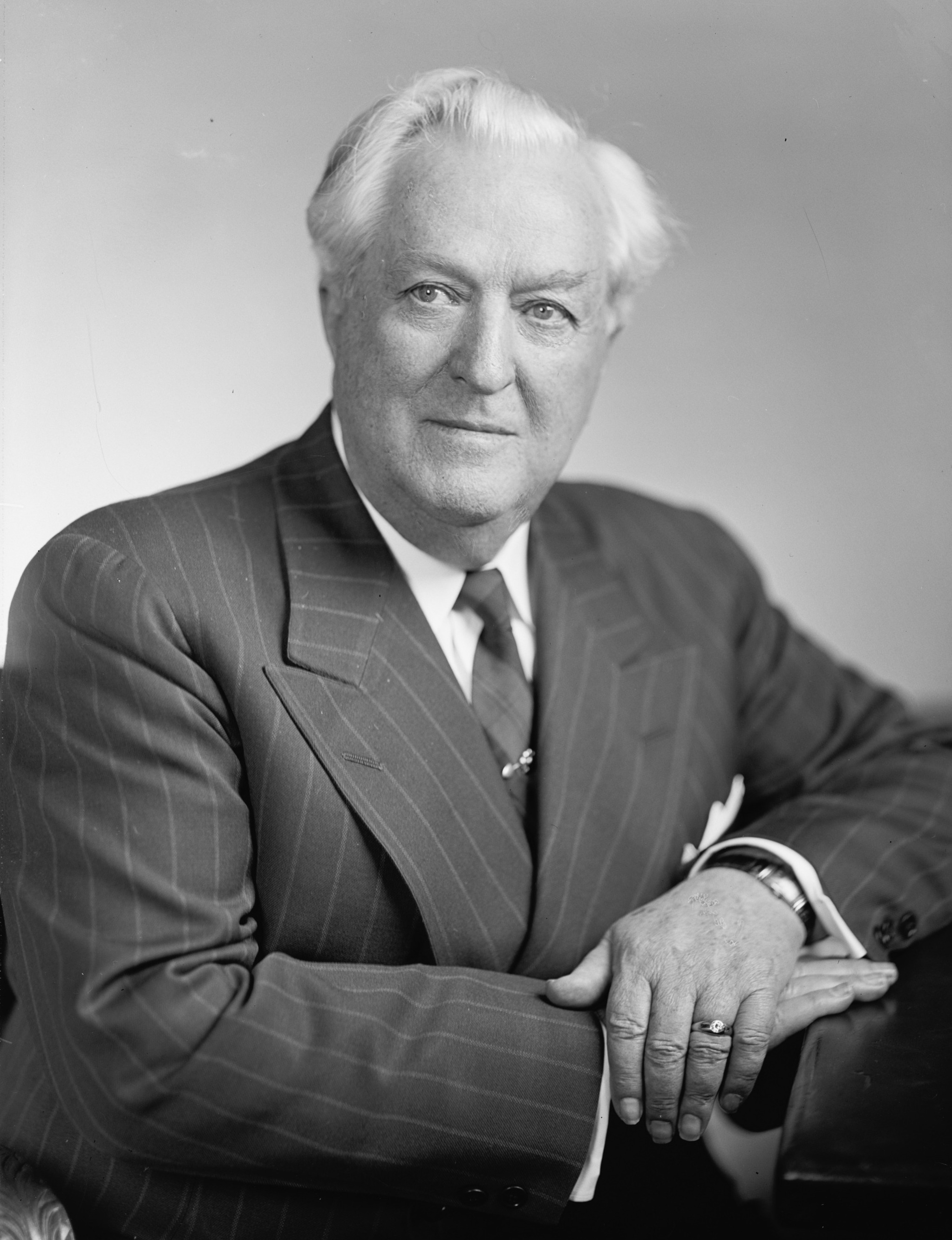
McCarran Senate photo 1947

McCarran established himself as one of the Senate's most ardent anti-Communists. An admirer of Spanish dictator Francisco Franco, he was nicknamed the "Senator from Madrid" by columnist Drew Pearson over his efforts to increase foreign aid to Spain. McCarran voted for President Truman's 1947 plan to provide aid to Greece and Turkey as part of an effort to prevent them from becoming communist, but in 1949 McCarran broke with Truman after he rejected McCarran's request for increased economic aid to Spain and military aid to Chiang Kai-shek's nationalist Chinese government. In 1949, McCarran visited Spain, where he was welcomed as if he were a visiting head of state, and made clear his admiration for Franco. McCarran's praise for Franco greatly annoyed Truman. During his visit to Spain, McCarran discussed potential U.S. aid for Franco, infuriating Truman, who angrily declared that McCarran did not have the right to conduct his own foreign policy.

After World War II, McCarran continued his anti-Communist efforts. He was a supporter of Chiang Kai-shek and attributed the "loss of China" to communists to Soviet influence in the U.S. State Department. In 1952, McCarran and Republican Senators Joseph McCarthy and William Knowland attended a dinner hosted by the Kuomintang Ambassador to Washington, toasting "Back to the mainland!" McCarthy sought McCarran's favor after he started his "crusade against Communism." McCarran privately told friends that "Joe is a bit irresponsible" and a "publicity hound," but praised him for his attacks on the Truman administration. In 1951, in an interview with the U.S. News, McCarran expressed his belief that the American Communist Party had engaged in "infiltration" of the media, churches, university faculties, unions and "nationality groups."

In 1950, McCarran was the chief sponsor of the McCarran Internal Security Act, which required the Communist Party and affiliated organizations to register with the Attorney General and established the Subversive Activities Control Board to investigate possible communist subversion and communist front organizations. The act also gave the government power to imprison people "likely" to be spies, saboteurs, and "subversives" without trial (though those imprisoned could appeal to a review board) if the president declared a national emergency. President Truman vetoed the act, charging that it violated civil liberties and put the government in "the business of thought control," but Congress overrode Truman's veto. No such emergency was ever declared and the six camps built for this purpose by the Federal Bureau of Prisons were never used before being shut down in 1957. The act was never enforced due to numerous hearings, delays and appeals before its major provisions were held unconstitutional by the United States Supreme Court in 1965 and 1967.

As chairman of the Judiciary Committee, McCarran created and chaired the Senate Internal Security Subcommittee to investigate supposed communist spies and sympathizers within the Franklin D. Roosevelt and Harry S. Truman administrations. In acrimonious hearings in February 1951, McCarran questioned Institute of Pacific Relations researcher Owen Lattimore, whom Senator McCarthy accused of being the "top Russian agent" responsible for the "loss of China." During the hearings, McCarran and Lattimore frequently engaged in shouting matches and interrupted one another. At the end of the hearings, McCarran stated Lattimore was "so flagrantly defiant" and "so persistent in his efforts to confuse and obscure the facts that the committee feels constrained to take due notice of his conduct ... That he has uttered untruths stands clear in the record." The subcommittee report written by McCarran concluded that China was indeed "lost" because of the policy followed by the State Department, declaring, "Owen Lattimore and John Carter Vincent were influential in bringing about a change in United States policy... favorable to the Chinese Communists". McCarran was careful not to accuse Lattimore of espionage, which would have allowed him to sue for libel, but came very close with the statement: "Owen Lattimore was, from some time beginning in the 1930s, a conscious, articulate instrument of the Soviet conspiracy". McCarran subsequently pushed successfully for Lattimore to be indicted for perjury.

External videos
- Presentation by Ybarra on Washington Gone Crazy, November 13, 2004, C-SPAN

Biographer Michael Ybarra asserted in his book Washington Gone Crazy: Senator Pat McCarran and the Great American Communist Hunt that "arguably no American wrecked as many lives as did the great Red hunter from Nevada."

As chairman of the Judiciary Committee, he held up the nomination of Truman's nominee for Attorney General, James McGranery, until McGanery promised to indict Lattimore. Lattimore's lawyer Abe Fortas defended him by claiming McCarran had deliberately asked questions about arcane and obscure matters that took place in the 1930s in the hope that Lattimore would not be able to recall them properly, thereby giving grounds for perjury indictments. Federal Judge Luther Youngdahl later dismissed all seven charges against Lattimore on the grounds that the matters in question were insubstantial, of little concern to McCarran's inquiry, or the result of questions phrased in such a way that they could not be fairly answered.

On July 27, 1953, the armistice of Panmunjom was signed ending the Korean War. McCarran attracted national attention when he criticized President Dwight Eisenhower on the Senate floor for signing the armistice, which he called "a perpetuation of a fraud on this country and the United Nations". McCarran believed that the United States and the rest of its allies fighting under the United Nations banner in Korea should have fought on until all of Korea was unified under the leadership of President Syngman Rhee, which led him to see the armistice as a sort of American defeat.

=== Immigration ===
In June 1952, McCarran joined Francis Walter in sponsorship of the McCarran–Walter Act, a law that abolished racial restrictions found in United States immigration and naturalization statutes going back to the Naturalization Act of 1790 and also imposed more rigid restrictions on quotas for immigrants entering the United States. McCarran's antisemitism was also reflected in his view on immigration; he actively opposed efforts to permit survivors of the Holocaust to come to the United States. The Act also stiffened the existing law relating to the admission, exclusion and deportation of dangerous aliens under the McCarran Internal Security Act. Of the Act, McCarran said:

I believe that this nation is the last hope of Western civilization and if this oasis of the world shall be overrun, perverted, contaminated or destroyed, then the last flickering light of humanity will be extinguished. I take no issue with those who would praise the contributions which have been made to our society by people of many races, of varied creeds and colors. America is indeed a joining together of many streams which go to form a mighty river which we call the American way. However, we have in the United States today hard-core, indigestible blocs which have not become integrated into the American way of life, but which, on the contrary are its deadly enemies. Today, as never before, untold millions are storming our gates for admission and those gates are cracking under the strain. The solution of the problems of Europe and Asia will not come through a transplanting of those problems en masse to the United States.... I do not intend to become prophetic, but if the enemies of this legislation succeed in riddling it to pieces, or in amending it beyond recognition, they will have contributed more to promote this nation's downfall than any other group since we achieved our independence as a nation.

Some of the immigration provisions of the act were later superseded by the 1965 Immigration Act, but the power of the government to deny visas for ideological reasons remained on the books another 25 years after that.

== Personal life ==
In 1903, McCarran married Harriet Martha "Birdie" Weeks (1882–1963). They were the parents of four daughters and one son. Samuel McCarran became a doctor and worked in Reno. Margaret and Mary became members of the Order of Dominican Sisters. Norine was a longtime employee of the Library of Congress. Patricia became the wife of Edwin Parry Hay of Maryland. Mary left the order in 1957 and became an investment broker, art studio owner, and author.

== Death and burial ==
McCarran died in Hawthorne, Nevada, on September 28, 1954, collapsing of a heart attack following a speech he gave at a political rally. McCarran was buried at Mountain View Cemetery in Reno.

== Legacy ==
McCarran is remembered as one of the few Democrats to oppose President Franklin D. Roosevelt and reject the New Deal. In addition, he was a proponent of the aviation industry; he was a sponsor of the Civil Aeronautics Act of 1938 and the Federal Airport Act of 1945, and was a proponent of establishing the United States Air Force separate from the Army. In recent years he has been accused of racism, antisemitism, and xenophobia. His strident anti-communism matched that of Joseph McCarthy.

Harold L. Ickes described McCarran as "easy-going, old-shoe 'Pat'" in a column criticizing McCarran as a tool of the oil companies. American journalist John Gunther was also critical of McCarran's alleged corporate ties, writing that he resembled gold "in that he is soft, heavy, and not a good conductor."

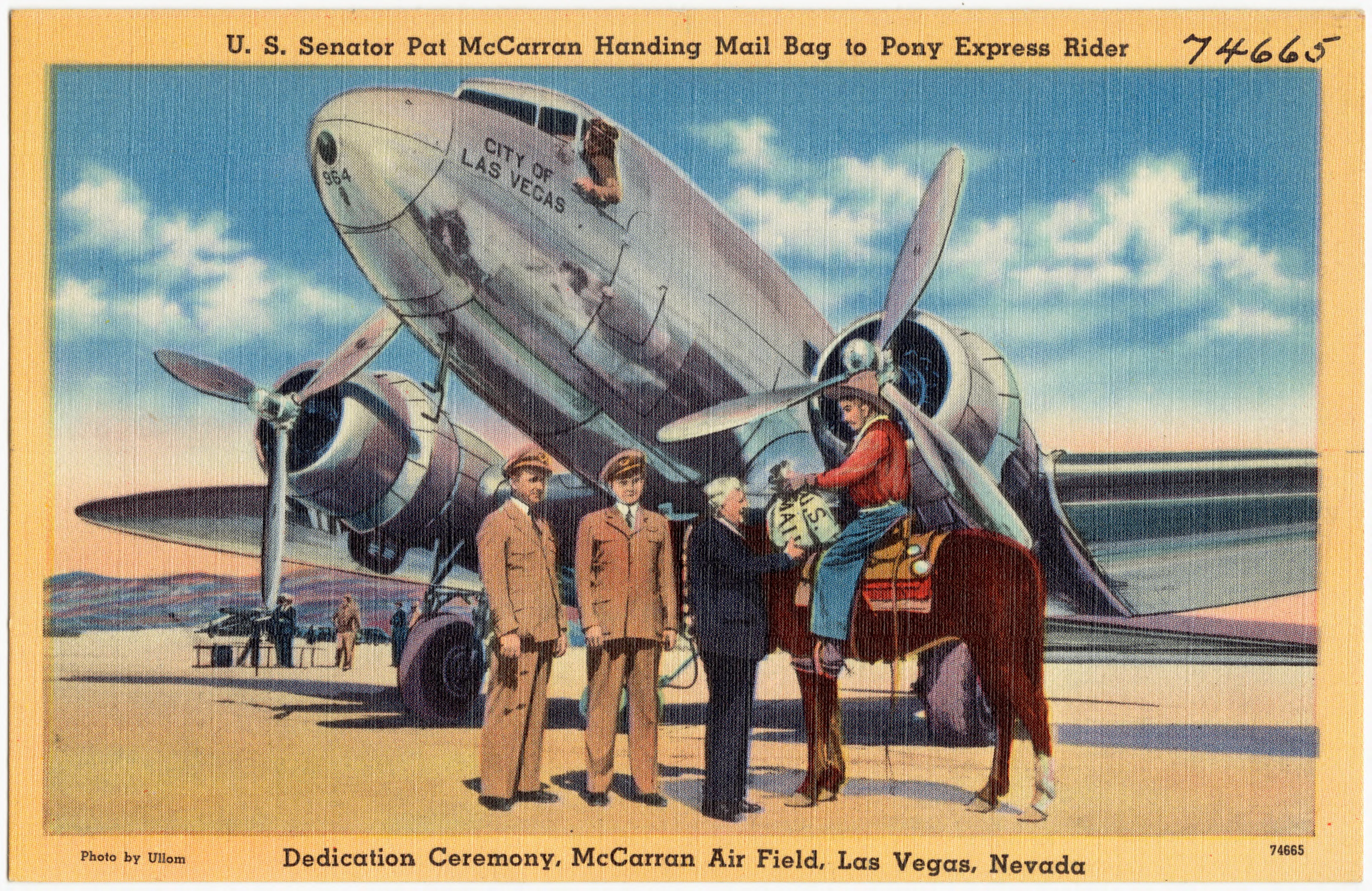
Postcard depicting McCarran at the dedication ceremony for the original McCarran Field, now Nellis Air Force Base

McCarran Boulevard in Reno is named for Pat McCarran, as is McCarran Street in North Las Vegas.

Harry Reid International Airport in Las Vegas was named after Senator McCarran prior to December 14, 2021. For some time, many Nevada politicians had supported removing his name from the airport due to his antisemitic and racist beliefs. U.S. Senator Harry Reid said McCarran was "one of the most prejudiced people who has ever served in the Senate." On February 16, 2021, the Clark County Commissioners voted unanimously to officially change the name of McCarran International Airport to Harry Reid International Airport. The name change took place after federal approval and just before Reid's death.

=== National Statuary Hall and controversy ===
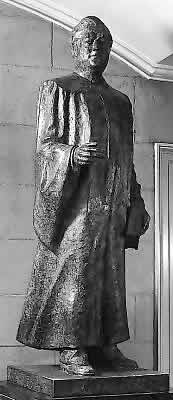
Statue in the National Statuary Hall Collection

A statue of McCarran is included in the National Statuary Hall Collection at the United States Capitol. Each state is allowed to display likenesses of two individuals; Nevada's are those of McCarran and Sarah Winnemucca.

In 2017, Nevada's three Democratic members of the U.S. House of Representatives wrote to Governor Brian Sandoval and state legislative leaders and stated their view that review of McCarran's career might warrant removal of his statue from the National Statuary Hall Collection.

"While he fought for workers' rights and helped shape the country's aviation industry, McCarran left a legacy of racism, xenophobia and anti-Semitism" - letter sent by Reps. Dina Titus, Ruben Kihuen and Jacky Rosen.

In January 2017, a poll of Nevada legislators indicated support for removing McCarran's statue from the collection. A bill introduced in the Nevada State Senate, SB 174, which called for the removal of the statue and renaming of McCarran International Airport for former U.S. Senator Harry Reid, failed to be passed before the end of the 2017 legislative session on June 1, 2017.

=== Popular culture ===
- Cartoonist Walt Kelly introduced a character into his Pogo comic strip called Mole MacCaroney. Mole's near-blindness and concerns about "germs" were seen as a hostile reference to McCarran and his immigration restriction policies.
- McCarran was in part the inspiration for the fictional character of the corrupt United States Senator Pat Geary in the film The Godfather Part II.
- McCarran's chair from his tenure in the U.S. Senate was featured in a 2011 episode of the History Channel reality television series Pawn Stars.

== See also ==
- List of members of the United States Congress who died in office (1950–1999)

Party political offices
Preceded by Raymond T. Baker	Democratic nominee for U.S. Senator from Nevada (Class 3); 1932, 1938, 1944, 1950	Succeeded by Alan Bible
U.S. Senate
Preceded by Tasker Oddie	U.S. senator (Class 3) from Nevada; 1933–1954; Served alongside: Key Pittman, Berkeley L. Bunker, James G. Scrugham, Edward P. Carville, George W. Malone	Succeeded by Ernest S. Brown
Political offices
Preceded by William H. King; Utah	Chairman of the Senate District of Columbia Committee; 1941–1945	Succeeded by Theodore G. Bilbo; Mississippi
Preceded by Frederick Van Nuys; Indiana	Chairman of the Senate Judiciary Committee; 1945–1947	Succeeded by Alexander Wiley; Wisconsin
Preceded by Alexander Wiley; Wisconsin	Chairman of the Senate Judiciary Committee; 1949–1953	Succeeded by William Langer; North Dakota
