= 1916 United States Senate election in Nevada =

- November 7, 1916
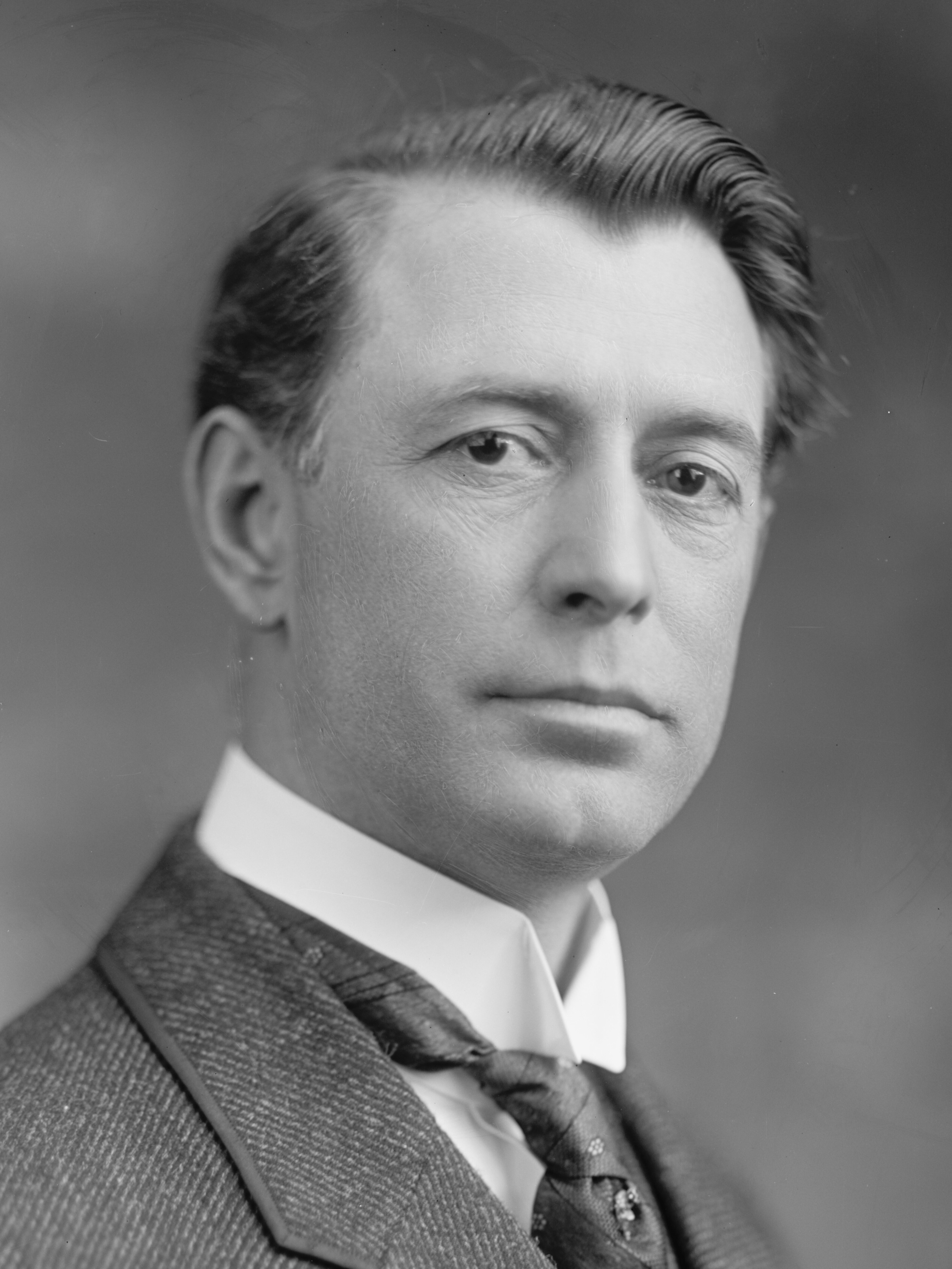

Nominee	Key Pittman	Samuel Platt	Ashley Grant Miller
Party	Democratic	Republican	Socialist
Popular vote	12,765	10,618	9,507
Percentage	38.81%	32.28%	28.91%
- County results Pittman: 30–40% 40–50% Platt: 30–40% 40–50% Miller: 30–40% 40–50%
U.S. senator before election
Key Pittman
Democratic
Elected U.S. Senator
Key Pittman
Democratic

The 1916 United States Senate election in Nevada took place on November 7, 1916. Incumbent Democratic Senator Key Pittman, who had previously won a partial term in a special election in 1912 after Senator George S. Nixon died, won re-election to a full term in a three-way election against Sam Platt and Socialist candidate Ashley Grant Miller.

== Primary elections ==
No primaries happened in this election. In 1916, Nevada decided on its candidates with party conventions, not primaries.

=== Democratic convention ===
==== Candidates ====
- Key Pittman, incumbent U.S. Senator

=== Republican convention ===
==== Candidates ====
- Samuel Platt, former Speaker of the Nevada House of Representatives (1905-1907) and candidate for Nevada's other Senate seat in 1914

== General election ==
=== Results ===
1916 United States Senate election in Nevada
Party	Candidate	Votes	%
Democratic	Key Pittman (incumbent)	12,765	38.81
Republican	Samuel Platt	10,618	32.28
Socialist	Ashley Grant Miller	9,507	28.91
Majority		2,147	6.53
Turnout		32,890	
Democratic hold			
