= Statue of Pat McCarran =

Bronze sculpture by Yolande Jacobson

Pat McCarran
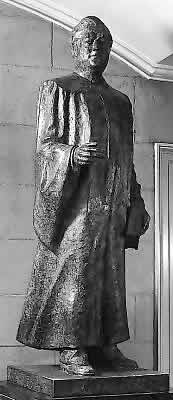
- Artist: Yolande Jacobson
- Medium: Bronze sculpture
- Subject: Pat McCarran
- Location: Washington, D.C., United States

Pat McCarran, or Patrick A. McCarran, is a bronze sculpture depicting the United States Senator from Nevada of the same name by Yolande Jacobson, installed in the United States Capitol's Hall of Columns, in Washington, D.C., as part of the National Statuary Hall Collection. The statue was donated by the U.S. state of Nevada in 1960.
