= Tasker Oddie =

American politician

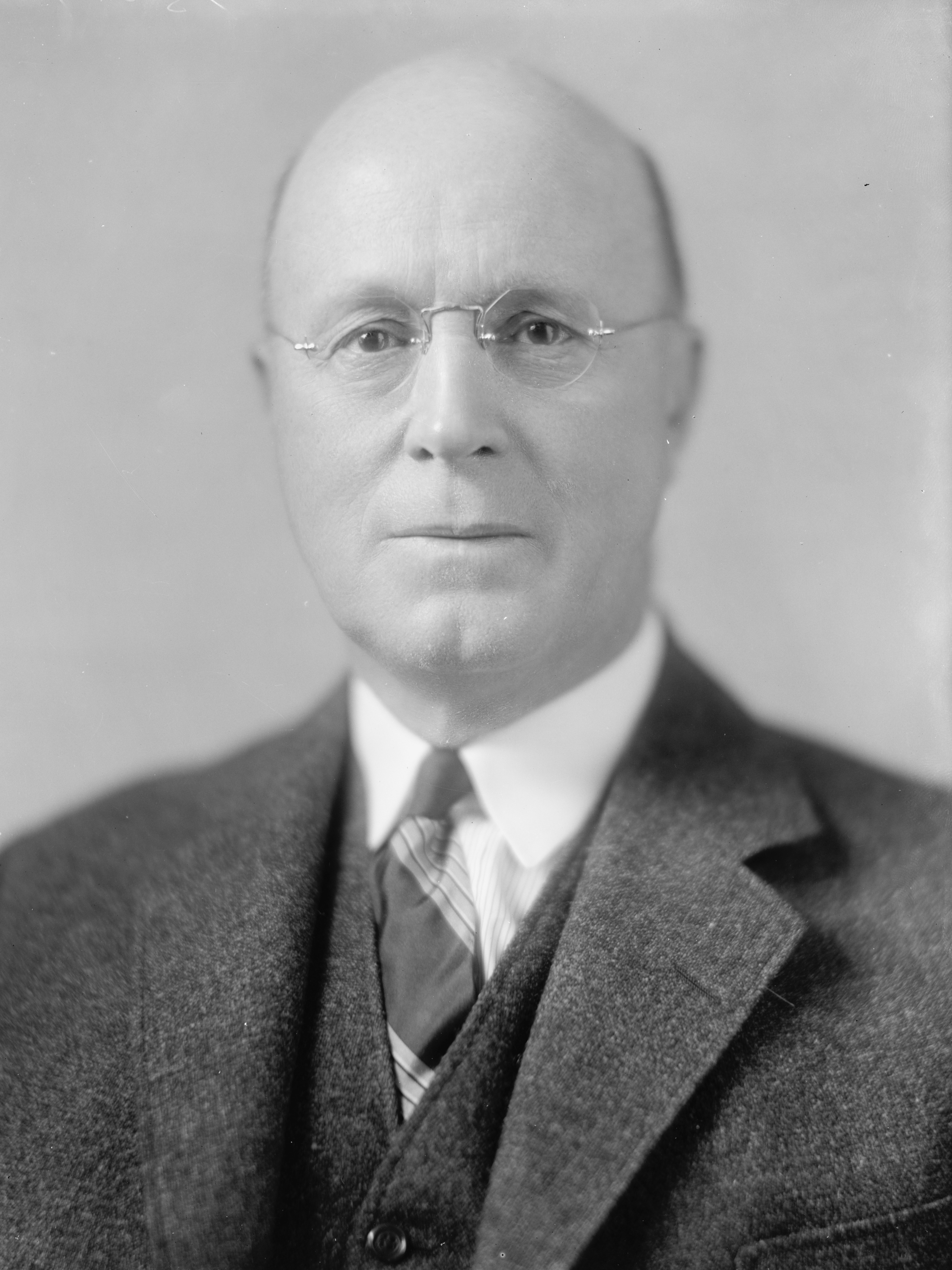

United States Senator from Nevada
- In office March 4, 1921 – March 3, 1933
- Preceded by: Charles B. Henderson
- Succeeded by: Pat McCarran

12th Governor of Nevada
- In office January 2, 1911 – January 4, 1915
- Lieutenant: Gilbert C. Ross
- Preceded by: Denver S. Dickerson
- Succeeded by: Emmet D. Boyle

Member of the Nevada Senate from Nye County
- In office 1905–1909
- Preceded by: Thomas Bell
- Succeeded by: Clay Tallman, Zeb Kendall

District Attorney of Nye County, Nevada
- In office 1901–1903
- Preceded by: James L. Butler
- Succeeded by: Charles L. Richards

Personal details
- Born: Tasker Lowndes Oddie; October 20, 1870 Brooklyn, New York, U.S.
- Died: February 17, 1950 (aged 79) San Francisco, California, U.S.
- Resting place: Lone Mountain Cemetery; Carson City, Nevada
- Party: Republican
- Spouse(s): Claire Gardner MacDonald (m. 1903); Daisy Rendall MacKeigan (m. 1916)
- Education: New York University School of Law
- Profession: Attorney

Tasker Lowndes Oddie (October 20, 1870 – February 17, 1950) was an American attorney and politician who served as the 12th governor of Nevada and a United States Senator. He was a member of the Republican Party.

A native of Brooklyn, New York, Oddie was educated in Brooklyn, then lived and worked for several years in Nebraska and East Orange, New Jersey. After graduating from New York University School of Law in 1895 and practicing law in New York City, in 1898 he moved to Nevada. He worked in Nevada as the attorney and business agent for wealthy businessman Anson Phelps Stokes, and became active in silver and gold mining. Oddie's mining investments made him wealthy, and he expanded his holdings to include ownership takes in farms, railroads, banks, and cattle ranches.

A Republican, Oddie served as school superintendent and district attorney of Nye County from 1901 to 1903, and was a member of the state senate from 1905 to 1909. Oddie was elected governor in 1910, and served from 1911 to 1915. After running unsuccessfully for governor in 1914 and 1918, in 1920 he won election to the U.S. Senate. He was reelected in 1926, and served from 1921 to 1933. Oddie was defeated for reelection in 1932, and for election to the senate in 1938.

In retirement, Oddie spent winters in San Francisco and summers in Nevada. He died in San Francisco on February 17, 1950, and was buried at Lone Mountain Cemetery in Carson City, Nevada.

== Early life ==
Tasker Oddie was born in Brooklyn, New York on October 20, 1870, the son of Henry Meigs Oddie and Ellen Gibson (Prout) Oddie. He attended the public schools of Brooklyn until he was 16, when ill health caused him to travel to Nebraska. He remained there until 1894, and worked for several years as a cowboy. Upon returning east, he settled in East Orange, New Jersey, where he became active in the real estate business. He later became a clerk for a New York City wholesale importing firm, followed by work as the assistant manager of the estate of Isaac Newton Phelps, who had died in 1888, and John Bond Trevor, who had died in 1890.

While managing the Trevor estate, Oddie attended New York University School of Law at night, and graduated with an LL.B. in 1895. He was admitted to the bar the same year, and practiced in New York until 1898, when he moved to Nevada. While living in New Jersey, Oddie also served for three years as a member of the state's militia's Essex Troop of cavalry. He volunteered for the Spanish–American War, but the troop was not called up, and he resigned when he moved to Nevada.

Oddie relocated to Nevada become the attorney and business agent for wealthy businessman Anson Phelps Stokes. He managed Stokes' real estate, banking, railroad, and mining operations for several years, in addition to becoming active in mining in his own right. As the business partner of Jim Butler, the founder of Tonopah, Nevada, and Wilson Brougher, owner of Carson City's Brougher Mansion, Oddie became wealthy as the developer and manager of gold and silver mines, railroads, cattle ranches, and farms.

== Continued career ==
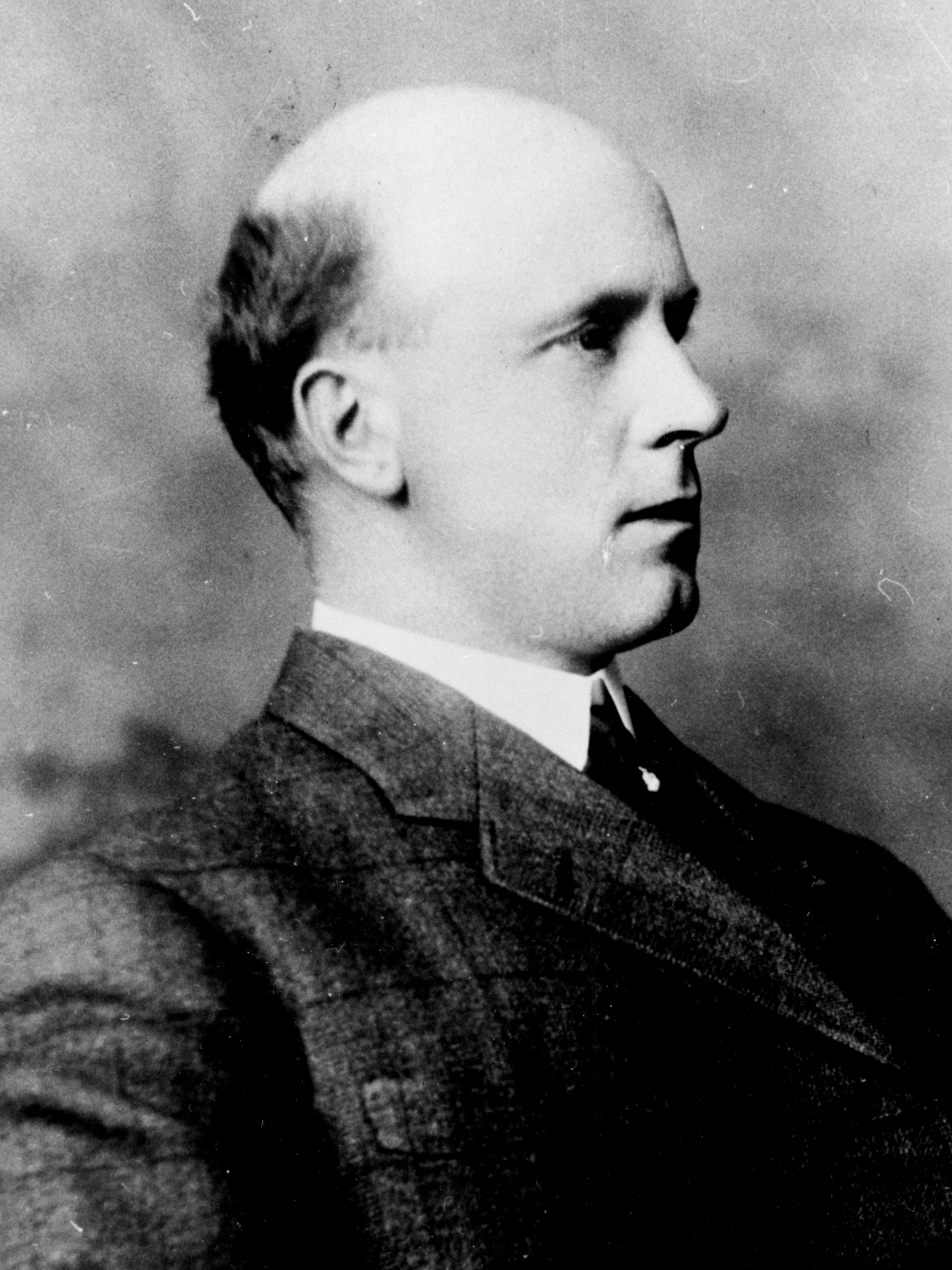
Oddie as governor of Nevada, c. 1911–1914.

A Republican, Oddie was the Nye County School Superintendent and District Attorney from 1901 to 1903. He was a member of the Nevada State Senate from 1905 to 1909.

In 1910, Oddie was the successful Republican nominee for governor, and he served from 1911 to 1915. As a Progressive Republican, Oddie advocated for worker's compensation, mine safety, and an eight hour workday. In addition, women received the right to vote in local elections, and the state's first laws regulating motor vehicles were enacted. On March 17, 1911, he signed the city charter for Las Vegas, the first incorporated city in the state.

Because he was not married during his governorship, Oddie's mother Ellen and his sisters acted as official hostesses. Oddie was an unsuccessful candidate for reelection in 1914 and returned to his business interests. He ran for governor unsuccessfully in 1918.

During World War I, Oddie was chairman of Nevada's transportation committee, war industries board, and council of national defense. His continued business interests included serving as president of the Tonopah City Mining Company and the Nye County Bank. In addition, he was an executive or manager of the Tonopah Belmont Development Company, Tonopah City Mining Company, Tonopah Fraction Mining Company, and Gold Hill Mining Company.

== U.S. Senator ==
In 1920, Oddie staged a political comeback by winning election to the U.S. Senate. He was reelected in 1926, and served from March 4, 1921, to March 3, 1933. During his senate career, Oddie was chairman of the Committee On Mines and Mining (68th through 71st Congresses), and the Committee On Post Offices and Post Roads (72nd Congress).

Oddie clashed in the senate with Hiram Johnson of California over the location of the proposed San Francisco–Oakland Bay Bridge. San Francisco area businessmen, in conjunction with Johnson, argued in favor of a location that Oddie believed would disadvantage the United States Navy by destroying anchorages for warships. Subsequent negotiations resulted in the selection of a site that protected the navy's interests.

Oddie was an unsuccessful candidate for reelection in 1932, and for election in 1938. After leaving the senate, he resumed his business interests, including serving as president of the Gold Mining Association of America and the Nevada Mine Owners' Association.

== Later life, death, and legacy ==
In his later years, Oddie and his wife spent winters in San Francisco and summers in Nevada. Oddie was a member of the American Institute of Mining Engineers and American Cattle Breeders Association. He belonged to the Alta Club of Salt Lake City and the Bohemian Club of San Francisco. Oddie was a Mason, and attained the 32nd degree of the Scottish Rite. He was a member of the Knights Templar, the Elks, and the Episcopal Church.

Oddie died in San Francisco on February 17, 1950. He was interred at Lone Mountain Cemetery, Carson City, Nevada.

Mount Oddie near Tonopah is named after Oddie, as is Oddie Boulevard in Reno and Sparks. Oddie's Tonopah home, the Uri B. Curtis House–Tasker L. Oddie House, was added to the National Register of Historic Places in 1982.

== Family ==
In December 1903, Oddie married Claire Gardner MacDonald; they divorced in November 1904. In November 1916, he married Daisy Rendall MacKeigan, and they were married until his death. Oddie had no children with either wife.

Oddie was a descendant of several prominent American families; Henry Meigs was his great-grandfather, and Henry Meigs Jr. was his grand-uncle. Other direct ancestors and extended family included Benjamin Stoddert, Benjamin Tasker Sr., and Christopher Lowndes.

Party political offices
Preceded by James F. Mitchell	Republican nominee for Governor of Nevada; 1910, 1914, 1918	Succeeded by John H. Miller
Preceded by Edwin E. Roberts	Republican nominee for U.S. Senator from Nevada (Class 3); 1920, 1926, 1932, 1938	Succeeded by George W. Malone
Political offices
Preceded by Denver S. Dickerson	Governor of Nevada; 1911 – 1915	Succeeded by Emmet D. Boyle
U.S. Senate
Preceded by Charles B. Henderson	U.S. senator (Class 3) from Nevada; 1921 – 1933; Served alongside: Key Pittman	Succeeded by Pat McCarran
