= 1918 Nevada gubernatorial election =

- November 5, 1918
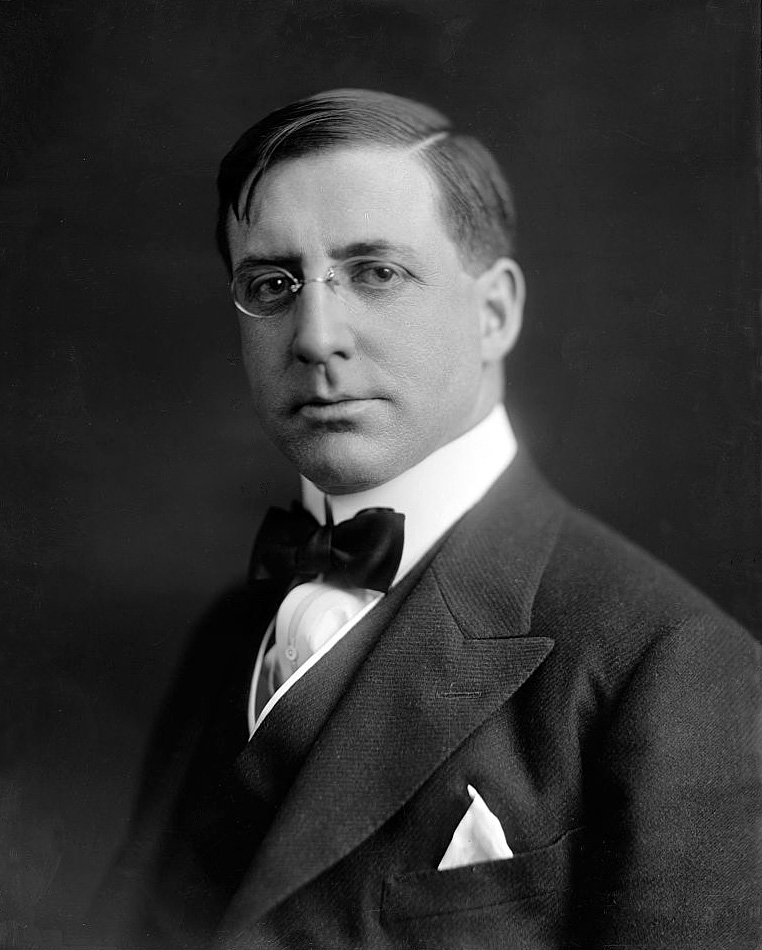

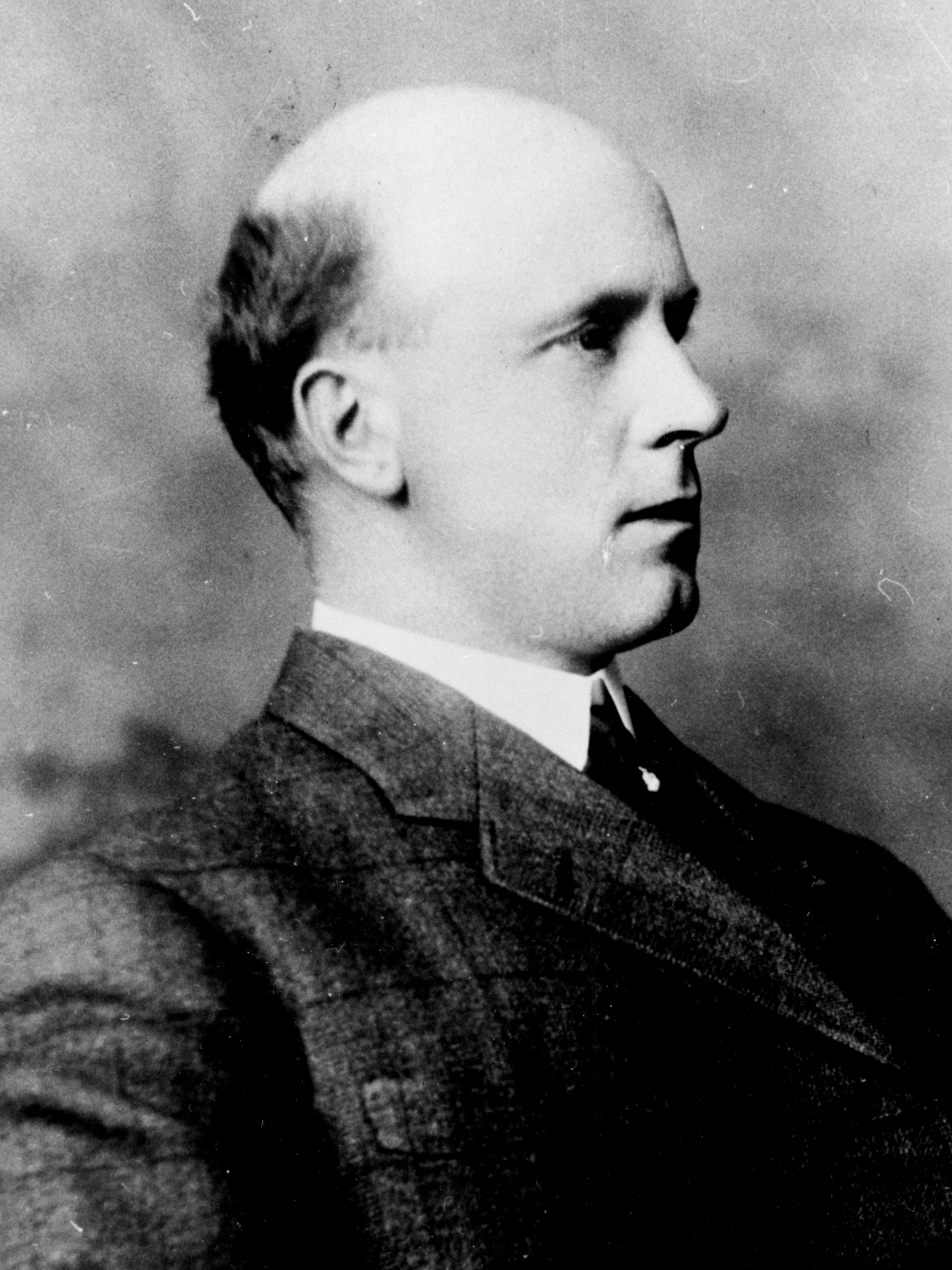
Nominee	Emmet D. Boyle	Tasker Oddie
Party	Democratic	Republican
Popular vote	12,875	11,845
Percentage	52.08%	47.92%
- County results Boyle: 50–60% 60–70% 70–80% Oddie: 50–60%
Governor before election
Emmet D. Boyle
Democratic
Elected Governor
Emmet D. Boyle
Democratic

The 1918 Nevada gubernatorial election was held on November 5, 1918. Incumbent Democrat Emmet D. Boyle defeated Republican nominee Tasker Oddie with 52.08% of the vote.

== Primary elections ==
Primary elections were held on September 3, 1918.

=== Democratic primary ===
==== Candidates ====
- Emmet D. Boyle, incumbent Governor
- George B. Thatcher, Nevada Attorney General
- Samuel M. Pickett
- Ben D. Luce

==== Results ====
Democratic primary results
Party	Candidate	Votes	%
Democratic	Emmet D. Boyle (incumbent)	4,849	47.60
Democratic	George B. Thatcher	2,452	24.07
Democratic	Samuel M. Pickett	2,284	22.42
Democratic	Ben D. Luce	603	5.92
Total votes		10,188	100.00

=== Republican primary ===
==== Candidates ====
- Tasker Oddie, former Governor
- William M. Kearney

==== Results ====
Republican primary results
Party	Candidate	Votes	%
Republican	Tasker Oddie	3,660	55.68
Republican	William M. Kearney	2,913	44.32
Total votes		6,573	100.00

== General election ==
=== Candidates ===
- Emmet D. Boyle, Democratic
- Tasker L. Oddie, Republican

=== Results ===
1918 Nevada gubernatorial election
Party	Candidate	Votes	%	±%
Democratic	Emmet D. Boyle (incumbent)	12,875	52.08%	+7.43%
Republican	Tasker Oddie	11,845	47.92%	+8.30%
Majority		1,030	4.16%	
Total votes		24,720	100.00%	
Democratic hold		Swing	-0.87%	

=== Results by county ===
County	Emmet D. Boyle Democratic		Tasker L. Oddie Republican		Margin		Total votes cast
County	#	%	#	%	#	%	Total votes cast
Churchill	581	42.78%	777	57.22%	-196	-14.43%	1,358
Clark	884	62.24%	492	35.76%	392	28.49%	1,376
Douglas	254	43.94%	324	56.06%	-70	-12.11%	578
Elko	1,226	53.72%	1,056	46.28%	170	7.45%	2,282
Esmeralda	515	47.60%	567	52.40%	-52	-4.81%	1,082
Eureka	174	44.73%	215	55.27%	-41	-10.54%	389
Humboldt	1,190	59.44%	812	40.56%	378	18.88%	2,002
Lander	413	55.74%	328	44.26%	85	11.47%	741
Lincoln	432	71.76%	170	28.24%	262	43.52%	602
Lyon	643	46.63%	736	53.37%	-93	-6.74%	1,379
Mineral	319	50.55%	312	49.45%	7	1.11%	631
Nye	1,120	51.42%	1,058	48.58%	62	2.85%	2,178
Ormsby	507	52.43%	460	47.57%	47	4.86%	967
Storey	398	60.30%	262	39.70%	136	20.61%	660
Washoe	2,615	43.96%	3,334	56.04%	-719	-12.09%	5,949
White Pine	1,604	63.00%	942	37.00%	662	26.00%	2,546
Totals	12,875	52.08%	11,845	47.92%	1,030	4.17%	24,720

==== Counties that flipped from Republican to Democratic ====
- Mineral
- Nye
- Ormsby

==== Counties that flipped from Democratic to Republican ====
- Esmeralda
- Lyon
- Washoe
