= 1914 United States Senate election in Nevada =

- November 3, 1914
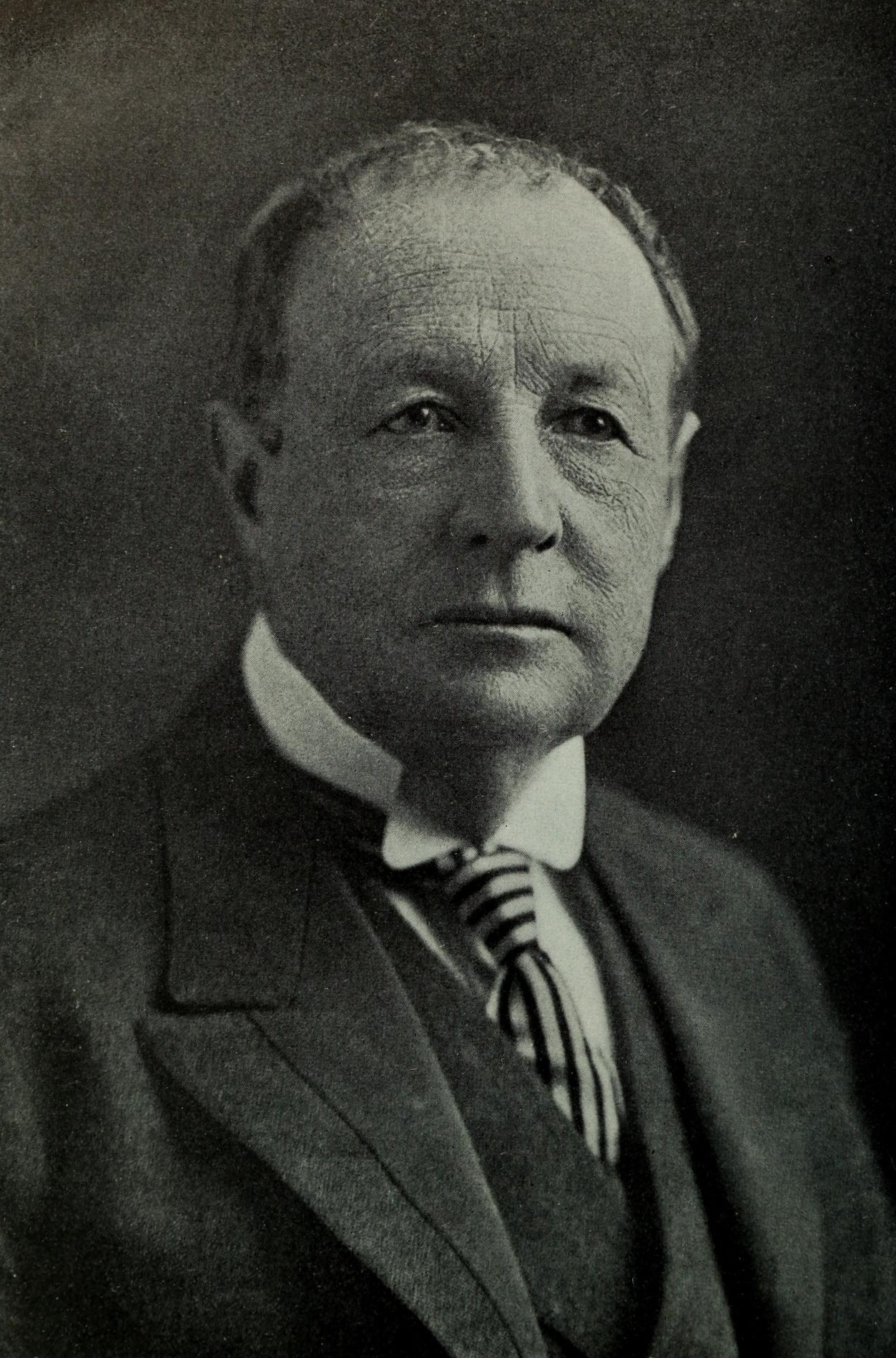

Nominee	Francis G. Newlands	Samuel Platt	Ashley Grant Miller
Party	Democratic	Republican	Socialist
Popular vote	8,078	8,038	5,451
Percentage	37.46%	37.27%	25.27%
- County results Newlands: 30–40% 40–50% 50–60% Platt: 30–40% 40–50% 50–60% Miller: 30–40% 40–50%
U.S. senator before election
Francis G. Newlands
Democratic
Elected U.S. Senator
Francis G. Newlands
Democratic

The 1914 United States Senate election in Nevada took place on November 3, 1914. Incumbent Democratic Senator Francis G. Newlands won re-election to a third term against Republican candidate Sam Platt and Socialist candidate Ashley Grant Miller. Newlands would not serve out the full term though, as he died on December 24, 1917, leading to a special election in 1918.

== Primary elections ==
Primary elections were held on September 1, 1914. However, each candidate ran unopposed for their party in this election, so there were no primary elections.

=== Democratic primary ===
==== Candidates ====
- Francis G. Newlands, incumbent U.S. Senator

=== Republican primary ===
==== Candidates ====
- Samuel Platt, former Speaker of the Nevada House of Representatives (1905-1907)

== General election ==
=== Results ===
1914 United States Senate election in Nevada
Party	Candidate	Votes	%
Democratic	Francis G. Newlands (incumbent)	8,078	37.46
Republican	Samuel Platt	8,038	37.27
Socialist	Ashley G. Miller	5,451	25.27
Majority		40	0.19
Total votes		21,567	
Democratic hold			
