= 1932 United States Senate election in Nevada =

- November 8, 1932
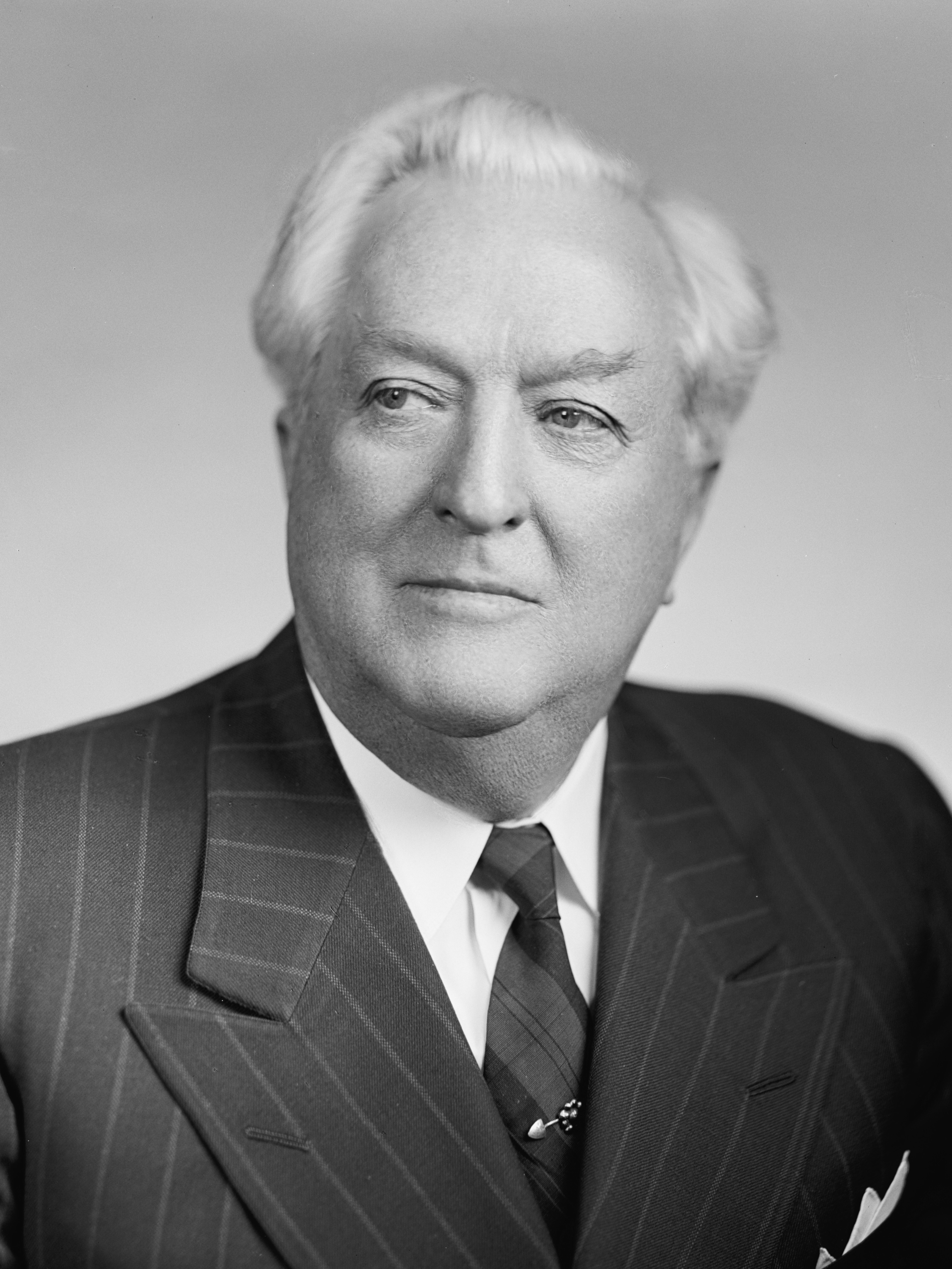

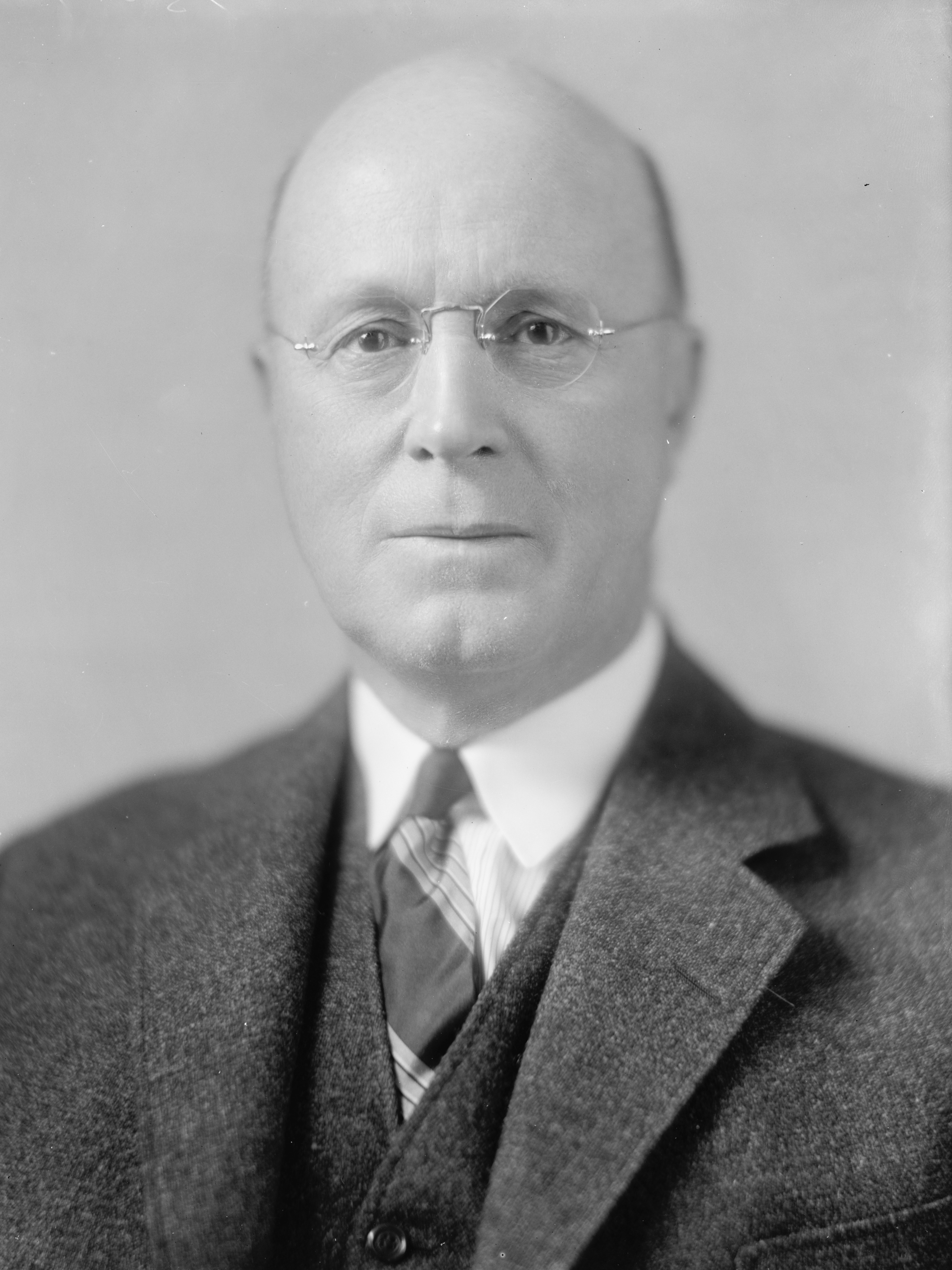
Nominee	Pat McCarran	Tasker Oddie
Party	Democratic	Republican
Popular vote	21,398	19,706
Percentage	52.06%	47.94%
- County results McCarran: 50–60% 60–70% Oddie: 50–60% 60–70%
U.S. senator before election
Tasker Oddie
Republican
Elected U.S. Senator
Pat McCarran
Democratic

The 1932 United States Senate election in Nevada took place on November 8, 1932. Incumbent Republican Senator Tasker Oddie ran for re-election to a third term, but lost to Democratic challenger Pat McCarran, due to the Republican party's unpopularity due to the Great Depression and Franklin D. Roosevelt's coattails in the concurrent presidential election.

== Primary elections ==
Primary elections were held on September 6, 1932. However, each candidate ran unopposed for their party in this election, so there were no primary elections.

=== Democratic primary ===
==== Candidates ====
- Pat McCarran, former Chief Justice of the Supreme Court of Nevada (1917-1919)

=== Republican primary ===
==== Candidates ====
- Tasker Oddie, incumbent U.S. Senator

== General election ==
=== Results ===
1932 United States Senate election in Nevada
Party	Candidate	Votes	%
Democratic	Pat McCarran	21,398	52.06
Republican	Tasker Oddie (incumbent)	19,706	47.94
Majority		1,692	4.12
Turnout		41,104	
Democratic gain from Republican			
