= 1918 United States Senate special election in Nevada =

- November 5, 1918
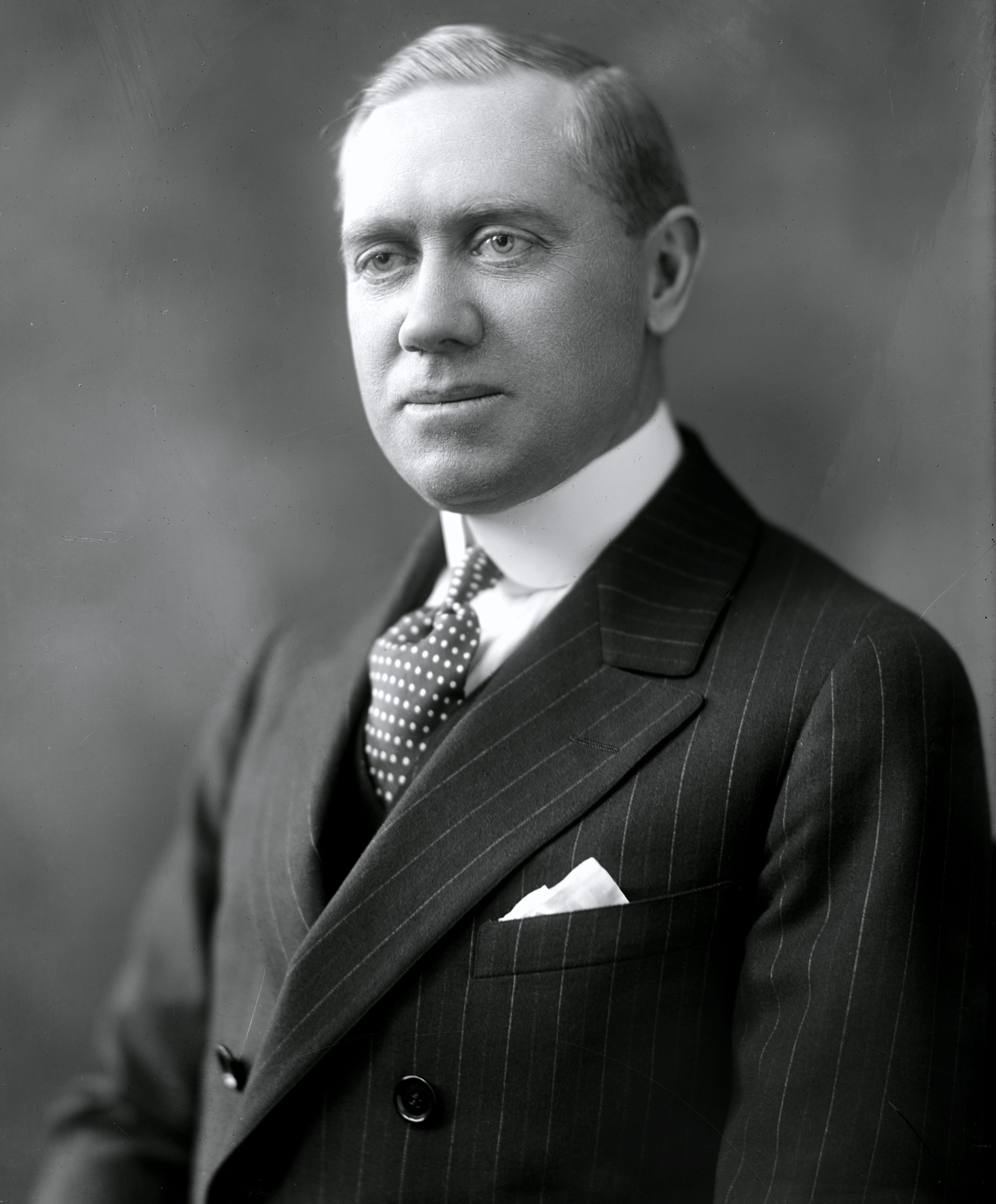

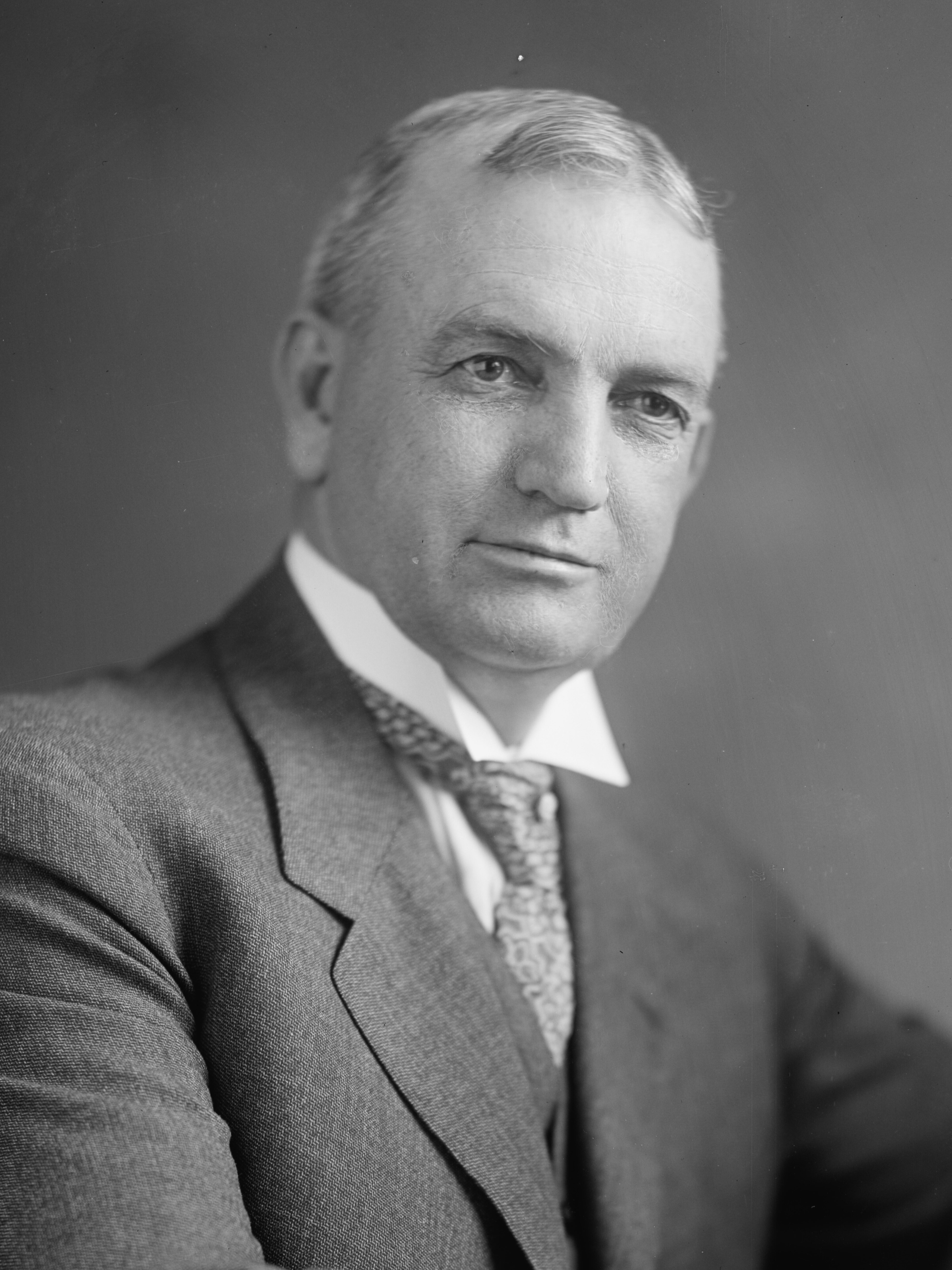

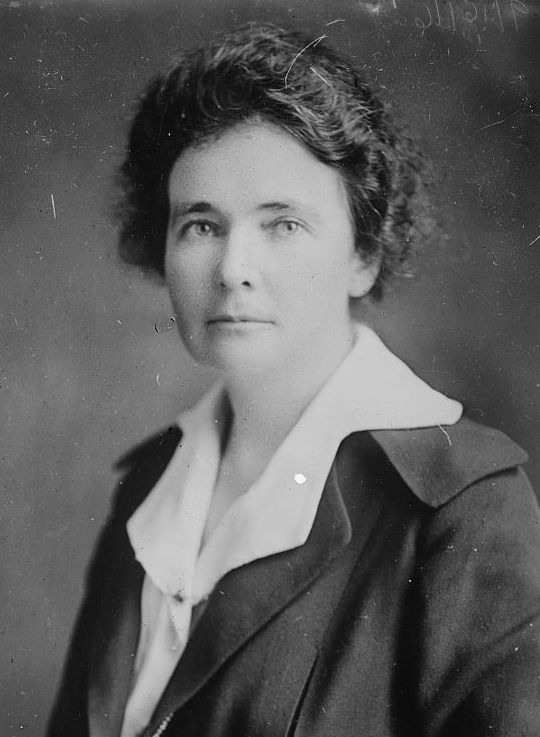
Nominee	Charles Henderson	Edwin E. Roberts	Anne Henrietta Martin
Party	Democratic	Republican	Independent
Popular vote	12,197	8,053	4,603
Percentage	47.71%	31.50%	18.01%
- County results Henderson: 30–40% 40–50% 50–60% 60–70% Roberts: 40–50% 50–60%
U.S. senator before election
Charles Henderson
Democratic
Elected U.S. Senator
Charles Henderson
Democratic

The 1918 United States Senate special election in Nevada took place on November 5, 1918. Incumbent Democratic Senator Charles Henderson, who had been appointed to the Senate by Governor Emmet D. Boyle after the death of Democratic Senator Francis G. Newlands, won a partial term, defeating Republican candidate Edwin E. Roberts and Independent candidate Anne Henrietta Martin.

== Primary elections ==
Primary elections were held on September 3, 1918.

=== Democratic primary ===
==== Candidates ====
- Charles Henderson, appointed incumbent U.S. Senator

Henderson ran unopposed for the Democratic nomination, so there was no Democratic primary.

=== Republican primary ===
==== Candidates ====
- Edwin E. Roberts, U.S. Representative from the at-large district (1911-1919)
- Walter C. Lamb

==== Results ====
Republican primary results
Party	Candidate	Votes	%
Republican	Edwin E. Roberts	4,192	65.23
Republican	Walter C. Lamb	2,234	34.77
Total votes		6,426	

== General election ==
=== Results ===
1918 United States Senate special election in Nevada
Party	Candidate	Votes	%
Democratic	Charles Henderson (incumbent)	12,197	47.71
Republican	Edwin E. Roberts	8,053	31.50
Independent	Anne Henrietta Martin	4,603	18.01
Socialist	Martin J. Scanlan	710	2.78
Majority		4,144	16.21
Turnout		25,563	
Democratic hold			
