= Emmet D. Boyle =

American politician

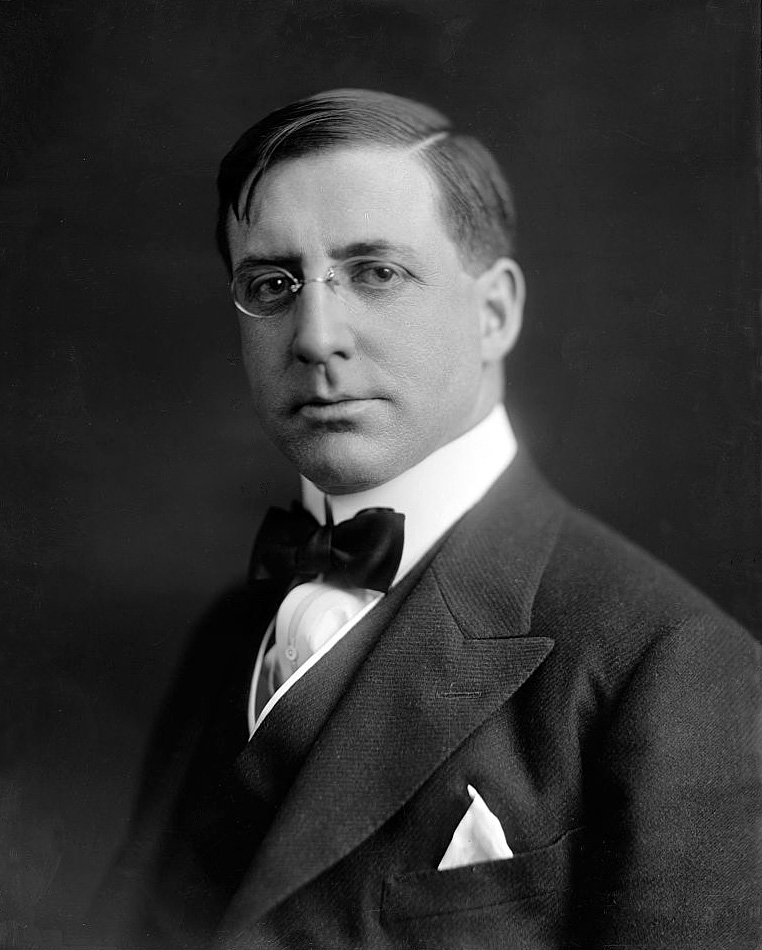

13th Governor of Nevada
- In office January 4, 1915 – January 1, 1923
- Lieutenant: Maurice J. Sullivan
- Preceded by: Tasker Oddie
- Succeeded by: James G. Scrugham

Personal details
- Born: Emmet Derby Boyle; July 26, 1879 Gold Hill, Nevada, U.S.
- Died: January 3, 1926 (aged 46) Reno, Nevada, U.S.
- Resting place: Masonic Memorial Gardens, Reno
- Party: Democratic
- Spouse: Vida Margaret McClure

Emmet Derby Boyle (July 26, 1879 – January 3, 1926) was an American politician who was the 13th governor of Nevada. He was a member of the Democratic Party.

== Biography ==
Boyle was born on July 26, 1879, in Gold Hill, Nevada, making him the first governor of Nevada to be born in the state. He was a mining engineer, and was the Governor of Nevada from 1915 to 1923. He also served as president of the Reno Chamber of Commerce.

As governor, he presided over various laws concerning working conditions and gained prominence for his opposition to boxing. In 1918, he refused to allow Fred Fulton and Jess Willard to fight in the state.

After retiring as governor, he served as publisher of the Nevada State Journal.

Boyle died on January 3, 1926, in Reno, Nevada, at the age of 46.

Party political offices
Preceded by Denver S. Dickerson	Democratic nominee for Governor of Nevada; 1914, 1918	Succeeded by James G. Scrugham
Political offices
Preceded by Tasker Oddie	Governor of Nevada; 1915 – 1923	Succeeded by James G. Scrugham
