= Women in journalism =

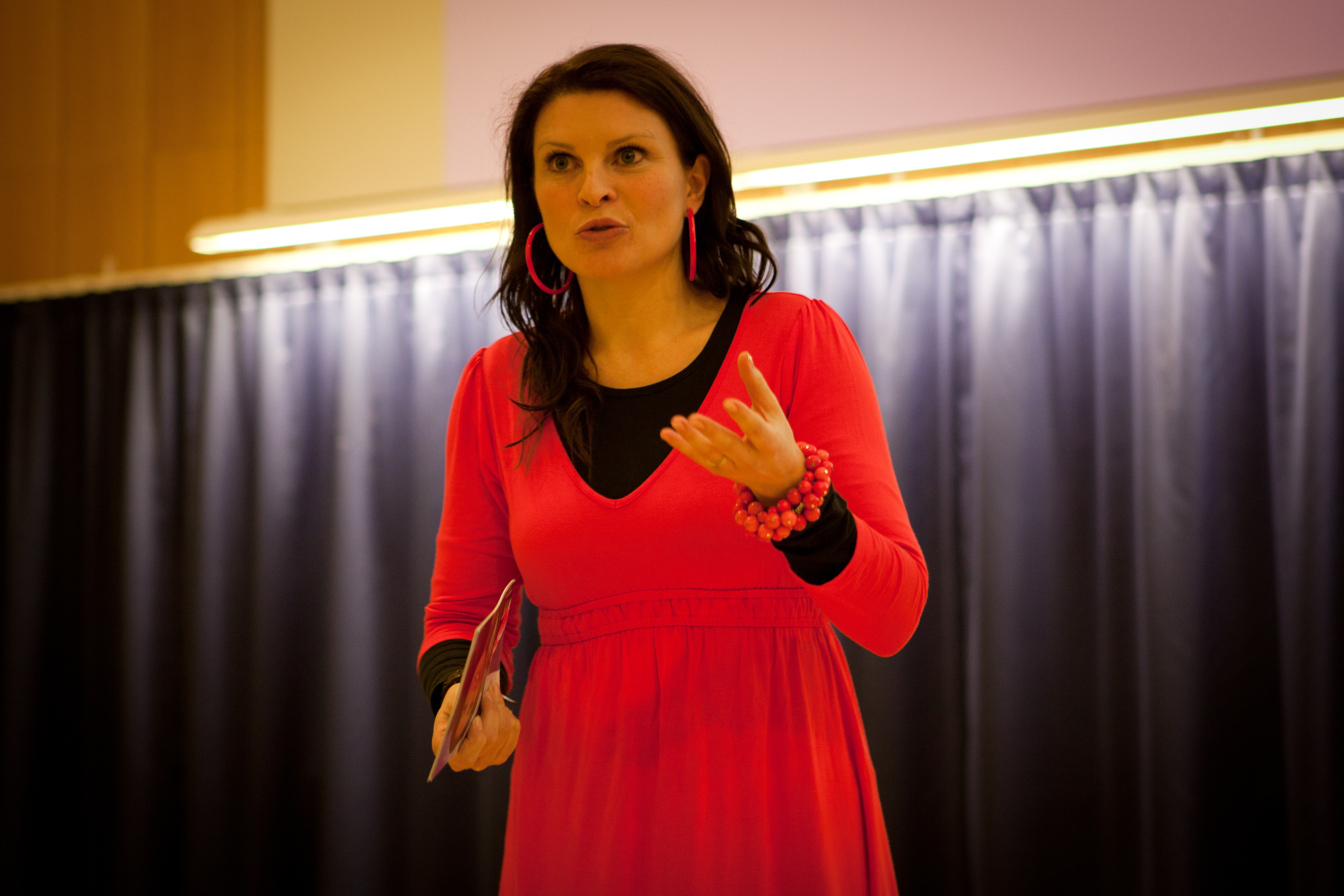
Hanne Kari Fossum, Norwegian journalist, 2011

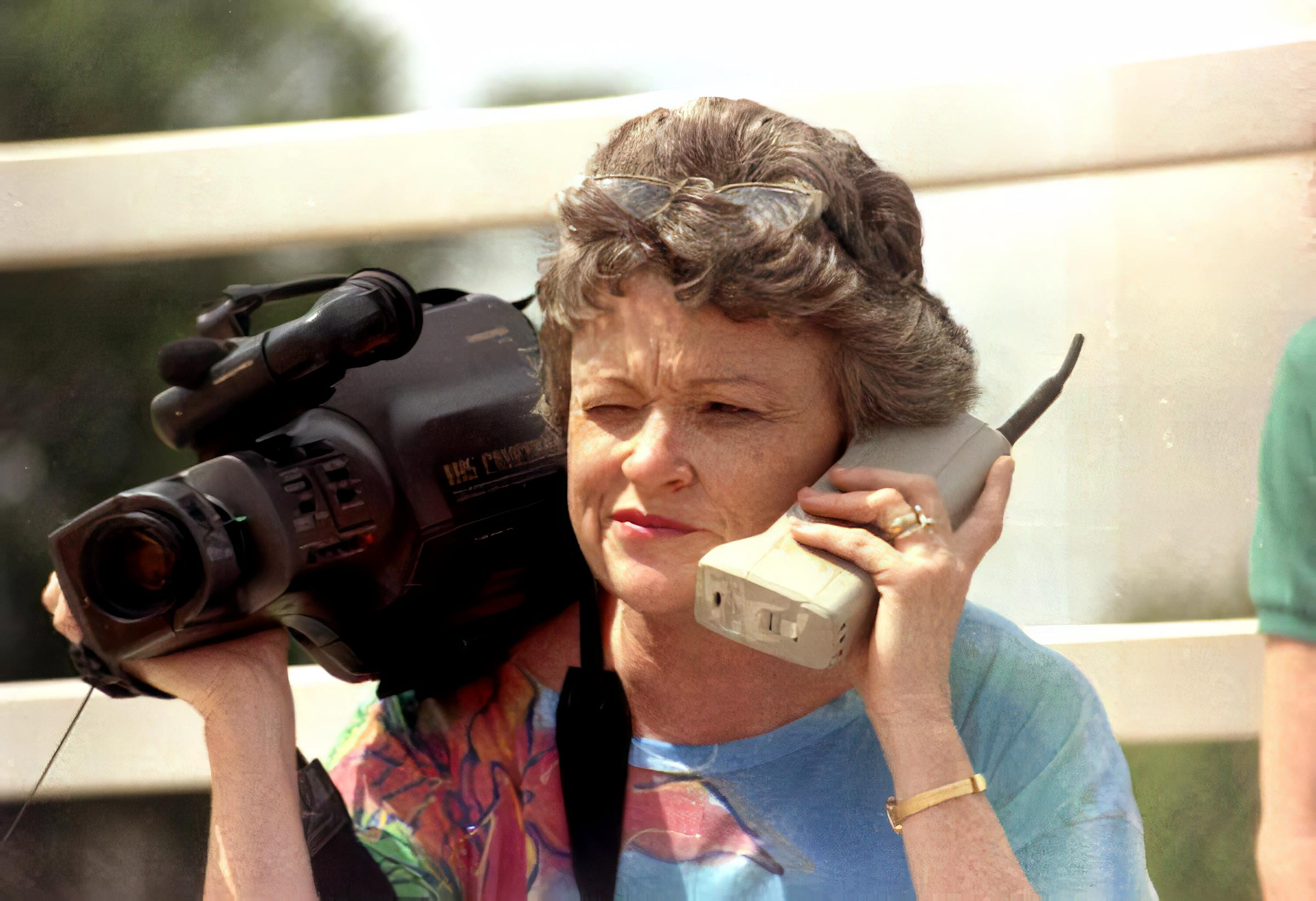
American journalist Lucy Morgan with video camera and phone, 1985

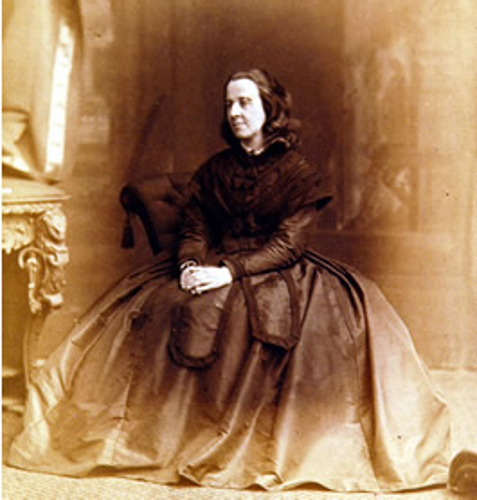
English journalist Bessie Rayner Parkes, 1865

Women having been participating in journalism since the 18th century. As journalism became a profession, women were often restricted by custom from access to journalism occupations, and faced significant discrimination within the profession. Nevertheless, women had participated in a full range of roles, including s editors, reporters, sports analysts and journalists, by the 1890s.

== Currently ==
In 2017, with the #MeToo movement, a number of notable female journalists came forward to report sexual harassment in their workplaces.

In 2018, a global support organization called The Coalition For Women In Journalism was formed to address the challenges women journalists face across different countries in the world. According to its founder, an international journalist Kiran Nazish, "Traditionally, women journalists have been doing it alone and they do need an infrastructure that helps guide them through their careers." She said in an interview, "The reason why women are not on the top is not because there aren't enough women or that they're not talented enough, it's purely that they need to help each other. That's why we were formed and that's why we would like to get as much support in from everyone in the industry."

According to Lauren Wolfe, an investigative journalist and the director of the Women's Media Center's Women Under Siege program, female journalists face particular risks over their male colleagues, and are more likely to experience online harassment or sexual assault on the job.

According to a report released on 20 December 2017 by the Committee to Protect Journalists, in 2017, 42 journalists were killed because of their work worldwide, with 81 percent of those journalists male. This was slightly lower than the historical average of 93 percent of men journalists killed annually for their work, with The Intercept theorizing that the drop was perhaps due to women being assigned more frequently to dangerous locales.

As of 2019, the problem of gender imbalance and lack of representation of women on platforms of success continued. After the British Journalism Awards 2019, the fewer bylines by women visible in the award caused a stir leading to a protest and a relaunch of Words By Women Awards.

In their Annual Report 2024, published by the Coalition For Women In Journalism, there was a 56% rise of violations against women journalists across the world.

== Safety ==
Safety of journalists is the ability for journalists and media professionals to receive, produce and share information without facing physical or moral threats. Women journalists also face increasing dangers such as sexual assault, "whether in the form of a targeted sexual violation, often in reprisal for their work; mob-related sexual violence aimed against journalists covering public events; or the sexual abuse of journalists in detention or captivity. Many of these crimes are not reported as a result of powerful cultural and professional stigmas."

The first ever press freedom and safety organization for women journalists was founded by a Pakistani journalist and advocate Kiran Nazish, called the Coalition For Women In Journalism.

=== Threats ===
Women journalists, whether they are working in an insecure context, or in a newsroom, face risks of physical assault, sexual harassment, sexual assault, rape, and even murder. Women journalists are vulnerable to attacks not only from those attempting to silence their coverage but also from sources, colleagues, and others. A 2014 global survey of nearly 1,000 journalists, initiated by the International News Safety Institute (INSI) in partnership with the International Women's Media Foundation (IWMF) and with the support of UNESCO, found that nearly two-thirds of women who took part in the survey had experienced intimidation, threats or abuse in the workplace.

In the period from 2012 through 2016, UNESCO's Director-General denounced the killing of 38 women journalists, representing 7 per cent of all journalists killed. The percentage of journalists killed who are women is significantly lower than their overall representation in the media workforce. This large gender gap is likely partly the result of the persistent under-representation of women reporting from war zones or insurgencies or on topics such as politics and crime.

The September 2017 report of the United Nations Secretary-General outlines a way forward for a gender-sensitive approach to strengthening the safety of women journalists. In 2016, the Council of Europe’s Committee of Ministers adopted recommendation CM/Rec(2016)4 on the protection of journalism and the safety of journalists and other media actors, in particular noting the gender-specific threats that many journalists face and calling for urgent, resolute and systematic responses. The same year, the IPDC council requests the UNESCO Director-General's report to include gender information.

Legal harassment is the biggest threat to female journalists, according to a report by the Coalition for Women in Journalism. So far this year, at least 72 cases of legal harassment have been reported to the CFWIJ. When the number of detentions is added, it becomes clear how the legal system can be misused to target and silence journalists, posing a serious threat to female journalists.

Another big issue is harassment, which can happen online and at work. The sexual nature of the harassment women experience is often rooted in misogyny, as evidenced by the numerous cases of rape threats and sexually explicit manipulated photos and videos that have been used to defame and disparage female journalists. The so-called "double onslaught" on female journalists is visible again: they are targeted both for their gender and their profession. For this reason, it is crucial to focus on the gendered components of the dangers to which female journalists are exposed. The harassment women journalists face, whether online or offline, threatens their right to freedom of expression and limits the diversity of opinion in the media.

=== Online harassment ===
Research by Pew Research Center indicated that 73 per cent of adult internet users in the United States had seen someone be harassed in some way online and 40 per cent had personally experienced harassment, with young women being particularly vulnerable to sexual harassment and stalking.

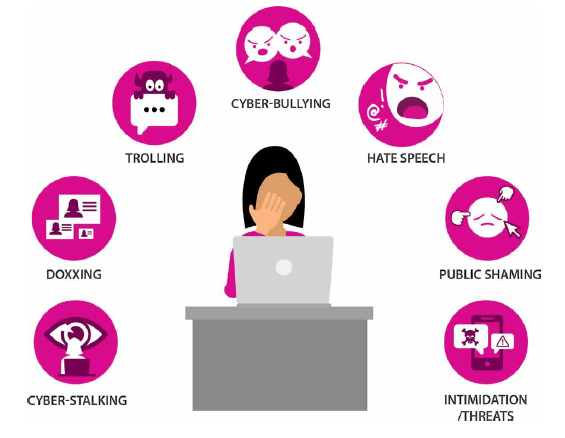
Online harassment of women journalists, World Trends Report 2018

An analysis of more than two million Tweets performed by the think tank Demos found that women journalists experienced approximately three times as many abusive comments as their male counterparts on Twitter.

The Guardian surveyed the 70 million comments recorded on its website between 1999 and 2016 (only 22,000 of which were recorded before 2006). Of these comments, approximately 1.4 million (approximately two per cent) were blocked for abusive or disruptive behavior. Of the 10 staff journalists who received the highest levels of abuse and ‘dismissive trolling’, eight were women.

The INSI and IWMF survey found that more than 25 per cent of ‘verbal, written and/or physical intimidation including threats to family and friends’ took place online.

Countering online abuse is a significant challenge, and few legislative and policy frameworks exist on the international or national level to protect journalists from digital harassment.

The International Federation of Journalists and the South Asia Media Solidarity Network launched the Byte Back campaign to raise awareness and combat online harassment of women journalists in the Asia-Pacific region.

The Organization for Security and Cooperation in Europe (OSCE) organized an expert meeting titled ‘New Challenges to Freedom of Expression: Countering Online Abuse of Female Journalists’ which produced a publication of the same title that includes the voices of journalists and academics on the realities of online abuse of women journalists and how it can be combated.

== By country ==
=== Canada ===
Sophia Dalton published the newspaper The Patriot in Toronto in 1840–1848, followed in 1851 by Mary Herbert, who became the first woman publisher in Nova Scotia when publishing the Mayflower, or Ladies' Acadian Newspaper.

Three Canadian woman journalists who worked near the end of the nineteenth century for newspapers which would evolve into the Globe and Mail were Kit Coleman, Faith Fenton and Sara Jeannette Duncan.

Canadian-born Florence MacLeod Harper was notable for her work with photographer Donald Thompson covering both the Eastern front in World War One and the February revolution in St Petersburg 1917 for Leslie's Weekly. Her subsequent books, Bloodstained Russia and Runaway Russia, were among the first Western accounts of events.

=== The Netherlands ===
Henriette Holst-Hendrix, the first woman journalist in Holland, was known both in the U.S. and abroad for her lectures on Dutch and Japanese customs. Soon after completing college, Holst at the age of 21 entered the newspaper field in 1898, at a time when journalism was still considered "a man's job." Working first for De Telegraaf, she became an art, literary and dramatic critic for the chief Amsterdam papers, coming into close contact with most of the artists of her own country and many foreign artists traveling through Holland.

In 1907, she married Willem Holst, an expert in Oriental art, and went to live in Japan. During her seventeen years there, she contributed articles to newspapers in Amsterdam; Surabaya, Java; London; and New York. Many of her reviews appeared in The New York Times and The Saturday Review of Literature. While in Japan, she published "Study of the life of Japanese Women" in Dutch. Mrs. Holst began to lecture in Yokohama, Japan, when the Alliance française asked her to relate her interviews with the actress Sarah Bernhardt.

In 1923, the Great Kantō Earthquake struck and destroyed everything. Only themselves surviving, they came back to Holland where her children continued to study, and the following year moved to New York. Henriette spoke several times at the Great Neck Town Hall under the auspices of different societies – the League for Political Education and the Netherland-America Foundation among them. After one of her lectures the Netherlands Legation appointed her to represent Holland at a world conference in Washington, D.C.

Mrs. Holst was managed by William B. Feakins Inc. located at Times Building, New York. She was president of the New York branch of the Netherlands Abroad Society. She appeared before many women's clubs and gave talks at schools, clubs and summer camps. In Great Neck she was active in the Great Neck Players. She died of cancer on August 22, 1933, at age 56.

=== Denmark ===
In Denmark, women became editors early on by inheriting papers form their spouses, the earliest examples being Sophie Morsing, who inherited Wochenliche Zeitung from her husband in 1658 and managed the paper as editor, and Catherine Hake, who inherited the paper Europäische Wochentliche Zeitung as widow the following year – as far as it is known, though, these women did not write in their papers.

The first woman in Denmark to publish articles in Danish papers was the writer Charlotte Baden, who occasionally participated in the weekly MorgenPost from 1786 to 1793. In 1845, Marie Arnesen became the first woman to participate in the public political debate in a Danish newspaper, and from the 1850s, it became common for women to participate in public debate or contribute with an occasional article: among them being Caroline Testman, who wrote travel articles, and Athalia Schwartz, who was a well known public media figure through her participation in the debate in the papers between 1849 and 1871. In the 1870s, the women's movement started and published papers of their own, with women editors and journalists.

It was not until the 1880s, however, that women begun to be professionally active in the Danish press, and Sofie Horten (1848–1927) likely became the first woman who supported herself as a professional journalist when she was employed at Sorø Amtstidende in 1888. An important pioneer was Loulou Lassen, employed at the Politiken in 1910, the first female career journalist and a pioneer female journalist within science, also arguably the first nationally well known woman in the profession. In 1912, eight women were members of the reporter's union Københavns Journalistforbund (Copenhagen Association of Journalists), five in the club Journalistforeningen i København (Journalist Association of Copenhagen) and a total of 35 women employed as journalists in Denmark. In this early half of 20th century, Ellen Hørup emerged as one of the first female foreign policy journalists in Denmark. From the late 1920s, she wrote extensively on Gandhi and Indian liberation.

=== Egypt ===
Hind Nawfal (1860–1920) was the first woman in the Arab world to publish a journal (Al-Fatat) concerning only women's issues. Zaynab Fawwaz was another prolific journalist who also founded a literary salon.

=== Finland ===
The Swedish journalist and editor Catharina Ahlgren was most likely the first female journalist and editor in the then Swedish province of Finland when she published her own essay paper, the Swedish language Om att rätt behaga in 1782, which was also among the first papers in Finland.

Traditionally, the first female journalist has been referred to as Fredrika Runeberg, who wrote poems and articles in Helsingfors Morgonblad under the name of her spouse Johan Ludvig Runeberg in the 1830s. The first woman in Finland to work as a journalist in Finland under her own name was Adelaïde Ehrnrooth, who wrote in Helsingfors Dagblad and Hufvudstadsbladet for 35 years from 1869 onward.

=== France ===
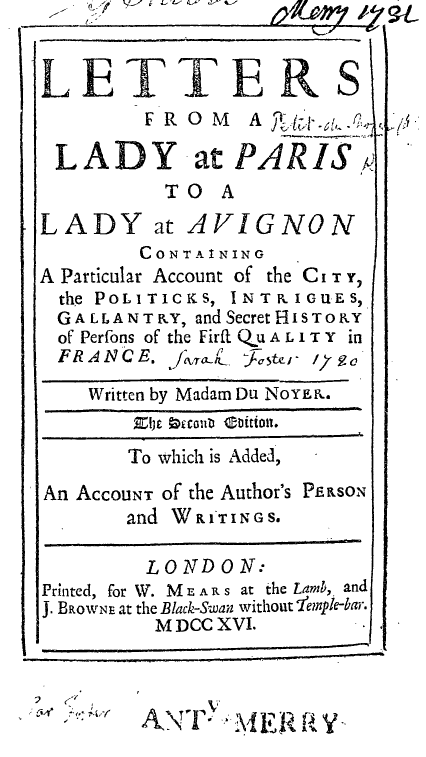
Du Noyer, Madame (Anne Marguerite Petit). Letters from a lady at Paris to a lady at Avignon containing a particular account of the city, the politicks, intrigues, gallantry, and secret history of persons of the first quality in France. The second edition. ... Vol. 1. London, 1716.

Women's involvement in journalism came early in France. Women having been active within the printing and publishing business since Yolande Bonhomme and Charlotte Guillard in the early 16th century, the first female journalists appeared almost from the beginning when the press and the profession of journalism developed in the 17th and early 18th century. Anne-Marguerite Petit du Noyer (1663–1719) has been referred to as the perhaps first female celebrity journalists in France and Europe. Her reports of the negotiations leading to the Peace of Utrecht were read all over Europe, and admired for the distinction with which she reported on scandal and gossip.

During the 18th century, women were active as publishers, chief editors and journalists in the French press. Female authors such as Jeanne-Marie Leprince de Beaumont and Adélaïde Dufrénoy contributed with articles to the press, and chief editors such as Madeleine Fauconnier of the Nécrologe of Paris (1764–1782) and Justine Giroud of the Affiches, annonces et avis-divers du Dauphiné of Grenoble 1774–1792, enjoyed successful careers in both the capital and the provinces.

The feminist press developed, and Madame de Beaumer, Catherine Michelle de Maisonneuve and Marie-Emilie Maryon de Montanclos all successively functioned as chief editors and directors of the women's magazine Journal des dames (1759–78). During the French Revolution, women editors such as Marguerite Pagès-Marinier, Barbe-Therese Marchand, Louise-Félicité de Kéralio and Anne Félicité Colombe participated in the political debate.

During the 19th century, it was not uncommon for women to participate in the French press, but the majority of them were not professional journalists but writers such as George Sand, who only contributed on a temporary basis. In the second half of the 19th century, the women's movement started their own magazines with female journalists, though they were seldom professional full-time reporters.

During the 1880s and 1890s, about a dozen women journalists were employed in the French press. They were considered the pioneer generation of professional women reporters in France, among whom Caroline Rémy de Guebhard (1855–1929) and Marguerite Durand (1864–1936) are often referred to as the pioneers. Caroline Rémy de Guebhard, pen-name Severine, was employed by the Cri du Peuple in 1880s and has been referred to as the first female reporter in France.

=== Germany ===
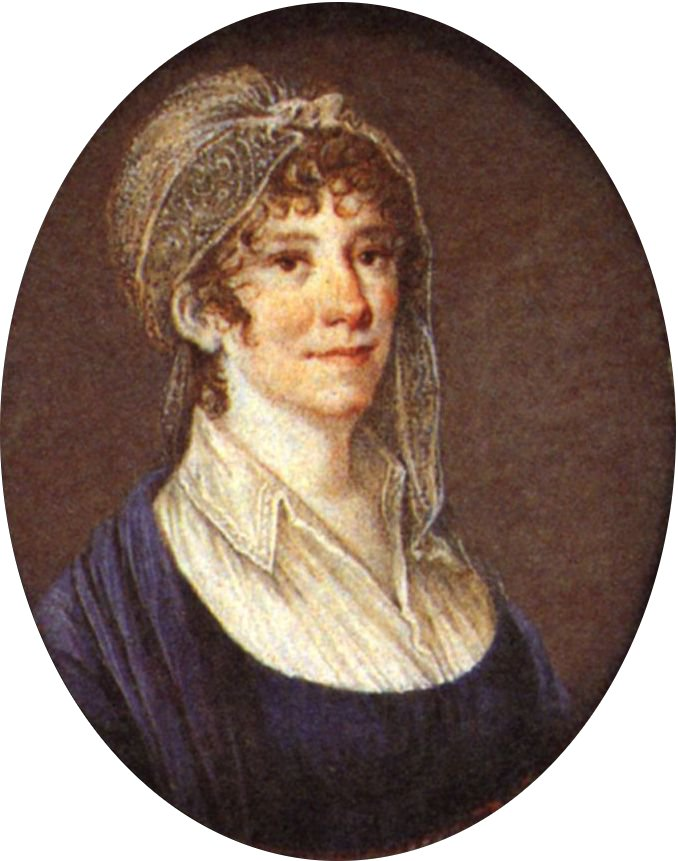
Therese Huber

In 1816, Therese Huber became an editor of the Morgenblatt für gebildete Stände, one of the main literary and cultural journals of the era. Therese Huber was the first woman supporting her family with a salaried editorial position at a journal and has been described as the first woman to hold an editorial position and even as the first journalist in Germany. Huber had full responsibility for the journal from 1817 to 1823. She was not only author and editor for the journal, but also contributed many of her own translations. The journal had its most successful period under her editorship, with more than 1800 copies sold in 1820.

=== Kenya ===
Kagure Gacheche, The editor of "Hustle", a pullout in the Wednesday edition of The Standard, a national newspaper in Kenya.

Christine Koech, The editor of "Eve", a pullout in the Saturday edition of The Standard, a national newspaper in Kenya.

Judith Mwobobia, The editor of "Sunday", a pullout in the Sunday edition of The Standard, a national newspaper in Kenya.

=== Nepal ===
The history of women in journalism in Nepal is relatively new. Nepal only enjoyed an open press after the 1990 democratic movement. It is only since that change that women have been more active in the scene of journalism. The number of registered women journalists under the Federation of Nepalese Journalists is 1,613.

=== Norway ===
The first female journalist in Norway was Birgithe Kühle, who published the local paper Provincial-Lecture in Bergen between 1794 and 1795.

During the 19th century, women participated with articles in the press, especially within the culture sections and a translators, notably Magdalene Thoresen, who has by some been referred to as an early female journalist: from 1856, Marie Colban (1814–1884) lived in Paris, from where she wrote articles for Morgenbladet and Illustreret Nyhedsblad, for which she can be regarded as the first female foreign correspondent in the Norwegian press.

Other pioneers were Wilhelmine Gulowsen, editor of the culture paper Figaro in 1882–83, and Elisabeth Schøyen, editor of the family magazine Familie-Musæum in 1878 and journalist of Bergensposten and Aftenposten.

The Norwegian newspaper press in the capital of Oslo had their first two female reporters with Marie Mathisen at Dagsposten in 1897, and Anna Hvoslef at Aftenposten in 1898: the former became the first female member of the Oslo Journalistklubb (Oslo Journalist Association) in 1902.

=== Poland ===
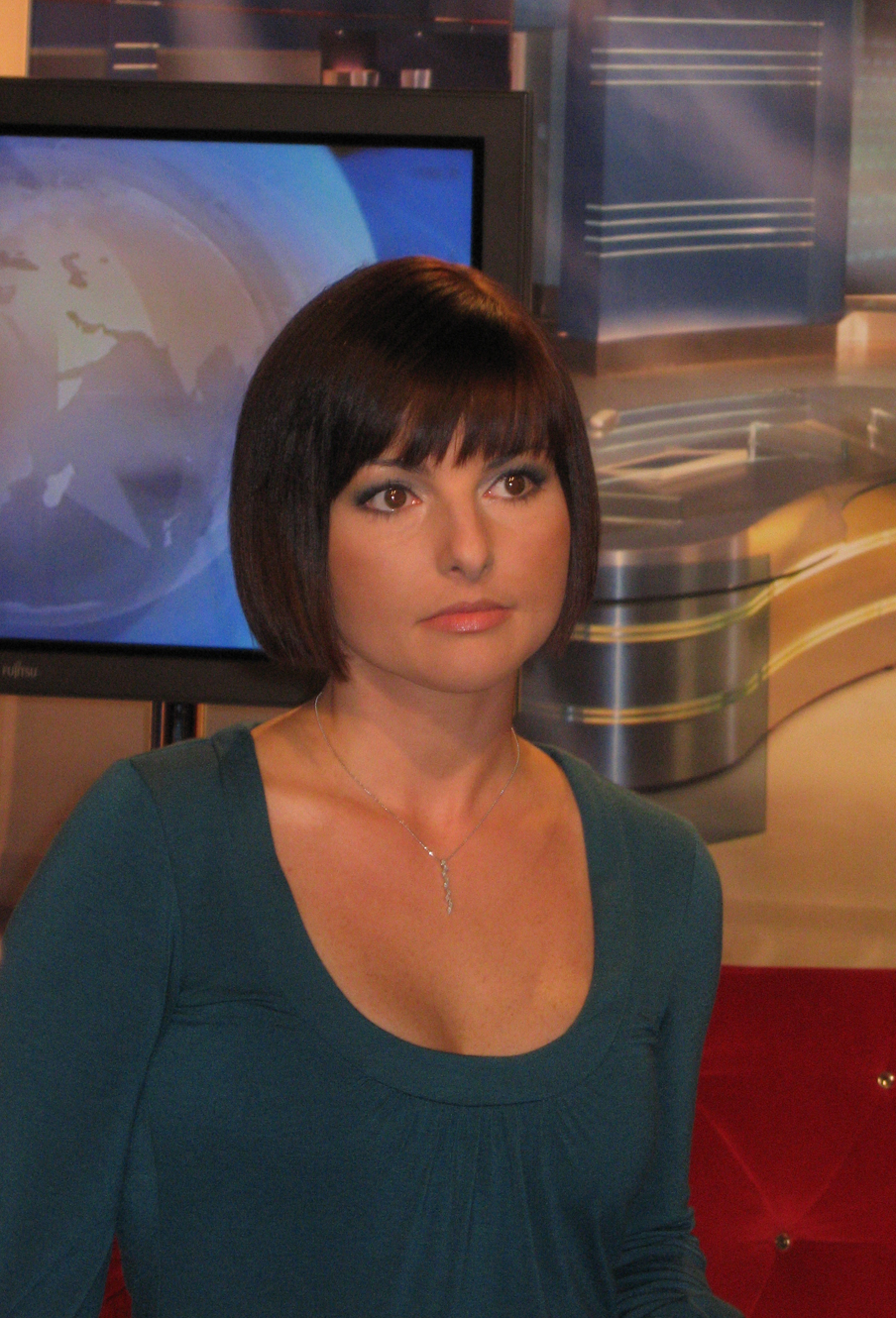
Polish television news anchor Beata Chmielowska-Olech, 2007

In 1822, Wanda Malecka (1800–1860) became the first woman newspaper publisher in Poland when she published the Bronisława (followed in 1826–1831 by the Wybór romansów); she had in 1818-1820 previously been the editor of the handwritten publication Domownik, and was also a pioneer woman journalist, publishing articles in Wanda.

=== Sweden ===
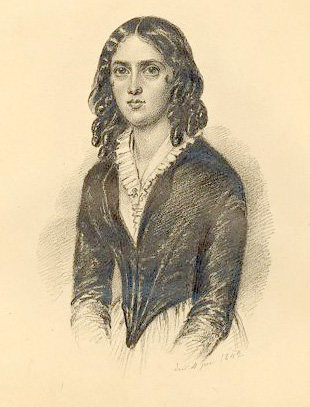
Wendela Hebbe, drawing by Maria Röhl 1842.

In Sweden, Maria Matras, known as "N. Wankijfs Enka", published the paper Ordinarie Stockholmiske Posttijdender in 1690–1695, but it is unknown if she wrote in the paper as well.

Margareta Momma became the first identified female journalist and chief editor as the editor of the political essaypaper Samtal emellan Argi Skugga och en obekant Fruentimbers Skugga in 1738. During the 18th century, many periodicals for, about, and likely also by women were published, but as women normally published under pseudonym, the can seldom be identified: one of the few identified ones being Catharina Ahlgren, who edited the typical women's periodical De nymodiga fruntimren (Modern Women) in 1773. Women chief editors became fairly common during the 18th century, when the press in Sweden developed, especially since the widow of a male printer or editor normally took over the business of her late spouse: a successful and well known female newspaper editor was Anna Hammar-Rosén, who managed the popular newspaper Hwad Nytt?? Hwad Nytt?? between 1773 and 1795.

It was not until the 19th century that the papers of the Swedish press started to introduce a permanent staff of co-workers and journalists, a development which attached the first women as permanent employees to the newspaper offices, which are noted to be Wendela Hebbe at Aftonbladet in 1841–1851 and Marie Sophie Schwartz at Svenska Tidningen Dagligt Allehanda in 1851–1857. In 1858, Louise Flodin came to be regarded as an important pioneer when she founded her own newspaper, became the first woman to be given a newspaper license, and composed a staff entirely of women employees, and Eva Brag became an important pioneer during her career at Göteborgs Handels- och Sjöfartstidning in 1865–1889.

From the 1880s, women became more common in the offices of the press, and when women was admitted to the Swedish Publicists' Association in 1885, 14 women were inducted as members. The pioneer generation of women journalists were generally from the upper/middle class who wished to earn their own income. At this point, the focus of a conventional education for a woman was language, which was not the case with a conventional male education, especially since the male reporters were generally not from the upper classes. Women were employed as translators and given the responsibility for the coverage of culture and foreign news and interviews of foreigners. During this period, women journalists were reportedly respected – partially due to their social background – and due to their language skills given assignments with equal status to their male co-workers. In 1918, Maria Cederschiöld, first woman editor of a foreign news section, recalled that women reporters were not as controversial or discriminated in the 1880s as they would later become, "...when the results of Strindberg's hatred of women made itself known. Nor was the struggle of life and competition so sharp, as it has later become. The women pioneers were generally treated with sympathy and interest, even by the men, perhaps because they normally did not regard them as dangerous competitors."

Of the seven biggest newspapers in Stockholm, six had female co-workers prior to 1900, and when Swedish Union of Journalists was founded in 1901, women were included from the start. An important event occurred in 1910, when the popular novel Pennskaftet by Elin Wägner made the journalist's profession a popular career choice for women, and women career journalists were often referred to as "pennskaft". By this time, women reporters, though a minority, had become common and no longer regarded as a novelty, and the competition had become harder: in 1913, Stockholms Dagblad made a record by having seven female co-workers, and the same year, the Swedish Publicists' Association founded the De kvinnliga journalisternas stipendiefond to finance foreign trips for women reporters. Women covered World War I and the Russian Revolution and several women journalists became famed role models, including Ester Blenda Nordström, Anna Lisa Andersson and Elin Brandell.

During the Interwar period, a change occurred that exposed women reporters to an informal discrimination long referred to as a "woman's trap": the introduction of the customary women's section of the newspapers. During World War I, war-time rationing made it necessary to cover household interests, which after the war became a woman's section, as household tasks were regarded as female tasks. The coverage of the women's section customarily became the task of the female reporters, and as they were a minority, the same reporters were often forced to handle the women's section aside from their other assignments, which placed them at a great disadvantage to their male colleagues when the competition became harsher during the interwar depression. In parallel, there were women with successful careers, notably Barbro Alving, whose coverage of the Spanish Civil War, World War II and the Cold war made her famous, and Dagmar Cronn, who was the editor of the economy section at Svenska Dagbladet in 1933–1959, which made her unique at the time. In 1939, Elsa Nyblom became vice chairperson of the Publicistklubben.

The informal discrimination changed when women reporters started to expand the subjects treated at the women's sections. A noted example of this development was Synnöve Bellander, editor of the women's section "Hus och hem" at Svenska Dagbladet in 1932–1959. Originally expected to write only of fashion and make up, Bellander started to expand the area to the subjects of education and professional life for women, and from there to consumer issues and food quality and other issues concerning the private home life. This development in the women's sections gradually transformed them to sections for "family" and private life for both sexes, and blurred the line to the rest of the paper.

The 1960s signified a great change. A debate about gender discrimination in the press, followed by the general debate about gender roles during the second-wave feminism, quickly raised the numbers of female reporters in the press from 1965 onward. In 1970, Pernilla Tunberger became the first woman to be awarded Stora Journalistpriset.

=== Turkey ===
Fatma Aliye Topuz wrote for 13 years, between 1895 and 1908, columns in the magazine Hanımlara Mahsus Gazete ("Ladies' Own Gazette"), and her sister Emine Semiye Onasya worked on the editorial staff.

=== United Kingdom ===
The number of women contributing to British newspapers and periodicals increased dramatically as the 19th century progressed. This increase was partly due to the proliferation of women-only publications that covered society, arts and fashion as well as emerging topics such as feminism and women's suffrage. The trend was also accompanied by a slow-growing acceptance of women journalists in the more traditional press. By 1894, the number of women journalists was large enough for the Society of Women Writers and Journalists to be founded, By 1896, the society had over 200 members.

The first female full-time employed journalist in Fleet Street was Eliza Lynn Linton, who was employed by The Morning Chronicle from 1848: three years later, she became the paper's correspondent in Paris, and upon her return to London in the 1860s, she was given a permanent position.

Early in her career, novelist George Eliot was a contributor to the Coventry Herald and Observer, and she later became assistant editor on the left-wing journal The Westminster Review from 1851 until 1852.

Feminist writer Bessie Rayner Parkes Belloc began her career writing for local newspapers and was founder editor of the English Woman's Journal, which was published between 1858 and 1864, she also wrote essays, poetry, fiction and travel literature. Her daughter, Marie Belloc Lowndes, was a novelist as well as a contributor to The Pall Mall Gazette between 1889 and 1895. She travelled widely for her work and reported on the Paris Exhibition of 1889. Marie's brother was writer and satirist Hilaire Belloc.

The Irish writer Frances Cobbe wrote for the London Echo from 1868 until 1875, with most of her work appearing in the newspaper's leaders. She wrote on a range of topics, the agreement being that she visited the newspaper offices three mornings a week to write an article "on some social subject".

One of the first British war correspondents was the writer Lady Florence Dixie who reported on the First Boer War, 1880–1881, as field correspondent for The Morning Post. She also reported on the Anglo-Zulu War.

Emily Crawford was an Irish foreign correspondent who lived in Paris and wrote a regular "Letter from Paris" for London's Morning Star in the 1860s. Her husband, George Moreland Crawford, was the Paris correspondent of The Daily News. When he died suddenly in 1885, Emily inherited his position and continued in the role until 1907. She wrote for a wide range of newspapers and periodicals during her career and became President of the Society of Women Journalists in 1901.

After studying medicine at Edinburgh, Florence Fenwick Miller decided to follow a different course and turned to lecturing and writing instead. She was a keen proponent of women's suffrage and edited The Woman's Signal from 1895 until 1899. In 1886 she began a Ladies' Column for The Illustrated London News and continued it for 30 years. She contributed to a wide range of other publications during her career, including The Echo, Fraser's Magazine and The Woman's World.

Flora Shaw was a foreign correspondent whose interview with the exiled former Sudanese governor, Zebehr Pasha, was published in the Pall Mall Gazette in 1886. This led to commissions from the Manchester Guardian and The Times where Shaw eventually became Colonial Editor. As a correspondent, she travelled to Southern Africa, Australia, New Zealand and Canada.

After a famous failed attempt to divorce her husband, Lord Colin Campbell, in 1886, Irish born Gertrude Elizabeth Blood turned to journalism. She contributed to the Pall Mall Gazette and wrote columns on a wide range of topics, including art, music, theatre and fishing.

Virginia Mary Crawford began writing for The Pall Mall Gazette in the 1880s after a much publicised divorce from her husband Donald Crawford. Her writing covered art, literature, women's rights and Catholicism. She played an active role in women's suffrage.

Eliza Davis Aria was a fashion writer and columnist known as 'Mrs Aria', who wrote for a variety of publications in the late 19th and early 20th centuries, including for Queen, The Gentlewoman, Hearth and Home, and the Daily Chronicle. She was well known in London society and had a long-term relationship with the actor Sir Henry Irving.

In 1891, Rachel Beer became the first female editor of a national newspaper in the UK when she became editor of The Observer. In 1893 she purchased the Sunday Times and became editor of that paper too.

One of the founders of the Society of Women Journalists, Mary Frances Billington, was its president from 1913 to 1920. Her career began in the 1880s and she helped establish the Southern Echo in 1888. She covered major events for the Daily Telegraph in the late 1890s and later reported from France during World War I.

=== United States ===
External videos
- Women Journalists at the Turn of the 20th Century, Professor Tracy Lucht, lecture at Iowa state University, C-SPAN

The Baroness Frederika Charlotte Riedesel's 18th-century Letters and Journals Relating to the War of the American Revolution and the Capture of the German Troops at Saratoga is regarded as the first account of war by a woman. Her writing analyzes the relevant events, personalities of key actors and consequences of the military struggles she observed. Moreover, she was personally involved in the heart of the Battles of Saratoga. She suffered the hardships of siege when she sheltered in the cellar of the Marshall House during the failed retreat of the British army.

Beginning in the late 19th century, women began agitating for the right to work as professional journalists in North America and Europe; by many accounts, the first notable woman in political journalism was Jane Grey Swisshelm. A former correspondent for Horace Greeley's New York Tribune, she persuaded President Millard Fillmore to open the gallery in congress so that she could report on congressional news. Prior to Swisshelm, Horace Greeley had employed another noteworthy woman in journalism, Margaret Fuller, who covered international news. Nellie Bly became known for her investigative reporting at the New York World. She was one of the first female journalists of her era to report by going undercover.

While many female reporters in the 1800s and early 1900s were restricted to society reporting and were expected to cover the latest in food or fashion, there were a few women who reported on subjects that were considered the domain of male reporters. One example was Ina Eloise Young (later Ina Young Kelley). In 1907, Young was said to be the only female sports editor (or "sporting" editor, as it was then called). She worked in Colorado for the Trinidad Chronicle-News, and her areas of expertise were baseball, football, and horse racing. She covered the 1908 World Series, the only woman of her time to do so. The 2014 Status of Women in the U.S. Media reported that of more than 150 sports-related print publications and sports-related websites, 90 percent of editors were white males.

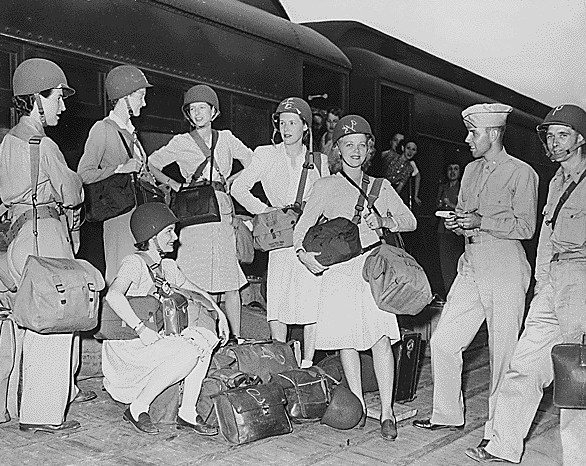
U.S. World War II correspondents

Another example of a woman in a non-traditional media profession was Jennie Irene Mix: when radio broadcasting became a national obsession in the early 1920s, she was one of the few female radio editors at a magazine: a former classical pianist and a syndicated music critic who wrote about opera and classical music in the early 1920s, Mix became the radio editor at Radio Broadcast magazine, a position she held from early 1924 until her sudden death in April 1925. In talk radio, there were no women among the top 10 of Talkers Magazine's "Heavy Hundred" and only two women were among the 183 sport talk radio hosts list. Women increased their presence in professional journalism, and popular representations of the "intrepid girl reporter" became popular in 20th-century films and literature, such as in His Girl Friday (1940).

Dorothy Thompson was an American journalist and radio broadcaster, who in 1939 was recognized by Time magazine as the second most influential woman in America, after Eleanor Roosevelt. Thompson is notable as the first American journalist to be expelled from Nazi Germany in 1934 and as one of the few women news commentators on radio during the 1930s. She is regarded by some as the "First Lady of American Journalism". After the War, she stood up for Palestinian rights against much hostility.

== Notable women ==
See also Women journalists by name and by category and Women printers and publishers before 1800 References for this section can be found on the article pages if not cited below.

Early journalists

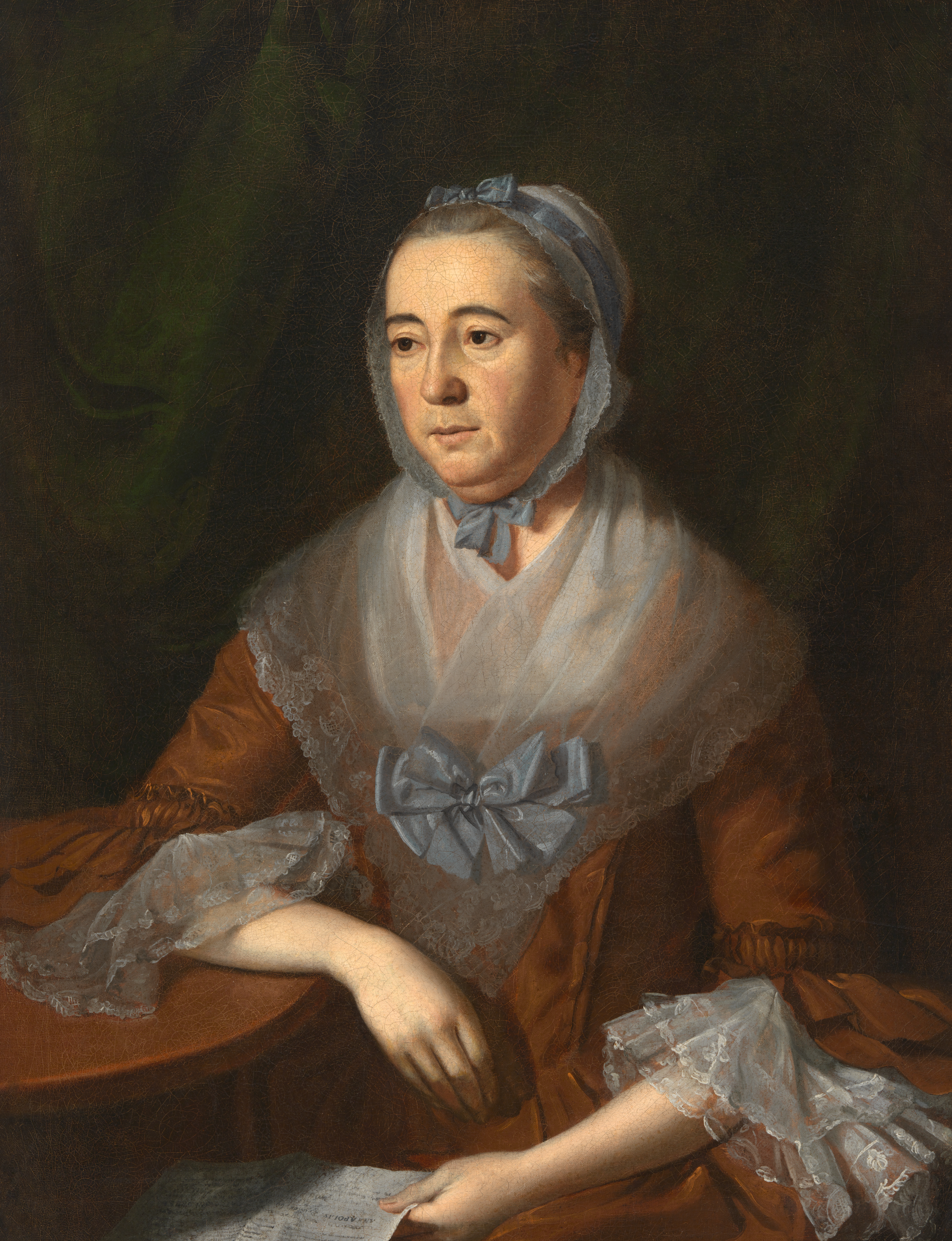
Green, c. 1720

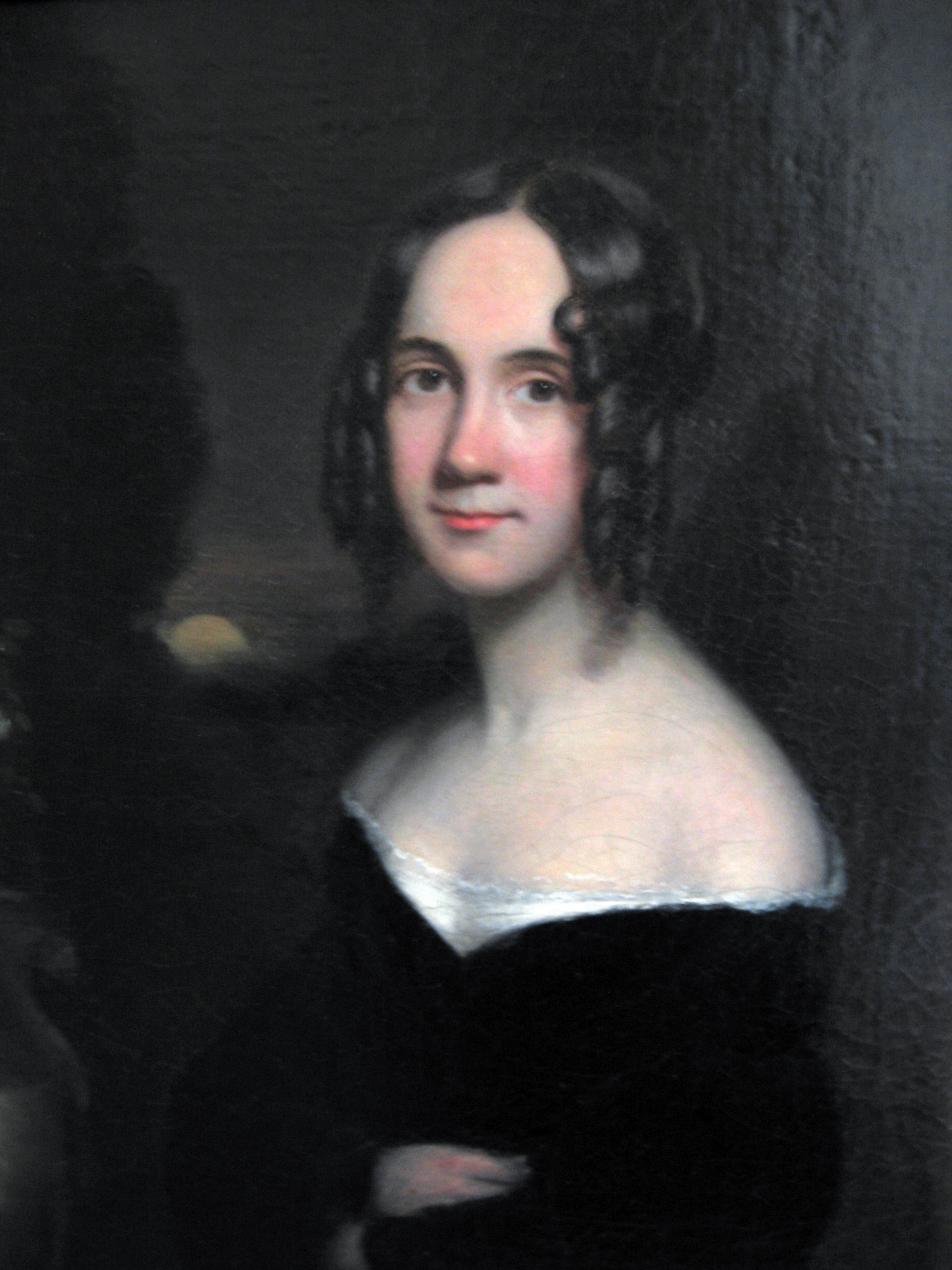
Hale, 1788

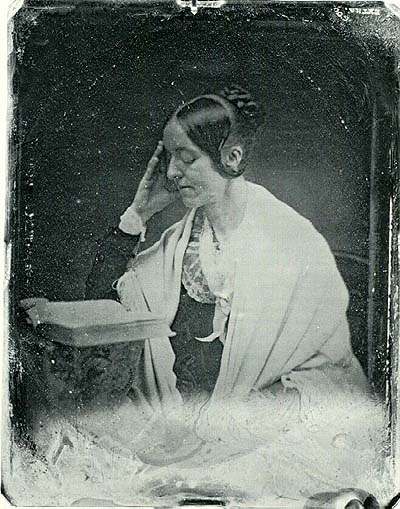
Fuller, 1810

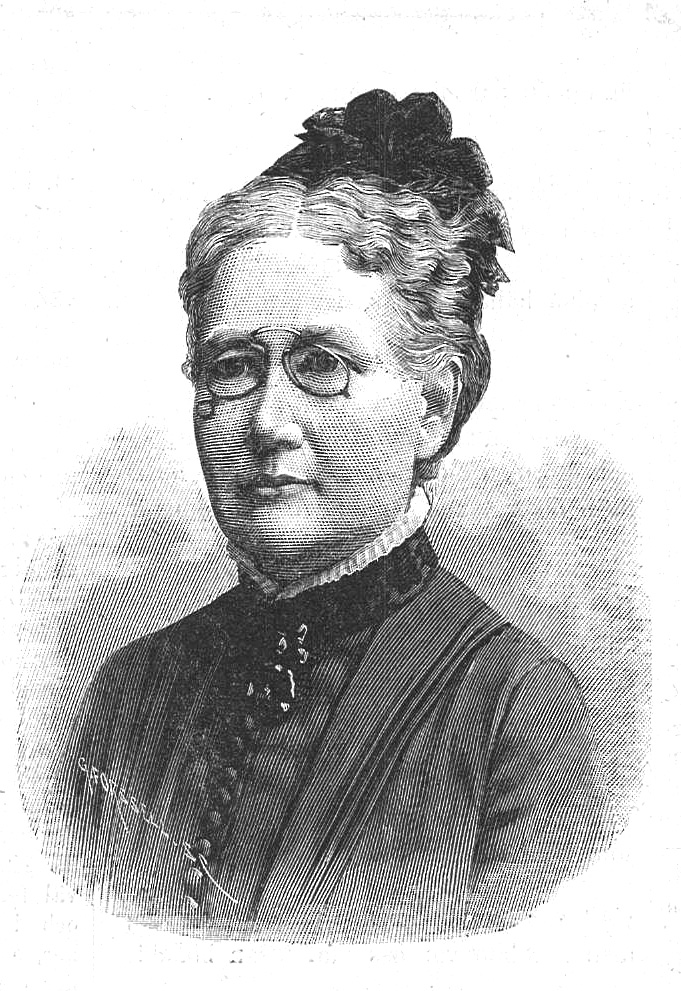
Flodin, 1828

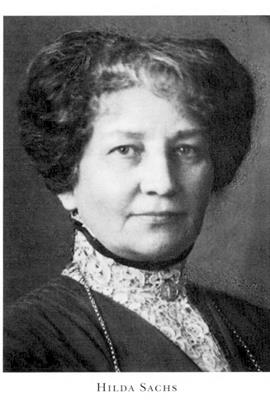
Sachs, 1857

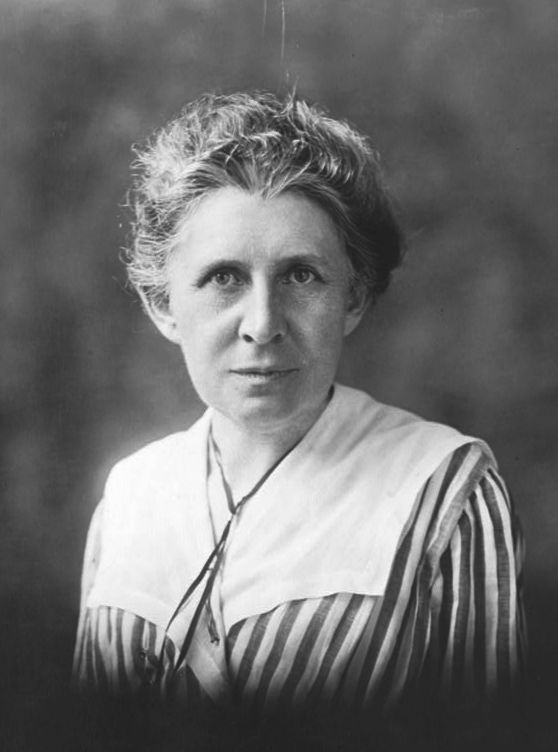
Tarbell, 1857

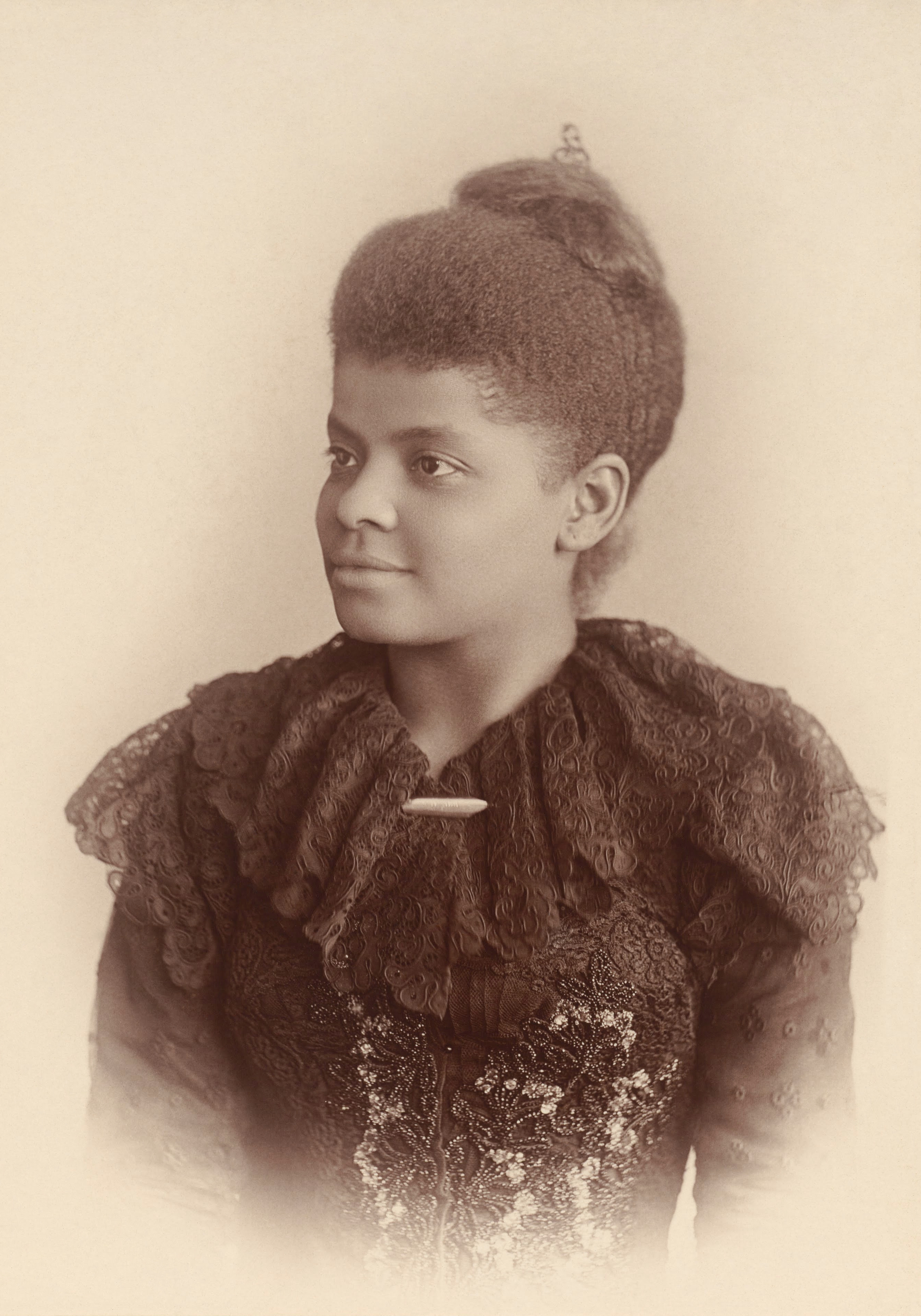
Wells, 1862

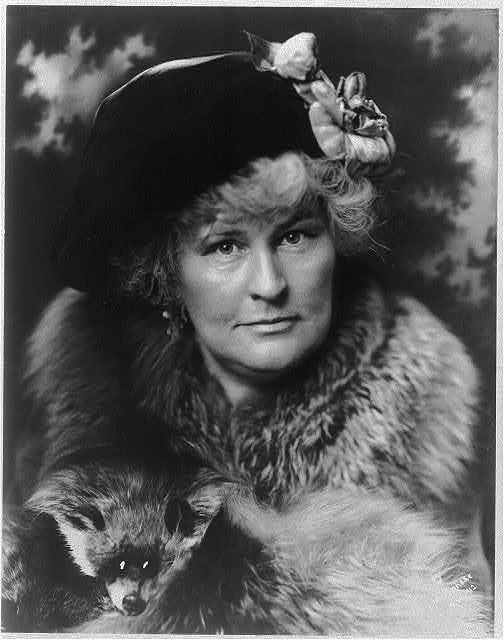
Bonfils, 1863

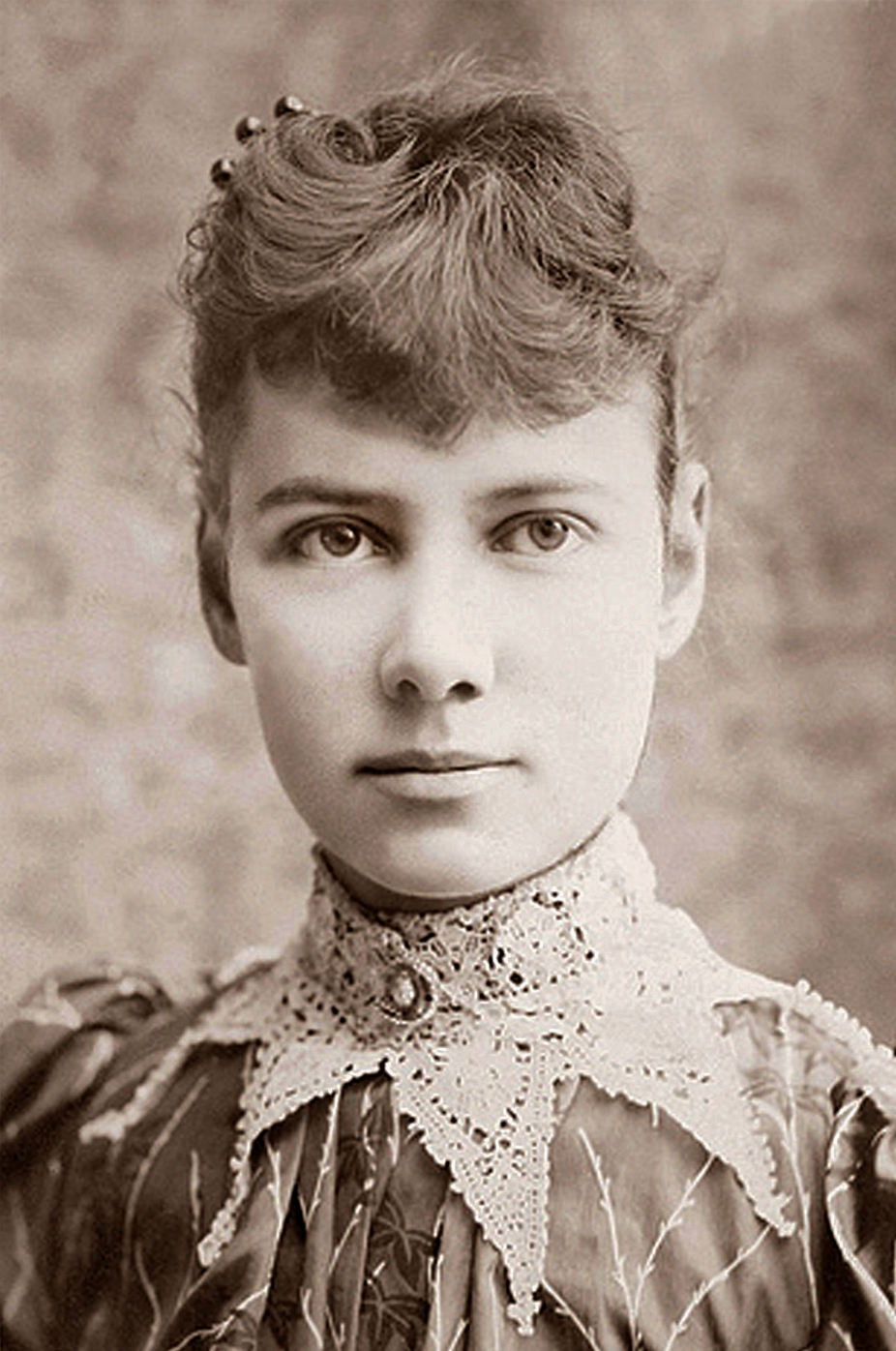
Bly, 1867

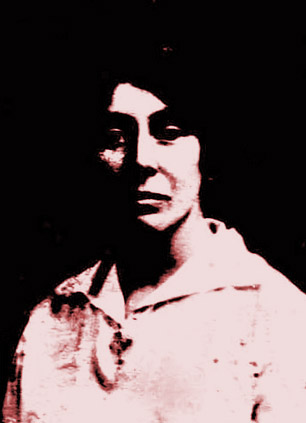
Vorse, 1874

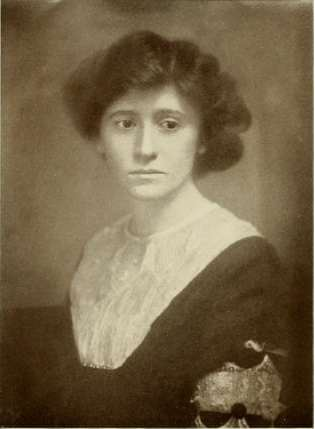
Martyn, 1878

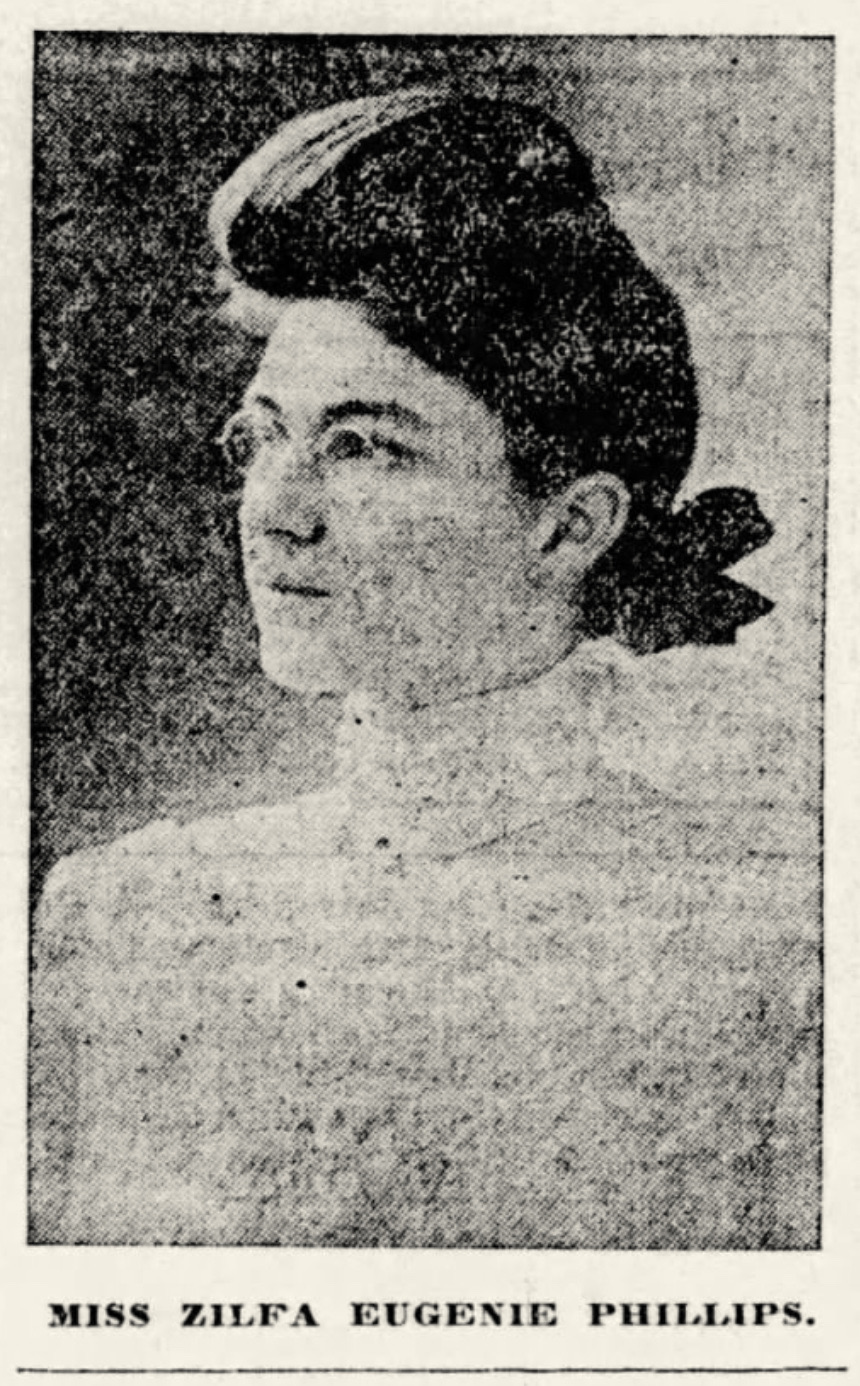
Estcourt, 1883

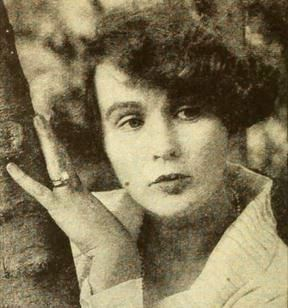
St. Johns, 1894

With birth year

=== A–K ===
- Donna Abu-Nasr (Lebanon), senior reporter at Bloomberg, currently Saudi bureau chief, responsible also for Bahrain and Yemen.
- Lydia Adams-Williams (1867–1928), American writer and conservationist
- Aida Alami (Morocco), freelance journalist reporting from North Africa, France, the Caribbean, and Senegal; regular contributor to The New York Times, Foreign Policy, Financial Times, and Bloomberg.
- Hannah Allam (1977), American reporter covering extremism, domestic terrorism and national security for the Washington Post.
- Jane Arraf, New York Times Baghdad bureau chief. She has covered Iraq since 1991 and opened CNN's first bureau there in 1998.
- Lina Attalah (born 1983), an Egyptian journalist, co-founder and editor of Mada Masr, an independent Egyptian online newspaper, founded in June 2013.
- Nada Bakri (Lebanon), former reporter for The New York Times, Bakri was based at their Baghdad bureau. Bakri spent more than a decade reporting from the Middle East.
- Nellie Bly (1867–1922), an American journalist who led an exposé in which she faked insanity to study a mental institution from within.
- Bolormaa Luntan (d. 2015), a Mongolian journalist who reported on corruption of politicians, mining and corporates.
- Winifred Bonfils (1863–1936), an American San Francisco Examiner reporter and First World War columnist
- Joan Juliet Buck (born 1948), first and only American woman to be editor in chief of a French magazine
- Marion Carpenter, first female National Press Photographer to cover the White House.
- Maria Cederschiöld (1856–1935), the first woman journalist in Sweden to be chief editor of a newspaper's foreign department.
- Olena Chekan (1946–2013), did political interviews
- Frona Eunice Wait Colburn (1859–1946), one of only two female journalists in San Francisco in 1887, associate editor of the Overland Monthly
- Marie Colvin (1956–2012), war reporter, lost eye covering Sri Lanka civil war in 2001, killed by Syrian government while covering the 2012 siege of Homs in Syria.
- Katie Couric (born 1957), first female anchor to host her own weekday network evening news broadcast
- Evelyn Cunningham (1916–2011), Civil Rights Movement journalist at The Pittsburgh Courier
- Charlotte Curtis (1928–1987) (USA), named Op-Ed editor in 1974, becoming the first woman on the masthead at The New York Times.
- Mabel Craft Deering (1873–1953), first woman to edit a national Sunday magazine
- Nancy Dickerson (1927–1997) (USA), a pioneering American radio, television journalist, and producer of documentaries.
- Shamael Elnoor (Sudan), human rights activist and freelance journalist working with independent newspapers Al-Tayyar and Al-Shorooq. In 2017 Elnoor came under attack from hard-line Islamists in Sudan for writing a column that criticized government health policies.
- Gloria Emerson (1929–2004) (USA), reported from Vietnam for The New York Times.
- Zaina Erhaim (Syria), award-winning journalist and feminist reporting on the Syrian civil war from within Syria. She is a communications manager with the Institute for War and Peace Reporting (IWPR) and has trained more than 100 media activists on journalism basics in Syria.
- Zilfa Estcourt (1883-1959), American newspaper columnist and editor, described as "the dean of west coast woman writers"
- Rose Eveleth (USA), award-winning science journalist and podcaster
- Kay Fanning (1927-2000) (USA), editor of the Christian Science Monitor, first woman to edit an American national newspaper, president of the American Society of News Editors
- Louise Flodin (1828–1923) (Sweden), one of the first women in Publicistklubben (the Swedish Publicists' Association) then it was opened to females in 1885
- Pauline Frederick, UN correspondent for NBC; also was a newspaper and radio reporter
- Dorothy Fuldheim (1893–1989) (USA), first woman in the US to anchor a television show, Often called the "First Lady of Television News".
- Margaret Fuller (1810–1850) (USA), first full-time book reviewer in journalism and first female foreign correspondent
- Mary Garber (1916–2008), award-winning sportswriter and pioneering female journalist
- Martha Gellhorn (1908–1998), an American novelist, travel writer, and journalist, who is now considered one of the greatest war correspondents of the 20th century. The Martha Gellhorn Prize for Journalism is named after her.
- Asmaa al-Ghoul (1982, Palestine), the first Palestinian recipient of the Courage in Journalism award, al-Ghoul writes for the Ramallah-based newspaper Al-Ayyam, and is "known for her defiant stance against violations of civil rights in Gaza."
- Barbara Gluck (born 1938), an American photojournalist, art photographer, speaker, and writer who covered the Vietnam War.
- Mary Katherine Goddard (1738–1816), an early American publisher, postmaster of the Baltimore Post Office, and the first to print the U.S. Declaration of Independence.
- Amy Goodman (born 1957), first journalist to receive the Right Livelihood Award in 2008. The prize was awarded in the Swedish Parliament on 8 December 2008.
- Katharine Graham (1917–2001), publisher of The Washington Post through the Watergate era and the publication of the Pentagon Papers
- Marguerite Higgins Hall (1920–1966), an American reporter and war correspondent who covered World War II, the Korean War and the war in Vietnam.
- Miki Haimovich (born 1962), Israeli television presenter
- Amira Hass (born 1956), columnist and reporter for Ha'aretz
- Anne Catherine Hoof Green (1720–1775), 18th-century newspaper publisher in Maryland
- Sarah Josepha Hale (1788–1879), an American writer, editor, and the author of the nursery rhyme "Mary Had a Little Lamb".
- Lorena Hickok (1893–1968), AP reporter from 1928 to 1933, and intimate friend of Eleanor Roosevelt
- Clare Hollingworth, OBE (1911–2017), first war correspondent to report the outbreak of World War II
- Lynn Johnston (born 1947), first woman to win the Reuben Award (in 1985) as the top newspaper cartoonist in the U.S.
- Dorothy Kilgallen (1913-1965), American investigative journalist and columnist (Author of the Voice of Broadway). Reported Queen Elizabeth 2's coronation and investigated the Assassination of John F Kennedy. Wrote for the New York Journal-American

=== L–Z ===
- Yonit Levi (born 1977), Israeli television presenter and journalist.
- Flora Lewis (1922–2002), American correspondent and columnist in foreign affairs for numerous publications, including The Washington Post and The New York Times. Lewis won the Overseas Press Club award for best interpretation of foreign affairs for her reporting on communism 1956 Poland.
- Malvina Lindsay (1893–1972), columnist and women's page editor at The Washington Post
- Lara Logan (born 1971), chief foreign affairs correspondent for CBS News.
- Saadia Sehar Haidari (born 1971), first Pakistani female video and photojournalist for Associated Press of Pakistan and Geo News
- Rachel Maddow (born 1973), host of MSNBC's The Rachel Maddow Show, first openly gay anchor of a prime-time American news show in the United States
- Anita Martini (1939–1993), sports journalist and broadcaster, first female journalist at a Major League Baseball All-Star Game (1973) and first to be allowed into a Major League Baseball locker room for a post-game press conference (1974)
- Marguerite Martyn (1878–1948), St. Louis Post-Dispatch artist and reporter, 1905–1941.
- Nancy Hicks Maynard (1946–2008), first African-American female reporter at The New York Times, and co-owner and co-publisher of The Oakland Tribune, and co-founder of the Maynard Institute for Journalism Education.
- Marie Mattingly Meloney (1878–1943), described in 1943 by The New York Times as "one of the leading woman journalists of the United States."
- Anne Morrissy Merick (1933–2017), trailblazing Vietnam War journalist and TV producer.
- Marya McLaughlin (1929–1998), CBS TV's first female on air reporter. Marya McLaughlin was one of the "pioneering women reporters who broke the gender line in broadcast news."
- Sia Michel (born 1967), the first woman to edit a large-circulation American rock magazine and currently editor of the Culture section of The New York Times
- Anja Niedringhaus (1965–2014), first female photojournalist to win Pulitzer Prize for Breaking News Photography for coverage of the Iraq War.
- Reena Ninan (1999–Present), Indian American woman journalist who owns Good Trouble Productions.
- Ethel L. Payne (1911–1991) (the "first lady of the black press"; affiliated with the Chicago Defender; known for coverage of the Civil Rights Movement, and as the first African-American commentator to join a national television network)
- Anna Politkovskaya (1958–2006), Russian journalist noted for her coverage of Russia's involvement in Chechnya and assassination.
- Cora Rigby (1865–1930), American journalist, the first woman at a major paper to head a Washington News bureau and one of the founders of the Women's National Press Club.
- Amanda Ripley, American journalist and author
- Robin Roberts (born 1960), African-American anchor for ABC's Good Morning America. Roberts was an ESPN reporter and anchor from 1990 to 2005. She was the first journalist to interview President Barack Obama after his inauguration.
- Eleanor Roosevelt (1884-1962), longest serving first lady of the U.S., author of the syndicated newspaper column My Day
- Hilda Sachs (1857–1935), Swedish journalist who became the first of her sex to be a delegate at the international journalist conference in Rome in 1899.
- Diane Sawyer (born 1945), first female correspondent on CBS' 60 Minutes. Sawyer is well known for reporting documentaries and investigative journalism. She is the anchor of ABC's evening newscast World News. Sawyer previously co-anchored ABC's Good Morning America.
- Venice Tipton Spraggs (1905–1956), American, the first Black to be elected to Theta Sigma Phi
- Adela Rogers St. Johns (1894–1988), American journalist, Presidential Medal of Freedom recipient, known as "The World's Greatest Girl Reporter" during the 1920s and 1930s, and the inspiration for Hildy Johnson in the film His Girl Friday
- Susan Stamberg (1938–2025), an American radio journalist who is a Special Correspondent for National Public Radio; beginning in 1972 Stamberg served as co-host of All Things Considered, becoming the first woman to hold a full-time position as anchor of a national nightly news broadcast in the United States.
- Gloria Steinem (born 1934), American media spokeswoman for the women's liberation movement in the late 1960s and 1970s; columnist for New York magazine, co-founded Ms. magazine
- Pearl Stewart (born 1950), first African-American woman to edit a major national daily newspaper, the Oakland Tribune
- Ida Tarbell (1857–1944) (USA), muckraking journalist in the early 20th century
- Helen Thomas (1920–2013), 50-year member of White House Press Corps, first female officer of the National Press Club, first female member and president of the White House Correspondents' Association, and first female member of the Gridiron Club
- "Aunt Susan" Edna Vance (1893-1972), American journalist and radio personality
- Mary Heaton Vorse (1874–1966), 20th-century labor journalist
- Homai Vyarawalla (1913–2012), 20th-century Indian photo-journalist
- Betsy Wade (1929–2020), first woman to edit news copy at The New York Times, plaintiff in landmark class-action lawsuit against The New York Times for gender discrimination
- Barbara Walters (born 1929), first woman to anchor an American evening news program on a major television network.
- Ida B. Wells (1862–1931), black American journalist prominent in the civil rights and women's suffrage movements.
- Eileen Welsome (born 1951), won the Pulitzer Prize while with The Albuquerque Tribune for her investigative reporting on human radiation experiments on people during the Cold War.
- Aye Aye Win (born 1953), Burmese journalist and chief of bureau for Associated Press
- Janine Zacharia, Middle East correspondent for The Washington Post.

== Music critics ==
=== Popular music ===
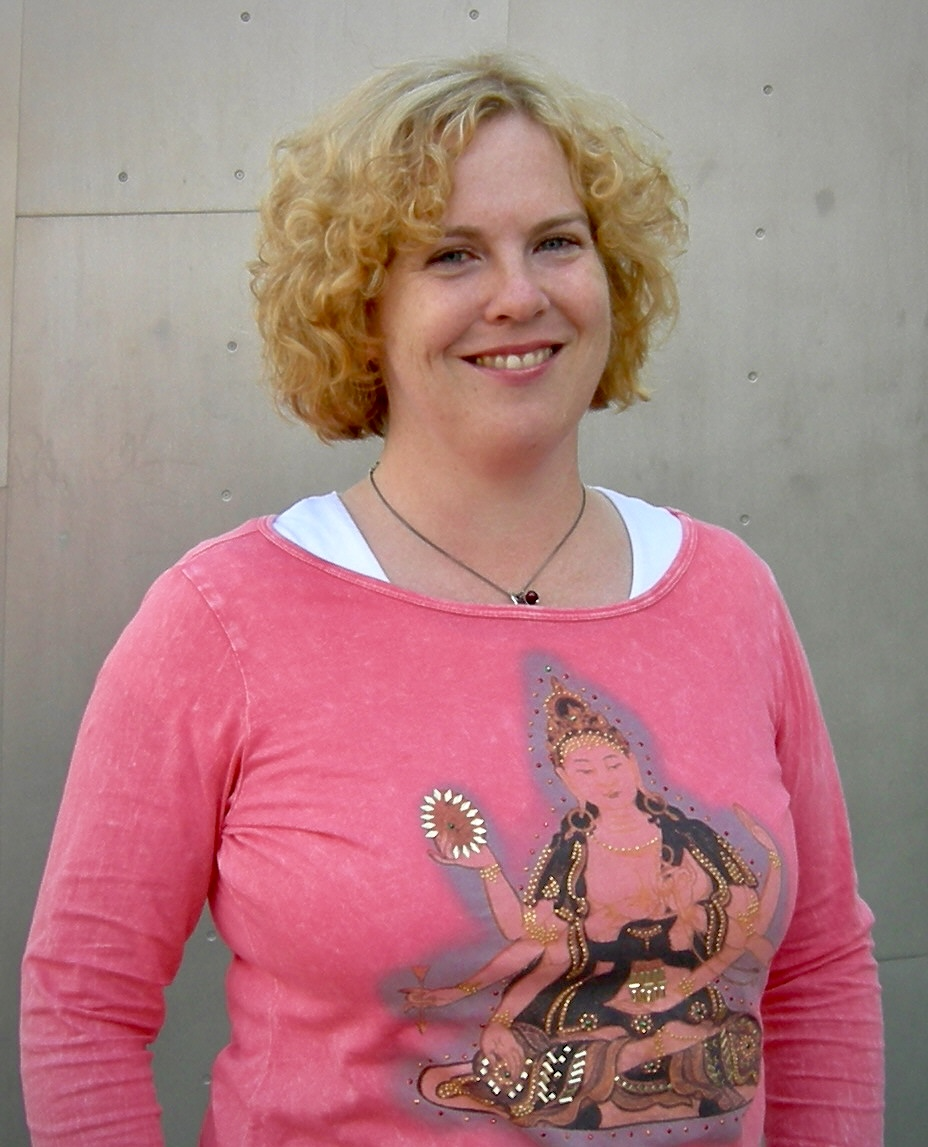
American pop music critic Ann Powers (pictured in 2007)

While there are significant numbers of women vocalists singing in pop and rock music, many other aspects of pop and rock music are male-dominated, including record producing, instrument playing and music journalism. According to Anwen Crawford, the "problem for women [popular music critics] is that our role in popular music was codified long ago", which means that "[b]ooks by living female rock critics (or jazz, hip-hop, and dance-music critics, for that matter) are scant."

Sociologist Simon Frith noted that pop and rock music "are closely associated with gender; that is, with conventions of male and female behaviour." According to Holly Kruse, both popular music articles and academic articles about pop music are usually written from "masculine subject positions." As well, there are relatively few women writing in music journalism: "By 1999, the number of female editors or senior writers at Rolling Stone hovered around...15%, [while] at Spin and Raygun, [it was] roughly 20%." Criticism associated with gender was discussed in a 2014 Jezebel article about the struggles of women in music journalism, written by music critic Tracy Moore, previously an editor at the Nashville Scene.

The American music critic Ann Powers, as a female critic and journalist, has written critiques on the perceptions of sex, racial and social minorities in the music industry. She has also written about feminism. In 2006, she accepted a position as chief pop-music critic at the Los Angeles Times, where she succeeded Robert Hilburn. In 2005, Powers co-wrote the book Piece by Piece with musician Tori Amos, which discusses the role of women in the modern music industry, and features information about composing, touring, performance, and the realities of the music business.

Notable popular music critics include:

- Tanja Bakić
- Raquel Cepeda
- Ann Powers
- Joy Press
- Linda Solomon
- Lillian Roxon
- Penny Valentine

=== Classical music ===
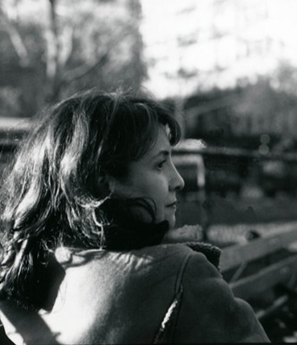
Marion Lignana Rosenberg (1961–2013) was a music critic, writer, translator, broadcaster and journalist. She wrote for many periodicals, including Salon.com, The New York Times and Playbill.

In 2005, the National Arts Journalism Program (NAJP) at Columbia studied arts journalism in America and found that "the average classical music critic is a white, 52-year-old male with a graduate degree, but 26 percent of all critics writing are female." However, William Osborne points out that this 26 percent figure includes all newspapers, including low-circulation regional papers. Osborne states that the "...large US papers, which are the ones that influence public opinion, have virtually no women classical music critics". The only female critics from major US papers are Anne Midgette (The New York Times) and Wynne Delacoma (Chicago Sun-Times). Midgette was the "first woman to cover classical music in the entire history of the paper". Susannah Clapp, a critic from The Guardian–a newspaper that has a female classical music critic–stated in May 2014 that she had only then realized "...what a rarity" a female classical music critic is in journalism.

Notable women classical music critics include:

- Anne Midgette (The New York Times)
- Marion Lignana Rosenberg (1961–2013)

== Awards and organizations ==
- Courage in Journalism Awards, from the International Women's Media Foundation
- The Coalition For Women In Journalism
- UK Woman Political Journalist of the Year Award which aims 'to highlight the achievements of outstanding women role models.'
- Yayori Journalist Award, sponsored by the Women's Fund for Peace and Human Rights
- In 2002, the U.S. Postal Service honored four accomplished female journalists, Nellie Bly, Marguerite Higgins, Ethel L. Payne and Ida M. Tarbell, with the issuance of four 37-cent commemorative postage stamps.
- African Women in the Media (AWiM)
- Journalism and Women Symposium (JAWS)
- Alliance of Women Film Journalists
- Association for Women Journalists
- International Women's Media Foundation
- National Federation of Press Women
- Missouri Lifestyle Journalism Awards

== See also ==
- History of journalism
- Hollywood Women's Press Club
- International Association of Women in Radio and Television
- International Women's Media Foundation
- The Press Institute for Women in the Developing World
- Sob sister
- Society reporting
- Women's page

== Sources ==
This article incorporates text from a free content work. Licensed under CC BY SA 3.0 IGO (license statement/permission). Text taken from World Trends in Freedom of Expression and Media Development Global Report 2018, 202, UNESCO, UNESCO.
