= 1922 United States Senate election in Nevada =

- November 7, 1922
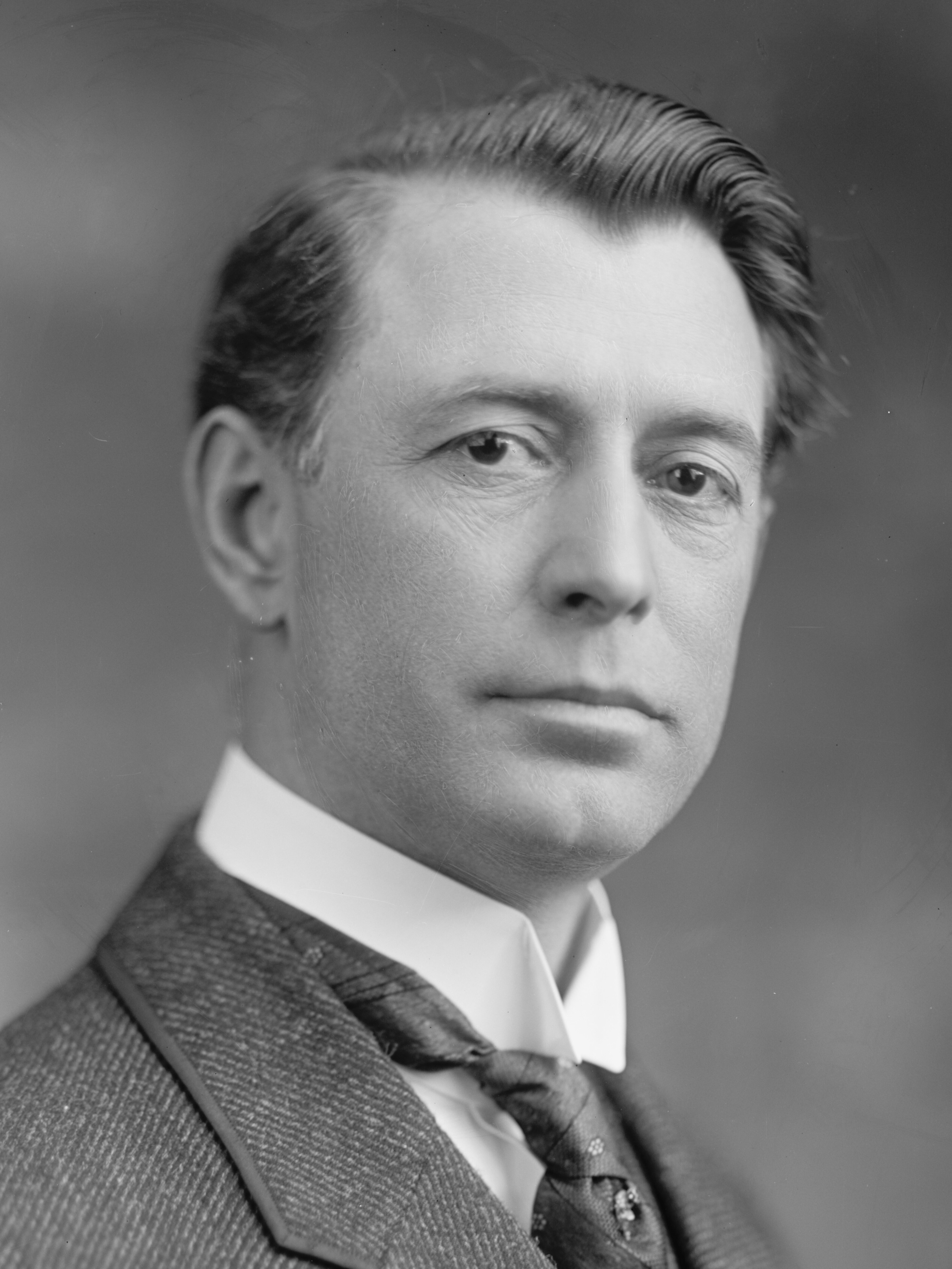

Nominee	Key Pittman	Charles S. Chandler
Party	Democratic	Republican
Popular vote	18,200	10,671
Percentage	63.04%	36.96%
- County results Pittman: 50–60% 60–70% 70–80% Chandler: 50–60% 60–70%
U.S. senator before election
Key Pittman
Democratic
Elected U.S. Senator
Key Pittman
Democratic

The 1922 United States Senate election in Nevada took place on November 7, 1922. Incumbent Democratic Senator Key Pittman won re-election to a third term (second full term) against Charles S. Chandler.

== Primary elections ==
Primary elections were held on September 5, 1922.

=== Democratic primary ===
==== Candidates ====
- Key Pittman, incumbent U.S. Senator

Pittman ran unopposed for the Democratic nomination, so there was no Democratic primary.

=== Republican primary ===
==== Candidates ====
- Charles S. Chandler, Speaker of the Nevada House of Representatives (1921-1923)
- Samuel S. Arentz, U.S. Representative from the at-large district (1921-1923)
- Samuel Platt, former Speaker of the Nevada House of Representatives (1905-1907) and candidate for this seat in 1916
- Peter Buol, former Mayor of Las Vegas (1911-1913) and former member of the Nevada State Senate (1913-1914, 1915-1918)
- Lydia Adams-Williams, writer and conservationist

==== Results ====
Republican primary results
Party	Candidate	Votes	%
Republican	Charles S. Chandler	2,540	29.00
Republican	Samuel S. Arentz	2,225	25.41
Republican	Samuel Platt	2,143	24.47
Republican	Peter Buol	1,403	16.02
Republican	Lydia Adams-Williams	447	5.10
Total votes		8,758	

== General election ==
=== Results ===
1922 United States Senate election in Nevada
Party	Candidate	Votes	%
Democratic	Key Pittman (incumbent)	18,200	63.04
Republican	Charles S. Chandler	10,671	36.96
Majority		7,529	26.08
Turnout		28,871	
Democratic hold			
