= Bolormaa Luntan =

Mongolian journalist

- Died: 2015

Bolormaa Luntan or Luntangiin Bolormaa (Mongolian: Л. Болормаа; died 2015) was a Mongolian journalist and editor who founded The Mongolian Mining Journal. She is regarded as one of the leading figures of a new generation of Mongolian journalism, specializing in economics, business, and mining coverage. Bolormaa died unexpectedly on 21 November 2015. International and Mongolian human rights activists suspected her death was a homicide.

== Education ==
Bolormaa attended Moscow State University of Printing Arts in 1989, and graduated from National University of Mongolia with a bachelor's degree in journalism in 1998. She later pursued further training in economic and business journalism at the International Institute for Journalism (IIJ) in Germany and at the International Center for Journalists in the United States. She also gained newsroom experience at the Washington Post and the Grand Forks Herald in the United States.

== Career ==
Bolormaa began her journalism career in 1998 at the Mongolian newspaper Önöödör ("Today"). Between 2001 and 2008, she served as Deputy Editor and later First Deputy Editor at the paper, where she played a role in introducing Western-style daily newspaper formats and reporting conventions to Mongolia.

In 2008, she founded and became editor of The Mongolian Mining Journal, a bilingual (Mongolian and English) publication covering economic and mining topics. The journal operated as an independent, professional outlet not affiliated with any institution or individual, and was recognized as "National Best Magazine" by the Union of Mongolian Journalists in 2008, 2012, and 2013.

In 2010, L. Bolormaa founded the non-governmental organization "Journalism for Development," which supported young journalists specializing in economic and mining topics. In 2011, she established the "Khögjil" ("Development") television studio, producing economic and mining news programming that aired regularly on the Eagle TV, C1, and Channel 25 television networks.

She also wrote a regular column on the website baabar.mn, covering economic, social, and political topics. Bolormaa's books are widely used as reference material by journalism students and young journalists in Mongolia.

Shortly before her sudden death, Bolormaa had written a series of reports alleging that then Minister of Social Welfare, S. Erdene, had diverted significant budget funds intended for children with disabilities toward private business interests. These allegations were not pursued by either parliament or the police. The minister named in her reporting went on to win re-election to parliament as a Democratic Party candidate in June 2016.

Bolormaa has written a series of articles and blogs on the alleged corruption, involving the former Minister of Road, Transport, Construction and Urban development and former President, Khaltmaagiin Battulga, related to the construction of a new coal transport railroad linking Mongolia and China between 2012 and 2015.

== Death ==
Bolormaa was found dead at her home in Ulaanbaatar on the night of November 21, 2015. She was survived by her two daughters. According to a statement issued by the Globe International Center on 29 February 2016, Mongolia's National Institute of Forensic Science conducted an autopsy and determined that she died of a brain hemorrhage resulting from a concussion to the occipital bone. The institute's representative explained that a fracture of the occipital bone led to a strong concussion, which in turn caused the fatal hemorrhage. The institute's findings were subsequently forwarded to the police, who continued their investigation.

Police investigated the circumstances of her death, and her family, colleagues, and the broader Mongolian journalism community called for a thorough inquiry, including examination of whether her death was connected to her professional work. Her death drew a joint public statement from more than twenty Mongolian civil society and human rights organizations, including Amnesty International Mongolia, the Confederation of Mongolian Journalists, the Media Council of Mongolia, and the Globe International Center, expressing condolences and calling for accountability.

After L. Bolormaa's death, serious rumors circulated on Facebook and among people close to her. Reports emerged that someone had been harassing her by phone and sending her messages. Human rights defenders characterized the case as a killing requiring justice, though as of now the circumstances of her death have not been officially confirmed as a crime, and the police investigation had not concluded.

== Recognition ==
In 2003, Bolormaa received the award for "Best Journalist in Mongolia's Newspaper Sector."

In December 2015, the Union of Mongolian Journalists posthumously named Bolormaa Best Journalist of the Year at its annual awards ceremony honoring leading figures in Mongolian journalism.

In 2016, she was posthumously honored with the Globe International Center's annual Media Freedom Award, "For the Truth!" The award was presented to her brother, Batbayar Luntan, on May 3, 2016, during a roundtable on access to information and fundamental freedoms held to mark World Press Freedom Day. The award, established in 2009, is given annually to journalists and media professionals who contribute to media freedom or face pressure for reporting in the public interest.

== Books ==
- "Reportages in a Dress" (Даашинзтай сурвалжлагууд, 2007) — an account of the challenges and experiences of early post-transition journalism in Mongolia.
- "Busy" (Завгүй, 2014) — a work on media management in modern journalism.
- A Quietly Beating Creative Vein (Чимээгүй лугшиж буй бүтээлч судас) — a book on the development of Mongolia's post-1990 business landscape over the preceding 25 years, left unfinished at the time of her death. It was launched posthumously at the Art House center in Ulaanbaatar on December 11, 2015.

== See also ==
- Corruption in Mongolia
- Women in journalism
- Mass media in Mongolia
- Women in Mongolia
- Safety of journalists
- Human rights in Mongolia

== Official Website ==
https://www.bolormaa.mn/?lang=en
