= Lola Kallikhanova =

Uzbek Journalist (born 1989)

- Lalagúl Qallıxanova
- Born: 1989 (age 36–37)
- Citizenship: Uzbekistan
- Education: Karakalpak State University
- Occupation: Journalist

Lola Kallikhanova (Karakalpak: Lalagúl Qallıxanova; born 1989) is a journalist from Karakalpakstan. She is the founder of the independent news website Makan.uz, reported on COVID-19 in the region, and has been the subject of police intimidation, which was condemned by the Coalition for Women in Journalism. She was prosecuted for disseminating leaflets during riots in 2023; her treatment during the trial was objected to by Human Rights Watch.

== Biography ==
Born in 1989, Kallikhanova graduated in 2010 from Karakalpak State University (kaa). After graduation she studied for a Masters, and subsequently worked at Karakalpak Department of the Chamber of Commerce and Industry as press secretary. She later worked as a radio editor at Nukus FM with journalist Bakhytbek Elmanov. Work at the radio station inspired her to establish the independent news website Makan.uz, which also had a Telegram channel with 65,000 subscribers, as of 2020. She wrote much of the coverage of COVID-19 in Karakalpakstan. She has also written on gender disparity.

In 2020, Kallikhanova was the subject of police intimidation: she was picked up by six police cars in the middle of the night, who took her phone, and she was questioned for three hours before release. This treatment of Kallikhanova and other journalists was condemned by the Coalition for Women in Journalism.

Kallikhanova was prosecuted in January 2023, and sentenced to three years of a suspended sentence. She was accused of disseminating separatist materials during riots on 1-2 July 2022 in Nukus. She was reported missing after these events, but her whereabouts later became known. During the trial she pleaded guilty and, when questioned about a video that she posted, expressed regret over her actions and the violence of the riots. Human Rights Watch objected to her treatment, and that of other journalists, describing it as "unfair".
