= Jennie Irene Mix =

American music critic and writer

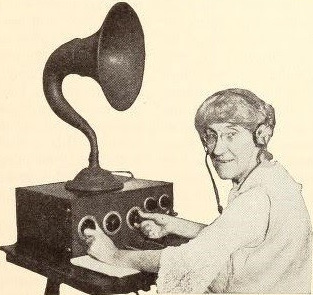
- Mix, from her 1925 obituary in Radio Broadcast magazine
- Born: 1862; Cleveland, Ohio
- Died: April 26, 1925 (aged 62–63); Toledo, Ohio
- Occupations: Music critic; journalist; novelist; editor
- Writing career
- Notable works: At Fame's Gateway, Mighty Animals

Jennie Irene Mix (1862–1925) was an American music critic, journalist, novelist, and editor.

== Early life ==
She was born in Cleveland, Ohio, to Lorenzo Dow Mix and Jane Sylvia Gardner. She studied classical music in Cleveland, New York, and Germany, and then pursued a career in journalism.

== Career ==
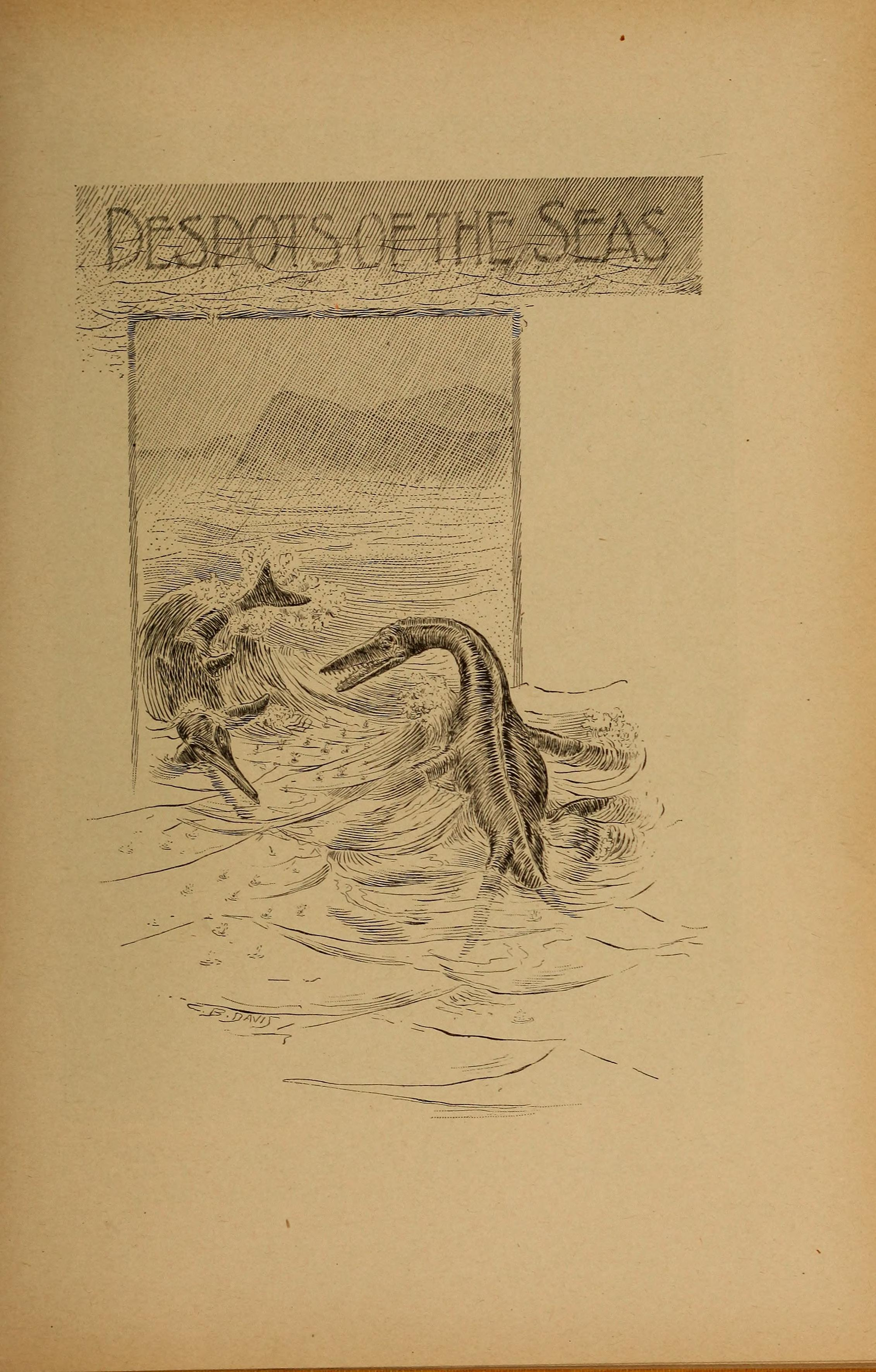
Page 63 from Mix's book Mighty Animals

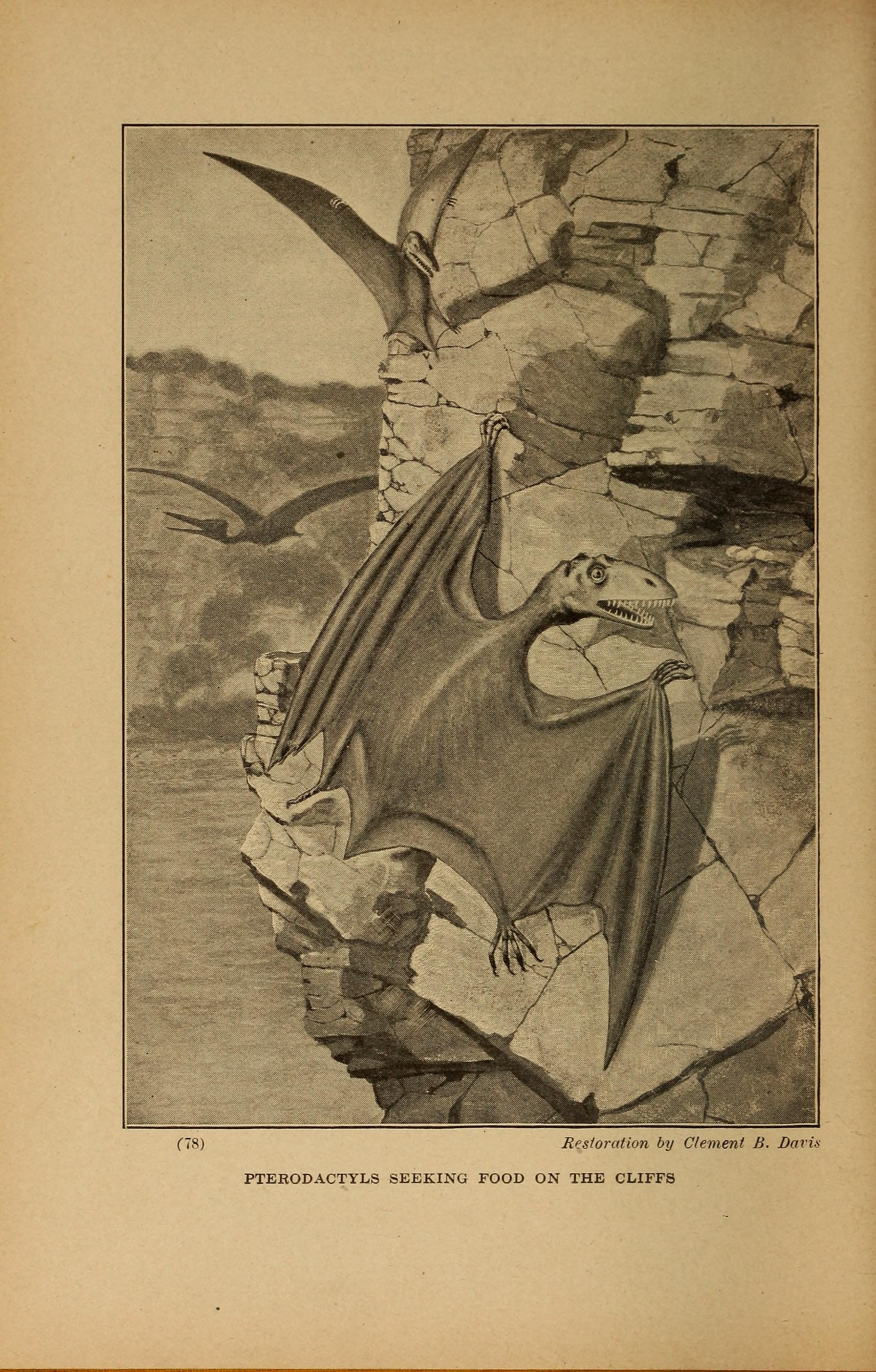
Page 78 of Mix's Mighty Animals

She was a trained classical pianist, and later worked as a music critic for the Toledo Times and book review editor and critic for the Pittsburgh Post. During the 1920s when radio was reaching broad popularity, she was one of only a few female editors covering radio in journalism, working as an editor at Radio Broadcast (Magazine) from 1924 until her death in April 1925. She authored a column entitled "The Listeners' Point of View" in Radio Broadcast that discussed radio broadcast programs, especially relating to music.

Mix also wrote books on several topics, including a popular novel, At Fame's Gateway; the Romance of a Pianiste, Mighty Animals: Being Short Talks About Some of the Animals Which Lived on This Earth Before Man Appeared, and Great Pictures and Their Painters: A Series of Articles on Some of the Medici Prints Owned by the Carnegie Library of Pittsburgh.

Mighty Animals was an apparent departure from previous writing topics. It was one of the first texts on paleontology written for children. It includes a foreword by the director of the American Museum of Natural History, Dr. Frederic Lucas. The book discusses various types of extinct animals (primarily dinosaurs), how fossils are formed, and how field work is conducted, and contains numerous illustrations and photographs.

== Death ==
Jennie Irene Mix died on April 26, 1925, in Toledo, Ohio.
