= Venice Tipton Spraggs =

American journalist (1905-1956)

- Born: 1905; Birmingham, Alabama
- Died: 1956 (aged 50–51)
- Occupation: Journalist

Venice Tipton Spraggs (1905 – 1956) was an American journalist. She is known for being the Washington Bureau Chief for The Chicago Defender.

Spraggs née Tipton was born in 1908 in Birmingham, Alabama. She attended Spelman College. Spraggs was the Washington Bureau Chief for The Chicago Defender. Her column in The Chicago Defender was titled "Women in the National Picture". In 1947 Spraggs became the first Black to be elected to Theta Sigma Phi (now the Association for Women in Communications).

Spraggs died in 1956 at the age of 51.

The printing plate of a portrait of Spraggs that was used by The Chicago Defender is in the collection of the Smithsonian's National Museum of African American History and Culture.
