= Zilfa Estcourt =

American writer

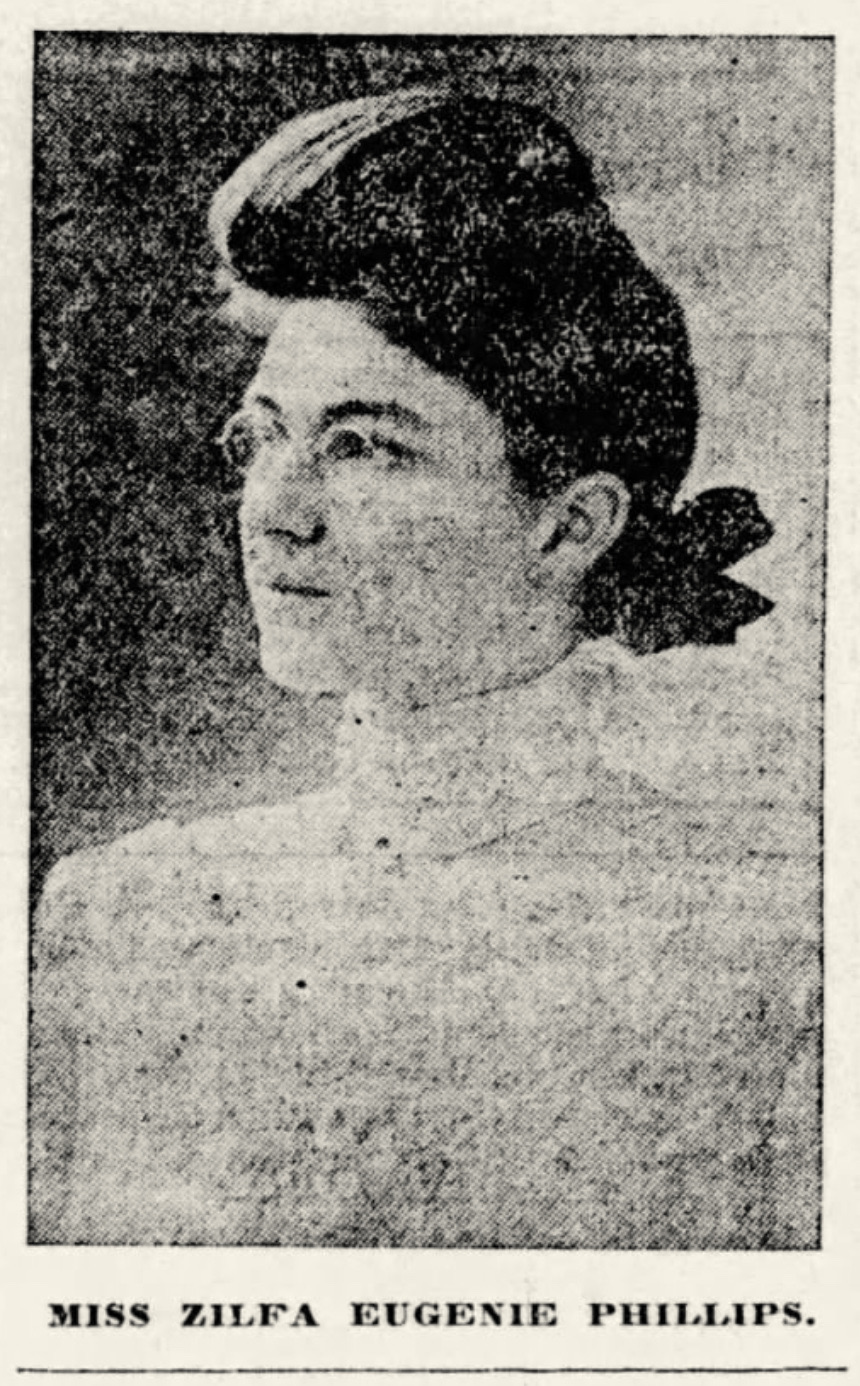
- Excerpted from May 1904 news story simultaneously commemorating Phillips' college graduation and post-graduate scholarship.
- Born: Zilpha Eugenie Phillips; May 3, 1883; Black River Falls, Wisconsin, U.S.
- Died: December 17, 1959 (aged 76); San Francisco, California, U.S.
- Other name: Zilfa Phillips
- Education: Whitworth College, University of Chicago
- Occupation: Journalist
- Years active: 1914–1948
- Spouse: Harry Slocum Estcourt (m. 1921; died 1937)

Zilfa Estcourt (born Zilpha Eugenie Phillips, May 3, 1883 – December 17, 1959) was an American newspaper columnist and editor. Described variously as "the dean of west coast woman writers" and as being "to newspapers what Ethel Barrymore is to the stage," Estcourt was the women's editor at the Tacoma Tribune and San Francisco Chronicle.

== Early life and career ==
On May 3, 1883, Zilpha Eugenie Phillips was born in Black River Falls, Wisconsin, the oldest of four children born to Thomas Henry Phillips and Emma Eugenie Jesse. Sometime between 1991 and 1900, the family relocated to Tacoma, Washington, and, in 1904, Pillips received a Bachelor of Art's degree from Whitworth College in Spokane. At that time, she was awarded a scholarship to the University of Chicago, where she earned her master's degree the following year.

== Death ==
On December 17, 1959, Estcourt, whose health had been failing since her retirement in 1949, died in a San Francisco nursing home.
