= Kiran Nazish =

Pakistani journalist

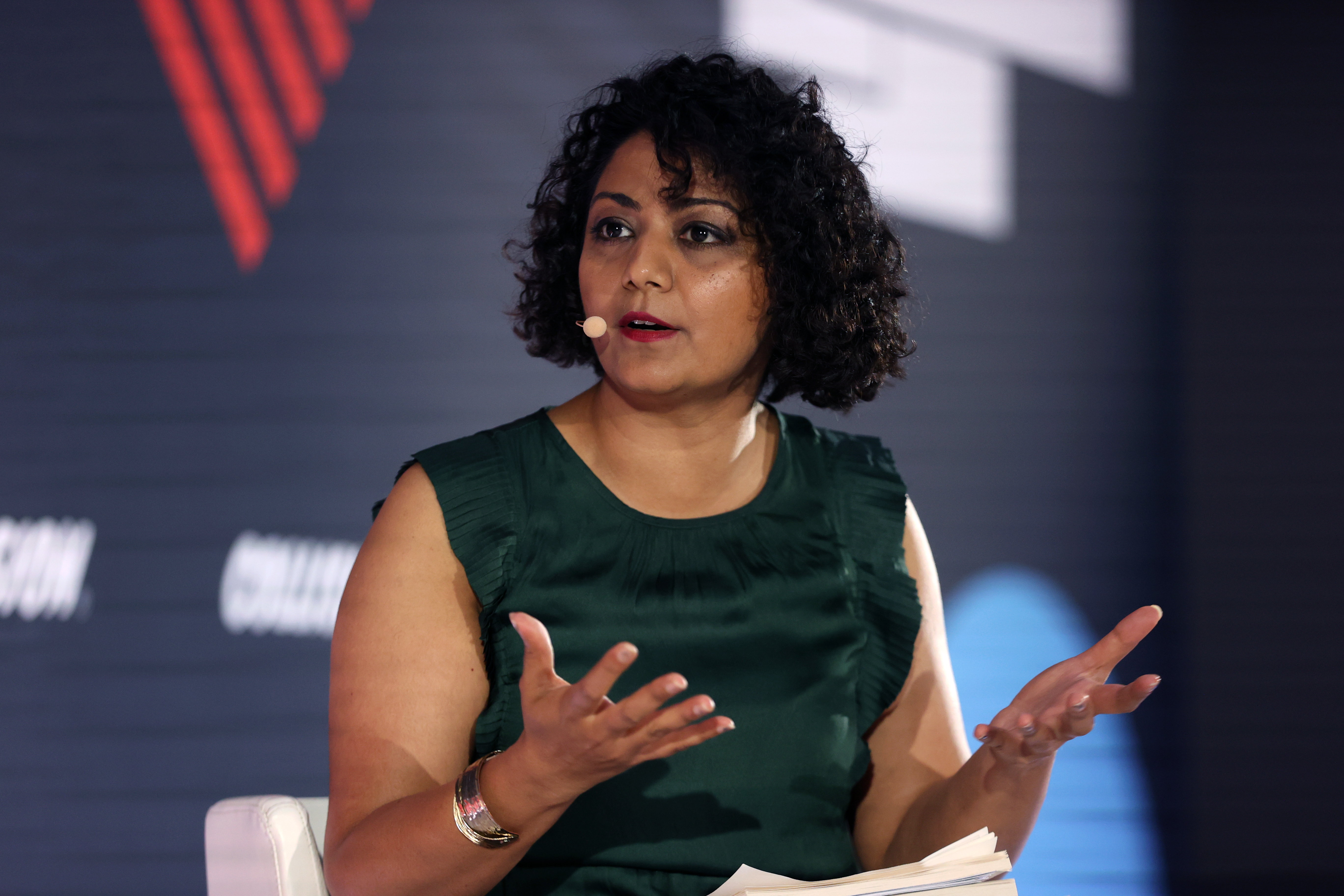
- Nazish in 2022
- Born: Pakistan
- Occupation: Journalist

Kiran Nazish is a Pakistani journalist. She has worked as a foreign correspondent around the world, including the Middle East and South Asia. Nazish founded and is the director of the Coalition For Women In Journalism, a worldwide support organization for female journalists.

== Early life and education ==
Nazish was born and raised in Pakistan in a middle class family. She was interested in journalism from a young age, but her father pushed her to study science and engineering. Beginning at age seven, she began writing short pieces for the children's section of Dawn. She became an intern at a newspaper as a teenager.

At university, Nazish studied economics and math and statistics, but continued to work as a journalist as well.

== Career ==
In the early 2000s, Nazish began her career in print journalism and went on to work in other media, including radio and television. Nazish has won awards for her work and has extensively covered conflict, peace and security in South Asia and the Middle East.

=== Coverage in Asia ===
==== Pakistan ====
Her work included stories from Pakistan's tribal regions. She wrote, "I wanted to learn how journalists work in the Federally Administered Tribal Areas, a semiautonomous, conflict-ridden region made up of seven tribal 'agencies' along the Afghan border known as the 'war zone.' Twelve journalists have been killed there since the terrorist attacks in the US on 9/11. If Pakistan is the worst place to be a journalist, FATA is the worst of the worst." In Pakistan, she reported from the conflict-ridden FATA under Taliban control and later when the Pakistan Army started its operation against terrorists in the region.

==== ISIS ====
She wrote several stories on the ISIS offensive against Kobani in late 2014. In one article, Nazish observed: "Many dead bodies of Islamic States fighters are strewn across street corners, and this is creating a hygiene issue for the children and pregnant women still living inside." In 2015, Nazish catalogued the experiences of journalists working out of Mosul, Iraq. "Journalists are beaten or executed as spies... the militant group ISIS began rounding up journalists suspected of leaking negative information about the Islamic State," she reported. That year she also wrote about ISIS in Pakistan. Nazish produced reports on civilians trapped in Aleppo during 2016.

=== Daniel Pearl fellow ===
She was the Daniel Pearl fellow in 2014, at which time she worked at The New York Times. While at the newspaper, Nazish focused on terrorism courts in Manhattan, the NYPD and the New York Muslim community. Nazish contributed reporting at the foreign desk.

=== Coalition For Women In Journalism ===
Nazish is founding director of the Coalition For Women In Journalism, which pioneered the first global mentorship program for mid-career women journalists. The organization emphasizes the safety, wellbeing and growth of women journalists. The organization launched in 2017 and worked as a pro-bono organization. In 2019, The Coalition For Women In Journalism received funding support from Craig Newmark Philanthropies. The organization initiated its advocacy, including documentation of the threats and abuse that women journalists face globally. The Coalition established a network in several countries, each including local mentors, who offer guidance to CFWIJ Fellows in their respective local language. Nazish sought to address gaps she saw in the industry and threats that women journalists face. "In a precarious and largely misogynist environment, female journalists feel stressed, stuck and often tired," she said in an interview. Nazish spoke at length about issues that women journalists face across the globe, and produced a research article for Women's Media Center on how women journalists work in Mexico.

Women Press Freedom, originally called the Press Freedom Initiative, was launched by Nazish and her colleagues at the Coalition For Women in Journalism. It aims to document "every single attack, threat, or violation of press freedom" experiences by women journalists and LGBTQ journalists.

=== Academia ===
Nazish is the Stanley Knowles Distinguished Professor for 2019-2020 and is teaching journalism to undergraduate students at Brandon University. She taught courses such as Covering Conflict and International Journalism at the O.P. Jindal Global University in Delhi, India. She initiated journalism training programs and fellowships through her initiative at the Lahore University of Management Sciences (LUMS).

In 2026, Nazish endorsed Avi Lewis in that year's federal NDP leadership race.

== Personal life ==
While investigating a story involving the influence of intelligence agencies on democratic institutions in Pakistan, Nazish received death threats and was forced to drop the story. In the wake of the threats, Nazish lived in self-exile for years. She was vocal about the threats women journalists faced during the time, and the impunity that the culprits enjoy.

== Recognition ==
Nazish received an Agahi Award in 2013 for best reporting for her story on internally displaced children in Dawn and was nominated for other pieces during 2012. Her work was on the Foreign Policy AfPak Channels' Top 10 of 2012. Her interview with Pakistani politician (and Prime Minister elect in 2018) Imran Khan made the list. It was the year's fifth most read piece. In 2019, Splice Watch featured her on their People to Watch list for 2019.
