= Madeleine Fauconnier =

Madeleine Fauconnier (1725–1784) was a French journalist and editor.

She was born to the merchant André Louis Fauconnier and Madeleine Marguerine Gournay.

In her early career, she was active as an actor at the private theater of the Duke of Gramont. She was the mistress of the Duke of Gramont between 1749 and 1752, and then became a courtesan.

Between 1764 and 1782, she was the editor of the Parisian newspaper Nécrologe, which was a successful publication, until the paper was incorporated in to the Journal de Paris in 1782.
