= Marion Lignana Rosenberg =

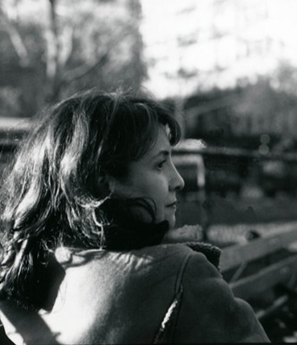
- Born: Marion Catherine Connell; December 8, 1961; New Jersey, USA
- Died: November 28, 2013 (aged 51); Albany, New York, USA
- Occupations: Writer, journalist
- Writing career
- Notable works: "Re-visioning Callas", "Maria Callas" for Notable American Women

Marion Lignana Rosenberg (/ma.ʁjɔ̃ liˈɲaːna roːsən.ˈbærg/; December 8, 1961 – November 28, 2013) was an American writer, music critic, translator and a broadcaster and journalist who blogged for WQXR Operavore and had a weekly column called Prima Fila for La Voce di New York. She contributed features, reviews, and essays about the arts to NewMusicBox, Town & Country, Newsday, Time Out New York, The Wall Street Journal, Capital New York, The Classical Review, Salon.com, Forward, The New York Times, San Francisco Chronicle, Boston, Opera News, and Playbill. Rosenberg's essay "Re-visioning Callas" won a Newswomen's Club of New York Front Page Award. She also wrote an entry on Maria Callas for Notable American Women: Completing the Twentieth Century (Harvard University Press).

== Early life ==
Rosenberg was born in New Jersey to an Italian family from Piedmont, Italy. She was elected to Phi Beta Kappa and graduated from Harvard University with highest honors in Romance Languages and Literature. She studied theatre and opera history at the University of Florence and comparative literature at the University of California, Berkeley.

== Career ==
Rosenberg was a certified translator of both Italian and French and she admired vintage and contemporary European pop (including Luigi Tenco, Serge Gainsbourg, Françoise Hardy, Jacques Brel, Georges Brassens, Jacques Dutronc, Lucio Battisti, Gianmaria Testa, Ivano Fossati, and Carla Bruni). Among contemporary musicians, her favourite was Rufus Wainwright.

She spoke English, Italian and French fluently.

== Death ==
Rosenberg died suddenly on the night of November 28, 2013, of a pulmonary embolism following Thanksgiving dinner at a friend's house in Endwell, New York. News of her death came out on December 2, 2013, six days before her 52nd birthday, and the day of Maria Callas' 90th birthday celebration, who was her idol and the main subject of her studies.

== Works of Marion Lignana Rosenberg ==
The essay "Re-visioning Callas", published in (the now-defunct) USItalia, won a Front Page Award from the Newswomen's Club of New York, and represents the germ of her most acclaimed project.

The judges' citation read in part: "Maria Callas died in 1977 at age 53, but her tempestuous legend lives on. This essay is written with the same extraordinary passion and fire that characterized the opera diva's career. Offered up on the occasion of Callas's 90th birthday, this article acknowledges but righteously dismisses the 'petty, salacious lore' of the woman's private life and celebrates the performer's extreme dedication to her art [and] her lasting gifts to music. Whether you agree or disagree, it's a compelling, absorbing read from start to finish. Bravo!"
