= Louise Flodin =

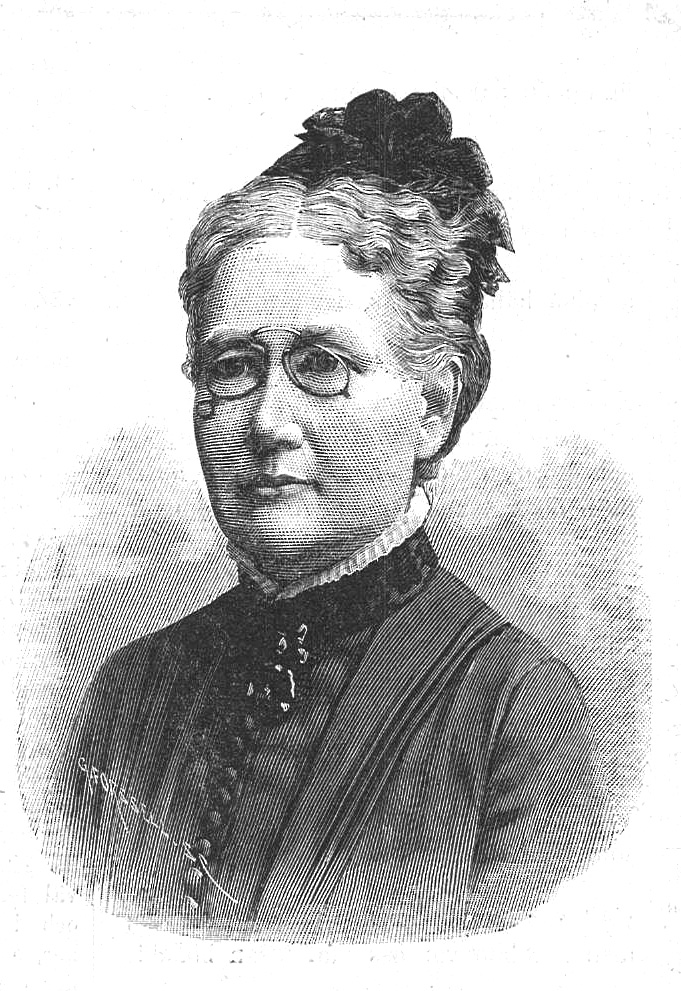
- Born: Louise Charlotta Kristiana Söderqvist; 17 September 1828
- Died: 20 March 1923 (aged 94)
- Occupation: Journalist

Louise Charlotta Kristiana Flodin, née Söderqvist (17 September 1828 – 20 March 1923), was a Swedish journalist, typographer, feminist and publisher. She was seen as the first woman in Sweden to be given a newspaper licence.

== Life ==
Flodin was born in Örebro, were her mother managed a school. Originally a teacher in her mother's school, she became an apprentice at a printing shop in 1856, and educated herself in typography, then unusual for a woman. She bought a printing press in Arboga in 1858, and started to publish the Arboga Tidning (Arboga Paper), which had one number a week.

In the beginning, she was the only employee of her paper and performed all the tasks. She employed only women to the paper: this was deliberate, because she wished to educate females to become typographers and journalists and thereby make the profession more available to them. She supervised all phases in the making of the paper from the writing to the printing and instructed her own typographers in the profession from the start.

She was not the first female editor in Sweden - women founded and managed papers in the 18th century - but she was the first woman to be officially licensed as such, and she was seen by her contemporaries as a pioneer who opened a new field of profession for women.

In 1862, the paper was sold, and she moved to Stockholm, where she started and published the paper Iris in 1862–64, and in 1862–74 was a publisher and the manager of a printing press, were the staff consisted only of women. When women were officially admitted to the Publicistklubben (Swedish Publicists' Association) in 1885, she was one of the first to be admitted.

She married the publisher Sigfrid Flodin in 1865.

== See also ==
- Anna Hammar-Rosén
- Elsa Fougt
- Sofia Gumaelius
