= Coalition For Women In Journalism =

Organization

- Formation: 2017
- Type: Non-profit NGO
- Purpose: To foster and supports camaraderie between women journalists around the globe
- Headquarters: New York, New York
- Region served: United States
- Founding Director: Kiran Nazish
- Staff: 12
- Volunteers: 1,000+
- Website: www.womeninjournalism.org

The Coalition For Women In Journalism (CFWIJ) is a New York–based global press freedom organization focused on women and non-binary journalists. Since 2019, the non-profit organization has monitored violations against journalists in 145 countries and provided relocation support to more than 2000 journalists in times of conflict and crises. The organization is supported by Craig Newmark Philanthropies.

== Background ==
The Coalition For Women In Journalism, also known as The Coalition or CFWIJ, is a support organization for female journalists from around the globe. It was founded by the journalist Kiran Nazish in 2017 in New York as a pro-bono organization, and launched as an NGO in later 2018. "Instead of competing with each other in a male-created, male-dominated environment, we want to empower women by empowering each other," Nazish said in an interview. After the launch, CFWIJ became the first not-for-profit to offer long-form mentorship to female journalists in mid-career from western and non-western countries. Chapters specific to the region were launched in Turkey, Middle East, South Asia, Europe, Pakistan, and Mexico in 2018 and 2019, with prominent female women journalists in respective regions as core members.

== Mentorship program ==
As part of its mentorship program, The Coalition has mentored dozens of women journalists across the world. Its mentors are divided in three categories - global mentors, mentors based in chapters (Mexico/Latin America and Asia) and #HEFORSHE allies.

== Advocacy work ==
The Coalition's advocacy work involves rallying for the safety and equality of women journalists both on and off the field. It has been known to focus on cases that sometimes slip the news circuit. In November 2018, the organization held a #HearMeToo roundtable in Pakistan, which focused on the gaps in the industry that women journalists had to face. The event looked at whether ‘hard' beats were made inaccessible for women journalists in the industry. During 2019, the organization seems to have produced a couple of delegations for different issues related to women journalists. One meeting took place in Pakistan in July 2019 with Human Rights minister Shireen Mazari where the government took a clear stance against harassment of women journalists for the first time in the history of the country.

A month later, in July 2019, the organization took another delegation to the Federal Ombudsperson for harassment, Kashmala Tariq, where the two agreed to collaborate to help build a harassment-free work environment for women journalists.

Towards the end of 2019, the organization held a series of events in Turkey, including talks and delegations, focusing on the safety of women journalists. Members of the organization, including founding director Kiran Nazish met with EAK Turkey, took a delegation to government officials with CHP Women's Branch, and conducted a discussion propagating safety for women journalists in collaboration with Turkey's Journalists' Union (TGS). In October 2019, the organization held a number of talks and discussions at the FELICH festival in Mexico.

In 2020 the treatment of Uzbek journalist Lola Kallikhanova and others was condemned by the Coalition.

== JSafe app ==
During February 2020, CFWIJ began beta testing a new safety and documentation app for journalists called the JSafe app. It was developed in collaboration with the Reynolds Journalism Institute at the University of Missouri. It took more than a year to develop and is currently available for iPhones. An Android version is also said to be under development.

The app is a part of CFWIJ's advocacy efforts to make journalism safer for women journalists. It helps journalists, especially women journalists, report threats, attacks and abuse that they face on the job. Journalists can ask for a follow-up, assistance or look for help through the app, which is provided by the CFWIJ.
