= Pearl Stewart =

Newspaper editor

Pearl Stewart was the editor of the Oakland Tribune for one year beginning December 1992, the first African-American woman editor of a metropolitan daily newspaper. Said to be "well known for her dogged reporting," she was hired by David Burgin, who took a seven-month absence. The Tribune had recently been bought by the Alameda Newspaper Group where Burgin was editor-in-chief. She was intent on keeping the style the Tribune had had previously, saying that the negative stories about Oakland were important because it would be wrong to only highlight the good. Stewart resigned when Burgin returned, saying that she respected him "but it is not possible for me to work with" him. At this time the newspaper was criticized for a lack of focus on minorities in Oakland. Before her position as editor for the Oakland Tribune she had been a reporter for the San Francisco Chronicle from 1980 to 1991.

Later, she was director of career development and an instructor at Florida A&M's School of Journalism and Graphic Communication. While there she started the website Black College Wire which promotes journalism among historically black colleges and universities (HBCUs). In January 2005 she became managing editor of the "black-oriented Chicago Defender", but resigned two months later.
