= Lydia Adams-Williams =

American writer and conservationist

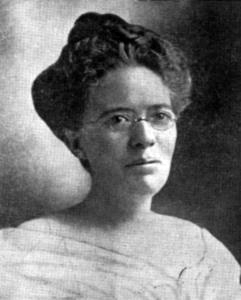
- Born: Mary Lydia Adams; July 18, 1867; Genoa, Nevada
- Died: March 6, 1928 (aged 60); Los Angeles, California

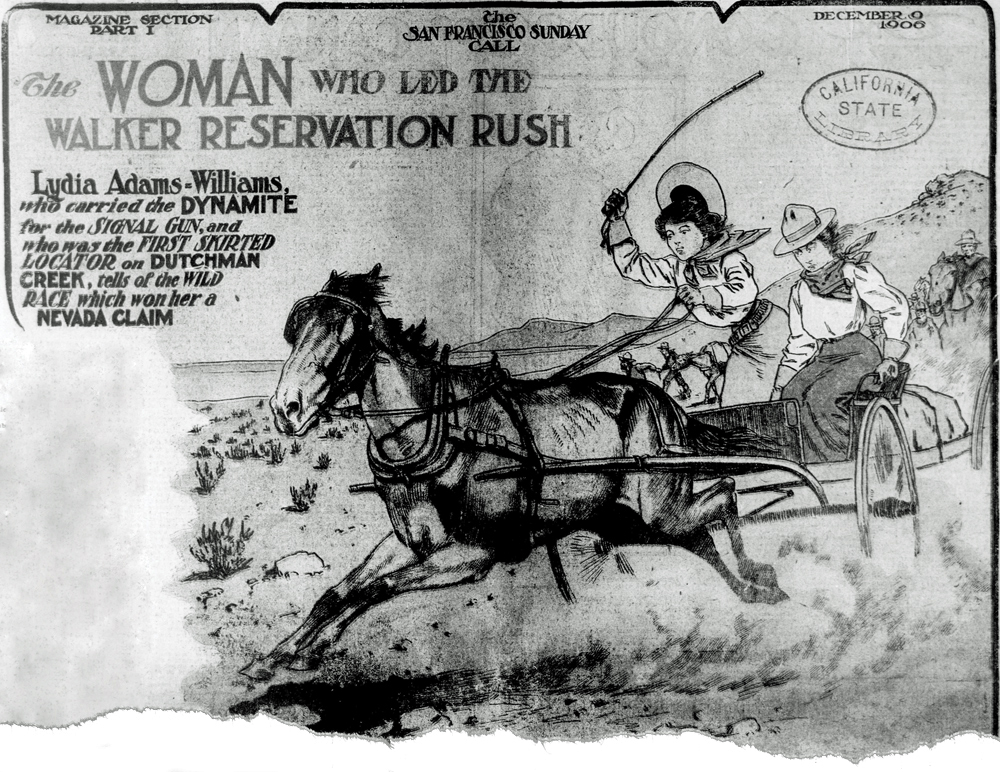
Illustration of Lydia Adams-Williams from the San Francisco Call, 1906

Lydia Adams-Williams (1867–1928) was an American writer and conservationist.

== Personal life ==
Adams-Williams was born in Genoa, Nevada on July 18, 1867. She attended San Jose Normal School and Stanford University. In 1890, she married Delbert Williams, publisher of the Genoa Courier newspaper, divorcing him in 1898.

Adams-Williams died in Los Angeles, California on March 6, 1928.

== Career ==
In the early 1900s, Adams-Williams staked a claim for gold in the Dutch Creek region of Nevada. Her claim did not pan out but she wrote a column about her experience for The San Francisco Call. Adams-Williams went on to pursue a career in Washington, D.C. working for the United States Department of Agriculture, and as a journalist. One of the topics she wrote and lectured on was the topic of conservation and the problem of deforestation. Her article Conservation–Women's Work was included in the July 1908 issue of Forestry & Irrigation. In 1915 her profile of Mrs. Emmons Crocker was included in the American Forestry Association's journal American Forestry.

In 1921, Adams-Williams ran unsuccessfully for a United States Senate seat in Nevada.

Adams-Williams was a member of the Woman's National Press Association and the International League of Press Clubs.
