= Political party strength in Nevada =

Politics in the US state of Nevada

Party registration as of May 1, 2026
Party	Total voters	Percentage
Democratic	666,031	27.2%
Republican	656,502	26.8%
Nonpartisan	965,011	39.4%
Independent American	103,788	4.2%
Libertarian	18,241	0.7%
Other parties	41,108	1.7%
Total	2,450,681	100.00%

The following table indicates the party of elected officials in the U.S. state of Nevada:

- Governor
- Lieutenant Governor
- Secretary of State
- Attorney General
- State Treasurer
- State Controller

The table also indicates the historical party composition in the:

- State Senate
- State Assembly
- State delegation to the U.S. Senate
- State delegation to the U.S. House of Representatives

For years in which a presidential election was held, the table indicates which party's nominees received the state's electoral votes as well as whether the nominees won the election.

== 1861–1982 ==
Year	Executive offices						State Legislature		United States Congress			Electoral votes
Year	Governor	Lt. Governor	Secretary of State	Attorney General	Treasurer	Controller	Senate	Assembly	Senator (Class I)	Senator (Class III)	House	Electoral votes
1861	James W. Nye (R) (Note: Governor of Nevada Territory.)		Orion Clemens (R) (Note: Secretary of Nevada Territory.)	Benjamin B. Bunker (Note: Attorney General of Nevada Territory.)	John Henry Kinkead (R) (Note: Treasurer of Nevada Territory.)	Perry G. Childs (Note: Auditor of Nevada Territory.)					John Cradlebaugh (I) (Note: Delegate to the U.S. House of Representatives from Nevada Territory.)	
1862	James W. Nye (R)		Orion Clemens (R)	Theodore D. Edwards	John Henry Kinkead (R)	Perry G. Childs					John Cradlebaugh (I)	
1863	James W. Nye (R)		Orion Clemens (R)	Theodore D. Edwards	John Henry Kinkead (R)	Perry G. Childs					Gordon Newell Mott (R)	
1864	James W. Nye (R)		Orion Clemens (R)	Theodore D. Edwards	John Henry Kinkead (R)	William W. Ross (Note: Appointed by governor.)					Gordon Newell Mott (R)	
1864	Nevada admitted to the Union on October 31, 1864											
1864	Henry G. Blasdel (R)	John S. Crosman (R)	Chauncey N. Noteware (R)	George A. Nourse (R)	Eben Rhoades (R) (Note: Died in office.)	Alanson W. Nightingill (R)					Henry G. Worthington (R)	Lincoln/ Johnson (NU) ✓
1865	Henry G. Blasdel (R)	John S. Crosman (R)	Chauncey N. Noteware (R)	George A. Nourse (R)	Eben Rhoades (R)	Alanson W. Nightingill (R)	17R, 1D	34R, 1D	William M. Stewart (R)	James W. Nye (R)	Delos R. Ashley (R)	Lincoln/ Johnson (NU) ✓
1866	Henry G. Blasdel (R)	John S. Crosman (R)	Chauncey N. Noteware (R)	George A. Nourse (R)	Eben Rhoades (R)	Alanson W. Nightingill (R)	17R, 1D	34R, 1D	William M. Stewart (R)	James W. Nye (R)	Delos R. Ashley (R)	Lincoln/ Johnson (NU) ✓
1867	Henry G. Blasdel (R)	James S. Slingerland (R)	Chauncey N. Noteware (R)	Robert M. Clarke (R)	Eben Rhoades (R)	William K. Parkinson (R)	18R, 1D	37R, 1D	William M. Stewart (R)	James W. Nye (R)	Delos R. Ashley (R)	Lincoln/ Johnson (NU) ✓
1868	Henry G. Blasdel (R)	James S. Slingerland (R)	Chauncey N. Noteware (R)	Robert M. Clarke (R)	Eben Rhoades (R)	William K. Parkinson (R)	18R, 1D	37R, 1D	William M. Stewart (R)	James W. Nye (R)	Delos R. Ashley (R)	Grant/ Colfax (R) ✓
1869	Henry G. Blasdel (R)	James S. Slingerland (R)	Chauncey N. Noteware (R)	Robert M. Clarke (R)	Eben Rhoades (R)	Lewis Doran (R)	15R, 5D	34R, 5D	William M. Stewart (R)	James W. Nye (R)	Thomas Fitch (R)	Grant/ Colfax (R) ✓
1870	Henry G. Blasdel (R)	James S. Slingerland (R)	Chauncey N. Noteware (R)	Robert M. Clarke (R)	Christopher C. Batterman (R)	Lewis Doran (R)	15R, 5D	34R, 5D	William M. Stewart (R)	James W. Nye (R)	Thomas Fitch (R)	Grant/ Colfax (R) ✓
1871	Lewis R. Bradley (D)	Frank Denver (D)	James D. Minor (R)	Luther A. Buckner (D)	Jerry Schooling (D)	William W. Hobart (R)	14R, 9D	24R, 20D, 2IR	William M. Stewart (R)	James W. Nye (R)	Charles West Kendall (D)	Grant/ Colfax (R) ✓
1872	Lewis R. Bradley (D)	Frank Denver (D)	James D. Minor (R)	Luther A. Buckner (D)	Jerry Schooling (D)	William W. Hobart (R)	14R, 9D	24R, 20D, 2IR	William M. Stewart (R)	James W. Nye (R)	Charles West Kendall (D)	Grant/ Wilson (R) ✓
1873	Lewis R. Bradley (D)	Frank Denver (D)	James D. Minor (R)	Luther A. Buckner (D)	Jerry Schooling (D)	William W. Hobart (R)	17R, 7D	36R, 11D, 1I	William M. Stewart (R)	John P. Jones (R)	Charles West Kendall (D)	Grant/ Wilson (R) ✓
1874	Lewis R. Bradley (D)	Frank Denver (D)	James D. Minor (R)	Luther A. Buckner (D)	Jerry Schooling (D)	William W. Hobart (R)	17R, 7D	36R, 11D, 1I	William M. Stewart (R)	John P. Jones (R)	Charles West Kendall (D)	Grant/ Wilson (R) ✓
1875	Lewis R. Bradley (D)	Jewett W. Adams (D)	James D. Minor (R)	John R. Kittrell (D)	Jerry Schooling (D)	William W. Hobart (R)	17R, 8D	32R, 18D	William Sharon (R)	John P. Jones (R)	William Woodburn (R)	Grant/ Wilson (R) ✓
1876	Lewis R. Bradley (D)	Jewett W. Adams (D)	James D. Minor (R)	John R. Kittrell (D)	Jerry Schooling (D)	William W. Hobart (R)	17R, 8D	32R, 18D	William Sharon (R)	John P. Jones (R)	William Woodburn (R)	Hayes/ Wheeler (R) ✓
1877	Lewis R. Bradley (D)	Jewett W. Adams (D)	James D. Minor (R)	John R. Kittrell (D)	Jerry Schooling (D)	William W. Hobart (R)	13D, 12R	35R, 15D	William Sharon (R)	John P. Jones (R)	Thomas Wren (R)	Hayes/ Wheeler (R) ✓
1878	Lewis R. Bradley (D)	Jewett W. Adams (D)	James D. Minor (R)	John R. Kittrell (D)	Jerry Schooling (D)	William W. Hobart (R)	13D, 12R	35R, 15D	William Sharon (R)	John P. Jones (R)	Thomas Wren (R)	Hayes/ Wheeler (R) ✓
1879	John Henry Kinkead (R)	Jewett W. Adams (D)	Jasper Babcock (R)	Michael A. Murphy (R)	Lyman L. Crockett (R)	James F. Hallock (R)	17R, 7D, 1Cit	39R, 8D, 3Cit	William Sharon (R)	John P. Jones (R)	Rollin M. Daggett (R)	Hayes/ Wheeler (R) ✓
1880	John Henry Kinkead (R)	Jewett W. Adams (D)	Jasper Babcock (R)	Michael A. Murphy (R)	Lyman L. Crockett (R)	James F. Hallock (R)	17R, 7D, 1Cit	39R, 8D, 3Cit	William Sharon (R)	John P. Jones (R)	Rollin M. Daggett (R)	Hancock/ English (D) ✗
1881	John Henry Kinkead (R)	Jewett W. Adams (D)	Jasper Babcock (R)	Michael A. Murphy (R)	Lyman L. Crockett (R)	James F. Hallock (R)	14R, 10D, 1Cit	44D, 6R	James G. Fair (D)	John P. Jones (R)	George W. Cassidy (D)	Hancock/ English (D) ✗
1882	John Henry Kinkead (R)	Jewett W. Adams (D)	Jasper Babcock (R)	Michael A. Murphy (R)	Lyman L. Crockett (R)	James F. Hallock (R)	14R, 10D, 1Cit	44D, 6R	James G. Fair (D)	John P. Jones (R)	George W. Cassidy (D)	Hancock/ English (D) ✗
1883	Jewett W. Adams (D)	Charles E. Laughton (R)	John M. Dormer (R)	William H. Davenport (R)	George Tufly (R)	James F. Hallock (R)	12D, 8R	29R, 11D	James G. Fair (D)	John P. Jones (R)	George W. Cassidy (D)	Hancock/ English (D) ✗
1884	Jewett W. Adams (D)	Charles E. Laughton (R)	John M. Dormer (R)	William H. Davenport (R)	George Tufly (R)	James F. Hallock (R)	12D, 8R	29R, 11D	James G. Fair (D)	John P. Jones (R)	George W. Cassidy (D)	Blaine/ Logan (R) ✗
1885	Jewett W. Adams (D)	Charles E. Laughton (R)	John M. Dormer (R)	William H. Davenport (R)	George Tufly (R)	James F. Hallock (R)	14R, 6D	33R, 7D	James G. Fair (D)	John P. Jones (R)	William Woodburn (R)	Blaine/ Logan (R) ✗
1886	Jewett W. Adams (D)	Charles E. Laughton (R)	John M. Dormer (R)	William H. Davenport (R)	George Tufly (R)	James F. Hallock (R)	14R, 6D	33R, 7D	James G. Fair (D)	John P. Jones (R)	William Woodburn (R)	Blaine/ Logan (R) ✗
1887	Charles C. Stevenson (R)	Henry C. Davis (R)	John M. Dormer (R)	John F. Alexander (R)	George Tufly (R)	James F. Hallock (R)	14R, 6D	32R, 8D	William M. Stewart (R)	John P. Jones (R)	William Woodburn (R)	Blaine/ Logan (R) ✗
1888	Charles C. Stevenson (R)	Henry C. Davis (R)	John M. Dormer (R)	John F. Alexander (R)	George Tufly (R)	James F. Hallock (R)	14R, 6D	32R, 8D	William M. Stewart (R)	John P. Jones (R)	William Woodburn (R)	Harrison/ Morton (R) ✓
1889	Charles C. Stevenson (R)	Frank Bell (R)	John M. Dormer (R)	John F. Alexander (R)	George Tufly (R)	James F. Hallock (R)	16R, 4D	26R, 14D	William M. Stewart (R)	John P. Jones (R)	Horace F. Bartine (R)	Harrison/ Morton (R) ✓
1890	Frank Bell (R) (Note: As lieutenant governor, acted as governor for unexpired term.)	vacant	John M. Dormer (R)	John F. Alexander (R)	George W. Richards (R)	James F. Hallock (R)	16R, 4D	26R, 14D	William M. Stewart (R)	John P. Jones (R)	Horace F. Bartine (R)	Harrison/ Morton (R) ✓
1891	Roswell K. Colcord (R)	Joseph Poujade (R)	Oscar H. Grey (R)	James D. Torreyson (R)	John F. Egan (R)	Robert L. Horton (R)	18R, 2D	35R, 5D	William M. Stewart (R)	John P. Jones (R)	Horace F. Bartine (R)	Harrison/ Morton (R) ✓
1892	Roswell K. Colcord (R)	Joseph Poujade (R)	Oscar H. Grey (R)	James D. Torreyson (R)	John F. Egan (R)	Robert L. Horton (R)	18R, 2D	35R, 5D	William M. Stewart (R)	John P. Jones (R)	Horace F. Bartine (R)	Weaver/ Field (Pop) ✗
1893	Roswell K. Colcord (R)	Joseph Poujade (R)	Oscar H. Grey (R)	James D. Torreyson (R)	John F. Egan (R)	Robert L. Horton (R)	9R, 5Sv, 1Pop	15Sv, 7Pop, 5D, 2R, 1I (Note: A Democrat, Thomas J. Bell, was elected Speaker, and the Silverites worked with the Democrats and Populists to organize the chamber.)	William M. Stewart (Sv)	John P. Jones (R)	Francis G. Newlands (Sv)	Weaver/ Field (Pop) ✗
1894	Roswell K. Colcord (R)	Joseph Poujade (R)	Oscar H. Grey (R)	James D. Torreyson (R)	George W. Richards (R)	Robert L. Horton (R)	9R, 5Sv, 1Pop	15Sv, 7Pop, 5D, 2R, 1I	William M. Stewart (Sv)	John P. Jones (R)	Francis G. Newlands (Sv)	Weaver/ Field (Pop) ✗
1895	John Edward Jones (Sv)	Reinhold Sadler (Sv)	Eugene Howell (Sv)	Robert M. Beatty (Sv)	William J. Westerfield (Sv)	C. A. LaGrave (Sv)	5Sv, 5R, 2D, 2I, 1Pop (Note: A Democrat, J.E. Gignoux, was elected President Pro Tempore, and the Senate was organized on a multipartisan basis.)	14Sv, 11R, 3Pop, 2D (Note: A Silverite, Lemuel Allen, was elected Speaker, and the Democrats and Populists sided with the Silverites to organize the chamber.)	William M. Stewart (Sv)	John P. Jones (Sv)	Francis G. Newlands (Sv)	Weaver/ Field (Pop) ✗
1896	Reinhold Sadler (Sv) (Note: As lieutenant governor, acted as governor for unexpired term and was later elected in his own right.)	vacant	Eugene Howell (Sv)	Robert M. Beatty (Sv)	William J. Westerfield (Sv)	C. A. LaGrave (Sv)	5Sv, 5R, 2D, 2I, 1Pop	14Sv, 11R, 3Pop, 2D	William M. Stewart (Sv)	John P. Jones (Sv)	Francis G. Newlands (Sv)	Bryan/ Sewall (D/Pop) ✗
1897	Reinhold Sadler (Sv)	vacant	Eugene Howell (Sv)	James R. Judge (Sv)	William J. Westerfield (Sv)	C. A. LaGrave (Sv)	7Sv, 5R, 1D, 1I, 1Pop (Note: A Republican, A.J. McCone, was elected President Pro Tempore, and the Senate was organized on a multi-partisan basis.)	20Sv, 4D, 3Pop, 2R, 1I	William M. Stewart (Sv)	John P. Jones (Sv)	Francis G. Newlands (Sv)	Bryan/ Sewall (D/Pop) ✗
1898	Reinhold Sadler (Sv)	vacant	Eugene Howell (Sv)	James R. Judge (Sv)	William J. Westerfield (Sv)	C. A. LaGrave (Sv)	7Sv, 5R, 1D, 1I, 1Pop	20Sv, 4D, 3Pop, 2R, 1I	William M. Stewart (Sv)	John P. Jones (Sv)	Francis G. Newlands (Sv)	Bryan/ Sewall (D/Pop) ✗
1899	Reinhold Sadler (Sv)	James R. Judge (Sv)	Eugene Howell (Sv)	William D. Jones (Sv) (Note: Resigned.)	David M. Ryan (Sv/D)	Sam P. Davis (Sv/D)	8Sv, 5R, 1D, 1I	18Sv, 10R, 1D, 1I	William M. Stewart (Sv)	John P. Jones (Sv)	Francis G. Newlands (Sv)	Bryan/ Sewall (D/Pop) ✗
1900	Reinhold Sadler (Sv)	James R. Judge (Sv)	Eugene Howell (Sv)	William D. Jones (Sv)	David M. Ryan (Sv/D)	Sam P. Davis (Sv/D)	8Sv, 5R, 1D, 1I	18Sv, 10R, 1D, 1I	William M. Stewart (Sv)	John P. Jones (Sv)	Francis G. Newlands (Sv)	Bryan/ Stevenson (D) ✗
1901	Reinhold Sadler (Sv)	James R. Judge (Sv)	Eugene Howell (Sv)	William Woodburn (Sv)	David M. Ryan (Sv/D)	Sam P. Davis (Sv/D)	9Sv, 3R, 2I, 1D	13D, 12Sv, 5R, 1I (Note: A Democrat, Clarence D. Van Duzer, was elected Speaker, and the Silverites sided with the Democrats to organize the chamber.)	William M. Stewart (R)	John P. Jones (R)	Francis G. Newlands (Sv)	Bryan/ Stevenson (D) ✗
1902	Reinhold Sadler (Sv)	James R. Judge (Sv)	Eugene Howell (Sv)	William Woodburn (Sv)	David M. Ryan (Sv/D)	Sam P. Davis (Sv/D)	9Sv, 3R, 2I, 1D	13D, 12Sv, 5R, 1I	William M. Stewart (R)	John P. Jones (R)	Francis G. Newlands (Sv)	Bryan/ Stevenson (D) ✗
1903	John Sparks (Sv/D)	Lemuel Allen (Sv/D)	William "Gib" Douglass (R)	James G. Sweeney (Sv/D)	David M. Ryan (Sv/D)	Sam P. Davis (Sv/D)	7Sv, 5R, 3D, 2I (Note: A Silverite, Charles Green, was elected President Pro Tempore with Democratic support, and they both organized the chamber.)	13D, 12Sv, 5R, 2Fus, 2I-Sv (Note: A Democrat, Marion S. Wilson, was elected Speaker, and the Silverites and Fusionists sided with the Democrats to organize the chamber.)	William M. Stewart (R)	Francis G. Newlands (D)	Clarence D. Van Duzer (D)	Bryan/ Stevenson (D) ✗
1904	John Sparks (Sv/D)	Lemuel Allen (Sv/D)	William "Gib" Douglass (R)	James G. Sweeney (Sv/D)	David M. Ryan (Sv/D)	Sam P. Davis (Sv/D)	7Sv, 5R, 3D, 2I	13D, 12Sv, 5R, 2Fus, 2I-Sv	William M. Stewart (R)	Francis G. Newlands (D)	Clarence D. Van Duzer (D)	Roosevelt/ Fairbanks (R) ✓
1905	John Sparks (Sv/D)	Lemuel Allen (Sv/D)	William "Gib" Douglass (R)	James G. Sweeney (Sv/D)	David M. Ryan (Sv/D)	Sam P. Davis (Sv/D)	7R, 6Sv, 3D, 1I (Note: A Silverite, Joseph A. Miller, was elected President Pro Tempore, and the Silverites and Democrats organized the chamber.)	23R, 14D, 2Sv	George S. Nixon (R)	Francis G. Newlands (D)	Clarence D. Van Duzer (D)	Roosevelt/ Fairbanks (R) ✓
1906	John Sparks (Sv/D)	Lemuel Allen (Sv/D)	William "Gib" Douglass (R)	James G. Sweeney (Sv/D)	David M. Ryan (Sv/D)	Sam P. Davis (Sv/D)	7R, 6Sv, 3D, 1I	23R, 14D, 2Sv	George S. Nixon (R)	Francis G. Newlands (D)	Clarence D. Van Duzer (D)	Roosevelt/ Fairbanks (R) ✓
1907	John Sparks (Sv/D)	Denver S. Dickerson (Sv/D)	William "Gib" Douglass (R)	Richard C. Stoddard (Sv/D)	David M. Ryan (Sv/D)	Jacob Eggers (R)	7R, 7D, 2Sv, 1I (Note: The Independent, J.D. Campbell, was elected President Pro Tempore with Republican and renegade Democratic support, and the Republicans organized the chamber.)	18D, 17R, 5Sv (Note: A Democrat, Robert E. Skaggs, was elected Speaker, and the Silverites sided with the Democrats to organize the chamber.)	George S. Nixon (R)	Francis G. Newlands (D)	George A. Bartlett (D)	Roosevelt/ Fairbanks (R) ✓
1908	Denver S. Dickerson (Sv/D)	vacant	William "Gib" Douglass (R)	Richard C. Stoddard (Sv/D)	David M. Ryan (Sv/D)	Jacob Eggers (R)	7R, 7D, 2Sv, 1I	18D, 17R, 5Sv	George S. Nixon (R)	Francis G. Newlands (D)	George A. Bartlett (D)	Bryan/ Kern (D) ✗
1909	Denver S. Dickerson (Sv/D)	vacant	William "Gib" Douglass (R)	Richard C. Stoddard (Sv/D)	David M. Ryan (Sv/D)	Jacob Eggers (R)	12D, 6R, 1I	34D, 14R	George S. Nixon (R)	Francis G. Newlands (D)	George A. Bartlett (D)	Bryan/ Kern (D) ✗
1910	Denver S. Dickerson (Sv/D)	vacant	William "Gib" Douglass (R)	Richard C. Stoddard (Sv/D)	David M. Ryan (Sv/D)	Jacob Eggers (R)	12D, 6R, 1I	34D, 14R	George S. Nixon (R)	Francis G. Newlands (D)	George A. Bartlett (D)	Bryan/ Kern (D) ✗
1911	Tasker Oddie (R)	Gilbert C. Ross (D)	George Brodigan (D)	Cleveland H. Baker (D)	William McMillan (R)	Jacob Eggers (R)	14D, 6R	25R, 24D	George S. Nixon (R)	Francis G. Newlands (D)	Edwin E. Roberts (R)	Bryan/ Kern (D) ✗
1912	Tasker Oddie (R)	Gilbert C. Ross (D)	George Brodigan (D)	Cleveland H. Baker (D)	William McMillan (R)	Jacob Eggers (R)	14D, 6R	25R, 24D	William A. Massey (R)	Francis G. Newlands (D)	Edwin E. Roberts (R)	Wilson/ Marshall (D) ✓
1913	Tasker Oddie (R)	Gilbert C. Ross (D)	George Brodigan (D)	George B. Thatcher (D)	William McMillan (R)	Jacob Eggers (R)	14D, 6R, 1IR, 1Sv	30D, 18R, 2I, 1IR, 1Prog, 1Sv	Key Pittman (D)	Francis G. Newlands (D)	Edwin E. Roberts (R)	Wilson/ Marshall (D) ✓
1914	Tasker Oddie (R)	Gilbert C. Ross (D)	George Brodigan (D)	George B. Thatcher (D)	William McMillan (R)	Jacob Eggers (R)	14D, 6R, 1IR, 1Sv	30D, 18R, 2I, 1IR, 1Prog, 1Sv	Key Pittman (D)	Francis G. Newlands (D)	Edwin E. Roberts (R)	Wilson/ Marshall (D) ✓
1915	Emmet D. Boyle (D)	Maurice J. Sullivan (D)	George Brodigan (D)	George B. Thatcher (D)	Edward C. Malley (D)	George A. Cole (D)	9R, 9D, 2I, 1IR, 1Sv (Note: A Republican, Fred B. Balzar, was elected President Pro Tempore.)	26R, 23D, 3I, 1Sv (Note: A Republican, Allen G. McBride, was elected Speaker, and the Independents sided with the Republicans to organize the chamber.)	Key Pittman (D)	Francis G. Newlands (D)	Edwin E. Roberts (R)	Wilson/ Marshall (D) ✓
1916	Emmet D. Boyle (D)	Maurice J. Sullivan (D)	George Brodigan (D)	George B. Thatcher (D)	Edward C. Malley (D)	George A. Cole (D)	9R, 9D, 2I, 1IR, 1Sv	26R, 23D, 3I, 1Sv	Key Pittman (D)	Francis G. Newlands (D)	Edwin E. Roberts (R)	Wilson/ Marshall (D) ✓
1917	Emmet D. Boyle (D)	Maurice J. Sullivan (D)	George Brodigan (D)	George B. Thatcher (D)	Edward C. Malley (D)	George A. Cole (D)	9R, 5D, 3I	20D, 14R, 3I	Key Pittman (D)	Francis G. Newlands (D)	Edwin E. Roberts (R)	Wilson/ Marshall (D) ✓
1918	Emmet D. Boyle (D)	Maurice J. Sullivan (D)	George Brodigan (D)	George B. Thatcher (D)	Edward C. Malley (D)	George A. Cole (D)	9R, 5D, 3I	20D, 14R, 3I	Key Pittman (D)	Charles Henderson (D)	Edwin E. Roberts (R)	Wilson/ Marshall (D) ✓
1919	Emmet D. Boyle (D)	Maurice J. Sullivan (D)	George Brodigan (D)	Leonard B. Fowler (D)	Edward C. Malley (D)	George A. Cole (D)	8R, 6D, 2I (Note: A Republican, Nealy H. Chapin, was elected President Pro Tempore.)	16D, 15R, 6I (Note: A Democrat, D. J. Fitzgerald, was elected Speaker, and the Independents sided with the Democrats to organize the chamber.)	Key Pittman (D)	Charles Henderson (D)	Charles R. Evans (D)	Wilson/ Marshall (D) ✓
1920	Emmet D. Boyle (D)	Maurice J. Sullivan (D)	George Brodigan (D)	Leonard B. Fowler (D)	Edward C. Malley (D)	George A. Cole (D)	8R, 6D, 2I	16D, 15R, 6I	Key Pittman (D)	Charles Henderson (D)	Charles R. Evans (D)	Harding/ Coolidge (R) ✓
1921	Emmet D. Boyle (D)	Maurice J. Sullivan (D)	George Brodigan (D)	Leonard B. Fowler (D)	Edward C. Malley (D)	George A. Cole (D)	7D, 6R, 4I (Note: An Independent, E.W. Griffith, was elected President Pro Tempore.)	28R, 7D, 2I	Key Pittman (D)	Tasker Oddie (R)	Samuel S. Arentz (R)	Harding/ Coolidge (R) ✓
1922	Emmet D. Boyle (D)	Maurice J. Sullivan (D)	George Brodigan (D)	Leonard B. Fowler (D)	Edward C. Malley (D)	George A. Cole (D)	7D, 6R, 4I	28R, 7D, 2I	Key Pittman (D)	Tasker Oddie (R)	Samuel S. Arentz (R)	Harding/ Coolidge (R) ✓
1923	James G. Scrugham (D)	Maurice J. Sullivan (D)	William G. Greathouse (D)	Michael A. Diskin (D)	Edward C. Malley (D)	George A. Cole (D)	10R, 5D, 2I	26R, 9D, 2I	Key Pittman (D)	Tasker Oddie (R)	Charles L. Richards (D)	Harding/ Coolidge (R) ✓
1924	James G. Scrugham (D)	Maurice J. Sullivan (D)	William G. Greathouse (D)	Michael A. Diskin (D)	Edward C. Malley (D)	George A. Cole (D)	10R, 5D, 2I	26R, 9D, 2I	Key Pittman (D)	Tasker Oddie (R)	Charles L. Richards (D)	Coolidge/ Dawes (R) ✓
1925	James G. Scrugham (D)	Maurice J. Sullivan (D)	William G. Greathouse (D)	Michael A. Diskin (D)	Edward C. Malley (D)	George A. Cole (D)	9R, 8D	23R, 13D, 1I	Key Pittman (D)	Tasker Oddie (R)	Samuel S. Arentz (R)	Coolidge/ Dawes (R) ✓
1926	James G. Scrugham (D)	Maurice J. Sullivan (D)	William G. Greathouse (D)	Michael A. Diskin (D)	Edward C. Malley (D)	George A. Cole (D)	9R, 8D	23R, 13D, 1I	Key Pittman (D)	Tasker Oddie (R)	Samuel S. Arentz (R)	Coolidge/ Dawes (R) ✓
1927	Fred B. Balzar (R)	Morley Griswold (R)	William G. Greathouse (D)	Michael A. Diskin (D)	George B. Russell (R)	Edward C. Peterson (R)	8R, 8D, 1I (Note: A Republican, Noble H. Getchell, was elected President Pro Tempore, and the Independent sided with the Republicans to organize the chamber.)	17R, 17D, 3I (Note: An Independent, Douglas H. Tandy, was elected Speaker.)	Key Pittman (D)	Tasker Oddie (R)	Samuel S. Arentz (R)	Coolidge/ Dawes (R) ✓
1928	Fred B. Balzar (R)	Morley Griswold (R)	William G. Greathouse (D)	Michael A. Diskin (D)	George B. Russell (R)	Edward C. Peterson (R)	8R, 8D, 1I	17R, 17D, 3I	Key Pittman (D)	Tasker Oddie (R)	Samuel S. Arentz (R)	Hoover/ Curtis (R) ✓
1929	Fred B. Balzar (R)	Morley Griswold (R)	William G. Greathouse (D)	Michael A. Diskin (D)	George B. Russell (R)	Edward C. Peterson (R)	12R, 4D, 1I	21R, 14D, 2I	Key Pittman (D)	Tasker Oddie (R)	Samuel S. Arentz (R)	Hoover/ Curtis (R) ✓
1930	Fred B. Balzar (R)	Morley Griswold (R)	William G. Greathouse (D)	Michael A. Diskin (D)	George B. Russell (R)	Edward C. Peterson (R)	12R, 4D, 1I	21R, 14D, 2I	Key Pittman (D)	Tasker Oddie (R)	Samuel S. Arentz (R)	Hoover/ Curtis (R) ✓
1931	Fred B. Balzar (R)	Morley Griswold (R)	William G. Greathouse (D)	Gray Mashburn (D)	George B. Russell (R)	Edward C. Peterson (R)	13R, 4D	19D, 16R, 2I (Note: Elected a minority party speaker, Douglas H. Tandy, who was an independent.)	Key Pittman (D)	Tasker Oddie (R)	Samuel S. Arentz (R)	Hoover/ Curtis (R) ✓
1932	Fred B. Balzar (R)	Morley Griswold (R)	William G. Greathouse (D)	Gray Mashburn (D)	George B. Russell (R)	Edward C. Peterson (R)	13R, 4D	19D, 16R, 2I	Key Pittman (D)	Tasker Oddie (R)	Samuel S. Arentz (R)	Roosevelt/ Garner (D) ✓
1933	Fred B. Balzar (R)	Morley Griswold (R)	William G. Greathouse (D)	Gray Mashburn (D)	George B. Russell (R)	Edward C. Peterson (R)	9R, 7D, 1I	25D, 12R, 3I	Key Pittman (D)	Pat McCarran (D)	James G. Scrugham (D)	Roosevelt/ Garner (D) ✓
1934	Morley Griswold (R)	vacant	William G. Greathouse (D)	Gray Mashburn (D)	George B. Russell (R)	Edward C. Peterson (R)	9R, 7D, 1I	25D, 12R, 3I	Key Pittman (D)	Pat McCarran (D)	James G. Scrugham (D)	Roosevelt/ Garner (D) ✓
1935	Richard Kirman Sr. (D)	Fred S. Alward (D)	William G. Greathouse (D)	Gray Mashburn (D)	Dan W. Franks (D)	Henry C. Schmidt (D)	10D, 5R, 2I	29D, 9R, 2I	Key Pittman (D)	Pat McCarran (D)	James G. Scrugham (D)	Roosevelt/ Garner (D) ✓
1936	Richard Kirman Sr. (D)	Fred S. Alward (D)	William G. Greathouse (D)	Gray Mashburn (D)	Dan W. Franks (D)	Henry C. Schmidt (D)	10D, 5R, 2I	29D, 9R, 2I	Key Pittman (D)	Pat McCarran (D)	James G. Scrugham (D)	Roosevelt/ Garner (D) ✓
1937	Richard Kirman Sr. (D)	Fred S. Alward (D)	Malcolm McEachin (D)	Gray Mashburn (D)	Dan W. Franks (D)	Henry C. Schmidt (D)	11D, 3R, 3I	30D, 10R	Key Pittman (D)	Pat McCarran (D)	James G. Scrugham (D)	Roosevelt/ Garner (D) ✓
1938	Richard Kirman Sr. (D)	Fred S. Alward (D)	Malcolm McEachin (D)	Gray Mashburn (D)	Dan W. Franks (D)	Henry C. Schmidt (D)	11D, 3R, 3I	30D, 10R	Key Pittman (D)	Pat McCarran (D)	James G. Scrugham (D)	Roosevelt/ Garner (D) ✓
1939	Edward P. Carville (D) (Note: Resigned to take an appointed seat in the United States Senate.)	Maurice J. Sullivan (D)	Malcolm McEachin (D)	Gray Mashburn (D)	Dan W. Franks (D)	Henry C. Schmidt (D)	7D, 7R, 3I (Note: A Democrat, John E. Robbins, was elected President Pro Tempore, and the Independents sided with the Democrats to organize the chamber.)	27D, 11R, 2I	Key Pittman (D)	Pat McCarran (D)	James G. Scrugham (D)	Roosevelt/ Garner (D) ✓
1940	Edward P. Carville (D)	Maurice J. Sullivan (D)	Malcolm McEachin (D)	Gray Mashburn (D)	Dan W. Franks (D)	Henry C. Schmidt (D)	7D, 7R, 3I	27D, 11R, 2I	Key Pittman (D)	Pat McCarran (D)	James G. Scrugham (D)	Roosevelt/ Wallace (D) ✓
1941	Edward P. Carville (D)	Maurice J. Sullivan (D)	Malcolm McEachin (D)	Gray Mashburn (D)	Dan W. Franks (D)	Henry C. Schmidt (D)	10R, 6D, 1I	26D, 13R, 1I	Berkeley L. Bunker (D)	Pat McCarran (D)	James G. Scrugham (D)	Roosevelt/ Wallace (D) ✓
1942	Edward P. Carville (D)	Maurice J. Sullivan (D)	Malcolm McEachin (D)	Gray Mashburn (D)	Dan W. Franks (D)	Henry C. Schmidt (D)	10R, 6D, 1I	26D, 13R, 1I	Berkeley L. Bunker (D)	Pat McCarran (D)	James G. Scrugham (D)	Roosevelt/ Wallace (D) ✓
1943	Edward P. Carville (D)	Vail Pittman (D)	Malcolm McEachin (D)	Alan Bible (D)	Dan W. Franks (D)	Henry C. Schmidt (D)	10R, 7D	23D, 17R	James G. Scrugham (D)	Pat McCarran (D)	Maurice J. Sullivan (D)	Roosevelt/ Wallace (D) ✓
1944	Edward P. Carville (D)	Vail Pittman (D)	Malcolm McEachin (D)	Alan Bible (D)	Dan W. Franks (D)	Henry C. Schmidt (D)	10R, 7D	23D, 17R	James G. Scrugham (D)	Pat McCarran (D)	Maurice J. Sullivan (D)	Roosevelt/ Truman (D) ✓
1945	Vail Pittman (D)	Clifford A. Jones (D)	Malcolm McEachin (D)	Alan Bible (D)	Dan W. Franks (D)	Henry C. Schmidt (D)	9R, 8D	27D, 13R	Edward P. Carville (D)	Pat McCarran (D)	Berkeley L. Bunker (D)	Roosevelt/ Truman (D) ✓
1946	Vail Pittman (D)	Clifford A. Jones (D)	Malcolm McEachin (D)	Alan Bible (D)	Dan W. Franks (D)	Henry C. Schmidt (D)	9R, 8D	27D, 13R	Edward P. Carville (D)	Pat McCarran (D)	Berkeley L. Bunker (D)	Roosevelt/ Truman (D) ✓
1947	Vail Pittman (D)	Clifford A. Jones (D)	John Koontz (D)	Alan Bible (D)	Dan W. Franks (D)	Jerome P. Donovan (D)	10R, 7D	22D, 18R, 1I	George W. Malone (R)	Pat McCarran (D)	Charles H. Russell (R)	Roosevelt/ Truman (D) ✓
1948	Vail Pittman (D)	Clifford A. Jones (D)	John Koontz (D)	Alan Bible (D)	Dan W. Franks (D)	Jerome P. Donovan (D)	10R, 7D	22D, 18R, 1I	George W. Malone (R)	Pat McCarran (D)	Charles H. Russell (R)	Truman/ Barkley (D) ✓
1949	Vail Pittman (D)	Clifford A. Jones (D)	John Koontz (D)	Alan Bible (D)	Dan W. Franks (D)	Jerome P. Donovan (D)	11R, 6D	25D, 18R	George W. Malone (R)	Pat McCarran (D)	Walter S. Baring Jr. (D)	Truman/ Barkley (D) ✓
1950	Vail Pittman (D)	Clifford A. Jones (D)	John Koontz (D)	Alan Bible (D)	Dan W. Franks (D)	Jerome P. Donovan (D)	11R, 6D	25D, 18R	George W. Malone (R)	Pat McCarran (D)	Walter S. Baring Jr. (D)	Truman/ Barkley (D) ✓
1951	Charles H. Russell (R)	Clifford A. Jones (D)	John Koontz (D)	William T. Mathews (D)	Dan W. Franks (D)	Peter Merialdo (R)	11R, 6D	23D, 20R	George W. Malone (R)	Pat McCarran (D)	Walter S. Baring Jr. (D)	Truman/ Barkley (D) ✓
1952	Charles H. Russell (R)	Clifford A. Jones (D)	John Koontz (D)	William T. Mathews (D)	Dan W. Franks (D)	Peter Merialdo (R)	11R, 6D	23D, 20R	George W. Malone (R)	Pat McCarran (D)	Walter S. Baring Jr. (D)	Eisenhower/ Nixon (R) ✓
1953	Charles H. Russell (R)	Clifford A. Jones (D)	John Koontz (D)	William T. Mathews (D)	Dan W. Franks (D)	Peter Merialdo (R)	12R, 5D	29D, 18R	George W. Malone (R)	Pat McCarran (D)	Clarence Clifton Young (R)	Eisenhower/ Nixon (R) ✓
1954	Charles H. Russell (R)	Clifford A. Jones (D)	John Koontz (D)	William T. Mathews (D)	Dan W. Franks (D)	Peter Merialdo (R)	12R, 5D	29D, 18R	George W. Malone (R)	Ernest S. Brown (R)	Clarence Clifton Young (R)	Eisenhower/ Nixon (R) ✓
1955	Charles H. Russell (R)	Rex Bell (R)	John Koontz (D)	Harvey Dickerson (D)	Dan W. Franks (D)	Peter Merialdo (R)	13R, 4D	30D, 17R	George W. Malone (R)	Alan Bible (D)	Clarence Clifton Young (R)	Eisenhower/ Nixon (R) ✓
1956	Charles H. Russell (R)	Rex Bell (R)	John Koontz (D)	Harvey Dickerson (D)	Dan W. Franks (D)	Peter Merialdo (R)	13R, 4D	30D, 17R	George W. Malone (R)	Alan Bible (D)	Clarence Clifton Young (R)	Eisenhower/ Nixon (R) ✓
1957	Charles H. Russell (R)	Rex Bell (R)	John Koontz (D)	Harvey Dickerson (D)	Dan W. Franks (D)	Peter Merialdo (R)	12R, 5D	31D, 16R	George W. Malone (R)	Alan Bible (D)	Walter S. Baring Jr. (D)	Eisenhower/ Nixon (R) ✓
1958	Charles H. Russell (R)	Rex Bell (R)	John Koontz (D)	Harvey Dickerson (D)	Dan W. Franks (D)	Peter Merialdo (R)	12R, 5D	31D, 16R	George W. Malone (R)	Alan Bible (D)	Walter S. Baring Jr. (D)	Eisenhower/ Nixon (R) ✓
1959	Grant Sawyer (D)	Rex Bell (R)	John Koontz (D)	Roger D. Foley (D) (Note: Resigned to accepted federal judgeship.)	Dan W. Franks (D)	Keith L. Lee (D)	10R, 7D	33D, 14R	Howard Cannon (D)	Alan Bible (D)	Walter S. Baring Jr. (D)	Eisenhower/ Nixon (R) ✓
1960	Grant Sawyer (D)	Rex Bell (R)	John Koontz (D)	Roger D. Foley (D)	Dan W. Franks (D)	Keith L. Lee (D)	10R, 7D	33D, 14R	Howard Cannon (D)	Alan Bible (D)	Walter S. Baring Jr. (D)	Kennedy/ Johnson (D) ✓
1961	Grant Sawyer (D)	Rex Bell (R)	John Koontz (D)	Roger D. Foley (D)	Dan W. Franks (D)	Keith L. Lee (D)	10R, 7D	33D, 14R	Howard Cannon (D)	Alan Bible (D)	Walter S. Baring Jr. (D)	Kennedy/ Johnson (D) ✓
1962	Grant Sawyer (D)	Maude Frazier (D)	John Koontz (D)	Charles E. Springer (D)	Dan W. Franks (D)	Keith L. Lee (D)	10R, 7D	33D, 14R	Howard Cannon (D)	Alan Bible (D)	Walter S. Baring Jr. (D)	Kennedy/ Johnson (D) ✓
1963	Grant Sawyer (D)	Paul Laxalt (R)	John Koontz (D)	Harvey Dickerson (D)	Michael Mirabelli (D)	Keith L. Lee (D)	10R, 7D	32D, 15R	Howard Cannon (D)	Alan Bible (D)	Walter S. Baring Jr. (D)	Kennedy/ Johnson (D) ✓
1964	Grant Sawyer (D)	Paul Laxalt (R)	John Koontz (D)	Harvey Dickerson (D)	Michael Mirabelli (D)	Keith L. Lee (D)	10R, 7D	32D, 15R	Howard Cannon (D)	Alan Bible (D)	Walter S. Baring Jr. (D)	Johnson/ Humphrey (D) ✓
1965	Grant Sawyer (D)	Paul Laxalt (R)	John Koontz (D)	Harvey Dickerson (D)	Michael Mirabelli (D)	Keith L. Lee (D)	9R, 7D, 1I	25D, 12R	Howard Cannon (D)	Alan Bible (D)	Walter S. Baring Jr. (D)	Johnson/ Humphrey (D) ✓
1966	Grant Sawyer (D)	Paul Laxalt (R)	John Koontz (D)	Harvey Dickerson (D)	Michael Mirabelli (D)	Keith L. Lee (D)	9R, 7D, 1I	25D, 12R	Howard Cannon (D)	Alan Bible (D)	Walter S. Baring Jr. (D)	Johnson/ Humphrey (D) ✓
1967	Paul Laxalt (R)	Edward Fike (R)	John Koontz (D)	Harvey Dickerson (D)	Michael Mirabelli (D)	Wilson McGowan (R)	11D, 9R	21D, 19R	Howard Cannon (D)	Alan Bible (D)	Walter S. Baring Jr. (D)	Johnson/ Humphrey (D) ✓
1968	Paul Laxalt (R)	Edward Fike (R)	John Koontz (D)	Harvey Dickerson (D)	Michael Mirabelli (D)	Wilson McGowan (R)	11D, 9R	21D, 19R	Howard Cannon (D)	Alan Bible (D)	Walter S. Baring Jr. (D)	Nixon/ Agnew (R) ✓
1969	Paul Laxalt (R)	Edward Fike (R)	John Koontz (D)	Harvey Dickerson (D)	Michael Mirabelli (D)	Wilson McGowan (R)	11D, 9R	22R, 18D	Howard Cannon (D)	Alan Bible (D)	Walter S. Baring Jr. (D)	Nixon/ Agnew (R) ✓
1970	Paul Laxalt (R)	Edward Fike (R)	John Koontz (D)	Harvey Dickerson (D)	Michael Mirabelli (D)	Wilson McGowan (R)	11D, 9R	22R, 18D	Howard Cannon (D)	Alan Bible (D)	Walter S. Baring Jr. (D)	Nixon/ Agnew (R) ✓
1971	Mike O'Callaghan (D)	Harry Reid (D)	John Koontz (D)	Robert List (R)	Michael Mirabelli (D)	Wilson McGowan (R)	13D, 7R	21R, 19D	Howard Cannon (D)	Alan Bible (D)	Walter S. Baring Jr. (D)	Nixon/ Agnew (R) ✓
1972	Mike O'Callaghan (D)	Harry Reid (D)	John Koontz (D)	Robert List (R)	Michael Mirabelli (D)	Wilson McGowan (R)	13D, 7R	21R, 19D	Howard Cannon (D)	Alan Bible (D)	Walter S. Baring Jr. (D)	Nixon/ Agnew (R) ✓
1973	Mike O'Callaghan (D)	Harry Reid (D)	William D. Swackhamer (D)	Robert List (R)	Michael Mirabelli (D)	Wilson McGowan (R)	14D, 6R	25D, 15R	Howard Cannon (D)	Alan Bible (D)	David Towell (R)	Nixon/ Agnew (R) ✓
1974	Mike O'Callaghan (D)	Harry Reid (D)	William D. Swackhamer (D)	Robert List (R)	Michael Mirabelli (D)	Wilson McGowan (R)	14D, 6R	25D, 15R	Howard Cannon (D)	Alan Bible (D)	David Towell (R)	Nixon/ Agnew (R) ✓
1975	Mike O'Callaghan (D)	Robert E. Rose (D)	William D. Swackhamer (D)	Robert List (R)	Michael Mirabelli (D)	Wilson McGowan (R)	17D, 3R	31D, 9R	Howard Cannon (D)	Paul Laxalt (R)	James David Santini (D)	Nixon/ Agnew (R) ✓
1976	Mike O'Callaghan (D)	Robert E. Rose (D)	William D. Swackhamer (D)	Robert List (R)	Michael Mirabelli (D)	Wilson McGowan (R)	17D, 3R	31D, 9R	Howard Cannon (D)	Paul Laxalt (R)	James David Santini (D)	Ford/ Dole (R) ✗
1977	Mike O'Callaghan (D)	Robert E. Rose (D)	William D. Swackhamer (D)	Robert List (R)	Michael Mirabelli (D)	Wilson McGowan (R)	17D, 3R	35D, 5R	Howard Cannon (D)	Paul Laxalt (R)	James David Santini (D)	Ford/ Dole (R) ✗
1978	Mike O'Callaghan (D)	Robert E. Rose (D)	William D. Swackhamer (D)	Robert List (R)	Michael Mirabelli (D)	Wilson McGowan (R)	17D, 3R	35D, 5R	Howard Cannon (D)	Paul Laxalt (R)	James David Santini (D)	Ford/ Dole (R) ✗
1979	Robert List (R)	Myron E. Leavitt (D)	William D. Swackhamer (D)	Richard Bryan (D)	Stanton Colton (D)	Wilson McGowan (R)	15D, 5R	26D, 14R	Howard Cannon (D)	Paul Laxalt (R)	James David Santini (D)	Ford/ Dole (R) ✗
1980	Robert List (R)	Myron E. Leavitt (D)	William D. Swackhamer (D)	Richard Bryan (D)	Stanton Colton (D)	Wilson McGowan (R)	15D, 5R	26D, 14R	Howard Cannon (D)	Paul Laxalt (R)	James David Santini (D)	Reagan/ Bush (R) ✓
1981	Robert List (R)	Myron E. Leavitt (D)	William D. Swackhamer (D)	Richard Bryan (D)	Stanton Colton (D)	Wilson McGowan (R)	15D, 5R	26D, 14R	Howard Cannon (D)	Paul Laxalt (R)	James David Santini (D)	Reagan/ Bush (R) ✓
1982	Robert List (R)	Myron E. Leavitt (D)	William D. Swackhamer (D)	Richard Bryan (D)	Stanton Colton (D)	Wilson McGowan (R)	15D, 5R	26D, 14R	Howard Cannon (D)	Paul Laxalt (R)	James David Santini (D)	Reagan/ Bush (R) ✓

== 1983–present ==
Year	Executive offices						State Legislature		United States Congress			Electoral votes
Year	Governor	Lt. Governor	Secretary of State	Attorney General	Treasurer	Controller	Senate	Assembly	Senator (Class I)	Senator (Class III)	House	Electoral votes
1983	Richard Bryan (D)	Bob Cashell (R)	William D. Swackhamer (D)	Brian McKay (R)	Patricia Cafferata (R)	Darrel R. Daines (R)	17D, 4R	22D, 20R	Chic Hecht (R)	Paul Laxalt (R)	1D, 1R	Reagan/ Bush (R) ✓
1984	Richard Bryan (D)	Bob Cashell (R)	William D. Swackhamer (D)	Brian McKay (R)	Patricia Cafferata (R)	Darrel R. Daines (R)	17D, 4R	22D, 20R	Chic Hecht (R)	Paul Laxalt (R)	1D, 1R	Reagan/ Bush (R) ✓
1985	Richard Bryan (D)	Bob Cashell (R)	William D. Swackhamer (D)	Brian McKay (R)	Patricia Cafferata (R)	Darrel R. Daines (R)	13D, 8R	25R, 17D	Chic Hecht (R)	Paul Laxalt (R)	1D, 1R	Reagan/ Bush (R) ✓
1986	Richard Bryan (D)	Bob Cashell (R)	William D. Swackhamer (D)	Brian McKay (R)	Patricia Cafferata (R)	Darrel R. Daines (R)	13D, 8R	25R, 17D	Chic Hecht (R)	Paul Laxalt (R)	1D, 1R	Reagan/ Bush (R) ✓
1987	Richard Bryan (D)	Bob Miller (D)	Frankie Sue Del Papa (D)	Brian McKay (R)	Kenneth F. Santor (R)	Darrel R. Daines (R)	12R, 9D	29D, 13R	Chic Hecht (R)	Harry Reid (D)	1D, 1R	Reagan/ Bush (R) ✓
1988	Richard Bryan (D)	Bob Miller (D)	Frankie Sue Del Papa (D)	Brian McKay (R)	Kenneth F. Santor (R)	Darrel R. Daines (R)	12R, 9D	29D, 13R	Chic Hecht (R)	Harry Reid (D)	1D, 1R	Bush/ Quayle (R) ✓
1989	Bob Miller (D)	vacant	Frankie Sue Del Papa (D)	Brian McKay (R)	Kenneth F. Santor (R)	Darrel R. Daines (R)	13R, 8D	32D, 10R	Richard Bryan (D)	Harry Reid (D)	1D, 1R	Bush/ Quayle (R) ✓
1990	Bob Miller (D)	vacant	Frankie Sue Del Papa (D)	Brian McKay (R)	Kenneth F. Santor (R)	Darrel R. Daines (R)	13R, 8D	32D, 10R	Richard Bryan (D)	Harry Reid (D)	1D, 1R	Bush/ Quayle (R) ✓
1991	Bob Miller (D)	Sue Wagner (R)	Cheryl Lau (R)	Frankie Sue Del Papa (D)	Bob Seale (R)	Darrel R. Daines (R)	11D, 10R	22D, 20R	Richard Bryan (D)	Harry Reid (D)	1D, 1R	Bush/ Quayle (R) ✓
1992	Bob Miller (D)	Sue Wagner (R)	Cheryl Lau (R)	Frankie Sue Del Papa (D)	Bob Seale (R)	Darrel R. Daines (R)	11D, 10R	22D, 20R	Richard Bryan (D)	Harry Reid (D)	1D, 1R	Clinton/ Gore (D) ✓
1993	Bob Miller (D)	Sue Wagner (R)	Cheryl Lau (R)	Frankie Sue Del Papa (D)	Bob Seale (R)	Darrel R. Daines (R)	11R, 10D	29D, 13R	Richard Bryan (D)	Harry Reid (D)	1D, 1R	Clinton/ Gore (D) ✓
1994	Bob Miller (D)	Sue Wagner (R)	Cheryl Lau (R)	Frankie Sue Del Papa (D)	Bob Seale (R)	Darrel R. Daines (R)	11R, 10D	29D, 13R	Richard Bryan (D)	Harry Reid (D)	1D, 1R	Clinton/ Gore (D) ✓
1995	Bob Miller (D)	Lonnie Hammargren (R)	Dean Heller (R)	Frankie Sue Del Papa (D)	Bob Seale (R)	Darrel R. Daines (R)	13R, 8D	21R, 21D (Note: Due to a split chamber, the Democrats and Republicans negotiated a power-sharing agreement to split committees, and the House elected co-Speakers from both parties.)	Richard Bryan (D)	Harry Reid (D)	2R	Clinton/ Gore (D) ✓
1996	Bob Miller (D)	Lonnie Hammargren (R)	Dean Heller (R)	Frankie Sue Del Papa (D)	Bob Seale (R)	Darrel R. Daines (R)	13R, 8D	21R, 21D	Richard Bryan (D)	Harry Reid (D)	2R	Clinton/ Gore (D) ✓
1997	Bob Miller (D)	Lonnie Hammargren (R)	Dean Heller (R)	Frankie Sue Del Papa (D)	Bob Seale (R)	Darrel R. Daines (R)	12R, 9D	25D, 17R	Richard Bryan (D)	Harry Reid (D)	2R	Clinton/ Gore (D) ✓
1998	Bob Miller (D)	Lonnie Hammargren (R)	Dean Heller (R)	Frankie Sue Del Papa (D)	Bob Seale (R)	Darrel R. Daines (R)	12R, 9D	25D, 17R	Richard Bryan (D)	Harry Reid (D)	2R	Clinton/ Gore (D) ✓
1999	Kenny Guinn (R)	Lorraine Hunt (R)	Dean Heller (R)	Frankie Sue Del Papa (D)	Brian Krolicki (R)	Kathy Augustine (R)	12R, 9D	28D, 14R	Richard Bryan (D)	Harry Reid (D)	1R, 1D	Clinton/ Gore (D) ✓
2000	Kenny Guinn (R)	Lorraine Hunt (R)	Dean Heller (R)	Frankie Sue Del Papa (D)	Brian Krolicki (R)	Kathy Augustine (R)	12R, 9D	28D, 14R	Richard Bryan (D)	Harry Reid (D)	1R, 1D	Bush/ Cheney (R) ✓
2001	Kenny Guinn (R)	Lorraine Hunt (R)	Dean Heller (R)	Frankie Sue Del Papa (D)	Brian Krolicki (R)	Kathy Augustine (R)	12R, 9D	27D, 15R	John Ensign (R)	Harry Reid (D)	1R, 1D	Bush/ Cheney (R) ✓
2002	Kenny Guinn (R)	Lorraine Hunt (R)	Dean Heller (R)	Frankie Sue Del Papa (D)	Brian Krolicki (R)	Kathy Augustine (R)	12R, 9D	27D, 15R	John Ensign (R)	Harry Reid (D)	1R, 1D	Bush/ Cheney (R) ✓
2003	Kenny Guinn (R)	Lorraine Hunt (R)	Dean Heller (R)	Brian Sandoval (R)	Brian Krolicki (R)	Kathy Augustine (R)	13R, 8D	23D, 19R	John Ensign (R)	Harry Reid (D)	2R, 1D	Bush/ Cheney (R) ✓
2004	Kenny Guinn (R)	Lorraine Hunt (R)	Dean Heller (R)	Brian Sandoval (R)	Brian Krolicki (R)	Kathy Augustine (R)	13R, 8D	23D, 19R	John Ensign (R)	Harry Reid (D)	2R, 1D	Bush/ Cheney (R) ✓
2005	Kenny Guinn (R)	Lorraine Hunt (R)	Dean Heller (R)	Brian Sandoval (R)	Brian Krolicki (R)	Kathy Augustine (R)	12R, 9D	26D, 16R	John Ensign (R)	Harry Reid (D)	2R, 1D	Bush/ Cheney (R) ✓
2005	Kenny Guinn (R)	Lorraine Hunt (R)	Dean Heller (R)	George Chanos (R)	Brian Krolicki (R)	Kathy Augustine (R)	12R, 9D	26D, 16R	John Ensign (R)	Harry Reid (D)	2R, 1D	Bush/ Cheney (R) ✓
2006	Kenny Guinn (R)	Lorraine Hunt (R)	Dean Heller (R)	George Chanos (R)	Brian Krolicki (R)	Steve Martin (R)	12R, 9D	26D, 16R	John Ensign (R)	Harry Reid (D)	2R, 1D	Bush/ Cheney (R) ✓
2007	Jim Gibbons (R)	Brian Krolicki (R)	Ross Miller (D)	Catherine Cortez; Masto (D)	Kate Marshall (D)	Kim Wallin (D)	11R, 10D	27D, 15R	John Ensign (R)	Harry Reid (D)	2R, 1D	Bush/ Cheney (R) ✓
2008	Jim Gibbons (R)	Brian Krolicki (R)	Ross Miller (D)	Catherine Cortez; Masto (D)	Kate Marshall (D)	Kim Wallin (D)	11R, 10D	27D, 15R	John Ensign (R)	Harry Reid (D)	2R, 1D	Obama/ Biden (D) ✓
2009	Jim Gibbons (R)	Brian Krolicki (R)	Ross Miller (D)	Catherine Cortez; Masto (D)	Kate Marshall (D)	Kim Wallin (D)	12D, 9R	28D, 14R	John Ensign (R)	Harry Reid (D)	2D, 1R	Obama/ Biden (D) ✓
2010	Jim Gibbons (R)	Brian Krolicki (R)	Ross Miller (D)	Catherine Cortez; Masto (D)	Kate Marshall (D)	Kim Wallin (D)	12D, 9R	28D, 14R	John Ensign (R)	Harry Reid (D)	2D, 1R	Obama/ Biden (D) ✓
2011	Brian Sandoval (R)	Brian Krolicki (R)	Ross Miller (D)	Catherine Cortez; Masto (D)	Kate Marshall (D)	Kim Wallin (D)	11D, 10R	26D, 16R	Dean Heller (R)	Harry Reid (D)	2R, 1D	Obama/ Biden (D) ✓
2012	Brian Sandoval (R)	Brian Krolicki (R)	Ross Miller (D)	Catherine Cortez; Masto (D)	Kate Marshall (D)	Kim Wallin (D)	11D, 10R	26D, 16R	Dean Heller (R)	Harry Reid (D)	2R, 1D	Obama/ Biden (D) ✓
2013	Brian Sandoval (R)	Brian Krolicki (R)	Ross Miller (D)	Catherine Cortez; Masto (D)	Kate Marshall (D)	Kim Wallin (D)	11D, 10R	27D, 15R	Dean Heller (R)	Harry Reid (D)	2R, 2D	Obama/ Biden (D) ✓
2014	Brian Sandoval (R)	Brian Krolicki (R)	Ross Miller (D)	Catherine Cortez; Masto (D)	Kate Marshall (D)	Kim Wallin (D)	11D, 10R	27D, 15R	Dean Heller (R)	Harry Reid (D)	2R, 2D	Obama/ Biden (D) ✓
2015	Brian Sandoval (R)	Mark Hutchison (R)	Barbara Cegavske (R)	Adam Laxalt (R)	Dan Schwartz (R)	Ron Knecht (R)	11R, 10D	25R, 17D	Dean Heller (R)	Harry Reid (D)	3R, 1D	Obama/ Biden (D) ✓
2016	Brian Sandoval (R)	Mark Hutchison (R)	Barbara Cegavske (R)	Adam Laxalt (R)	Dan Schwartz (R)	Ron Knecht (R)	11R, 10D	24R, 17D, 1L	Dean Heller (R)	Harry Reid (D)	3R, 1D	Clinton/ Kaine (D) ✗
2017	Brian Sandoval (R)	Mark Hutchison (R)	Barbara Cegavske (R)	Adam Laxalt (R)	Dan Schwartz (R)	Ron Knecht (R)	11D, 9R, 1I (Note: A Republican Senator switched parties to Independent and caucused with the Democrats.)	27D, 15R	Dean Heller (R)	Catherine Cortez; Masto (D)	3D, 1R	Clinton/ Kaine (D) ✗
2018	Brian Sandoval (R)	Mark Hutchison (R)	Barbara Cegavske (R)	Adam Laxalt (R)	Dan Schwartz (R)	Ron Knecht (R)	11D, 9R, 1I	27D, 15R	Dean Heller (R)	Catherine Cortez; Masto (D)	3D, 1R	Clinton/ Kaine (D) ✗
2019	Steve Sisolak (D)	Kate Marshall (D) (Note: Resigned September 17, 2021 to join the White House Office of Intergovernmental Affairs.)	Barbara Cegavske (R)	Aaron D. Ford (D)	Zach Conine (D)	Catherine Byrne (D)	13D, 8R	29D, 13R	Jacky Rosen (D)	Catherine Cortez; Masto (D)	3D, 1R	Clinton/ Kaine (D) ✗
2020	Steve Sisolak (D)	Kate Marshall (D)	Barbara Cegavske (R)	Aaron D. Ford (D)	Zach Conine (D)	Catherine Byrne (D)	13D, 8R	29D, 13R	Jacky Rosen (D)	Catherine Cortez; Masto (D)	3D, 1R	Biden/ Harris (D) ✓
2021	Steve Sisolak (D)	Kate Marshall (D)	Barbara Cegavske (R)	Aaron D. Ford (D)	Zach Conine (D)	Catherine Byrne (D)	12D, 9R	26D, 16R	Jacky Rosen (D)	Catherine Cortez; Masto (D)	3D, 1R	Biden/ Harris (D) ✓
2021	Steve Sisolak (D)	vacant	Barbara Cegavske (R)	Aaron D. Ford (D)	Zach Conine (D)	Catherine Byrne (D)	12D, 9R	26D, 16R	Jacky Rosen (D)	Catherine Cortez; Masto (D)	3D, 1R	Biden/ Harris (D) ✓
2022	Steve Sisolak (D)	Lisa Cano Burkhead (D)	Barbara Cegavske (R)	Aaron D. Ford (D)	Zach Conine (D)	Catherine Byrne (D)	12D, 9R	26D, 16R	Jacky Rosen (D)	Catherine Cortez; Masto (D)	3D, 1R	Biden/ Harris (D) ✓
2023	Joe Lombardo (R)	Stavros Anthony (R)	Cisco Aguilar (D)	Aaron D. Ford (D)	Zach Conine (D)	Andy Matthews (R)	13D, 8R	28D, 14R	Jacky Rosen (D)	Catherine Cortez; Masto (D)	3D, 1R	Biden/ Harris (D) ✓
2024	Joe Lombardo (R)	Stavros Anthony (R)	Cisco Aguilar (D)	Aaron D. Ford (D)	Zach Conine (D)	Andy Matthews (R)	13D, 8R	28D, 14R	Jacky Rosen (D)	Catherine Cortez; Masto (D)	3D, 1R	Trump/ Vance (R) ✓
2025	Joe Lombardo (R)	Stavros Anthony (R)	Cisco Aguilar (D)	Aaron D. Ford (D)	Zach Conine (D)	Andy Matthews (R)	13D, 8R	27D, 15R	Jacky Rosen (D)	Catherine Cortez; Masto (D)	3D, 1R	Trump/ Vance (R) ✓
2026	Joe Lombardo (R)	Stavros Anthony (R)	Cisco Aguilar (D)	Aaron D. Ford (D)	Zach Conine (D)	Andy Matthews (R)	13D, 8R	27D, 15R	Jacky Rosen (D)	Catherine Cortez; Masto (D)	3D, 1R	Trump/ Vance (R) ✓
2027	Aaron D. Ford (D)	Sandra Jauregui (D)	Cisco Aguilar (D)	Nicole Cannizzaro (D)	Tya Mathis-Coleman (D)	Michael MacDougall (D)	13D, 8R	32D, 10R	Jacky Rosen (D)	Catherine Cortez; Masto (D)	4D	Trump/ Vance (R) ✓

Key to party colors and abbreviations for members of the U.S. Congress and other politicians or officials
Alaskan Independence (AKIP) Know Nothing (KN) American Labor (AL) Anti-Jacksonian (Anti-J); National Republican (NR) Anti-Administration (AA) Anti-Masonic (Anti-M) Conservative (Con) Covenant (Cov)	Democratic (D) Democratic–Farmer–Labor (DFL) Democratic–NPL (D-NPL) Dixiecrat (Dix), States' Rights (SR) Democratic-Republican (DR) Farmer–Labor (FL) Federalist (F); Pro-Administration (PA)	Free Soil (FS) Fusion (Fus) Greenback (GB) Independence (IPM) Jacksonian (J) Liberal (Lib) Libertarian (L) National Union (NU)	Nonpartisan League (NPL) Nullifier (N) Opposition Northern (O); Opposition Southern (O) Populist (Pop) Progressive (Prog) Prohibition (Proh) Readjuster (Rea)	Republican (R) Silver (Sv) Silver Republican (SvR) Socialist (Soc) Union (U) Unconditional Union (UU) Vermont Progressive (VP) Whig (W)	Independent (I) Nonpartisan (NP)

== See also ==
- Politics in Nevada
- Elections in Nevada
- List of Nevada state legislatures
