= Nevada's congressional delegations =

Map of Nevada's four congressional districts for the United States House of Representatives since 2023.

Nevada has sent congressional delegations to the United States Senate and United States House of Representatives since it became a state in 1864. Before becoming a state, the Nevada Territory elected a non-voting delegate at-large to Congress, beginning with the 37th United States Congress in 1861. Nevada first sent a voting representative to Congress in the 38th United States Congress, following its statehood.

Each U.S. state elects two senators to serve for six years in general elections, with their re-election staggered. Prior to the ratification of the Seventeenth Amendment in 1913, senators were elected by the Nevada Legislature; afterwards, senators were elected directly by the people of the state. (Note: Nevada implemented a referendum that effectively compelled the legislature to vote for the candidate who won the popular vote for the 1908, 1910, and 1912 Senate elections.) As of 2026, Nevada has been represented in the Senate by twenty-seven people, including incumbent Democrats Jacky Rosen and Catherine Cortez Masto.

Each state elects at least one member to the House of Representatives for a two-year term. The number of House members is proportional to the state's share of the national population, and changes every ten years with the results of the United States census. Nevada has had four seats in the House since 2013, following the 2010 United States census. As of 2026, Nevada has been represented in the House by fifty-one people, including incumbent Democrats Dina Titus, Susie Lee, and Steven Horsford, and by Republican Mark Amodei.

== Current delegation ==
Current U.S. senators from Nevada
Nevada CPVI (2025): R+1	Class I senator	Class III senator
Nevada CPVI (2025): R+1	Jacky Rosen (Junior senator) (Henderson)	Catherine Cortez Masto (Senior senator) (Las Vegas)
Party	Democratic	Democratic
Incumbent since	January 3, 2019	January 3, 2017

Nevada's current congressional delegation in the 119th United States Congress consists of two senators, Catherine Cortez Masto and Jacky Rosen, who are both Democrats, and four House members: Democratic representatives Dina Titus, Susie Lee, and Steven Horsford, and Republican representative Mark Amodei. Nevada has had four seats in the House since 2013, following the 2010 United States census. As of 2026, the dean, or longest-serving incumbent, of the Nevada delegation is Representative Mark Amodei, who has represented Nevada in the House of Representatives since 2011.

The Cook Partisan Voting Index (CPVI) is a measure of how strongly partisan a state is. For each district or state, the CPVI measures the party leaning (Democratic or Republican) and the number of percentage points more partisan than the national average. For instance, a rating of R+4 would mean the district or state voted four percentage points more Republican than the national average, while a rating of D+9 would mean the district or state voted nine points more Democratic than the national average. As of 2025, the CPVI rated Nevada's 1st, 3rd, and 4th congressional districts as leaning Democratic, while the 2nd district leans Republican. The CPVI gave Nevada an R+1 rating as a whole.

Current U.S. representatives from Nevada
District	Member (Residence)	Party	Incumbent since	CPVI (2025)	District map
1st	Dina Titus (Las Vegas)	Democratic	January 3, 2013	D+2	
2nd	Mark Amodei (Carson City)	Republican	September 13, 2011	R+7	
3rd	Susie Lee (Las Vegas)	Democratic	January 3, 2019	D+1	
4th	Steven Horsford (Las Vegas)	Democratic	January 3, 2019	D+2	

== United States Senate ==
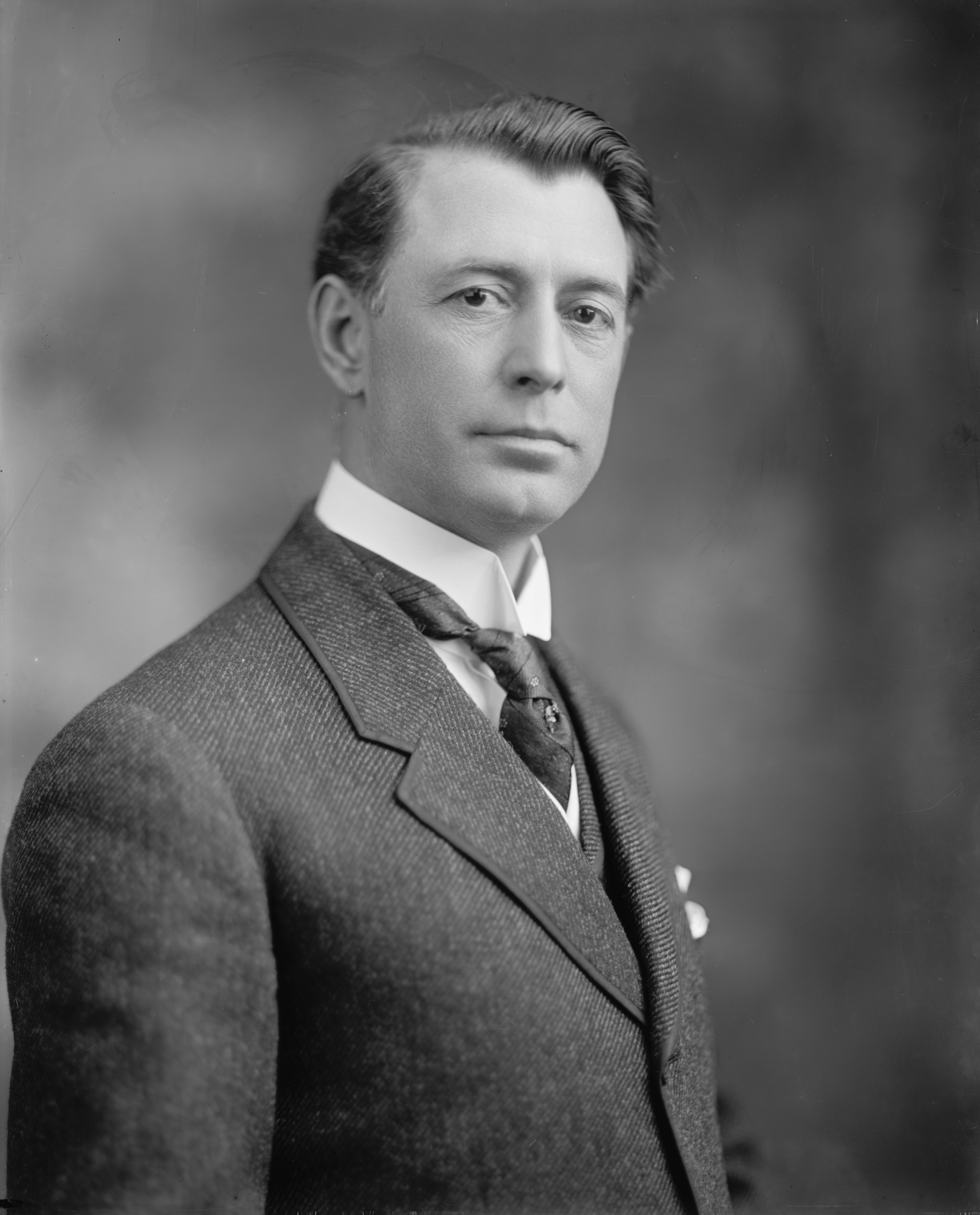
Key Pittman, a senator from Nevada who served as the chairman of the Senate Foreign Relations Committee and as the president pro tempore of the Senate

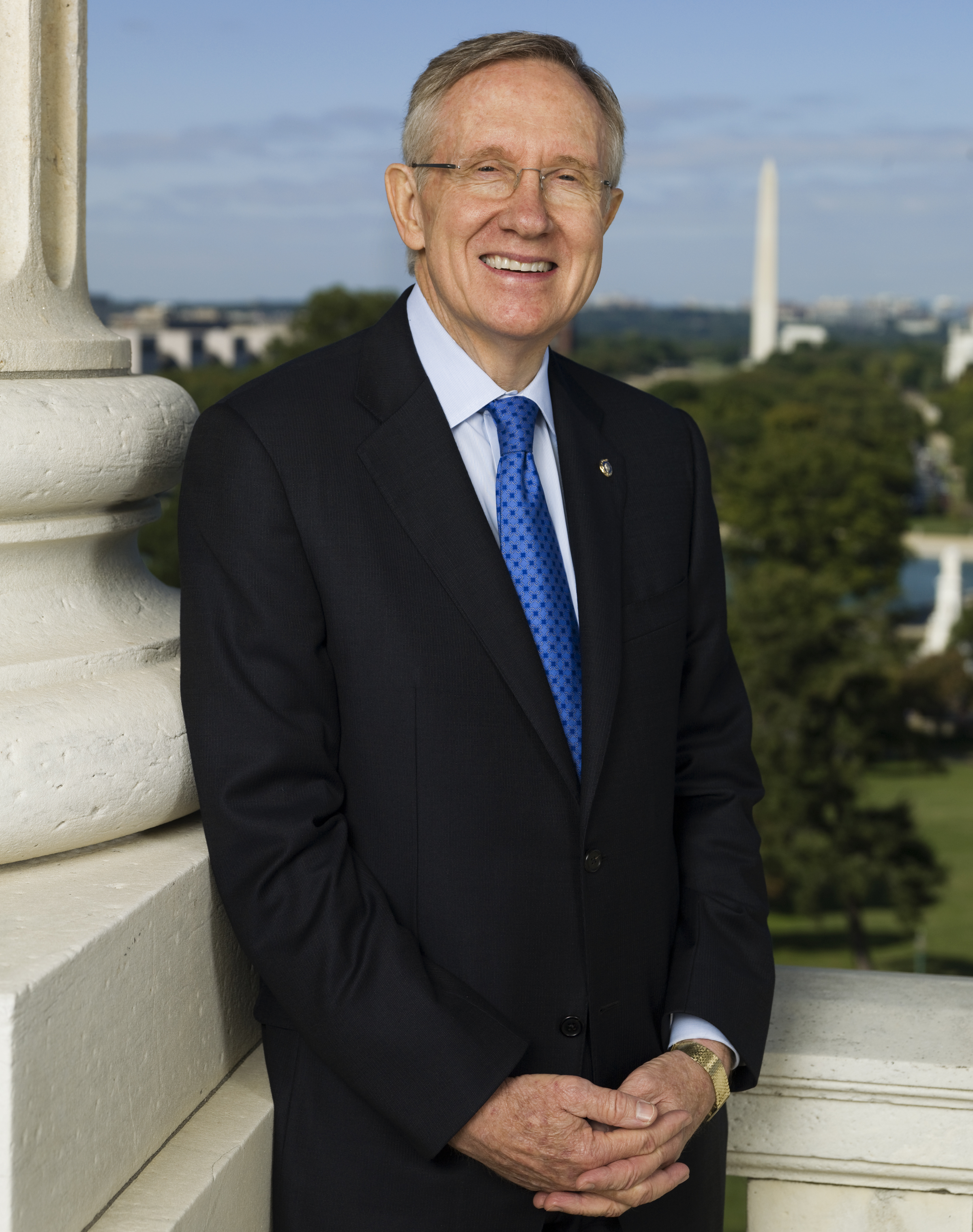
Harry Reid, the longest-serving senator in Nevada history, who served as the Democratic majority leader from 2007 to 2015

Twenty-seven people have represented Nevada in the United States Senate, of which twenty-five have been men and two have been women. The longest-serving senator from Nevada, Harry Reid, served from 1987 to 2017, and was the Senate's Democratic majority leader between 2007 and 2015, overseeing the passage of the American Recovery and Reinvestment Act of 2009 and the Affordable Care Act. Other Nevada senators include Key Pittman, whose 27-year Senate tenure included time as the chairman of the Senate Foreign Relations Committee and as president pro tempore, and Howard Cannon, whose 24-year tenure included time as the chairman of the Senate Commerce, Science, and Transportation Committee.

Senators are elected every six years depending on their class, with each senator serving a six-year term and elections for senators occurring every two years; the class up for re-election rotates such that around one-third of the seats in the Senate are up for election in each cycle. Nevada's senators are elected in classes I and III. As of 2026, Nevada is represented in the Senate by Jacky Rosen and Catherine Cortez Masto, both of whom are Democrats.

Democratic (D)
Republican (R)
Silver (Sv)

Senators from Nevada
Class I senator	Congress	Class III senator
William M. Stewart (R)	38th (1863–1865)	James W. Nye (R)
William M. Stewart (R)	39th (1865–1867)	James W. Nye (R)
William M. Stewart (R)	40th (1867–1869)	James W. Nye (R)
William M. Stewart (R)	41st (1869–1871)	James W. Nye (R)
William M. Stewart (R)	42nd (1871–1873)	James W. Nye (R)
William M. Stewart (R)	43rd (1873–1875)	John P. Jones (R)
William Sharon (R)	44th (1875–1877)	John P. Jones (R)
William Sharon (R)	45th (1877–1879)	John P. Jones (R)
William Sharon (R)	46th (1879–1881)	John P. Jones (R)
James G. Fair (D)	47th (1881–1883)	John P. Jones (R)
James G. Fair (D)	48th (1883–1885)	John P. Jones (R)
James G. Fair (D)	49th (1885–1887)	John P. Jones (R)
William M. Stewart (R)	50th (1887–1889)	John P. Jones (R)
William M. Stewart (R)	51st (1889–1891)	John P. Jones (R)
William M. Stewart (R)	52nd (1891–1893)	John P. Jones (R)
William M. Stewart (Sv)	53rd (1893–1895)	John P. Jones (R)
William M. Stewart (Sv)	54th (1895–1897)	John P. Jones (Sv)
William M. Stewart (Sv)	55th (1897–1899)	John P. Jones (Sv)
William M. Stewart (Sv)	56th (1899–1901)	John P. Jones (Sv)
William M. Stewart (R)	57th (1901–1903)	John P. Jones (R)
William M. Stewart (R)	58th (1903–1905)	Francis G. Newlands (D) (Note: Senator Newlands died on December 24, 1917, while in office.)
George S. Nixon (R) (Note: Senator Nixon died on June 5, 1912, while in office.)	59th (1905–1907)	Francis G. Newlands (D)
George S. Nixon (R)	60th (1907–1909)	Francis G. Newlands (D)
George S. Nixon (R)	61st (1909–1911)	Francis G. Newlands (D)
George S. Nixon (R)	62nd (1911–1913)	Francis G. Newlands (D)
William A. Massey (R) (Note: Senator Massey served from his appointment on July 1, 1912, following the death of his predecessor, George S. Nixon, to January 29, 1913, when his elected successor, Key Pittman, took office.)	62nd (1911–1913)	Francis G. Newlands (D)
Key Pittman (D) (Note: Senator Pittman died on November 10, 1940, while in office.)	62nd (1911–1913)	Francis G. Newlands (D)
Key Pittman (D)	63rd (1913–1915)	Francis G. Newlands (D)
Key Pittman (D)	64th (1915–1917)	Francis G. Newlands (D)
Key Pittman (D)	65th (1917–1919)	Francis G. Newlands (D)
Key Pittman (D)	65th (1917–1919)	Charles Henderson (D)
Key Pittman (D)	66th (1919–1921)	Charles Henderson (D)
Key Pittman (D)	67th (1921–1923)	Tasker Oddie (R)
Key Pittman (D)	68th (1923–1925)	Tasker Oddie (R)
Key Pittman (D)	69th (1925–1927)	Tasker Oddie (R)
Key Pittman (D)	70th (1927–1929)	Tasker Oddie (R)
Key Pittman (D)	71st (1929–1931)	Tasker Oddie (R)
Key Pittman (D)	72nd (1931–1933)	Tasker Oddie (R)
Key Pittman (D)	73rd (1933–1935)	Pat McCarran (D) (Note: Senator McCarran died on September 28, 1954, while in office.)
Key Pittman (D)	74th (1935–1937)	Pat McCarran (D)
Key Pittman (D)	75th (1937–1939)	Pat McCarran (D)
Key Pittman (D)	76th (1939–1941)	Pat McCarran (D)
Berkeley L. Bunker (D) (Note: Senator Bunker served from his appointment on November 27, 1940, following the death of his predecessor, Key Pittman, to December 6, 1942, the day before his elected successor, James G. Scrugham, took office.)	76th (1939–1941)	Pat McCarran (D)
Berkeley L. Bunker (D)	77th (1941–1943)	Pat McCarran (D)
James G. Scrugham (D) (Note: Senator Scrugham died on June 23, 1945, while in office.)	77th (1941–1943)	Pat McCarran (D)
James G. Scrugham (D)	78th (1943–1945)	Pat McCarran (D)
James G. Scrugham (D)	79th (1945–1947)	Pat McCarran (D)
Edward P. Carville (D)	79th (1945–1947)	Pat McCarran (D)
George W. Malone (R)	80th (1947–1949)	Pat McCarran (D)
George W. Malone (R)	81st (1949–1951)	Pat McCarran (D)
George W. Malone (R)	82nd (1951–1953)	Pat McCarran (D)
George W. Malone (R)	83rd (1953–1955)	Pat McCarran (D)
George W. Malone (R)	83rd (1953–1955)	Ernest S. Brown (R) (Note: Senator Brown served from his appointment on October 1, 1954, following the death of his predecessor, Pat McCarran, to December 1, 1954, when his elected successor, Alan Bible, took office.)
George W. Malone (R)	83rd (1953–1955)	Alan Bible (D) (Note: Senator Bible resigned on December 17, 1974, in order to give his successor, Paul Laxalt, an advantage in terms of seniority.)
George W. Malone (R)	84th (1955–1957)	Alan Bible (D)
George W. Malone (R)	85th (1957–1959)	Alan Bible (D)
Howard Cannon (D)	86th (1959–1961)	Alan Bible (D)
Howard Cannon (D)	87th (1961–1963)	Alan Bible (D)
Howard Cannon (D)	88th (1963–1965)	Alan Bible (D)
Howard Cannon (D)	89th (1965–1967)	Alan Bible (D)
Howard Cannon (D)	90th (1967–1969)	Alan Bible (D)
Howard Cannon (D)	91st (1969–1971)	Alan Bible (D)
Howard Cannon (D)	92nd (1971–1973)	Alan Bible (D)
Howard Cannon (D)	93rd (1973–1975)	Alan Bible (D)
Howard Cannon (D)	93rd (1973–1975)	Paul Laxalt (R)
Howard Cannon (D)	94th (1975–1977)	Paul Laxalt (R)
Howard Cannon (D)	95th (1977–1979)	Paul Laxalt (R)
Howard Cannon (D)	96th (1979–1981)	Paul Laxalt (R)
Howard Cannon (D)	97th (1981–1983)	Paul Laxalt (R)
Chic Hecht (R)	98th (1983–1985)	Paul Laxalt (R)
Chic Hecht (R)	99th (1985–1987)	Paul Laxalt (R)
Chic Hecht (R)	100th (1987–1989)	Harry Reid (D)
Richard Bryan (D)	101st (1989–1991)	Harry Reid (D)
Richard Bryan (D)	102nd (1991–1993)	Harry Reid (D)
Richard Bryan (D)	103rd (1993–1995)	Harry Reid (D)
Richard Bryan (D)	104th (1995–1997)	Harry Reid (D)
Richard Bryan (D)	105th (1997–1999)	Harry Reid (D)
Richard Bryan (D)	106th (1999–2001)	Harry Reid (D)
John Ensign (R) (Note: Senator Ensign resigned on May 3, 2011, after a scandal about an alleged extramarital affair led to an investigation by the Senate Ethics Committee.)	107th (2001–2003)	Harry Reid (D)
John Ensign (R)	108th (2003–2005)	Harry Reid (D)
John Ensign (R)	109th (2005–2007)	Harry Reid (D)
John Ensign (R)	110th (2007–2009)	Harry Reid (D)
John Ensign (R)	111th (2009–2011)	Harry Reid (D)
John Ensign (R)	112th (2011–2013)	Harry Reid (D)
Dean Heller (R)	112th (2011–2013)	Harry Reid (D)
Dean Heller (R)	113th (2013–2015)	Harry Reid (D)
Dean Heller (R)	114th (2015–2017)	Harry Reid (D)
Dean Heller (R)	115th (2017–2019)	Catherine Cortez; Masto (D)
Jacky Rosen (D)	116th (2019–2021)	Catherine Cortez; Masto (D)
Jacky Rosen (D)	117th (2021–2023)	Catherine Cortez; Masto (D)
Jacky Rosen (D)	118th (2023–2025)	Catherine Cortez; Masto (D)
Jacky Rosen (D)	119th (2025–2027)	Catherine Cortez; Masto (D)

== U.S. House of Representatives ==
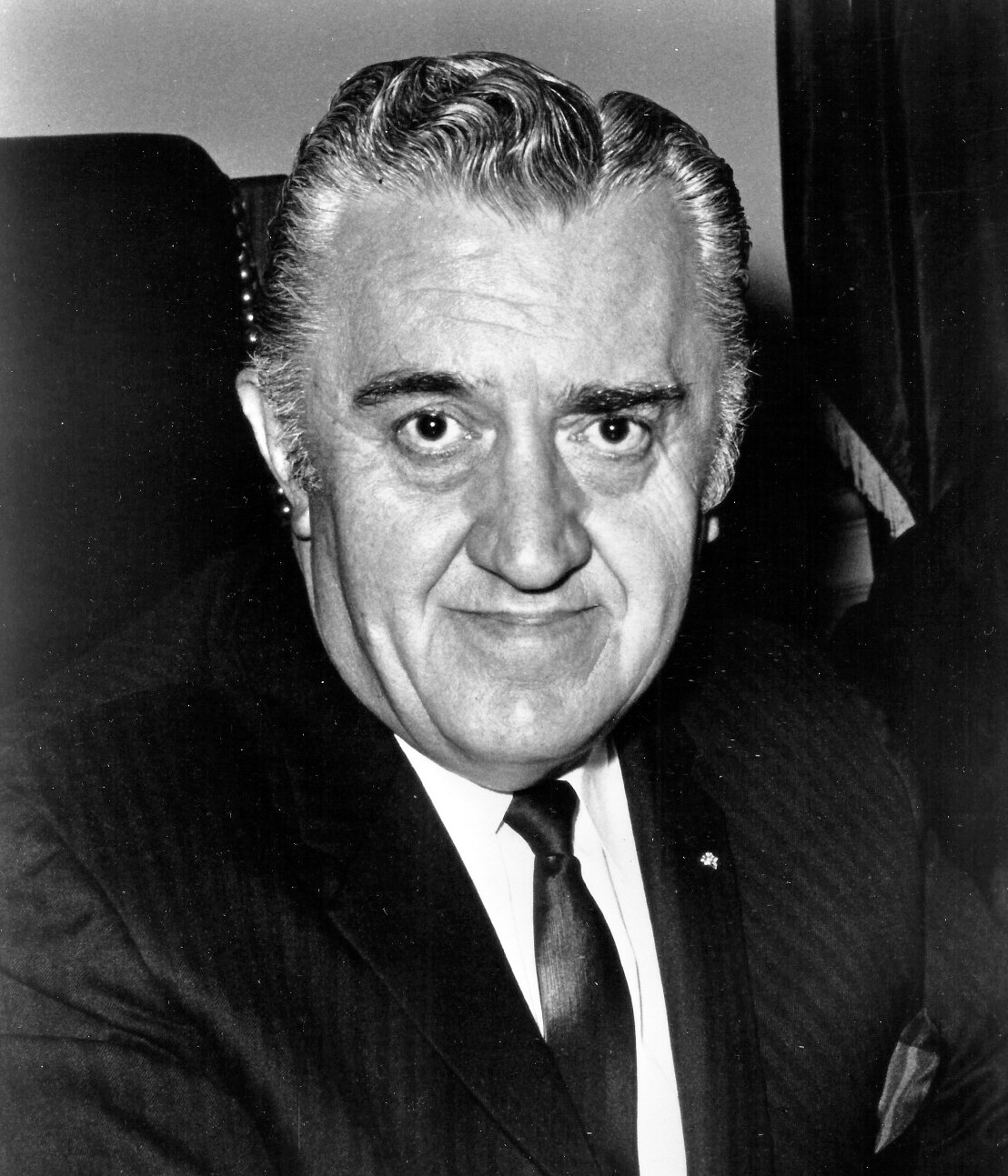
Walter S. Baring Jr., Nevada's longest serving member of the U.S. House

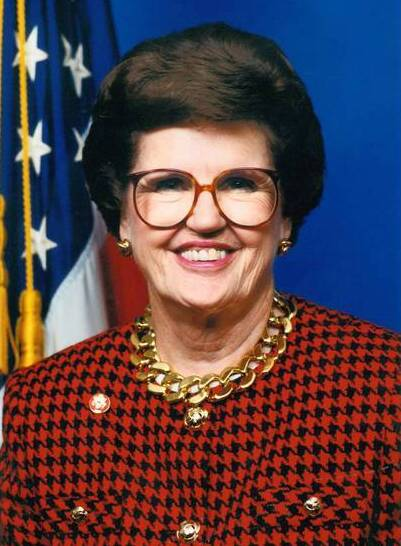
Barbara Vucanovich, Nevada's first female representative

Fifty-one people have represented Nevada in the House of Representatives, including 26 Republicans, 23 Democrats, one member of the Silver Party, and one independent politician. Of those, two non-voting delegates represented the Nevada Territory prior to its admittance to the Union in 1864.

Having served ten terms, Democrat Walter S. Baring Jr. is the longest-serving US representative in Nevada history. The first woman from Nevada to be elected to a federal office is Republican Barbara F. Vucanovich, who served seven terms from 1983 to 1997.

Each district uses a popular vote to elect a member of its delegation in the House of Representatives. Districts are redrawn every ten years, after data from the United States census is collected. Nevada has had four districts represented in the House since the 2010 census. As of 2026, Nevada is represented in the House by Democrats Dina Titus, Susie Lee, and Steven Horsford, and by Republican Mark Amodei.

=== Historical timeline ===
Democratic (D)
Independent (I)
Republican (R)
Silver (Sv)

==== 1861–1864: 1 non-voting delegate ====
The Nevada Territory was created on March 2, 1861. Beginning with the 37th United States Congress, it sent a non-voting delegate to the House.

Delegates to the House of Representatives from Nevada Territory from 1861 to 1864
Congress	Delegate
37th (1861–1863)	John Cradlebaugh (I)
38th (1863–1865)	Gordon Newell Mott (R)

==== 1864–1983: 1 seat ====
Nevada was admitted to the Union as a state on October 31, 1864. Following statehood, it was apportioned one seat in the House, beginning with the 38th United States Congress.

Members of the House of Representatives from Nevada from 1864 to 1983
Congress	At-large
38th (1863–1865)	Henry G. Worthington (R)
39th (1865–1867)	Delos R. Ashley (R)
40th (1867–1869)	Delos R. Ashley (R)
41st (1869–1871)	Thomas Fitch (R)
42nd (1871–1873)	Charles West Kendall (D)
43rd (1873–1875)	Charles West Kendall (D)
44th (1875–1877)	William Woodburn (R)
45th (1877–1879)	Thomas Wren (R)
46th (1879–1881)	Rollin M. Daggett (R)
47th (1881–1883)	George W. Cassidy (D)
48th (1883–1885)	George W. Cassidy (D)
49th (1885–1887)	William Woodburn (R)
50th (1887–1889)	William Woodburn (R)
51st (1889–1891)	Horace F. Bartine (R)
52nd (1891–1893)	Horace F. Bartine (R)
53rd (1893–1895)	Francis G. Newlands (Sv)
54th (1895–1897)	Francis G. Newlands (Sv)
55th (1897–1899)	Francis G. Newlands (Sv)
56th (1899–1901)	Francis G. Newlands (Sv)
57th (1901–1903)	Francis G. Newlands (Sv)
58th (1903–1905)	Clarence D. Van Duzer (D)
59th (1905–1907)	Clarence D. Van Duzer (D)
60th (1907–1909)	George A. Bartlett (D)
61st (1909–1911)	George A. Bartlett (D)
62nd (1911–1913)	Edwin E. Roberts (R)
63rd (1913–1915)	Edwin E. Roberts (R)
64th (1915–1917)	Edwin E. Roberts (R)
65th (1917–1919)	Edwin E. Roberts (R)
66th (1919–1921)	Charles R. Evans (D)
67th (1921–1923)	Samuel S. Arentz (R)
68th (1923–1925)	Charles L. Richards (D)
69th (1925–1927)	Samuel S. Arentz (R)
70th (1927–1929)	Samuel S. Arentz (R)
71st (1929–1931)	Samuel S. Arentz (R)
72nd (1931–1933)	Samuel S. Arentz (R)
73rd (1933–1935)	James G. Scrugham (D)
74th (1935–1937)	James G. Scrugham (D)
75th (1937–1939)	James G. Scrugham (D)
76th (1939–1941)	James G. Scrugham (D)
77th (1941–1943)	James G. Scrugham (D)
78th (1943–1945)	Maurice J. Sullivan (D)
79th (1945–1947)	Berkeley L. Bunker (D)
80th (1947–1949)	Charles H. Russell (R)
81st (1949–1951)	Walter S. Baring Jr. (D)
82nd (1951–1953)	Walter S. Baring Jr. (D)
83rd (1953–1955)	Clarence Clifton; Young (R)
84th (1955–1957)	Clarence Clifton; Young (R)
85th (1957–1959)	Walter S. Baring Jr. (D)
86th (1959–1961)	Walter S. Baring Jr. (D)
87th (1961–1963)	Walter S. Baring Jr. (D)
88th (1963–1965)	Walter S. Baring Jr. (D)
89th (1965–1967)	Walter S. Baring Jr. (D)
90th (1967–1969)	Walter S. Baring Jr. (D)
91st (1969–1971)	Walter S. Baring Jr. (D)
92nd (1971–1973)	Walter S. Baring Jr. (D)
93rd (1973–1975)	David Towell (R)
94th (1975–1977)	James David Santini (D)
95th (1977–1979)	James David Santini (D)
96th (1979–1981)	James David Santini (D)
97th (1981–1983)	James David Santini (D)

==== 1983–2003: 2 seats ====
Following the 1980 census, Nevada was apportioned two seats in the House.

Members of the House of Representatives from Nevada from 1983 to 2003
Congress	1st district	2nd district
98th (1983–1985)	Harry Reid (D)	Barbara Vucanovich (R)
99th (1985–1987)	Harry Reid (D)	Barbara Vucanovich (R)
100th (1987–1989)	James Bilbray (D)	Barbara Vucanovich (R)
101st (1989–1991)	James Bilbray (D)	Barbara Vucanovich (R)
102nd (1991–1993)	James Bilbray (D)	Barbara Vucanovich (R)
103rd (1993–1995)	James Bilbray (D)	Barbara Vucanovich (R)
104th (1995–1997)	John Ensign (R)	Barbara Vucanovich (R)
105th (1997–1999)	John Ensign (R)	Jim Gibbons (R)
106th (1999–2001)	Shelley Berkley (D)	Jim Gibbons (R)
107th (2001–2003)	Shelley Berkley (D)	Jim Gibbons (R)

==== 2003–2013: 3 seats ====
Following the 2000 census, Nevada was apportioned three seats in the House.

Members of the House of Representatives from Nevada from 2003 to 2013
Congress	1st district	2nd district	3rd district
108th (2003–2005)	Shelley Berkley (D)	Jim Gibbons (R)	Jon Porter (R)
109th (2005–2007)	Shelley Berkley (D)	Jim Gibbons (R)	Jon Porter (R)
110th (2007–2009)	Shelley Berkley (D)	Dean Heller (R) (Note: Representative Heller resigned from the House on May 9, 2011, following appointment to the United States Senate.)	Jon Porter (R)
111th (2009–2011)	Shelley Berkley (D)	Dean Heller (R)	Dina Titus (D)
112th (2011–2013)	Shelley Berkley (D)	Dean Heller (R)	Joe Heck (R)
112th (2011–2013)	Shelley Berkley (D)	Mark Amodei (R)	Joe Heck (R)

==== 2013–present: 4 seats ====
Since the 2010 census, Nevada has been apportioned four seats in the House.

Members of the House of Representatives from Nevada from 2013 to present
Congress	1st district	2nd district	3rd district	4th district
113th (2013–2015)	Dina Titus (D)	Mark Amodei (R)	Joe Heck (R)	Steven Horsford (D)
114th (2015–2017)	Dina Titus (D)	Mark Amodei (R)	Joe Heck (R)	Cresent Hardy (R)
115th (2017–2019)	Dina Titus (D)	Mark Amodei (R)	Jacky Rosen (D)	Ruben Kihuen (D)
116th (2019–2021)	Dina Titus (D)	Mark Amodei (R)	Susie Lee (D)	Steven Horsford (D)
117th (2021–2023)	Dina Titus (D)	Mark Amodei (R)	Susie Lee (D)	Steven Horsford (D)
118th (2023–2025)	Dina Titus (D)	Mark Amodei (R)	Susie Lee (D)	Steven Horsford (D)
119th (2025–2027)	Dina Titus (D)	Mark Amodei (R)	Susie Lee (D)	Steven Horsford (D)
120th (2027–2029)	Dina Titus (D)	Teresa Benitez-Thompson (D)	Susie Lee (D)	Steven Horsford (D)

== See also ==
- List of United States congressional districts
- Nevada's congressional districts
- Political party strength in Nevada
