= George W. Merrill =

American lawyer and diplomat

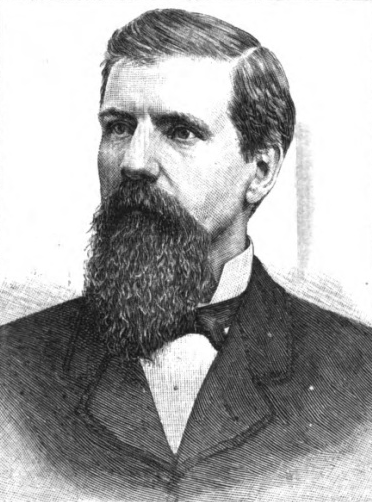
- Frank Leslie's Illustrated Newspaper, April 11, 1885

United States Minister to Hawaii
- In office 1885–1889
- President: Grover Cleveland
- Preceded by: Rollin M. Daggett
- Succeeded by: John L. Stevens

Member of the Nevada Legislature
- In office 1881–1883

District Attorney of Eureka County, Nevada
- In office 1874–1880

District Attorney of Nye County, Nevada
- In office 1864–1868

Personal details
- Born: June 26, 1837 Turner, Maine, US
- Died: January 10, 1914 (aged 76) San Francisco, California, US
- Party: Democratic
- Education: Bowdoin College
- Occupation: Lawyer

George W. Merrill (June 26, 1837 – January 10, 1914) was an American politician of the 19th century. He was born in Turner, Maine. He graduated from Bowdoin College in 1859 before studying law. He was admitted to the bar in Indiana in 1861. During the American Civil War, he joined the 16th Indiana Infantry Regiment.

Merrill was District Attorney of Nye County, Nevada from 1864 to 1868. From 1874 to 1880, he served as District Attorney of Eureka County, Nevada, before being elected to the Nevada Legislature in 1880.

On April 2, 1885, nominated by President Grover Cleveland, Merrill was appointed U.S. Minister Resident (similar to modern-day ambassador) to the Kingdom of Hawaii. He presented his credentials on June 12, 1885, and was recalled on September 23, 1889. He replaced Rollin M. Daggett, and was replaced by John L. Stevens. He later worked in San Francisco, California as a lawyer. He died there of an illness of seven weeks on January 10, 1914, aged 76.

Diplomatic posts
Preceded by Rollin M. Daggett	United States Minister to Hawaii; 1885–1889	Succeeded by John L. Stevens
