= W. M. Buell =

American politician

Member of the California State Assembly from the 12th district
- In office 1860-1862
- Preceded by: John Daggett
- Succeeded by: Tim N. Machin, Charles West Kendall, B. K. Davis

Personal details
- Party: Douglas Democratic; Democratic

W. M. Buell was an American politician who served as a member of the California State Assembly for the 12th District, 1861–62, from Klamath County. He was a Douglas Democrat.

Political offices
Preceded by John Daggett	California State Assemblyman, 12th District (Klamath/Del Norte County seat); 1861–1862	Succeeded by B. K. Davis, Charles West Kendall, Tim N. Machin
