= List of United States representatives from Nevada =

The following is an alphabetical list of United States representatives from the state of Nevada. For chronological tables of members of both houses of the United States Congress from the state (through the present day), see Nevada's congressional delegations. The list of names should be complete (as of January 3, 2015), but other data may be incomplete. It includes members who have represented both the state and the territory, both past and present.

== Current members ==
Current U.S. representatives from Nevada
District	Member (Residence)	Party	Incumbent since	CPVI (2025)	District map
1st	Dina Titus (Las Vegas)	Democratic	January 3, 2013	D+2	
2nd	Mark Amodei (Carson City)	Republican	September 13, 2011	R+7	
3rd	Susie Lee (Las Vegas)	Democratic	January 3, 2019	D+1	
4th	Steven Horsford (Las Vegas)	Democratic	January 3, 2019	D+2	

== List of members and delegates ==
Members / Delegates	Party	In office	District	Electoral history
Mark Amodei	Republican	September 15, 2011 – present	2nd	First elected to finish Dean Heller's term.
Samuel S. Arentz	Republican	March 4, 1921 – March 3, 1923	At-large	First elected in 1920. Retired to run for U.S. senator.
Samuel S. Arentz	Republican	March 4, 1925 – March 3, 1933	At-large	Elected again in 1924. Lost re-election.
Delos R. Ashley	Republican	March 4, 1865 – March 3, 1869	At-large	First elected in 1865. Retired.
Walter S. Baring Jr.	Democratic	January 3, 1949 – January 3, 1953	At-large	First elected in 1948. Lost re-election.
Walter S. Baring Jr.	Democratic	January 3, 1957 – January 3, 1973	At-large	First elected in 1956. Lost renomination.
Horace F. Bartine	Republican	March 4, 1889 – March 3, 1893	At-large	First elected in 1888. Retired.
George A. Bartlett	Democratic	March 4, 1907 – March 3, 1911	At-large	First elected in 1906. Retired.
Shelley Berkley	Democratic	January 3, 1999 – January 3, 2013	1st	First elected in 1998. Retired to run for U.S. senator.
James Bilbray	Democratic	January 3, 1987 – January 3, 1995	1st	First elected in 1986. Lost re-election.
Berkeley L. Bunker	Democratic	January 3, 1945 – January 3, 1947	At-large	Elected in 1944. Retired to run for U.S. senator.
George Williams Cassidy	Democratic	March 4, 1881 – March 3, 1885	At-large	First elected in 1880. Lost re-election.
John Cradlebaugh	Independent	December 2, 1861 – March 3, 1863	Territory	Elected in 1861. [data missing]
Rollin M. Daggett	Republican	March 4, 1879 – March 3, 1881	At-large	Elected in 1878. Lost re-election.
John Ensign	Republican	January 3, 1995 – January 3, 1999	1st	First elected in 1994. Retired to run for U.S. senator.
Charles R. Evans	Democratic	March 4, 1919 – March 3, 1921	At-large	Elected in 1918. Lost re-election.
Thomas Fitch	Republican	March 4, 1869 – March 3, 1871	At-large	Elected in 1868. Lost re-election.
Jim Gibbons	Republican	January 3, 1997 – December 31, 2006	2nd	First elected in 1996. Retired to run for Governor of Nevada and resigned early to become Governor.
Cresent Hardy	Republican	January 3, 2015 – January 3, 2017	4th	First elected in 2014. Lost re-election.
Joe Heck	Republican	January 3, 2011 – January 3, 2017	3rd	First elected in 2010. Retired to run for U.S. senator.
Dean Heller	Republican	January 3, 2007 – May 9, 2011	2nd	First elected in 2006. Resigned to become U.S. senator.
Steven Horsford	Democratic	January 3, 2013 – January 3, 2015	4th	First elected in 2012. Lost re-election.
Steven Horsford	Democratic	January 3, 2019– present	4th	Elected again in 2018.
Charles West Kendall	Democratic	March 4, 1871 – March 3, 1875	At-large	First elected in 1870. Retired.
Ruben Kihuen	Democratic	January 3, 2017 – January 3, 2019	4th	First elected in 2016. Retired.
Susie Lee	Democratic	January 3, 2019 – present	3rd	First elected in 2018.
Gordon Newell Mott	Republican	March 4, 1863 – October 31, 1864	Territory	Elected in 1862. Statehood achieved.
Francis G. Newlands	Democratic	March 4, 1893 – March 3, 1903	At-large	First elected in 1892. Retired to run for U.S. senator.
Jon C. Porter	Republican	January 3, 2003 – January 3, 2009	3rd	First elected in 2002. Lost re-election.
Harry Reid	Democratic	January 3, 1983 – January 3, 1987	1st	First elected in 1982. Retired to run for U.S. senator.
Charles L. Richards	Democratic	March 4, 1923 – March 3, 1925	At-large	First elected in 1922. Lost re-election.
Edwin E. Roberts	Republican	March 4, 1911 – March 3, 1919	At-large	First elected in 1910. Retired to run for U.S. senator.
Jacky Rosen	Democratic	January 3, 2017 – January 3, 2019	3rd	First elected in 2016. Retired to run for U.S. senator.
Charles H. Russell	Republican	January 3, 1947 – January 3, 1949	At-large	Elected in 1946. Lost re-election.
James David Santini	Democratic	January 3, 1975 – January 3, 1983	At-large	First elected in 1974. Retired to run for U.S. senator.
James G. Scrugham	Democratic	March 4, 1933 – December 7, 1942	At-large	First elected in 1932. Resigned after being elected to the U.S. senator.
Maurice J. Sullivan	Democratic	January 3, 1943 – January 3, 1945	At-large	Elected in 1942. Lost renomination.
Dina Titus	Democratic	January 3, 2009 – January 3, 2011	3rd	Elected in 2008. Lost re-election.
Dina Titus	Democratic	January 3, 2013 – present	1st	Elected again in 2012.
David Towell	Republican	January 3, 1973 – January 3, 1975	At-large	Elected in 1972. Lost re-election.
Clarence D. Van Duzer	Democratic	March 4, 1903 – March 3, 1907	At-large	First elected in 1902. Retired.
Barbara Vucanovich	Republican	January 3, 1983 – January 3, 1997	2nd	First elected in 1982. Retired.
William Woodburn	Republican	March 4, 1875 – March 3, 1877	At-large	Elected in 1874. [data missing]
William Woodburn	Republican	March 4, 1885 – March 3, 1889	At-large	Elected again in 1884. Retired.
Henry G. Worthington	Republican	October 31, 1864 – March 3, 1865	At-large	First elected October 31, 1864. Lost renomination.
Thomas Wren	Republican	March 4, 1877 – March 3, 1879	At-large	Elected in 1876. [data missing]
Clarence Clifton Young	Republican	January 3, 1953 – January 3, 1957	At-large	First elected in 1952. Retired to run for U.S. senator.

== Key ==
Key to party colors and abbreviations for members of the U.S. Congress and other politicians or officials
Alaskan Independence (AKIP) Know Nothing (KN) American Labor (AL) Anti-Jacksonian (Anti-J); National Republican (NR) Anti-Administration (AA) Anti-Masonic (Anti-M) Conservative (Con) Covenant (Cov)	Democratic (D) Democratic–Farmer–Labor (DFL) Democratic–NPL (D-NPL) Dixiecrat (Dix), States' Rights (SR) Democratic-Republican (DR) Farmer–Labor (FL) Federalist (F); Pro-Administration (PA)	Free Soil (FS) Fusion (Fus) Greenback (GB) Independence (IPM) Jacksonian (J) Liberal (Lib) Libertarian (L) National Union (NU)	Nonpartisan League (NPL) Nullifier (N) Opposition Northern (O); Opposition Southern (O) Populist (Pop) Progressive (Prog) Prohibition (Proh) Readjuster (Rea)	Republican (R) Silver (Sv) Silver Republican (SvR) Socialist (Soc) Union (U) Unconditional Union (UU) Vermont Progressive (VP) Whig (W)	Independent (I) Nonpartisan (NP)

== See also ==
- List of United States senators from Nevada
- Nevada's congressional delegations
- Nevada's congressional districts
