= Clarence D. Van Duzer =

American politician (1864–1947)

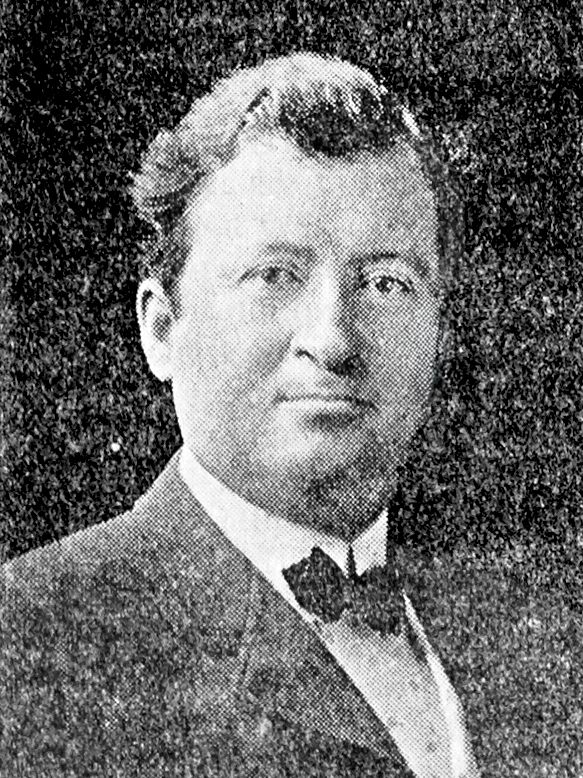
- Van Duzer in 1903

Member of the U.S. House of Representatives from Nevada's at-large district
- In office March 4, 1903 – March 3, 1907
- Preceded by: Francis G. Newlands
- Succeeded by: George A. Bartlett

Personal details
- Born: May 4, 1864 Idaho City, Idaho Territory, U.S.
- Died: September 28, 1947 (aged 83) Passaic, New Jersey, U.S.
- Party: Democratic
- Education: University of Nevada, Reno; Georgetown University
- Profession: Attorney

Clarence Dunn Van Duzer (May 4, 1864 – September 28, 1947) an American attorney and politician who served as a United States representative from Nevada. He served in the Nevada Assembly.

== Early life and education ==
Van Duzer was born Idaho City, Idaho, and attended public and private schools in Nevada and California. He attended the University of California, Berkeley before graduating from the University of Nevada, Reno in 1889. He also studied law at Georgetown University, graduating in 1893.

== Career ==
In 1893, VanDuzer began to practice before the Supreme Court of the District of Columbia. In 1892, He was appointed by the Governor of Nevada to the position of State Land Agent. He served as private secretary to Senator Francis G. Newlands for five years.

Van Duzer returned to Nevada, where he worked in mining and practiced law. He was elected District Attorney of Humboldt County in 1898. He was a member of the Nevada Assembly from 1900 to 1902 and served as speaker. Elected and re-elected as a Democrat to the United States House of Representatives, he served from March 4, 1903, to March 3, 1907.

After leaving the House of Representatives, Van Duzer resumed mining. In 1922, he moved to Passaic, New Jersey and worked in the newspaper industry.

== Death ==
Van Duzer died in Passaic, New Jersey on September 28, 1947. He was cremated and his ashes were scattered on the Humboldt River near Winnemucca, Nevada.

U.S. House of Representatives
Preceded by Francis G. Newlands	Member of the U.S. House of Representatives from Nevada's at-large congressional district 1903–1907	Succeeded by George A. Bartlett
