= Thomas Wren (Nevada politician) =

American politician

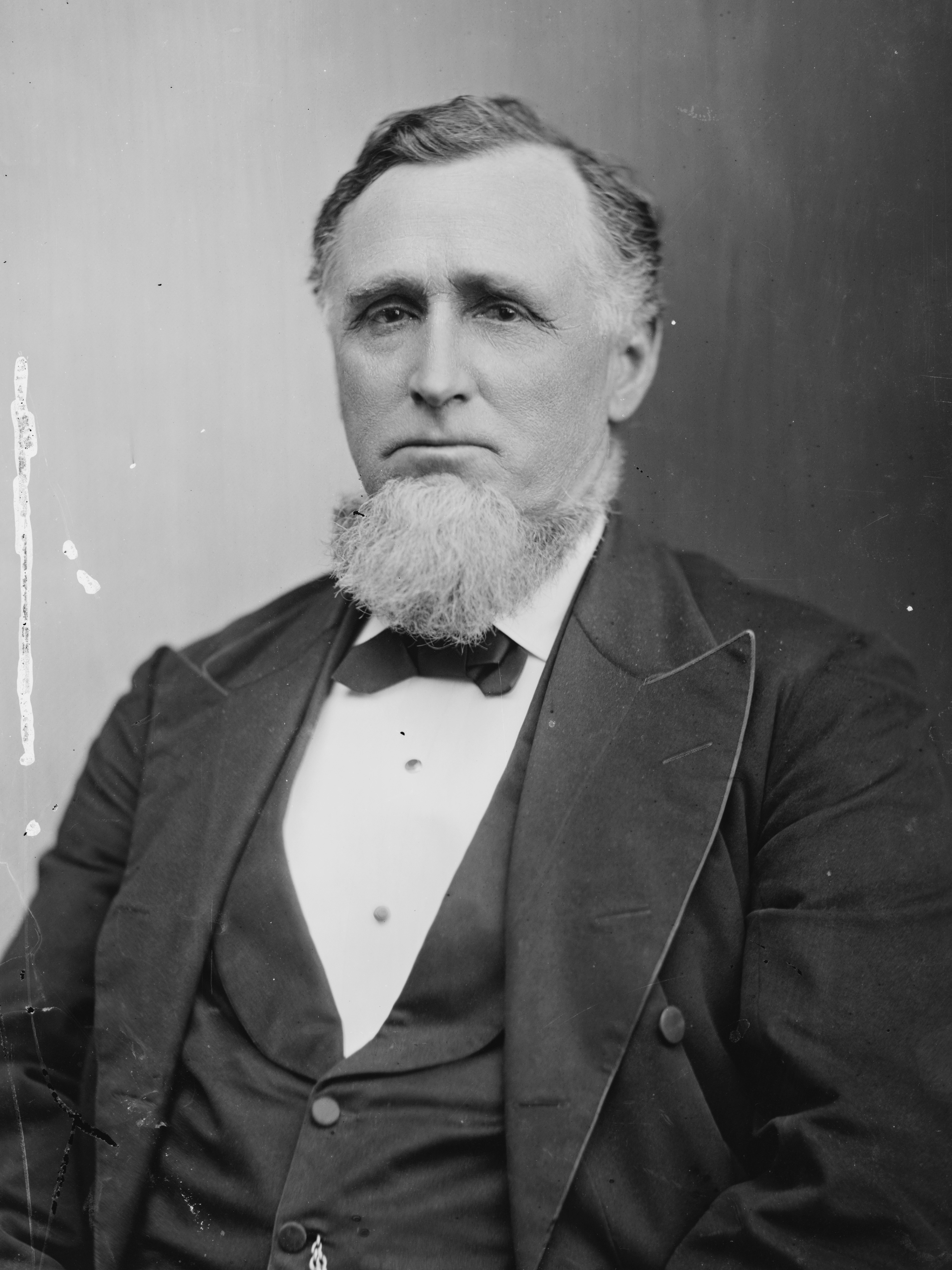

Member of the U.S. House of Representatives from Nevada's at-large district
- In office March 4, 1877 – March 3, 1879
- Preceded by: William Woodburn
- Succeeded by: Rollin M. Daggett

Member of the Nevada State Assembly
- In office 1875

Personal details
- Born: January 2, 1824 McArthurstown, Ohio, U.S.
- Died: February 5, 1904 (aged 80) Reno, Nevada, U.S.
- Party: Republican

Thomas Wren (January 2, 1824 – February 5, 1904) was a United States representative from Nevada. He belonged to the Republican Party and represented the Nevada At-Large Congressional District in the 45th Congress, from 1877 to 1879. He served in the Nevada Assembly.

U.S. House of Representatives
Preceded by William Woodburn	Member of the U.S. House of Representatives from Nevada's at-large congressional district 1877–1879	Succeeded by Rollin M. Daggett
