= Horace F. Bartine =

American politician (1848–1918)

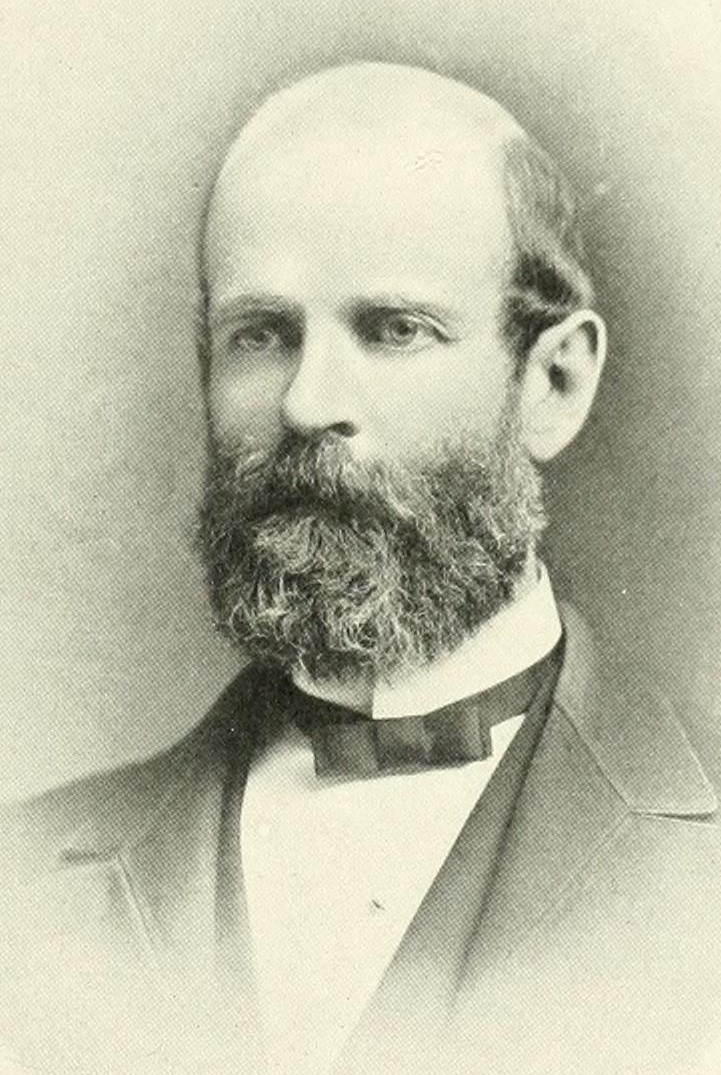

Member of the U.S. House of Representatives from Nevada's at-large district
- In office March 4, 1889 – March 3, 1893
- Preceded by: William Woodburn
- Succeeded by: Francis G. Newlands

Personal details
- Born: March 21, 1848 New York City, U.S.
- Died: August 27, 1918 (aged 70) Winnemucca, Nevada, U.S.
- Party: Republican
- Spouse: Lydia M. Cooper Bartine
- Profession: Attorney
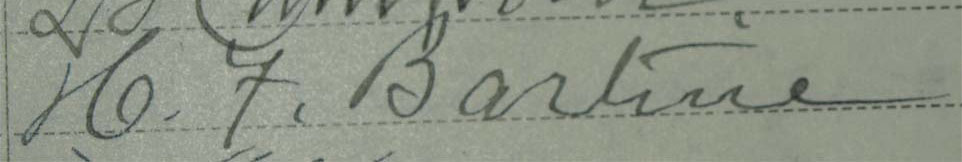
- Signature

Horace Franklin Bartine (March 21, 1848 – August 27, 1918) was a United States representative from Nevada.

== Biography ==
Bartine was born in New York City on March 21, 1848, and his family moved to New Jersey in 1858. He attended the local schools until age 15, when he enlisted as a private in the 8th New Jersey Volunteer Infantry Regiment. He served from July 1863 until the end of the American Civil War, was wounded at the Battle of the Wilderness, and was present at Appomattox Court House when the Army of Northern Virginia surrendered.

He returned to New Jersey after the war and became a farmer. Bartine moved to Carson City, Nevada, in 1869 and became active in the business of producing copper sulfate for commercial purposes. He later studied law, was admitted to the bar in 1880, and began a practice.

A Republican, Bartine served as district attorney of Ormsby County from 1880 to 1882. In 1888 he was elected to the U.S. House. He was reelected in 1890, and served from March 4, 1889, to March 3, 1893. He was not a candidate for renomination in 1892. In Congress, Bartine favored bimetallism for U.S. currency.

After leaving Congress Bartine moved to Chicago to become editor of the National Bimetallist magazine. He returned to Carson City in 1902 and was appointed a state tax examiner in 1904. In 1907 he was named to the state railroad commission, and he served as chairman of the commission until his death.

In August 1918 Bartine stood as a Democratic candidate for the nomination of representative to congress. While in Winnemucca on a campaign of the state, he fell ill and died on August 27 following a severe heart attack. He was buried at Lone Mountain Cemetery in Carson City.

U.S. House of Representatives
Preceded by William Woodburn	Member of the U.S. House of Representatives from Nevada's at-large congressional district 1889–1893	Succeeded by Francis G. Newlands
