= Edwin E. Roberts =

American politician (1870–1933)

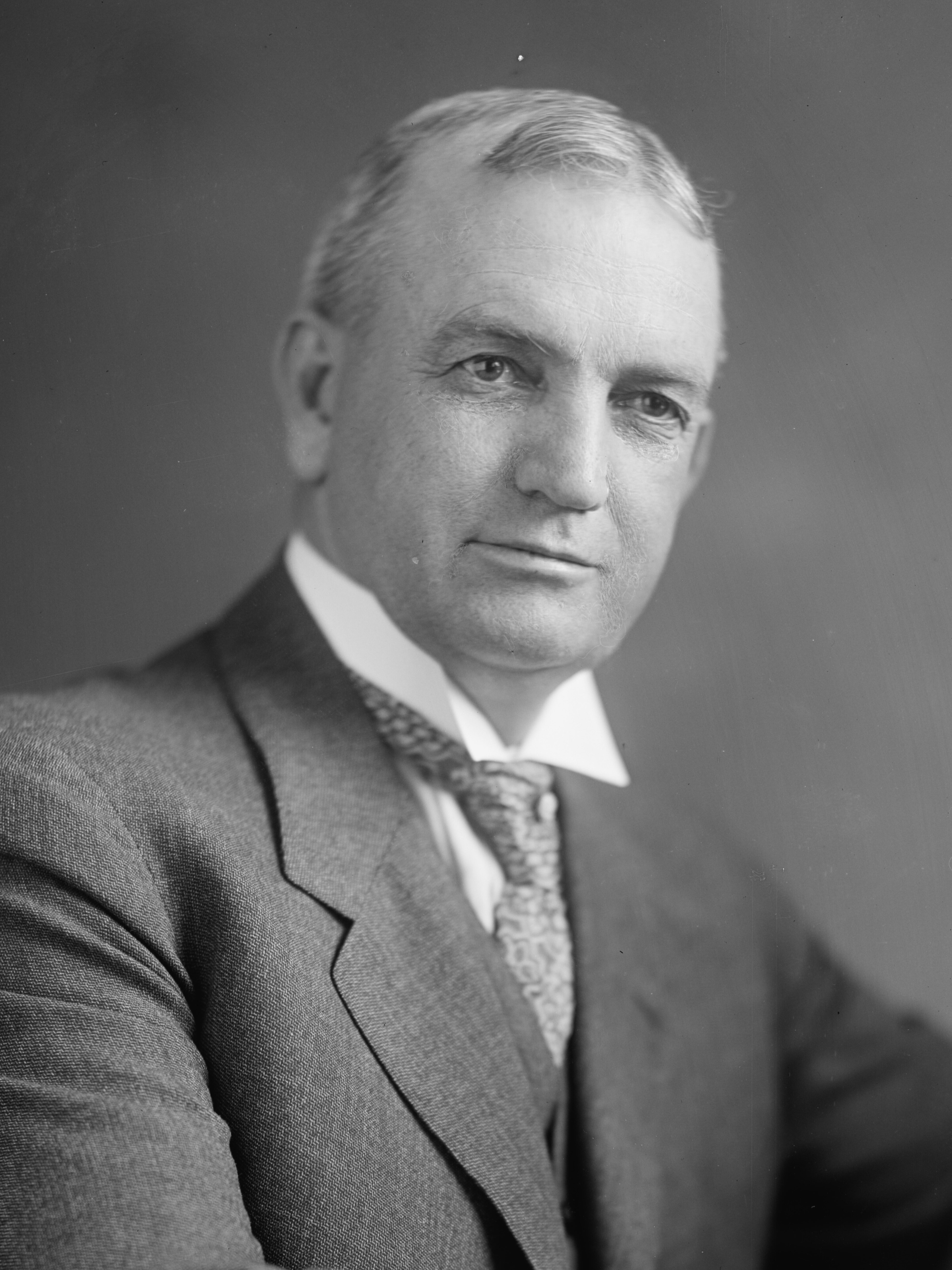

Mayor of Reno, Nevada
- In office 1923–1933
- Preceded by: Harry Stewart
- Succeeded by: Sam Frank (acting)

Member of the U.S. House of Representatives from Nevada's at-large district
- In office March 4, 1911 – March 3, 1919
- Preceded by: George A. Bartlett
- Succeeded by: Charles R. Evans

Personal details
- Born: December 12, 1870 Pleasant Grove, California, U.S.
- Died: December 11, 1933 (aged 62) Reno, Nevada, U.S.
- Resting place: Odd Fellows Cemetery, Reno, Nevada
- Party: Republican
- Relations: Walter Johnson (son-in-law)
- Education: California State Normal School
- Profession: Attorney

Edwin Ewing Roberts (December 12, 1870 – December 11, 1933) was an American attorney and politician from Nevada. He is best known for his service as a United States representative from 1911 to 1919, and mayor of Reno, Nevada from 1923 to 1933.

== Biography ==
Roberts was born and raised in Pleasant Grove, California. He attended the public schools and graduated from the California State Normal School in 1891. He taught school in Hollister, California, from 1891 to 1897 and Empire, Ormsby County, Nevada from 1897 to 1899.

After studying law while teaching school, Roberts was admitted to the bar in 1899 and commenced practice in Carson City, Nevada. A Republican, he was district attorney of Ormsby County from 1900 to 1910. Beginning in 1912, he was a delegate to every state party convention and almost every national convention until 1932.

In 1910, Roberts was a successful Republican candidate for the U.S. House. He was reelected three times, and served from March 4, 1911, to March 3, 1919. On April 5, 1917, he voted against U.S. entry into World War I against Germany. Roberts did not seek renomination in 1918, but was an unsuccessful candidate for the United States Senate. He lost to Democrat Charles B. Henderson by a vote of 12,197 to 8,053, and relocated to Reno, where he re-established a law practice.

In 1923, Roberts was elected mayor of Reno. He was reelected in 1927 and 1931, and served until his death. Roberts was an unsuccessful candidate for the Republican nomination for U.S. Senator in 1926 and governor of Nevada in 1930.

== Death and burial ==
He died in Reno on December 11, 1933, one day before his 63rd birthday. Roberts was buried at Odd Fellows Cemetery in Reno.

== Family ==
Roberts was married twice. His first wife, Nora S. Range died in 1926. In 1929, he married Sadie Tomamichael of Reno. With his first wife, he was the father of children Frederick, Bobbie, and Hazel. With his second wife, he was the stepfather of Wilma and J. J. Tomamichael.

Roberts' daughter Hazel Lee Roberts was the wife of baseball pitcher Walter Johnson. They married in Roberts' Washington home on June 24, 1914, with the chaplain of the United States Senate presiding over the ceremony. Johnson served as a county commissioner in Maryland after his baseball career ended, and made an unsuccessful run for Congress as a Republican in 1940.

== See also ==
- List of mayors of Reno, Nevada

== Notes ==
Party political offices
Preceded by Samuel Platt	Republican nominee for U.S. Senator from Nevada (Class 3); 1918	Succeeded by Tasker Oddie
U.S. House of Representatives
Preceded by George A. Bartlett	Member of the U.S. House of Representatives from Nevada's at-large congressional district 1911–1919	Succeeded by Charles R. Evans
Political offices
Preceded by Harry Stewart	Mayor of Reno; 1923–1933	Succeeded by Sam Frank (acting)
