= Charles R. Evans =

American politician (1866–1954)

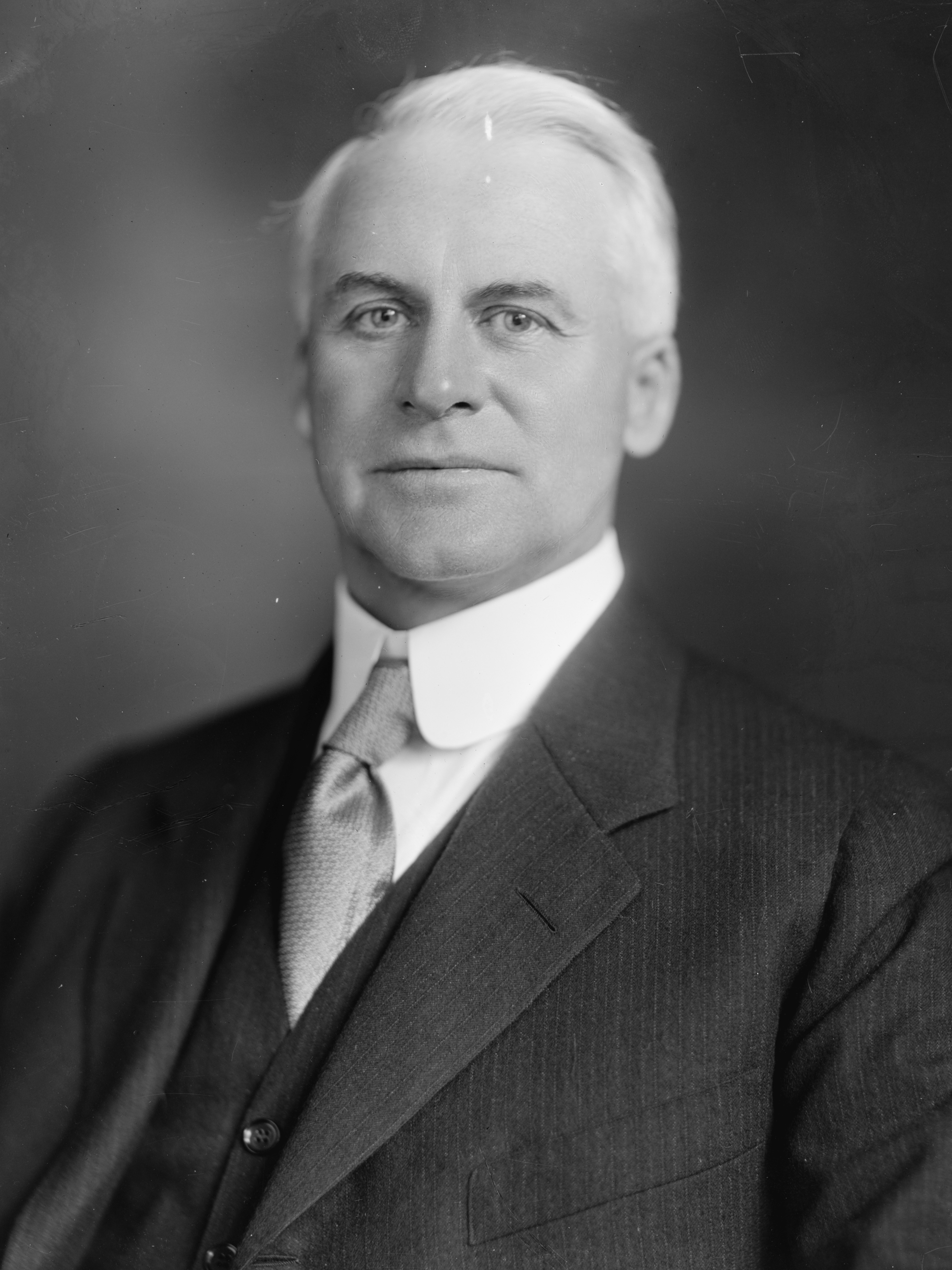

Member of the U.S. House of Representatives from Nevada's at-large district
- In office March 4, 1919 – March 3, 1921
- Preceded by: Edwin E. Roberts
- Succeeded by: Samuel S. Arentz

Personal details
- Born: August 9, 1866 Sangamon County, Illinois, U.S.
- Died: November 30, 1954 (aged 88) Kearney, Nebraska, U.S.
- Party: Democratic
- Profession: Mining

Charles Robley Evans (August 9, 1866 – November 30, 1954) was an American businessman and politician who served as a United States representative from Nevada for one term from 1919 to 1921.

== Life ==
Evans served as a delegate for Nevada at the 1908 Democratic National Convention and gave his vote to William Jennings Bryan for president and initially supported Charles A. Towne for the vice presidency until his name was withdrawn and switched his support to John W. Kern. In 1916 he sold his saloon to focus on developing his mining company, Wall Street Copper, in Luning, Nevada.

=== Congress ===
On May 7, 1918, Evans wrote a letter to William McKnight, the Secretary of the Democratic State Central committee, announcing his candidacy for Nevada's congressional House seat. Shortly before the end of World War I he stated his support of continuing the war until Germany was completely defeated and turned into a republic.

=== Defeat and later career ===
In 1920 he was defeated by Samuel S. Arentz, but remained in Washington, D.C., for a few years until moving to Miami, Florida and then returning to Nevada. From 1934 to 1948, he served as a Guide in the United States Capitol Guide Service.

== Death ==
He died on November 30, 1954, at the age of 88.

U.S. House of Representatives
Preceded by Edwin E. Roberts	Member of the U.S. House of Representatives from Nevada's at-large congressional district 1919–1921	Succeeded by Samuel S. Arentz
