= George W. Cassidy =

American politician (1836–1892)

George Williams Cassidy

Member of the U.S. House of Representatives from Nevada's at-large district
- In office March 4, 1881 – March 3, 1885
- Preceded by: Rollin M. Daggett
- Succeeded by: William Woodburn

Member of the Nevada Senate
- In office 1872–1879

Personal details
- Born: April 25, 1836 Bourbon County, Kentucky, U.S.
- Died: June 24, 1892 (aged 56) Reno, Nevada, U.S.
- Party: Democratic

George Williams Cassidy (April 25, 1836 – June 24, 1892) was a Democratic Party politician in California and Nevada who served two terms in the United States House of Representatives.

== Biography ==
Cassidy was born near Paris, Kentucky, on April 25, 1836, and his family moved to Missouri when he was five years old. He attended the local schools, studied with private tutors, and later studied law before deciding against a legal career.

Cassidy moved to California in 1857, and mined for gold before deciding on a career as a journalist. Active in politics from early adulthood, he became a member of the California Democratic Party's central committee. He became a reporter and editor, and worked for the Meadow Lake Sun (Meadow Lake, California), the White Pine News (Treasure City, Nevada), and the Inland News (Hamilton, Nevada).

In 1870 Cassidy moved to Eureka, Nevada, and became an owner of the Eureka Sentinel. He served in the Nevada State Senate from 1872 to 1879 and was the Senate President Pro Tempore in his final term.

In 1880 he ran successfully for Nevada's At-Large seat in the United States House of Representatives. He was reelected in 1882 and served from March 4, 1881, to March 3, 1885. In his second term Cassidy was chairman of the Committee on Pacific Railroads. He was an unsuccessful candidate for reelection in 1884. In 1886, he was appointed a national bank examiner for Nevada, Utah, California, and Colorado, and he served until 1890.

Cassidy was an unsuccessful candidate for election to Congress in 1888 and in 1890. He was a delegate to the 1892 Democratic National Convention. He was again nominated for Congress in 1892, but died before the election.

He died in Reno, Nevada, on June 24, 1892. He was buried at Hillside Cemetery in Reno.

U.S. House of Representatives
Preceded by Rollin M. Daggett	Member of the U.S. House of Representatives from Nevada's at-large congressional district 1881–1885	Succeeded by William Woodburn
