= Charles West Kendall =

American politician (1828–1914)

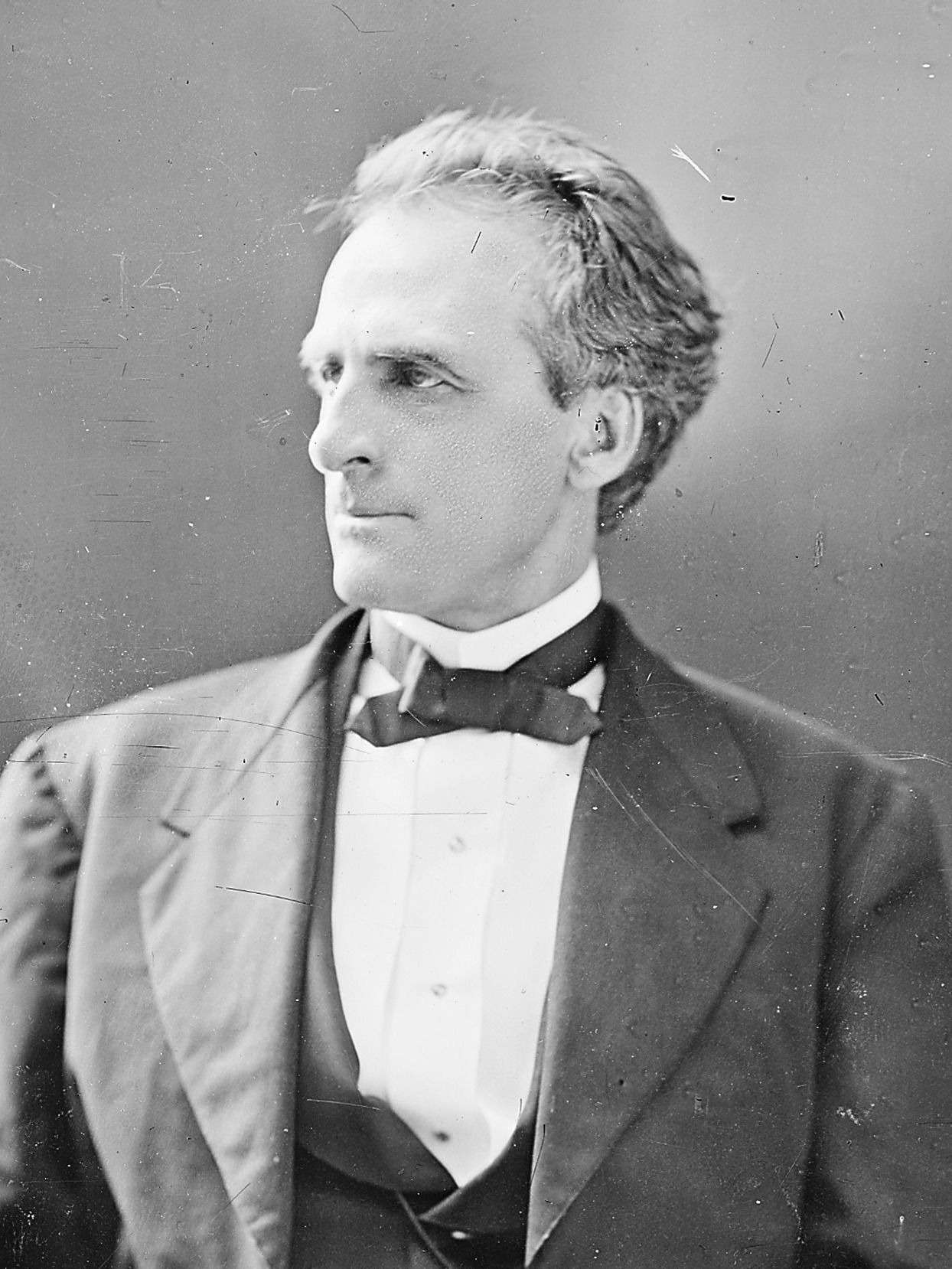

Member of the U.S. House of Representatives from Nevada's at-large district
- In office March 4, 1871 – March 3, 1875
- Preceded by: Thomas Fitch
- Succeeded by: William Woodburn

Member of the California State Assembly from the 12th district
- In office 1862–1863

Personal details
- Born: April 22, 1828 Searsmont, Maine, US
- Died: June 25, 1914 (aged 86) Mount Rainier, Maryland, US
- Party: Democratic
- Profession: Politician, Lawyer, Librarian, Editor, Proprietor, Miner

Charles West Kendall (April 22, 1828 – June 25, 1914) was an American politician, lawyer, librarian, editor, proprietor and miner in California, Nevada and Colorado.

== Biography ==
Charles West Kendall was born in Searsmont, Maine, on April 22, 1828. Kendall attended Phillips Academy and Yale College. He moved to California in 1849, where he engaged in mining. He became editor and proprietor of the San Jose Tribune from 1855 to 1859.

Kendall studied law and was admitted to the bar in 1859, after which he commenced a practice in Sacramento, California. He was a member of the California State Assembly in 1862 and 1863, representing Tuolumne and Mono counties, and then moved to Hamilton, Nevada, where he continued to practice law. Kendall was elected a Democrat to the United States House of Representatives in 1870, serving from 1871 to 1875, declining to be a candidate for renomination in 1874. Afterwards, he moved to Denver, Colorado, and resumed practicing law. He served as assistant librarian in the Interstate Commerce Commission in Washington, D.C., from 1892 until his death in Mount Rainier, Maryland, on June 25, 1914. Kendall was interred in Congressional Cemetery in Washington.

Political offices
Preceded by William M. Buell, Francis Sorrell	California State Assemblyman, 12th District; 1862–1863 (with B. K. Davis/Nelson M. Orr, Tim N. Machin)	Succeeded by Three members
U.S. House of Representatives
Preceded by Thomas Fitch	Member of the U.S. House of Representatives from Nevada's at-large congressional district 1871–1875	Succeeded by William Woodburn
