= Rollin M. Daggett =

American politician and diplomat

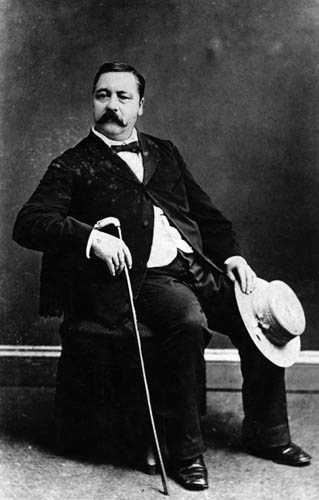

United States Minister to Hawaii
- In office August 21, 1882 – June 12, 1885
- President: Chester A. Arthur; Grover Cleveland
- Preceded by: James M. Comly
- Succeeded by: George W. Merrill

Member of the U.S. House of Representatives from Nevada's at-large district
- In office March 4, 1879 – March 3, 1881
- Preceded by: Thomas Wren
- Succeeded by: George Williams Cassidy

Personal details
- Born: February 22, 1831 Richville, New York, U.S.
- Died: November 12, 1901 (aged 70) San Francisco, California, U.S.
- Party: Republican

Rollin Mallory Daggett (February 22, 1831 – November 12, 1901) was a 19th-century American politician, minister, and diplomat. Daggett served a single term as a United States representative from Nevada from 1879 to 1881.

== Biography ==
Daggett was born on February 22, 1831, in Richville, St. Lawrence County, New York.

He had served in the Nevada Territorial Council. Later he was the United States Minister Resident to the Kingdom of Hawaii from 1882 to 1885. A member of the Sagebrush School, Daggett was also a writer.

He died on November 12, 1901, in San Francisco, California and was buried at Laurel Hill Cemetery (which is no longer open).

U.S. House of Representatives
Preceded by Thomas Wren	Member of the U.S. House of Representatives from Nevada's at-large congressional district 1879–1881	Succeeded by George Williams Cassidy
Diplomatic posts
Preceded by James M. Comly	United States Minister to Hawaii; 1882 – 1885	Succeeded by George W. Merrill
