= William Woodburn =

American politician

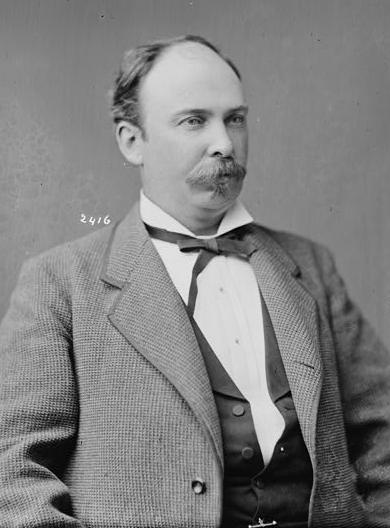

12th Attorney General of Nevada
- In office January 15, 1901 – January 5, 1903
- Governor: Reinhold Sadler
- Preceded by: William D. Jones
- Succeeded by: James G. Sweeney

Member of the U.S. House of Representatives from Nevada's at-large district
- In office March 4, 1885 – March 3, 1889
- Preceded by: George Williams Cassidy
- Succeeded by: Horace F. Bartine
- In office March 4, 1875 – March 3, 1877
- Preceded by: Charles West Kendall
- Succeeded by: Thomas Wren

Personal details
- Born: April 14, 1838 County Wicklow, Ireland
- Died: January 15, 1915 (aged 76) Carson City, Nevada, U.S.
- Party: Republican
- Profession: Attorney

William Woodburn (April 14, 1838 – January 15, 1915) was an American politician and a member of the United States House of Representatives from Nevada. He immigrated with his parents to the United States in 1849. He attended St. Charles College, Maryland, studied law, and was admitted to the bar in 1866. He commenced the practice of law in Virginia City, Nevada. In 1871 and 1872, he was the district attorney of Storey County, Nevada.

William Woodburn was elected as a Republican to the Forty-fourth Congress, which met from March 4, 1875, to March 3, 1877. He was later elected to the Forty-ninth and Fiftieth Congresses, and he served from March 4, 1885, to March 3, 1889. He resumed the practice of his profession in Virginia City, Nevada. He was an unsuccessful candidate for election in 1892 to the Fifty-third Congress. He was appointed Attorney General of Nevada by Governor Reinhold Sadler on January 15, 1901, succeeding William D. Jones who resigned to become a state district court judge. Woodburn served the remainder of Jones' term which expired in January 1903, and returned to private practice.

Woodburn died on January 15, 1915, in Carson City, Nevada. He was interred in St. Theresa Cemetery.

U.S. House of Representatives
Preceded by Charles West Kendall	Member of the U.S. House of Representatives from Nevada's at-large congressional district 1875–1877	Succeeded by Thomas Wren
Preceded by George Williams Cassidy	Member of the U.S. House of Representatives from Nevada's at-large congressional district 1885–1889	Succeeded by Horace F. Bartine
