= George A. Bartlett =

American politician (1869–1951)

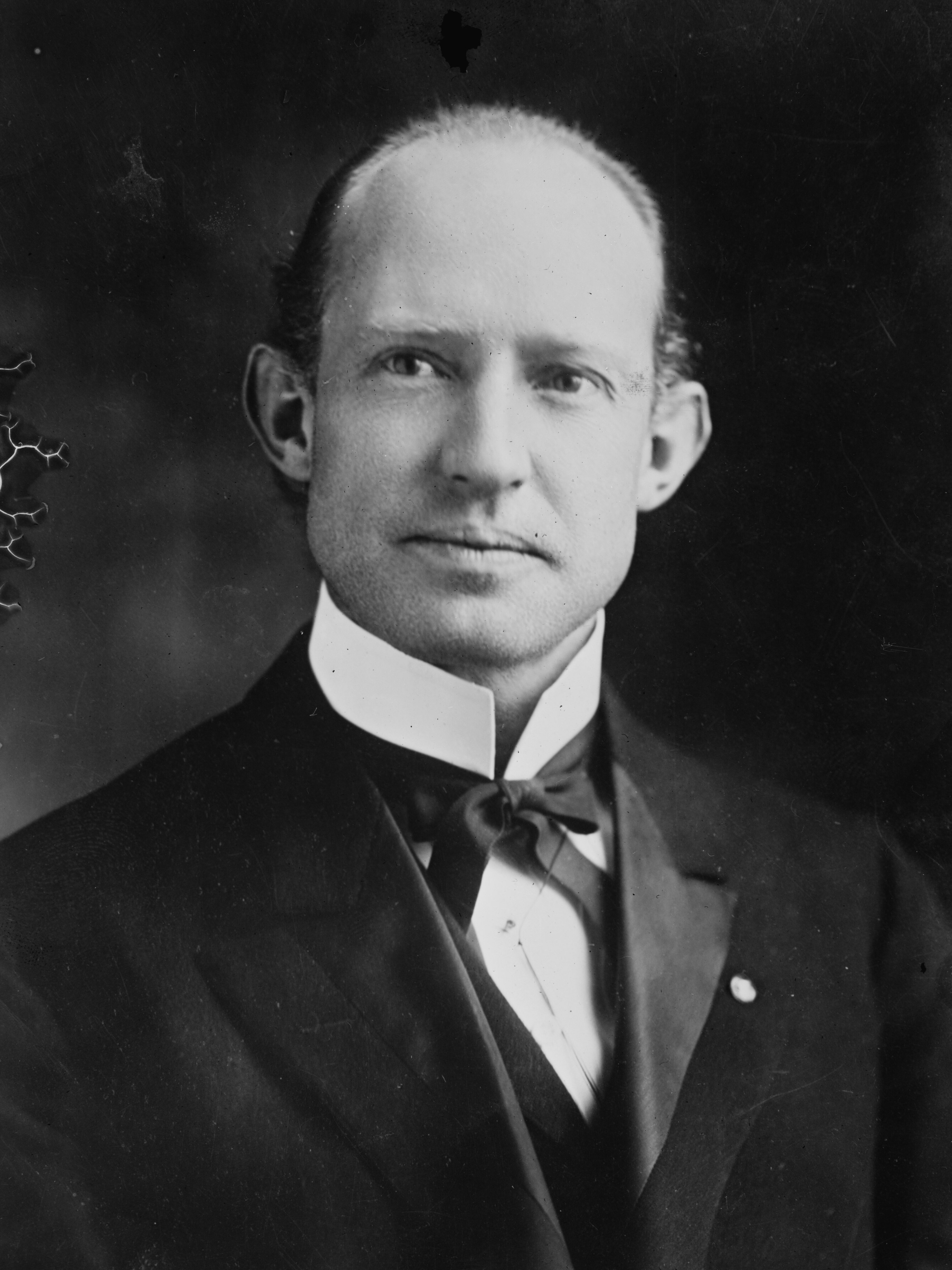

Member of the U.S. House of Representatives from Nevada's at-large district
- In office March 4, 1907 – March 3, 1911
- Preceded by: Clarence D. Van Duzer
- Succeeded by: Edwin E. Roberts

Personal details
- Born: November 30, 1869 San Francisco, California, U.S.
- Died: June 1, 1951 (aged 81) Reno, Nevada, U.S.
- Party: Democratic
- Profession: Attorney

George Arthur Bartlett (November 30, 1869 – June 1, 1951) was a United States representative from Nevada.

== Biography ==
He moved with his parents to Eureka, Eureka County and attended the common schools. His marriage to Pearl Bartlett resulted in four children, including pilot, editor, and poet Margaret Bartlett Thornton.

Bartlett received a law degree from Georgetown University in 1894 and was accepted to the Nevada bar. He served district attorney of Eureka County in 1889 and 1890. He was elected as a Democrat to the Sixtieth and Sixty-first Congresses (March 4, 1907 – March 3, 1911) and did not seek re-election in 1910.

After serving in Congress, he resumed the practice of law in Reno. He was appointed United States assistant district attorney for the District of Nevada on March 3, 1915, and served until March 30, 1918. Between 1918 and 1931 Bartlett served as a judge in the Nevada state court system, after which he resumed the private practice of law. During his time on the bench he granted over 20,000 divorces, including those for Jack Dempsey, Tallulah Bankhead, and W. K. Kellogg earning him the nickname "the divorce judge". He later wrote a book called Men, Women and Conflict based on this experience which was edited by his daughter Margaret. Published in 1931, it was re-issued in 1947 as Is Marriage Necessary?.

He authored several books and was interred in Mountain View Cemetery in Reno upon his death.

== See also ==
- George A. Bartlett House in Tonopah, Nevada

== Notes ==
U.S. House of Representatives
Preceded by Clarence D. Van Duzer	Member of the U.S. House of Representatives from Nevada's at-large congressional district 1907–1911	Succeeded by Edwin E. Roberts
