= Electoral history of Harry Reid =

List of elections featuring Harry Reid as a candidate

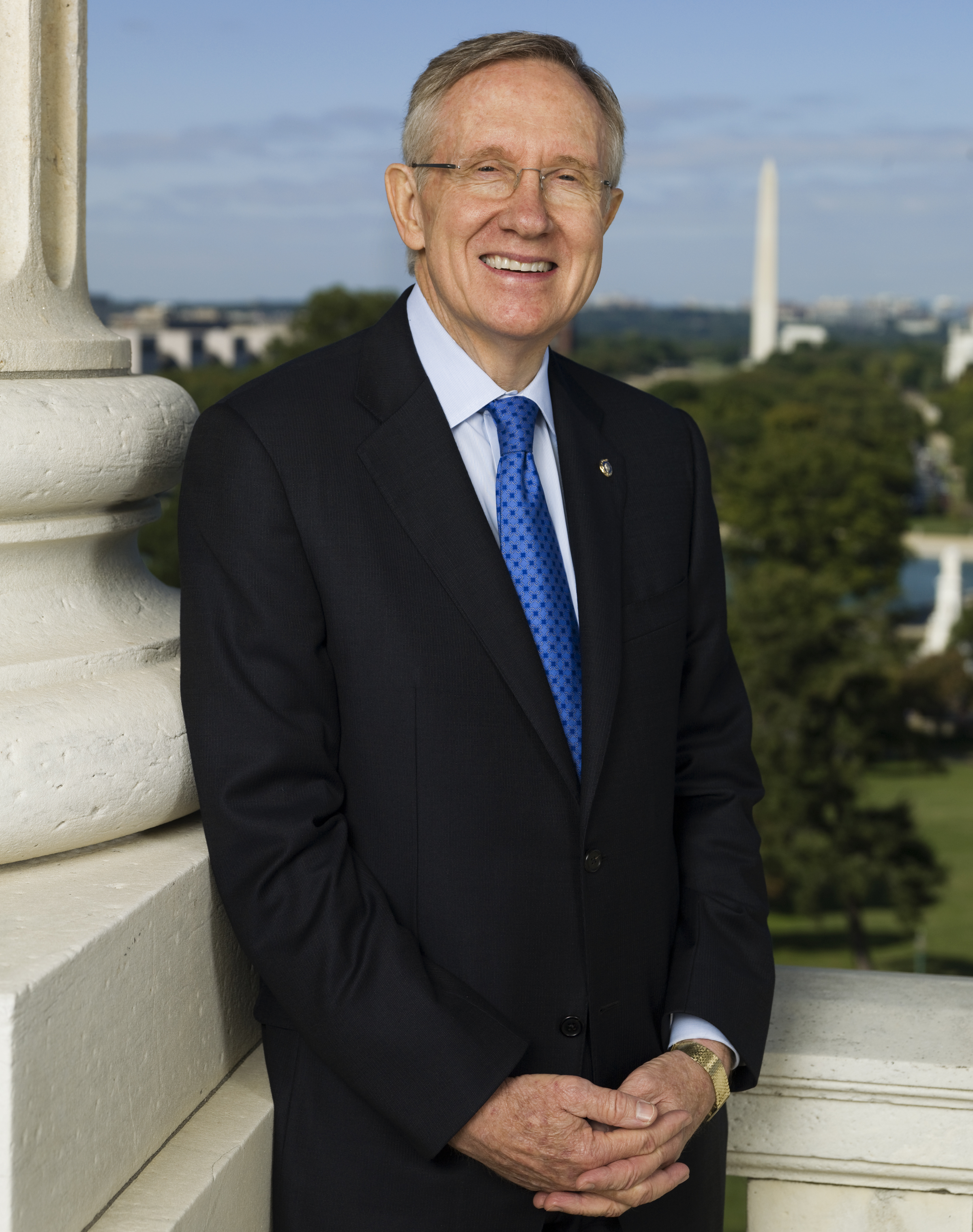
Senator Harry Reid (D-NV)

Harry Reid (d. 2021) was a former Democratic senior United States senator from Nevada (1987–2017), Senate Majority Leader (2007–2015), and Senate Minority Leader (2015-2017). Retiring in January 2017, he did not file to run in the 2016 Senate elections.

Reid previously served as a Senate Minority Leader (2005–2007), Senate Minority Whip (1999–2001, 2001 and 2003–2005), Senate Majority Whip (2001, 2001–2003), United States Representative (1983–1987) and Lieutenant Governor of Nevada (1971–1975).

== Nevada ==
Lieutenant Governor of Nevada, 1970, Democratic Primary:

- Harry Reid - 44,920 (82.15%)
- Lee Peer - 9,760 (17.85%)

Lieutenant Governor of Nevada, 1970:

- Harry Reid (D) – 78,994 (54.83%)
- Robert N. Broadbent (R) – 65,078 (45.17%)

== U.S. congressional elections ==
Nevada's 1st congressional district, 1982, Democratic Primary:

- Harry Reid - 41,786 (77.87%)
- None of the above - 4,248 (7.92%)
- D. A. Rolfe - 3,214 (5.99%)
- Ray Ford - 2,946 (5.49%)
- P.J. Brooks, Jr. - 1,468 (2.74%)

Nevada's 1st congressional district, 1982:

- Harry Reid (D) – 61,901 (57.54%)
- Peggy Cavnar (R) – 45,675 (42.46%)

Nevada's 1st congressional district, 1984:

- Harry Reid (D) (inc.) – 73,242 (56.12%)
- Peggy Cavnar (R) – 55,391 (42.44%)
- Joe Morris (LBT) – 1,885 (1.44%)

== U.S. Senate elections ==
Democratic primary for the United States Senate from Nevada, 1974:

- Harry Reid – 44,768 (58.62%)
- Maya Miller – 25,738 (33.70%)
- Dan Miller – 5,869 (7.68%)

United States Senate election in Nevada, 1974:

- Paul Laxalt (R) – 79,605 (46.97%)
- Harry Reid (D) – 78,981 (46.60%)
- Jack C. Doyle (Independent American) – 10,887 (6.42%)

Democratic primary for the United States Senate from Nevada, 1986:

- Harry Reid – 74,275 (82.71%)
- None of These Candidates – 8,486 (9.45%)
- Manny Beals – 7,039 (7.84%)

United States Senate election in Nevada, 1986:

- Harry Reid (D) – 130,955 (50.00%)
- James Santini (R) – 116,606 (44.52%)
- None of the Above – 9,472 (3.62%)
- H. Kent Cromwell (LBT) – 4,899 (1.87%)

Democratic primary for the United States Senate from Nevada, 1992:

- Harry Reid (inc.) – 64,828 (52.82%)
- Charles Woods – 48,364 (39.40%)
- None of These Candidates – 4,429 (3.61%)
- Norman E. Hollingsworth – 3,253 (2.65%)
- God Almighty (actually Emil Tolotti Jr.) – 1,869 (1.52%)

United States Senate election in Nevada, 1992:

- Harry Reid (D) (inc.) – 253,150 (51.05%)
- Demar Dahl (R) – 199,413 (40.21%)
- None of the Above – 13,154 (2.65%)
- Joe S. Garcia, Sr. (Independent American) – 11,240 (2.27%)
- Lois Avery (Natural Law) – 7,279 (1.47%)
- H. Kent Cromwell (LBT) – 7,222 (1.46%)
- Harry Tootle (Populist) – 4,429 (0.89%)

United States Senate election in Nevada, 1998:

- Harry Reid (D) (inc.) – 208,650 (47.88%)
- John Ensign (R) – 208,222 (47.78%)
- None of the Above – 8,125 (1.86%)
- Michael Cloud (LBT) – 8,044 (1.85%)
- Michael E. Williams (Natural Law) – 2,749 (0.63%)

United States Senate election in Nevada, 2004:

- Harry Reid (D) (inc.) – 494,805 (61.08%)
- Richard Ziser (R) – 284,640 (35.14%)
- None of the Above – 12,968 (1.60%)
- Tom Hurst (LBT) – 9,559 (1.18%)
- David K. Schumann (Independent American) – 6,001 (0.74%)
- Gary Marinch (Natural Law) – 2,095 (0.26%)

Democratic primary for the United States Senate from Nevada, 2010

- Harry Reid (inc.) - 87,366 (75.32%)
- None of these candidates - 12,335 (10.63%)
- Alex Miller - 9,715 (8.38%)
- Eduardo "Mr. Clean" Hamilton - 4,644 (4.00%)
- Carlo Poliak - 1,938 (1.67%)

United States Senate election in Nevada, 2010

- Harry Reid (D) (inc.) – 362,785 (50.29%)
- Sharron Angle (R) – 321,361 (44.55%)
- None of these candidates – 16,197 (2.25%)
- Scott Ashjian – 5,811 (0.81%)
- Michael Haines – 4,261 (0.59%)
- Tim Fasano – 3,185 (0.44%)
- Jesse Holland – 3,175 (0.44%)
- Jeffery Reeves – 2,510 (0.35%)
- Wil Stand – 2,119 (0.29%)

== Las Vegas mayoral election ==
Non-partisan primary for Mayor of Las Vegas, 1975

- Harry Reid - 8,471 (36.22%)
- William H. Briare - 5,316 (22.73%)
- Ronald P. "Ron" Lurie - 4,960 (21.21%)
- Henry H. "Hank" Thornley - 3,207 (13.71%)
- others - 1,432 (6.13%)

Non-partisan general election for Mayor of Las Vegas, 1975

- Harry Reid - 11,954 (47.4%)
- William H. Briare - 13,264 (52.6%)

== Leadership elections ==
Senate Democratic Leader (minority), 2004:

- Harry Reid – 45 (100%)

Senate Democratic Leader, 2006 (majority):

- Harry Reid (inc.) – 51 (100%)

Senate Democratic Leader, 2008 (majority):

- Harry Reid (inc.) – 57 (100%)

== Table ==
U.S. Senate elections in Nevada (Class III): Results 1974, 1986–2004 Nevada's 1st congressional district: Results 1982–1984
Year	Office	Democrat	Votes	Pct	Republican	Votes	Pct	3rd Party	Party	Votes	Pct	3rd Party	Party	Votes	Pct	3rd Party	Party	Votes	Pct	3rd Party	Party	Votes	Pct	3rd Party	Party	Votes	Pct
1974	Senate	Harry Reid	78,981	47%	Paul Laxalt	79,605	47%	Jack C. Doyle	Independent American	10,887	6%																
1982	House	Harry Reid	61,901	53%	Peggy Cavnar	55,391	47%																				
1984	House	Harry Reid	73,242	61%	Peggy Cavnar	45,675	38%	Joe Morris	Libertarian	1,885	2%																
1986	Senate	Harry Reid	130,955	50%	Jim Santini	116,606	45%	Kent Cromwell	Libertarian	4,899	2%	None of these *		9,472	4%												
1992	Senate	Harry Reid	253,150	51%	Demar Dahl	199,413	40%	Joe S. Garcia	Independent American	11,240	2%	Lois Avery	Natural Law	7,279	1%	Kent Cromwell	Libertarian	7,222	1%	Harry Tootle	Populist	4,429	1%	None of these *		13,154	3%
1998	Senate	Harry Reid	208,621	48%	John Ensign	208,220	48%	Michael Cloud	Libertarian	8,129	2%	Michael E. Williams	Natural Law	2,781	1%	None of these *		8,113	2%								
2004	Senate	Harry Reid	494,805	61%	Richard Ziser	284,640	35%	Thomas L. Hurst	Libertarian	9,559	1%	David K. Schumann	Independent American	6,001	1%	Gary Marinch	Natural Law	2,095	<1%	None of these *		12,968	2%				
2010	Senate	Harry Reid	362,785	50.3%	Sharron Angle	321,361	44.6%	None of these *		16,174	2.25%																

* Nevada law since 1975 allows dissatisfied voters to vote for "None of These Candidates."
