= 1970 United States House of Representatives election in Nevada =

1970 United States House election in Nevada
- November 3, 1970
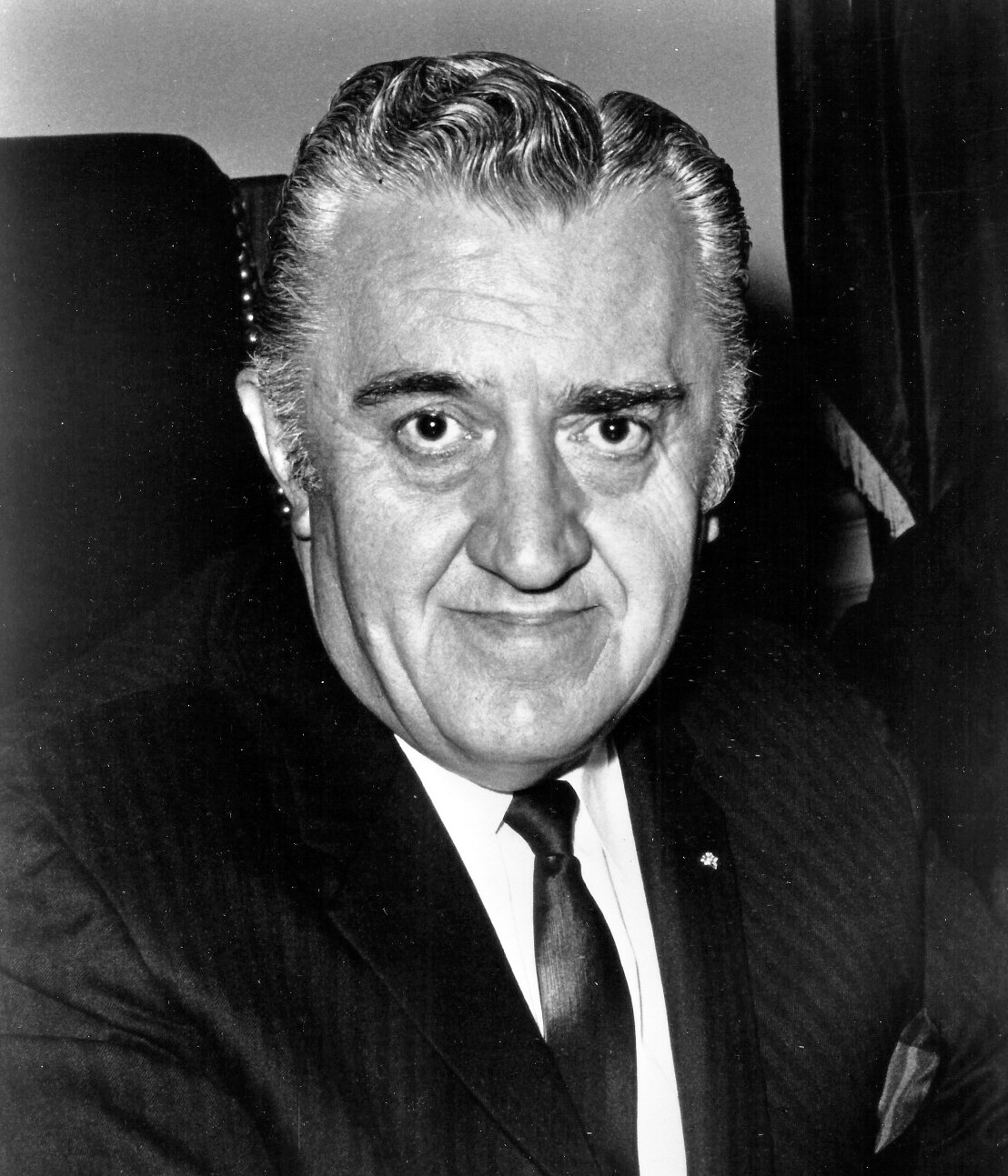

| Nominee | Walter S. Baring Jr. | J. Robert Charles |
| Party | Democratic | Republican |
| Popular vote | 113,496 | 24,147 |
| Percentage | 82.46% | 17.54% |
- County results Baring: 70–80% 80–90% >90%
Representative
At-large before election
Walter S. Baring Jr.
Democratic
Elected Representative
At-large
Walter S. Baring Jr.
Democratic

The 1970 United States House of Representatives election in Nevada was held on Tuesday November 3, 1970, to elect the state's at-large representative. Primary elections were held on September 1, 1970.

Incumbent Democrat Walter S. Baring Jr. who had represented the district consecutively since 1956 won re-election to an 8th consecutive term and 10th term non-consecutively. Baring won by the biggest margin in his entire career, winning two counties with over 90% of the vote. His margin of 64.91% would only be beaten by Jim Santini in 1976. This would be his last term in congress due to his loss in the 1972 primary.

== Democratic primary ==
=== Candidates ===
- Walter S. Baring Jr., Incumbent representative
- Otto Ravenholt

=== Results ===
Democratic primary results
| Party | Candidate | Votes | % |
|---|---|---|---|
| Democratic | Walter S. Baring Jr. (Incumbent) | 41,925 | 68.72 |
| Democratic | Richard E. Ham | 19,086 | 32.05 |
| Total votes | | 61,011 | 100.00 |

== Republican primary ==
=== Candidates ===
- J. Robert Charles
- Betty L. Victoria

=== Results ===
Republican primary results
| Party | Candidate | Votes | % |
|---|---|---|---|
| Republican | J. Robert Charles | 17,057 | 76.94 |
| Republican | Betty L. Victoria | 5,111 | 23.06 |
| Total votes | | 22,168 | 100.00 |

== General election ==
=== Candidates ===
- Walter S. Baring Jr.
- James M. Slattery

=== Results ===
General election results
| Party | Candidate | Votes | % |
|---|---|---|---|
| Democratic | Walter S. Baring Jr. (Incumbent) | 113,496 | 82.46% |
| Republican | J. Robert Charles | 24,147 | 17.54% |
| Total votes | | 137,643 | 100.00% |
| Democratic hold | | | |
