= 1974 United States House of Representatives election in Nevada =

1974 United States House election in Nevada
- November 5, 1974
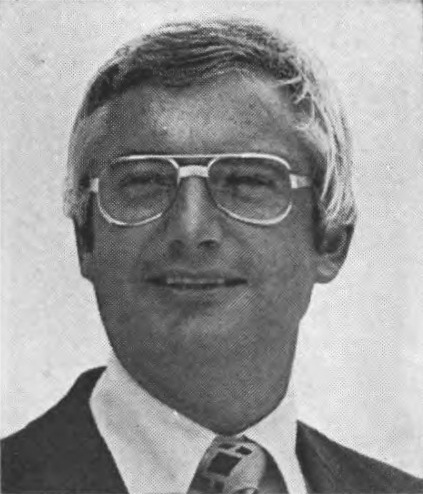

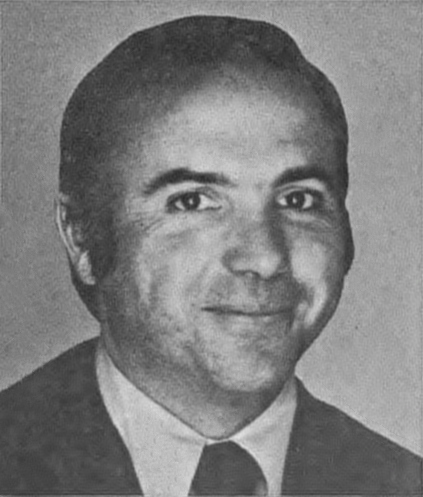

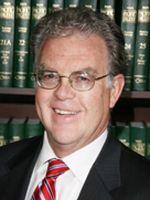
Nominee	Jim Santini	David Towell	Joel F. Hansen
Party	Democratic	Republican	Independent American
Popular vote	93,665	61,182	13,119
Percentage	55.76%	36.43%	7.81%
- County results Santini: 40–50% 50–60% 60–70% Towell: 40–50% 50–60%
Representative
At-large before election
David Towell
Republican
Elected Representative
At-large
James David Santini
Democratic

The 1974 United States House of Representatives election in Nevada was held on Tuesday November 5, 1974, to elect the state's at-large representative. Primary elections were held on September 3, 1974.

Democratic nominee James David Santini defeated incumbent Republican David Towell and Independent American Joel F. Hansen by 19.33%.

== Democratic primary ==
- Oscar E. Brooks
- Richard L. Gerish
- Myron E. Leavitt, former mayor of Las Vegas
- James David Santini

=== Results ===
Democratic primary results
Party	Candidate	Votes	%
Democratic	James David Santini	39,345	52.21
Democratic	Myron E. Leavitt	29,211	39.83
Democratic	Oscar E. Brooks	3,088	4.21
Democratic	Richard L. Gerish	1,694	2.31
Total votes		73,338	100.00

== Republican primary ==
- Jim Burns
- Curk Cave
- David Towell, incumbent representative

=== Results ===
Republican primary results
Party	Candidate	Votes	%
Republican	David Towell (incumbent)	35,227	87.31
Republican	Curk Cave	2,693	6.67
Republican	Jim Burns	2,428	6.02
Total votes		40,348	100.00

=== Results ===
General election results
Party	Candidate	Votes	%
Democratic	James David Santini	93,665	55.76%
Republican	David Towell (incumbent)	61,182	36.43%
Independent American	Joel F. Hansen	13,119	7.81%
Total votes		167,966	100.00%
Democratic gain from Republican			
