= Barbara Vucanovich =

American politician (1921–2013)

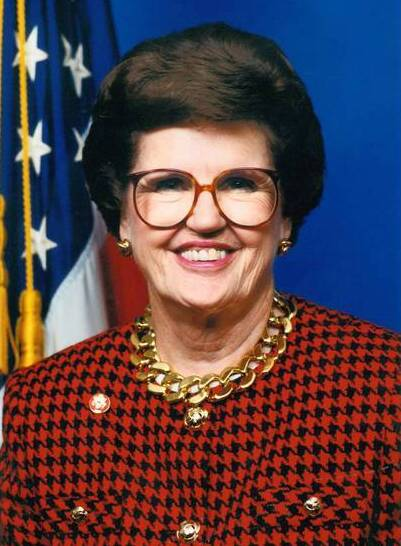

Secretary of the House Republican Conference
- In office January 3, 1995 – January 3, 1997
- Leader: Newt Gingrich
- Preceded by: Tom DeLay
- Succeeded by: Jennifer Dunn

Member of the U.S. House of Representatives from Nevada's 2nd district
- In office January 3, 1983 – January 3, 1997
- Preceded by: James Santini (at-large)
- Succeeded by: Jim Gibbons

Personal details
- Born: Barbara Farrell; June 22, 1921 Camp Dix, New Jersey, U.S.
- Died: June 10, 2013 (aged 91) Reno, Nevada, U.S.
- Party: Republican
- Spouses: Henry Bugden (m. 1939; div. 1949); Kenneth Dillon (m. 1950; died 1964); George Vucanovich (m. 1965; died 1998)
- Children: 5
- Education: Manhattanville College (attended)
- Vucanovich's voice Vucanovich on her bill to recognize National Barrier Awareness Day. Recorded February 27, 1986

Barbara Farrell Vucanovich (née Farrell; June 22, 1921 – June 10, 2013) was an American Republican politician from Nevada. She was the first woman from Nevada elected to the United States House of Representatives, in which she served seven terms representing Nevada from 1983 to 1997.

== Background ==
Barbara Farrell was born in Camp Dix, New Jersey, on June 22, 1921. Her father, Thomas Farrell, who hailed from Troy, New York, was of Irish ancestry. Between the world wars he was the chief engineer for the New York State Department of Public Works, and during World War II rejoined the United States Army to become Deputy Commanding General of the Manhattan Project. Her mother, Maria Ynez White, was of English and Mexican-Californio ancestry from southern California, with her maternal great-grandmother having been a Mexican who became a U.S. citizen upon the transfer of California to the United States in 1848.

=== Early life and marriage ===
Farrell grew up in the capital city of Albany, New York. She married James Henry Bugden at the age of 18 but became separated when her husband was assigned overseas during the war. She was employed by several New York businesses during the 1940s. In 1949, she relocated to Reno, Nevada, for what was intended to a brief period, so she could legally dissolve her first marriage under the city's famously lax divorce laws. However, while there, she met Kenneth Dillon, a local lawyer who was the founding partner in the law firm Vargas, Dillon, and Bartlett. They married the following year and had five children: Patricia, Michael, Kenneth, Thomas, and Susan. Widowed in 1964, she married George Vucanovich in 1965. They met while working on Paul Laxalt's unsuccessful campaign in 1964 for the U.S. Senate. George died of leukemia in 1998.

== Political career ==
Vucanovich's second husband, Ken Dillon, introduced her to Nevada Republican politics in the 1950s, when the party was slowly building after decades of minority status. Dillon introduced her to Paul Laxalt, then a young district attorney from Carson City. After working on Laxalt's gubernatorial campaigns and his razor-close win in the senatorial election over Democrat Harry Reid in 1974, Vucanovich was hired as the district director for the newly elected Senator. When Nevada was split into two congressional districts after the 1980 United States census, Laxalt urged Vucanovich to run for the 2nd District, which included the entire state outside of Las Vegas.

=== Congress ===
She won her first term with the slogan, "What Congress needs is a tough grandmother." Her tenure extended from 1983 until her retirement in 1997. She faced serious opposition once, in 1992, when Bill Clinton won the electoral votes of Nevada over George Herbert Walker Bush, Vucanovich's choice. She won just 48% of the vote to 43% to Reno mayor Pete Sferrazza. Shortly after taking office in 1983, she was diagnosed with and had surgery for breast cancer. Motivated in part by her own experience, Vucanovich supported funding for early screening, detection and treatment of breast cancer. She supported equal pay and equal treatment for women. She was a supporter of capital punishment.

Vucanovich served for many years on the House Interior Committee, of which she eventually became the ranking Republican on the Mining and Minerals Subcommittee. She also served on the House Administration Committee until her appointment in 1991 to the Appropriations Committee. She became Chairwoman of the Subcommittee on Military Construction when the Republicans gained control of the House of Representatives in 1995. Vucanovich authored the repeal of the 55 mph speed limit, particularly popular in the American West and a measure to prevent more than one state from taxing pensions and retirement benefits. She campaigned for her seventh term by opposing Clinton administration tax increase proposals on casinos.

She launched a campaign to become Secretary of the Republican Conference shortly after Congressman Bob Michel announced he would not seek another term. Michel's retirement created several vacancies in the Republican leadership as Newt Gingrich of Georgia and others jockeyed for higher positions. Despite having been a member of the Conservative Opportunity Society, a group led by subsequent Speaker Gingrich with the goal of achieving Republican control of the House, Vucanovich faced serious opposition in her leadership bid from Tim Hutchinson, a second-term member from Arkansas. She prevailed in a close contest for secretary after a rousing nomination speech by Henry Hyde (R-IL), a friend and ally in their shared opposition to abortion.

Vucanovich positioned herself early in her House career as a conservative leader, having aligned herself with a group of members such as Newt Gingrich, Bob Walker and Vin Weber who were not content with minority status. She helped draft two of the ten bills that were part of the Contract with America. She served on the Presidential Debate Commission from 1987 to 1997.

== Retirement ==
After her retirement from elected office, Vucanovich continued to work in politics, mainly serving on external committees. Her daughter, Patricia Dillon Cafferata, has served as Nevada State Treasurer, in the Nevada Assembly, and as District Attorney in three Nevada counties, and is her mother's official biographer.

== Death and tribute ==
Vucanovich died at a care facility in Reno on June 10, 2013, at the age of 91.

Governor Brian Sandoval paid tribute to Vucanovich, whom he likened to Margaret Thatcher, who was nicknamed the Iron Lady: "Barbara Vucanovich was the matriarch of her political generation ... Nevada's "Silver Lady". ... First and foremost, however, Barbara was a wife, mother, grandmother and great-grandmother. Her family was always her priority, even as she served the entire Nevada family in the United States Congress".

== Electoral results ==
1982 election
Party	Candidate	Votes	%
Republican	Barbara Vucanovich	70,188	55.49
Democratic	Mary Gojack	52,265	41.32
Libertarian	Teresa Vuceta	4,043	3.20
Total votes		126,496	100.0
Republican win (new seat)			

1984 election
Party	Candidate	Votes	%
Republican	Barbara Vucanovich (Incumbent)	99,775	71.21
Democratic	Andrew Barbano	36,130	25.79
Libertarian	Dan Becan	4,201	3.00
Total votes		140,106	100.0
Republican hold			

1986 election
Party	Candidate	Votes	%
Republican	Barbara Vucanovich (Incumbent)	83,479	58.41
Democratic	Pete Sferrazza	59,433	41.59
Total votes		142,912	100.0
Republican hold			

1988 election
Party	Candidate	Votes	%
Republican	Barbara Vucanovich (Incumbent)	105,981	57.26
Democratic	Jim Spoo	75,163	40.61
Libertarian	Kent Cromwell	3,953	2.14
Total votes		185,097	100.0
Republican hold			

1990 election
Party	Candidate	Votes	%
Republican	Barbara Vucanovich (Incumbent)	103,508	59.08
Democratic	Jane Wisdom	59,581	34.01
Libertarian	Dan Becan	12,120	6.92
Total votes		175,209	100.0
Republican hold			

1992 election
Party	Candidate	Votes	%
Republican	Barbara Vucanovich (Incumbent)	129,575	47.91
Democratic	Pete Sferrazza	117,199	43.33
Independent American	Daniel M. Hansen	13,285	4.91
Libertarian	Dan Becan	7,552	2.79
Populist	Don Golden	2,850	1.05
Total votes		270,461	100.0
Republican hold			

1994 election
Party	Candidate	Votes	%
Republican	Barbara Vucanovich (Incumbent)	142,202	63.50
Democratic	Janet Greeson	65,390	29.20
Independent American	Thomas F. Jefferson	9,615	4.29
Natural Law	Lois Avery	6,725	3.00
Total votes		223,932	100.0
Republican hold			

== See also ==
- List of Hispanic and Latino Americans in the United States Congress
- Women in the United States House of Representatives

U.S. House of Representatives
Preceded by James Santini; At-Large	Member of the U.S. House of Representatives from Nevada's 2nd congressional district 1983–1997	Succeeded by Jim Gibbons
Party political offices
Preceded by Tom DeLay	Secretary of the House Republican Conference; 1995–1997	Succeeded by Jennifer Dunn
