= 1976 United States Senate election in Nevada =

- November 2, 1976
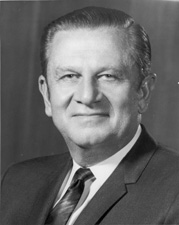

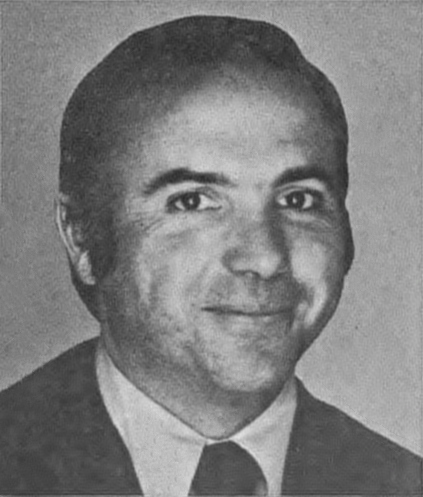
Nominee	Howard Cannon	David Towell
Party	Democratic	Republican
Popular vote	127,214	63,471
Percentage	63.01%	31.44%
- County results Cannon: 40–50% 50–60% 60–70% 70–80% Towell: 40–50%
U.S. senator before election
Howard Cannon
Democratic
Elected U.S. Senator
Howard Cannon
Democratic

The 1976 United States Senate election in Nevada was held on November 2, 1976. Incumbent Democratic U.S. Senator Howard Cannon won re-election to a fourth term despite Republican President Gerald Ford winning the state in the concurrent presidential election in Nevada.

== General election ==
=== Candidates ===
- Dan Becan (Libertarian)
- Howard Cannon, incumbent U.S. Senator (Democratic)
- David Towell, former U.S. Representative from Nevada's At-large congressional district (Republican)
- Byron D. Young (Independent American)

=== Campaign ===
In the Senate, Cannon was known as a moderate in the Democratic Party. He served as chairman of several committees, including the rules committee and the inaugural arrangements committee. Cannon was nearly defeated for re-election in 1964 by Republican Lieutenant Governor Paul Laxalt in one of the closest elections in history. However, he became more popular over the next few years and won re-election in 1970 with nearly 58% of the vote. In 1976, he faced former U.S. Representative David Towell, who served just one term in the U.S. House of Representatives before losing reelection, then running for the Senate. Cannon won re-election with 63% of the vote, one of his best election performances of his career. He won every county in the state, except for Eureka County, which Towell won with just 51% of the vote.

=== Results ===
General election results
Party	Candidate	Votes	%	±%
Democratic	Howard Cannon (incumbent)	127,214	63.01%	+5.36%
Republican	David Towell	63,471	31.44%	−9.73%
None of These Candidates		5,288	2.62%	
Independent American	Byron D. Young	3,619	1.79%	
Libertarian	Dan Becan	2,307	1.14%	
Majority		63,743	31.57%	+15.09%
Turnout		201,899		
Democratic hold		Swing		

== See also ==
- 1976 United States Senate elections
