= 1972 United States House of Representatives election in Nevada =

1972 United States House election in Nevada
- November 7, 1972
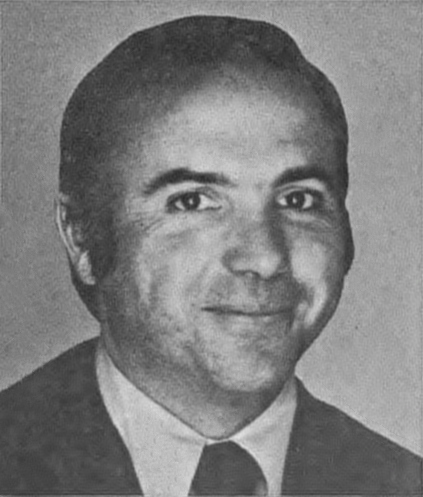

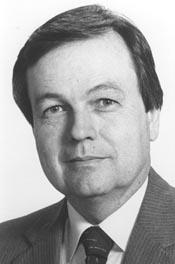
Nominee	David Towell	James Bilbray
Party	Republican	Democratic
Popular vote	94,113	86,349
Percentage	52.15%	47.85%
- County results Towell: 50–60% 60–70% Bilbray: 50–60%
Representative
at-large before election
Walter S. Baring Jr.
Democratic
Elected Representative
at-large
David Towell
Republican

The 1972 United States House of Representatives election in Nevada was held on Tuesday November 7, 1972, to elect the state's at-large representative. Primary elections were held on September 5, 1972.

Republican nominee David Towell won the general election with 52.15% of the vote. Incumbent Representative Walter S. Baring Jr. lost the Democratic primary election 52-47. Baring endorsed Towell, helping him win the general election.

== Democratic primary ==
Democratic primary: Bilbray: 40–50%; 50–60%; Baring: 50–60%; 60–70%; 70–80%

=== Candidates ===
- Walter S. Baring Jr., incumbent representative
- James Bilbray, U.S. Army veteran

=== Background ===
Conservative Democrat Baring was criticized by the more liberal wing of the Democratic Party for voting against the Civil Rights Act of 1964. The primaries were typically more competitive than the general election for Baring. He typically got high margins in Nevada's rural "cow counties" (14 counties apart from Clark, Washoe, and Carson City). However, the massive growth in Clark County and Washoe County made it significantly more difficult for Baring to win.

=== Results ===
Democratic primary results
Party	Candidate	Votes	%
Democratic	James Bilbray	36,525	52.21
Democratic	Walter S. Baring Jr. (incumbent)	31,896	45.60
Total votes		68,421	100.00

== Republican primary ==
Republican primary: Towell: 30–40%; 40–50%; 50–60%; 60–70%; 70–80%; Byrnes: 30–40%; 40–50%; 50–60%

=== Candidates ===
- William T. Byrnes
- Robert J. Edwards
- Wayne Goodin
- V.M. Markoff
- David Towell

=== Results ===
Republican primary results
Party	Candidate	Votes	%
Republican	David Towell	13,453	41.50
Republican	William T. Byrnes	11,764	36.29
Republican	Robert J. Edwards	2,763	8.53
Republican	Wayne Goodin	2,411	7.44
Republican	V.M. Markoff	2,029	6.26
Total votes		32,420	100.00

== General Election ==
General election results
Party	Candidate	Votes	%
Republican	David Towell	94,113	52.15%
Democratic	James Bilbray	86,349	47.85%
Total votes		180,462	100.00%
Republican gain from Democratic			
