= Nevada's at-large congressional district =

Obsolete U.S. House district in Nevada

- Obsolete district
- Created: 1864
- Eliminated: 1980
- Years active: 1864-1983

Nevada's at-large congressional district was created when Nevada was granted statehood in 1864, encompassing the entire state. It existed until 1983, when it eliminated as a result of the redistricting cycle after the 1980 census and subsequent reapportionment in which Nevada was awarded a second seat in the House of Representatives. Nevada began electing two representatives from separate districts commencing with the election of 1982 and the 98th Congress.

== List of members representing the district ==
Member	Party	Years	Cong ress	Electoral history
District established October 31, 1864
Henry G. Worthington (Austin)	Republican	October 31, 1864 – March 3, 1865	38th	Elected October 31, 1864. Lost renomination.
Delos R. Ashley (Austin)	Republican	March 4, 1865 – March 3, 1869	39th 40th	Elected late November 7, 1865. Re-elected in 1866. Retired.
Thomas Fitch (Belmont)	Republican	March 4, 1869 – March 3, 1871	41st	Elected in 1868. Lost re-election.
Charles West Kendall (Hamilton)	Democratic	March 4, 1871 – March 3, 1875	42nd 43rd	Elected in 1870. Re-elected in 1872. Retired.
William Woodburn (Virginia City)	Republican	March 4, 1875 – March 3, 1877	44th	Elected in 1874. [data missing]
Thomas Wren (Eureka)	Republican	March 4, 1877 – March 3, 1879	45th	Elected in 1876. [data missing]
Rollin M. Daggett (Virginia City)	Republican	March 4, 1879 – March 3, 1881	46th	Elected in 1878. Lost re-election.
George Williams Cassidy (Eureka)	Democratic	March 4, 1881 – March 3, 1885	47th 48th	Elected in 1880. Re-elected in 1882. Lost re-election.
William Woodburn (Virginia City)	Republican	March 4, 1885 – March 3, 1889	49th 50th	Elected in 1884. Re-elected in 1886. Retired.
Horace F. Bartine (Carson City)	Republican	March 4, 1889 – March 3, 1893	51st 52nd	Elected in 1888. Re-elected in 1890. Retired.
Francis G. Newlands (Reno)	Silver	March 4, 1893 – March 3, 1903	53rd 54th 55th 56th 57th	Elected in 1892. Re-elected in 1894. Re-elected in 1896. Re-elected in 1898. Re-elected in 1900. Retired to run for U.S. senator.
Clarence D. Van Duzer (Tonopah)	Democratic	March 4, 1903 – March 3, 1907	58th 59th	Elected in 1902. Re-elected in 1904. Retired.
George A. Bartlett (Tonopah)	Democratic	March 4, 1907 – March 3, 1911	60th 61st	Elected in 1906. Re-elected in 1908. Retired.
Edwin E. Roberts (Carson City)	Republican	March 4, 1911 – March 3, 1919	62nd 63rd 64th 65th	Elected in 1910. Re-elected in 1912. Re-elected in 1914. Re-elected in 1916. Retired to run for U.S. senator.
Charles R. Evans (Goldfield)	Democratic	March 4, 1919 – March 3, 1921	66th	Elected in 1918. Lost re-election.
Samuel S. Arentz (Simpson)	Republican	March 4, 1921 – March 3, 1923	67th	Elected in 1920. Retired to run for U.S. Senator.
Charles L. Richards (Reno)	Democratic	March 4, 1923 – March 3, 1925	68th	Elected in 1922. Lost re-election.
Samuel S. Arentz (Simpson)	Republican	March 4, 1925 – March 3, 1933	69th 70th 71st 72nd	Elected in 1924. Re-elected in 1926. Re-elected in 1928. Re-elected in 1930. Lost re-election.
James G. Scrugham (Reno)	Democratic	March 4, 1933 – December 7, 1942	73rd 74th 75th 76th 77th	Elected in 1932. Re-elected in 1934. Re-elected in 1936. Re-elected in 1938. Re-elected in 1940. Retired to run for U.S. senator. Resigned when elected U.S. senator.
Vacant		December 7, 1942 – January 3, 1943	77th	
Maurice J. Sullivan (Reno)	Democratic	January 3, 1943 – January 3, 1945	78th	Elected in 1942. Lost renomination.
Berkeley L. Bunker (Las Vegas)	Democratic	January 3, 1945 – January 3, 1947	79th	Elected in 1944. Retired to run for U.S. senator.
Charles H. Russell (Ely)	Republican	January 3, 1947 – January 3, 1949	80th	Elected in 1946. Lost re-election.
Walter S. Baring Jr. (Reno)	Democratic	January 3, 1949 – January 3, 1953	81st 82nd	Elected in 1948. Re-elected in 1950. Lost re-election.
Clarence Clifton Young (Reno)	Republican	January 3, 1953 – January 3, 1957	83rd 84th	Elected in 1952. Re-elected in 1954. Retired to run for U.S. senator.
Walter S. Baring Jr. (Reno)	Democratic	January 3, 1957 – January 3, 1973	85th 86th 87th 88th 89th 90th 91st 92nd	Elected in 1956. Re-elected in 1958. Re-elected in 1960. Re-elected in 1962. Re-elected in 1964. Re-elected in 1966. Re-elected in 1968. Re-elected in 1970. Lost renomination.
David Towell (Gardnerville)	Republican	January 3, 1973 – January 3, 1975	93rd	Elected in 1972. Lost re-election.
James David Santini (Las Vegas)	Democratic	January 3, 1975 – January 3, 1983	94th 95th 96th 97th	Elected in 1974. Re-elected in 1976. Re-elected in 1978. Re-elected in 1980. Retired to run for U.S. senator.
District eliminated January 3, 1983
