= 1968 United States House of Representatives election in Nevada =

1968 United States House election in Nevada
- November 5, 1968
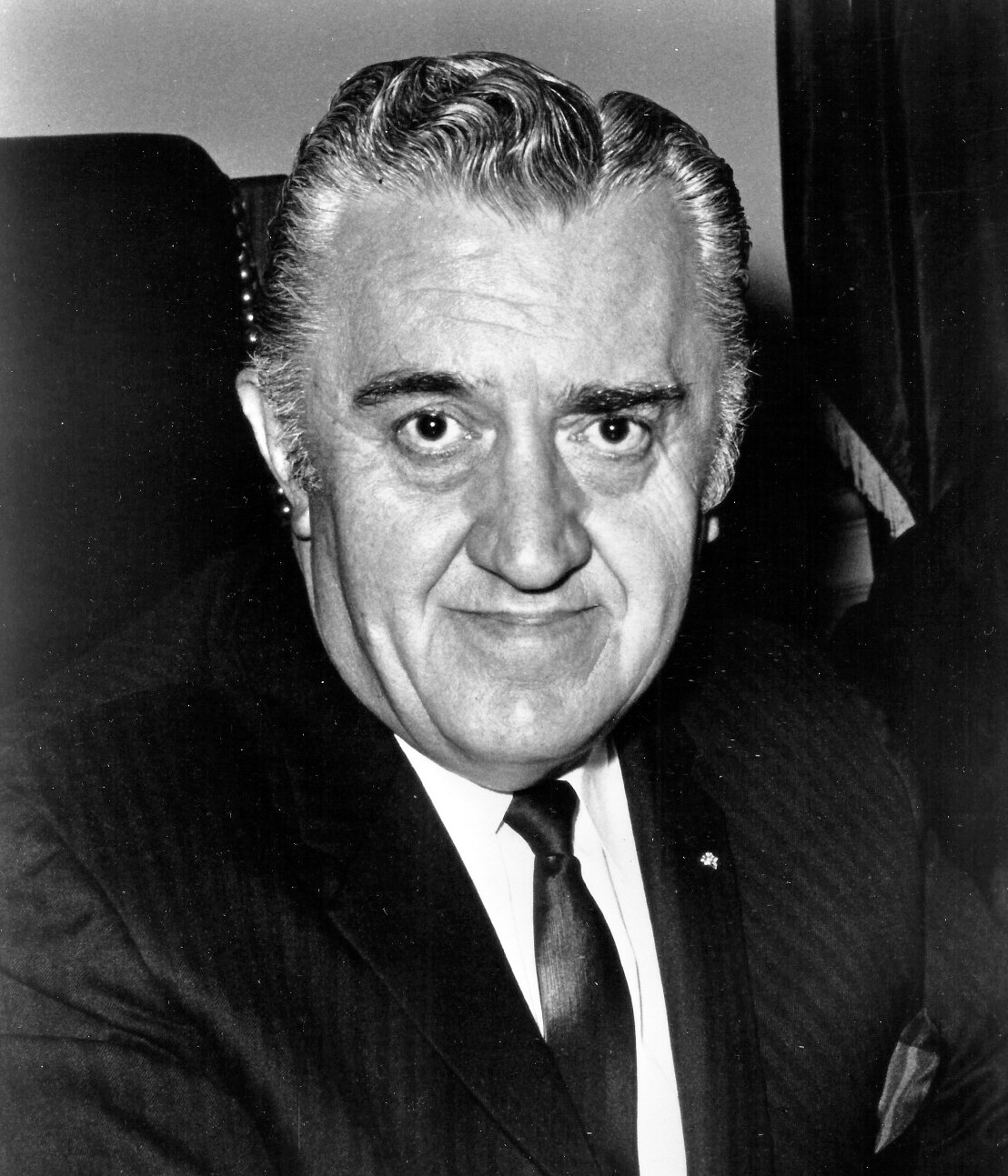

Nominee	Walter S. Baring Jr.	James M. Slattery
Party	Democratic	Republican
Popular vote	104,136	40,209
Percentage	72.1%	27.9%
- County results Baring: 60–70% 70–80% 80–90%
Representative
At-large before election
Walter S. Baring Jr.
Democratic
Elected Representative
At-large
Walter S. Baring Jr.
Democratic

The 1968 United States House of Representatives election in Nevada was held on Tuesday November 5, 1968, to elect the state's at-large representative. This election occurred during the 1968 United States presidential election. Incumbent Democrat, Walter S. Baring Jr. won re-election to a ninth term in congress by a landslide margin of 44.29% winning every county in the state with over 60% of the vote.

Primary elections were held on September 3, 1968.

== Democratic primary ==
=== Candidates ===
- Walter S. Baring Jr.
- Richard E. Ham

=== Results ===
Democratic primary results
Party	Candidate	Votes	%
Democratic	Walter S. Baring Jr. (Incumbent)	40,938	67.95
Democratic	Richard E. Ham	19,306	32.05
Total votes		60,244	100.00

== Republican primary ==
=== Candidates ===
- James M. Slattery
- Clyde Mathews

=== Results ===
Republican primary results
Party	Candidate	Votes	%
Republican	James M. Slattery	19,694	61.38
Republican	Clyde Mathews	12,394	38.62
Total votes		32,088	100.00

== General election ==
=== Candidates ===
- Walter S. Baring Jr.
- James M. Slattery

=== Results ===
General election results
Party	Candidate	Votes	%
Democratic	Walter S. Baring Jr. (Incumbent)	104,136	72.14%
Republican	James M. Slattery	40,209	27.86%
Total votes		144,345	100.00%
Democratic hold			
