= 1970 Nevada lieutenant gubernatorial election =

- November 3, 1970
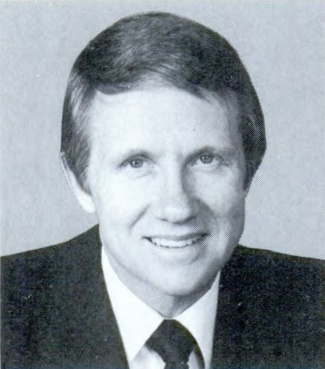

Nominee	Harry Reid	Robert N. Broadbent
Party	Democratic	Republican
Popular vote	78,994	65,078
Percentage	54.83%	45.17%
- County results Reid: 50–60% 60–70% Broadbent: 50–60% 60–70%
Lieutenant Governor before election
Edward Fike
Republican
Elected Lieutenant Governor
Harry Reid
Democratic

The 1970 Nevada lieutenant gubernatorial election was held on November 3, 1970, to elect the lieutenant governor of Nevada. Primaries were held on September 1, 1970. Republican incumbent Edward Fike chose to unsuccessfully run for governor rather than seek another term. Democratic Nevada State Assemblyman Harry Reid won the election, defeating Republican former mayor of Boulder City Robert N. Broadbent by nine percentage points.

== Republican primary ==
=== Candidates ===
- Robert N. Broadbent, former mayor of Boulder City (1967–1968), (1960–1961)
- Richard Blackburn "Dick" Taylor, businessman

=== Results ===
Republican primary results
Party	Candidate	Votes	%
Republican	Robert N. Broadbent	25,386	78.85%
Republican	Richard Blackburn "Dick" Taylor	6,931	21.45%
Total votes		32,317	100.00%

== Democratic primary ==
=== Candidates ===
- Harry Reid, Nevada State Assemblyman (1969–1971)
- Lee Peer

=== Results ===
Democratic primary results
Party	Candidate	Votes	%
Democratic	Harry Reid	44,920	82.15%
Democratic	Lee Peer	9,760	17.85%
Total votes		54,680	100.00%

== General election ==
=== Candidates ===
- Harry Reid, Nevada State Assemblyman (1969–1971) (Democratic)
- Robert N. Broadbent, former mayor of Boulder City (1967–1968), (1960–1961) (Republican)

=== Results ===
1970 Nevada lieutenant gubernatorial election results
Party	Candidate	Votes	%	±%
Democratic	Harry Reid	78,994	54.83%	+7.79%
Republican	Robert N. Broadbent	65,078	45.17%	−7.79%
Majority		13,916	9.66%	
Total votes		144,072	100.00%	
Democratic gain from Republican				
