= 1966 United States House of Representatives election in Nevada =

1966 United States House election in Nevada
- November 8, 1966
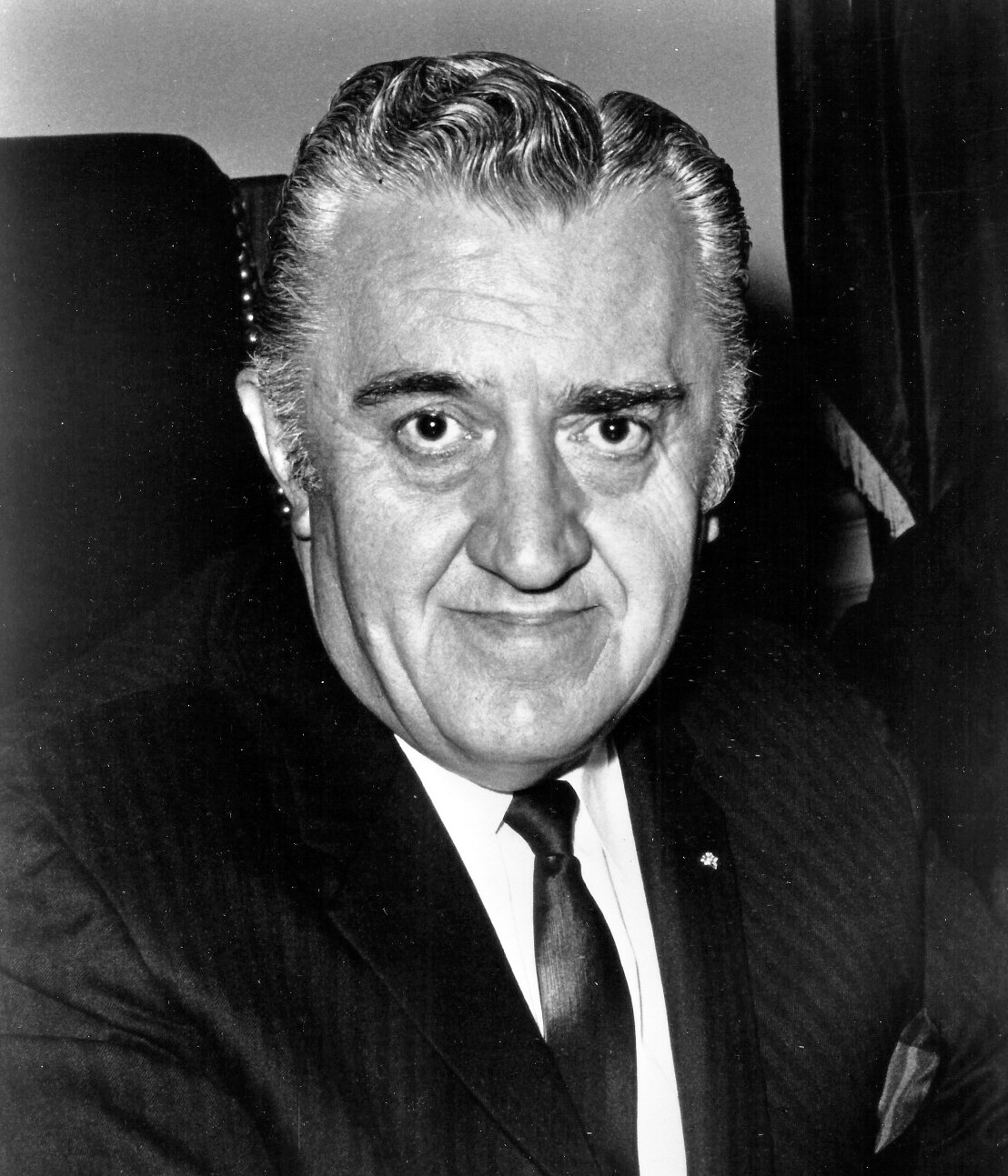

| Nominee | Walter S. Baring Jr. | Ralph L. Kraemer |
| Party | Democratic | Republican |
| Popular vote | 86,467 | 41,383 |
| Percentage | 67.6% | 32.4% |
- County results Baring: 60–70% 70–80% 80–90%
Representative
At-large before election
Walter S. Baring Jr.
Democratic
Elected Representative
At-large
Walter S. Baring Jr.
Democratic

The 1966 United States House of Representatives election in Nevada was held on Tuesday November 8, 1966, to elect the state's at-large representative. This election was held alongside the state's governor election. Incumbent Democrat, Walter S. Baring Jr. won re-election to another term in Congress by a landslide margin of 32.37% also carrying every county in the state with over 60 percent of the vote.

Primary elections were held on September 6, 1966.

== Democratic primary ==
Democratic primary results
| Party | Candidate | Votes | % |
|---|---|---|---|
| Democratic | Walter S. Baring Jr. (Incumbent) | 35,109 | 50.33 |
| Democratic | Ralph L. Denton | 32,654 | 46.81 |
| Democratic | George Ullom | 1,994 | 2.86 |
| Total votes | | 69,757 | 100.00 |

== Republican primary ==
Republican primary results
| Party | Candidate | Votes | % |
|---|---|---|---|
| Republican | Ralph L. Kraemer | 20,068 | 74.52 |
| Republican | Steve T. Kostelac | 6,863 | 25.48 |
| Total votes | | 26,931 | 100.00 |

== General election ==
General election results
| Party | Candidate | Votes | % |
|---|---|---|---|
| Democratic | Walter S. Baring Jr. (Incumbent) | 86,467 | 67.63% |
| Republican | Ralph L. Kraemer | 41,383 | 32.37% |
| Total votes | | 127,850 | 100.00% |
| Democratic hold | | | |
