= 1984 United States House of Representatives elections in Nevada =

1984 United States House of Representatives election in Nevada
- November 6, 1984
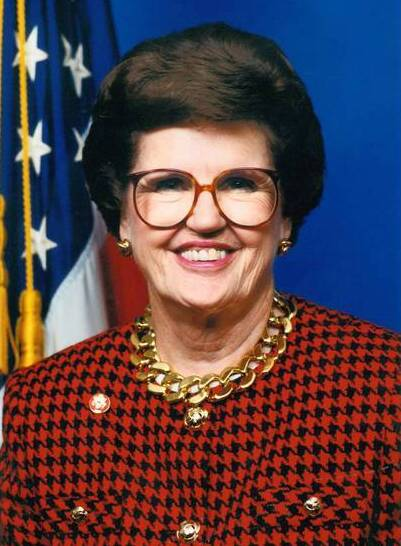

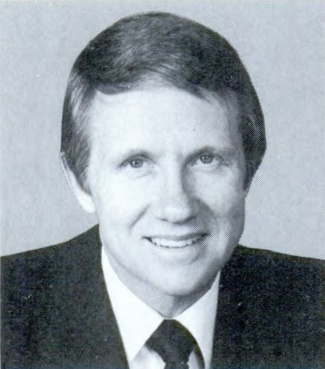
	First party	Second party
Leader	Barbara Vucanovich	Harry Reid
Party	Republican	Democratic
Leader's seat	2nd district	1st district
Seats won	1	1
Popular vote	155,166	109,372
Percentage	57.34%	40.41%

The 1984 United States House of Representatives elections in Nevada were held on November 6, 1984, to determine who would represent Nevada in the United States House of Representatives. Nevada had two seats in the House, apportioned according to the 1980 United States census. Representatives are elected for two-year terms.

== Overview ==
United States House of Representatives elections in Nevada, 1984
Party	Votes	Percentage	Seats	+/–
Republican	155,166	57.34%	1	-
Democratic	109,372	40.41%	1	-
Libertarian	6,086	2.25%	0	-
Totals	270,624	100.0%	2	-

== District 1 ==
1984 Republican U.S. House primary
Party	Candidate	Votes	%
Republican	Peggy Cavnar	14,442	83.30%
Republican	Richard Gilster	2,896	16.70%
Total votes		17,338	100.00%

Nevada's 1st congressional district election, 1984
Party	Candidate	Votes	%
Democratic	Harry Reid	73,242	56.12%
Republican	Peggy Cavnar	55,391	42.44%
Libertarian	Joe Morris	1,885	1.44%
Total votes		130,518	100.00%
Democratic hold			

== District 2 ==
1984 Libertarian U.S. House primary
Party	Candidate	Votes	%
Libertarian	Dan Becan	67	63.21%
Libertarian	H. Kent Cromwell	39	36.79%
Total votes		106	100.00%

Nevada's 2nd congressional district election, 1984
Party	Candidate	Votes	%
Republican	Barbara Vucanovich	99,775	71.21%
Democratic	Andrew Barbano	36,130	25.79%
Libertarian	Dan Becan	4,201	3.00%
Total votes		140,106	100.00%
Republican hold			

== See also ==
- 1984 United States House of Representatives elections
