= 1986 United States Senate election in Nevada =

Election in a U.S. state

- November 4, 1986
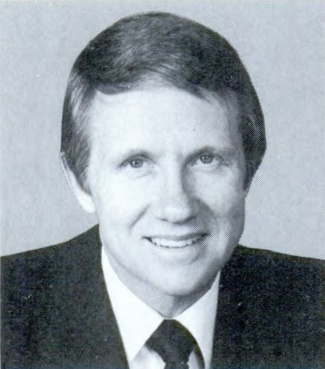

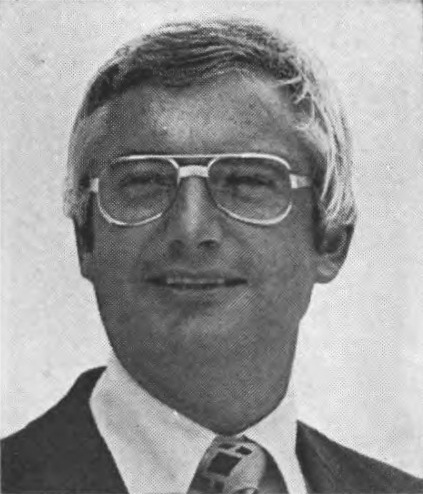
Nominee	Harry Reid	Jim Santini
Party	Democratic	Republican
Popular vote	130,955	116,606
Percentage	50.00%	44.52%
- County results Reid: 40–50% 60–70% Santini: 40–50% 50–60% 60–70% 70–80%
U.S. senator before election
Paul Laxalt
Republican
Elected U.S. Senator
Harry Reid
Democratic

The 1986 United States Senate election in Nevada was held on November 4, 1986. Incumbent Republican U.S. Senator Paul Laxalt decided to retire instead of seeking a third term. The Democratic nominee, U.S. representative Harry Reid, who previously ran for the senate in 1974, won the open seat.

== General election ==
=== Candidates ===
- Kent Cromwell (Libertarian)
- Harry Reid, U.S. Representative from Nevada's 1st congressional district and nominee for the United States Senate in 1974 (Democratic)
- Jim Santini, former Democratic U.S. Representative at-large (Republican)

=== Results ===
General election results
Party	Candidate	Votes	%	±%
Democratic	Harry Reid	130,955	50.00%	+12.61%
Republican	Jim Santini	116,606	44.52%	−14.01%
None of These Candidates		9,472	3.62%	+2.33%
Libertarian	Kent Cromwell	4,899	1.87%	−0.94%
Majority		14,349	5.48%	−15.66%
Turnout		261,932		
Democratic gain from Republican		Swing		

== See also ==
- 1986 United States Senate elections
