= 1976 United States House of Representatives election in Nevada =

1976 United States House election in Nevada
- November 2, 1976
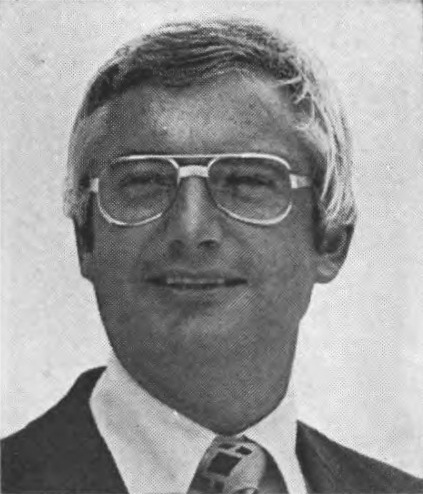

Nominee	Jim Santini	Walden Charles Earhart	Janine M. Hansen
Party	Democratic	Republican	Independent American
Popular vote	153,996	24,124	12,038
Percentage	77.05%	12.07%	6.02%
- County results Santini: 60–70% 70–80% 80–90%
Representative
At-large before election
James David Santini
Democratic
Elected Representative
At-large
James David Santini
Democratic

The 1976 United States House of Representatives election in Nevada was held on Tuesday November 2, 1976, to elect the state's at-large representative. Primary elections were held on September 2, 1976.

Incumbent Democrat James David Santini won re-election by a landslide margin of 64.98% over Republican nominee Walden Charles Earhart and Independent American, Janine M. Hansen.

== Republican primary ==
- Anthony Dart
- Walden Charles Earhart

=== Results ===
Republican primary results
Party	Candidate	Votes	%
Republican	None of These Candidates	16,097	47.31
Republican	Walden Charles Earhart	9,831	28.89
Republican	Anthony Dart	8,097	23.80
Total votes		34,025	100.00

== General election ==
General election results
Party	Candidate	Votes	%
Democratic	James David Santini	153,996	77.05%
Republican	Walden Charles Earhart	24,124	12.07%
Independent American	Janine M. Hansen	12,038	6.02%
Independent	None of These Candidates	6,880	3.44%
Libertarian	Jim Burns	2,825	1.41%
Total votes		167,966	100.00%
Democratic hold			
