= 1992 United States Senate election in Nevada =

- November 3, 1992
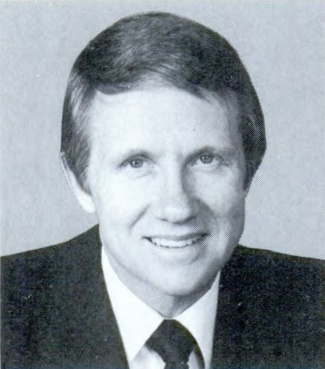

Nominee	Harry Reid	Demar Dahl
Party	Democratic	Republican
Popular vote	253,150	199,413
Percentage	51.05%	40.21%
- County results Reid: 40–50% 50–60% Dahl: 40–50% 50–60% 60–70%
U.S. senator before election
Harry Reid
Democratic
Elected U.S. Senator
Harry Reid
Democratic

The 1992 United States Senate election in Nevada was held on November 3, 1992. Although nearly 10% of the electorate voted for neither of the two major U.S. political parties, incumbent Democratic U.S. Senator Harry Reid won re-election to a second term with over 50% of the vote. Although Harry Reid defeated Demar Dahl in a landslide in the election, Bill Clinton won the state by a narrow margin in the concurrent presidential election in the state.

== Democratic primary ==
=== Candidates ===
- Harry Reid, incumbent U.S. Senator
- Charles Woods, Perennial Candidate
- Norman E. Hollingsworth, businessman

=== Results ===
Democratic primary results
Party	Candidate	Votes	%
Democratic	Harry Reid (incumbent)	64,828	52.82
Democratic	Charles Woods	48,364	39.40
None of These Candidates		4,429	3.61
Democratic	Norman E. Hollingsworth	3,253	2.65
Total votes		120,874	100.00

== Republican primary ==
=== Candidates ===
- Demar Dahl, cattle rancher and President of Nevada Cattlemen's Association
- Bob Gore
- Pro-Life Anderson, activist
- Patrick Matthew "Pat" Fitzpatrick
- Sam M. Cavnar
- Kirby Vanburch

=== Results ===
Republican Primary results
Party	Candidate	Votes	%
Republican	Demar Dahl	37,667	36.91
Republican	Bob Gore	31,963	31.32
None of These Candidates		13,523	13.25
Republican	Pro-Life Anderson	8,351	1.18
Republican	Pat Fritzpatrick	4,772	4.68
Republican	Sam M. Cavnar	4,243	4.16
Republican	Kirby Vanburch	1,542	1.51
Total votes			100.00

== General election ==
=== Candidates ===
- Harry Reid (D), incumbent U.S. Senator
- Demar Dahl (R), cattle rancher and President of Nevada Cattlemen's Association

=== Results ===
General election results
Party	Candidate	Votes	%	±%
Democratic	Harry Reid (incumbent)	253,150	51.05%	+1.05%
Republican	Demar Dahl	199,413	40.21%	−4.30%
None of These Candidates		13,154	2.65%	-0.96%
Independent American	Joe S. Garcia	11,240	2.27%	
Natural Law	Lois Avery	7,279	1.47%	
Libertarian	Kent Cromwell	7,222	1.46%	−0.41%
Populist	Harry Tootle	4,429	0.89%	
Majority		53,737	10.84%	+5.36%
Turnout		495,887		
Democratic hold		Swing		

== See also ==
- 1992 United States Senate elections
