= Richard Ziser =

American real estate investor and politician

Richard Ziser is an American real estate investor and socially conservative political activist belonging to the Republican Party.

== Early life ==
Ziser was born June 7, 1953, in Pomona, California, and has resided in Las Vegas, Nevada since 1991.

== Education ==
Ziser graduated from California State Polytechnic University, Pomona (Cal Poly Pomona) with a BS in Industrial Engineering, 1976; then subsequently from Simon Greenleaf University in Santa Ana, CA, (now a campus of Trinity International University, with an MA in Christian Apologetics in 1989.

== Career ==
=== U.S. Senate candidacy ===
In 2004, Ziser defeated 5 rival candidates in the Republican primary, then ran unsuccessfully for U.S. Senate against Democratic incumbent Harry Reid, losing 61%-35%. In 1998, Ziser lost his election bid to be on the Clark County, Nevada School Board.

=== Political activity ===
Ziser rose to political prominence as the leader of the effort to ban gay marriage in Nevada. He headed the Coalition for the Protection of Marriage, a successful, four-year campaign that succeeded in amending Nevada's State Constitution to define marriage as a union between "one man and one woman" in 2000.

In light of the Nevada Legislature's overriding of Governor Jim Gibbons' veto on domestic partnership legislation; due to take effect October 1, 2009. Ziser stated his intents to overturn the legislation as unconstitutional.

Ziser is also an anti-abortion activist, opposing legalized abortion by proposing a Personhood Constitutional Amendment designed to protect the "right to life," of the fetus.

== See also ==
- Same-sex marriage law in the United States by state
- Domestic partnership
- Recognition of same-sex unions in Nevada

== Additional sources ==
- Nevada Concerned Citizens (Coalition for the Protection of Marriage)
- Jane Ann Morrison, "Panel dismisses complaint over political ad", Las Vegas Review-Journal, September 25, 1998
- "Petition to ban same-sex marriages cheered", Las Vegas Sun, January 5, 2000
- Kris Hill, "Bill may extend rights for gays", Las Vegas Sun, March 27, 2001
- Erin Neff, "Ziser, marriage protection organizer, runs for Senate", Las Vegas Sun, August 28, 2003
- Erin Neff and Michael Squires, "Political Notebook: Subpoenas, polygraphs part of Moncrief probe", Las Vegas Review-Journal, October 26, 2003
- Steve Sebelius-OpEd, "A very bad sign", Las Vegas Review-Journal, September 16, 2004
- Richard Ziser, "The Next Step In Marriage Protection", Desert Saints Magazine, July 2006 Issue
- Richard Fitzpatrick, "Being politically correct on Family Day 2006", Nevada Confidential, November 22, 2006
- Steve Sebelius, "Have we had enough hate yet?", Las Vegas CityLife, June 21, 2007
- Erin NefF-OpEd, "More 'protection'", Las Vegas Review-Journal, May 18, 2006
- Andrew Kiraly, "Oh, about that ruined state economy: Blame Richard Ziser, too.", Las Vegas CityLife, July 29, 2008
- Richard Lake, "Same-sex marriage ban might be costing Nevada", Las Vegas Review-Journal, July 29, 2008
- "Richard Ziser and Janine Hanson Do A Tag-Team Of Stupid At The Nevada Legislature", Vegas Tea Room, March 27, 2009
- "Domestic partnerships to be law in Nevada", United Press International, June 1, 2009
- Ed Vogel and Molly Ball, "Lawmakers override veto of domestic partner bill", The Ely News, June 6, 2009
- Martha Bellisle, "Nevada partners law to enable registered couples to adopt children", Reno Gazette-Journal, June 4, 2009
- Kathleen Hennessey, "Sen. Ensign's admission blurs conservative image", Associated Press, June 17, 2009

Party political offices
Preceded by John Ensign	Republican Party nominee for U.S. Senator from Nevada (Class 3); 2004	Succeeded by Sharron Angle
