= 2004 United States Senate election in Nevada =

- November 2, 2004

Nominee	Harry Reid	Richard Ziser
Party	Democratic	Republican
Popular vote	494,805	284,640
Percentage	61.08%	35.14%
- Reid: 40–50% 50–60% 60–70% Ziser: 40–50% 50–60%
U.S. senator before election
Harry Reid
Democratic
Elected U.S. Senator
Harry Reid
Democratic

Republican primary results by county Ziser: 20–30%; 30–40%; 40–50%; Wegner: 20–30%; None of These Candidates: 20–30%; 30–40%; Tilley: 20–30%

The 2004 United States Senate election in Nevada was held on November 2, 2004. Incumbent Democratic U.S. Senator Harry Reid, the Senate Minority Whip, won re-election to a fourth term despite Republican President George W. Bush carrying the state in the concurrent presidential race.

== Background ==
Having only won re-election in 1998 by 428 votes, Harry Reid initially looked vulnerable given Nevada's position as a swing state for the presidential election. However the decisions of top Republican recruit Jim Gibbons and other potential high-profile challengers to pass on the race helped secure the election for Reid.

== Democratic primary ==
=== Candidates ===
==== Nominee ====
- Harry Reid, incumbent U.S. Senator and Senate Minority Whip

== Republican primary ==
=== Candidates ===
==== Nominee ====
- Richard Ziser, anti-gay marriage activist

==== Eliminated in primary ====
- Kenneth A. Wegner, U.S. Army veteran
- Robert Brown
- Royle Melton
- Cherie Tilley, businessman
- Carlo Poliak, perennial candidate

===== Declined =====
- Kathy Augustine, Nevada State Controller
- Lynette Boggs-McDonald, Las Vegas City Council member and nominee for 1st district in 2002
- Jim Gibbons, incumbent U.S. Representative and nominee for Governor in 1994
- Dean Heller, Secretary of State of Nevada
- Brian Krolicki, Nevada State Treasurer

=== Results ===
Republican primary results
Party	Candidate	Votes	%
Republican	Richard Ziser	40,533	33.50
Republican	Kenneth A. Wegner	21,406	17.69
Republican	Robert Brown	19,553	16.16
Republican	None of these candidates	16,827	13.91
Republican	Royle Melton	10,552	8.72
Republican	Cherie M. Tilley	10,357	8.56
Republican	Carlo Poliak	1,769	1.46
Total votes		120,997	100.0

== General election ==
=== Candidates ===
- Thomas Hurst (L)
- Gary Marinch (NL)
- Harry Reid (D), incumbent U.S. Senator
- David Schumann (I)
- Richard Ziser (R), conservative activist

=== Predictions ===
Source	Ranking	As of
The Cook Political Report	Safe D	October 26, 2004
Sabato's Crystal Ball	Safe D	November 1, 2004

==== Polling ====
Poll source	Date(s) administered	Sample size (Note: Key: A – all adults RV – registered voters LV – likely voters V – unclear)	Margin of error	Harry Reid (D)	Richard Ziser (R)	Other	Undecided
Mason-Dixon Polling & Research Inc./ Las Vegas Review-Journal	October 26–27, 2004	625 (LV)	± 4.0%	59%	35%	3%	3%

=== Results ===
General election results
Party	Candidate	Votes	%	±%
Democratic	Harry Reid (incumbent)	494,805	61.08	+13.22
Republican	Richard Ziser	284,640	35.14	–12.63
None of These Candidates		12,968	1.60	–0.26
Libertarian	Thomas Hurst	9,559	1.18	–0.69
Independent American Party (Nevada)	David Schumann	6,001	0.74	N/a
Natural Law	Gary Marinch	2,095	0.26	–0.38
Majority		210,165	25.94	+25.85
Turnout		810,068		
Democratic hold		Swing		

==== By county ====
County	Harry Reid Democratic		Richard Ziser Republican		None of These Candidates		Thomas L. Hurst Libertarian		David K. Schumann IAPN		Gary Marinch Natural Law		Margin		Total votes
County	#	%	#	%	#	%	#	%	#	%	#	%	#	%	Total votes
Carson City	12,478	54.68	9,559	41.89	330	1.45	188	0.82	197	0.86	67	0.29	2,919	12.79	22,819
Churchill	3,995	39.47	5,647	55.79	209	2.06	102	1.00	131	1.29	38	0.38	-1,652	-16.32	10,122
Clark	345,694	65.02	167,104	31.43	8,207	1.54	6,487	1.22	2,988	0.56	1,222	0.23	178,590	33.59	531,702
Douglas	10,409	44.66	12,120	52.00	304	1.30	210	0.90	205	0.88	61	0.26	-1,711	-7.34	23,309
Elko	6,084	40.57	7,912	52.76	384	2.56	270	1.80	265	1.77	82	1.26	-1,828	-12.19	14,997
Esmeralda	162	33.96	257	53.88	23	4.82	13	2.73	20	4.19	2	0.42	-95	-19.92	477
Eureka	267	36.38	404	55.04	33	4.50	12	1.63	14	1.91	4	0.54	-137	-18.66	734
Humboldt	2,524	47.98	2,431	46.22	137	2.60	73	1.39	85	1.62	10	0.19	93	1.76	5,260
Lander	908	44.86	989	48.86	59	2.92	19	0.94	39	1.93	10	0.49	-89	-4.00	2,024
Lincoln	745	36.81	1,128	55.73	81	4.00	22	1.09	42	2.08	6	0.30	-383	-18.92	2,024
Lyon	7,526	44.68	8,633	51.25	261	1.55	148	0.88	224	1.33	54	0.32	-1,107	-6.57	16,846
Mineral	1,565	68.73	591	25.96	37	1.62	20	0.88	51	2.24	13	0.57	974	42.77	2,277
Nye	7,521	53.52	5,798	41.26	273	1.94	178	1.27	223	1.59	60	0.43	1,723	12.26	14,053
Pershing	960	50.47	817	43.18	49	2.59	30	1.59	27	1.43	9	0.43	143	7.29	1,892
Storey	1,133	53.17	914	42.89	28	1.31	25	1.17	26	1.22	5	0.23	219	10.28	2,131
Washoe	90,706	58.27	58,994	37.90	2,432	1.56	1,705	1.10	1,399	0.90	416	0.27	31,712	20.37	155,652
White Pine	2,128	56.76	1,342	35.80	121	3.23	57	1.52	65	1.73	36	0.96	786	20.96	3,749
Totals	494,805	61.08	284,640	35.14	12,968	1.60	9,559	1.18	6,001	0.74	2,095	0.26	210,165	25.94	810,068

Counties that flipped from Republican to Democratic

- Carson City
- Humboldt (largest municipality: Winnemucca)
- Nye (largest municipality: Pahrump)
- Pershing (largest municipality: Lovelock)
- Storey (largest municipality: Virginia City)
- White Pine (largest municipality: Ely)
- Washoe (largest municipality: Reno)

== See also ==
- 2004 United States Senate elections
