= Harry Reid =

American politician (1939–2021)

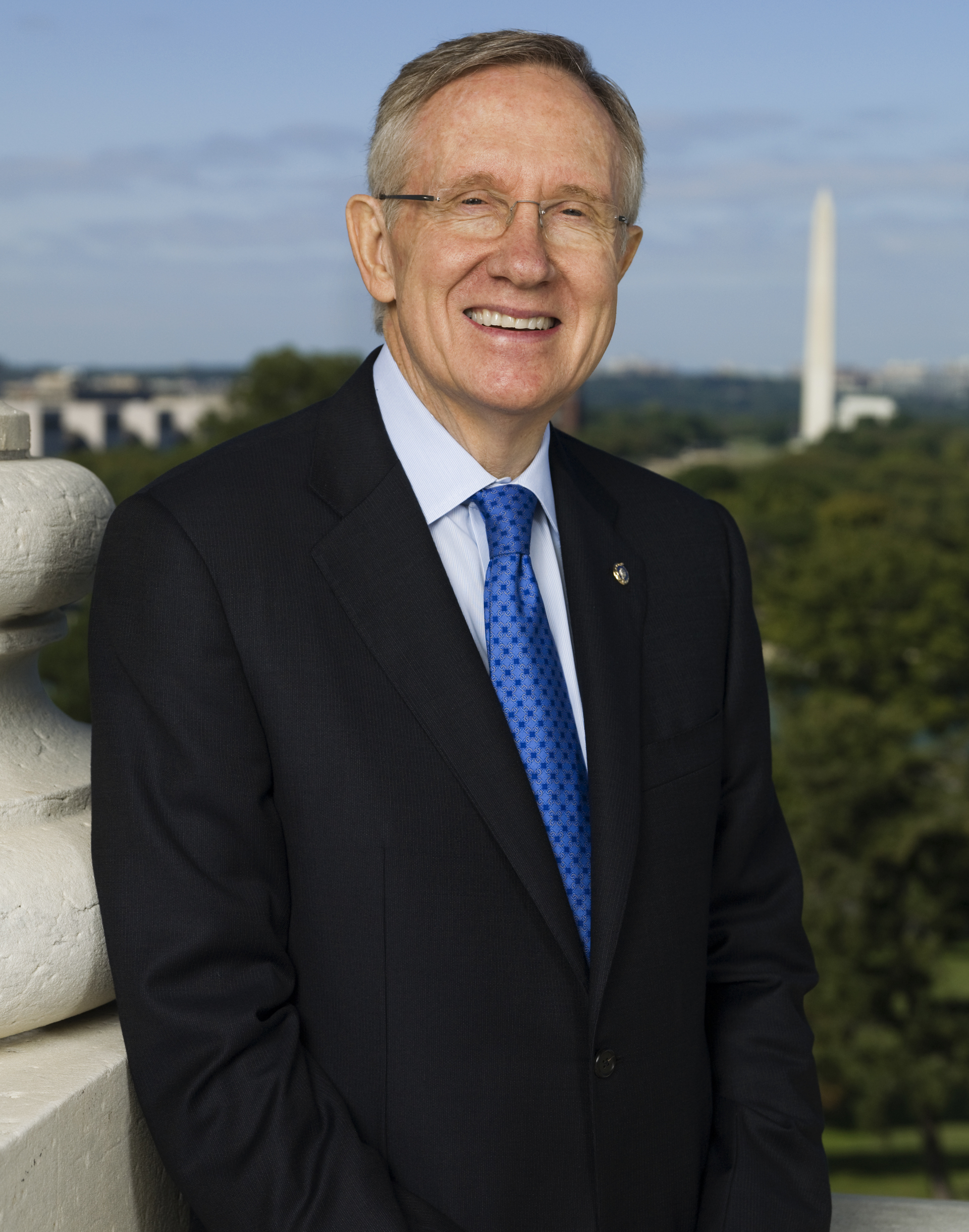
- Official portrait, 2009

Senate Majority Leader
- In office January 3, 2007 – January 3, 2015
- Whip: Dick Durbin
- Preceded by: Bill Frist
- Succeeded by: Mitch McConnell

United States Senator from Nevada
- In office January 3, 1987 – January 3, 2017
- Preceded by: Paul Laxalt
- Succeeded by: Catherine Cortez Masto
Senate positions
Senate Minority Leader
In office January 3, 2015 – January 3, 2017
Whip	Dick Durbin
Preceded by	Mitch McConnell
Succeeded by	Chuck Schumer
In office January 3, 2005 – January 3, 2007
Whip	Dick Durbin
Preceded by	Tom Daschle
Succeeded by	Mitch McConnell
Leader of the Senate Democratic Caucus
In office January 3, 2005 – January 3, 2017
Preceded by	Tom Daschle
Succeeded by	Chuck Schumer
Senate Minority Whip
In office January 3, 2003 – January 3, 2005
Leader	Tom Daschle
Preceded by	Don Nickles
Succeeded by	Dick Durbin
In office January 20, 2001 – June 6, 2001
Leader	Tom Daschle
Preceded by	Don Nickles
Succeeded by	Don Nickles
In office January 3, 1999 – January 3, 2001
Leader	Tom Daschle
Preceded by	Wendell Ford
Succeeded by	Don Nickles
Senate Majority Whip
In office June 6, 2001 – January 3, 2003
Leader	Tom Daschle
Preceded by	Don Nickles
Succeeded by	Mitch McConnell
In office January 3, 2001 – January 20, 2001
Leader	Tom Daschle
Preceded by	Don Nickles
Succeeded by	Don Nickles

Member of the U.S. House of Representatives from Nevada's 1st district
- In office January 3, 1983 – January 3, 1987
- Preceded by: James Santini (at-large)
- Succeeded by: James Bilbray

Chair of the Nevada Gaming Commission
- In office March 27, 1977 – January 5, 1981
- Appointed by: Mike O'Callaghan
- Preceded by: Peter Echeverria
- Succeeded by: Carl Dodge

25th Lieutenant Governor of Nevada
- In office January 4, 1971 – January 5, 1975
- Governor: Mike O'Callaghan
- Preceded by: Edward Fike
- Succeeded by: Robert Rose

Member of the Nevada Assembly from the 4th district
- In office January 6, 1969 – January 4, 1971
- Preceded by: Edward Fike
- Succeeded by: Robert Rose

Personal details
- Born: Harry Mason Reid Jr. December 2, 1939 Searchlight, Nevada, U.S.
- Died: December 28, 2021 (aged 82) Henderson, Nevada, U.S.
- Party: Democratic
- Spouse: Landra Gould (m. 1959)
- Children: 5, including Rory
- Education: Southern Utah University; Utah State University (BA); George Washington University (JD)
- Website: Senate website (archived)
- Reid's voice Reid honors retiring Senator Arlen Specter. Recorded December 15, 2010

Harry Mason Reid Jr. (/riːd/; December 2, 1939 – December 28, 2021) was an American lawyer and politician who served as a United States senator from Nevada from 1987 to 2017. He led the Senate Democratic Caucus from 2005 to 2017 and was the Senate majority leader from 2007 to 2015.

After earning an undergraduate degree from Utah State University and a Juris Doctor degree from George Washington University, Reid began his public career as the city attorney for Henderson, Nevada, before being elected to the Nevada Assembly in 1968. Gubernatorial candidate Mike O'Callaghan, Reid's former boxing coach, chose Reid as his running mate in 1970; following their victory Reid served as the 25th lieutenant governor of Nevada from 1971 to 1975. After being defeated in races for the United States Senate and mayor of Las Vegas, Reid served as chairman of the Nevada Gaming Commission from 1977 to 1981. From 1983 to 1987, Reid represented Nevada's 1st district in the United States House of Representatives.

Reid was elected to the United States Senate in 1986 and served in the Senate from 1987 to 2017. He served as the Senate Democratic whip from 1999 to 2005 before succeeding Tom Daschle as Senate minority leader. The Democrats won control of the Senate after the 2006 United States Senate elections, and Reid became the Senate Majority Leader in 2007. He held that position for the final two years of George W. Bush's presidency and for the first six years of Barack Obama's presidency. As majority leader, Reid helped pass major legislation of the Obama administration, such as the Affordable Care Act, the Dodd–Frank Act, and the American Recovery and Reinvestment Act of 2009. In 2013, under Reid's leadership, the Senate Democratic majority controversially invoked the "nuclear option" to eliminate the 60-vote requirement to end a filibuster for presidential nominations, other than nominations to the U.S. Supreme Court. Republicans took control of the Senate following the 2014 United States Senate elections, and Reid served as Senate minority leader from 2015 until his retirement in 2017. Reid is Nevada's longest-serving senator, surpassing John P. Jones's record by two days.

Reid was succeeded as the Senate Democratic leader by Chuck Schumer, whose leadership bid had been endorsed by Reid. Along with Alben W. Barkley and Mike Mansfield, Reid was one of only three senators to have served at least eight years as majority leader. Harry Reid International Airport, which serves the Las Vegas Valley, was named after Reid on December 14, 2021, two weeks before his death from cancer. The airport was previously named after Pat McCarran, one of Reid's Senate predecessors.

== Early life and early career ==
Harry Mason Reid Jr. was born on December 2, 1939, in Searchlight, Nevada, the third of four sons of Harry Reid, a rock miner, and Inez Orena (Jaynes) Reid, a laundress for local brothels. At that time, Searchlight was a small, impoverished town. His father died by suicide in 1972, at the age of 58, when Harry was 32 years old. His paternal grandmother was an English immigrant from Darlaston, Staffordshire. Reid's boyhood home was a shack with no indoor toilet, hot water, or telephone.

Since Searchlight had no high school, Reid boarded with relatives 40 miles (64 km) away, in Henderson, so that he could attend Basic High School, where he played football and was an amateur boxer. While at Basic High, he met future Nevada governor Mike O'Callaghan, who was a teacher there and served as Reid's boxing coach. Reid attended Southern Utah University and graduated from Utah State University in 1961, where he double-majored in political science and history. He also minored in economics at Utah State's School of Commerce and Business Administration. He then attended George Washington University Law School while working as a police officer for the United States Capitol Police, and he earned his Juris Doctor in 1964.

== Early political career ==
=== State politics ===
Reid returned to Nevada after law school and served as Henderson city attorney before being elected to the Nevada Assembly for the multi-member fourth district of Clark County in 1968. In 1970, at age 30, Reid was chosen by O'Callaghan as his running mate for Lieutenant Governor of Nevada. Reid and O'Callaghan won their respective races, and Reid served as lieutenant governor from 1971 to 1974, when he ran for the U.S. Senate seat that was being vacated by Alan Bible. He lost by fewer than 700 votes to former governor Paul Laxalt. In 1975, Reid ran for mayor of Las Vegas and lost to Bill Briare.

Reid served as chairman of the Nevada Gaming Commission from 1977 to 1981. When Jack Gordon offered Reid a $12,000 bribe to get approval of new games for casinos, Reid brought in the FBI to tape Gordon's bribery attempt and arrest him. After FBI agents interrupted the transaction as prearranged, Reid lost his temper and attempted to choke Gordon, saying, "You son of a bitch, you tried to bribe me!" before agents stopped him. Gordon was convicted in 1979 and sentenced to six months in prison. Reid presided over the 1979 hearing that refused to issue a gaming license to casino operator Frank Rosenthal because of his ties to organized crime groups such as the Chicago Outfit and particularly his close personal association with mobster Anthony Spilotro. Reid later stated that "Rosenthal was the only person that I was ever afraid of." Rosenthal loudly and publicly confronted Reid after the hearing, telling gathered reporters that he had performed many personal favors for Reid. Reid conceded under heated interrogation from Rosenthal that the two men had met for lunch at his Stardust Resort and Casino and that he had asked Rosenthal to cover up undesirable news stories. FBI wiretaps captured mobsters claiming that Reid was under their control, causing governor Robert List to feel pressure to ask Reid to resign. However, List believed Reid's assertions that the accusations were baseless. In 1981, Reid's wife found a bomb attached to the family station wagon; Reid suspected it was placed by Rosenthal or Gordon, although this has never been proven in court.

=== Member of the U.S. House of Representatives ===
Before the 1980 census, Nevada had only a single at-large member of the United States House of Representatives, but population growth in the 1970s led to the state gaining a second district. Reid won the Democratic nomination for the 1st district, based in Las Vegas, in 1982, and easily won the general election. He was re-elected in 1984.

Reid was instrumental in the establishment of Great Basin National Park, sponsoring the bill creating it in 1986 and ensuring the protection of Wheeler Peak and groves of bristlecone pine.

== U.S. Senate ==
=== Elections ===
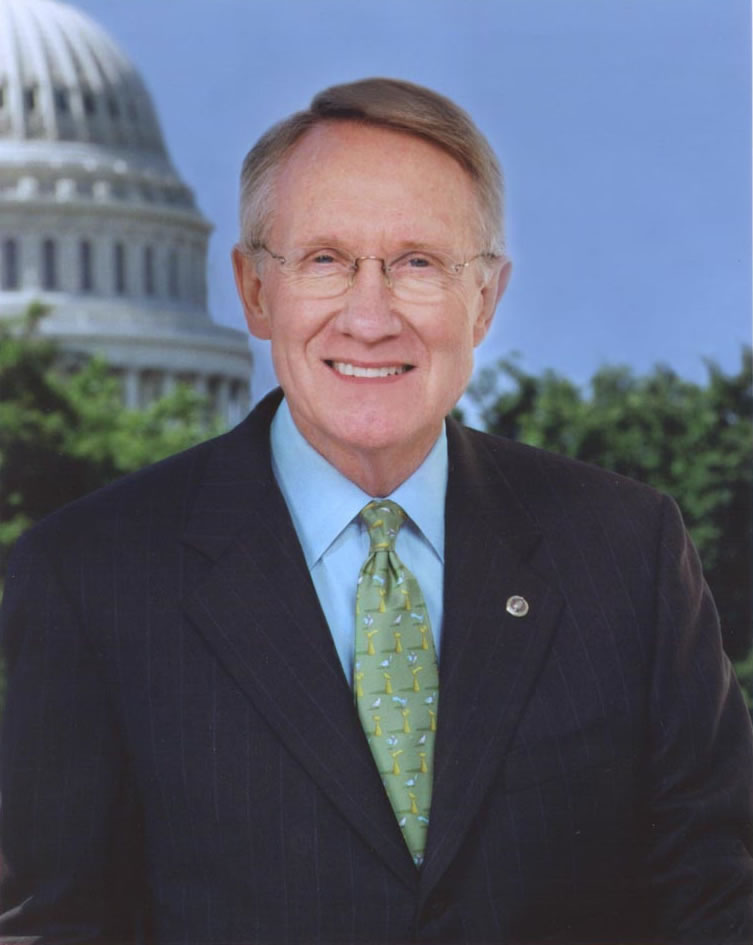
Reid during the 107th Congress in 2002

In 1986, Reid won the Democratic nomination for the seat of retiring two-term incumbent Republican Senator Paul Laxalt. Reid defeated former at-large U.S. Representative Jim Santini, a Democrat who had turned Republican, in the November election. Reid ran for reelection in 1992, which he won by a double-digit margin. In 1998 he narrowly defeated U.S. Representative John Ensign in the midst of a statewide Republican sweep. In 2004, Reid won reelection with 61 percent of the vote, defeating Richard Ziser.

Ensign was elected to Nevada's other Senate seat in 2000. Ensign and Reid had a very good relationship despite their bitter contest in 1998. The two frequently worked together on Nevada issues until Ensign resigned his Senate seat in 2011 due to an ethics scandal.

In 2010, Reid won the Democratic nomination with 75% of the vote in the June 8 primary. He then faced a very competitive race in the 2010 general election. Reid engaged in a $1 million media campaign to "reintroduce himself" to the state's voters. He defeated Republican challenger Sharron Angle in the November 2 election, 50.3% to 44.6%.

In January 2015, Reid suffered severe injuries in an exercise accident. On March 27, 2015, Reid uploaded a video to his YouTube account announcing that he would not seek reelection in November 2016. Reid endorsed Senator Chuck Schumer from New York to succeed him as minority leader. Former Nevada Attorney General and fellow Democrat Catherine Cortez Masto was elected to succeed Reid as a U.S. senator from Nevada.

On January 1, 2017, two days before the end of his term, Reid surpassed Senator John P. Jones to become the longest-serving U.S. Senator from Nevada.

=== Leadership ===
From 1999 to 2005, Reid served as Senate Democratic Whip, as minority whip from 1999 to 2001, and again from 2003 to 2005. Reid was the majority whip from 2001 to 2003, except for a brief period from January to June 2001. He was the ranking member of the Environment and Public Works Committee from January to June 2001 (succeeding Max Baucus) before relinquishing the position to allow Jim Jeffords to switch parties and become chair, having given Democrats the majority. From 2001 to 2003, he served as chairman of the Senate Ethics Committee. Reid succeeded Tom Daschle as minority leader in 2005, and became majority leader after the 2006 election, a role he held until 2015. He was again minority leader until his retirement in 2017, and was succeeded by Chuck Schumer.

Liberal critics argued that Reid allowed Senate Republicans to create a 60-vote bar for passage of bills without a Democratic filibuster. Conservatives criticized Reid for his extensive use of the procedural tactic known as "filling the tree" to prevent amendments on important bills.

==== UFOs ====
In 2007, while he was the Senate majority leader, Reid initiated the Advanced Aerospace Threat Identification Program to study unidentified flying objects at the urging of Reid's friend, Nevada billionaire and governmental contractor Robert Bigelow, and with support from senators Ted Stevens (R-Alaska) and Daniel Inouye (D-Hawaii). The program began in the DIA in 2007 and was budgeted $22 million over its five years of operation.

The United States Air Force facility Homey Airport, commonly known as Area 51, is located on Groom Lake in Reid's home state of Nevada, and has been rumored to house materials allegedly retrieved from the 1947 Roswell UFO incident.

June 24, 2009, letter from Senate Majority Leader Harry Reid to Deputy Secretary of Defense William Lynn regarding the Advanced Aerospace Threat and Identification Program (AATIP)

When interviewed in the aftermath of publicity surrounding the AATIP, Reid expressed pride in his accomplishment and was quoted as saying, "I think it's one of the good things I did in my congressional service. I've done something that no one has done before." Reid explained the reasoning behind his sponsorship of the program by saying "I'm interested in science, and in helping the American public understand what the hell is going on" and stated that "hundreds and hundreds of papers" have been available since the program was completed and that "Most all of it, 80 percent at least, is public" adding "I wanted it public, it was made public, and you guys have not even looked at it."

A 2009 letter by Reid was published by KLAS-TV investigative journalists George Knapp and Matt Adams, where the Senator states that AATIP has made "much progress" with the "identification of several highly sensitive, unconventional aerospace-related findings" that will "likely lead to technology advancements" and recommends the creation of a special access program for specific parts of AATIP.

==== Nuclear option ====
On November 21, 2013, under Reid's tenure as Majority Leader, the Democratic majority Senate voted 52–48 to eliminate the 60-vote requirement to end a filibuster against all executive branch nominees and judicial nominees other than to the U.S. Supreme Court. A 3/5 supermajority was still required to end filibusters unrelated to those nominees, such as for legislation and Supreme Court nominees. The Democrats' stated motivation for the "nuclear option" was expansion of filibustering by Republicans during the Obama administration, in particular blocking three nominations to the United States Court of Appeals for the District of Columbia Circuit.

Reid's invocation of the nuclear option on judicial nominations was controversial as, on April 6, 2017, Senate Republicans similarly invoked the nuclear option to remove the Supreme Court exception created in 2013, allowing the Trump administration to appoint Justices on party lines. This was after Senate Democrats filibustered the nomination of Neil Gorsuch to the Supreme Court of the United States and after the Senate Republicans had previously refused to take up Merrick Garland's nomination by President Obama in 2016.

=== Ethics controversies ===
Reid was criticized during his tenure for several potentially self-enriching tactics. In 2005, Reid earmarked a spending bill to provide for building a bridge between Nevada and Arizona that would make land he owned more valuable. Reid called funding for the construction of a bridge over the Colorado River, among other projects, "incredibly good news for Nevada" in a news release after the passage of the 2006 transportation bill. He owned 160 acres (65 ha) of land several miles from the proposed bridge site in Arizona. The bridge could add value to his real estate investment. A year later it was reported that Reid had used campaign donations to pay for $3,300 in Christmas gifts to the staff at the condominium where he resided; federal election law prohibits candidates from using political donations for personal use. Reid's staff stated that his campaign attorneys had approved this use of the funds, but that Reid would personally reimburse his campaign for the expenses. Citizens United filed a complaint with the Federal Election Commission to investigate the matter.

A series of investigative reports in the Los Angeles Times suggested that Reid had introduced legislation and imposed pressure on regulatory agencies to advance the business interests of his close friend Harvey Whittemore, a Nevada attorney-lobbyist who contributed heavily to Reid's campaigns and leadership fund and who employed Reid's son Leif as his personal attorney. With Reid's help, Whittemore was able to proceed with construction of a $30 billion planned golf course development, Coyote Springs, a project heavily criticized by environmental groups for reasons including its projected effects on several endangered species. Whittemore served a two-year prison sentence after being found guilty in 2013 of funneling $133,400 in illegal contributions to Reid's reelection campaign.

=== Committee assignments ===
- Select Committee on Intelligence (ex officio)
- Joint Committee on Inaugural Ceremonies
- Chair of the Senate Ethics Committee 2001–2003

== Political positions ==
Reid scored a lifetime conservative rating of 19% from the American Conservative Union (ACU), and a 2008 liberal rating of 70% from the Americans for Democratic Action (ADA). Other independent ratings include a 29% rating in 2003 from the abortion rights lobbyist organization NARAL, an 85% rating from Planned Parenthood in 2013, and a "B" rating from the NRA Political Victory Fund.

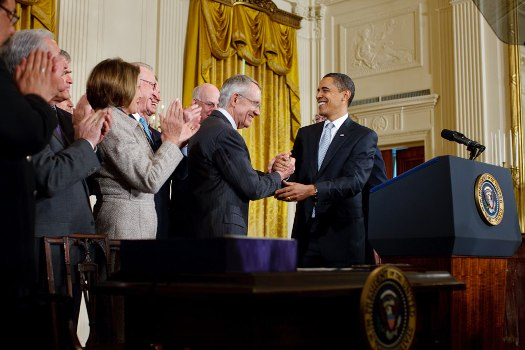
President Barack Obama shakes hands with Reid after signing the Omnibus Public Lands Management Act of 2009 on March 30, 2009.

Reid spearheaded several initiatives while in Congress. In 2006, Reid co-sponsored the Prevention First Amendment with Hillary Clinton, which would fund abortion prevention efforts such as giving women broader access to contraception. The bill faced Republican opposition and failed. In January 2007, Reid brought a Senate ethics reform bill to a vote to bar congressional members from accepting gifts, meals, and trips from lobbyists and organizations employing lobbyists, to bar Senators from borrowing corporate jets for travel, and to compel Senators to disclose names of sponsors, or authors, of bills and projects. The bill passed 96–2. In the 111th Congress, Reid shepherded the Patient Protection and Affordable Care Act (PPACA) through the Senate.

Reid was initially a centrist Democrat, and he held anti-abortion views and supported gun rights and opposed illegal immigration. He was considered fiscally liberal and socially conservative. He believed that Roe v. Wade should be overturned, and in 1999, voted against an amendment that supported Roe. In 1998, he stated that he believed in a restricted right to abortion, stating that "abortions should be legal only when the pregnancy resulted from incest, rape, or when the life of the woman is endangered". He voted several times to ban the intact dilation and evacuation, or "partial-birth abortion" procedure. Reid supported embryonic stem cell research. Over time, Reid's views became more progressive.

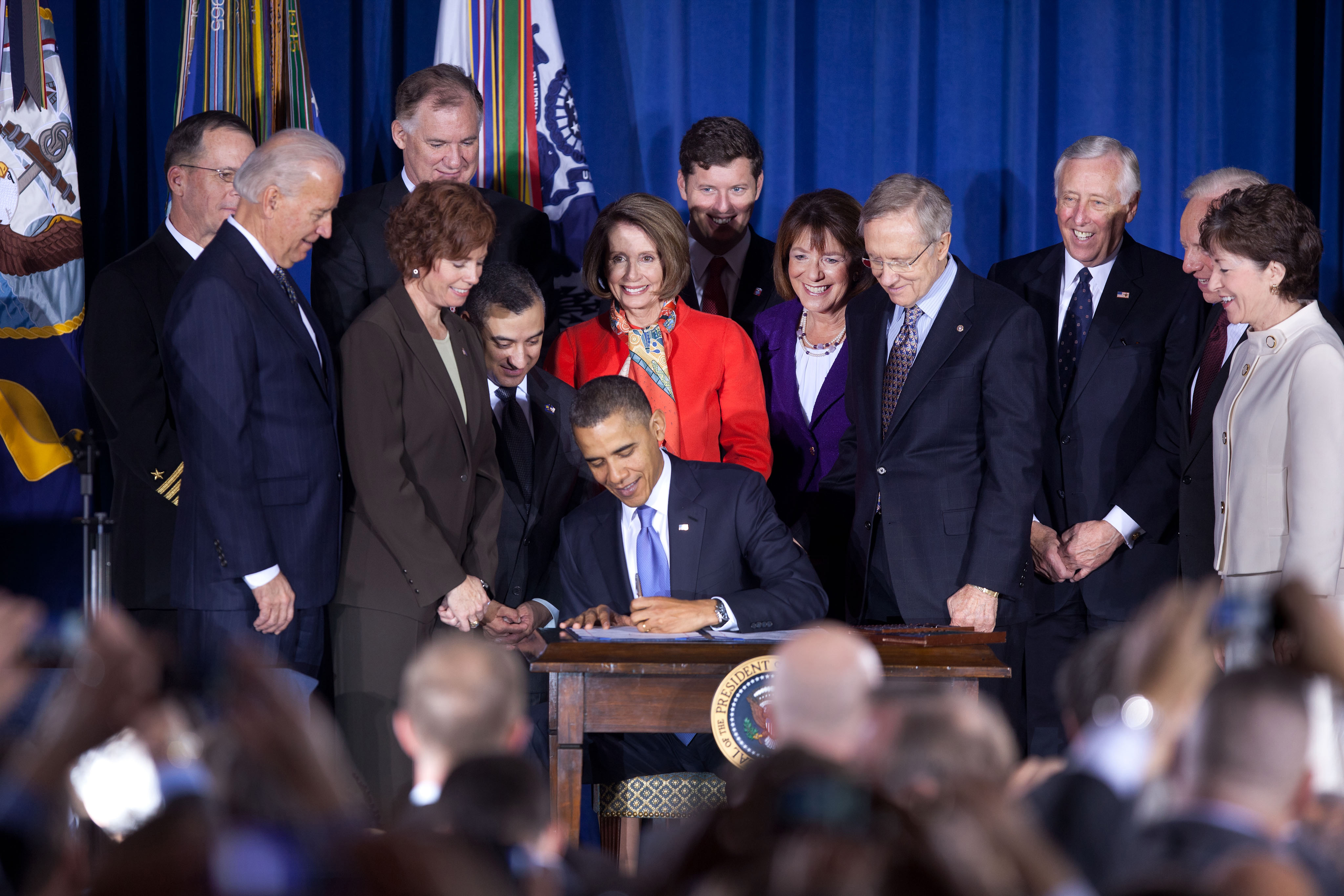
Reid stands near President Barack Obama as he signs the repeal of Don't Ask Don't Tell.

Regarding same-sex marriage, Reid initially believed that "marriage should be between a man and a woman", but abandoned that position in favor of same-sex marriage in 2012.

In regard to local issues, Reid firmly opposed construction of the proposed Yucca Mountain federal nuclear waste repository in Nevada. Reid initially opposed the legalization of online poker, but in 2010 it was reported his position had evolved – a move some argued was influenced by "hundreds of thousands of dollars Las Vegas casinos contributed to his re-election campaign".

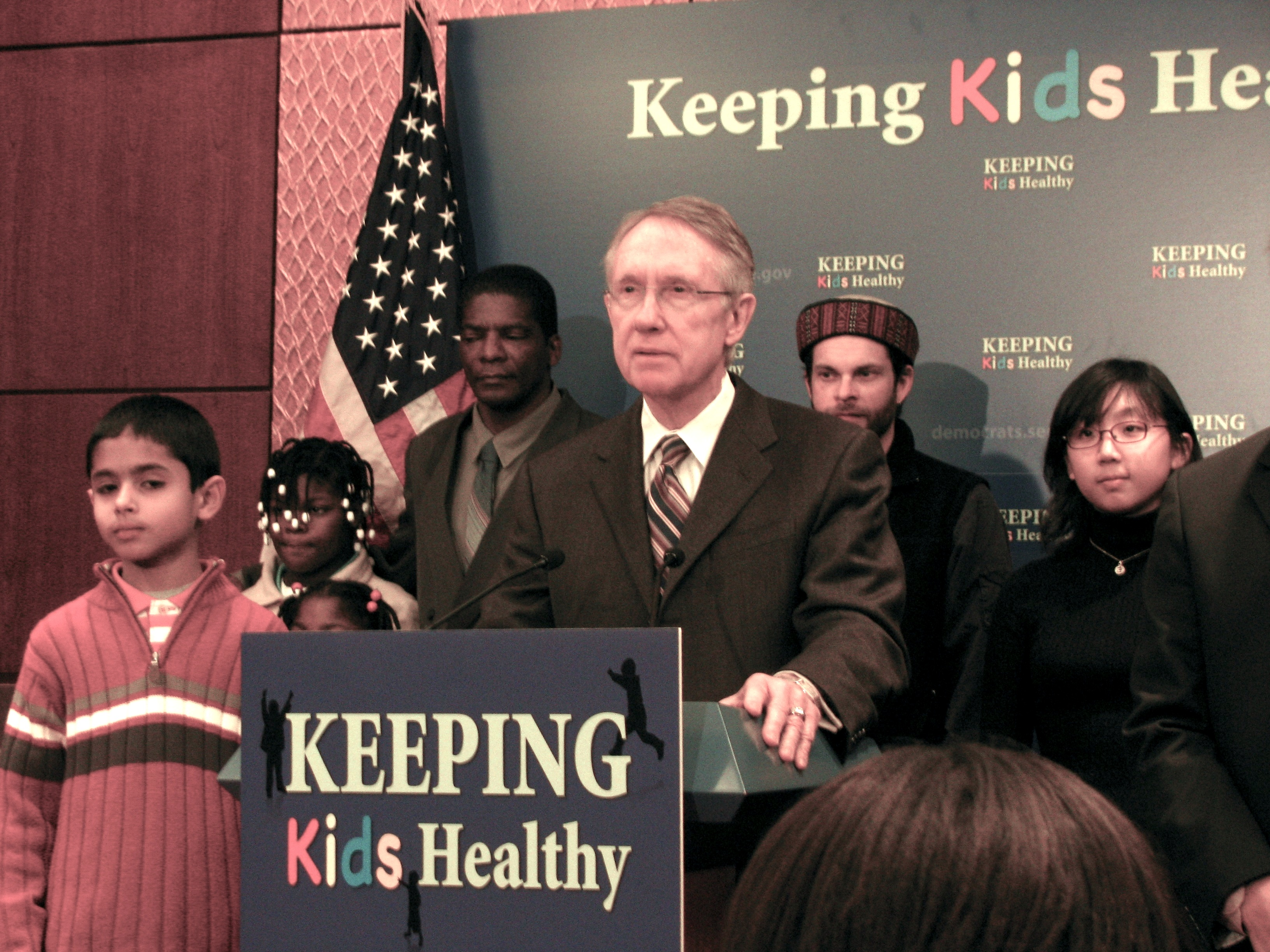
Reid speaking at the State Children's Health Insurance Program Art Exhibit press conference

Reid called immigration reform one of his priorities at the 110th Congress. He supported the DREAM Act (Development, Relief, and Education for Alien Minors Act), which would give certain high school graduates who had arrived in the U.S. illegally, conditional legal status so they could attend college or enlist in the military. They could then obtain permanent legal residency after completing two years of military service or two years of college.

Reid supported use of force in the Middle East, but in September 2007, called for a drastic change in strategy. In January 1991, Reid voted to authorize the first Gulf War, quoting John F. Kennedy's 1963 State of the Union speech on the Senate floor, saying "the mere absence of war is not peace." He also voted in support of the 2003 invasion of Iraq. In March 2007, he voted in favor of "redeploying U.S. troops out of Iraq by March 2008", and later that year said, "As long as we follow [President Bush's] path in Iraq, the war is lost."

Reid was a strong advocate of recognizing the Armenian genocide.

Reid was a staunch defender of Obamacare both online and in speeches. He advocated outlawing prostitution in Nevada.

On May 15, 2013, Reid revealed to reporters that his niece is a lesbian as he spoke about his hope that the Employment Non-Discrimination Act would be signed into law.

=== Conservation legacy ===
Reid supported land conservation in Nevada. He successfully secured the designation of about 5.1 million acres (21,000 km^{2}) of U.S. federal land in Nevada as protected land, shielding them from development. Among these were the Tule Springs Fossil Beds National Monument, the Basin and Range National Monument, and the Gold Butte National Monument.

Reid was also the champion of the Southern Nevada Public Lands Management Act, 1998 legislation that has redirected more than $4 billion in proceeds from the sale of public lands in Nevada to conservation initiatives, environmentally sensitive land acquisitions, new parks and trails, and capital projects for federal land management agencies.

Reid was criticized as one of the main culprits for the failure of the 2009 United Nations Climate Change Conference, as the Democrats' majority in Congress during that time had not been used to enact climate-protection legislation prior to the conference.

In 2015, Reid received a lifetime achievement award from the League of Conservation Voters, and the following year he was honored by the Conservation Lands Foundation for "historic contributions to conservation."

=== Criticism of Mitt Romney ===
During the summer of 2012, Reid said in an interview with The Huffington Post that he had received information from an unidentified investor in Bain Capital that presumptive Republican presidential nominee Mitt Romney did not pay any taxes for 10 years. He repeated the accusation on the Senate floor on August 2, 2012. According to CBS News, Romney stated, "Let me also say, categorically, I have paid taxes every year – and a lot of taxes. So Harry is simply wrong." PolitiFact.com's Truth-O-Meter rated the accusation as "Pants on Fire!" The Washington Post's Fact Checker gave it "Four Pinnocchios". CBS reported that Romney had submitted 23 years of tax returns to the John McCain campaign in 2008, when he was being vetted for the vice-presidential nomination. McCain said, "[n]othing in these tax returns showed that he did not pay taxes." In a 2015 interview on the subject, Reid said "Romney didn't win, did he?" The following year, Reid called the attack "one of the best things I've ever done," while reiterating that Romney had not released his tax returns. (Note: Romney released his returns in 2010 and 2011, which showed that he did pay taxes.) In 2021, Reid stated in an interview that after the 2012 election he and Mitt Romney and their wives met privately and reconciled, with Reid concluding that "I admire Mitt Romney. I think he's a very very fine human being."

== Cultural and political image ==
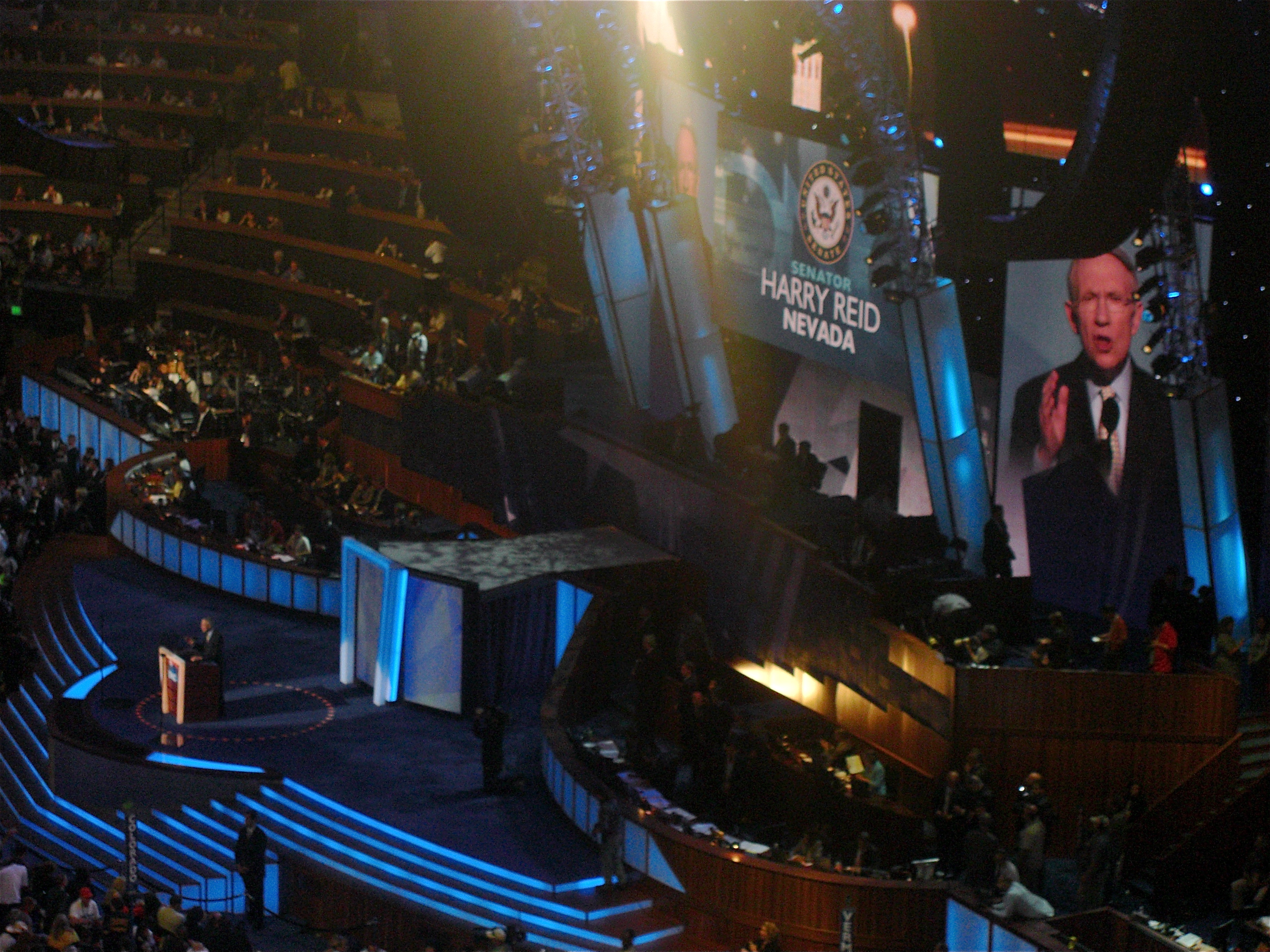
Reid speaks during the third night of the 2008 Democratic National Convention in Denver, Colorado.

Part of Reid's confrontation with Frank Rosenthal while chair of the Nevada Gaming Commission is reenacted in the 1995 movie Casino. Reid had a role in the movie Traffic (2000), in which he played himself. He appeared, with Senators Sam Brownback and Barack Obama, in the 2007 documentary film Sand and Sorrow, which details the genocide in Sudan.

Reid was elected to the Gaming Hall of Fame in 2001. In 2013, adviser Jim Margolis said of Reid, "He is unique in this city. And you see it in so many different ways. Is he the best TV talking head? No. He'd be the first to tell you that. Should he smile more? Yes. Should he say goodbye on the phone when he's done talking to you? Probably. But those are things you'd assume are part and parcel of a polished figure in Washington. That is not Harry Reid."

Reid was known for his skills in political organizing and getting out the vote, and his voter coalition known as the "Reid Machine" was credited with being the driving force behind several statewide Democratic wins, including Hillary Clinton in the 2016 United States presidential election in Nevada and Catherine Cortez Masto's election to succeed Reid in the concurrent Senate election. A veteran of the Reid political machine, Megan K. Jones, has gone on to be a senior advisor to vice president and 2024 Democratic presidential candidate Kamala Harris.

Harry Reid (formerly McCarran) International Airport, which serves the Las Vegas Valley, was named after Senator Reid on December 14, 2021, just two weeks prior to his death.

== Personal life ==
Reid met his wife, Landra Gould, in high school. Gould was from a Jewish family and her parents objected to the relationship because Reid was not Jewish. The two eloped in 1959 when they were in college. The Reids had five children; a daughter and four sons. Their eldest son, Rory, was an elected commissioner for Clark County, Nevada, of which he became chairman, and 2010 Democratic nominee in the election for Governor of Nevada. Another son, Josh Reid, unsuccessfully sought municipal office in Cottonwood Heights, Utah.

In 2014 financial disclosure reports, Reid reported a net worth of between $2.9 million and $9.3 million. Most of Reid's net worth was in municipal securities and in land and mineral rights in southern Nevada and Arizona; a blind trust managed the liquid assets of Reid and his wife.

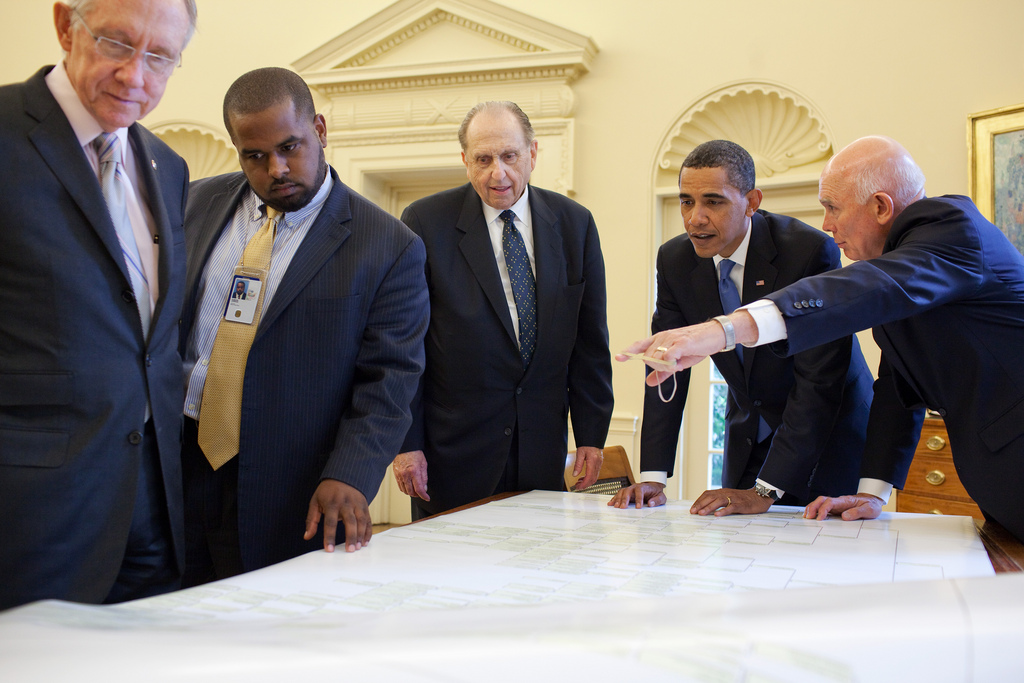
Harry Reid (far left) and LDS leaders Thomas S. Monson and Dallin H. Oaks (center and far right) presenting family history to U.S. President Barack Obama

Reid lived in the Anthem area of Henderson, Nevada. Reid (who was raised agnostic) and his wife (who was born to Jewish immigrant parents and grew up in Henderson) converted to the Church of Jesus Christ of Latter-day Saints while he was a college student. In a 2001 interview he said, "I think it is much easier to be a good member of the Church and a Democrat than a good member of the Church and a Republican." He went on to say that the Democrats' emphasis on helping others, as opposed to what he considered Republican dogma to the contrary, was the reason he was a Democrat. He delivered a speech at Brigham Young University to about 4,000 students on October 9, 2007, in which he expressed his opinion that Democratic values mirror Mormon values. Several Republican Mormons in Utah contested his faith because of his politics, such as his statements that the church's backing of California's Proposition 8 wasted resources.

Reid was the co-chairman of the Board of Selectors of Jefferson Awards for Public Service. In April 2015, Reid confirmed former U.S. Senator Larry Pressler as a member of The Church of Jesus Christ of Latter-day Saints.

== Health and death ==
=== Injury ===
On January 1, 2015, Reid was injured while exercising in his home—he said a piece of equipment he was using broke (later "slipped"), causing him to fall. As a result, he suffered broken ribs and broken facial bones, and was at risk of permanent vision loss in his right eye. On January 26, 2015, he underwent surgery to remove a blood clot from his right eye and repair facial bones. He later sued a company he claimed manufactured the device, alleging the device was defective. In 2019, a jury rejected his claim for lack of evidence.

=== Pancreatic cancer ===
On May 14, 2018, Reid had surgery for pancreatic cancer at Johns Hopkins Cancer Center after a tumor was found on his pancreas during a routine screening. In a January 2019 interview with The New York Times, it was revealed that he was confined to a desk at his home and was unable to move without the aid of a walker. Upon his diagnosis, he said: "As soon as you discover you have something on your pancreas, you're dead." On February 25, 2019, he announced that due to early detection and chemotherapy, his cancer was in remission.

=== Death ===
Reid died of pancreatic cancer at his home in Henderson on December 28, 2021, at the age of 82. Following the news of his death, President Joe Biden and former presidents Barack Obama and Bill Clinton gave tributes to Reid. Several of his former Senate colleagues also gave tributes, including Chuck Schumer, Patrick Leahy, Dick Durbin, Mitch McConnell, Chuck Grassley and Mike Lee as well as Nevada Governor Steve Sisolak. He lay in state in the Capitol Rotunda on January 12, 2022.

Funeral

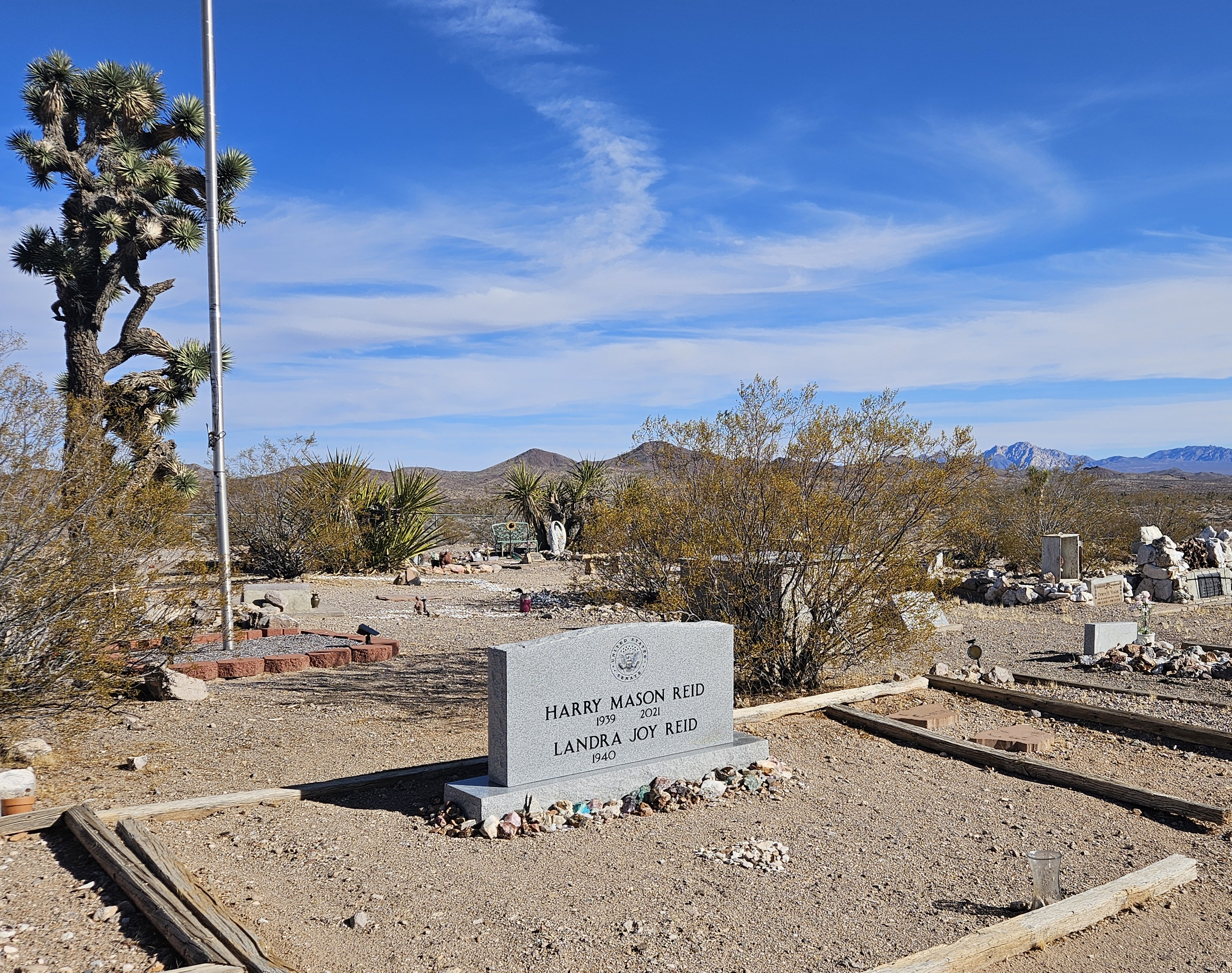
Headstone of Senator Harry Reid at Searchlight Cemetery. His parents' graves are to the right.

Reid's funeral was broadcast live on CNN and MSNBC with tributes by President Joe Biden, Barack Obama, Nancy Pelosi, Chuck Schumer and performances by Brandon Flowers and Carole King. He was interred in his family plot in Searchlight.

== Electoral history ==
1982 United States House of Representatives elections
Party	Candidate	Votes	%
Democratic	Harry Reid	61,901	57.54%
Republican	Peggy Cavnar	45,675	42.46%
Total votes		107,576	100.0%
Democratic win (new seat)			

1984 United States House of Representatives elections
Party	Candidate	Votes	%
Democratic	Harry Reid (incumbent)	73,242	56.12%
Republican	Peggy Cavnar	55,391	42.44%
Libertarian	Joe Morris	1,885	1.44%
Total votes		130,518	100.0%
Democratic hold			

1986 United States Senate elections
Party	Candidate	Votes	%	±%
Democratic	Harry Reid	130,955	50.00%	+12.61%
Republican	Jim Santini	116,606	44.52%	−14.01%
None of These Candidates		9,472	3.62%	+2.33%
Libertarian	Kent Cromwell	4,899	1.87%	−0.94%
Majority		14,349	5.48%	−15.66%
Turnout		261,932		
Democratic gain from Republican				

1992 United States Senate elections
Party	Candidate	Votes	%	±%
Democratic	Harry Reid (incumbent)	253,150	51.05%	+1.05%
Republican	Demar Dahl	199,413	40.21%	−4.30%
None of These Candidates		13,154	2.65%	−0.96%
Independent American	Joe S. Garcia	11,240	2.27%	N/A
Natural Law	Lois Avery	7,279	1.47%	N/A
Libertarian	Kent Cromwell	7,222	1.46%	−0.41%
Populist	Harry Tootle	4,429	0.89%	N/A
Majority		53,737	10.84%	+5.36%
Turnout		495,887		
Democratic hold				

1998 United States Senate elections
Party	Candidate	Votes	%	±%
Democratic	Harry Reid (incumbent)	208,650	47.88%	−3.19%
Republican	John Ensign	208,222	47.78%	+7.56%
Libertarian	Michael Cloud	8,129	1.87%	+0.41%
None of These Candidates		8,113	1.86%	−0.79%
Natural Law	Michael E. Williams	2,781	0.64%	−0.83%
Majority		401	0.09%	−10.74%
Turnout		435,864		
Democratic hold				

2004 United States Senate elections
Party	Candidate	Votes	%	±%
Democratic	Harry Reid (incumbent)	494,805	61.08%	+13.22%
Republican	Richard Ziser	284,640	35.14%	−12.63%
None of These Candidates		12,968	1.60%	−0.26%
Libertarian	Thomas L. Hurst	9,559	1.18%	−0.69%
Independent American Party (Nevada)	David K. Schumann	6,001	0.74%	N/A
Natural Law	Gary Marinch	2,095	0.26%	−0.38%
Majority		210,165	25.94%	+25.85%
Turnout		810,068		
Democratic hold				

Nevada Democratic primary results, 2010
Party	Candidate	Votes	%
Democratic	Harry Reid (incumbent)	87,401	75.3%
Democratic	None of these	12,341	10.6%
Democratic	Alex Miller	9,717	8.4%
Democratic	Eduardo Hamilton	4,645	4.0%
Democratic	Carlo Poliak	1,938	1.7%
Total votes		116,042	100.00%

2010 United States Senate elections
Party	Candidate	Votes	%	±%
Democratic	Harry Reid (incumbent)	362,785	50.29%	−10.84%
Republican	Sharron Angle	321,361	44.55%	+9.45%
None of These Candidates		16,174	2.25%	+0.65%
Tea Party of Nevada	Scott Ashjian	5,811	0.81%	N/A
Independent	Michael L. Haines	4,261	0.59%	N/A
Independent American	Timothy Fasano	3,185	0.44%	N/A
Independent	Jesse Holland	3,175	0.44%	N/A
Independent	Jeffery C. Reeves	2,510	0.35%	N/A
Independent	Wil Stand	2,119	0.29%	N/A
Majority		41,424	5.74%	
Total votes		721,381	100.00%	−11.14%
Democratic hold				

== Notes ==
Political offices
Preceded by Edward Fike	Lieutenant Governor of Nevada; 1971–1975	Succeeded by Robert E. Rose
Party political offices
Preceded by Alan Bible	Democratic nominee for U.S. Senator from Nevada (Class 3); 1974	Succeeded by Mary Gojack
Preceded by Mary Gojack	Democratic nominee for U.S. Senator from Nevada (Class 3); 1986, 1992, 1998, 2004, 2010	Succeeded by Catherine Cortez Masto
Preceded by Tom Daschle; George J. Mitchell	Chair of the Senate Democratic Policy Committee; 1995–1999; Served alongside: Tom Daschle	Succeeded by Byron Dorgan
Preceded by Wendell H. Ford	Senate Democratic Whip; 1999–2005	Succeeded by Dick Durbin
Preceded by Tom Daschle	Senate Democratic Leader; 2005–2017	Succeeded by Chuck Schumer
Preceded by Tom Daschle; Nancy Pelosi	Response to the State of the Union address 2005; Served alongside: Nancy Pelosi	Succeeded by Tim Kaine
U.S. House of Representatives
Preceded by James Santini; Nevada's at-large district	Member of the U.S. House of Representatives from Nevada's 1st congressional district 1983–1987	Succeeded by James Bilbray
U.S. Senate
Preceded by Paul Laxalt	U.S. Senator (Class 3) from Nevada; 1987–2017; Served alongside: Chic Hecht, Dick Bryan, John Ensign, Dean Heller	Succeeded by Catherine Cortez Masto
Preceded by Richard Bryan	Ranking Member of the Senate Ethics Committee; 1997–2001	Succeeded by Pat Roberts
Preceded by Wendell Ford	Senate Minority Whip; 1999–2001	Succeeded by Don Nickles
Preceded by Max Baucus	Ranking Member of the Senate Environment Committee; 2001	Succeeded by Bob Smith
Preceded by Don Nickles	Senate Majority Whip; 2001–2003	Succeeded by Mitch McConnell
Preceded by Pat Roberts	Chair of the Senate Ethics Committee; 2001–2003	Succeeded by George Voinovich
Preceded by Don Nickles	Senate Minority Whip; 2003–2005	Succeeded by Dick Durbin
Preceded by Tom Daschle	Senate Minority Leader; 2005–2007	Succeeded by Mitch McConnell
Preceded by Bill Frist	Senate Majority Leader; 2007–2015	Succeeded by Mitch McConnell
Preceded by Mitch McConnell	Senate Minority Leader; 2015–2017	Succeeded by Chuck Schumer
Honorary titles
Preceded by Bob Dole	Persons who have lain in state or honor in the United States Capitol rotunda January 12, 2022	Succeeded by Don Young
