= David Towell =

American politician (1937–2003)

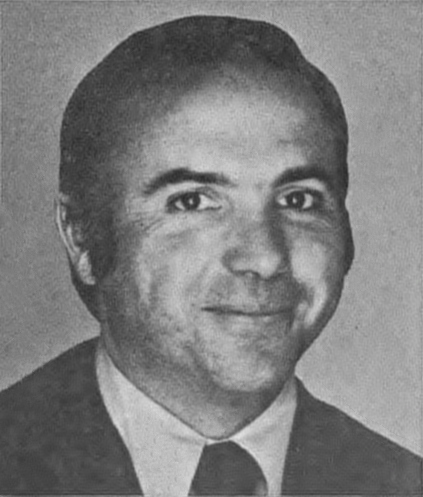

Member of the U.S. House of Representatives from Nevada's at-large district
- In office January 3, 1973 – January 3, 1975
- Preceded by: Walter S. Baring Jr.
- Succeeded by: James D. Santini

Personal details
- Born: June 9, 1937 Bronxville, New York, U.S.
- Died: June 10, 2003 (aged 66) Reno, Nevada, U.S.
- Party: Republican
- Profession: Real estate broker

David Gilmer Towell (June 9, 1937 – June 10, 2003) was an American politician who served a single term as a U.S. representative from Nevada, representing the state's at-large district. He was a Republican.

Born in Bronxville, New York, Towell was the son of a Canadian-born mother and an English-born father. He attended Bronxville and New York City public schools before earning a B.A. in economics at University of the Pacific in Stockton, California, in 1960. He served in the Nevada Air National Guard from 1960 to 1966.

A real estate broker by profession, Towell's prior political experience included serving as chairman of the Douglas County Republican Central Committee and as a delegate to the Nevada State Republican conventions in 1968, 1970, and 1972. He ran for the U.S. House of Representatives in 1972, expecting to face eight-term conservative incumbent Democrat Walter Baring in the general election. However, Baring was defeated in the Democratic primary by a considerably more liberal Democrat, James Bilbray. Boosted by the divided opposition, a late endorsement from Baring himself, and Richard Nixon's national landslide, Towell won by a narrow margin.

In 1974, Towell ran for reelection, but was soundly defeated by a more conservative Democrat, former judge Jim Santini. Towell ran for the U.S. Senate in 1976 against incumbent Democrat Howard Cannon, but lost by an overwhelming margin. Afterwards, he resumed the real estate business.

Towell died of cancer on June 10, 2003, at Washoe County Medical Center in Reno.

Party political offices
Preceded by William Raggio	Republican nominee for U.S. Senator from Nevada (Class 1); 1976	Succeeded by Chic Hecht
U.S. House of Representatives
Preceded by Walter S. Baring Jr.	Member of the U.S. House of Representatives from Nevada's at-large congressional district 1973–1975	Succeeded by James D. Santini
