= Walter S. Baring Jr. =

American politician (1911–1975)

Walter Baring
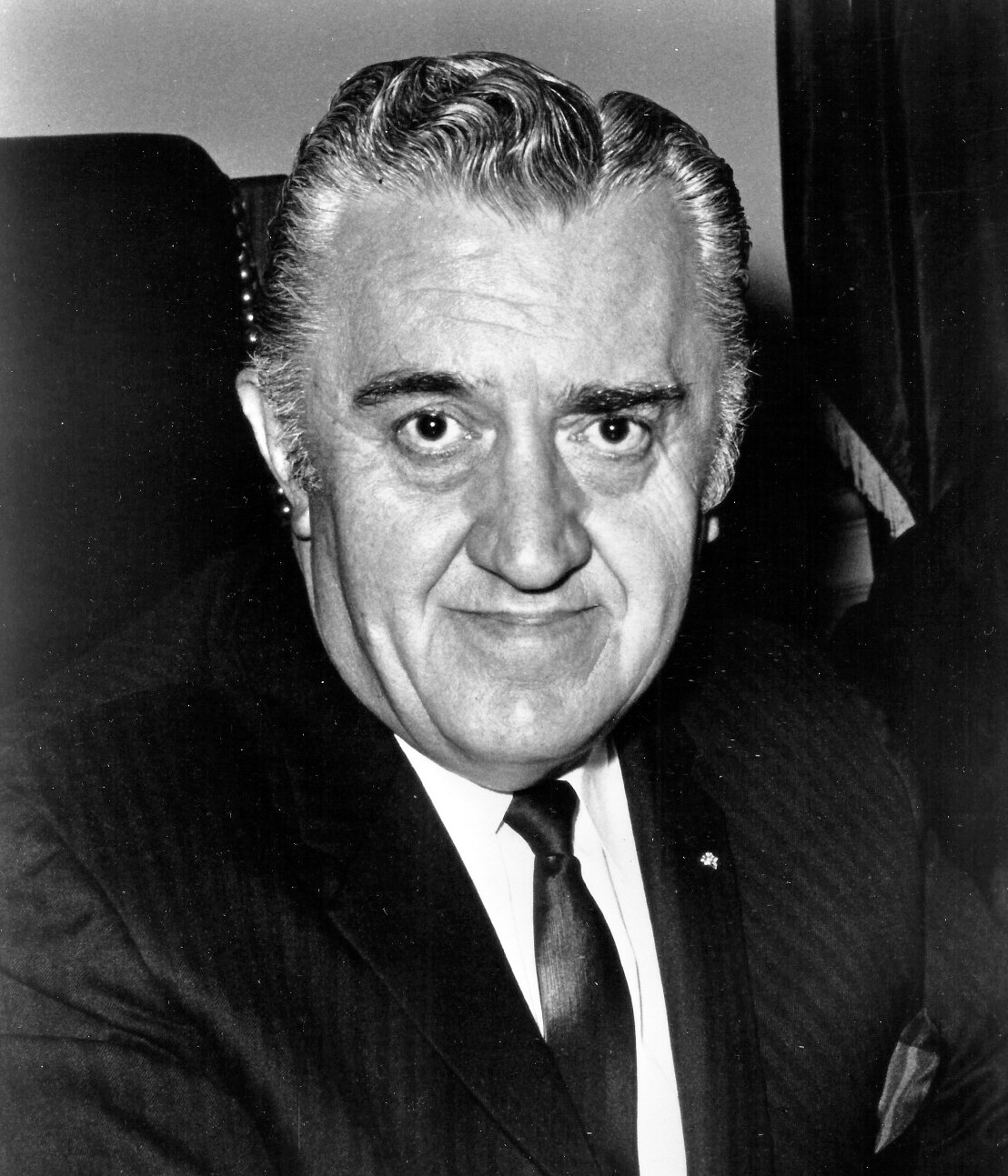
- Official portrait, 1972

Member of the U.S. House of Representatives from Nevada's at-large district
- In office January 3, 1957 – January 3, 1973
- Preceded by: Clift Young
- Succeeded by: David Towell
- In office January 3, 1949 – January 3, 1953
- Preceded by: Charles H. Russell
- Succeeded by: Clift Young

Personal details
- Born: Walter Stephan Baring, Jr. September 9, 1911 Goldfield, Nevada, U.S.
- Died: July 13, 1975 (aged 63) Los Angeles, California, U.S.
- Party: Democratic
- Spouse: Geraldine Buchanan
- Children: 4
- Education: University of Nevada, Reno (BA, BS)

Walter Stephan Baring Jr. (September 9, 1911 – July 13, 1975) was an American politician who served ten terms as a United States representative from Nevada during the mid-20th century.

== Early life ==
Baring was born in Goldfield, Nevada, to Emily L. and Walter Stephan Baring, his paternal grandparents were born in Germany and his maternal grandfather was from Bohemia. His father served on the Esmeralda County Commission for a while, until he moved the family to Reno. His father then managed a furniture store.

=== Education ===
Baring graduated from the University of Nevada in 1934 with two bachelor's degrees. After graduating, he worked as a collector for the U.S. Internal Revenue Service.

=== Naval Service ===
In 1943, Baring joined the United States Navy to serve during World War II.

== Political career ==
Baring served as a Member of the Nevada Assembly in 1936. He was subsequently reelected before joining the war effort. After the war, he was elected to the Reno City Council.

During the presidency of Franklin Roosevelt, Baring strongly criticized the President's court-packing plan for the United States Supreme Court.

== Congressional elections ==
Baring was first elected to Nevada's sole seat in the House of Representatives in 1948, unseating first-term Republican incumbent Charles H. Russell by 761 votes. He was reelected in 1950, but in 1952, he was unexpectedly defeated by Republican Cliff Young, who won that election by 771 votes. Baring ran against Young again in 1954, but Young again managed a narrow victory. In 1956, Young ran for the U.S. Senate against incumbent Democrat Alan Bible, who narrowly defeated him in the general election. That same year, Baring ran for Congress again, defeating Las Vegas City Attorney Howard Cannon in the Democratic primary before winning the general election. Baring was reelected in a landslide in 1958, while Cannon was elected to the U.S. Senate.

== Tenure in Congress ==
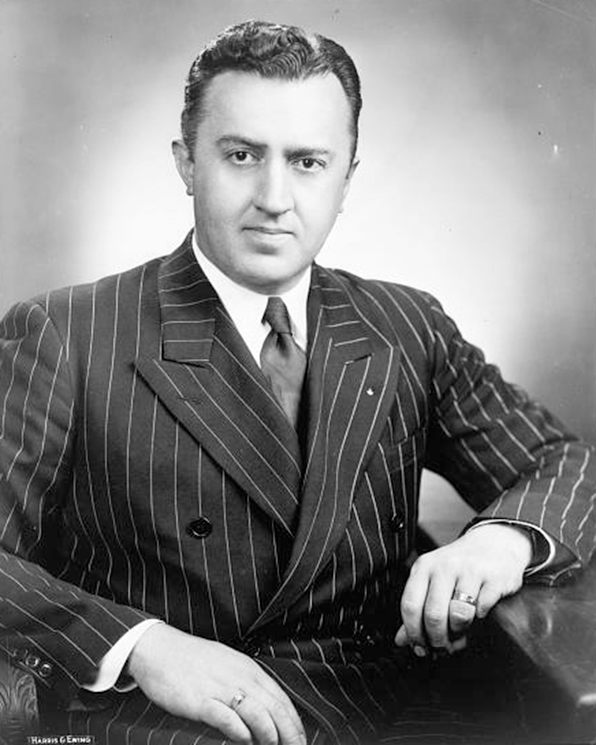
A younger portrait of Baring in 1956.

During his first two terms in Congress, Baring compiled a liberal voting record. After his return, however, he veered considerably to the right, billing himself as a "Jeffersonian States' Rights Democrat." He usually voted with the conservative Southern wing of his party. He was critical of John F. Kennedy and voted against most of Lyndon Johnson's Great Society programs. This angered many in his own party, and Baring often claimed, "No one likes Walter Baring but the voters." He was known to equate liberalism with socialism and Communism, and opposed foreign aid of any sort.

During the 1960s, Baring faced stronger opposition in Democratic primary elections than in general elections, owing to his ability to attract large numbers of registered Republicans, especially in the northwest of the state. In the Democratic primary contests, Baring was able to run up enough of a margin in the "Cow Counties" (the more rural parts of Nevada) to overcome large deficits in Clark and Washoe counties (home to Las Vegas and Reno, respectively).

=== Segregation activist ===
Baring contended that the Civil Rights Movement was influenced by Communists. He was nearly defeated for renomination in 1964 after leading the opposition to the Civil Rights Act of 1964.

=== Defeat and exit from Congress ===
In 1972, Baring was narrowly defeated in the Democratic primary by a considerably more liberal Democrat, Las Vegas attorney and future Congressman James Bilbray. By this time Clark and Washoe counties were well into a period of explosive growth that continues today, and Bilbray's margin in those counties was too much for Baring to overcome. Claiming that Bilbray had smeared him, Baring endorsed the Republican nominee, David Towell, helping him win the general election in an upset.

== Later years and death ==
After leaving Congress, Baring remained interested in politics, even flirting with a run for governor in 1974. However, a bout of emphysema and heart strain ended that prospect. After undergoing surgery at Hollywood Presbyterian Medical Center in Los Angeles, he died of heart and lung failure on July 13, 1975, at the age of 63.

== Education ==
- High school teacher's certificate
- University of Nevada at Reno, B.A. and B.S., 1934
- Reno High School, 1929

U.S. House of Representatives
Preceded by Charles H. Russell	Member of the U.S. House of Representatives from Nevada's at-large congressional district 1949–1953	Succeeded by Clift Young
Preceded by Clift Young	Member of the U.S. House of Representatives from Nevada's at-large congressional district 1957–1973	Succeeded by David Towell
