= James David Santini =

American politician (1937–2015)

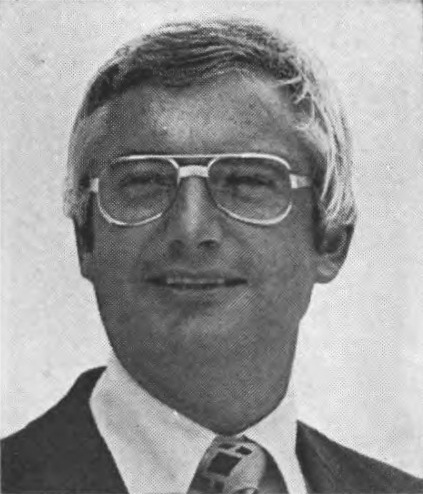

Member of the U.S. House of Representatives from Nevada's at-large district
- In office January 3, 1975 – January 3, 1983
- Preceded by: David Towell
- Succeeded by: Harry Reid (1st district); Barbara Vucanovich (2nd district)

Personal details
- Born: August 13, 1937 Reno, Nevada, U.S.
- Died: September 22, 2015 (aged 78) Rockville, Maryland, U.S.
- Party: Democratic (until 1986); Republican (after 1986)
- Education: University of Nevada, Reno (BA); University of California, Hastings (JD)

James David Santini (August 13, 1937 – September 22, 2015) was an American attorney, politician and lobbyist who served as the U.S. representative for Nevada's at-large congressional district from 1975 to 1983. He was a member of the Democratic Party until 1986, when he joined the Republican Party.

== Early life and education ==
Born in Reno, Nevada, Santini graduated from Bishop Manogue High School in 1955 and attended the University of Nevada, Reno, where he was a member of Alpha Tau Omega fraternity. He earned his Juris Doctor from the University of California, Hastings College of the Law in 1962 and was admitted to the Nevada state bar in the same year, as well as California in 1963 and Arizona in 1966.

== Career ==
Santini served in the United States Army from 1963 to 1966. Santini served consecutively as Clark County, Nevada deputy district attorney (1966–1968), Clark County public defender (1968–1970), Las Vegas justice of the peace (1970–1972) and as a district court judge of Clark County (1972–1974). He was also owner and a teacher of the Nevada Bar Review from 1969 to 1974.

=== Congress ===
Santini was elected to the U.S. House in 1974, unseating incumbent Republican David Towell. He served from 1975 to 1983 as a Democrat representing the state's at-large district. In Congress, Santini compiled a moderate-to-conservative record and won reelection by overwhelming margins. Santini ran for the United States Senate in 1982, but was narrowly defeated in the Democratic primary by incumbent Howard Cannon. Cannon then lost the general election to former state Senator Chic Hecht.

Santini was the last person to represent the entire state in the U.S. House, as reapportionment gave Nevada two Congressional seats as of the 1982 Congressional election. He was succeeded by Democrat Harry Reid and Republican Barbara Vucanovich in the newly created 1st and 2nd Congressional Districts respectively.

In 1986, he switched to the Republican Party and ran for the Senate seat then being vacated by the retiring Paul Laxalt. Although Santini won the Republican nomination easily, he lost the general election to Reid by 14,349 votes.

=== Later career ===
After leaving public office, Santini remained in Washington, D.C., and worked as a lobbyist, representing a number of tourism-related corporations. Among his major clients were the National Tour Association, which retained him as a legislative counsel for government issues related to the national and international tourism industry. Santini had been the federal legislation and regulation Washington, D.C., representative for NTA since 1983.

== Personal life ==
In 1990, Santini and his family appeared as contestants on the nighttime version of Family Feud. One of his aides appeared in a 1980 episode of the series and mentioned his name several times. Show host Richard Dawson made light of the Abscam sting operation during the opening segment of the episode. His aide confirmed that Santini was not involved and was a "good guy". His aide's family lost the game to the returning champions.

== Death ==
Santini died on September 22, 2015, in Rockville, Maryland, from esophageal cancer. He was 78.

Party political offices
| Preceded by Paul Laxalt | Republican nominee for U.S. Senator from Nevada (Class 3); 1986 | Succeeded by Demar Dahl |
U.S. House of Representatives
| Preceded by David Towell | Member of the U.S. House of Representatives from Nevada's at-large congressional district 1975–1983 | Succeeded by Harry Reid (1st District); Barbara Vucanovich (2nd District) |
