= 1974 United States Senate election in Nevada =

- November 5, 1974
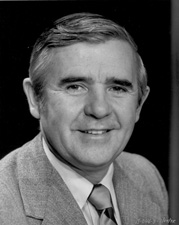

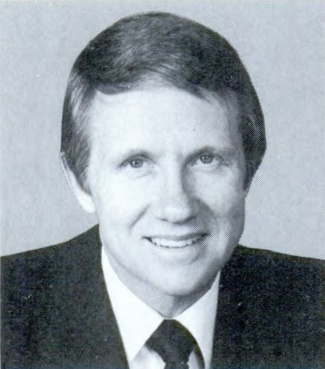

Nominee	Paul Laxalt	Harry Reid	Jack C. Doyle
Party	Republican	Democratic	IAPN
Popular vote	79,605	78,981	10,887
Percentage	46.97%	46.60%	6.42%
- County results Laxalt: 40–50% 50–60% 60–70% Reid: 40–50% 50–60%
U.S. senator before election
Alan Bible
Democratic
Elected U.S. Senator
Paul Laxalt
Republican

The 1974 United States Senate election in Nevada was held on November 5, 1974. Incumbent Democratic U.S. Senator Alan Bible decided to retire instead of seeking a fourth full term. Republican nominee Paul Laxalt won the open seat.

Paul Laxalt, former governor (1967–1971) and former lieutenant governor of Nevada (1963–1967), won by less than 700 votes over incumbent Lieutenant Governor Harry Reid, becoming one of the few bright spots in a bad year for Republicans. This was the only seat that flipped from Democratic to Republican. Bible resigned three weeks early (on December 17, 1974) and one day later Nevada Democratic Governor Mike O'Callaghan appointed Laxalt to finish out that term. When Laxalt retired in 1986, Reid won the seat that he lost in this election. This was the first time since 1926 that Republicans were elected to this seat.

== Results ==
General election results
Party	Candidate	Votes	%	±%
Republican	Paul Laxalt	79,605	46.97%	+1.73%
Democratic	Harry Reid	78,981	46.60%	−8.16%
Independent American Party (Nevada)	Jack C. Doyle	10,887	6.42%	
Majority		624	0.37%	−9.15%
Turnout		169,473		
Republican gain from Democratic				

== See also ==
- United States Senate elections, 1974 and 1975
