= Washington, Perito & Dubuc =

Washington, Perito & Dubuc was a United States law firm founded in 1987 as Laxalt, Washington, Perito & Dubuc. It was founded by Paul Laxalt and Robert B. Washington Jr. It was described by Paul Laxalt in 1987 as "essentially the Washington office" of Finley, Kumble, Wagner, Underberg, Manley, Myerson & Casey, a law firm that went bankrupt that year with substantial debt. Washington, Perito & Dubuc disbanded in August 1991, having lost nearly half its 110 lawyers since fall 1990, hit by the recession. Laxalt had left the company in January 1990 after the firm took on the government of Angola as a client. Other clients included Bank of Credit and Commerce International.
