= Joanne L. Goodwin =

American historian

Joanne L. Goodwin (born August 23, 1949) is an American historian and professor emerita in the Department of History at the University of Nevada, Las Vegas (UNLV). Her areas of expertise include historical methods, American women's and gender history, oral history, and the history of women in the American West, with a particular regional focus on Las Vegas.

== Education and academic career ==
Goodwin earned a Bachelor of Fine Arts from the University of Washington, a master's degree from Sarah Lawrence College, and a Ph.D. from the University of Michigan. She joined UNLV in 1991.

While at the University of Michigan, Goodwin received an Albert J. Beveridge Grant from the American Historical Association in 1988 for the research project Gender, Politics, and Welfare Reform in Chicago, 1900–1930.

In 1997, she published her monograph Gender and the Politics of Welfare Reform: Mothers’ Pensions in Chicago, 1911–1929. The book examines the origins and implementation of mothers’ pensions in Chicago, focusing, among other things, on the relationship between gender and social policy. It also considers the influence of paid work and marital status, as well as disparities in access to social assistance. In the years that followed, the monograph was reviewed in publications such as the Journal of American History, Social Forces, and the Journal of Social History.

== Research and public history ==
Around 1994, the Las Vegas Women Oral History Project began conducting interviews. The project was launched in response to the lack of sources on the history of women in Las Vegas. It aimed to document women’s personal life stories and memories through oral history. Under Goodwin's direction, the project initially involved graduate students and later developed in cooperation with the History Department and the Women’s Research Institute of Nevada (WRIN), which was recognized as a statewide research institute in Nevada in 1999. Goodwin served as executive director of WRIN from 1999 to 2017. Materials from the oral history project were transferred to UNLV Special Collections and Archives.

In 2014, Goodwin published the monograph Changing the Game: Women at Work in Las Vegas, 1940–1990 with the University of Nevada Press. In the book, Goodwin examines the history of working women in Las Vegas from 1940 to 1990. Her research is based, in part, on oral history interviews from the Las Vegas Women Oral History Project. She focuses on women in the gambling and entertainment industries as well as in other sectors, and examines issues related to paid work, gender, and social change in Las Vegas. The monograph was reviewed in publications such as the Journal of American History and the Western Historical Quarterly.

Also in 2014, the Women’s Research Institute of Nevada (WRIN) and Vegas PBS collaborated on the television documentary series MAKERS: Women in Nevada History, which premiered in October 2014 as a three-episode series. The series was based on WRIN’s extensive research on the history of women in Nevada. Covering approximately 100 years of Nevada history, MAKERS explored the role of women in fields such as women's suffrage, politics, education, the economy, and the gaming and entertainment industries. Goodwin was involved in the development of the documentary series.

The Women in Nevada History Legacy Digital Project brings together materials from several research projects, including the Nevada Women’s Archives, the Las Vegas Women Oral History Project, and MAKERS: Women in Nevada History. On the associated platform, Women in Nevada History, biographical information about women in Nevada is made available online in various formats, such as text, images, audio, and video, for research and teaching purposes.

In 2016, Goodwin was elected to the board of directors of the National Collaborative for Women’s History Sites. From 2019 to 2020, Goodwin served as the Nevada coordinator for the National Votes for Women Trail. This project by the National Collaborative for Women’s History Sites documents historically significant sites related to the women's suffrage movement. As part of this effort, Goodwin documented 67 sites in Nevada for the digital map and was involved in the installation of five historical markers commemorating the women’s suffrage movement in Nevada.

== Selected works ==
=== Monographs ===
- Gender and the Politics of Welfare Reform: Mothers’ Pensions in Chicago, 1911–1929. University of Chicago Press, Chicago, 1997.
- Changing the Game: Women at Work in Las Vegas, 1940–1990. University of Nevada Press, Reno, 2014.

=== Edited works ===
- General editor of vol. 3, Suffrage, World War, and Modern Times, 1900–Present, in Joyce Appleby, Eileen K. Cheng, and Joanne L. Goodwin (eds.), Encyclopedia of Women in American History. 3 vols., M. E. Sharpe, 2002.

=== Selected articles ===
- "Mapping Nevada’s Suffrage Campaigns." Nevada Historical Society Quarterly, vol. 64, nos. 1–2, 2020, pp. 19–36.
- "Nevada’s Campaigns for Woman Suffrage." Western Legal History, vol. 30, nos. 1–2, 2019, pp. 115–123.
- "From the Ground Up: Building Archival Sources for the History of Women in Las Vegas." Nevada Historical Society Quarterly, vol. 49, no. 4, 2006, pp. 263–276.
- "Mojave Mirages: Gender and Performance in Las Vegas." Women’s History Review, vol. 11, no. 1, 2002, pp. 115–132. doi:10.1080/09612020200200313
- "‘Employable Mothers’ and ‘Suitable Work’: A Re-evaluation of Welfare and Wage-earning for Women in the Twentieth-Century United States." Journal of Social History, vol. 29, no. 2, 1995, pp. 253–274. doi:10.1353/jsh/29.2.253
