= 1970 Nevada gubernatorial election =

- November 3, 1970
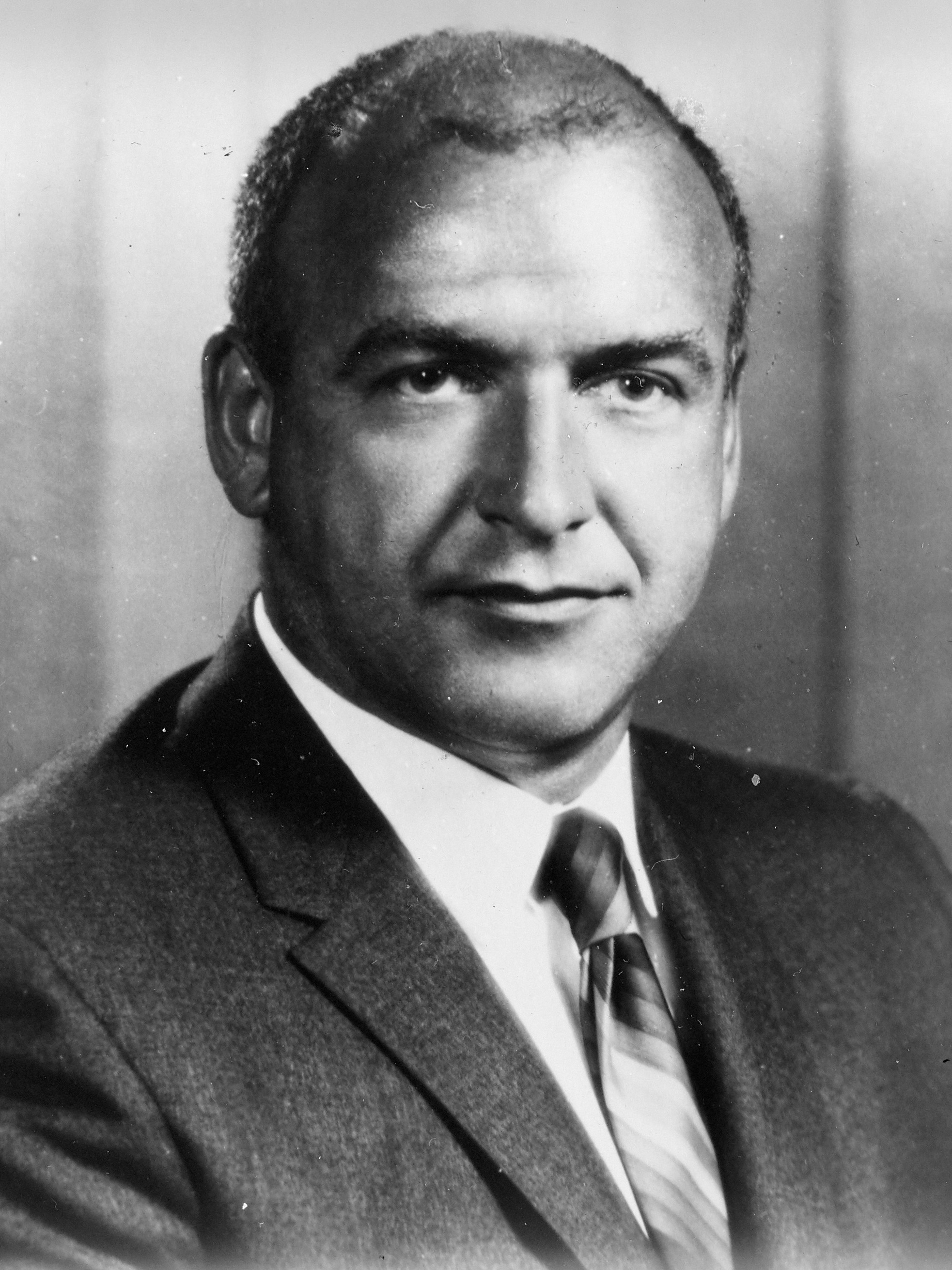

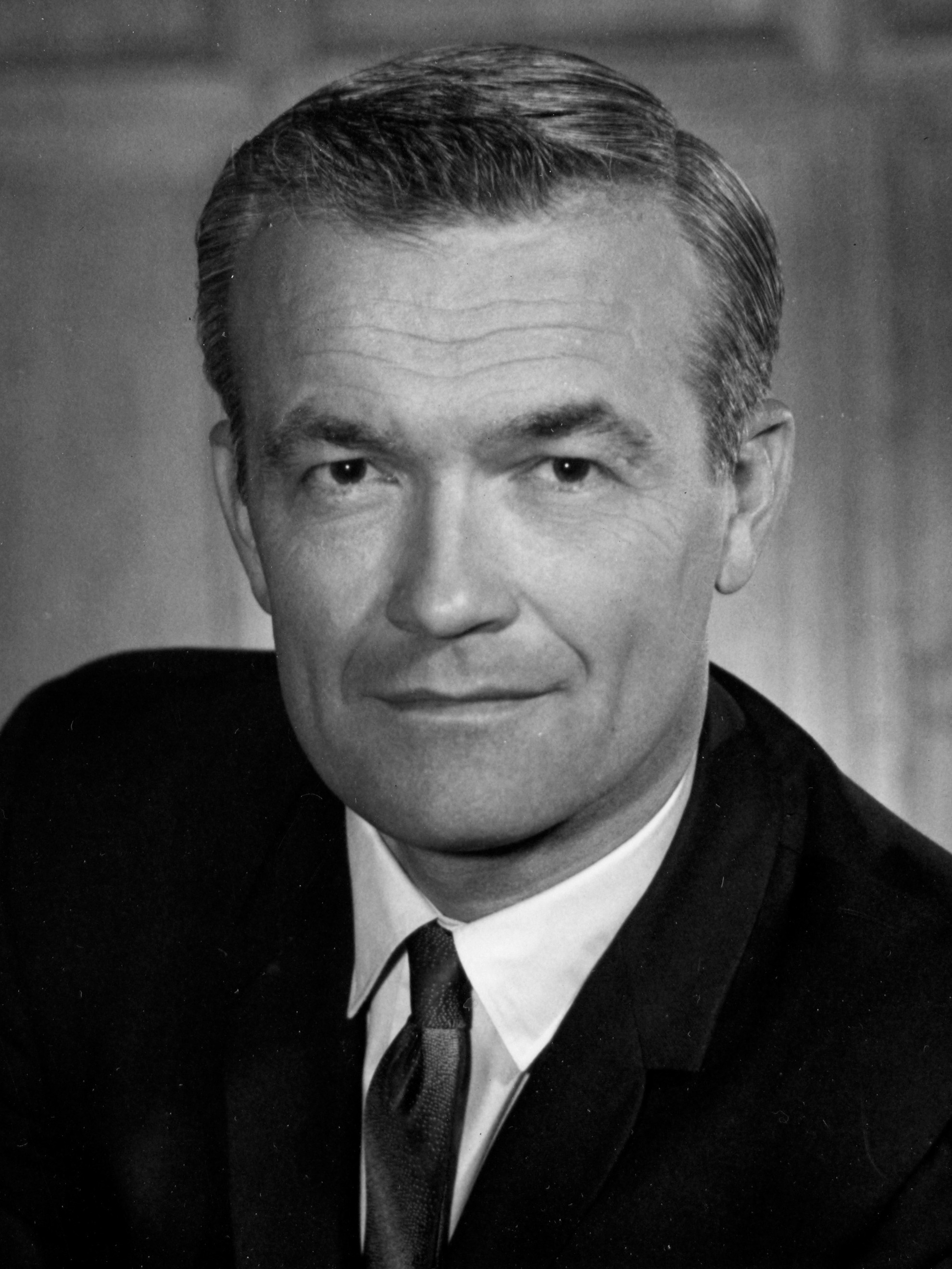
Nominee	Mike O'Callaghan	Ed Fike
Party	Democratic	Republican
Popular vote	70,697	64,400
Percentage	48.10%	43.81%
- County results O'Callaghan: 40–50% 50–60% 60–70% Fike: 40–50% 50–60%
Governor before election
Paul Laxalt
Republican
Elected Governor
Mike O'Callaghan
Democratic

The 1970 Nevada gubernatorial election occurred on November 3, 1970. Incumbent Republican Paul Laxalt did not run for re-election to a second term as Governor of Nevada. Democratic nominee Mike O'Callaghan defeated Republican nominee Ed Fike to succeed him.

== Primary elections ==
Primary elections were held on September 1, 1970.

=== Republican primary ===
==== Candidates ====
- Margie Dyer
- Ed Fike

==== Results ====
Republican primary results
Party	Candidate	Votes	%
Republican	Ed Fike	31,931	88.18%
Republican	Margie Dyer	4,281	11.82%
Total votes		36,212	100.00%

=== Democratic primary ===
==== Candidates ====
- Mike O'Callaghan
- Hank Thornley
- Albert "Al" D. Viller
- Don J. Weber

==== Results ====
Democratic primary results
Party	Candidate	Votes	%
Democratic	Mike O'Callaghan	41,185	68.77%
Democratic	Hank Thornley	16,107	26.89%
Democratic	Don J. Weber	1,299	2.17%
Democratic	Albert "Al" D. Viller	1,298	2.17%
Total votes		59,889	100.00%

== General election ==
=== Candidates ===
- Mike O'Callaghan, Democratic
- Ed Fike, Republican
- Charles E. Springer, Independent
- Daniel M. Hansen, Independent American

Nevada gubernatorial election, 1970
Party	Candidate	Votes	%	±%
Democratic	Mike O'Callaghan	70,697	48.10%	+0.25%
Republican	Ed Fike	64,400	43.81%	−8.34%
Independent	Charles E. Springer	6,479	4.41%	+4.41%
Independent American	Daniel M. Hansen	5,415	3.68%	+3.68%
Majority		6,297	4.28%	
Total votes		146,991	100.00%	
Democratic gain from Republican		Swing	+8.60%	

=== County results ===
County	Mike O'Callaghan Democratic		Ed Fike Republican		Charles E. Springer Independent		Daniel M. Hansen Independent American		Margin		Total votes cast
County	#	%	#	%	#	%	#	%	#	%	Total votes cast
Carson City	2,401	42.40%	2,812	49.66%	274	4.84%	176	3.11%	-411	7.26%	5,663
Churchill	1,667	46.53%	1,661	46.36%	126	3.52%	129	3.60%	6	0.17%	3,583
Clark	35,855	50.39%	30,801	43.28%	2,071	2.91%	2,432	3.42%	5,054	7.10%	71,159
Douglas	936	34.39%	1,630	59.88%	96	3.53%	60	2.20%	-694	-25.50%	2,722
Elko	2,344	53.26%	1,855	42.15%	88	2.00%	114	2.59%	489	11.11%	4,401
Esmeralda	189	49.87%	172	45.38%	15	3.96%	3	0.79%	17	4.49%	379
Eureka	207	44.52%	232	49.89%	7	1.51%	19	4.09%	-25	-5.38%	465
Humboldt	1,106	50.25%	973	44.21%	55	2.50%	67	3.04%	133	6.04%	2,201
Lander	524	52.98%	388	39.23%	33	3.34%	44	4.45%	136	13.75%	989
Lincoln	701	55.07%	534	41.95%	19	1.49%	19	1.49%	167	13.12%	1,273
Lyon	1,452	48.45%	1,370	45.71%	95	3.17%	80	2.67%	82	2.74%	2,997
Mineral	1,702	60.98%	782	28.02%	151	5.41%	156	5.59%	920	32.96%	2,791
Nye	1,023	53.48%	763	39.88%	67	3.50%	60	3.14%	260	13.59%	1,913
Pershing	543	47.05%	541	46.88%	42	3.64%	28	2.43%	2	0.17%	1,154
Storey	331	61.30%	170	31.48%	22	4.07%	17	3.15%	161	29.81%	540
Washoe	17,760	43.19%	18,265	44.42%	3,237	7.87%	1,860	4.52%	-505	-1.23%	41,122
White Pine	1,956	53.75%	1,451	39.87%	81	2.23%	151	4.15%	505	13.88%	3,639
Totals	70,697	48.10%	64,400	43.81%	6,479	4.41%	5,415	3.68%	6,297	4.28%	146,991

==== Counties that flipped from Republican to Democratic ====
- Churchill
- Humboldt
- Lincoln
- Lyon
- Pershing
