= Edward Fike =

American politician

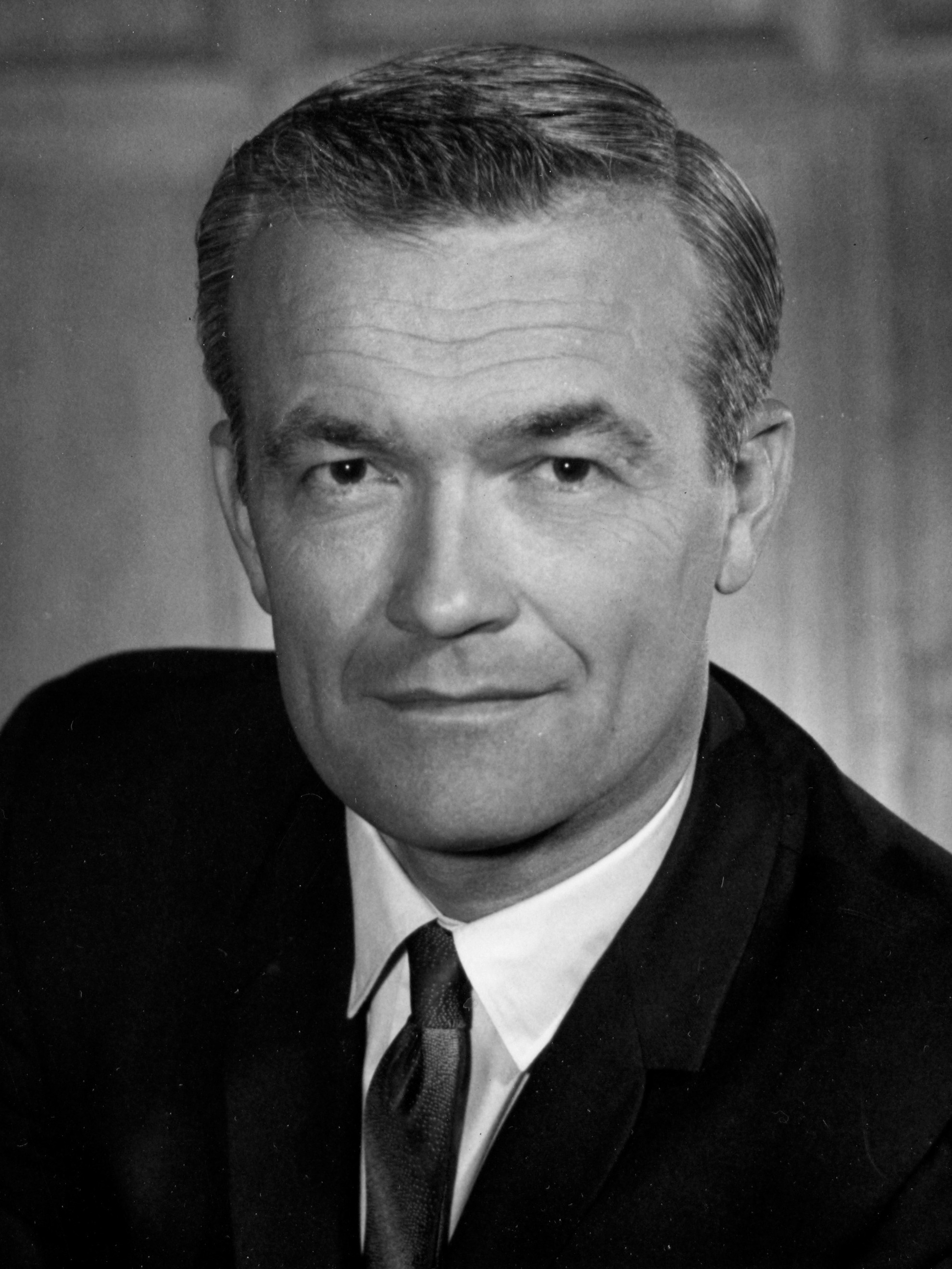
- Fike c. 1970s

24th Lieutenant Governor of Nevada
- In office January 2, 1967 – January 4, 1971
- Governor: Paul Laxalt
- Preceded by: Paul Laxalt
- Succeeded by: Harry Reid

Assemblyman of the Nevada Legislature from Clark County
- In office January 4, 1965 – January 2, 1967

Personal details
- Born: Merlin Edward Fike; February 5, 1925 Hopkins, Missouri, US
- Died: February 19, 2018 (aged 93) Las Vegas, Nevada, US
- Party: Republican

Merlin Edward Fike (February 5, 1925 – February 19, 2018) was an American politician from Nevada who served as the state's 24th lieutenant governor from 1967 to 1971 and also unsuccessfully ran for senate in 1968 and for governor in 1970.

== Biography ==
Fike was born on February 5, 1925, in Hopkins Missouri, to Frances Myrle Fike, nee Mahan, and Edward E. Fike. After graduating from high-school, Fike served in the United States Marine Corps during both World War II and the Korean War. Following his discharge he moved to Las Vegas, Nevada, being a permanent resident of the state since 1948.

Fike was the founder, President, and CEO of Lawyers Title of Las Vegas and Nevada Escrow Service from 1960 to 1984. Fike first became involved in politics in 1964 when he ran for a seat in the Nevada Legislature. After serving two terms there Fike was elected lieutenant governor. In Nevada, the offices of governor and lieutenant governor are elected independently of one another, and after Fike defeated his Democratic opponent, John Foley, in the 1966 lieutenant governor election, he had just an 80 vote margin between him and his Republican counterpart for governor Paul Laxalt, serving for a term from 1967 to 1971.

Fike would seek higher office, running as the Republican candidate in the 1968 United States Senate election in Nevada, where he ran against incumbent Democrat Alan Bible, who had a close relationship with then President Lyndon B. Johnson, including voting consistently in favor of the Vietnam War. Fike ran on an anti-war platform, while Bible touted Pork barrel projects and the benefits of the Great Society. Bible won by nearly 15,000 votes.

Fike would try again, running for governor in 1970, after Laxalt announced he was retiring from politics after just one term. Fike's Democratic opponent was Mike O'Callaghan, who lost in the Democratic primary in 1966 to Foley, marking the 1970 election as the first gubernatorial election between two residents from Clark County. For most of the election Fike was the front-runner and the favorite to win, however, late in the campaign allegations surfaced of corruption involving land deals near the Colorado River, which combined with the massive grassroots door-knocking effort by Foley resulted in a Democratic upset, with Fike losing by almost 6,000 votes.

After his defeat Fike largely retired from politics, although he served as a Republican National Committeeman from 1980 to 1985. After 1970 Fike became President of the Nevada Development Authority, but spent most of his time working as President of the Boulder Dam Area Council of Boy Scouts. Ed Fike married Doris Butts, nee Stewart, in 1950 and had a son, Gary Fike, in 1951. Ed was already a step-father to Kathleen Butts, b. 1948. Ed then married Joann Pulliam, nee Dayton, in 1957, and became step-father to three more children, Toni Pulliam, Michael Pulliam and Gary Pulliam. Together, Ed and Joann had one child, Brian Fike, in 1958. Ed Fike would die at home on February 19, 2018.

Political offices
Preceded by Paul Laxalt	Lieutenant Governor of Nevada; January 2, 1967 – January 4, 1971	Succeeded by Harry Reid
Party political offices
Preceded by Paul Laxalt	Republican nominee for Lieutenant Governor of Nevada; 1966	Succeeded by ???
Preceded by William B. Wright	Republican nominee for U.S. Senator from Nevada; 1968	Succeeded by Paul Laxalt
Preceded by Paul Laxalt	Republican nominee for Governor of Nevada; 1970	Succeeded by Shirley Crumpler
