= Federal Building and U.S. Courthouse (Reno, Nevada) =

- U.S. National Register of Historic Places
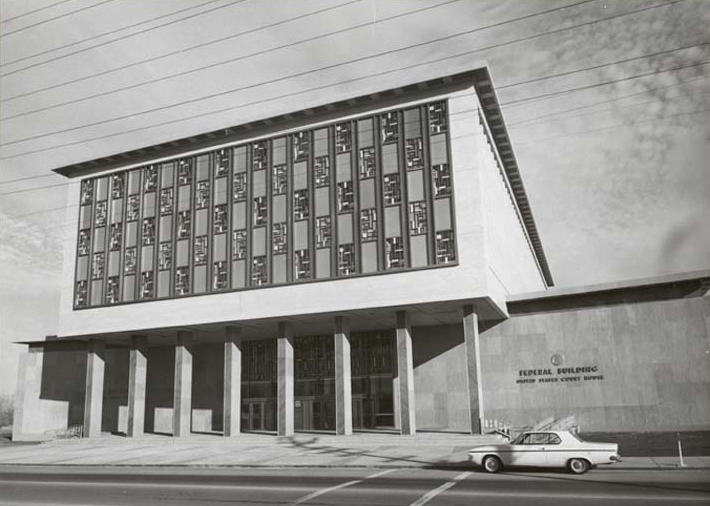

- Location within Nevada Location within the United States
- Location: 300 Booth St., Reno, Nevada
- Coordinates: 39°31′05″N 119°49′35″W
- Built: 1965
- Architectural style: Moderne
- NRHP reference No.: 100006290
- Added to NRHP: March 22, 2021

The Federal Building and U.S. Courthouse, also known as the C. Clifton Young Federal Building, in Reno, Nevada, is a historic courthouse and Federal building which was built in 1965. It was renamed in honor of Clarence Clifton Young in 1988. It is located at 300 Booth St.

It was listed on the National Register of Historic Places in 2021.

The building's lobby features a mural, "Life Before the Frontier Era", painted by Richard Guy Walton.

Major tenants are the U.S. Bankruptcy Court, U.S. Tax Court, U.S. Marshals Service, U.S. Trustees, Defense Contract Management Agency, U.S. Department of Labor, Federal Protective Service, U.S. Army Corps of Engineers, GSA, SSA Office of Hearing Operations (OHO), and TSA.
