= 1968 United States Senate election in Nevada =

- November 5, 1968
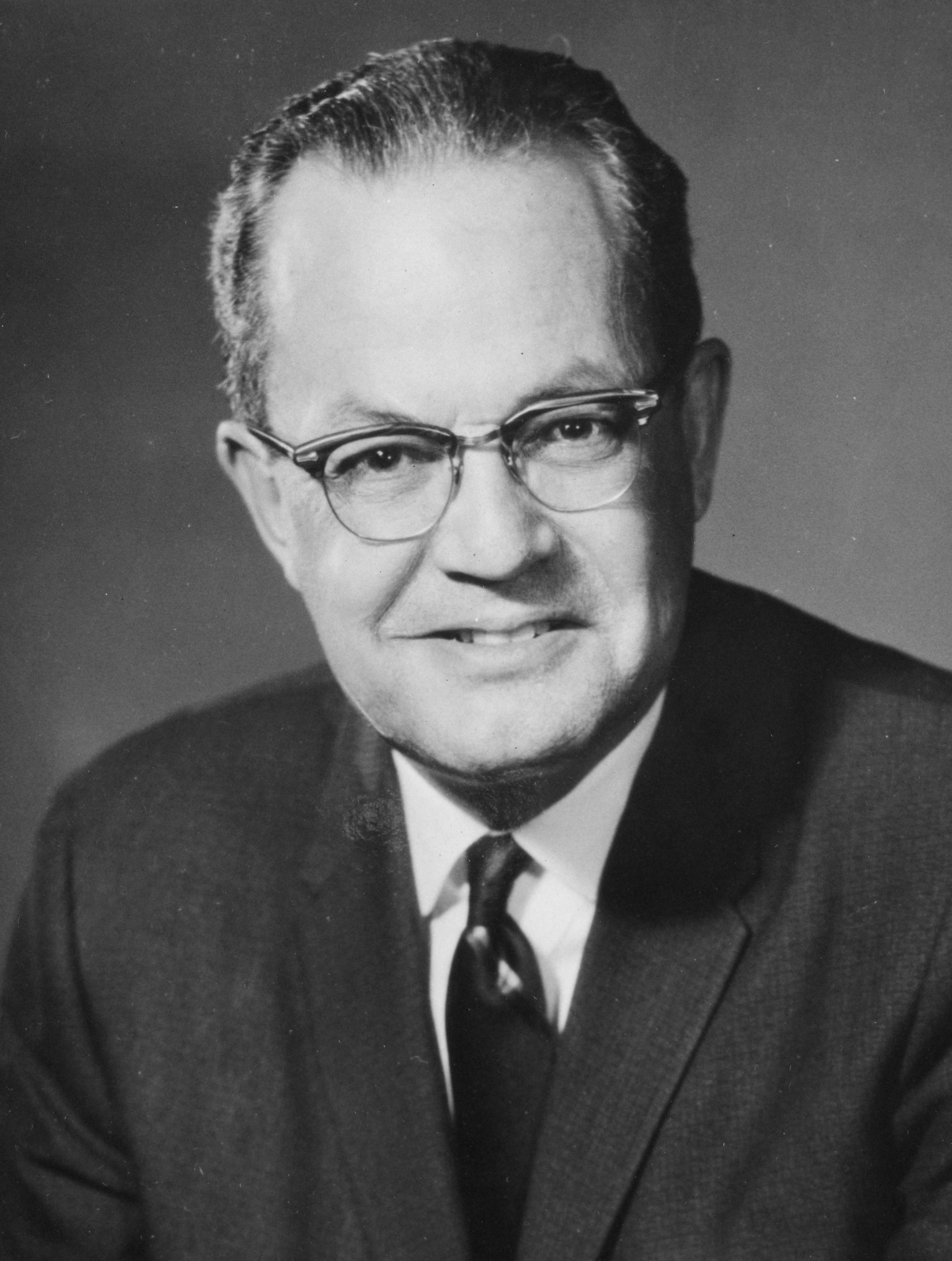

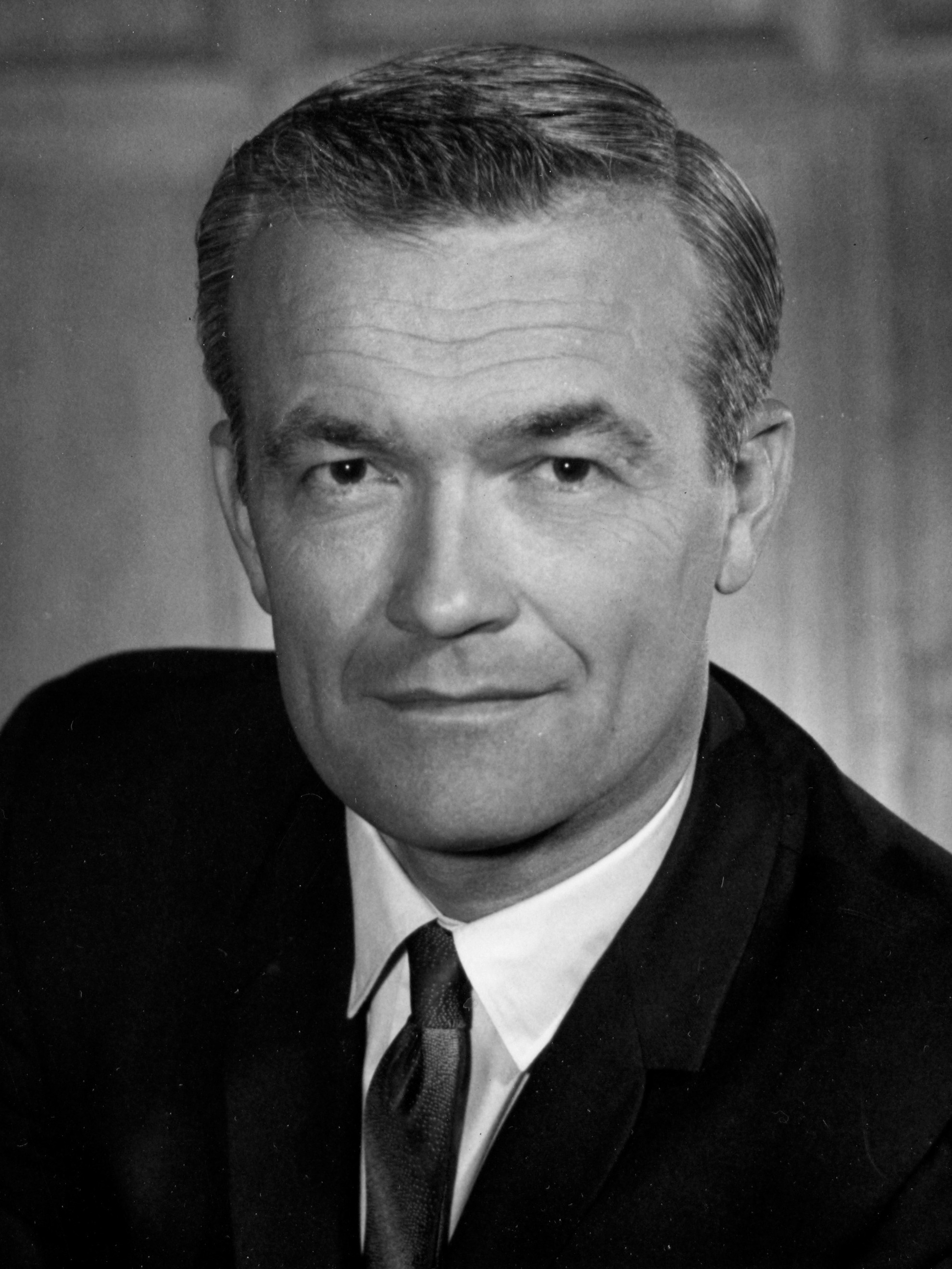
Nominee	Alan Bible	Edward Fike
Party	Democratic	Republican
Popular vote	83,622	69,083
Percentage	54.76%	45.24%
- County results Bible: 50–60% 60–70% Fike: 50–60%
U.S. senator before election
Alan Bible
Democratic
Elected U.S. Senator
Alan Bible
Democratic

The 1968 United States Senate election in Nevada was held on November 5, 1968. Incumbent Democratic U.S. Senator Alan Bible was re-elected to a third term in office over Republican Edward Fike despite Republican nominee Richard Nixon carrying the state in the concurrent presidential election in the state.

== General election ==
=== Candidates ===
- Alan Bible, incumbent U.S. Senator since 1954 (Democratic)
- Edward Fike, former Lieutenant Governor of Nevada (Republican)

=== Results ===
1968 U.S. Senate election in Nevada
Party	Candidate	Votes	%	±%
Democratic	Alan Bible (incumbent)	83,622	54.76%	
Republican	Edward Fike	69,083	45.24%	
Turnout		152,705	100.00%	
Democratic hold		Swing		

== See also ==
- 1968 United States Senate elections
