= 1964 United States Senate election in Nevada =

- November 3, 1964
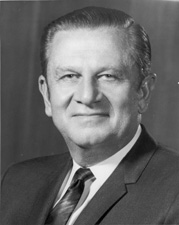

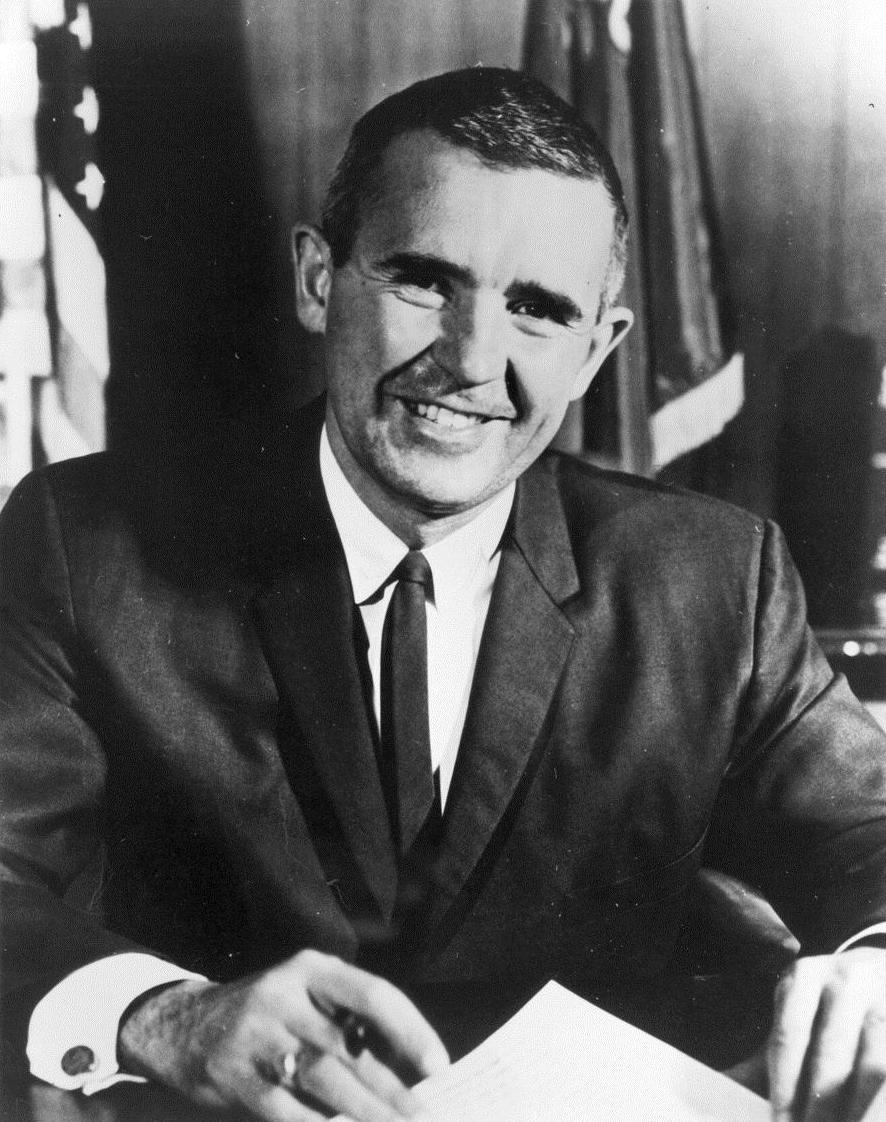
| Nominee | Howard Cannon | Paul Laxalt |
| Party | Democratic | Republican |
| Popular vote | 67,336 | 67,288 |
| Percentage | 50.02% | 49.98% |
- County results Cannon: 50–60% 60–70% Laxalt: 50–60% 60–70% 70–80%
U.S. senator before election
Howard Cannon
Democratic
Elected U.S. Senator
Howard Cannon
Democratic

The 1964 United States Senate election in Nevada was held on November 3, 1964. Incumbent Democratic U.S. Senator Howard Cannon won re-election to a second term by a slim margin of only 48 votes. Cannon defeated Paul Laxalt by a very narrow margin despite Lyndon Baines Johnson winning the state over Barry Goldwater in a landslide in the concurrent presidential election in Nevada.

To date, this remains the closest Senate race in US history since the passing of the 17th amendment in which the winner was seated as Senator. (Note: The 1974 election in New Hampshire, decided by only two votes, was certified but challenged before the Senate without a conclusion. New Hampshire held a second election which was decided by 27,771 votes.)

== General election ==
=== Candidates ===
- Howard Cannon, incumbent U.S. Senator since 1959 (Democrat)
- Paul Laxalt, Lieutenant Governor of Nevada and former Ormsby County District Attorney (Republican)

=== Results ===
General election results
| Party | Candidate | Votes | % | ±% |
|---|---|---|---|---|
| Democratic | Howard Cannon (incumbent) | 67,336 | 50.02 | −7.66 |
| Republican | Paul Laxalt | 67,288 | 49.98 | +7.66 |
| Majority | | 48 | 0.04 | −15.32 |
| Total votes | | 134,624 | 100.00 | |
| Democratic hold | | Swing | | |
