= 1980 United States Senate election in Nevada =

- November 4, 1980
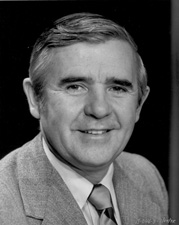

Nominee	Paul Laxalt	Mary Gojack
Party	Republican	Democratic
Popular vote	144,224	92,129
Percentage	58.52%	37.38%
- County results Laxalt: 50–60% 60–70% 70–80% 80–90%
U.S. senator before election
Paul Laxalt
Republican
Elected U.S. Senator
Paul Laxalt
Republican

The 1980 United States Senate election in Nevada was held on November 4, 1980. Incumbent Republican U.S. Senator Paul Laxalt won re-election to a second term. As of 2026, this is the last time that the Republicans have won the Class 3 Senate seat from Nevada. 42 years later Laxalt's grandson and former Nevada Attorney General Adam Laxalt would run to take this senate seat in 2022, but narrowly lost to incumbent Democrat Catherine Cortez Masto.

== Major candidates ==
=== Democratic ===
- Mary Gojack, former State Senator (1974–1978) and former State Assemblywoman (1972–1974)

=== Republican ===
- Paul Laxalt, incumbent U.S. Senator since 1974 and former Governor (1967–1971)

== Results ==
General election results
Party	Candidate	Votes	%	±%
Republican	Paul Laxalt (incumbent)	144,224	58.52%	+11.55%
Democratic	Mary Gojack	92,129	37.38%	−9.22%
Libertarian	Allen Hacker	6,920	2.81%	
None of These Candidates		3,163	1.28%	
Majority		52,095	21.14%	+20.77%
Turnout		246,436		
Republican hold		Swing		

== See also ==
- 1980 United States Senate elections
