= 1954 United States Senate special election in Nevada =

- November 2, 1954
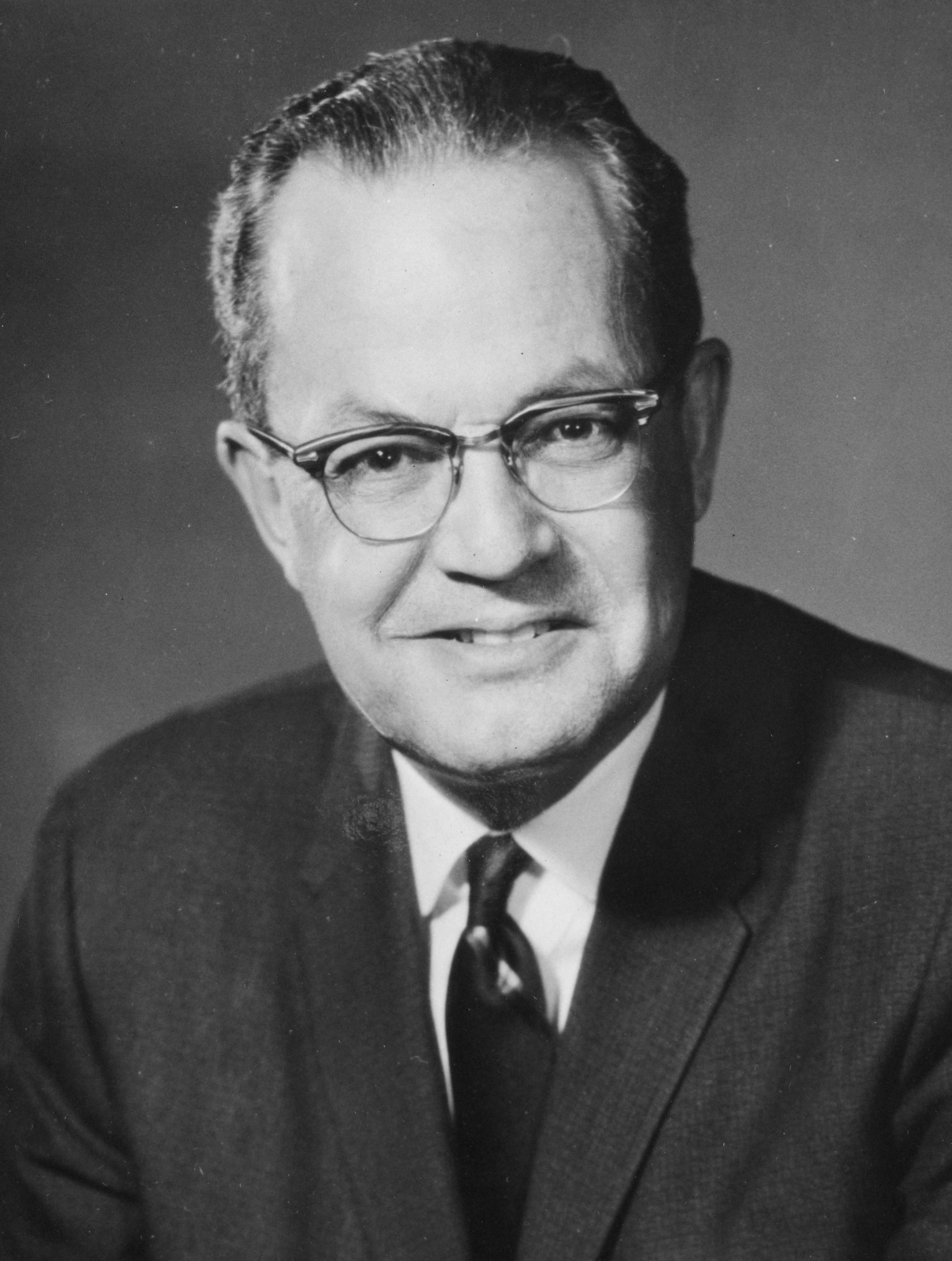

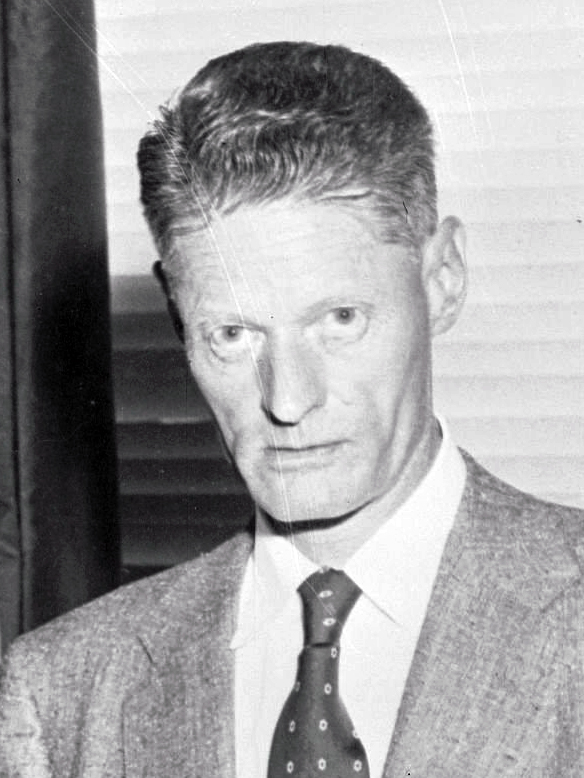
Nominee	Alan Bible	Ernest S. Brown
Party	Democratic	Republican
Popular vote	45,043	32,470
Percentage	58.11%	41.89%
- County results Bible: 50–60% 60–70% 70–80% Brown: 50–60%
U.S. senator before election
Ernest S. Brown
Republican
Elected U.S. Senator
Alan Bible
Democratic

The 1954 United States Senate special election in Nevada took place on November 2, 1954 to complete the unexpired term of late Senator Pat McCarran, who died in office on September 28, 1954. Senator Ernest S. Brown (who was appointed as McCarran's successor) ran to complete the term in office but was defeated by former Nevada Attorney General Alan Bible. Brown resigned his seat early to allow Bible to gain seniority, and Bible assumed the seat on December 1, 1954.

== General election ==
=== Candidates ===
- Alan Bible, Nevada Attorney General from 1943 to 1951 (Democratic)
- Ernest S. Brown, interim U.S. senator since October 1, 1954 (Republican)

=== Results ===
1954 United States Senate special election in Nevada
Party	Candidate	Votes	%
Democratic	Alan Bible	45,043	58.11
Republican	Ernest S. Brown (Incumbent)	32,470	41.89
Majority		12,573	16.22
Turnout		77,513	
Democratic gain from Republican			
