= Paul Laxalt =

American politician (1922–2018)

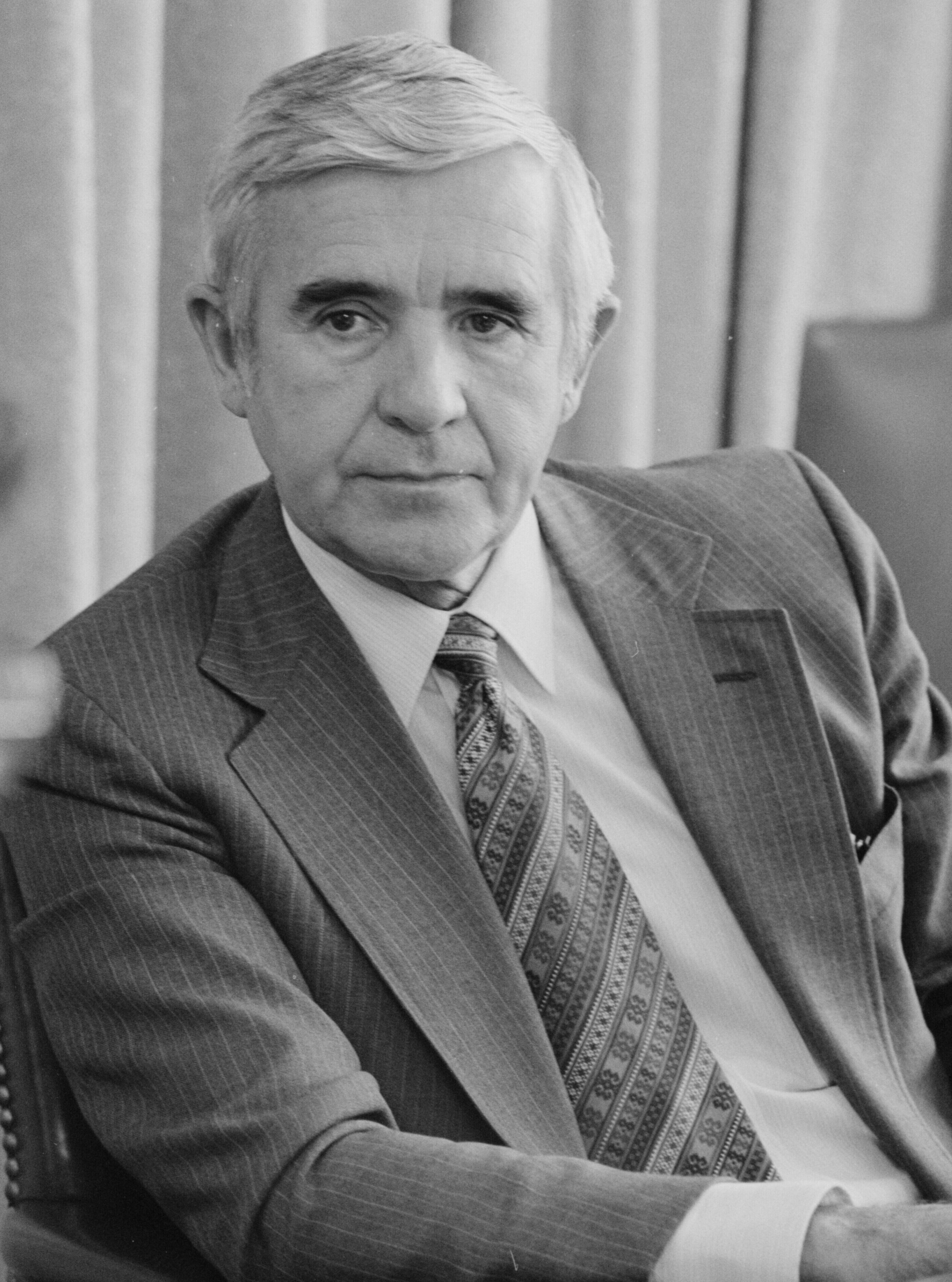
- Laxalt in 1982

General Chair of the Republican National Committee
- In office January 28, 1983 – January 23, 1987 Serving with Frank Fahrenkopf (National Chair)
- Preceded by: Richard Richards (Chair)
- Succeeded by: Lee Atwater (Chair)

United States Senator from Nevada
- In office December 18, 1974 – January 3, 1987
- Preceded by: Alan Bible
- Succeeded by: Harry Reid

22nd Governor of Nevada
- In office January 2, 1967 – January 4, 1971
- Lieutenant: Edward Fike
- Preceded by: Grant Sawyer
- Succeeded by: Mike O'Callaghan

23rd Lieutenant Governor of Nevada
- In office January 1, 1963 – January 2, 1967
- Governor: Grant Sawyer
- Preceded by: Maude Frazier
- Succeeded by: Edward Fike

District Attorney of Ormsby County
- In office 1951–1955
- Preceded by: Richard Waters
- Succeeded by: Cameron McVicar Batjer

Personal details
- Born: Paul Dominique Laxalt; August 2, 1922 Reno, Nevada, U.S.
- Died: August 6, 2018 (aged 96) McLean, Virginia, U.S.
- Resting place: Arlington National Cemetery
- Party: Republican
- Spouses: Jackalyn Ross (m. 1946; div. 1972) Carol Laxalt (m. 1975)
- Children: 6
- Relatives: Robert Laxalt (brother); Adam Laxalt (grandson)
- Education: Santa Clara University (BA); University of Denver (LLB)

Military service
- Branch/service: United States Army
- Years of service: 1943–1946
- Battles/wars: World War II • Battle of Leyte

Paul Dominique Laxalt (/ˈlæksɔːlt/ LAK-sawlt; August 2, 1922 – August 6, 2018) was an American attorney and politician who served as the 22nd governor of Nevada from 1967 to 1971 and as a United States senator representing Nevada from 1974 until 1987. A member of the Republican Party, he was one of Ronald Reagan's closest friends in politics. After Reagan was elected president in 1980, many in the national press referred to Laxalt as "the first friend". He was the older brother of writer Robert Laxalt and maternal grandfather of Adam Laxalt, who served as the 33rd attorney general of Nevada from 2015 to 2019.

== Early life, education, and early career ==
Laxalt was born on August 2, 1922, in Reno, Nevada. He was the son of Basque parents, Therese (née Alpetche) and Dominique Laxalt, who emigrated to the United States in the early 1900s from their homeland in the French Pyrenees. A shepherd, Dominique became wealthy in the sheep industry. After losing everything in the early 1920s, he returned to shepherding for the rest of his career. Therese, who had been trained at Paris's Le Cordon Bleu cooking school, eventually opened a restaurant called The French Hotel in Carson City, Nevada.

Therese and Dominique had six children: Paul, Robert (born in 1923), Suzanne (1925), John (1926), Marie (1928) and Peter (1931). Robert became an author; Suzanne, a Roman Catholic nun; John, a lawyer and political consultant; Marie, a school teacher; and Peter (Mick), an attorney. The Laxalt children were raised largely by their mother, as Dominique spent long periods of time away from the household tending his sheep in the deserts and mountains of Nevada. The children all helped Therese at The French Hotel.

Paul played on the 1938 state basketball champion team at Carson High School before graduating and attending Santa Clara University. When World War II broke out, Paul joined the U.S. Army and served as a medic, seeing action in the Battle of Leyte in the Philippines. After the war, he graduated from the Sturm College of Law.

== Early career ==
After graduating from law school and after serving as a district attorney, Laxalt enjoyed a successful career as a lawyer. His clients included George Whittell, who owned a large portion of the Lake Tahoe frontage on the Nevada side of the lake, Harvey and Llewellyn Gross, who built and ran Harvey's Wagon Wheel on Lake Tahoe's south shore, and Dick Graves, founder of the Sparks Nugget. While representing Graves, Laxalt helped win the famous "Golden Rooster case" in which the federal government tried to confiscate a 15-pound solid gold rooster that Graves displayed near the entrance of his Golden Rooster restaurant.

== Political career ==
Paul Laxalt's first attempt for public office was in 1950 when he ran for District Attorney of Ormsby County, Nevada, turning out the incumbent D.A. He served from 1950 to 1954. Laxalt's first run for statewide office came in 1962 when he ran for Lieutenant Governor against former Rep. Berkeley L. Bunker. Using innovative television ads and personal television appearances, Laxalt was able to introduce himself to the electorate, particularly in Southern Nevada where he was virtually unknown. In the middle of the campaign, at a Fourth of July rally in Las Vegas, Republican gubernatorial candidate and then-Lt. Gov. Rex Bell, a former Hollywood actor who had persuaded Laxalt to run with him on the GOP "ticket", died of a heart attack. A great amount of pressure was applied to Laxalt to run in Bell's place, but the young attorney demurred, and he remained in the lieutenant governor's race. He ended up defeating Bunker by a comfortable margin. Laxalt served one term as lieutenant governor from 1963 to 1967.

=== 1964 U.S. Senate campaign ===
In 1964, while serving as lieutenant governor, Laxalt ran for the United States Senate against freshman Democratic incumbent Sen. Howard Cannon. Laxalt had wanted to remain lieutenant governor. However, he declared his candidacy in mid-1964 after no other serious Republican contenders expressed interest. He did not have to give up his lieutenant governor's post for this race, since he was not up for reelection until 1966.

Republican candidates, running concurrently with the 1964 federal election, were undermined by the unpopularity of Sen. Barry Goldwater from Arizona, the Republican nominee for President against incumbent Lyndon B. Johnson, and the leader of their political ticket. Not long before election day, Goldwater scheduled a visit to Las Vegas. Laxalt's advisors told him he should "duck" Goldwater, as they feared any association with Goldwater would spell trouble. Laxalt, who often described Goldwater as his "political Godfather", reportedly told his aides, "Listen, Barry Goldwater is my friend. If I snubbed him now, I could never look him in the face again. I would rather lose." The Laxalt-Goldwater meeting on the tarmac was splashed on the front pages of local newspapers. (Goldwater lost Nevada by 28,000 votes.) Still, the Laxalt-Cannon race remained far closer than expected. As he watched the returns come in from his home in Carson City, Laxalt was stunned when one of the television networks actually declared him the winner. The next morning he flew to Las Vegas where he was told that certain precincts reported late and that Cannon had won by 48 votes, among the narrowest margins in a popular election for the U.S. Senate. The race was the subject of intense controversy for years.

=== 1966 Gubernatorial campaign ===
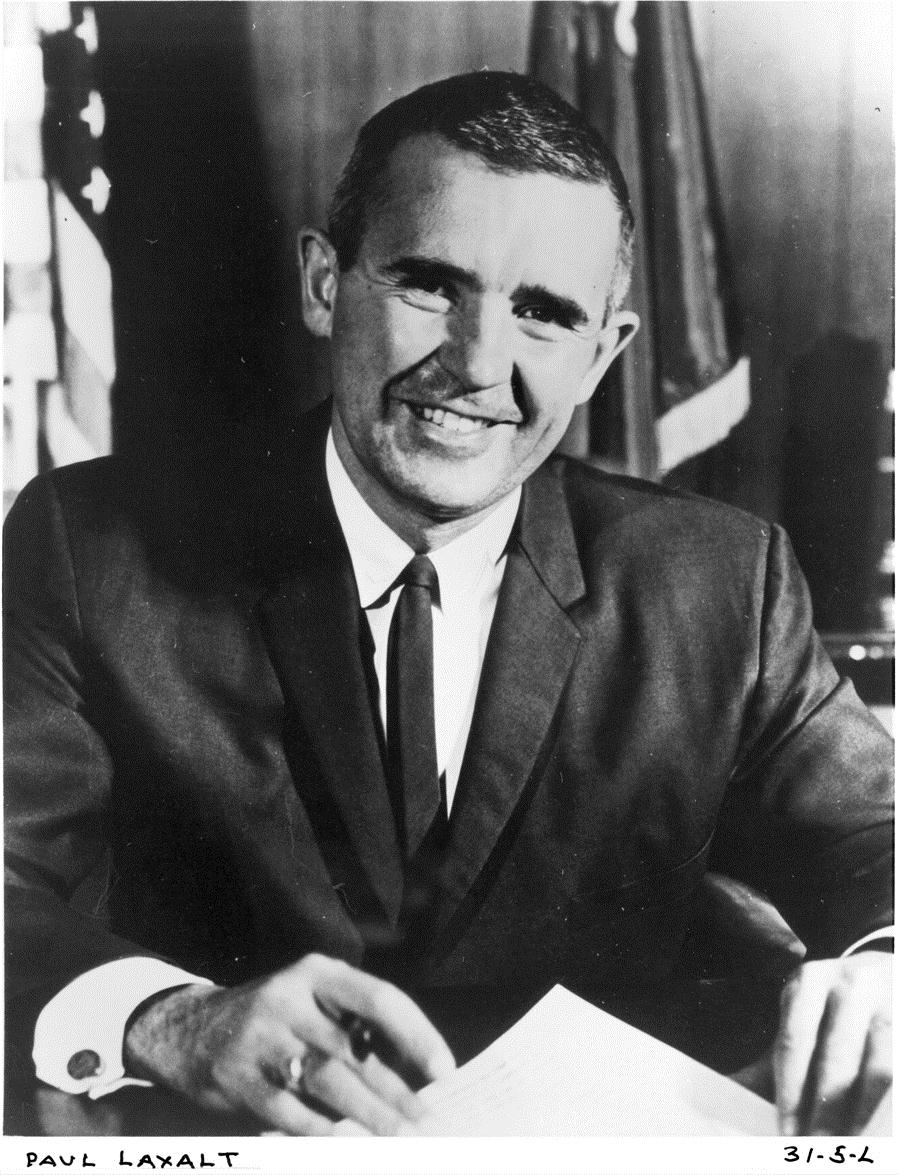
Governor Laxalt

Laxalt then decided to challenge two-term Governor Grant Sawyer. Although the election would not take place until November of 1966, Laxalt launched his campaign in the middle of 1965. One of the most hotly debated issues during the campaign was the federal government's involvement in Nevada gaming operations. The Federal Bureau of Investigation (FBI) and Justice Department had deep suspicions about organized crime's involvement in the gambling industry. Sawyer took the position that the federal government should stay out of Nevada's affairs. Laxalt took the position that Nevada had to cooperate with "the Feds" in order to be in a position to regulate gambling credibly. (In fact, one of Laxalt's first moves after his election was to meet with FBI Director J. Edgar Hoover to express Nevada's desire to establish a cooperative relationship.) During the gubernatorial campaign, Laxalt also led a movement to purge members of the John Birch Society from the state Republican Party. Laxalt defeated Sawyer by 5,937 votes. and served one term as governor, from January 1967 to January 1971.

=== Governor of Nevada ===
Laxalt's tenure as governor was noteworthy for coinciding with the purchase of several hotel-casinos by reclusive billionaire Howard Hughes. Laxalt allowed Hughes to secure his gaming license without appearing before the state's gaming regulatory authorities because he thought having an internationally acclaimed businessman involved in Nevada gaming would send a positive signal about the legitimacy of the industry. Laxalt also supported corporate ownership of gaming operations in Nevada, which helped pave the way for modern-day gambling. With the financial support of Hughes, Laxalt helped establish the state's first community colleges and Nevada's first medical school.

Along with Gov. Ronald Reagan of neighboring California, Laxalt helped create the Tahoe Regional Planning Agency, to protect scenic Lake Tahoe. He also expanded the park system and promoted prison reform in Nevada. On one occasion, Laxalt, against the advice of his staff, went to the Nevada State Penitentiary during a prisoner uprising. He met personally with several prisoners who described to the governor the deplorable conditions under which they were living. Laxalt sympathized with their concerns and ordered the prison staff to address the problems. When he was later asked by the media if he had qualms about entering the prison yard, Laxalt, a former trial lawyer, said, "No, not really. Many of them were my former clients!"

In 1970, Laxalt lobbied President Richard Nixon to reduce the prison sentence of notorious Teamster leader Jimmy Hoffa after Hoffa was convicted of attempting to bribe Sen. Howard Cannon, whom Laxalt had unsuccessfully challenged in 1964. While governor, Laxalt worked with Teamster officials on gambling investments in Nevada.

Laxalt governed Nevada as a fiscal conservative, but felt compelled to raise taxes at the outset of his administration because of the budget situation. Laxalt did not seek a second term. He bequeathed a budget surplus to his successor, Gov. Mike O'Callaghan. He left office saying that he had "a gut-full" of politics.

=== United States Senator ===
==== Elections ====
After leaving the governor's mansion, Laxalt and his family opened a hotel/casino in Carson City. In 1974, when twenty-year Democratic incumbent Sen. Alan Bible announced his retirement, Republican political insiders pressed Laxalt to re-enter politics and seek the open U.S. Senate seat. He eventually agreed and wound up running against the Democratic nominee, then-Lt. Gov. Harry Reid. At that time the Watergate scandal was a burden for all Republicans running for national office in 1974. Nonetheless, early in the campaign, Laxalt enjoyed a consistent but tight lead over Reid in most polls. However, after President Gerald Ford pardoned former President Richard Nixon, Laxalt's prospects, like Republican prospects everywhere, suddenly took a dramatic turn for the worse. Laxalt compared it to having "a hundred pound weight around my neck." Still, he managed a victory by 624 votes. To give Laxalt a leg-up in seniority, Sen. Bible resigned three weeks early on December 18, 1974. Gov. Mike O'Callaghan (Laxalt's successor as governor) appointed Laxalt to finish out Bible's term.

In 1980, Laxalt won re-election over former state Sen. Mary Gojack by 52,095 votes.

==== Tenure ====
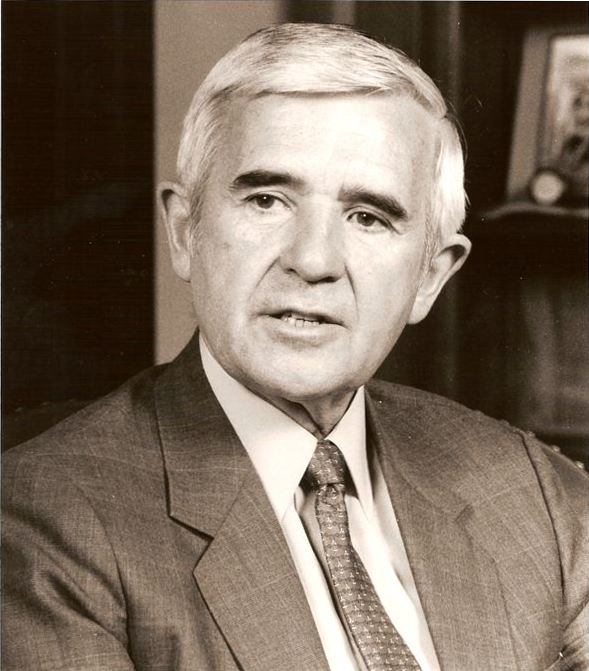
Senate picture

In his first term in the United States Senate, Laxalt was active in many legislative battles. In 1977, he led the fight against President Jimmy Carter's proposal to transfer the Panama Canal to the Panamanian government. Despite being in the minority in the Senate, Laxalt helped build a coalition opposed to the Panama Canal Treaties. Opponents successfully built a grassroots campaign designed to put pressure on the Senate. On the day of the vote, Laxalt was confident that he would be able to secure the 34 votes needed to defeat the treaties. However, his colleague, Sen. Howard Cannon (also from Nevada), decided to support the treaties. Even in defeat, Laxalt had won plaudits from both sides of the aisle for the manner in which he led the opposition. Indeed, throughout his Senate tenure, Laxalt remained popular among his colleagues, principally because he was viewed as a "straight shooter" and someone who never allowed political differences to turn personal. He was good friends with conservative Sen. Jesse Helms from North Carolina and liberal Sen. Ted Kennedy from Massachusetts. (At the request of Sen. Kennedy, Laxalt arranged to have President Ronald Reagan present Ethel Kennedy with the original copy of the medal honoring her late husband Robert F. Kennedy.)

During Laxalt's two terms in the U.S. Senate, he served on several influential committees, including the Labor and Public Welfare Committee, the Appropriations Committee, and the Judiciary Committee. When Republicans took control of the Senate in 1981, Laxalt became chairman of the Judiciary Committee's Regulatory Reform Subcommittee, and the Appropriations Committee's State, Justice and Commerce Subcommittee. In 1986, while serving on the Judiciary Committee, Laxalt played a key behind-the-scenes role in securing the committee's approval of President Reagan's nomination of then-Associate Justice William Rehnquist for Chief Justice of the Supreme Court. Negotiating principally with Sen. Ted Kennedy and Sen. Joe Biden from Delaware, Laxalt was able to strike a deal that allowed the committee to vote on the nomination. Rehnquist was subsequently approved by the full Senate by a margin of 65–33.

=== Relationship with Ronald Reagan ===
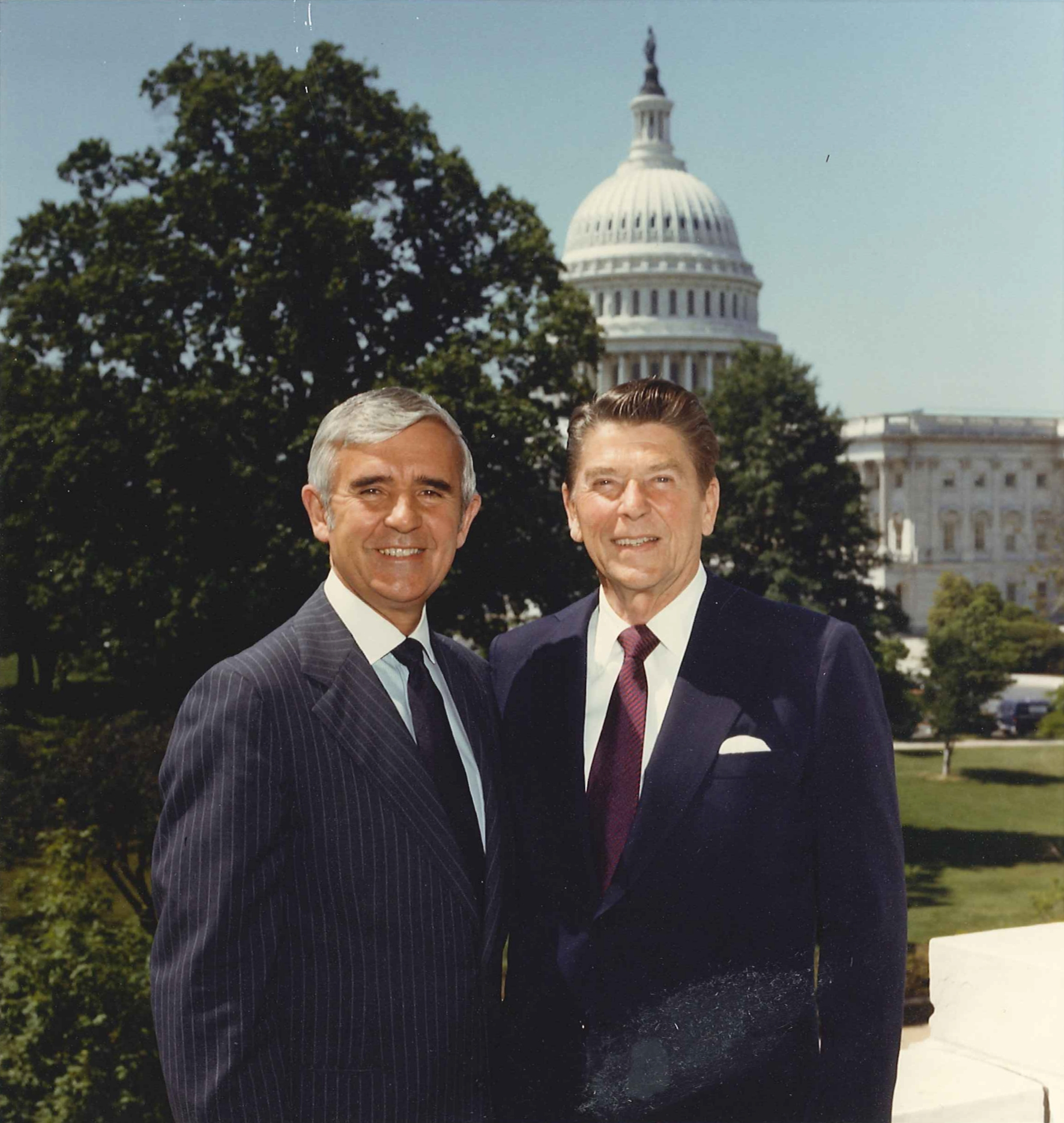
Senator Laxalt and then-candidate Reagan during the 1980 campaign

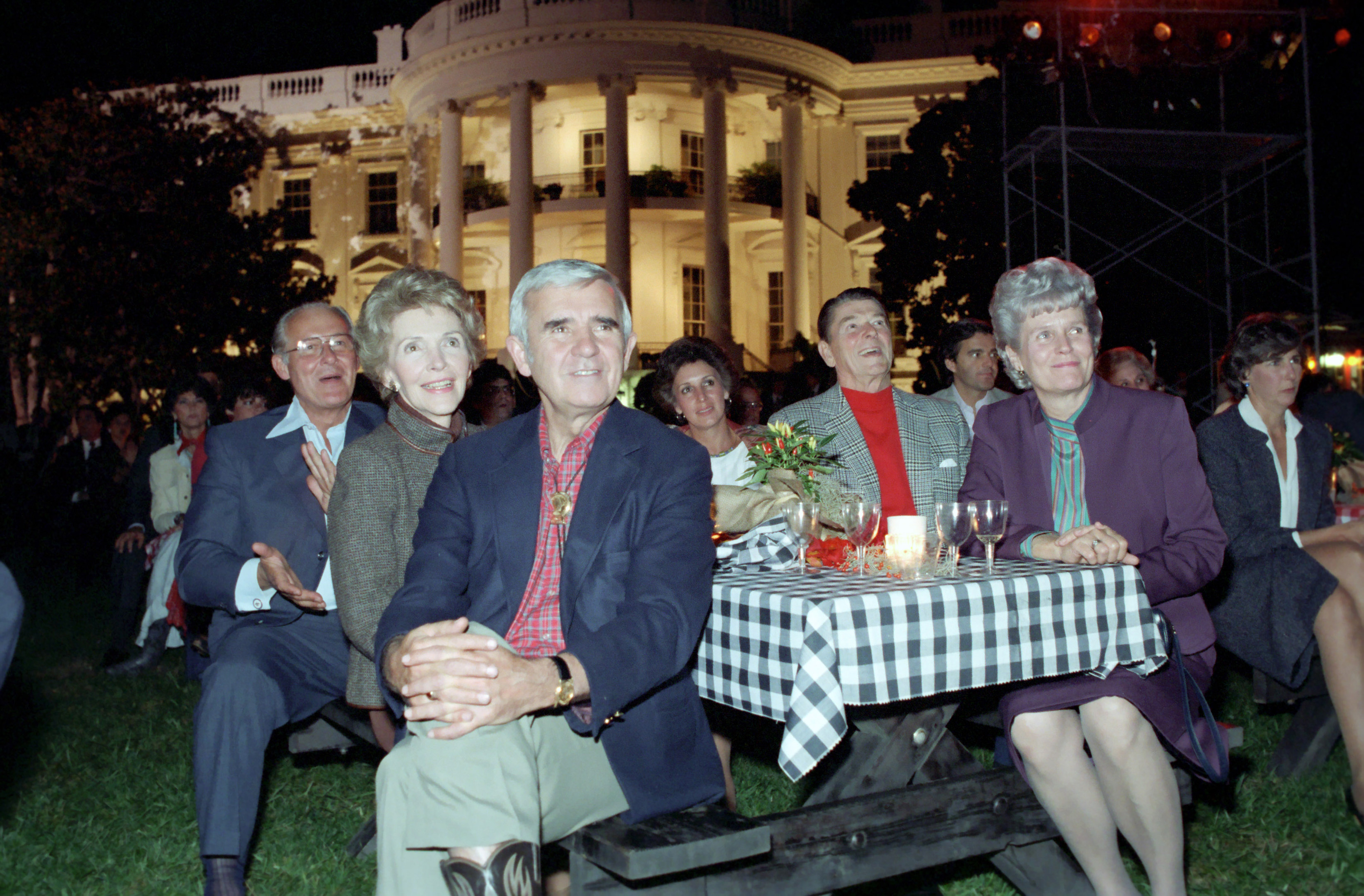
Laxalt, his wife, Carol, President Ronald Reagan, First Lady Nancy Reagan, Bob Michel and his wife, Corrine, watch the Oak Ridge Boys performance during the Barbecue for Members of Congress on the South Lawn in 1983

Laxalt had become close friends with Ronald Reagan during his time as governor, when Reagan was also in his first term as governor of neighboring California. They worked on many issues of mutual interest to both states, particularly those dealing with the preservation of Lake Tahoe. During Reagan's presidency, Laxalt was sometimes referred to as "The First Friend". Laxalt was national chairman of three Reagan presidential campaigns and placed Reagan's name in nomination at the Republican National Conventions of 1976, 1980, and 1984. During the 1980 Republican National Convention, Laxalt's name was floated as a potential vice presidential nominee for the Reagan ticket, but George H. W. Bush was chosen instead. At the behest of President Reagan, Laxalt served in the then-unprecedented role of General Chairman of the Republican Party from 1983 to 1987.

In fact, during Laxalt's second Senate term, several Nevadans came to Washington, D.C., due in large measure to his relationship with Reagan, to serve in prominent governmental and campaign positions. His long-time aide, Barbara Vucanovich, had been elected to serve in the House in 1982, becoming the first female elected to a federal position from Nevada. A long-time friend and prominent Nevada trial attorney, Frank Fahrenkopf, was elected to serve as Chairman of the Republican National Committee where he helped oversee Reagan's re-election and the 1988 election of President George H. W. Bush. Bob Broadbent of Boulder City became Assistant Secretary for Water and Science in the Department of the Interior; Bob Horton of Reno became Director of the Bureau of Mines; Cameron Batjer of Reno, a former Nevada Supreme Court Justice, served on the U.S. Sentencing Commission; Reese Taylor of Las Vegas served as Chairman of the Interstate Commerce Commission; and Ed Allison of Reno, Sig Rogich of Las Vegas, and Ralph V. Whitworth of Winnemucca all served in key roles in Reagan's 1984 re-election campaign. Laxalt's former Press Secretary and Chief of Staff, Tom Loranger, joined Laxalt in his post-Senate government consulting practice and now runs the D.C. office of the Ferraro Group, a Nevada government-relations firm founded by former Laxalt aide Greg Ferraro. In early 1987, Laxalt was at the top of the short list to replace Donald Regan as White House Chief of Staff, but he declined because he intended to run for president in 1988. Instead, he recommended former U.S. Senate Majority Leader Majority Howard Baker, who took the job.

Pres. Reagan also relied on Laxalt to be his troubleshooter when it came to the precarious relationship with Philippine dictator Ferdinand Marcos. With Marcos' negative track record on human rights, kleptocratic governance, and erosion of democratic ideals and principles in the Southeast Asian country, and Marcos' penchant off-the-cuff remark that he and Reagan have a special relationship, it had become an embarrassment to the White House. Laxalt visited Manila in October 1985 to relay to Marcos that he should start work on some reforms to deal with the sinking Philippine economy as well as the Armed Forces of the Philippines - particularly the overstaying and overaged generals loyal to Marcos, beginning with Chief-of-Staff Gen. Fabian Ver. Despite Laxalt regaling Marcos of his World War II track record and experience during the liberation of the Philippines, the Philippine President rejected the call on retiring Gen. Ver. On the last night of the People Power Revolution, which saw the Marcoses ousted from power, Marcos phoned Laxalt to get a feel on how Reagan views the situation in Manila. Uncannily, Laxalt was in the middle of a top-secret briefing in Washington to discuss about the coup that was happening in the Philippines. Laxalt informed the Philippine President "cut and cut cleanly. The time has come." Marcos responded that he was disappointed.

It was the 1976 Republican presidential race that may have cemented the tight political friendship between Laxalt and former-Gov. Reagan. In 1976, Reagan had decided to run for president, challenging President Gerald Ford for the Republican nomination. Ford enjoyed widespread support among the Republican establishment, particularly in Washington, D.C. Reagan decided that having Laxalt serve as his national chairman would give his campaign credibility it was otherwise lacking. Although Laxalt was not well known on a national level, he was well liked and respected in the U.S. Congress, and he was similarly respected by many prominent members of the national media. Laxalt eventually acceded to Reagan's request, even though doing so severely jeopardized his relationship with the Ford White House. Laxalt campaigned all over the United States on behalf of Reagan, often campaigning by his side.

With his back to the wall, Reagan won shocking victories in North Carolina and Texas, which propelled the race all the way to the national convention in Kansas City. Laxalt nominated Reagan at the convention. Eventually, the Reagan campaign lost a key procedural vote to Ford and the sitting president eked out a victory. Although he was on the losing side, Laxalt's national profile increased dramatically as a result of his efforts on behalf of Reagan. When Reagan defeated Democratic incumbent President Jimmy Carter in 1980, with Laxalt again serving as national chairman of Reagan's campaign, Laxalt's profile rose even higher.

==== Sacramento Bee libel suit ====
As a long-time public official in Nevada, where individuals with alleged ties to organized crime were prominent in the early Las Vegas gaming industry, Laxalt came under scrutiny for his relationships with certain individuals. In 1983, during Laxalt's second Senate term and on the eve of Reagan's re-election bid, the Sacramento Bee published two articles about Laxalt's business dealings while his family owned the Ormsby House, a hotel-casino in Carson City, in the early 1970s. The articles claimed that certain Federal agents had alleged that the casino had been skimmed of profits while owned by the Laxalt family. Laxalt sued the Bee for libel, claiming that the articles' allegations were false, and that the implication that Laxalt associated with members of organized crime was defamatory. He also denied knowing about skimming activities and, in fact, denied that any skimming whatsoever had taken place.

Laxalt sought $250 million in damages. In 1987, the lawsuit was settled. In a statement, the Bee acknowledged that pretrial discovery "had not shown that there was a skim" at the Ormsby House. Laxalt declared that pretrial investigations had found no evidence of the wrongdoing at issue. The Bee maintained that it did not commit libel because it had not stated that Laxalt was involved in wrongdoing; it had merely reported that a third party held suspicions that wrongdoing had taken place at the Ormsby House. Under the settlement, the two sides agreed to allow the question of attorneys' fees to be decided by a panel of former federal judges.

In March 1988, after an extensive review, the judges awarded Laxalt $647,452.52 in fees and costs. One of the panelists, former U.S. Attorney General Griffin Bell, who had served under President Jimmy Carter, said that he would have preferred awarding $2 million, but he felt the final amount was "fair." The Washington Post described the judges' decision as a "slap" at the Bee newspapers. Laxalt was quoted as saying that the case had proven the Bee's allegations to be without basis.

=== 1988 presidential election ===
Laxalt retired from the Senate in 1987 and was replaced by the man he had defeated in 1974, Harry Reid, who would go on to become the Senate Majority Leader and the longest-serving U.S. Senator from Nevada. Laxalt made a brief run for the Republican presidential nomination for the 1988 election in 1987. The campaign lasted only four months after Laxalt determined that the effort had fallen short of its fundraising goals. Political commentators at the time concluded that he had waited too long to enter the race, which meant that not only did his competitors have a leg up in organization, but also many of the top political strategists and fundraisers had already signed on with other camps. He was eventually named a co-chairman of George H. W. Bush's successful presidential campaign. Eight years later, he served in a similar capacity in Bob Dole's failed presidential bid in the 1996 election.

== After politics ==
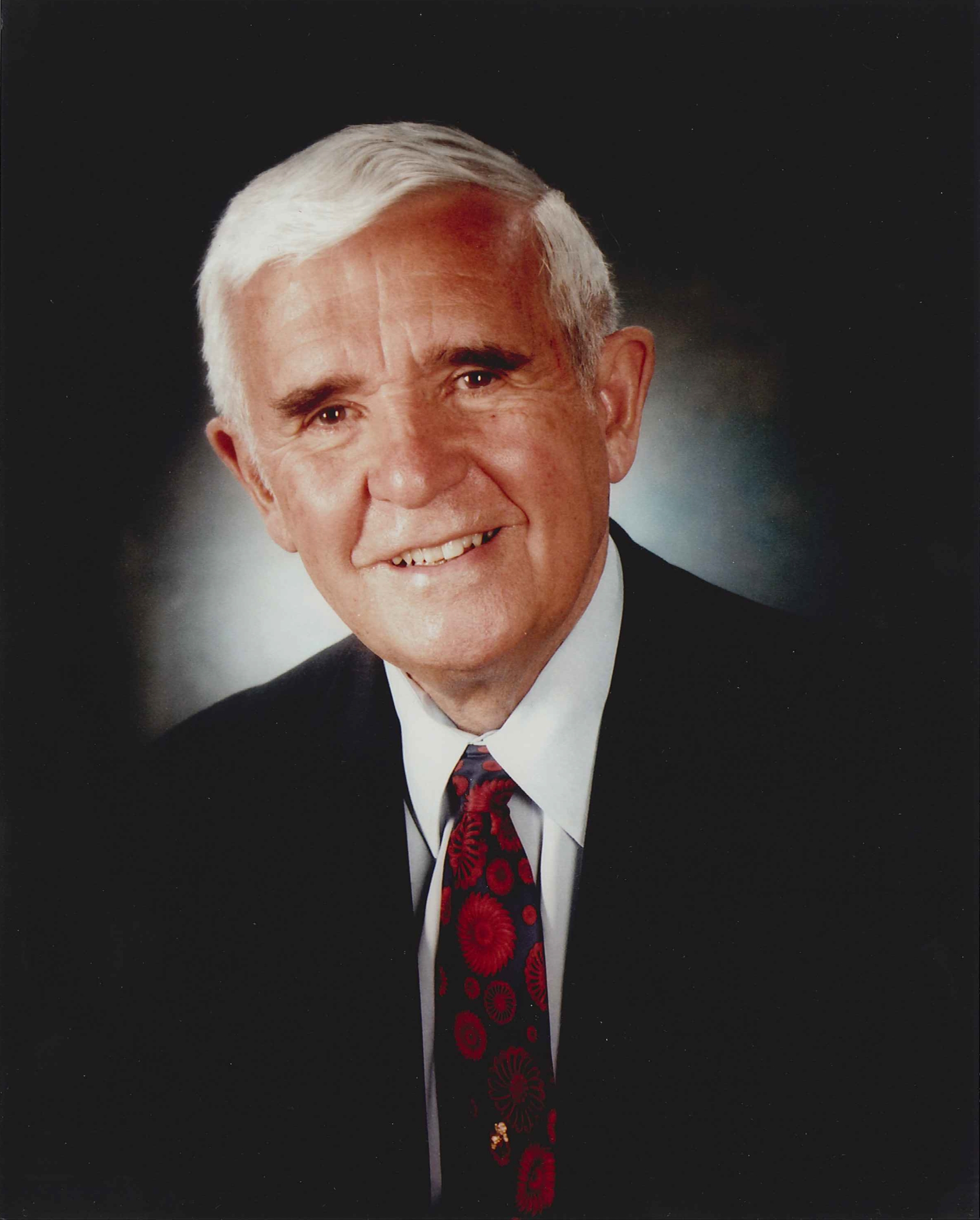
Laxalt in 2000

Laxalt was a partner in the New York City-based law firm of Finley, Kumble, Wagner, Underberg, Manley, Myerson & Casey and its successor law firm, Laxalt, Washington, Perito & Dubuc. He later formed a small government consulting firm known as The Paul Laxalt Group. After his retirement from the U.S. Senate, Laxalt was named by President George H. W. Bush to a prestigious deficit reduction panel that consisted of current and former members of Congress and other prominent Americans. The commission eventually deadlocked on how best to address federal budget deficits. Laxalt was honored in various ways both during and after his public service career. The Paul Laxalt Mineral Engineering Center, an $11 million building that was completed in 1983, has been described as a giant step forward for the University of Nevada-Reno and the School of Mines. The 60,000-square-foot building houses classrooms and laboratories for mining engineering, chemical and materials engineering, and geological sciences. The Paul Laxalt State Building in Carson City was formerly the U.S. Post Office (built in 1891) and the first Federal building erected in Nevada. It is located in the center of Carson City's Historic District.

One of Laxalt's initiatives that gave him great personal satisfaction was the "Intern" program he established during his two terms in the United States Senate. The program was designed to bring college-age students to Washington, D.C., to work in Laxalt's Senate office for the equivalent of a college semester. The program produced several individuals who went on to prominent careers in government and business, including Brian Sandoval, former governor of Nevada.

On August 2, 2012, Governor Sandoval issued a proclamation declaring that date, Laxalt's 90th birthday, as "Paul Laxalt Day" in the state of Nevada.

== Personal life ==
Laxalt was married in 1946 to Jackalyn Ross (1927–2004), the daughter of John Rolly Ross, who was a federal judge in Nevada. The couple had five daughters (Gail, Sheila, Michelle, Kevin, and Kathleen) and one son (John Paul). They divorced in 1972. Laxalt was married to his second wife, Carol, until his death. She had one daughter (Denise) from a previous marriage. After he retired from the Senate, Paul and Carol Laxalt continued to reside in northern Virginia. Laxalt had twelve grandchildren and four great-grandchildren.

In 1978, Laxalt's daughter Michelle had a son, Adam Laxalt, with Laxalt's then-Senate colleague, Pete Domenici of New Mexico. Michelle Laxalt raised Adam as a single parent. Adam Laxalt's paternity was not publicly acknowledged by his parents until 2013. At that time, Domenici acknowledged that Laxalt was his son and was born as a result of an extramarital affair. Laxalt's grandson Adam served as Attorney General of Nevada from 2015 to 2019. In the 2022 midterm elections, Adam narrowly lost his bid to unseat Catherine Cortez Masto, the incumbent United States Senator from Nevada.

=== Death ===
Laxalt died on August 6, 2018, at a health care facility in McLean, Virginia, four days after his 96th birthday.

Former Senate Majority Leader Harry Reid said in a statement after Laxalt's death: “We came from different political parties and backgrounds, but that didn't matter to Paul Laxalt. He was the epitome of a gentleman. He treated me, and everyone, with the utmost respect and friendship."

Nevada governor Brian Sandoval remarked that “Paul Laxalt was many things – a statesman, a gentleman and a class act – above all, he was a champion for his beloved Nevada and our country."

On September 6, 2018, a funeral service was held for Senator Laxalt at St. Matthew's Cathedral in Washington, D.C. Attendees included former Vice President Dick Cheney, former Senate Majority Leader Bob Dole, former Attorney General Edwin Meese III and scores of Nevadans who made the trek to the nation's capital to pay their last respects to Laxalt. Just before Thanksgiving, a memorial service took place at the Governor's Mansion in Nevada's capital and Laxalt's hometown, Carson City. Speakers included Governor Sandoval, Greg Ferraro, Frank Fahrenkopf, Ed Allison and Sig Rogich. Attendees included former Governors Bob List, Richard Bryan and Bob Miller. In addition, several former Laxalt staff members attended including Doug Fuller, Robbie Aiken, Hal Furman and Gene Drakulich. A few weeks later, with family and close friends present, and in honor of his service during World War II, Laxalt was interred at Arlington National Cemetery. A 21-gun salute concluded the ceremony.

Party political offices
Preceded by Rex Bell	Republican nominee for Lieutenant Governor of Nevada; 1962	Succeeded by Edward Fike
Preceded by George W. Malone	Republican nominee for U.S. Senator from Nevada (Class 1); 1964	Succeeded by William Raggio
Preceded by Oran K. Gragson	Republican nominee for Governor of Nevada; 1966	Succeeded by Edward Fike
Preceded by Edward Fike	Republican nominee for U.S. Senator from Nevada (Class 3); 1974, 1980	Succeeded by Jim Santini
Preceded by Richard Richards as Chair of the Republican National Committee	General Chair of the Republican National Committee; 1983–1987; Served alongside: Frank Fahrenkopf (National Chair)	Succeeded by Lee Atwater as Chair of the Republican National Committee
Political offices
Preceded by Maude Frazier	Lieutenant Governor of Nevada; 1963–1967	Succeeded by Edward Fike
Preceded by Grant Sawyer	Governor of Nevada; 1967–1971	Succeeded by Mike O'Callaghan
U.S. Senate
Preceded by Alan Bible	United States Senator (Class 3) from Nevada; 1974–1987; Served alongside: Howard Cannon, Chic Hecht	Succeeded by Harry Reid
