= United States Congressional Joint Committee on Washington Metropolitan Problems =

The U.S. Congress Joint Committee on Washington Metropolitan Problems was founded in 1957 to address Washington, D.C. Metropolitan Area urban issues, such as the transportation system and water supply.

Alan Bible served as chairman during the Eighty-fifth and Eighty-sixth Congresses. Frederick Gutheim served as Staff Director.

The Department of Interior Appropriations Act for fiscal year 1957 included funds for the National Capital Planning Commission and the National Capital Regional Planning Council to conduct a joint "survey of the present and future mass transportation needs of the National Capital region" (70 Stat. 271). As the survey proceeded, those involved became convinced that a more wide-ranging and comprehensive study was required. Accordingly, a joint congressional committee was established to study the problems created by growth in the greater District of Columbia region and to make recommendations regarding them. Members of the committee were drawn from the House and Senate Committees on the District of Columbia.

The Committee's work proceeded in two phases. During the first phase, until January 1959, the committee studied and prepared staff reports on the region's water supply, pollution, economic development, park areas, and governmental organization. Transportation problems were not a special focus of the committee during the first phase because the mass transportation survey was not yet completed. The second phase, beginning in November 1959, concentrated on transportation issues and resulted in the National Capital Transportation Act (Public Law 86-669).
