= Ernest S. Brown =

American politician (1903–1965)

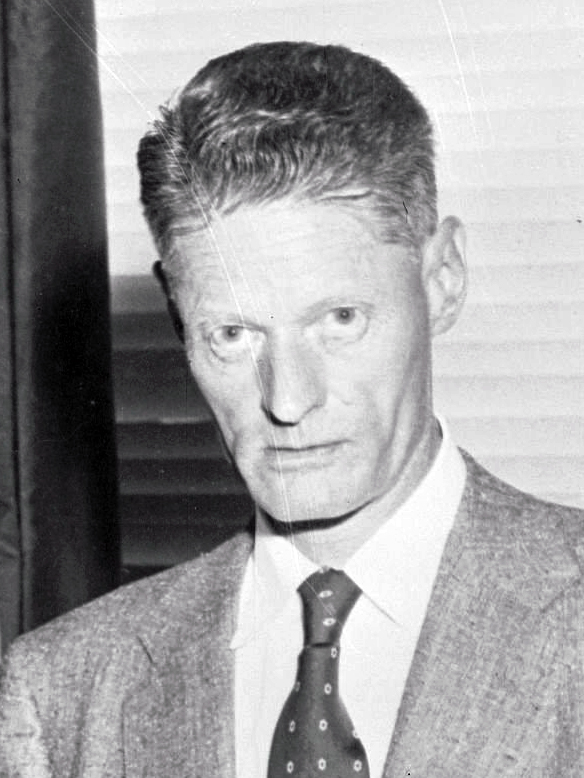
- Brown in 1954

United States Senator from Nevada
- In office October 1, 1954 – December 1, 1954
- Appointed by: Charles H. Russell
- Preceded by: Pat McCarran
- Succeeded by: Alan Bible

District Attorney of Washoe County, Nevada
- In office January 1935 – February 1942
- Preceded by: Melvin E. Jepson
- Succeeded by: Douglas Busey

Member of the Nevada State Assembly
- In office 1933–1935 Serving with Harry Dunseath, Fred D. Black, W. Holmes Goodwin, J. H. Cahill, C. P. Johnson
- Preceded by: Fred D. Black, Harry Dunseath, August Frohlich, Guy Walts, Fred Small, E. J. Kleppe
- Succeeded by: Curry Jameson, Fred Phillips, W. Holmes Goodwin, O. M. Renfro, Jack Horgan, James Clark
- Constituency: Reno district

Personal details
- Born: September 25, 1903 Alturas, California, U.S.
- Died: July 23, 1965 (aged 61) Reno, Nevada, U.S.
- Party: Republican
- Education: University of Nevada at Reno
- Profession: Attorney

Ernest Spargur Brown (September 25, 1903 – July 23, 1965) was Washoe County district attorney, a US Army colonel in World War II, and was appointed a United States senator from Nevada in 1954.

Born in Alturas, California, Brown moved with his family to Reno, Nevada, in 1906, where he later attended the public schools. He graduated from the University of Nevada at Reno in 1927 with the Bachelor of Arts degree he had completed in 1926. Brown studied law at night while still in college, gained admission to the bar in 1927, then commenced a legal practice in Reno. He served in the Nevada State Assembly in 1933. From 1935 to February 1942, Brown was the district attorney of Washoe County. A longtime member of the military reserves, he resigned from office in 1942 to enter active service in the United States Army as a major. He advanced through the ranks to colonel during the war, and he was discharged in 1945. Brown returned to his Reno home to resume the practice of law.

On October 1, 1954, Nevada Governor Charles H. Russell, appointed Brown to the U.S. Senate as a Republican to fill the vacancy caused by the death of veteran Senator Pat McCarran. Democrat Alan Bible defeated him in a special election to keep his Senate seat in November 1954. Brown resigned his seat early to allow Bible to gain seniority and assume the seat on December 1, 1954, and Brown once again resumed the practice of law in Reno, Nevada.

Brown died in Reno in 1965, and was interred in the Masonic section of Mountain View Cemetery.

Party political offices
Preceded by George E. Marshall	Republican nominee for U.S. Senator from Nevada (Class 3); 1954	Succeeded by Clarence Clifton Young
U.S. Senate
Preceded by Pat McCarran	U.S. senator (Class 3) from Nevada; 1954; Served alongside: George W. Malone	Succeeded by Alan Bible
