= 1962 United States Senate election in Nevada =

- November 6, 1962
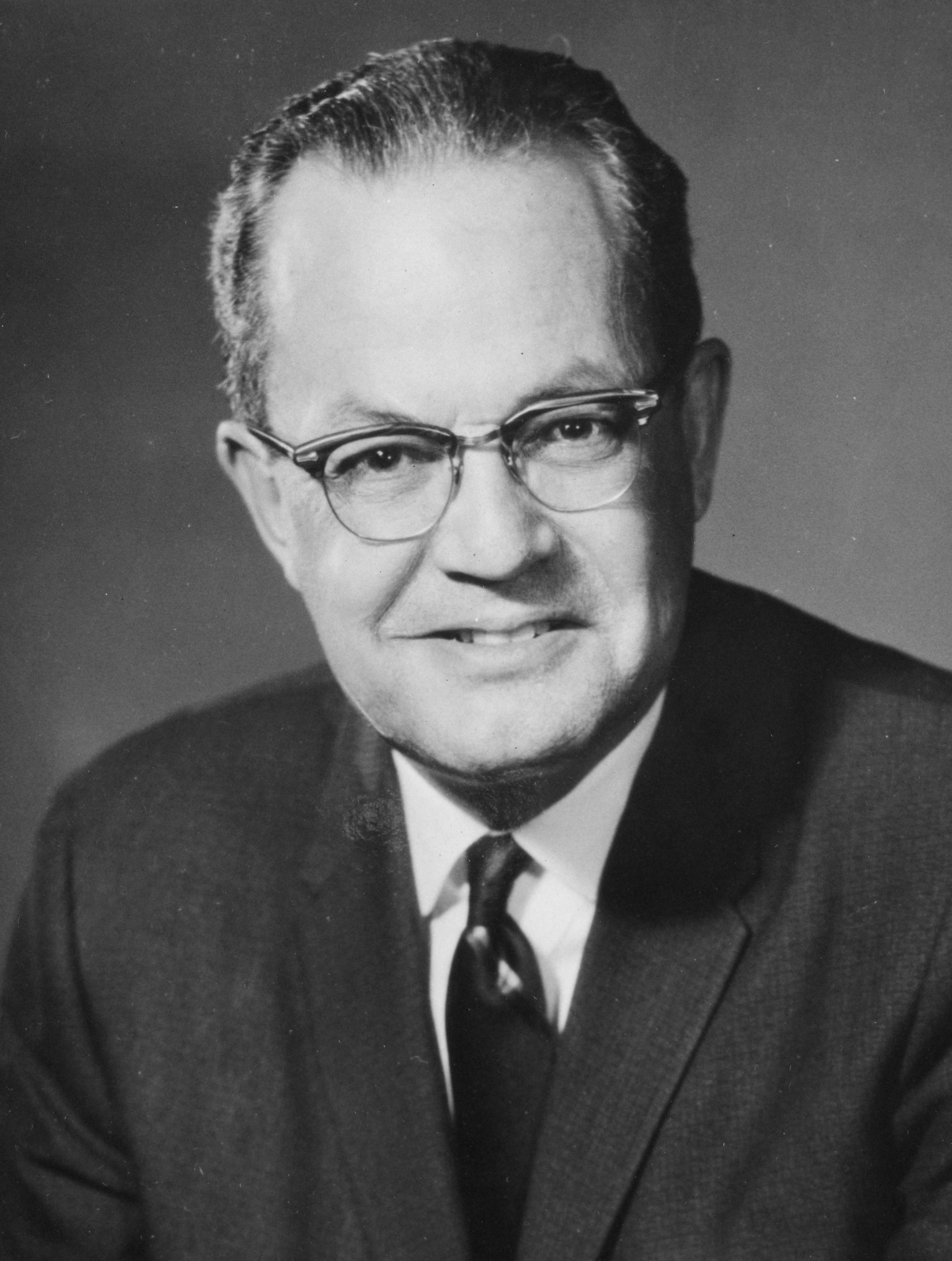

Nominee	Alan Bible	William B. Wright
Party	Democratic	Republican
Popular vote	63,443	33,749
Percentage	65.28%	34.72%
- County results Bible: 50–60% 60–70% 70–80% Wright: 50–60%
U.S. senator before election
Alan Bible
Democratic
Elected U.S. Senator
Alan Bible
Democratic

The 1962 United States Senate election in Nevada was held on November 6, 1962. Incumbent Democratic U.S. Senator Alan Bible was re-elected to a second term in office over Republican William B. Wright.

== General election ==
=== Candidates ===
- Alan Bible, incumbent U.S. Senator since 1954 (Democratic)
- William B. Wright (Republican)

=== Results ===
1962 U.S. Senate election in Nevada
Party	Candidate	Votes	%	±%
Democratic	Alan Bible (incumbent)	63,443	65.28%	
Republican	William B. Wright	33,749	34.72%	
Turnout		97,192	100.00%	
Democratic hold		Swing		

== See also ==
- 1962 United States Senate elections
