= Clarence Clifton Young =

American judge

C. Clifton Young
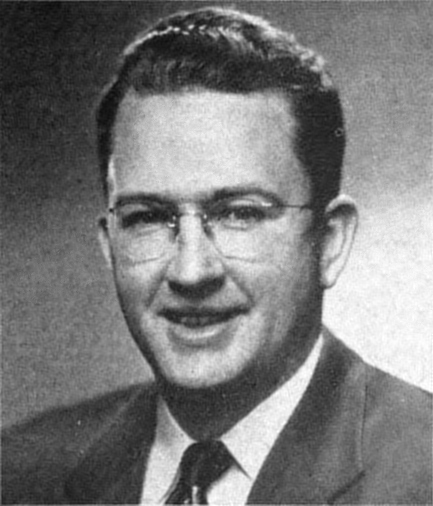

Member of the U.S. House of Representatives from Nevada's at-large district
- In office January 3, 1953 – January 3, 1957
- Preceded by: Walter S. Baring Jr.
- Succeeded by: Walter S. Baring Jr.

Member of the Nevada Senate
- In office 1966–1980

Justice of the Nevada Supreme Court (Seat D)
- In office 1985–2002
- Preceded by: Noel E. Manoukian
- Succeeded by: Mark Gibbons

Personal details
- Born: November 7, 1922 Lovelock, Nevada, U.S.
- Died: April 3, 2016 (aged 93) Reno, Nevada, U.S.
- Party: Republican
- Spouse: Jane
- Profession: Attorney

Clarence Clifton "Cliff" Young (November 7, 1922 – April 3, 2016), known as C. Clifton Young, was a United States congressman from Nevada.

Young was born in Lovelock in 1922 and earned a bachelor's from the University of Nevada. He earned his Juris Doctor from Harvard Law School.

A Republican, Young was elected to the U.S. House of Representatives from the state's at-large district in 1952 and re-elected in 1954. He won the Republican nomination for the United States Senate in 1956 but was defeated by incumbent Democrat Alan Bible in a close race.

Young later served in the Nevada Senate, from 1966 to 1980, and on the Nevada Supreme Court from 1985 to 2002, including a stint as chief justice (1989–1990). He also served as president of the National Wildlife Federation (1981–1983). Young died in Reno, Nevada in 2016 at the age of 93.

In 1988, the Federal Building and U.S. Courthouse in Reno, Nevada was renamed for Young.

== Notes ==
Party political offices
Preceded by Ernest S. Brown	Republican nominee for U.S. Senator from Nevada (Class 3); 1956	Succeeded by William B. Wright
U.S. House of Representatives
Preceded by Walter S. Baring Jr.	Member of the U.S. House of Representatives from Nevada's at-large congressional district 1953–1957	Succeeded by Walter S. Baring Jr.
