= 1956 United States Senate election in Nevada =

- November 6, 1956
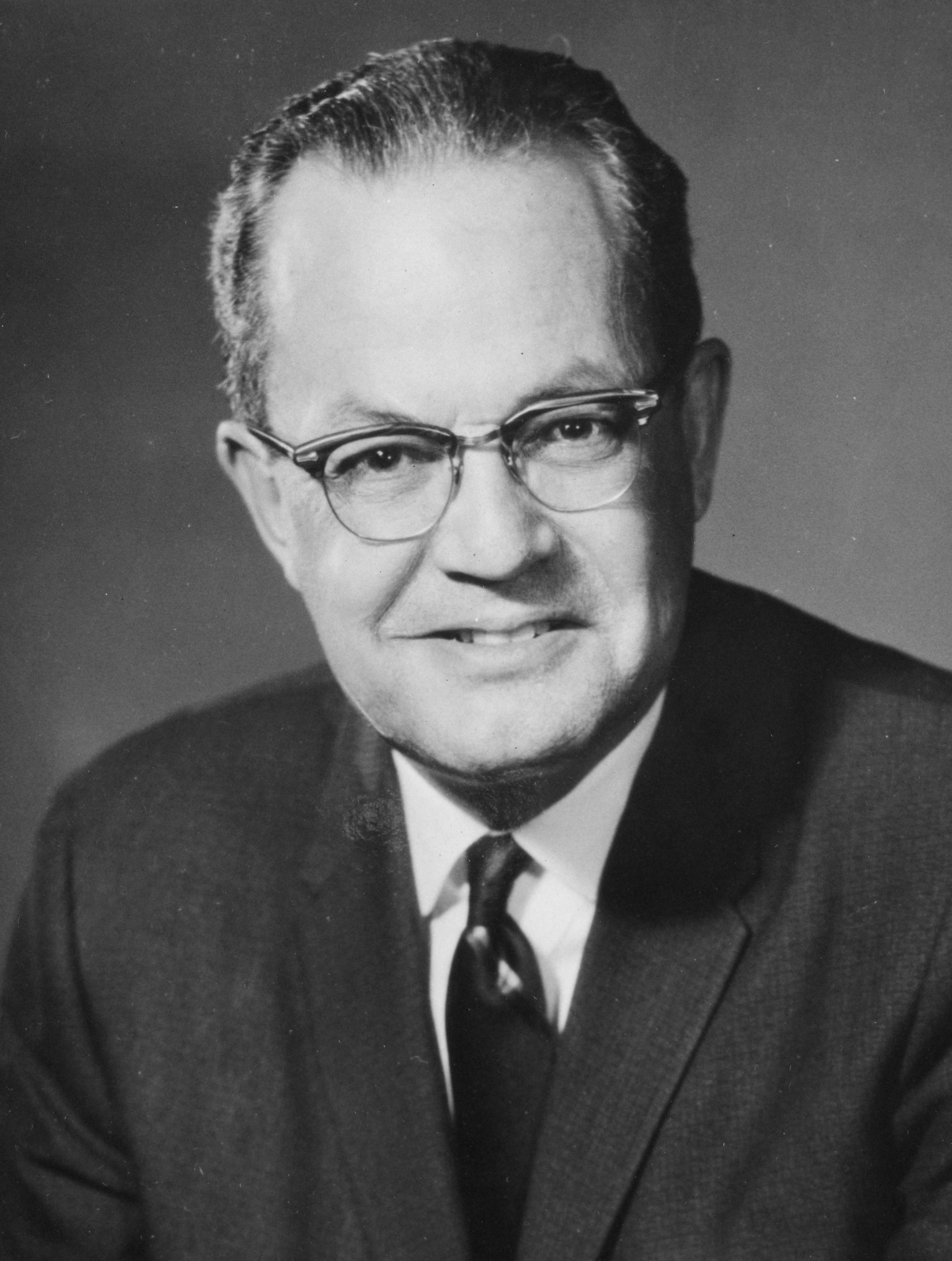

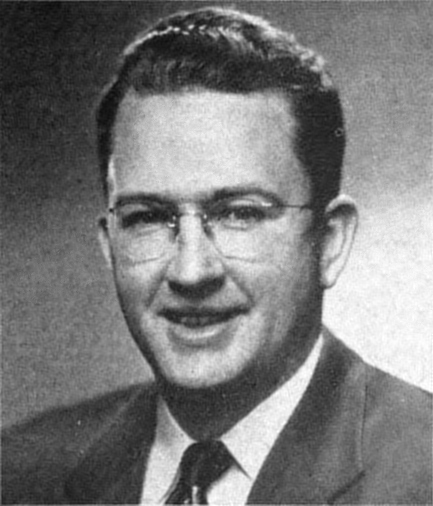
Nominee	Alan Bible	Cliff Young
Party	Democratic	Republican
Popular vote	50,677	45,712
Percentage	52.58%	47.42%
- County results Bible: 50–60% 60–70% Young: 50–60% 60–70%
U.S. senator before election
Alan Bible
Democratic
Elected U.S. Senator
Alan Bible
Democratic

The 1956 United States Senate election in Nevada was held on November 6, 1956. Incumbent Democratic U.S. Senator Alan Bible, who won a special election to complete the unexpired term of Pat McCarran, was re-elected to a full term in office over Republican U.S. Representative Cliff Young despite Republican nominee Dwight David Eisenhower winning the state in the concurrent presidential election in Nevada.

== General election ==
=== Candidates ===
- Alan Bible, incumbent U.S. Senator since 1954 (Democratic)
- Cliff Young, U.S. Representative at-large (Republican)

=== Results ===
1956 U.S. Senate election in Nevada
Party	Candidate	Votes	%	±%
Democratic	Alan Bible (incumbent)	50,677	52.58%	
Republican	Cliff Young	45,712	47.42%	
Turnout		96,389	100.00%	
Democratic hold		Swing		

== See also ==
- 1956 United States Senate elections
