= Robert Laxalt =

American novelist

- Born: September 25, 1923; Alturas, California, United States
- Died: March 23, 2001 (aged 77); Reno, Nevada, US
- Occupation: Writer
- Employer: University of Nevada, Reno
- Spouse: Joyce Nielsen Laxalt
- Children: 3 (Bruce, Monique, and Kristin)

Robert Laxalt (September 25, 1923 – March 23, 2001) was an American writer from Nevada.

== Biography ==
Robert Laxalt was born in 1923, a decade and a half after his father Dominique Laxalt and his mother Theresa Laxalt had emigrated to the United States in 1906 to herd sheep. His brother Paul Laxalt later became Governor of Nevada (1967–1971) and then a United States senator (1974–1986). After graduating from Carson City High School, Robert Laxalt attended Santa Clara University and then the University of Nevada at Reno.

Robert Laxalt began his writing career as a journalist working for United Press International, before starting his own news service in Nevada in the 1950s. In 1957, Laxalt published his second book Sweet Promised Land, which was widely read and remains his best-known work today. This book tells the story of Laxalt journeying with his father back to France. Laxalt later published over a dozen books, among which several (like Sweet Promised Land and The Basque Hotel) are biographical or semi-fictional accounts of his family's history.

In 1961, Robert Laxalt founded the University of Nevada Press and served as its first editor.

== Basque identity ==
From the Basque Oral History Project:

Laxalt brought Basque identity to the forefront of those living in the Western States. Born on a livestock ranch during the Great Depression, he saw his father went out on the road doing whatever he could to make a living because of the depression. His mother heard that there was a Basque hotel in Carson City for sale named the French Hotel. The business went pretty well and even during Prohibition the hotels served wine. The clientele were more American than Basque. The politicians took a liking to Paul at the time, said he'd be governor some day. Eventually his father bought some ewes again and started buying private land so he would be able to run his sheep. He never wanted to be big again, because it was too risky. In the hotel there were also many miners, prospectors and buckaroos. In town, the Basques would wear their best suits every day. His father almost went crazy staying in the hotel, wanted to be outside in the mountains running sheep and cattle.

They knew most of the other families in the area, would travel around all the time. His father had only one American sheepherder, but he lost sheep. The significance of the Basque hotels were that they were a home away from home for the sheepherders, where they could speak Basque, play cards and have good food. About the herders, what they did and how they felt about their lifestyle. Who were the best sheepherders according to someone, scots and irishmen but the Basques would always stay with the sheep and never leave them.

== Books by Robert Laxalt ==
- The Violent Land: Tales the Old Timers Tell. Reno: Nevada Publishing Co., 1953.
- Sweet Promised Land. New York: Harper & Row, 1957.
- A Man in the Wheatfield. New York: Harper & Row, 1964. Selected by the American Library Association as one of the six notable works of American fiction that year.
- Nevada. New York: Coward McCann, 1970. Children's book.
- In a Hundred Graves: A Basque Portrait. University of Nevada Press, 1972.
- Nevada: A Bicentennial History. New York: Norton, 1977.
- A Cup of Tea in Pamplona. University of Nevada Press, 1985. Nominated for a 1985 Pulitzer Prize in fiction.
- A Basque Hotel. University of Nevada Press, 1989. Nominated for a Pulitzer Prize.
- A Time We Knew: Images of Yesterday in the Basque Homeland. University of Nevada Press, 1990.
- The Child of the Holy Ghost. University of Nevada Press, 1992
- A Lean Year and Other Stories. University of Nevada Press, 1994. 16 Short Stories.
- The Governor's Mansion. University of Nevada Press, 1994.
- Dust Devils, University of Nevada Press, 1997.
- A Private War: An American Code Officer in the Belgian Congo. University of Nevada Press, 1998.
- The Land of My Fathers: A Son's Return to the Basque Country. University of Nevada Press, 1999.
- Time of the Rabies. University of Nevada Press, 2000.
- Travels With My Royal: A Memoir of the Writing Life. University of Nevada Press, 2001.

== Books and Selected Articles About Robert Laxalt ==
- Etulain, Richard. "Robert Laxalt: Basque Writer of the American West" in Portraits of Basques in the New World. University of Nevada Press; 1999. pp. 212–29.
- Lerude, Warren. Robert Laxalt: Stories of a Storyteller. Reno, Nevada: Center for Basque Studies, University of Nevada, Reno, 2013.
- Rio, David. Robert Laxalt: The Voice of the Basques in American Literature. Reno, Nevada: Center for Basque Studies, University of Nevada, Reno, 2007.
- Rio, David. "Robert Laxalt: A Basque Pioneer in the American Literary West." American Studies International; 2003 Oct; 41(3): 60–81.
- Rio Raigades, David; Urza, Carmelo, translator. "Identity and Transition in In a Hundred Graves: A Basque Portrait." Journal of the Society of Basque Studies in America; 1995; 15: 62–73.
