= Mike O'Callaghan =

American politician

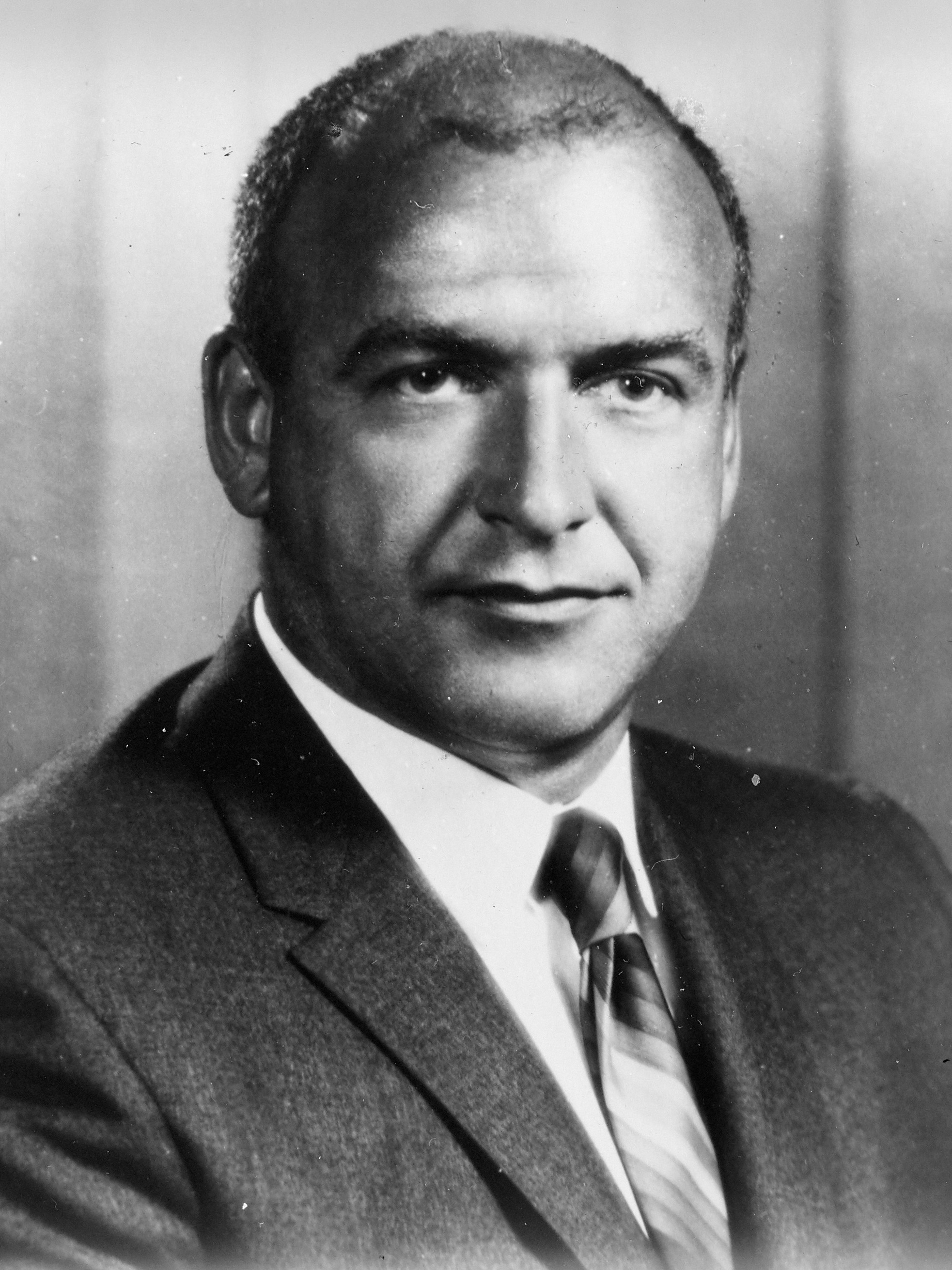
- O'Callaghan c. 1970s

23rd Governor of Nevada
- In office January 4, 1971 – January 1, 1979
- Lieutenant: Harry Reid (1971–1975); Robert E. Rose (1975–1979)
- Preceded by: Paul Laxalt
- Succeeded by: Robert List

Personal details
- Born: Donal Neil O'Callaghan; September 10, 1929 La Crosse, Wisconsin, U.S.
- Died: March 5, 2004 (aged 74) Paradise, Nevada, U.S.
- Cause of death: Heart attack
- Resting place: Southern Nevada Veterans Memorial Cemetery; Boulder City, Nevada, U.S.
- Party: Democratic
- Spouse: Carolyn Randall (m. 1954)
- Children: 5
- Education: University of Idaho

Military service
- Allegiance: United States
- Branch/service: United States Marine Corps; United States Air Force; United States Army
- Years of service: 1946–1948; 1950–1952
- Battles/wars: Korean War
- Awards: Bronze Star; Silver Star; Purple Heart

Donal Neil "Mike" O'Callaghan (September 10, 1929 – March 5, 2004) was an American politician and educator who served as the 23rd governor of Nevada from 1971 to 1979. He was a member of the Democratic Party.

== Early life ==
Born in La Crosse, Wisconsin, O'Callaghan later moved to Sparta, where his family subsistence farmed. He lied about his age to join the U.S. Marine Corps, at the age of 16 and served from 1946 to 1948.

He attended Boise Junior College and joined the U.S. Air Force in 1950 and served as an intelligence operator in the Aleutian Islands. O'Callaghan was transferred to the U.S. Army in 1952 to see combat and lost part of his left leg after being hit by a mortar round during a battle in the Korean War. He was awarded the Silver Star and Bronze Star and returned to the United States.

O'Callaghan resumed his college studies at the University of Idaho in Moscow, where he was a member of Tau Kappa Epsilon fraternity, and completed his bachelor's and master's degree in education in 1956, then became a high school teacher and boxing coach in Nevada. He was U.S. Senator Harry Reid's history teacher at Basic High School in Henderson and later promoted Reid's political career. From 1961 to 1963, he was the chief probation officer and director of court services for Clark County.

== Political career ==
O'Callaghan's political career began in 1963, when Governor Grant Sawyer appointed him to head the state's new department of health and welfare. In 1964, President Lyndon B. Johnson appointed O'Callaghan to be the regional director of the Office of Emergency Preparedness.

In 1966, O'Callaghan ran in the Democratic primary for lieutenant governor, but lost. In 1970, he received the Democratic gubernatorial nomination and won a surprising victory in the general election over his Republican opponent, Edward Fike. He proved to be an extremely popular governor and was re-elected in 1974 by a four-to-one margin, the greatest landslide in a gubernatorial election in state history.

The last Nevada governor before term limits, who was eligible for an elected third term, O'Callaghan chose not to run again in 1978. After he left office O'Callaghan became the executive editor of the Las Vegas Sun, a job he held until his death in 2004. He was also the publisher of the Henderson Home News and Boulder City News. In the 1990s, O'Callaghan monitored elections in Nicaragua and northern Iraq, and was a strong supporter of the nation of Israel.

== Death ==
Mike O'Callaghan died on March 5, 2004, of a heart attack at the age of 74, after collapsing during the morning mass hours at the Saint Viator Catholic Church in Paradise, Nevada. He was pronounced dead at Desert Springs Hospital. His widow Carolyn, a native of Twin Falls, Idaho, died seven months later on October 7, 2004, of complications from cardiac surgery, at the age of 68. They were married on August 21, 1954, in Twin Falls, Idaho and had five children; the former governor died one month before their 50th anniversary. Both are interred at the Southern Nevada Veterans Memorial Cemetery in Boulder City, Nevada.

== Legacy ==
O'Callaghan's legacy as Nevada politician and philanthropist survives through three structures that bear his name. Mike O'Callaghan Middle School opened on the east side of Las Vegas in 1991. The Mike O'Callaghan Federal Hospital is located on Nellis Air Force Base northeast of Las Vegas. A bridge that is a part of the highway bypass around the Hoover Dam, spanning the Colorado River between Nevada and Arizona, bears O'Callaghan's name, as well as that of former NFL Arizona Cardinals player and U.S. Army veteran Pat Tillman. Tillman died in a friendly fire incident in Afghanistan. The Mike O'Callaghan–Pat Tillman Memorial Bridge was completed on October 14, 2010. Also in 2010, The O'Callaghan Resource Integrated Oncology Network (ORION) Cancer Foundation, a nonprofit charity that assists cancer patients in Nevada was established in honor of Mike and Carolyn O'Callaghan, both cancer survivors.

Party political offices
Preceded by Grant Sawyer	Democratic nominee for Governor of Nevada; 1970, 1974	Succeeded by Robert E. Rose
Political offices
Preceded by Paul Laxalt	Governor of Nevada; January 4, 1971 – January 1, 1979	Succeeded by Robert List
