= Alan Bible =

American lawyer and politician

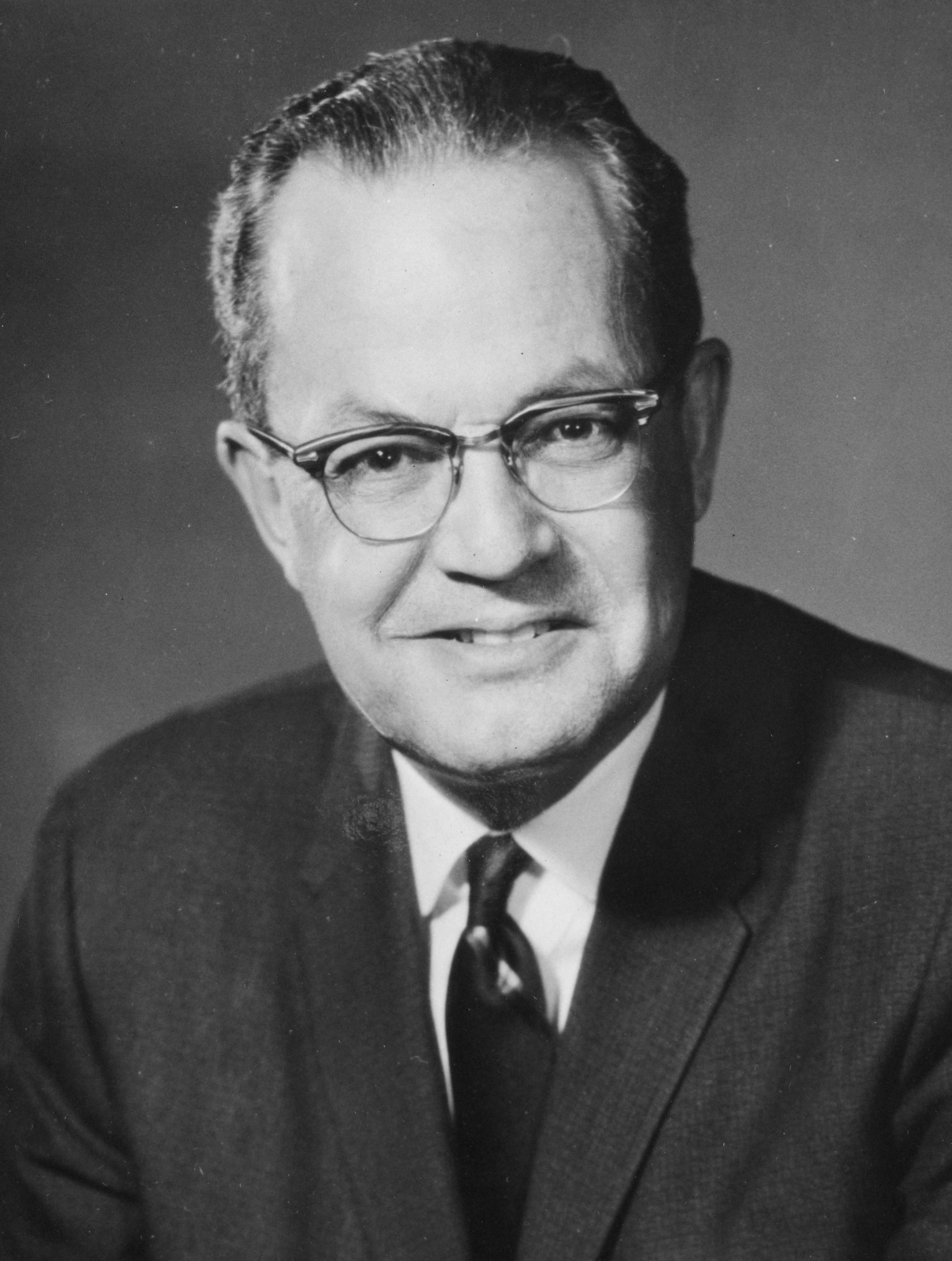
- Official portrait, 1968

United States Senator from Nevada
- In office December 2, 1954 – December 17, 1974
- Preceded by: Ernest S. Brown
- Succeeded by: Paul Laxalt

20th Attorney General of Nevada
- In office January 4, 1943 – January 8, 1951
- Governor: Edward P. Carville; Vail M. Pittman
- Preceded by: Gray Mashburn
- Succeeded by: William T. Mathews

Personal details
- Born: Alan Harvey Bible; November 20, 1909 Lovelock, Nevada, U.S.
- Died: September 12, 1988 (aged 78) Auburn, California, U.S.
- Party: Democratic
- Profession: Attorney

Alan Harvey Bible (November 20, 1909 – September 12, 1988) was an American lawyer and politician. A member of the Democratic Party, he served as a United States senator from Nevada from 1954 to 1974. He previously served as Attorney General of Nevada from 1943 to 1951.

== Early life and education ==
Alan Bible was born in Lovelock, Nevada, to Jacob Harvey and Isabel (née Welsh) Bible. His family was originally from Germany, and settled in Virginia; Bible's grandfather moved to Ohio before the Civil War and subsequently fought with the Union Army. His father operated a grocery store and a cattle ranch outside of Lovelock, while his mother worked as a schoolteacher. The family lived on their ranch until 1919, when a fire destroyed their home. They then moved to Fallon, where Bible attended Oats Park Grammar School and Churchill County High School. During high school, he was active in debating and served as president of the freshman and senior classes.

Bible then studied at the University of Nevada in Reno, from where he earned a bachelor's degree in economics in 1930. He joined the Lambda Chi Alpha fraternity in his sophomore year, and became class treasurer and assistant editor of The Sagebrush in his junior year. In 1934, Bible earned his law degree from Georgetown University Law School in Washington, D.C. While studying in Washington, he was given a job as an elevator operator in the Capitol Building by Senator Pat McCarran.

== Early career ==
Bible was admitted to the Nevada bar in 1935 and joined Senator McCarran's law firm in Reno. Six months later, he was appointed district attorney of Storey County, a position he held for three years. He became active in the affairs of the Democratic Party, organizing a chapter of the Young Democrats and helping select delegates to the state Democratic Committee. He also became a prominent member of the political machine run by Senator McCarran. From 1938 to 1942, he served as deputy Attorney General of Nevada.

In 1939, Bible married Loucile Shields; the couple had one daughter, Debra, and three sons, Paul, William, and David. He was elected Attorney General of Nevada in 1942, defeating Republican candidate John Rolly Ross by more than 7,000 votes. During his tenure, he strengthened the state's power to regulate the gambling industry and became an expert in water law. He served as attorney general until 1950, when he returned to private practice.

== United States Senator ==
In 1952, Bible was narrowly defeated for the Democratic nomination for the United States Senate, losing to political newcomer Thomas B. Mechling by 475 votes. However, after the death of Senator McCarran in September 1954, Bible was elected to the Senate the following November to fill the remainder of McCarran's term. He defeated Republican Ernest S. Brown, who had been appointed to McCarran's seat by Governor Charles H. Russell, by a margin of 58%-42%.

Bible was reelected in 1956, 1962, and 1968 defeating Republicans Clarence Clifton Young, William B. Wright, and Edward Fike respectively, and represented Nevada in the United States Senate from December 2, 1954, until his resignation on December 17, 1974. He did not run for reelection in 1974; Republican Paul Laxalt defeated Democratic nominee Harry Reid. Bible's resignation enabled the governor to appoint Laxalt to fill the vacancy, giving him seniority over other senators elected in 1974. After leaving the Senate, Bible was elected to the Board of Directors of Bally Manufacturing Corporation.

During his time in the United States Senate, he was chairman of the Committee on the District of Columbia (Eighty-fifth through Ninetieth Congresses), the Joint Committee on Washington Metropolitan Problems (Eighty-fifth and Eighty-sixth Congresses), and the U.S. Senate Select Committee on Small Business (Ninety-first through Ninety-third Congresses).

== Later life and death ==
Bible died on September 12, 1988, at the age of 78. He is buried in Reno, Nevada.

Party political offices
Preceded by Pat McCarran	Democratic nominee for U.S. Senator from Nevada (Class 3); 1954, 1956, 1962, 1968	Succeeded by Harry Reid
U.S. Senate
Preceded by Ernest S. Brown	U.S. senator (Class 3) from Nevada; December 2, 1954 – December 17, 1974; Served alongside: George W. Malone, Howard Cannon	Succeeded by Paul Laxalt
Political offices
Preceded by George Smathers	Chairman of the Senate Small Business Committee; 1969–1974	Succeeded by Gaylord Nelson
