= University of Nevada Press =

American public university press

- Parent company: Nevada System of Higher Education
- Founded: 1961
- Founder: Robert Laxalt
- Country of origin: United States
- Headquarters location: Reno, Nevada
- Distribution: Chicago Distribution Center (US); Scholarly Book Services (Canada); Eurospan Group (EMEA, Latin America); East-West Export Books (Asia, the Pacific)
- Publication types: Books
- Official website: unpress.nevada.edu

University of Nevada Press is a university press that is run by the Nevada System of Higher Education (NSHE). Its authority is derived from the Nevada state legislature and Board of Regents of the NSHE. It was founded by Robert Laxalt in 1961. It is owned and operated by the University of Nevada. The university is in Reno, Nevada.

== See also ==
- List of English-language book publishing companies
- List of university presses
