= Finley, Kumble, Wagner, Heine, Underberg, Manley, Myerson & Casey =

Defunct American law firm

Finley, Kumble, Wagner, Heine, Underberg, Manley, Myerson & Casey, also known as Finley, Kumble, was a United States law firm founded in 1968. The firm, based in New York, had grown from eight lawyers at its inception to over 700 lawyers at the time of its bankruptcy and dissolution in 1987. At the time it dissolved, Finley, Kumble was the fourth largest law firm in the United States, and at its peak was the country's second largest firm, behind only the international firm Baker & McKenzie.

== Management style ==
Finley, Kumble is among the first American law firms to reject traditional, collegial legal management protocols, such as the Cravath System, in favor of operating similar to a conventional business. The firm routinely recruited partners from other firms and shunned seniority-based partner compensation, in favor of paying greater salaries to those partners who generated the most business — strategies that have since become common in the legal industry.

== Demise ==
The firm's precipitous demise is believed to have been caused by infighting among its partners and excessive debt incurred by the firm's famous practice of paying exorbitant salaries to prominent and well-connected attorneys to entice them to join the firm as partners, including former United States Senators Joseph Tydings, Paul Laxalt, and Russell B. Long, as well as by its rapid expansion, including the addition of firm offices in cities around the United States and the United Kingdom. By the time it folded, the firm had debts in excess of $120 million.

== Notable partners and clients ==
The firm hired former U.S. Senators Joseph Tydings, Paul Laxalt, and Russell B. Long as partners. Other notable partners include former governor of New York, Hugh L. Carey, former mayor of New York, Robert F. Wagner Jr., and former New York attorney general Nathaniel L. Goldstein. Businessman Rick Caruso was employed as an associate at the firm prior to starting his real estate business.

Notable clients included Citibank, Mobil, Donald Trump, the United States Football League, Occidental Petroleum Co. and the government of Israel.

== Media coverage ==
- Legal writer Steven Brill covered the rise and fall of the firm in the pages of his magazine American Lawyer. This coverage was controversial due to his social relationship with firm partner Marshall Manley and others within the firm.
- The firm's rise and fall was chronicled in the book Shark Tank by Kim Isaac Eisler.
- Former named partner Steven Kumble also authored a history of the firm, entitled Conduct Unbecoming: The Rise and Ruin of Finley, Kumble.
