= Mary Gojack =

American politician

Member of the Nevada Senate from the 23rd district
- In office November 6, 1974 – November 8, 1978

Member of the Nevada Assembly
- In office November 8, 1972 – November 6, 1974

Personal details
- Born: February 19, 1936 Hillsboro, Iowa, U.S.
- Died: November 12, 1985 (aged 49) Reno, Nevada, U.S.
- Party: Democratic
- Education: University of Nevada, Reno (BA, MA)

Mary Gojack (February 19, 1936 – November 12, 1985) was an American politician who served in the Nevada Assembly from 1972 to 1974 and in the Nevada Senate from 1974 to 1978.

She died of cancer on November 12, 1985, in Reno, Nevada at the age of 49.

Party political offices
Preceded by Harry Reid	Democratic nominee for U.S. Senator from Nevada (Class 3); 1980	Succeeded by Harry Reid
