= 2000 United States Senate election in Nevada =

- November 7, 2000
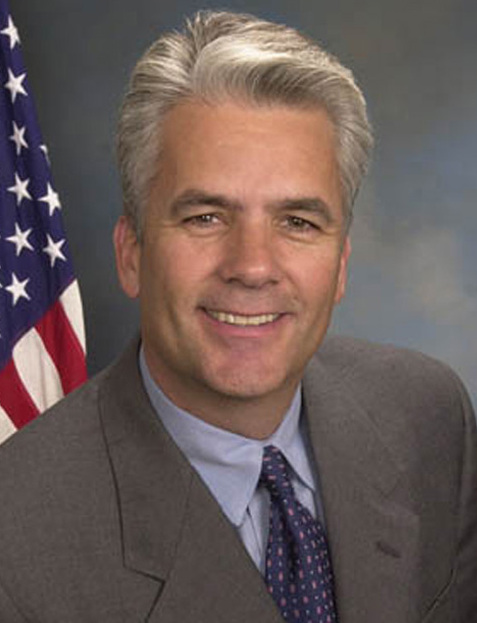

| Nominee | John Ensign | Ed Bernstein |
| Party | Republican | Democratic |
| Popular vote | 330,687 | 238,260 |
| Percentage | 55.09% | 39.69% |
- County results Ensign: 50–60% 60–70% 70–80% 80–90%
U.S. senator before election
Richard Bryan
Democratic
Elected U.S. Senator
John Ensign
Republican

The 2000 United States Senate election in Nevada was held on November 7, 2000. Democratic incumbent Richard Bryan retired retire instead of seeking a third term. Republican John Ensign won the open seat, defeating Ed Bernstein in a landslide. George W. Bush carried the state by a very narrow margin in the concurrent presidential race.

== Background ==
Democratic incumbent Richard Bryan had first been elected in 1988 and was re-elected comfortably in 1994 despite a national Republican wave. When he announced his retirement on February 18, 1999, many observers expected that there would be a competitive race for the open seat. Immediately, both parties sought top recruits, with Democrats recruiting former governor Bob Miller and Republicans seeking former congressman and 1998 nominee John Ensign.

== Democratic primary ==
=== Candidates ===
- Ed Bernstein, attorney and talk show host

==== Withdrew ====
- Frankie Sue Del Papa, Nevada attorney general

==== Declined ====
- Richard Bryan, incumbent U.S. senator since 1989
- Bob Miller, former governor of Nevada (1989–99)

Despite heavy interest in a Miller candidacy, he announced on March 15, 1999 that he would not run for Senate. With Miller out of the running, the next credible challenger was attorney general Frankie Sue Del Papa. However, she withdrew in September 1999, citing a lack of fundraising. In the end, wealthy attorney and talk show host Ed Bernstein was unopposed for the nomination.

=== Results ===
Bernstein was unopposed in the Democratic primary.

== Republican primary ==
=== Candidates ===
- John Ensign, former U.S. representative from Las Vegas and 1998 nominee for Senate
- Richard Hamzik
- Fernando Platin Jr.

Ensign, a former congressman, lost the 1998 Senate election to Harry Reid by a narrow margin of 401 votes. After the loss, Ensign considered retiring from politics, but Bryan's retirement shook up these plans and Ensign became a top recruit for the Republican Party and raised large sums of campaign funds.

=== Results ===
Ensign faced only token opposition in the Republican primary.

Republican primary results
| Party | Candidate | Votes | % |
|---|---|---|---|
| Republican | John Ensign | 95,904 | 88.03 |
| Republican | Richard Hamzik | 6,202 | 5.69 |
| Republican | None of these candidates | 5,290 | 4.86 |
| Republican | Fernando Platin, Jr. | 1,543 | 1.42 |
| Total votes | | 108,939 | 100.00 |

== General election ==
=== Candidates ===
- Ernie Berghof (Independent American)
- Ed Bernstein, attorney and talk show host (Democratic)
- John Ensign, former U.S. representative from Las Vegas and 1998 nominee for Senate (Republican)
- Bill Grutzmacher (Citizens First)
- J.J. Johnson (Libertarian)
- Kathryn Rusco (Green)

=== Campaign ===
Ensign was the favorite, leading in polls by double digits and significantly outraising his opponent. Bernstein countered by loaning his campaign nearly $1 million of his own money.

On August 31, Ensign's campaign was hurt by comments to the Associated Press in which he said that he considered tax-payer funded abortion worse than rape; Bernstein used the comments in attack ads. Ensign said that he misspoke and released advertisements that emphasized his support from pro-choice women and his record of supporting federal funding for breast cancer screening, research, and treatment. Bernstein also highlighted the high prices of prescription drugs by taking a group of senior citizens to Mexico to purchase prescription drugs.

Ensign maintained a comfortable lead in polling in the closing weeks of the race.

=== Debates ===
- Complete video of debate, October 10, 2000
- Complete video of debate, October 20, 2000

=== Polling ===
| Poll source | Date(s) | Sample size | Margin of error | John Ensign (R) | Ed Bernstein (D) | Other / undecided (Note: Calculated by taking the difference of 100% and all other candidates combined.) |
|---|---|---|---|---|---|---|
| Harris Insights & Analytics | November 3, 2000 | 1,833 | — | 52% | 43% | 5% |
| SurveyUSA | November 1, 2000 | 500 | — | 55% | 39% | 6% |
| Mason-Dixon Polling & Strategy | October 27, 2000 | 625 | — | 54% | 37% | 9% |
| Rasmussen Reports | October 23, 2000 | 817 | — | 54% | 37% | 9% |

=== Results ===
On election night, Ensign won comfortably, winning every county and ending a twelve-year losing streak for Nevada Republicans in races for U.S. Senate.

General election results
| Party | Candidate | Votes | % | ±% |
|---|---|---|---|---|
| Republican | John Ensign | 330,687 | 55.09% | +14.09% |
| Democratic | Edward M. Bernstein | 238,260 | 39.69% | −11.24% |
| None of These Candidates | | 11,503 | 1.92% | -1.40% |
| Green | Kathryn Rusco | 10,286 | 1.71% | |
| Libertarian | J.J. Johnson | 5,395 | 0.90% | −0.67% |
| Independent American | Ernie Berghof | 2,540 | 0.42% | −1.01% |
| Independent | Bill Grutzmacher | 1,579 | 0.26% | |
| Majority | | 92,427 | 15.40% | +5.47% |
| Turnout | | 600,250 | | |
| Republican gain from Democratic | | | | |

==== By county ====
| County | John Ensign Republican | | Ed Bernstein Democratic | | Various candidates Other parties | | Margin | | Total |
| County | # | % | # | % | # | % | # | % | Total |
|---|---|---|---|---|---|---|---|---|---|
| Carson City | 11,973 | 60.9% | 6,369 | 32.9% | 1,194 | 6.2% | 5,424 | 28.0% | 19,356 |
| Churchill | 6,453 | 73.4% | 1,941 | 22.1% | 399 | 4.5% | 4,512 | 51.3% | 8,793 |
| Clark | 190,071 | 50.7% | 168,039 | 44.8% | 16,675 | 4.5% | 22,032 | 5.9% | 374,785 |
| Douglas | 12,027 | 67.1% | 4,795 | 26.7% | 1,106 | 6.1% | 7,232 | 40.4% | 17,928 |
| Elko | 11,303 | 80.2% | 2,120 | 15.0% | 674 | 5.7% | 9,183 | 65.2% | 14,097 |
| Esmeralda | 334 | 68.3% | 109 | 22.3% | 46 | 9.4% | 225 | 46.0% | 489 |
| Eureka | 630 | 75.2% | 154 | 18.4% | 54 | 6.4% | 476 | 56.8% | 838 |
| Humboldt | 3,723 | 74.0% | 1,006 | 20.0% | 303 | 6.1% | 2,717 | 54.0% | 5,032 |
| Lander | 1,609 | 76.5% | 364 | 17.3% | 131 | 6.2% | 1,245 | 59.2% | 2,104 |
| Lincoln | 1,402 | 72.9% | 418 | 21.7% | 102 | 5.2% | 984 | 51.2% | 1,922 |
| Lyon | 7,789 | 65.5% | 3,343 | 28.1% | 762 | 6.4% | 4,446 | 37.4% | 11,984 |
| Mineral | 1,272 | 55.9% | 854 | 37.5% | 151 | 6.7% | 418 | 18.4% | 2,277 |
| Nye | 7,362 | 60.6% | 4,150 | 34.1% | 641 | 5.3% | 3,212 | 26.5% | 12,153 |
| Pershing | 1,262 | 70.4% | 410 | 22.9% | 120 | 6.7% | 852 | 47.5% | 1,792 |
| Storey | 1,108 | 62.4% | 543 | 30.6% | 124 | 7.0% | 565 | 31.8% | 1,775 |
| Washoe | 70,161 | 57.8% | 42,672 | 35.1% | 8,646 | 7.2% | 27,489 | 23.7% | 121,479 |
| White Pine | 2,388 | 67.5% | 973 | 27.5% | 175 | 5.0% | 1,415 | 40.0% | 3,536 |
| Totals | 330,687 | 55.1% | 238,260 | 39.7% | 31,303 | 5.2% | 92,427 | 15.4% | 600,250 |

Counties that flipped from Democratic to Republican

- Carson City
- Clark (largest municipality: Las Vegas)
- Humboldt (largest municipality: Winnemucca)
- Lyon (largest municipality: Fernley)
- Mineral (largest municipality: Hawthorne)
- Pershing (largest municipality: Lovelock)
- Storey (largest municipality: Virginia City)
- Washoe (largest municipality: Reno)
- White Pine (largest municipality: Ely)

== See also ==
- 2000 United States Senate elections
