= 1998 United States Senate election in Nevada =

- November 3, 1998

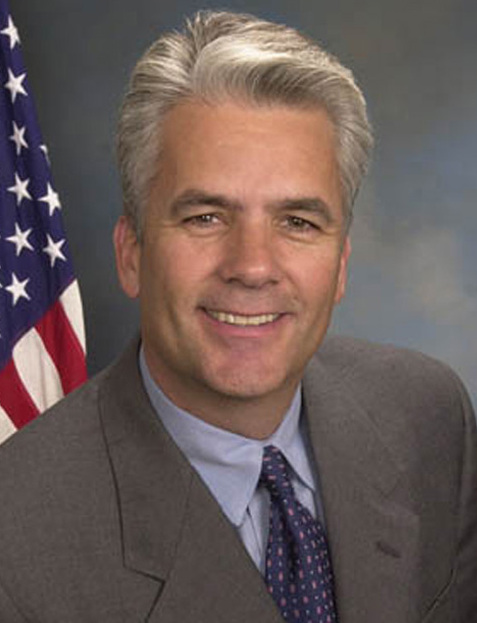
Nominee	Harry Reid	John Ensign
Party	Democratic	Republican
Popular vote	208,621	208,220
Percentage	47.86%	47.77%
- County results Reid: 50–60% Ensign: 40–50% 50–60% 60–70% 70–80%
U.S. senator before election
Harry Reid
Democratic
Elected U.S. Senator
Harry Reid
Democratic

The 1998 United States Senate election in Nevada was held on November 3, 1998. Democratic incumbent Harry Reid won re-election to a third term over Republican congressman John Ensign. Reid won by a margin of only 401 votes, making this the closest race of the 1998 Senate elections.

== Republican primary ==
=== Candidates ===
- John Ensign, U.S. representative from Las Vegas
- Ralph W. Stephens

=== Results ===
Republican primary results
Party	Candidate	Votes	%
Republican	John Ensign	105,263	80.57%
Republican	Ralph W. Stephens	13,679	10.47%
Republican	None of these candidates	11,704	8.96%
Total votes		130,646	100.00%

== General election ==
=== Candidates ===
- Michael Cloud (Libertarian)
- John Ensign, U.S. representative from Las Vegas (Republican)
- Harry Reid, incumbent U.S. senator since 1987 (Democratic)
- Michael Williams (Natural Law)

=== Campaign ===
Early in the campaign, Reid held a double-digit lead over Ensign in most polls. After a fierce battle of attack ads on television by both candidates, Ensign pulled into a dead heat with Reid. This reversal of fortune was attributed to several factors. More than 125,000 new residents had arrived in Nevada since 1992, many of them settling in Ensign's suburban Clark County congressional district. As such, many of them were more familiar with Ensign than with Reid, whose previous Republican opponents had hailed from other regions of the state. Republican consultant John Maddox observed that Ensign's greater familiarity to the Las Vegas metropolitan region gave him an advantage, adding that "he has won votes from Democrats who have never voted for Reid." In contrast, Reid was believed to hold an advantage with longtime Nevada residents, particularly those in slower-growing regions of the state. In addition, the number of registered Republicans in Nevada had dramatically increased as well; in 1992, Democrats had held an advantage of approximately 40,000 registered voters, but by 1998 Republicans outnumbered Democrats by 4,000. Jon Ralston, a political analyst in Las Vegas, claimed that Reid was also hurt by declining voter enthusiasm in the wake of the Monica Lewinsky scandal. Reid had been one of the first senators to express dissatisfaction with President Clinton over the scandal, describing the president's behavior as "immoral."

During the campaign, Reid cited his efforts to block the storage of nuclear waste at the Yucca Mountain repository, while also using the issue to attack Ensign. In one campaign speech, Reid claimed, "You send Ensign to the Senate, you send nuclear waste to Nevada." Ensign responded to the attacks by pointing out his own position against the depository and indicated he would work with Richard Bryan, the state's other senator, to stop it. "Bryan's a Democrat who works with Republicans," he said, "and I'm a Republican who works with Democrats." The Reid campaign also attacked Ensign as an "extremist" who would weaken Social Security and referred to environmentalists as "socialists." Ensign, meanwhile accused Reid of supporting tax increases in Washington even as he claimed to support lower taxes at home.

=== Polling ===
Poll source	Date(s)	Sample size (Note: Key: A – all adults RV – registered voters LV – likely voters V – unclear)	Margin of error	Harry Reid (D)	John Ensign (R)	Other / undecided (Note: Calculated by taking the difference of 100% and all other candidates combined.)
Mason-Dixon Polling & Strategy	October 25–27, 1998	817 (LV)	± 3.5%	47%	45%	8%
FM3 Research (D) (Note: Poll conducted for Harry Reid.)	October 13, 1998	488	—	49%	44%	7%
Mason-Dixon Polling & Strategy	September 26–28, 1998	814 (LV)	± 3.5%	45%	44%	11%
Mason-Dixon Polling & Strategy	August 24–26, 1998	838 (LV)	± 3.5%	46%	41%	13%
Mason-Dixon Polling & Strategy	July 29 – August 4, 1998	837 (LV)	± 3.5%	46%	40%	14%
Mason-Dixon Polling & Strategy	June 8–10, 1998	808 (RV)	± 3.5%	44%	41%	15%
Mason-Dixon Polling & Strategy	February 19–21, 1998	804 (RV)	± 3.5%	45%	36%	19%

=== Results ===
On November 3, 1998, Reid won by 401 votes in an exceptionally close election. Ensign did not contest the results, and was elected to Nevada's other Senate seat in 2000, succeeding the retiring Richard Bryan and served with Reid until 2011.

General election results
Party	Candidate	Votes	%	±%
Democratic	Harry Reid (incumbent)	208,621	47.86%	−3.19%
Republican	John Ensign	208,220	47.77%	+7.56%
Libertarian	Michael Cloud	8,129	1.87%	+0.41%
None of These Candidates		8,113	1.86%	-0.79%
Natural Law	Michael E. Williams	2,781	0.64%	−0.83%
Turnout		435,864	100.00%	
Democratic hold		Swing		

==== County results ====
County	Reid	%	Ensign	%	Others	%
Carson City	7,029	42.2%	8,699	52.2%	930	5.6%
Churchill	1,594	22.0%	5,260	72.5%	402	5.5%
Clark	134,163	52.6%	111,718	43.8%	8,961	3.5%
Douglas	4,766	33.3%	8,810	61.6%	715	5.0%
Elko	2,589	25.7%	7,051	69.9%	453	4.5%
Esmeralda	151	28.0%	343	63.5%	46	8.5%
Eureka	162	24.0%	461	68.2%	53	7.8%
Humboldt	1,601	37.7%	2,428	57.1%	220	5.2%
Lander	704	34.0%	1,209	58.4%	156	7.5%
Lincoln	616	31.4%	1,238	63.1%	109	5.6%
Lyon	3,242	34.8%	5,486	58.9%	585	6.3%
Mineral	1,176	54.3%	822	37.9%	169	7.8%
Nye	4,052	42.7%	4,912	51.7%	533	5.6%
Pershing	577	36.9%	902	57.7%	85	5.4%
Storey	691	41.3%	838	50.1%	144	8.6%
Washoe	44,118	46.1%	46,300	48.4%	5,194	5.4%
White Pine	1,419	42.7%	1,745	52.4%	163	5.9%

Counties and independent cities that flipped from Democratic to Republican

- Carson City
- Washoe
- White Pine

== See also ==
- 1998 United States Senate elections
