= Charles Woods (politician) =

American politician (1920-2004)

Personal details
- Born: Charles Arthur Morris; September 30, 1920 Dothan, Alabama, U.S.
- Died: October 17, 2004 (aged 84)
- Party: Democratic
- Occupation: Businessman, broadcaster, politician

Military service
- Allegiance: Canada; United States
- Branch/service: Royal Canadian Air Force (1941); United States Army Air Corps (1941–1944)
- Years of service: 1941–1944
- Rank: Major
- War: World War II

Charles Woods (September 30, 1920 – October 17, 2004) was an Alabama businessman and broadcaster, and aspiring politician. Woods was raised in an orphanage. He enlisted in the Royal Canadian Air Force before joining the U.S. Army Air Corps in World War II. He was a decorated pilot with the Air Corps.

== Early life and education ==
He was born Charles Arthur Morris. His divorced mother was unable to support her two young sons so she placed them in a state orphanage when he was five years old. He never saw her again and aged 6 was adopted by P. A. Woods family from Headland, Alabama. He attended schools in Hollywood, California, where his new family lived for some time, and in Headland.

== Military career ==
Woods joined the RCAF and the United States Army Air Corps in 1941, eventually rising to the rank of Major.

Woods was severely injured in a 1944 airplane crash on December 23. He taxied down a runway in Kurmitola, India, carrying 28,000 pounds (12.7 tons) of aviation fuel to be delivered in Luliang, China. After making the trip alone, hundreds of times, on this particular trip, he was flying with a pilot-in-training, Captain Stalmacher, in first seat. Stalmacher erred on take-off, braking too soon causing the airplane to lose speed with too little runway left. The bomber exploded on take-off, and Woods was the only crew member who survived. He had severe burns over 70% of his body. The fire erased his face, destroying his nose, eyelids, ears and hands. He was transported to Valley Forge General Hospital, a military hospital in Pennsylvania six weeks after the accident. Since he was so weak, he could only travel short legs at one time. The 10,000 mile (16,000 km) trip proved arduous to Woods who arrived at Valley Forge malnourished, dehydrated and suffering from infections in addition to being severely burned.

Woods, severely burned, was dying and needed new skin. In desperation, skin was taken from a recently dead soldier, with his family's permission, and was draped onto Woods. This "foreign" skin normally would have been rejected by Woods's immune system within 10 to 14 days—too soon for his own skin to grow back. However, the new skin survived for more than a month, buying Woods just enough time to save his life. This breakthrough led to the development of techniques for organ transplant. He was a patient of Dr. Joseph Murray at Valley Forge General Hospital from 1945 to 1947. Murray won the Nobel Prize in Physiology or Medicine in 1990 for work in organ and cell transplantation. Woods and his case is featured in Dr. Murray's 2001 autobiography, Surgery Of The Soul: Reflections on a Curious Career.

Over the next two years, Woods was operated on 24 times to construct a new face, often with very little anesthesia.

== Radio and politics ==
Woods prevailed and began a very successful career in construction and in radio and television stations. He built a multimillion-dollar empire in franchises all over the country. He owned WTVY in Dothan, Alabama from its early years until 2000, in addition to other radio and television stations. He ran for governor and lieutenant governor of Alabama, once running against George Wallace. He was known for his long-form self-purchased television campaign commercials.

He came close to winning the Democratic nomination for Alabama Lieutenant Governor in 1974, leading in the first round of voting but losing in a runoff to incumbent Jere Beasley.

In Nevada, he had a respectable performance in the Democratic primary against Harry Reid in 1992, although Reid won re-election in the primary and the general election. Woods also sought the Democratic nomination for president in 1992 as a long-shot candidate. He showed best in North Dakota, winning 20.26% after write-in winner Ross Perot, Lyndon LaRouche and before eventual nominee and President of the United States Bill Clinton.

His presidential bid slogan was The Businessman's Approach.

Woods then ran in the Republican primaries for US Senate elections in Nevada in 1994 and Alabama in 1996, but lost in the primaries both times. In 2000 and 2002, he won the Democratic nominations to run in Alabama's second Congressional district, and was defeated by Republican Terry Everett twice. Despite the intense suffering he underwent, he always said, "I consider myself an ordinary man greatly blessed by God."

== Personal life ==
Woods lived in Dothan, Alabama until his death in 2004. He was buried in Arlington National Cemetery.

== Electoral history ==
Alabama gubernatorial election, 1966 (Democratic primary)

- Lurleen Wallace – 480,841 (54.10%)
- Richmond Flowers – 172,386 (19.40%)
- Carl Elliott – 71,972 (8.10%)
- Bob Gilchrist – 49,502 (5.57%)
- Charles Woods – 41,148 (4.63%)
- John Malcolm Patterson – 31,011 (3.49%)
- Jim Folsom – 24,145 (2.72%)
- A.W. Todd – 9,013 (1.01%)

Alabama gubernatorial election, 1970 (Democratic primary)

- Albert Brewer – (Inc.) 428,146 (41.98%)
- George Wallace – 416,443 (40.84%)
- Charles Woods – 149,987 (14.71%)
- Asa Carter – 15,441 (1.51%)
- Jim Folsom – 4,123 (0.40%)
- Coleman Brown – 2,836 (0.28%)
- Shorty Price – 2,804 (0.28%)

Alabama lieutenant gubernatorial election, 1974 (Democratic primary)

- Charles Woods – 310,351 (38.68%)
- Jere Beasley (Inc.) – 308,182 (38.41%)
- Richard Dominick – 150,455 (18.75%)
- Ron Careel – 25,392 (3.17%)
- Coleman Brown – 7,943 (0.99%)

Alabama lieutenant gubernatorial election, 1974 (Democratic runoff)

- Jere Beasley – 393,077 (56.10%)
- Charles Woods – 307,643 (43.90%)

Alabama gubernatorial election, 1978 (Democratic primary)

- Fob James – 256,196 (28.47%)
- Bill Baxley – 210,089 (23.35%)
- Albert Brewer – 193,479 (21.50%)
- Sid McDonald – 143,930 (15.99%)
- Jere Beasley – 77,202 (8.58%)
- K.C. Foster – 4,948 (0.55%)
- Horace Howell – 4,730 (0.53%)
- Jim Folsom – 4,632 (0.52%)
- Bob Muncaster – 1,776 (0.20%)
- Shorty Price – 1,396 (0.16%)
- Charles Woods – 700 (0.08%)
- Fred Sandefer – 622 (0.07%)
- Cornelia Wallace – 217 (0.02%)

1992 United States presidential election (Democratic primary)

- Bill Clinton – 10,482,411 (52.01%)
- Jerry Brown – 4,071,232 (20.20%)
- Paul Tsongas – 3,656,010 (18.14%)
- Unpledged – 750,873 (3.73%)
- Bob Kerrey – 318,457 (1.58%)
- Tom Harkin – 280,304 (1.39%)
- Lyndon LaRouche – 154,599 (0.77%)
- Eugene McCarthy – 108,678 (0.54%)
- Charles Woods – 88,948 (0.44%)
- Larry Agran – 58,611 (0.29%)
- Ross Perot (write-in) – 54,755 (0.27%)
- Ralph Nader (write-in) – 35,935 (0.18%)
- Louis J. Stokes – 29,983 (0.15%)

United States Senate election in Nevada, 1992 (Democratic primary)

- Harry Reid (Inc.) – 64,828 (52.82%)
- Charles Woods – 48,364 (39.40%)

United States Senate election in Nevada, 1994 (Republican primary)

- Harold Furman – 58,521 (50.46%)
- Charles Woods – 29,601 (25.52%)

United States Senate election in Alabama, 1996 (Republican primary)

- Jeff Sessions – 82,373 (37.81%)
- Sid McDonald – 47,320 (21.72%)
- Charles Woods – 24,409 (11.20%)
- Frank McRight – 21,964 (10.08%)
- Walter D. Clark – 18,745 (8.60%)
- Jimmy Blake – 15,385 (7.06%)
- Albert Libscomb – 7,672 (3.52%)

U.S. House of Representatives, Alabama's 2nd district (2000)

- Terry Everett (R, incumbent) – 151,830 (68.20%)
- Charles Woods (D) – 64,958 (29.18%)
- Wallace B. McGahan (L) – 4,111 (1.85%)

U.S. House of Representatives, Alabama's 2nd district (2002)

- Terry Everett (R, incumbent) – 129,233 (68.75%)
- Charles Woods (D) – 55,495 (29.52%)
- Floyd Shackelford (L) – 2,948 (1.57%)
