= 1986 Nevada gubernatorial election =

- November 4, 1986
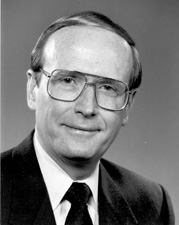

| Nominee | Richard Bryan | Patty Cafferata |
| Party | Democratic | Republican |
| Popular vote | 187,268 | 65,081 |
| Percentage | 71.92% | 25.00% |
- County results Bryan: 50–60% 60–70% 70–80% 80–90%
Governor before election
Richard Bryan
Democratic
Elected Governor
Richard Bryan
Democratic

The 1986 Nevada gubernatorial election took place on November 4, 1986. Incumbent Democrat Richard Bryan won re-election to a second term as Governor of Nevada, defeating Republican nominee Patty Cafferata.

== Democratic primary ==
=== Candidates ===
- Richard Bryan, incumbent governor of Nevada
- Herb Tobman

=== Results ===
Democratic primary results
| Party | Candidate | Votes | % |
|---|---|---|---|
| Democratic | Richard Bryan (incumbent) | 71,920 | 79.95% |
| Democratic | Herb Tobman | 13,776 | 15.31% |
| | None of These Candidates | 4,264 | 4.74% |
| Total votes | | 89,960 | 100.00% |

== Republican primary ==
=== Candidates ===
- Patty Cafferata, state treasurer
- Jim Stone
- Joni Wines
- M.L. "Smokey" Stover
- Robert A. Swartz

=== Results ===
Republican Primary results
| Party | Candidate | Votes | % |
|---|---|---|---|
| Republican | Patty Cafferata | 31,430 | 46.03% |
| | None of These Candidates | 15,116 | 22.15% |
| Republican | Jim Stone | 12,296 | 18.02% |
| Republican | Joni Wines | 5,599 | 8.21% |
| Republican | M.L. "Smokey" Stover | 2,236 | 3.28% |
| Republican | Robert A. Swartz | 1,559 | 2.29% |
| Total votes | | 68,236 | 100.00% |

== General election ==
=== Candidates ===
- Richard Bryan (D), incumbent governor of Nevada
- Patty Cafferata (R), state treasurer
- Lou Tomburello (L)

=== Results ===
1986 Nevada gubernatorial election result
| Party | Candidate | Votes | % | ±% |
|---|---|---|---|---|
| Democratic | Richard Bryan (incumbent) | 187,268 | 71.92% | +18.48% |
| Republican | Patty Cafferata | 65,081 | 25.00% | −16.76% |
| | None of These Candidates | 5,471 | 2.10% | −0.77% |
| Libertarian | Lou Tomburello | 2,555 | 0.98% | −0.96% |
| Majority | | 122,187 | 46.93% | |
| Total votes | | 260,375 | 100.00% | |
| Democratic hold | | Swing | +35.24% | |

=== County results ===
| County | Richard Bryan Democratic | | Patty Cafferata Republican | | None of These Candidates | | Lou Tomburello Libertarian | | Margin | | Total votes cast |
| County | # | % | # | % | # | % | # | % | # | % | Total votes cast |
|---|---|---|---|---|---|---|---|---|---|---|---|
| Carson City | 9,224 | 70.61% | 3,308 | 25.32% | 393 | 3.01% | 138 | 1.06% | 5,916 | 45.29% | 13,063 |
| Churchill | 3,426 | 64.03% | 1,788 | 33.41% | 107 | 2.00% | 30 | 0.56% | 1,638 | 30.61% | 5,351 |
| Clark | 98,262 | 74.33% | 30,258 | 22.89% | 2,582 | 1.95% | 1,103 | 0.83% | 68,004 | 51.44% | 132,205 |
| Douglas | 5,270 | 63.27% | 2,750 | 33.02% | 209 | 2.51% | 100 | 1.20% | 2,520 | 30.26% | 8,329 |
| Elko | 3,306 | 52.30% | 2,850 | 45.09% | 95 | 1.50% | 70 | 1.11% | 456 | 7.21% | 6,321 |
| Esmeralda | 363 | 62.91% | 183 | 31.72% | 19 | 3.29% | 12 | 2.08% | 180 | 31.20% | 577 |
| Eureka | 297 | 52.66% | 256 | 45.39% | 11 | 1.95% | 0 | 0.00% | 41 | 7.27% | 564 |
| Humboldt | 1,999 | 64.11% | 1,025 | 32.87% | 65 | 2.08% | 29 | 0.93% | 974 | 31.24% | 3,118 |
| Lander | 1,053 | 62.83% | 553 | 33.00% | 49 | 2.92% | 21 | 1.25% | 500 | 29.83% | 1,676 |
| Lincoln | 915 | 58.99% | 569 | 36.69% | 55 | 3.55% | 12 | 0.77% | 346 | 22.31% | 1,551 |
| Lyon | 4,306 | 70.60% | 1,620 | 26.56% | 119 | 1.95% | 54 | 0.89% | 2,686 | 44.04% | 6,099 |
| Mineral | 1,635 | 72.25% | 554 | 24.48% | 51 | 2.25% | 23 | 1.02% | 1,081 | 47.77% | 2,263 |
| Nye | 2,630 | 60.14% | 1,565 | 35.79% | 119 | 2.72% | 59 | 1.35% | 1,065 | 24.35% | 4,373 |
| Pershing | 843 | 68.54% | 357 | 29.02% | 22 | 1.79% | 8 | 0.65% | 486 | 39.51% | 1,230 |
| Storey | 893 | 81.33% | 174 | 15.85% | 21 | 1.91% | 10 | 0.91% | 719 | 65.48% | 1,098 |
| Washoe | 50,759 | 73.02% | 16,425 | 23.63% | 1,472 | 2.12% | 859 | 1.24% | 34,334 | 40.80% | 69,515 |
| White Pine | 2,087 | 68.61% | 846 | 27.81% | 82 | 2.70% | 27 | 0.89% | 1,241 | 40.80% | 3,042 |
| Totals | 187,268 | 71.92% | 65,081 | 25.00% | 5,471 | 2.10% | 2,555 | 0.98% | 122,187 | 46.93% | 260,375 |

==== Counties that flipped from Republican to Democratic ====
- Churchill
- Douglas
- Elko
- Eureka
- Humboldt
- Lander
- Lincoln
- Lyon
- Pershing
- Washoe
