= John Ensign scandal =

Political scandal in 2009

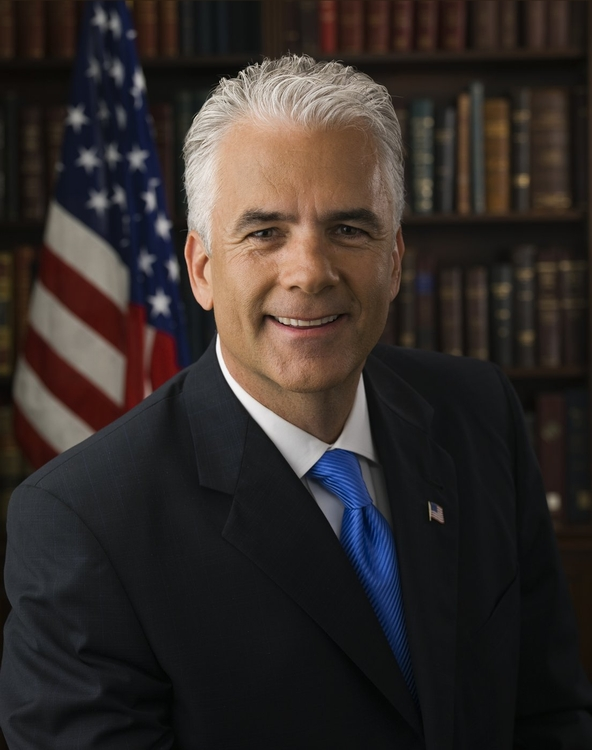
Senator John Ensign (R-NV)

The John Ensign scandal related to revelations in 2009 of an extramarital affair between United States Senator John Ensign from Nevada and campaign aide Cynthia Hampton from 2007 to 2008 and actions taken by Ensign to keep the affair secret. He was investigated for potential violations of federal rules about conflict of interest after he arranged for Doug Hampton, Cynthia's husband and formerly a top staffer in his Washington, D.C. office, to gain a private lobbying job and apparently used his federal position to benefit Hampton's clients.

Ensign resigned from the Senate in 2011 during a Senate Ethics Committee investigation and returned to Las Vegas, Nevada. The committee turned its report over to the Department of Justice for investigation of potential violation of laws. The DOJ found evidence of strong-arm tactics, but decided against prosecution of Ensign, according to internal federal documents released under a FOIA request in late 2014. Doug Hampton was prosecuted and reached a plea deal with the government in May 2012.

== Affair ==
At the time of the affair, Cynthia Hampton worked for Ensign as treasurer of the Senate and Battle Born PAC (a conservative political action committee of which Ensign was the honorary chairman). She and her husband Douglas Hampton were close friends of Ensign and his wife; Doug worked as a top administrative aide in Senator Ensign's Capitol Hill office. When the affair was revealed by Doug Hampton in 2009, an Ensign spokesperson asserted that it had occurred between December 2007 and August 2008, but Hampton said that it began at Christmas 2006.

Neither of the Hamptons worked for Ensign after May 2008. Cynthia Hampton never spoke publicly about the affair. She testified to the Senate Ethics Committee in 2011 in its investigation.

=== Lobbying position for Douglas Hampton ===
In early 2008, Douglas Hampton confronted Ensign about the affair. Ensign contacted political and corporate supporters in Nevada, seeking work for Hampton. Within the next few months, Ensign arranged for Hampton to join a political consulting firm in Nevada and lined up several corporations who had been Ensign campaign donors as lobbying clients for Hampton. Under federal law senior aides such as Hampton are prohibited from lobbying the Senate for a year after leaving their posts. Hampton later said he and Ensign were aware of the lobbying restriction but chose to ignore it. Cynthia Hampton also lost her job with Ensign's PAC in May 2008.

In 2008, after Hampton began working for the political consulting firm, Ensign and his staff repeatedly contacted federal agencies, often after requests from Hampton, on behalf of the companies that were Hampton's clients. In a statement published on October 1, the date that The New York Times reported on Ensign's arrangements for Douglas Hampton, Ensign said: "I am confident we fully complied with the relevant laws and rules governing current and past employees. I have worked on these Nevada issues with these Nevada companies for years, long before Doug Hampton left my office."

=== Financial settlement ===
In April 2008, Ensign's parents gave Cynthia Hampton and her family $96,000. On July 9, 2009, when the payments were reported in the news, Ensign's lawyer, Paul Coggins, issued a statement on Ensign's behalf stating, "The payments were made as gifts, accepted as gifts and complied with tax rules governing gifts." In late 2009, Doug Hampton disputed this interpretation, telling Nightline that it was "crystal clear" that the $96,000 was severance for him for leaving his job as staffer to Ensign and not a gift.

== Public scandal ==
On June 11, 2009, Douglas Hampton sent a letter to Megyn Kelly, a Fox News reporter, in which he said, "The actions of Senator Ensign have ruined our lives and careers and left my family in shambles", and that "I need justice, help and restitution for what Senator Ensign has done to me and my family". The network said it did not receive a mailed letter, but got the letter as an e-mail attachment on June 15.

In a statement on June 16, 2009, Ensign admitted that he had the affair. That day Ensign's wife Darlene issued a statement that said, in part, "Since we found out last year we have worked through the situation and we have come to a reconciliation." On June 17, 2009, Ensign stepped down from his post as chairman of the Republican Policy Committee, the fourth-ranking spot in the Republican Party's leadership.

On June 19, the date that Douglas Hampton's June 11 letter to Fox News was made public, Ensign's office issued a statement, saying "within the past month, Doug Hampton's legal counsel made exorbitant demands for cash and other financial benefits on behalf of his client." The Hamptons' attorney said that the couple was weighing how to respond to the Ensign statement.

=== Sen. Coburn intervenes ===
On July 8, the Las Vegas Sun reported that Douglas Hampton had spoken publicly for the first time about the affair. He said that Ensign and Cynthia Hampton continued the affair, although intermediaries, including Republican Senator Tom Coburn of Oklahoma, tried to persuade the senator to end it. Doug Hampton asserted that Coburn suggested that Ensign help the Hamptons pay off their home and move to Colorado.

According to Douglas Hampton, in a meeting with Ensign arranged by Coburn, "Senator Coburn said, 'What I would do, Doug, if I was you, is I would have them buy your home, give you a million bucks so you can start over, and that is what I am willing to help you negotiate,'" he said. "John said, 'No can do, not going to happen.' [Coburn] volunteered to help. He called me. And he recommended a significant number as one that he would float to the Ensigns."

=== Aftermath ===
According to Politico, Ensign became increasingly isolated after he admitted having an affair, with fellow Republican Senators keeping a distance. Both the Hamptons had been dismissed from their positions with Ensign before the affair was revealed. They later divorced. In September 2010, the Hamptons' home was scheduled for public auction. Douglas Hampton stated that he had been unable to find work since revealing the affair.

In March 2011, Ensign said he would not seek re-election in 2012. He said his decision not to seek re-election was not influenced by the Senate Ethics Committee investigation. "If I was concerned about that, I would resign," he said. In April 2011, three weeks before the committee delivered its findings, Ensign announced that he would resign his seat effective May 3, 2011.

In May 2012, Doug Hampton reached a plea deal with prosecutors, the details of which have not yet been released. In 2014, after the New York Times reported on internal Department of Justice considerations in the decision not to prosecute Ensign, Hampton expressed bitterness that he had lost so much and Ensign had not been punished for his actions.

== Investigations ==
In January 2010, Politico reported that the Federal Bureau of Investigation was investigating possible criminal violations in connection with the affair. It was reported in July 2010 that Senator Tom Coburn had assisted federal authorities in their investigation by turning over e-mails, seen as a sign that the official investigation is gathering steam.

On November 10, 2010, the Federal Election Commission dismissed a complaint against Ensign over the $96,000 payment Ensign's parents made. In December 2010, the Department of Justice dropped its investigation.

=== CREW ===
The progressive watchdog group Citizens for Responsibility and Ethics in Washington (CREW) also asked the Senate to investigate Hampton's charge that Ensign had sexually harassed his wife. Cynthia Hampton has not commented on this. Melanie Sloan, executive director of CREW, said to ABC that if true, the $96,000 unreported severance payoff for Douglas and Cynthia Hampton, Ensign's actions in aiding and abetting Hampton's violation of the one-year lobbying prohibition for ex-Senate staffers, or Ensign sexually harassing Cynthia Hampton, would amount to felonies. The Senate ethics committee and the Department of Justice investigated the lobbying charges and issued subpoenas.

=== Senate Ethics Committee investigation ===
In May 2010, investigators for the United States Senate Select Committee on Ethics spent several days in Las Vegas interviewing witnesses who had knowledge of Ensign's dealings with the Hamptons. In February 2011, it was reported that the Senate ethics committee appointed a special counsel to lead the investigation. Hours later Ensign said that his re-election campaign was increasing its fundraising efforts. According to Politico, senior Nevada Republicans and Republican Senate colleagues privately expressed concern that Ensign could cause them to lose his Senate seat. Senator Coburn was interviewed by the Ethics Committee in early March 2011.

After investigating for twenty-two months, the Senate Ethics Committee concluded in May 2011 there was "substantial and credible evidence" that Ensign broke federal laws in his effort to cover up the extramarital affair. They referred the case to the Department of Justice and Federal Election Commission for further investigation. Their report said that Ensign may have violated laws related to "conspiracy, obstruction of justice and making false statements in attempting to cover up the affair and smooth over its aftermath."

=== Renewed DOJ investigation ===
Sen. Barbara Boxer, chairwoman of the Senate Ethics Committee, told the Senate on May 12, 2011, that the committee's evidence was "substantial enough to warrant the consideration of expulsion" had Ensign not resigned in early May. The Reuters news service reported that, based on the new information contained in the Senate Ethics Investigation, the Justice Department would reopen its investigation of Ensign. In 2012 the Justice Department decided against prosecuting Ensign. According to internal documents released to CREW in 2014 under an FOIA suit and reported by the New York Times, there was intense debate within DOJ about whether to prosecute Ensign; it ultimately decided against it. Details show that Ensign "strong-armed political donors and business associates in 2008 to find lobbying work for Douglas Hampton".
