= Patricia Cafferata =

American politician and lawyer

17th Treasurer of Nevada
- In office January 3, 1983 – January 5, 1987
- Governor: Richard Bryan
- Preceded by: Stan Colton
- Succeeded by: Ken Santor

Personal details
- Born: Patricia Anne Dillon; November 24, 1940 (age 85) Albany, New York, U.S.
- Party: Republican
- Education: Lewis and Clark College (BA); Southwestern University (JD)

Patricia Anne Cafferata (née Dillon; born November 24, 1940) is an American politician and lawyer.

Born in Albany, New York, she graduated from Lewis and Clark College with a degree in elementary education and received her J.D. degree from Southwestern University School of Law. She practiced law in Reno, Nevada. Her mother was Barbara Vucanovich who served in the United States House of Representatives from Nevada and her grandfather was General Thomas Farrell. In 1978, she was elected to the Nevada Assembly as a Republican. Then in 1982, Cafferata was elected Nevada State Treasurer. She served as district attorney in three Nevada counties. She has written several books and articles. Cafferata was the Republican nominee for Governor of Nevada in 1986, losing in a landslide to incumbent Richard Bryan.

Political offices
Preceded by Stan Colton	Treasurer of Nevada; 1983–1987	Succeeded by Ken Santor
Party political offices
Preceded by Robert List	Republican nominee for Governor of Nevada; 1986	Succeeded by Jim Gallaway
