= Jack Carter (politician) =

American politician and businessman (born 1947)

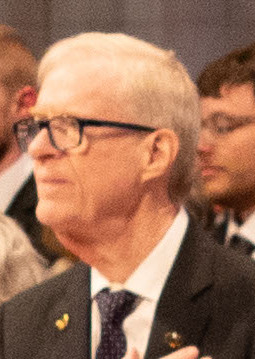
- Carter in 2025
- Born: John William Carter; July 3, 1947 (age 79); Portsmouth, Virginia, U.S.
- Education: Georgia Institute of Technology (BS); University of Georgia (JD)
- Political party: Democratic
- Spouses: Juliet Langford (m. 1971; div. 1989); Elizabeth Brasfield (m. 1992)
- Children: 2, including Jason
- Parents: Jimmy Carter (father); Rosalynn Carter (mother)
- Relatives: Amy Carter (sister); James Earl Carter Sr. (grandfather); Hugh Carter Jr. (second cousin); Rockwell (third cousin); Redfoo (third cousin)
- Military career
- Allegiance: United States
- Branch: United States Navy
- Service years: 1968–1970
- Rank: enlisted
- Conflicts: Vietnam War

John William Carter (born July 3, 1947) is an American businessman, politician and environmentalist. He is the eldest child of former U.S. president Jimmy Carter and First Lady of the United States Rosalynn Carter. A member of the Democratic Party, he was the nominee in the 2006 United States Senate election in Nevada.

== Early life, education and career ==
Carter was born at the Naval Medical Center Portsmouth in Portsmouth, Virginia. Raised in Plains, Georgia, he spent winters working at his father's peanut farm warehouse, where his wages began at 10 cents per hour. Carter struggled when he first entered college in 1965, attending Georgia Institute of Technology, Emory University, and Georgia Southwestern State University. After time in the military, he returned to Georgia Tech, earning a bachelor of science (BS) degree in nuclear physics. Following graduation, Carter immediately entered the University of Georgia School of Law, receiving his Juris Doctor (JD) in 1975.

Carter enlisted in the United States Navy in April 1968 at the suggestion of his father. He served during the Vietnam War, on the salvage ship USS Grapple (ARS-7) and received a general discharge in late 1970 after he and 53 classmates were caught smoking marijuana at the Naval Reactors Facility in Idaho Falls, Idaho.

In 1985, he was interviewed by David Wallechinsky for his book, Midterm Report: The Class of '65: Chronicles Of An American Generation (1986). It was later published as Class Reunion '65, Tales of an American Generation, written from the perspective of two decades post-high school graduation. Twenty-eight then-contemporary high school graduates were interviewed, with Wallechinsky noting the profound impact of the war on Vietnam on their lives.

In 1981, Carter moved to Chicago, where he worked for the Chicago Board of Trade and Citibank.

== Political career ==
=== 2006 senatorial campaign ===
Carter moved to Nevada in 2002 and ran in the 2006 United States Senate election in Nevada. Carter won the Democratic nomination on August 15, 2006, against opponent Ruby Jee Tun, a teacher from Carson City, but lost to Republican incumbent John Ensign.

Carter's primary issues were his opposition to the Iraq War and his concerns about the healthcare system, especially what he characterized as its failure to meet its commitment to veterans.

== Personal life ==
In 1971, Carter married Judy Langford, daughter of former Georgia state senator James Beverly Langford. They had one son, Jason Carter, and one daughter, Sarah Carter. The couple divorced in 1989.

In 1992, Carter married Elizabeth Sawyer Brasfield and is stepfather of two from her first marriage: John Chuldenko, a filmmaker who directed television ads for Carter's Senate campaign, and Sarah Chuldenko, a book illustrator (for Jimmy Carter's poetry volume) and painter who has worked with Jeff Koons. She is married to Australian artist Stephen Reynolds.

Party political offices
Preceded by Edward Bernstein	Democratic nominee for U.S. Senator from Nevada (Class 1); 2006	Succeeded by Shelley Berkley
