= John Ensign =

American veterinarian and politician (born 1958)

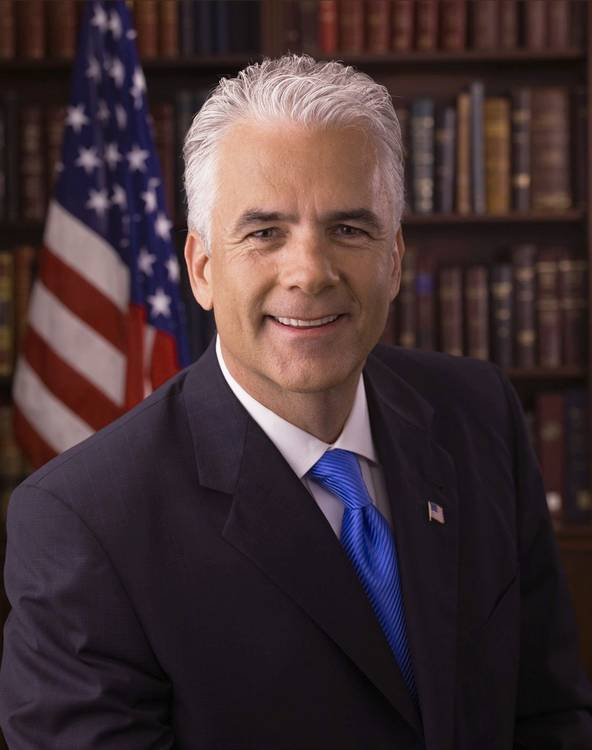
- Official portrait, 2007

Chair of the Senate Republican Policy Committee
- In office January 3, 2009 – June 17, 2009
- Leader: Mitch McConnell
- Preceded by: Kay Bailey Hutchison
- Succeeded by: John Thune

Chair of the National Republican Senatorial Committee
- In office January 3, 2007 – January 3, 2009
- Leader: Mitch McConnell
- Preceded by: Elizabeth Dole
- Succeeded by: John Cornyn

United States Senator from Nevada
- In office January 3, 2001 – May 3, 2011
- Preceded by: Richard Bryan
- Succeeded by: Dean Heller

Member of the U.S. House of Representatives from Nevada's 1st district
- In office January 3, 1995 – January 3, 1999
- Preceded by: James Bilbray
- Succeeded by: Shelley Berkley

Personal details
- Born: John Eric Ensign; March 25, 1958 (age 68) Roseville, California, U.S.
- Party: Republican
- Spouse: Darlene Sciaretta (m. 1987; div. 2019)
- Children: 3
- Education: University of Nevada, Las Vegas (attended); Oregon State University (BS); Colorado State University (DVM)
- Ensign's voice Ensign supporting a joint resolution that disapproves a new National Mediation Board rule. Recorded September 23, 2010

John Eric Ensign (born March 25, 1958) is an American veterinarian and former politician who served as a United States senator from Nevada from 2001 until his resignation in 2011 amid a Senate Ethics Committee investigation into his attempts to hide an extramarital affair. A member of the Republican Party, Ensign previously represented Nevada's 1st congressional district in the House of Representatives from 1995 to 1999, the only Republican to represent the district. Following his resignation from the Senate, Ensign returned to Nevada and resumed his career as a veterinarian.

== Early life, education, and veterinary career ==
Ensign was born in 1958 in Roseville, California, to Sharon Lee Cipriani (whose father was Italian) and a father whose surname was Mueller. Ensign's parents, married too young, separated when Ensign was four years of age; Ensign then moved with Cipriani to Nevada. Cipriani later married Michael S. Ensign, a gaming industry executive; he formally adopted young John, who considers him his "real father." The senior Ensign later became chairman of the board of directors of Mandalay Resort Group.

Ensign attended the University of Nevada, Las Vegas, becoming a member of the Sigma Chi fraternity. He graduated from Oregon State University with a Bachelor of Science degree in 1981. He received his Doctor of Veterinary Medicine degree from Colorado State University in 1985 and entered veterinary practice soon after. Ensign became a successful businessman, opening a 24-hour animal hospital in Las Vegas. He owned two animal hospitals before entering politics.

In political campaigns, Ensign frequently referred to his ancestry, noting that he is one-eighth (1/8) Filipino. As of 2008, Ensign had never met his Philippine-born paternal grandfather, who is of Filipino-German ancestry. Ensign did not learn of this grandfather's ancestry until about 1994. The Senator was conferred the Order of the Knights of Rizal with the rank of Knight Grand Cross of Rizal by Filipino dignitaries in 1997.

After resigning from the U.S. Senate in 2011, Ensign returned to Las Vegas with his family. Ensign then renewed his practice as a veterinarian and opened Boca Park Animal Hospital.

== Political career ==
=== U.S. House of Representatives ===
In 1994, Ensign won the Republican nomination for Nevada's 1st congressional district, based in Las Vegas. He trailed four-term incumbent Democrat James Bilbray by a wide margin for most of the campaign. However, Ensign gained considerable momentum after reports surfaced that a Bilbray aide stood to make a huge profit from lands legislation sponsored by Bilbray. Ensign won the election by 1,400 votes and was reelected in 1996 by seven points, although Democratic presidential candidate Bill Clinton carried the district by a large margin that year.

=== U.S. Senate ===
In 1998, Ensign ran for the Senate but was defeated by the Democratic incumbent, future Senate Majority Leader Harry Reid, by 401 votes.

Ensign won a Senate seat on his second try in 2000, defeating Democratic opponent Ed Bernstein by a 55%–40% margin, to succeed the retiring Democratic incumbent, Richard H. Bryan. Ensign was reelected in 2006; he defeated businessman Jack Carter.

Ensign and Reid developed a fairly good relationship, despite their bruising 1998 contest. They frequently worked together on Nevada issues.

In April 2009, Ensign was planning a June 1 trip to Iowa, the first in his career, causing speculation that he was mulling a presidential campaign in 2012. Given the disclosure of his extramarital affair and cover-up in mid-June of that year, his presidential aspirations were put in limbo. Ensign resigned his position as chair of the Senate Republican Policy Committee on June 17, 2009, in the wake of a Senate Ethics Committee investigation. On July 14, 2009, Ensign announced his plan to run for re-election to his Nevada Senate seat in 2012, even though his polling numbers had recently decreased.

For Sharron Angle's debate with Harry Reid on October 14, 2010, Ensign played Reid during one day of her debate preparation at the Trump Plaza in Las Vegas. The Las Vegas Sun speculated in November 2010 that this might hurt his relationship with Reid, who could "man up" and oppose Ensign's re-election. The Las Vegas Review-Journal noted in November 2010 that Ensign had multiple "hurdles" to re-election.

==== Chairmanship of National Republican Senatorial Committee ====
Ensign was elected Chairman of the National Republican Senatorial Committee (NRSC). As chairman of the NRSC, Ensign was charged with assembling a staff to win back the U.S. Senate for Republicans in the 2008 elections. Ensign chose Mike Slanker and Lindsey Slanker of Nevada-based political consulting firm November Inc. to be the Political Director and Finance Director of the NRSC. In the 2008 elections, Democrats gained 8 seats, and after the party switch of Arlen Specter in 2009, the Democrats gained a filibuster-proof majority in the Senate.

==== Electronic fund-raising reports ====
In September 2007, it was discovered that Ensign had used the secret hold rule to prevent a bill requiring senators to file fund-raising reports electronically from being voted on. He required that they first vote on his amendment to strengthen disclosure rules. (The "secret hold" is a parliamentary procedure within the Standing Rules of the Senate that allows one or more Senators to prevent a motion from reaching a vote on the Senate floor.) Ensign insisted that, before a vote on the disclosure bill could be held, the committee would first vote on an amendment that "would force groups petitioning the Senate Ethics Committee to disclose the identity of donors giving more than $5,000", which watchdog groups charged was intended to prevent passage of the bill.

==== 2006 re-election campaign ====
Ensign faced Democrat Jack Carter, son of former President Jimmy Carter, in the November general election. Both he and Carter defeated token opposition in their August 15, 2006 primaries. Ensign defeated Carter in the general election on November 7, 2006, 55.36% to 40.99%.

==== Resignation ====
On March 7, 2011, in the midst of a Senate Ethics Committee investigation, Ensign said he would not seek re-election in 2012 because he wanted to spare his family from an "exceptionally ugly" campaign. "At this point in my life, I have to put my family first," Ensign told reporters at a news conference in Las Vegas. The announcement was welcomed by national Republicans, who suggested he would not have survived a primary election. The Senate Ethics Committee conducted a 22-month investigation of Ensign's activities. Before they released their report, on April 21, 2011, Ensign announced his resignation from office effective May 3. He said that he "will not continue to subject my family, my constituents, or the Senate to any further rounds of investigation, depositions, drawn out proceedings, or especially public hearings." The Committee gave its report to the Department of Justice for investigation of alleged serious violations of law.

Ensign became the first United States Senator from Nevada to resign, besides Alan Bible, who resigned seventeen days before the end of his term to give his successor an advantage in seniority.

==== Senate committee assignments ====
- Committee on the Budget
- Committee on Commerce, Science and Transportation
  - Subcommittee on Aviation Operations, Safety, and Security
  - Subcommittee on Communications, Technology, and the Internet (Ranking Member)
  - Subcommittee on Surface Transportation and Merchant Marine Infrastructure, Safety, and Security
- Committee on Finance
  - Subcommittee on Health Care
  - Subcommittee on Taxation, IRS Oversight, and Long-Term Growth
  - Subcommittee on Social Security, Pensions and Family Policy
- Committee on Homeland Security and Governmental Affairs

=== Political positions ===
==== Abortion ====
The National Right to Life Committee and NARAL Pro-Choice America certify his anti-abortion voting record. Ensign authored the Child Custody Protection Act in 2003, which prohibits taking minors across State lines to circumvent laws in certain jurisdictions that require parents to be involved in abortion decisions by minors.

==== Animal advocacy ====
Ensign was considered one of the Humane Society's biggest allies in Congress. Along with Senators Maria Cantwell (D-WA), Arlen Specter (D-PA) and Dianne Feinstein (D-CA), Senator Ensign—a veterinarian—was a lead sponsor of the Animal Fighting Prohibition Enforcement Act, which transformed into a felony the transport of animals across state lines for the purpose of fighting. According to a press release from Ensign's office, "Fifty states currently have laws against dog fighting and forty-nine have laws against cockfighting. This bill complements these state laws."

==== Cuba ====
Senator Ensign was a member of the Congressional Cuba Democracy Caucus.

==== "Don't Ask, Don't Tell" policy ====
On December 18, 2010, Ensign voted in favor of the Don't Ask, Don't Tell Repeal Act of 2010 to allow gay and lesbian people to serve openly in the armed forces.

==== Eminent domain ====
Ensign had been a leading voice against the Kelo v. New London Supreme Court ruling, and introduced a bill that would blunt the effects of the ruling. In Kelo, the Court ruled that local governments could use eminent domain not just for public use but for any project that involves a public purpose. Specifically, the Court permitted the City of New London, Connecticut, to force a homeowner to sell her home for new development. The decision that eminent domain could be used to issue a condemnation order on a property for a private purpose caused a backlash.

==== Fiscal issues ====
The conservative fiscal watchdog group Citizens Against Government Waste awarded Ensign a 92% lifetime rating—the fourth highest Senator after Jim DeMint, Tom Coburn and Jon Kyl—as of 2007.

In 2005, Ensign introduced legislation to the Commission on the Accountability and Review of Federal Agencies. The commission would compile a list of what its members consider unnecessary, outdated, wasteful, or duplicative discretionary programs, and require Congress to vote up-or-down to eliminate all programs on the list. The proposal was similar to the process Congress uses for Base Realignment and Closure to assess military bases. It was not passed.

==== Health care reform ====
Ensign opposed President Barack Obama's health reform legislation; he voted against the Patient Protection and Affordable Care Act in December 2009, and he voted against the Health Care and Education Reconciliation Act of 2010.

==== Marriage ====
In 1998, after President Bill Clinton admitted to having committed adultery with Monica Lewinsky, Ensign called on him to resign. Ensign said, "He has no credibility left."

In 2004, Ensign spoke on the Senate floor in favor of the proposed Federal Marriage Amendment, which would have barred states from recognizing same-sex marriage. Ensign said:

Marriage is the cornerstone on which our society was founded. For those who say that the Constitution is so sacred that we cannot or should not adopt the Federal Marriage Amendment, I would simply point out that marriage, and the sanctity of that institution, predates the American Constitution and the founding of our nation.

==== Prison reform ====
In 2011, Ensign introduced legislation that would have required all low-security prisoners to work 50 hours per week.

==== Veterans ====
In April 2008 Ensign voted against a measure to expand federal benefits to Filipino veterans in the Philippines, then a U.S. Commonwealth, against Japan during World War II. He said he thought benefits should be used for veterans in the United States. The measure passed Congress.

==== Wars in Afghanistan and Iraq ====
Ensign voted in support of authorizing the President to use the United States Armed Forces to "deter and prevent acts of international terrorism against the United States." This is the authorizing legislation for the invasion of Afghanistan and removing the Taliban from power.

Ensign also voted in support of the President to use the United States Armed Forces "as he determines to be necessary and appropriate" in order to "defend the national security of the United States against the continuing threat posed by Iraq; and enforce all relevant United Nations Security Council Resolutions regarding Iraq." Ensign supported the counterinsurgency policy in Iraq in 2007 and opposed withdrawing troops from Iraq in 2007 and 2008.

== Personal life ==
When he was a student at Colorado State, Ensign became a born-again Christian. He and his now ex-wife, Darlene, were active in the Promise Keepers, an evangelical group. John and Darlene Ensign have three children.

Ensign is a member of the Pentecostal International Church of the Foursquare Gospel. As of 2000, Ensign attended a Foursquare church when he was in Las Vegas. He has been a member of the religious and political organization The Fellowship, described by evangelical Christians as one of the most politically well-connected fundamentalist organizations in the United States. During Ensign's Senate tenure, he was the only Pentecostal in the Senate. While working in Washington, DC, he resided at the C Street Center, a religious house in the capital. Ensign moved out of the C Street house in November 2009, after disclosure of an extramarital affair and reports that he influenced others to keep quiet about his affair.

In 2019, John and Darlene Ensign were reported to have divorced after 31 years of marriage.

=== Affair and corruption scandal ===
Between 2007 and 2008, Senator Ensign had an affair with Cynthia Hampton, who worked for a PAC supporting his campaigns. Her husband, Doug Hampton, was a close friend of Ensign and worked as a top administrative staffer in his Washington, DC office. Sen. Tom Coburn, with Timothy and David Coe, leaders of The Fellowship, attempted to intervene to end Ensign's affair in February 2008 by convincing Ensign to write a letter to Cynthia Hampton breaking off the affair. Ensign was chaperoned by Coburn and other members from C Street, where Ensign lived with Coburn, to a FedEx office to post the letter. Ensign called Cynthia Hampton hours later to tell her to ignore the letter and then flew out to spend the weekend with her in Nevada.

The disclosure of the affair—together with Ensign's efforts to keep it quiet, including finding work for Doug Hampton as a lobbyist—resulted in investigations by the Federal Bureau of Investigation, the Federal Election Commission, and the Senate. The alleged misconduct included a $96,000 payment from Ensign's parents, which Doug Hampton claimed was an unreported severance payment; Doug Hampton obtaining a job as a lobbyist at Ensign's behest; Ensign helping Doug Hampton in his role as a lobbyist in violation of a one-year lobbying ban on ex-Senate staffers; and Hampton's additional charge that Ensign sexually harassed his wife.

On March 7, 2011, Ensign announced that he would not seek re-election to the Senate the following year because he wished to shield his family from the consequences of his past behavior. In late April 2011, Ensign announced that he would resign his position as Senator on May 3. In May 2011, the Senate Ethics Committee referred its report to the Department of Justice for investigation of possible violations of law. The Department of Justice stated that it found evidence of potential criminality, but that it had decided against prosecuting Ensign.

== Electoral history ==
Nevada's 1st congressional district: Results 1994–1996
Year	Democrat	Votes	Pct	Republican	Votes	Pct	3rd Party	Party	Votes	Pct	3rd Party	Party	Votes	Pct	3rd Party	Party	Votes	Pct
1994	James Bilbray	72,333	48%	John Ensign	73,769	48%	Gary Wood	Libertarian	6,065	4%								
1996	Bob Coffin	75,081	44%	John Ensign (incumbent)	86,472	50%	Ted Gunderson	Independent American	4,572	3%	James Dan	Libertarian	3,341	2%	Richard Eidson	Natural Law	3,127	2%

Senate elections in Nevada: Results 1998–2006
Year	Democrat	Votes	Pct	Republican	Votes	Pct	3rd Party	Party	Votes	Pct	3rd Party	Party	Votes	Pct	3rd Party	Votes	Pct	
1998	Harry Reid (incumbent)	208,621	48%	John Ensign	208,220	48%	Michael Cloud	Libertarian	8,129	2%	Michael E. Williams	Natural Law	2,781	1%	None of these	8,113	2%	
2000	Edward M. Bernstein	238,260	40%	John Ensign	330,687	55%	Kathryn Rusco	Green	10,286	2%	J. J. Johnson	Libertarian	5,395	1%	None of these	11,503	2%	(Note: Write-in and minor candidate notes: In 2000, Independent American candidate Ernie Berghof received 2,540 votes; Citizens First candidate Bill Grutzmacher received 1,579 votes; No Vote Cast received 457 votes; and Over Vote received 69 votes.)
2006	Jack Carter	238,796	41%	John Ensign (incumbent)	322,501	55%	David K. Schumann	Independent American	7,774	1%	Brendan Trainor	Libertarian	5,269	1%	None of these	8,232	1%	

== See also ==
- List of federal political sex scandals in the United States
- List of federal political scandals in the United States
- List of Asian Americans and Pacific Islands Americans in the United States Congress
- List of United States senators expelled or censured

== Notes ==
U.S. House of Representatives
Preceded by James Bilbray	Member of the U.S. House of Representatives from Nevada's 1st congressional district 1995–1999	Succeeded by Shelley Berkley
Party political offices
Preceded by Demar Dahl	Republican nominee for U.S. Senator from Nevada (Class 3); 1998	Succeeded by Richard Ziser
Preceded by Hal Furman	Republican nominee for U.S. Senator from Nevada (Class 1); 2000, 2006	Succeeded by Dean Heller
Preceded by Elizabeth Dole	Chair of the National Republican Senatorial Committee; 2007–2009	Succeeded by John Cornyn
Preceded by Kay Bailey Hutchison	Chair of the Senate Republican Policy Committee; 2009	Succeeded by John Thune
U.S. Senate
Preceded by Richard Bryan	U.S. Senator (Class 3) from Nevada; 2001–2011; Served alongside: Harry Reid	Succeeded by Dean Heller
U.S. order of precedence (ceremonial)
Preceded by Al Franken as Former U.S. Senator	Order of precedence of the United States	Succeeded by Dean Heller as Former U.S. Senator
