= 1982 United States Senate election in Nevada =

- November 2, 1982
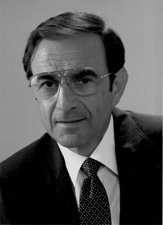

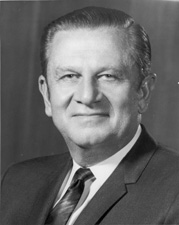
| Nominee | Chic Hecht | Howard Cannon |
| Party | Republican | Democratic |
| Popular vote | 120,377 | 114,720 |
| Percentage | 50.07% | 47.72% |
- County results Hecht: 40–50% 50–60% 60–70% Cannon: 50–60%
U.S. senator before election
Howard Cannon
Democratic
Elected U.S. Senator
Chic Hecht
Republican

The 1982 United States Senate election in Nevada was held on November 2, 1982. Incumbent Democratic U.S. Senator Howard Cannon ran for re-election to a fifth term, but narrowly lost to Republican Chic Hecht.

== Major candidates ==
=== Democratic ===
- Howard Cannon, incumbent U.S. Senator
- James David Santini, U.S. Representative

=== Republican ===
- Chic Hecht, State Senator since 1967

== Results ==
General election results
| Party | Candidate | Votes | % |
|---|---|---|---|
| Republican | Chic Hecht | 120,377 | 50.07% |
| Democratic | Howard Cannon (incumbent) | 114,720 | 47.72% |
| None of These Candidates | – | 5,297 | 2.20% |
| Republican gain from Democratic | | | |

== See also ==
- 1982 United States Senate elections
