= 2006 United States Senate election in Nevada =

- November 7, 2006
- Turnout: 58.8% (voting eligible)
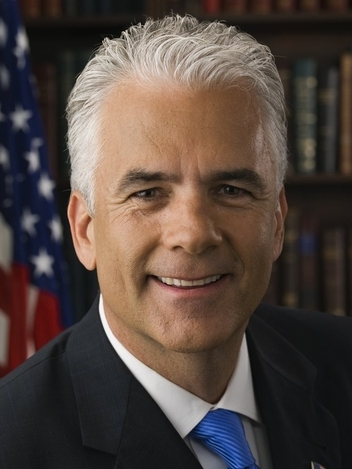

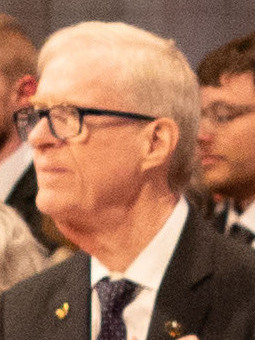
Nominee	John Ensign	Jack Carter
Party	Republican	Democratic
Popular vote	322,501	238,796
Percentage	55.36%	40.99%
- County results Ensign: 50–60% 60–70% 70–80%
U.S. senator before election
John Ensign
Republican
Elected U.S. Senator
John Ensign
Republican

The 2006 United States Senate election in Nevada was held on November 7, 2006. Incumbent Republican John Ensign defeated Democratic nominee Jack Carter to win re-election to a second term. This was the only U.S. Senate election in Nevada where the incumbent Republican Senator was re-elected since 1980 and the only election for this seat where the incumbent Republican Senator was re-elected since 1952.

== Republican primary ==
=== Candidates ===
==== Nominee ====
- John Ensign, incumbent U.S. Senator

==== Defeated in primary ====
- Ed Hamilton, businessman

=== Results ===
Republican primary results
Party	Candidate	Votes	%
Republican	John Ensign (incumbent)	127,023	90.47
Republican	None of these candidates	6,754	4.81
Republican	Ed Hamilton	6,629	4.72
Total votes		140,406	100.00

== Democratic primary ==
Popular Las Vegas mayor Oscar Goodman had said in January 2006 that he would probably run, but decisively ruled out a run in late April. Going into the 2006 cycle, many top Nevada Democrats such as State Assembly speaker Richard Perkins indicated that the party would put more efforts into the gubernatorial election than into defeating Ensign.

=== Candidates ===
==== Nominee ====
- Jack Carter, U.S Navy veteran and son of former President Jimmy Carter

==== Defeated in primary ====
- Ruby Jee Tun, middle school science teacher

==== Declined ====
- Oscar Goodman, Mayor of Las Vegas
- Frankie Sue Del Papa, Attorney General of Nevada
- Dina Titus, member of the Nevada Senate (ran for Governor)

=== Results ===
Democratic primary vote
Party	Candidate	Votes	%
Democratic	Jack Carter	92,270	78.30
Democratic	None of these candidates	14,425	12.24
Democratic	Ruby Jee Tun	11,147	9.46
Total votes		117,842	100.00

== General election ==
=== Candidates ===
- Jack Carter (D), Navy veteran and son of former President Jimmy Carter
- John Ensign (R), incumbent U.S. Senator
- David Schumann (I), retired financial analyst, 2004 nominee, and 2002 state senator nominee
- Brendan Trainor (L), state party chair, airline quality manager, and frequent candidate

=== Campaign ===
Carter's advantages included his formidable speaking abilities and kinship with a former U.S. president. On the other hand, Ensign was also considered to be an effective speaker and as of the first quarter of 2006, held an approximately 5–1 advantage over Carter in cash-on-hand.

=== Endorsements ===
Jack Carter (D)

Individuals

- Wesley Clark, General, 2004 democratic presidential candidate

=== Debates ===
- Complete video of debate, October 15, 2006

=== Polling ===
Poll source	Date(s) administered	Sample size (Note: Key: A – all adults RV – registered voters LV – likely voters V – unclear)	Margin of error	John Ensign(R)	Jack Carter (D)	Others	Undecided
Mason-Dixon (Las Vegas Review-Journal)	October 21–24, 2005	625 (RV)	±4.0%	59%	25%	–	16%
Zogby International (Wall Street Journal)	October 25–31, 2005	?	±4.5%	48%	33%	–	19%
Zogby International (Wall Street Journal)	December 1–6, 2005	?	±4.3%	52%	34%	–	14%
Rasmussen Reports	January 23, 2006	?	±4.5%	53%	34%	7%	6%
Hart Research (D)	March 2–13, 2006	?	±3.1%	49%	32%	–	19%
Zogby International (Wall Street Journal)	March 22–27, 2006	?	±4.3%	52%	38%	–	11%
Mason-Dixon (Las Vegas Review-Journal)	April 3–5, 2006	625 (RV)	±4.0%	60%	27%	–	13%
Research 2000 (Reno Gazette-Journal/News 4)	May 12–15, 2006	?	±4.0%	52%	32%	–	16%
Zogby International (Wall Street Journal)	June 13–19, 2006	?	±4.1%	51%	36%	–	13%
Zogby International (Wall Street Journal)	July 11–19, 2006	?	±4.3%	50%	35%	–	15%
Rasmussen Reports	July 31, 2006	500 (LV)	±4.5%	46%	39%	4%	11%
Mason-Dixon (Las Vegas Review-Journal)	August 7–10, 2006	625 (RV)	±4.0%	54%	33%	–	13%
Zogby International (Wall Street Journal)	August 15–21, 2006	?	±4.3%	48%	45%	–	7%
Zogby International (Wall Street Journal)	August 29–September 5, 2006	?	±4.4%	52%	40%	–	8%
Research 2000 (Reno Gazette-Journal)	September 5–7, 2006	600 (LV)	±4.0%	56%	35%	–	9%
Rasmussen Reports	September 6, 2006	500 (LV)	±4.5%	50%	41%	3%	6%
Zogby International (Wall Street Journal)	September 19–25, 2006	?	±4.2%	49%	42%	–	9%
Mason-Dixon (Las Vegas Review-Journal)	September 19–26, 2006	625 (RV)	±4.0%	58%	35%	1%	6%
Zogby International (Wall Street Journal)	October 10–16, 2006	547 (LV)	±4.2%	52%	43%	–	5%
Rasmussen Reports	October 17, 2006	500 (LV)	±4.5%	50%	42%	–	8%
Research 2000 (Reno Gazette-Journal)	October 23–25, 2006	600 (LV)	±4.0%	55%	41%	–	4%
Zogby International (Wall Street Journal)	October 23–27, 2006	?	±4.4%	58%	37%	–	5%
Mason-Dixon (Las Vegas Review-Journal)	October 26–30, 2006	?	±4.0%	54%	37%	–	9%

=== Predictions ===
Source	Ranking	As of
The Cook Political Report	Solid R	November 6, 2006
Sabato's Crystal Ball	Safe R	November 6, 2006
Rothenberg Political Report	Safe R	November 6, 2006
Real Clear Politics	Safe R	November 6, 2006

=== Results ===
General election results
Party	Candidate	Votes	%	±%
Republican	John Ensign (incumbent)	322,501	55.36	+0.27
Democratic	Jack Carter	238,796	40.99	+1.30
None of These Candidates		8,232	1.41	–0.50
Independent American	David K. Schumann	7,774	1.33	+0.91
Libertarian	Brendan Trainor	5,269	0.90	+0.01
Majority		83,705	14.37	–1.03
Turnout		582,572	58.78	–9.87
Republican hold		Swing	–0.5	

==== By county ====
County	John Ensign Republican		Jack Carter Democratic		Various candidates Other parties		Margin		Total
County	#	%	#	%	#	%	#	%	Total
Carson City	11,002	60.6%	6,461	35.6%	702	3.8%	4,541	25.0%	18,165
Churchill	5,777	71.3%	2,000	24.7%	327	4.0%	3,777	46.6%	8,104
Clark	188,847	52.5%	159,214	44.2%	11,979	3.3%	29,633	8.3%	360,040
Douglas	12,822	66.3%	5,795	30.0%	716	3.7%	7,027	33.3%	19,333
Elko	8,218	69.6%	2,941	24.9%	652	5.5%	5,277	44.7%	11,811
Esmeralda	289	66.9%	91	21.1%	52	12.0%	198	45.8%	432
Eureka	510	70.8%	128	17.8%	82	11.5%	382	53.0%	720
Humboldt	3,145	70.0%	1,129	25.1%	216	4.8%	2,016	44.9%	4,490
Lander	1,252	70.1%	450	25.2%	83	4.6%	802	44.9%	1,785
Lincoln	1,323	71.4%	415	22.4%	115	6.2%	908	49.0%	1,853
Lyon	9,876	65.5%	4,522	30.0%	669	4.4%	5,354	35.5%	15,067
Mineral	1,237	58.9%	728	34.7%	135	6.5%	509	24.2%	2,100
Nye	6,855	57.9%	4,294	36.3%	688	5.8%	2,561	21.6%	11,837
Pershing	983	63.9%	462	30.0%	93	6.0%	521	33.9%	1,538
Storey	1,151	61.2%	635	33.8%	94	5.0%	516	27.4%	1,880
Washoe	67,262	56.0%	48,385	40.3%	4,440	3.7%	18,877	15.7%	120,087
White Pine	1,952	58.6%	1,146	34.4%	232	6.9%	806	24.2%	3,330
Totals	322,501	55.4%	238,796	41.0%	21,275	3.7%	83,705	14.4%	582,572

== See also ==
- 2006 United States Senate elections

== Notes ==
Official campaign websites
- John Ensign (R) for Senate
- Jack Carter (D) for Senate
- Brendan Trainor (L) for Senate
