= Robert List =

American attorney and politician

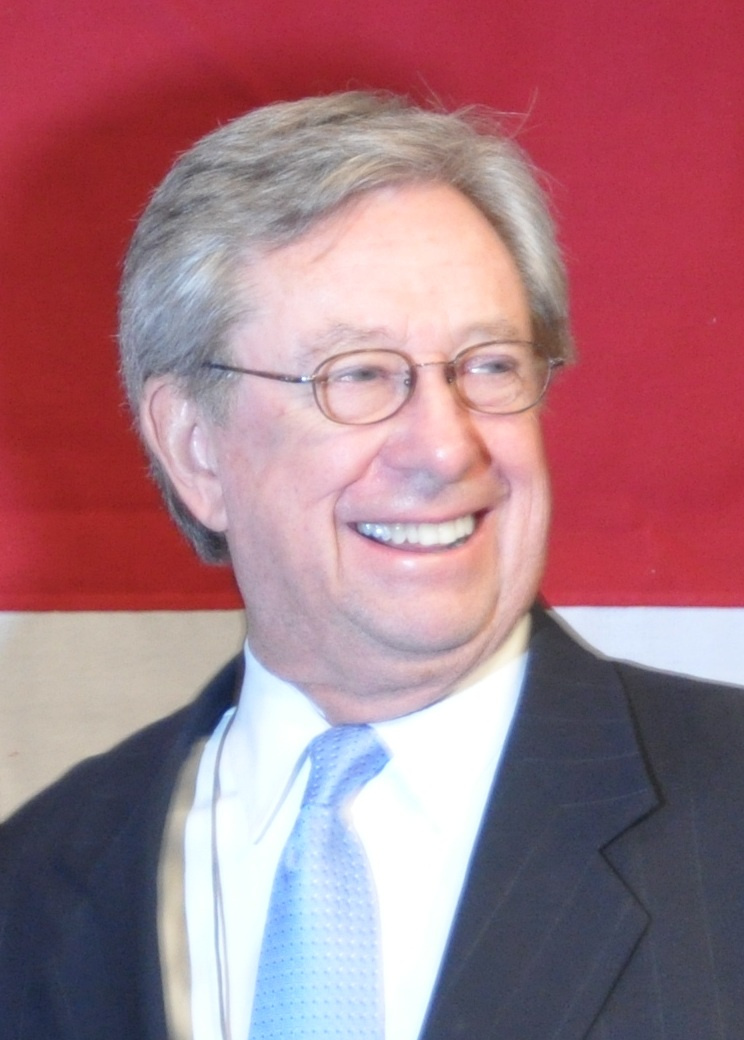

24th Governor of Nevada
- In office January 1, 1979 – January 3, 1983
- Lieutenant: Myron E. Leavitt
- Preceded by: Mike O'Callaghan
- Succeeded by: Richard Bryan

26th Attorney General of Nevada
- In office January 4, 1971 – January 1, 1979
- Governor: Mike O'Callaghan
- Preceded by: Harvey Dickerson
- Succeeded by: Richard Bryan

Personal details
- Born: Robert Frank List; September 1, 1936 (age 90) Visalia, California, U.S.
- Party: Republican (1970–present)
- Spouse: Polly Minor (m. 1991)
- Children: 5
- Education: Utah State University (BA); University of California, Hastings (JD)

Robert Frank List (born September 1, 1936) is an American attorney and politician. A member of the Republican Party, he served as the 24th governor of Nevada from 1979 to 1983, as Nevada Attorney General from 1971 to 1979, and as Carson City District Attorney from 1967 to 1971. Currently List practices law in Las Vegas with the law firm Kolesar & Leatham, Chtd. After his term ended, he became a supporter of the Yucca Mountain nuclear waste repository. List was defeated for re-election in 1982 by Nevada Attorney General Richard Bryan. He was the last Governor of Nevada to lose reelection until Democrat Steve Sisolak lost reelection to Republican Joe Lombardo in 2022. (Note: He would also be the last Republican Governor of Nevada to lose reelection until 2026)

== Childhood ==
Robert Frank List was born in Exeter, California, to Frank and Alice List.

== Education ==
List received his J.D. and LL.D. degrees from the University of California, Hastings College of the Law in 1962. He is licensed with the State Bar of Nevada, District of Columbia Bar, and U.S. Supreme Court. He is a member of the American Bar Association, Nevada State Bar Association, Society of Attorneys General Emeritus and Past Governors' Association.

== Current practice ==
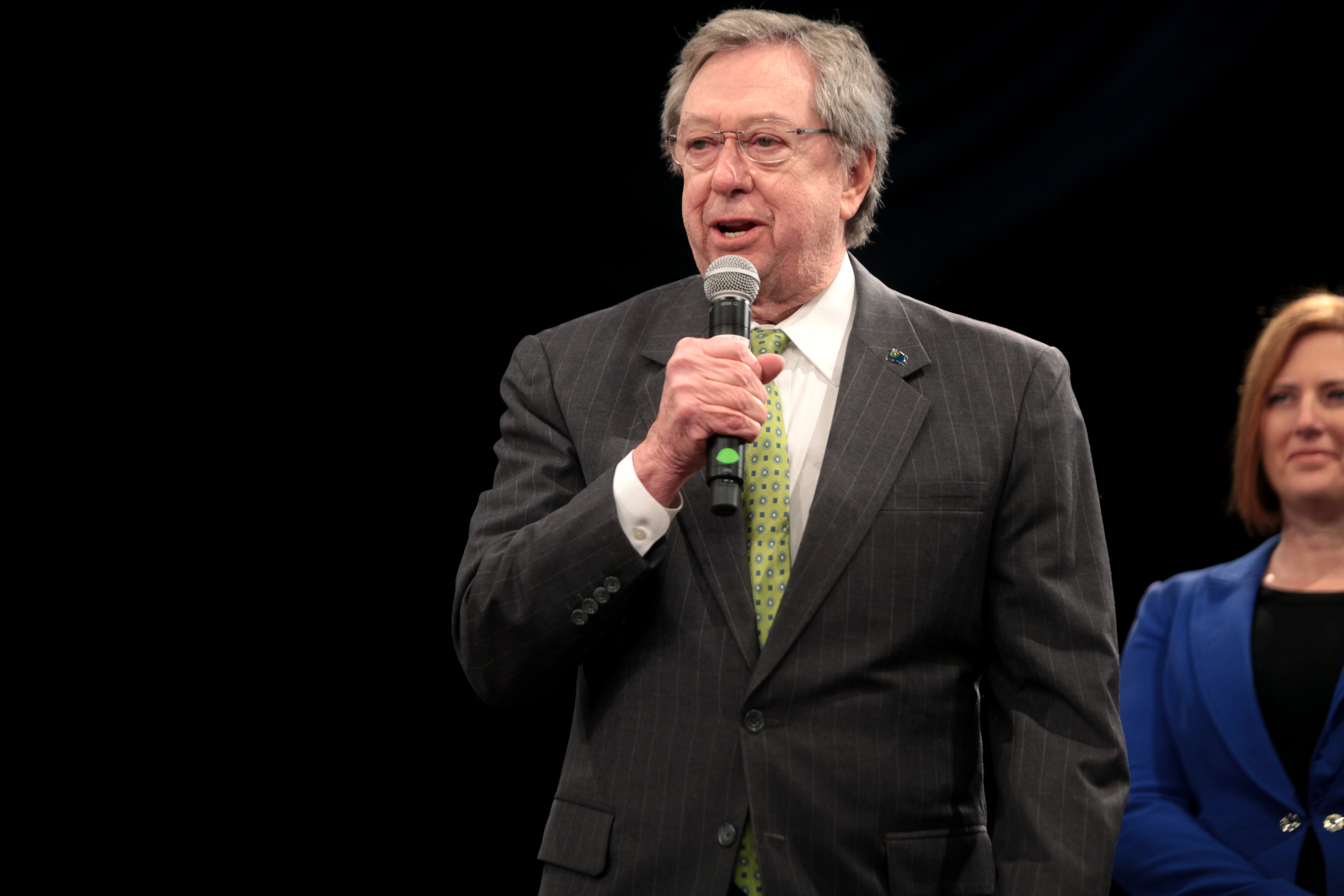
List in 2016

On December 1, 2010, List joined Kolesar & Leatham, Chtd., a Las Vegas business law firm, as a senior partner. He is also the chief executive officer of The Robert List Company, a lobbying firm.

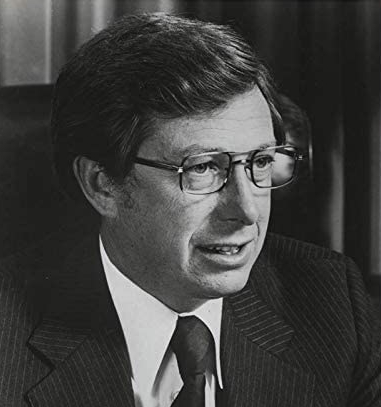
List as governor.

List served as Carson City, Nevada District Attorney from 1966 to 1970 and Attorney General of Nevada from 1970 to 1978. In 1978, he was elected Governor, serving in that capacity until 1983. He served as Chairman of both the Western Governors Association and the Conference of Western Attorneys General.

== Personal life ==
He is married to Mary Ann (Polly) Minor List and they have two children, Robert and Elizabeth. He also has three adult children; Suzanne, Hank, and Michelle.

== Notes ==
Legal offices
Preceded by Harvey Dickerson	Attorney General of Nevada; 1971–1979	Succeeded by Richard Bryan
Political offices
Preceded by Mike O'Callaghan	Governor of Nevada; 1979–1983	Succeeded by Richard Bryan
Party political offices
Preceded by Shirley Crumpler	Republican nominee for Governor of Nevada; 1978, 1982	Succeeded by Patricia Dillon Cafferata
U.S. order of precedence (ceremonial)
Preceded by Martha McSally as Former U.S. Senator	Order of precedence of the United States; Within Nevada	Succeeded by Bob Miller as Former Governor
Preceded by Earl Ray Tomblin as Former Governor	Order of precedence of the United States; Outside Nevada	Succeeded by Bob Miller as Former Governor
