= 1982 Nevada gubernatorial election =

- November 2, 1982
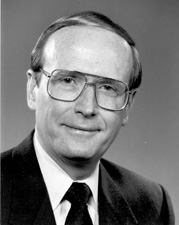

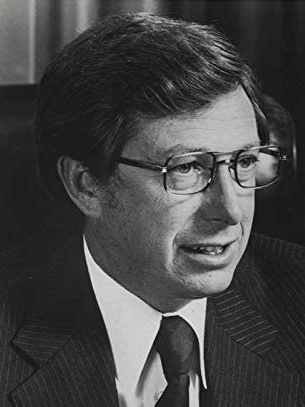
Nominee	Richard Bryan	Robert List
Party	Democratic	Republican
Popular vote	128,132	100,104
Percentage	53.44%	41.75%
- County results Bryan: 40–50% 50–60% 60–70% List: 40–50% 50–60%
Governor before election
Robert List
Republican
Elected Governor
Richard Bryan
Democratic

The 1982 Nevada gubernatorial election took place on November 2, 1982, to elect the Governor of Nevada. Incumbent Republican Robert List ran unsuccessfully for re-election to a second term. He lost to Democratic nominee Richard Bryan by 11.7%.

This was the most recent election in which Nevada's incumbent governor lost re-election until Democrat Steve Sisolak's defeat in 2022, and would be the last election until 2026, in which an incumbent Republican lost reelection to a Democratic candidate.

== Republican primary ==
=== Candidates ===
- Robert List, incumbent governor of Nevada
- Michael Moody, U.S. Army veteran
- Edward E. "Ned" Eyre Jr.

=== Results ===
Republican Primary results
Party	Candidate	Votes	%
Republican	Robert List (incumbent)	39,319	57.00%
Republican	Michael Moody	13,849	20.08%
	None of These Candidates	13,252	19.21%
Republican	Edward "Ned" Eyre Jr.	2,566	3.72%
Total votes		68,986	100.00%

== Democratic primary ==
=== Candidates ===
- Richard Bryan, state attorney general
- Myron E. Leavitt, incumbent Lieutenant Governor of Nevada
- Stan Colton, state treasurer
- June Carr
- Cher Volin
- Carl Hunt

=== Results ===
Democratic primary results
Party	Candidate	Votes	%
Democratic	Richard Bryan	55,262	51.06%
Democratic	Myron E. Leavitt	34,783	32.14%
Democratic	Stan Colton	10,830	10.01%
	None of These Candidates	4,418	4.08%
Democratic	June Carr	1,771	1.14%
Democratic	Cher Volin	621	0.57%
Democratic	Carl Hunt	557	0.51%
Total votes		108,242	100.00%

== General election ==
=== Candidates ===
- Richard Bryan (D), state attorney general
- Robert List (R), incumbent governor of Nevada
- Dan Becan (L)

=== Results ===
Nevada gubernatorial election, 1982
Party	Candidate	Votes	%	±%
Democratic	Richard Bryan	128,132	53.44%	+13.76%
Republican	Robert List (incumbent)	100,104	41.75%	−14.42%
	None of These Candidates	6,894	2.88%	+1.20%
Libertarian	Dan Becan	4,621	1.93%	+1.15%
Majority		28,028	11.69%	
Total votes		239,751	100.00%	
Democratic gain from Republican		Swing	+28.18%	

=== County results ===
County	Richard Bryan Democratic		Robert List Republican		None of These Candidates		Dan Becan Libertarian		Margin		Total votes cast
County	#	%	#	%	#	%	#	%	#	%	Total votes cast
Carson City	5,854	47.86%	5,592	45.72%	492	4.02%	294	2.40%	262	2.14%	12,232
Churchill	1,897	37.70%	2,944	58.51%	122	2.42%	69	1.37%	-1,047	-20.81%	5,032
Clark	75,456	60.31%	44,667	35.70%	3,053	2.44%	1,946	1.56%	30,789	24.61%	125,122
Douglas	2,650	37.25%	4,079	57.34%	209	2.94%	176	2.47%	-1,429	-20.09%	7,114
Elko	2,474	40.60%	3,388	55.60%	115	1.89%	117	1.92%	-914	-15.00%	6,094
Esmeralda	324	53.20%	235	38.59%	20	3.28%	30	4.93%	89	14.61%	609
Eureka	290	45.24%	323	50.39%	20	3.12%	8	1.25%	-33	-5.15%	641
Humboldt	1,284	44.49%	1,464	50.73%	83	2.88%	55	1.91%	-180	-6.24%	2,886
Lander	750	45.51%	831	50.42%	44	2.67%	23	1.40%	-81	-4.92%	1,648
Lincoln	765	47.05%	782	48.09%	49	3.01%	30	1.85%	-17	-1.05%	1,626
Lyon	2,676	46.52%	2,693	46.82%	213	3.70%	170	2.96%	-17	-0.30%	5,752
Mineral	1,247	53.87%	926	40.00%	94	4.06%	48	2.07%	321	13.87%	2,315
Nye	2,207	53.58%	1,740	42.24%	92	2.23%	80	1.94%	467	11.34%	4,119
Pershing	613	46.26%	644	48.60%	41	3.09%	27	2.04%	-31	-2.34%	1,325
Storey	434	51.42%	341	40.40%	46	5.45%	23	2.73%	93	11.02%	844
Washoe	27,298	46.22%	28,182	47.72%	2,110	3.57%	1,468	2.49%	-884	-1.50%	59,058
White Pine	1,913	57.38%	1,273	38.18%	91	2.73%	57	1.71%	640	19.20%	3,334
Totals	128,132	53.44%	100,104	41.75%	6,894	2.88%	4,621	1.93%	28,028	11.69%	239,751

==== Counties that flipped from Republican to Democratic ====
- Carson City
- Clark
- Esmeralda
- Mineral
- Nye
- White Pine
