= Chic Hecht =

American politician (1928–2006)

United States Ambassador to the Bahamas
- In office August 23, 1989 – March 1, 1993
- President: George H. W. Bush; Bill Clinton
- Preceded by: Carol Boyd Hallett
- Succeeded by: Sid Williams

United States Senator from Nevada
- In office January 3, 1983 – January 3, 1989
- Preceded by: Howard Cannon
- Succeeded by: Richard Bryan

Member of the Nevada Senate
- In office 1967–1975

Personal details
- Born: Mayer Jacob Hecht; November 30, 1928 Cape Girardeau, Missouri, U.S.
- Died: May 15, 2006 (aged 77) Las Vegas, Nevada, U.S.
- Party: Republican
- Spouse: Gail Kahn
- Relations: Darryl Nirenberg (son-in-law)
- Children: 2
- Education: Washington University in St. Louis (BS)

Mayer Jacob Hecht (November 30, 1928 – May 15, 2006) was an American Republican politician and diplomat who served as a United States senator from Nevada from 1983 to 1989, and as U.S. ambassador to the Bahamas from 1989 to 1993.

== Early life and education ==
Hecht was born into a Jewish family in Cape Girardeau, Missouri. His mother was born in Kyiv and his paternal grandparents were from Poland and Germany. He received a Bachelor of Science degree in retailing from Washington University in St. Louis in 1949.

=== Korean War ===
Hecht attended Military Intelligence School at Fort Holabird and served as a counter intelligence special agent with the U.S. armed forces during the Korean War, from 1951 to 1953.

Hecht was a member of the National Military Intelligence Association, and was inducted into the Military Intelligence Hall of Fame in 1988.

== Career ==
After leaving military service, Hecht moved to Nevada. His business activities included retailing, the operation of a bank, and interests in hotels. He married the former Gail Kahn in 1959.

=== Politics ===
In 1966, he was elected to the Nevada Senate, the first Republican to represent his predominantly Democratic district in and around Las Vegas in more than 25 years. He was a state senator from 1967 to 1975, serving as Senate minority leader from 1969 to 1970.

=== U.S. Senate ===
In 1982, he was elected to the U.S. Senate, replacing four-term incumbent Democrat Howard Cannon, whom he had defeated for reelection. He served only one term, from 1983 to 1989, having been defeated for reelection in 1988 by Democratic Governor Richard Bryan. In the Senate, Hecht became known for his verbal slips and miscues, including a vow at one point not to permit a "nuclear suppository" in his home state.

=== Ambassador ===
After his loss, he was then appointed ambassador to the Bahamas by President George H. W. Bush on March 24, 1989. During his confirmation, he encountered opposition from some Democratic senators, an unusual occurrence for senators to oppose the nomination of a former colleague. Some members like Senator Bob Graham and John Breaux argued Hecht was unqualified to serve in a position growing in importance in the War on Drugs and took exception to Hecht's remarks during his confirmation hearing, when he stated he would feel at home because the position "is a nice lifestyle" with "a lot of nice golf courses and good fishing." Nevertheless, Hecht was easily confirmed by a 78 to 19 vote on July 11, 1989. He served from 1989 until 1993.

=== Activism for Soviet Jews ===
Before the Reykjavík Summit in 1986, Hecht met with President Ronald Reagan. Hecht urged Reagan to ask Soviet leader Mikhail Gorbachev to ease emigration requirements for Soviet Jews, including those on a list that had been prepared by a member of the Council for Soviet Jewry. Hecht reported his effort as successful:

The former senator related that Reagan told him afterwards that he had given the list to the Soviet leader at the beginning of the summit when the two men met alone. Hecht said that Reagan was told by Gorbachev, "as long as nothing is in the paper, there is no publicity, and we don't hear about it," Jews on the list would be quietly released.

Hecht credited the Lubavitcher Rebbe, Rabbi Menachem Schneerson, for prompting him to undertake the effort.

=== Relationship with John Kerry ===
Hecht's name reappeared in the news in the course of the 2004 presidential election because of an event during his term in the Senate. On July 12, 1988, Hecht was leaving a Republican weekly policy lunch when he began to choke on an apple slice from his lunch of fruit salad and cottage cheese. Unable to talk to his colleagues and not wanting to vomit on them, he ran into the hallway, where Senator Kit Bond, a Republican from Missouri, unsuccessfully tried to help Hecht. Senator John Kerry, a Democrat, stepping off an elevator at the same time, recognized what was happening to Hecht and quickly performed the Heimlich maneuver, saving Hecht's life.

For the rest of his life, Hecht always called Kerry on Christmas Day (December 25) each year to thank him. Though a conservative Republican who contributed the maximum amount to the re-election campaign of George W. Bush, Hecht said that he would appear in support of Kerry if asked, though he declined to reveal whether he planned to vote for Kerry or for Bush. One of Hecht's daughters, Leslie Helmer, who worked for the presidential campaigns of Ronald Reagan and George H. W. Bush, helped raise funds for Kerry's campaign, out of gratitude for his action.

=== Later career ===
After finishing his time as ambassador to the Bahamas in 1994, Hecht returned home to Las Vegas to focus on his business activities. On May 24, 2016, his brother, businessman and philanthropist Martin Hecht, died in Palm Springs, California. The Hecht Synagogue at the Hebrew University of Jerusalem was constructed through funds raised for over a decade by Martin. Opened in 1981 and dedicated in 1985 in the presence of the Hecht brothers and Senator Jesse Helms, it was named after the Hechts' then 96-year-old father.

== Personal life ==
Hecht was diagnosed with prostate cancer in 2005. He died of the cancer on May 15, 2006, at the age of 77. Hecht was survived by his wife and two daughters, Lori and Lesley.

== See also ==
- List of Jewish members of the United States Congress

Party political offices
Preceded by David Towell	Republican nominee for U.S. Senator from Nevada (Class 1); 1982, 1988	Succeeded by Hal Furman
U.S. Senate
Preceded by Howard Cannon	U.S. senator (Class 1) from Nevada; 1983–1989; Served alongside: Paul Laxalt, Harry Reid	Succeeded by Richard Bryan
Diplomatic posts
Preceded by Carol Boyd Hallett	United States Ambassador to the Bahamas; August 23, 1989–March 1, 1993	Succeeded by Lino Gutierrez (as Chargé d'Affaires ad interim)
