= 1994 United States Senate election in Nevada =

- November 8, 1994
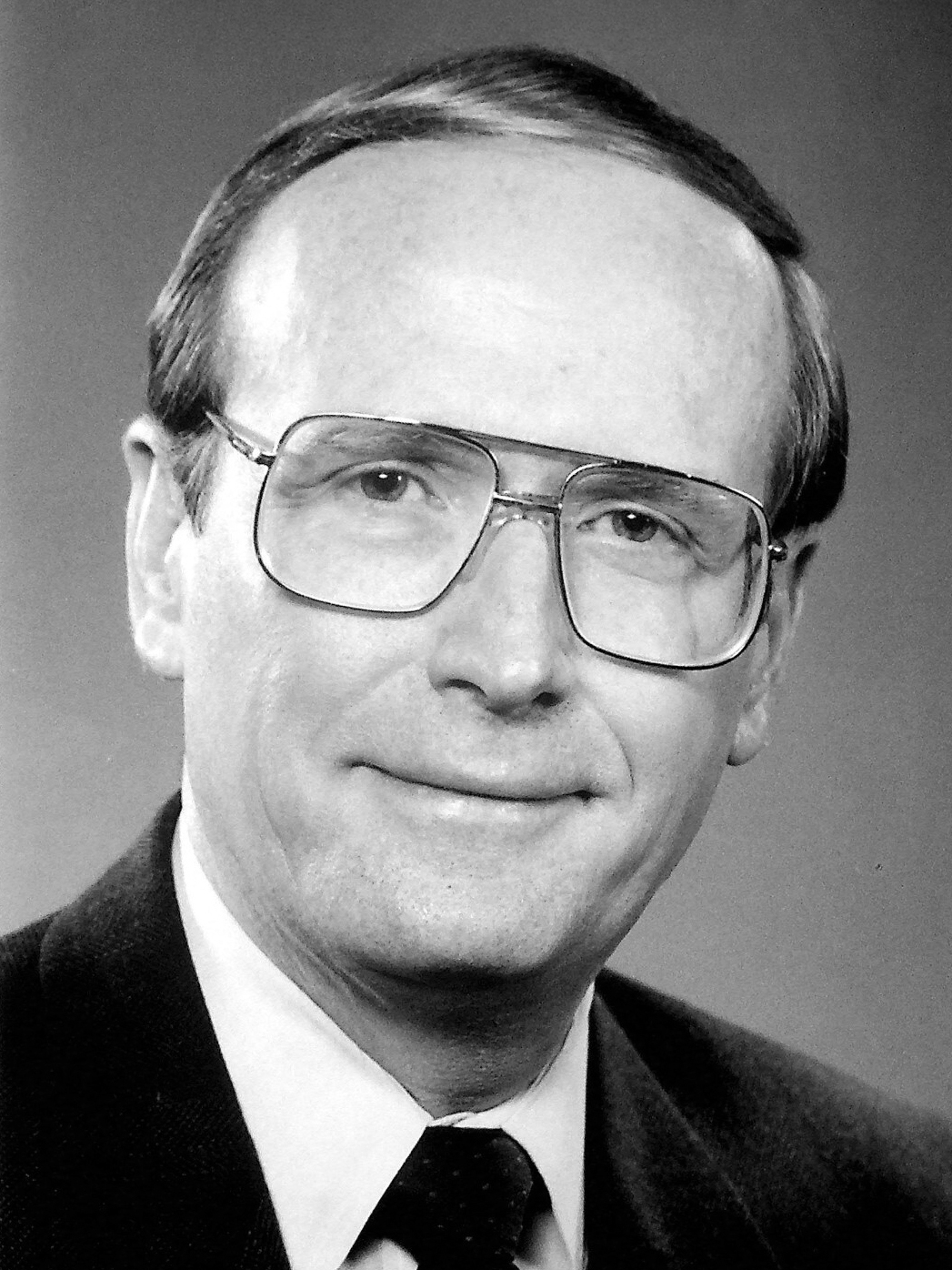

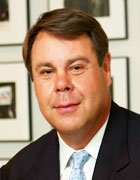
Nominee	Richard Bryan	Hal Furman
Party	Democratic	Republican
Popular vote	193,804	156,020
Percentage	50.93%	41.00%
- County results Bryan: 40–50% 50–60% Furman: 40–50% 50–60% 60–70%
U.S. senator before election
Richard Bryan
Democratic
Elected U.S. Senator
Richard Bryan
Democratic

The 1994 United States Senate election in Nevada was held November 8, 1994. Incumbent Democrat Richard Bryan won re-election to a second term. This was the last time a Democrat won Nevada's Class 1 Senate Seat until Jacky Rosen was elected to it in 2018.

== Democratic primary ==
=== Candidates ===
- Richard Bryan, incumbent U.S. Senator

=== Results ===
Bryan was unopposed in the Democratic primary.

== Republican primary ==
=== Candidates ===
- Hal Furman, former Principal Deputy Assistant Secretary of the Interior for Water and Science and former legislative counsel to U.S. Senator Paul Laxalt
- Charles Woods

=== Results ===
Republican primary results
Party	Candidate	Votes	%
Republican	Hal Furman	58,521	50.46
Republican	Charles Woods	29,601	25.52
None of These Candidates		15,788	13.61
Republican	John Vincent Balistere	4,964	4.28
Republican	David L. Hough	4,135	1.42
Total votes		113,009	100.00

== General election ==
=== Candidates ===
- Richard Bryan (D), incumbent U.S. Senator
- Hal Furman (R), former Principal Deputy Assistant Secretary of the Interior for Water and Science and former legislative counsel to U.S. Senator Paul Laxalt

=== Results ===
General election results
Party	Candidate	Votes	%
Democratic	Richard Bryan (Incumbent)	193,804	50.93%
Republican	Hal Furman	156,020	41.00%
None of These Candidates		12,626	3.3%
Independent	Anna Nevenic	6,666	1.8%
Libertarian	Bob Days	5,964	1.6%
Independent	Neal A. Grasteit	5,450	1.4%
Total votes		380,530	100.00
Democratic hold			

== See also ==
- 1994 United States Senate elections
