= Hal Furman =

American lawyer

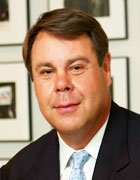
- Born: June 2, 1955 (age 70); Denver, Colorado, U.S.
- Education: University of Southern California, B.A. 1977; University of Southern California Law Center, J.D. 1980
- Occupations: Businessman, consultant
- Known for: 1994 Nevada U.S. Senate Race, Government Official, Founder of The Furman Group, Inc.
- Website: https://www.furmangroup.com/

Harold Warren Furman II, "Hal" (born June 2, 1955) is an American businessman and a former U.S. government official. He co-founded and serves as the chairman and managing director of The Furman Group, a water infrastructure consulting firm based in Washington, D.C.

In 1994, Furman ran for the United States Senate from Nevada. While he won the crowded Republican primary, he lost the general election to the incumbent Senator, Richard Bryan.

== Education ==
Furman graduated from The University of Southern California with a degree in political science, and then went on to get his Juris Doctor from the University of Southern California Law Center. After graduating and passing the State Bar of Nevada, he briefly practiced law in Reno, Nevada with Woodburn, Wedge, Blakey, & Jeppson.

== Career ==
=== Government ===
In 1981, Furman became Legislative Counsel to the United States Senator Paul Laxalt (R-NV); he then went on to become Special Counsel to the Commissioner of the United States Bureau of Reclamation.

In 1983, President Ronald Reagan appointed Furman as the Principal Deputy Assistant Secretary for Water and Science. In that capacity, he oversaw the U.S. Geological Survey, the Bureau of Mines, and the Bureau of Reclamation.

He served as the principal water policy advisor to three Secretaries of the Interior: James G. Watt, William P. Clark, and Donald P. Hodel. While in government, he often was asked to testify before Congressional hearings on water issues.

During his tenure at the Interior Department, Furman worked to negotiate technical assistance agreements involving the reconstruction of the power plant at the Aswan Dam in Egypt and another involving the Three Gorges Dam in China. In recognition of his work on the latter agreement, Engineering News-Record named Furman one of its People of the Year in 1985.

After leaving government service, Furman became a partner in the Washington, D.C. office of Heron, Burchette, Ruckert, & Rothwell, working on behalf of clients that were building water infrastructure projects.

Furman served a specialist in designing financing solutions involving both government and private financing for water and sanitation projects. In 1992, while representing several large southern California water agencies, he worked with the United States Congress to create the Bureau of Reclamation Title XVI Program to encourage the development of water recycling and reuse projects.

He later served as the executive director of the New Water Supply Coalition, an advocacy group consisting of some of the Nation's largest water utilities. The New Water Supply Coalition advocated the use of tax credit bonds to assist in the financing of qualified water supply projects. The concept was later incorporated into the American Recovery and Reinvestment Act of 2009 as "Build America Bonds."

=== The Furman Group ===
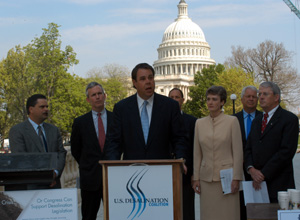
Hal Furman speaking on behalf of the New Water Supply Coalition

Furman is the chairman and managing director of The Furman Group, which he founded in 1992. He advises clients in the area of water and sanitation on government affairs and specialized consulting services. Additionally, he heads Balboa Resources, Inc, which provides project consulting services to clients domestically and abroad in the area of water infrastructure development and public-private partnerships.

=== Politics ===
In 1994, Furman was the Republican nominee for the United States Senate in Nevada. He captured the party's nomination with 50% of the vote against a crowded field, but lost the general election to the incumbent Senator, Richard Bryan.

In 1996, Furman chaired Senator Robert Dole's Presidential campaign in Nevada. He was a delegate to the GOP Convention in San Diego and served on the Platform Committee.

In 2000 and 2008, Furman served on the National Finance Committee for Senator John McCain's two Presidential campaigns. In 2008, he was a delegate to the Republican Convention in Minneapolis-St. Paul.

Party political offices
Preceded by Chic Hecht	Republican nominee for U.S. Senator from Nevada (Class 1); 1994	Succeeded by John Ensign
