= Richard Bryan =

American attorney and politician (born 1937)

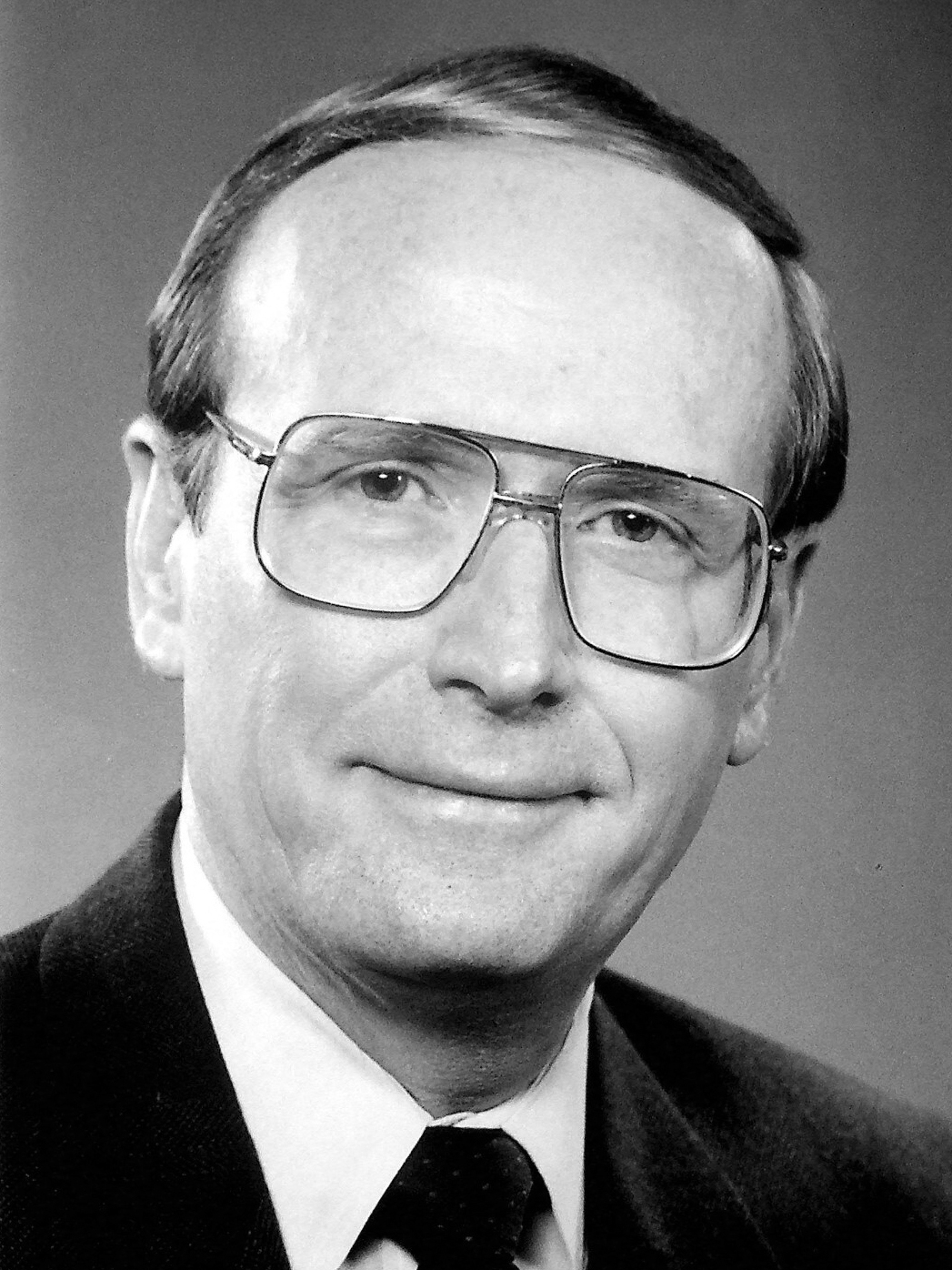

Chair of the Senate Ethics Committee
- In office January 3, 1993 – January 3, 1995
- Preceded by: Terry Sanford
- Succeeded by: Mitch McConnell

United States Senator from Nevada
- In office January 3, 1989 – January 3, 2001
- Preceded by: Chic Hecht
- Succeeded by: John Ensign

25th Governor of Nevada
- In office January 3, 1983 – January 3, 1989
- Lieutenant: Bob Cashell; Bob Miller
- Preceded by: Robert List
- Succeeded by: Bob Miller

27th Attorney General of Nevada
- In office January 1, 1979 – January 3, 1983
- Governor: Robert List
- Preceded by: Robert List
- Succeeded by: Brian McKay

Personal details
- Born: Richard Hudson Bryan; July 16, 1937 (age 89) Washington, D.C., U.S.
- Party: Democratic
- Spouse: Bonnie Fairchild (m. 1962; died 2016)
- Children: 3
- Education: University of Nevada, Reno (BA); University of California, Hastings (JD)

Military service
- Allegiance: United States
- Branch: United States Army
- Service years: 1959–1960

Richard Hudson Bryan (born July 16, 1937) is an American retired politician and attorney who served as the 25th governor of Nevada from 1983 to 1989 and as a United States senator representing Nevada from 1989 until 2001. A Democrat, Bryan previously served as the state's attorney general and a member of the State Senate.

== Early life ==
Bryan was born in Washington, D.C., and graduated from the University of Nevada at Reno in 1959 where he was a member of Alpha Tau Omega and the president of ASUN. He earned his J.D. degree from the University of California, Hastings College of the Law. In 1963 he was admitted to the Nevada Bar. He was Clark County's first public defender.

== Political career ==
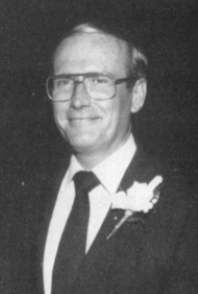
Bryan as governor.

Bryan served as a member of the Nevada Senate from 1972 to 1978. In 1979, Bryan became the Nevada Attorney General, and served in the position until 1983.

=== Governor of Nevada ===
In 1982, Bryan challenged incumbent Republican Nevada Governor Robert List, who was running for reelection. He defeated List and became governor in January 1983. Bryan was easily reelected in 1986, defeating Nevada State Treasurer Patricia Cafferata.

He became known for his frequent invitations to state legislators to join the governor for meals at the governor's mansion. The practice created goodwill between the governor and legislators of both parties.

=== U.S. Senate ===
By 1987, Bryan was encouraged by several prominent politicians, including Harry Reid and Alan Cranston, to run for the U.S. Senate. He declared his candidacy shortly after, and in the 1988 U.S. Senate election, he defeated incumbent Republican Senator Chic Hecht. He was sworn in at the convening of the 101st Congress on January 3, 1989. During his tenure in the Senate, Bryan served on the Finance, Banking, Intelligence, and Commerce Committees.

Bryan was an opponent of Search for extraterrestrial intelligence (SETI), stating: "As of today millions have been spent and we have yet to bag a single little green fellow. Not a single Martian has said take me to your leader, and not a single flying saucer has applied for FAA approval." He introduced an amendment to the 1994 budget that secured the cancellation of the High Resolution Microwave Survey and terminated NASA's SETI efforts less than one year after their launch. Bryan ran for reelection in the Senate in 1994, easily defeating Republican challenger Hal Furman.

Bryan also focused on preventing Yucca Mountain from being used as a nuclear waste long-term storage site. Although the Yucca Mountain nuclear waste repository would be built during Bryan's time in the Senate, his opposition delayed any actual storage from occurring. This opposition would continue after Bryan had retired before plans for storage were discontinued by President Barack Obama.

Bryan opted not to run for a third term in the Senate in 2000.

Legal offices
Preceded by Robert List	Attorney General of Nevada; 1979–1983	Succeeded by Brian McKay
Party political offices
Preceded by Robert E. Rose	Democratic nominee for Governor of Nevada; 1982, 1986	Succeeded by Bob Miller
Preceded by Howard Cannon	Democratic nominee for U.S. Senator from Nevada (Class 1); 1988, 1994	Succeeded by Edward Bernstein
Political offices
Preceded by Robert List	Governor of Nevada; 1983–1989	Succeeded by Bob Miller
U.S. Senate
Preceded by Chic Hecht	U.S. Senator (Class 1) from Nevada; 1989–2001; Served alongside: Harry Reid	Succeeded by John Ensign
Preceded by Terry Sanford	Chair of the Senate Ethics Committee; 1993–1995	Succeeded by Mitch McConnell
Preceded by Mitch McConnell	Ranking Member of the Senate Ethics Committee; 1995–1997	Succeeded by Harry Reid
U.S. order of precedence (ceremonial)
Preceded by Gordon H. Smith as Former U.S. Senator	Order of precedence of the United States as Former U.S. Senator	Succeeded by Bob Kerrey as Former U.S. Senator
