= 1988 United States Senate election in Nevada =

- November 8, 1988
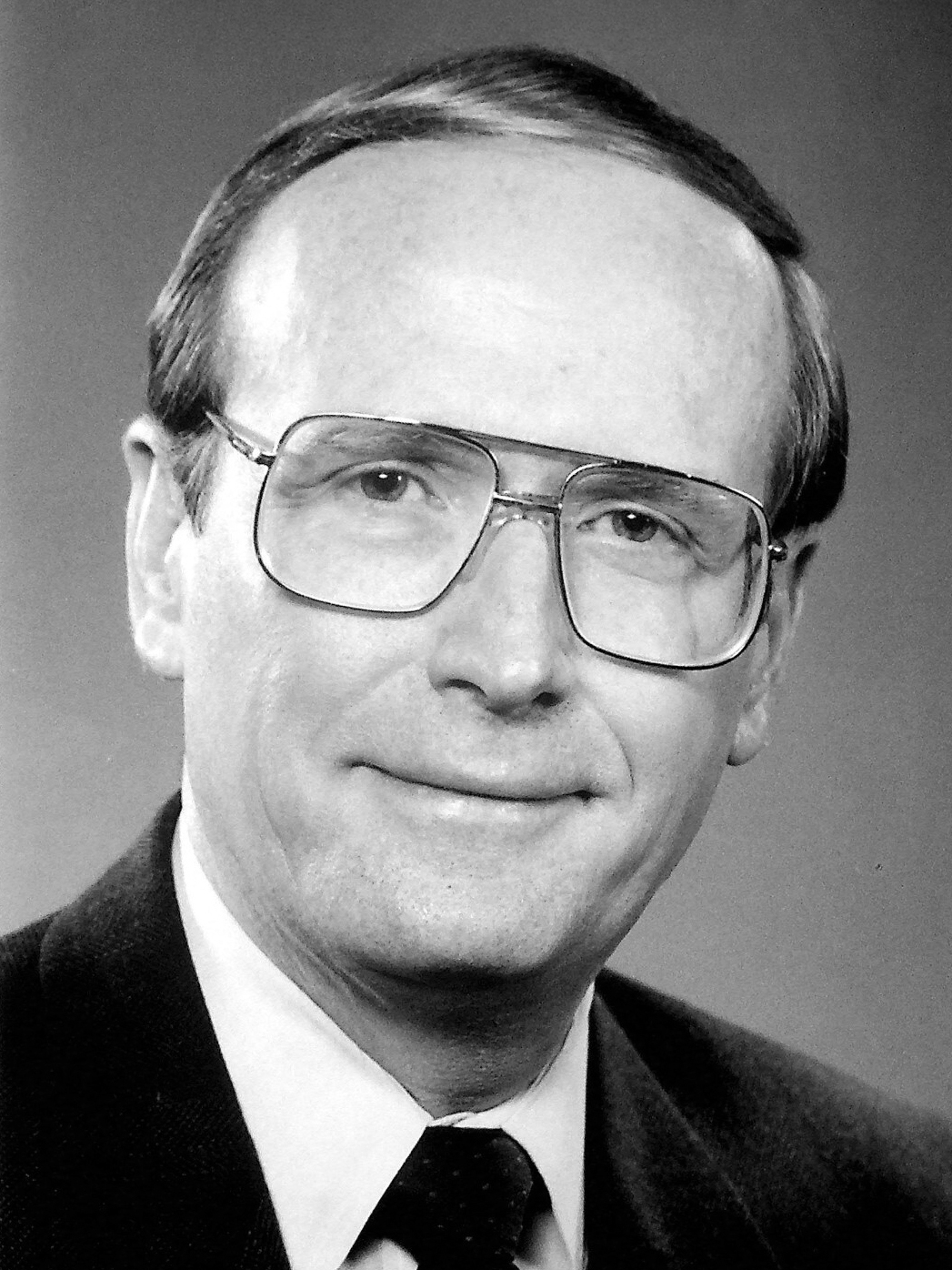

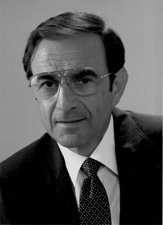
Nominee	Richard Bryan	Chic Hecht
Party	Democratic	Republican
Popular vote	175,548	161,336
Percentage	50.21%	46.14%
- County results Bryan: 40–50% 50–60% Hecht: 50–60% 60–70% 70–80% No vote: (Note: Bullfrog County, an enclave of Nye County extant from 1987 to 1989, had no population and thus recorded no votes.)
U.S. senator before election
Chic Hecht
Republican
Elected U.S. Senator
Richard Bryan
Democratic

The 1988 United States Senate election in Nevada was held on November 8, 1988. Incumbent Republican U.S. Senator Chic Hecht ran for re-election to a second term, but was defeated by Democratic Governor Richard Bryan despite Republican nominee George H.W. Bush carrying the state in the concurrent presidential race.

== Democratic primary ==
=== Candidates ===
- Richard Bryan, Governor of Nevada
- Patrick Matthew "Pat" Fitzpatrick
- Manny Beals
- Larry Kepler

=== Results ===
Democratic primary results
Party	Candidate	Votes	%
Democratic	Richard Bryan	62,278	79.49
None of These Candidates		7,035	8.98
Democratic	Patrick Matthew "Pat" Fitzpatrick	4,721	6.03
Democratic	Manny Beals	2,656	3.39
Democratic	Larry Kepler	1,655	2.11
Total votes		78,345	100.00

== Republican primary ==
=== Candidates ===
- Chic Hecht, incumbent U.S. Senator
- Larry Scheffler

=== Results ===
Republican primary results
Party	Candidate	Votes	%
Republican	Chic Hecht (incumbent)	55,473	82.12
None of These Candidates		6,460	9.56
Republican	Larry Scheffler	5,618	8.32
Total votes		67,551	100.00

== General election ==
=== Candidates ===
- Richard Bryan (D), Governor of Nevada
- Chic Hecht (R), incumbent U.S. Senator

=== Results ===
General election results
Party	Candidate	Votes	%
Democratic	Richard Bryan	175,548	50.21%
Republican	Chic Hecht (incumbent)	161,336	46.14%
None of These Candidates		7,242	2.07%
Libertarian	James Frye	5,523	1.58%
Total votes		349,649	100.00%
Democratic gain from Republican			

== See also ==
- 1988 United States Senate elections
