= Nevada Republican Party =

Nevada affiliate of the Republican Party

- Chairperson: Michael J. McDonald
- Governor of Nevada: Joe Lombardo
- Lieutenant Governor of Nevada: Stavros Anthony
- Nevada Senate: Robin Titus
- Assembly Minority Leader: P. K. O'Neill
- Founded: 1864; 161 years ago
- Headquarters: 3652 South Virginia Street, Reno, Nevada 89502
- Membership (October 2025): ▲657,563
- Ideology: Conservatism
- National affiliation: Republican Party
- Colors: Red
- Statewide Executive Offices: 3 / 6
- Nevada Senate: 8 / 21
- Nevada Assembly: 15 / 42
- United States Senate: 0 / 2
- United States House of Representatives: 1 / 4

Election symbol

Website
- www.nevadagop.org

The Nevada Republican Party is the affiliate of the Republican Party in Nevada. The organization has a history that goes back to 1864. The party currently controls Nevada's governorship, controllership, and lieutenant governorship, which are currently held by Joe Lombardo, Andy Matthews, and Stavros Anthony respectively.

== History ==
Nevada was founded as a state on October 31, 1864. When the state was first formed it was a Republican state. Some speculate that this was because of Nevadans' loyalty to the president who brought them into the Union, Abraham Lincoln. In the first two general elections all the constitutionally elected positions went to the Republicans. This changed starting in 1871 when four out of the six constitutional positions were won by the Democrats.

In the general elections of 1894 and 1898 the Silver Party, a party created to go against European and Eastern American bankers, swept the election. Nevada first held a primary election in 1910. In 1929 the offices were split evenly between the Democratic and Republican Parties. This was the turning point though. Once the Great Depression hit the elections from 1932 to the 1990s the Democratic Party held the majority throughout the state.

In 1994 and in 1998 the Republicans were the majority in the state. In 2002 Republicans swept all of the offices in Nevada. In the 2004 election Nevada was considered a battleground state because the difference between the two parties that year was 4,431. Throughout much of Nevada's political history it has been seen as a battleground state. Since 1992 the state has gone back and forth between Republican and Democratic candidates for the presidency. In the elections of 1992 and 1996 the state voted for the Democratic candidate, in 2000 and 2004 they voted for the Republican candidate, and finally in the 2008 election the state voted for the Democrats. This is primarily because of the rise of the Latino population. Nevada was expected to be a battleground state in the presidential election in 2012 as well.

On June 23, 2018, President Donald Trump addressed the 2018 Nevada Republican Party State Convention in Las Vegas.

=== 2020 election and aftermath ===
In the aftermath of the 2020 presidential election, the Nevada GOP supported Donald Trump's false claims of fraud and attempts to overturn the election results in the state after Joe Biden was declared the victor. On November 3, 2020, the state GOP and the Trump campaign attempted to slow down the processing of mail-in ballots in Clark County, claiming that the county wasn't abiding by state law in allowing people to observe the processing of ballots. Soon after, Nevada Republicans made false claims surrounding the results in the county.

On November 5, the Nevada Republican Party alleged "at least 3,062 instances of voter fraud". Republican lawyers released a list of over 3,000 people who allegedly did not live in Clark County, Nevada, when they voted. However, these were not proven to be illegal votes, because Nevada (a) allows for people who moved states 30 days before the election to vote in Nevada's election, and (b) allows people studying in colleges in another state to vote in Nevada's election. Additionally, the list featured military members who were overseas and voted by mail.

On November 17, 2020, Nevada Republican representatives of the Trump campaign asked a judge to nullify Biden's 33,596-vote margin, and simply declare Trump the winner and his electors elected, citing unsubstantiated claims of fraud. However, on November 24, the Nevada Supreme Court certified Biden as the winner of the state. On December 4, 2020, the Nevada GOP vowed to appeal the certification of Biden's victory and overturn his win in the state. On December 14, hours after Nevada's six electors cast the state's electoral votes for Biden, Nevada Republican electors unofficially cast their symbolic votes for Trump. The Nevada GOP expressed support for the unofficial electors and alleged that there was fraud in the Nevada election.

In April 2021, the Nevada GOP censured Republican secretary of state Barbara Cegavske, accusing her of failing to investigate allegations of fraud in the 2020 election. Cegavske responded by saying that members of her party were attacking her for refusing to "put my thumb on the scale of democracy" and said that there was no evidence of widespread fraud in the election. In June 2021, the Nevada GOP expressed approval of the controversial Arizona audit and have considered whether they can enact a similar audit for the 2020 Nevada election.

== By-laws ==
The By-laws of the Nevada Republicans were amended on December 13, 2008. Article one says the name of the organization. Article two describes its purpose. The purpose of this political organization is to provide leadership, recruit, develop, and elect officials. It wants to provide a responsible representative government. It also wants to keep the rights and freedom for all citizens. Article three discusses the duties and the headquarters of this organization. This article goes into details about how conventions should be held. Article four provides the rules and regulations for the meetings. These rules describe everything from when meetings should be held, how voting works, where these meetings are held, and everything in between. Article five discusses membership in this organization. The first is that the members must be part of the Republican Party. They then go into the elected officials for the party. Article six goes into details about the officers for the organization and their specific duties that those positions have. Article seven discusses elections while section eight talks about the standing committees and their responsibilities.

Article nine talks about the Republican organization and how it associates with it. Article ten goes into the voting and proxies in the Nevada State Republican party by-laws. Article eleven discusses the executive committee, its membership and its duties. Article twelve goes into detail about the requirements for the committees and the conventions. Article thirteen talks about amendments to the by-laws, particularly how to make amendments to the by-laws. Article fourteen discusses parliamentary authority while article fifteen talks about election laws. Finally article sixteen goes into details about how the organization should support candidates. It will not recognize any candidate who has been convicted of a felony or, while serving in a public office was impeached and convicted or removed from office for any reason, unless the Nevada Republican Central Committee or a Convention of the Nevada Republican Party shall waive this rule by a two-thirds (2/3) vote of the members or delegates present.

== Current elected officials ==
The Nevada Republican Party controls three of the state's six statewide offices and the Republicans are the minority in both the Nevada Senate and the Nevada Assembly. Republicans hold none of the state's U.S. Senate seats and one of its four U.S. House of Representatives seats.

=== Members of Congress ===
==== U.S. Senate ====
- None

Both of Nevada's U.S. Senate seats have been held by Democrats since 2019. Dean Heller was the last Republican to represent Nevada in the U.S. Senate. First appointed in 2011 following the resignation of John Ensign, Heller won a full term in 2012 and lost re-election in 2018.

==== U.S. House of Representatives ====
Out of the four seats Nevada is apportioned in the U.S. House of Representatives, one is held by a Republican:

District	Member	Photo
2nd	Mark Amodei	

=== Statewide offices ===
Republicans control three of the six elected statewide offices:

- Governor: Joe Lombardo
- Lieutenant Governor: Stavros Anthony
- State Controller: Andy Matthews

=== State legislative leaders ===
- Senate Minority Leader: James Settelmeyer
- Assembly Minority Leader: Robin L. Titus

=== State Senate ===
Republican members of the Nevada Senate:

- Becky Harris, 9th District
- Joe Hardy, 12th District
- Don Gustavson, 14th District
- Heidi Gansert, 15th District
- Ben Kieckhefer, 16th District
- James Settelmeyer, 17th District
- Scott Hammond, 18th District
- Pete Goicoechea, 19th District
- Michael Roberson, 20th District

=== State Assembly ===
Republican members of the Nevada State Assembly:

- John Hambrick, 2nd District
- Richard McArthur, 4th District
- Paul Anderson, 13th District
- Chris Edwards, 19th District
- Keith Pickard, 22nd District
- Melissa Woodbury, 23rd District
- Jill Tolles, 25th District
- Lisa Krasner, 26th District
- Ira Hansen, 32nd District
- John Ellison, 33rd District
- James Oscarson, 36th District
- Jim Marchant, 37th District
- Robin L. Titus, 38th District
- Jim Wheeler, 39th District
- Al Kramer, 40th District

== Executive Board ==
Chairman: Michael J. McDonald

Vice Chairman: Jim Hendal

Secretary: Barbara Hawn

Treasurer: Kathy Njus

National Committeeman: Jim DeGraffenreid III

National Committeewoman: Sigal Chattah

== Election results ==
=== Presidential ===
Nevada Republican Party presidential election results
Election	Presidential ticket	Votes	Vote %	Electoral votes	Result
1864	Abraham Lincoln/Andrew Johnson	9,826	59.84%	2 / 2	Won
1868	Ulysses S. Grant/Schuyler Colfax	6,480	55.39%	3 / 3	Won
1872	Ulysses S. Grant/Henry Wilson	8,413	57.43%	3 / 3	Won
1876	Rutherford B. Hayes/William A. Wheeler	10,383	52.73%	3 / 3	Won
1880	James A. Garfield/Chester A. Arthur	8,732	47.60%	0 / 3	Lost
1884	James G. Blaine/John A. Logan	7,193	56.21%	3 / 3	Lost
1888	Benjamin Harrison/Levi P. Morton	7,088	57.73%	3 / 3	Won
1892	Benjamin Harrison/Whitelaw Reid	2,811	25.84%	0 / 3	Lost
1896	William McKinley/Garret Hobart	1,938	18.79%	0 / 3	Won
1900	William McKinley/Theodore Roosevelt	3,849	37.75%	0 / 3	Won
1904	Theodore Roosevelt/Charles W. Fairbanks	6,864	56.66%	3 / 3	Won
1908	William Howard Taft/James S. Sherman	10,775	43.93%	0 / 3	Won
1912	William Howard Taft/Nicholas M. Butler	3,196	15.89%	0 / 3	Lost
1916	Charles E. Hughes/Charles W. Fairbanks	12,127	36.40%	0 / 3	Lost
1920	Warren G. Harding/Calvin Coolidge	15,479	56.92%	3 / 3	Won
1924	Calvin Coolidge/Charles G. Dawes	11,243	41.76%	3 / 3	Won
1928	Herbert Hoover/Charles Curtis	18,327	56.54%	3 / 3	Won
1932	Herbert Hoover/Charles Curtis	12,764	30.59%	0 / 3	Lost
1936	Alf Landon/Frank Knox	11,923	27.19%	0 / 3	Lost
1940	Wendell Willkie/Charles L. McNary	21,229	39.92%	0 / 3	Lost
1944	Thomas E. Dewey/John W. Bricker	24,611	45.38%	0 / 3	Lost
1948	Thomas E. Dewey/Earl Warren	29,357	47.26%	0 / 3	Lost
1952	Dwight D. Eisenhower/Richard Nixon	50,502	61.45%	3 / 3	Won
1956	Dwight D. Eisenhower/Richard Nixon	56,049	57.97%	3 / 3	Won
1960	Richard Nixon/Henry Cabot Lodge Jr.	52,387	48.84%	0 / 3	Lost
1964	Barry Goldwater/William E. Miller	56,094	41.42%	0 / 3	Lost
1968	Richard Nixon/Spiro Agnew	73,188	47.46%	3 / 3	Won
1972	Richard Nixon/Spiro Agnew	115,750	63.68%	3 / 3	Won
1976	Gerald Ford/Bob Dole	101,273	50.17%	3 / 3	Lost
1980	Ronald Reagan/George H. W. Bush	155,017	62.54%	3 / 3	Won
1984	Ronald Reagan/George H. W. Bush	188,770	65.85%	4 / 4	Won
1988	George H. W. Bush/Dan Quayle	206,040	58.86%	4 / 4	Won
1992	George H. W. Bush/Dan Quayle	175,828	34.73%	0 / 4	Lost
1996	Bob Dole/Jack Kemp	199,244	42.91%	0 / 4	Lost
2000	George W. Bush/Dick Cheney	301,575	49.52%	4 / 4	Won
2004	George W. Bush/Dick Cheney	418,690	50.47%	5 / 5	Won
2008	John McCain/Sarah Palin	412,827	42.65%	0 / 5	Lost
2012	Mitt Romney/Paul Ryan	463,567	45.68%	0 / 6	Lost
2016	Donald Trump/Mike Pence	512,058	45.50%	0 / 6	Lost
2020	Donald Trump/Mike Pence	669,890	47.67%	0 / 6	Lost
2024	Donald Trump/JD Vance	751,205	50.59%	6 / 6	Won

=== Gubernatorial ===
Nevada Republican Party gubernatorial election results
Election	Gubernatorial candidate	Votes	Vote %	Result
1864				
1870				
1874				
1878				
1882	Enoch Strother	6,535	45.68%	Lost ✗
1886	Charles C. Stevenson	6,463	52.41%	Won ✓
1890	Roswell K. Colcord	6,601	53.27%	Won ✓
1894	Abner C. Cleveland	3,861	36.87%	Lost ✗
1898	William McMillan	3,548	35.45%	Lost ✗
1902	Abner C. Cleveland	4,778	42.22%	Lost ✗
1906	Jason F. Mitchell	5,336	35.96%	Lost ✗
1910	Tasker Oddie	10,435	50.59%	Won ✓
1914	Tasker Oddie	8,537	39.61%	Lost ✗
1918	Tasker Oddie	11,845	47.92%	Lost ✗
1922	John H. Miller	13,215	46.12%	Lost ✗
1926	Fred B. Balzar	16,374	53.00%	Won ✓
1930	Fred B. Balzar	18,442	53.25%	Won ✓
1934	Morley Griswold	14,778	34.52%	Lost ✗
1938	John A. Fulton	17,586	38.14%	Lost ✗
1942	Aaron V. Tallman	16,164	39.75%	Lost ✗
1946	Melvin E. Jepson	21,247	42.58%	Lost ✗
1950	Charles H. Russell	35,609	57.65%	Won ✓
1954	Charles H. Russell	41,665	53.10%	Won ✓
1958	Charles H. Russell	34,025	40.08%	Lost ✗
1962	Oran K. Gragson	32,145	33.16%	Lost ✗
1966	Paul Laxalt	71,807	52.16%	Won ✓
1970	Ed Fike	64,400	43.81%	Lost ✗
1974	Shirley Crumpler	28,959	17.10%	Lost ✗
1978	Robert List	108,097	56.17%	Won ✓
1982	Robert List	100,104	41.65%	Lost ✗
1986	Patty Cafferata	65,081	25.00%	Lost ✗
1990	Jim Gallaway	95,789	29.86%	Lost ✗
1994	Jim Gibbons	156,875	41.32%	Lost ✗
1998	Kenny Guinn	223,892	51.63%	Won ✓
2002	Kenny Guinn	344,001	68.24%	Won ✓
2006	Jim Gibbons	279,003	47.93%	Won ✓
2010	Brian Sandoval	382,350	53.36%	Won ✓
2014	Brian Sandoval	386,340	70.58%	Won ✓
2018	Adam Laxalt	440,320	45.31%	Lost ✗
2022	Joe Lombardo	497,377	48.81%	Won ✓
2026	Joe Lombardo	480,120	44.22%	Lost ✗
