= Elections in Nevada =

This is a list of elections in the U.S. state of Nevada. Nevada is a swing state in state and federal elections, with margins that typically are under five percent. Unique to the state is the "None of These Candidates" voting option for all statewide and presidential and vice-presidential election ballots. This option is listed along with the names of individuals running for the position and is often described as "none of the above". The option first appeared on the Nevada ballot in 1975.

If the "None of These Candidates" option receives the most votes in an election, then the actual candidate who receives the most votes still wins the election. This has most notably happened on two occasions: in the 1976 Republican primary for Nevada's At-large congressional district, None of These Candidates received 16,097 votes, while Walden Earhart won 9,831 votes, followed by Dart Anthony with 8,097 votes. Even though he received fewer votes than "None of These Candidates", Earhart received the Republican nomination. He went on to lose to incumbent Democratic Congressman Jim Santini in the general election. In the 2014 Democratic gubernatorial primary, "None of These Candidates" won 30% of the popular vote, a plurality. Robert Goodman, the runner-up with 25% of the vote, was the Democratic nominee by state law.

In a 2020 study, Nevada was ranked as the 23rd hardest state for citizens to vote in.

== Presidential ==
United States presidential election results for Nevada
Year	Republican		Democratic		Third party(ies)	
Year	No.	%	No.	%	No.	%
1864	9,826	59.84%	6,594	40.16%	0	0.00%
1868	6,480	55.39%	5,218	44.61%	0	0.00%
1872	8,413	57.43%	6,236	42.57%	0	0.00%
1876	10,383	52.73%	9,308	47.27%	0	0.00%
1880	8,732	47.60%	9,613	52.40%	0	0.00%
1884	7,193	56.21%	5,578	43.59%	26	0.20%
1888	7,088	57.73%	5,149	41.94%	41	0.33%
1892	2,811	25.84%	714	6.56%	7,353	67.60%
1896	1,938	18.79%	8,376	81.21%	0	0.00%
1900	3,849	37.75%	6,347	62.25%	0	0.00%
1904	6,864	56.66%	3,982	32.87%	1,269	10.47%
1908	10,775	43.93%	11,212	45.71%	2,539	10.35%
1912	3,196	15.89%	7,986	39.70%	8,933	44.41%
1916	12,127	36.40%	17,776	53.36%	3,413	10.24%
1920	15,479	56.92%	9,851	36.22%	1,864	6.85%
1924	11,243	41.76%	5,909	21.95%	9,769	36.29%
1928	18,327	56.54%	14,090	43.46%	0	0.00%
1932	12,674	30.59%	28,756	69.41%	0	0.00%
1936	11,923	27.19%	31,925	72.81%	0	0.00%
1940	21,229	39.92%	31,945	60.08%	0	0.00%
1944	24,611	45.38%	29,623	54.62%	0	0.00%
1948	29,357	47.26%	31,291	50.37%	1,469	2.36%
1952	50,502	61.45%	31,688	38.55%	0	0.00%
1956	56,049	57.97%	40,640	42.03%	0	0.00%
1960	52,387	48.84%	54,880	51.16%	0	0.00%
1964	56,094	41.42%	79,339	58.58%	0	0.00%
1968	73,188	47.46%	60,598	39.29%	20,432	13.25%
1972	115,750	63.68%	66,016	36.32%	0	0.00%
1976	101,273	50.17%	92,479	45.81%	8,124	4.02%
1980	155,017	62.54%	66,666	26.89%	26,202	10.57%
1984	188,770	65.85%	91,655	31.97%	6,242	2.18%
1988	206,040	58.86%	132,738	37.92%	11,289	3.22%
1992	175,828	34.73%	189,148	37.36%	141,342	27.92%
1996	199,244	42.91%	203,974	43.93%	61,061	13.15%
2000	301,575	49.52%	279,978	45.98%	27,417	4.50%
2004	418,690	50.47%	397,190	47.88%	13,707	1.65%
2008	412,827	42.65%	533,736	55.15%	21,285	2.20%
2012	463,567	45.68%	531,373	52.36%	19,978	1.97%
2016	512,058	45.50%	539,260	47.92%	74,067	6.58%
2020	669,890	47.67%	703,486	50.06%	32,000	2.28%
2024	751,205	50.59%	705,197	47.49%	28,438	1.92%

== National legislative ==
=== House of Representatives ===
- 2006 United States House of Representatives elections in Nevada
- 2006 Nevada's 2nd congressional district election
- 2008 United States House of Representatives elections in Nevada
- 2010 United States House of Representatives elections in Nevada
- 2011 Nevada's 2nd congressional district special election
- 2012 United States House of Representatives elections in Nevada
- 2014 United States House of Representatives elections in Nevada
- 2016 United States House of Representatives elections in Nevada
- 2018 United States House of Representatives elections in Nevada
- 2020 United States House of Representatives elections in Nevada
- 2022 United States House of Representatives elections in Nevada
- 2024 United States House of Representatives elections in Nevada
- 2026 United States House of Representatives elections in Nevada

=== Senate ===
- 1958 United States Senate election in Nevada
- 1964 United States Senate election in Nevada
- 1970 United States Senate election in Nevada
- 1974 United States Senate election in Nevada
- 1976 United States Senate election in Nevada
- 1980 United States Senate election in Nevada
- 1982 United States Senate election in Nevada
- 1986 United States Senate election in Nevada
- 1988 United States Senate election in Nevada
- 1992 United States Senate election in Nevada
- 1994 United States Senate election in Nevada
- 1998 United States Senate election in Nevada
- 2000 United States Senate election in Nevada
- 2004 United States Senate election in Nevada
- 2006 United States Senate election in Nevada
- 2010 United States Senate election in Nevada
- 2012 United States Senate election in Nevada
- 2016 United States Senate election in Nevada
- 2018 United States Senate election in Nevada
- 2022 United States Senate election in Nevada
- 2024 United States Senate election in Nevada

== State executive ==
=== General ===
- 2010 Nevada elections
- 2012 Nevada elections
- 2014 Nevada elections
- 2016 Nevada elections
- 2018 Nevada elections
- 2020 Nevada elections
- 2022 Nevada elections
- 2024 Nevada elections
- 2026 Nevada elections

=== Gubernatorial ===
- 1906 Nevada gubernatorial election
- 1910 Nevada gubernatorial election
- 1914 Nevada gubernatorial election
- 1918 Nevada gubernatorial election
- 1922 Nevada gubernatorial election
- 1926 Nevada gubernatorial election
- 1930 Nevada gubernatorial election
- 1934 Nevada gubernatorial election
- 1938 Nevada gubernatorial election
- 1942 Nevada gubernatorial election
- 1946 Nevada gubernatorial election
- 1950 Nevada gubernatorial election
- 1954 Nevada gubernatorial election
- 1958 Nevada gubernatorial election
- 1962 Nevada gubernatorial election
- 1966 Nevada gubernatorial election
- 1970 Nevada gubernatorial election
- 1974 Nevada gubernatorial election
- 1978 Nevada gubernatorial election
- 1982 Nevada gubernatorial election
- 1986 Nevada gubernatorial election
- 1990 Nevada gubernatorial election
- 1994 Nevada gubernatorial election
- 1998 Nevada gubernatorial election
- 2002 Nevada gubernatorial election
- 2006 Nevada gubernatorial election
- 2010 Nevada gubernatorial election
- 2014 Nevada gubernatorial election
- 2018 Nevada gubernatorial election
- 2022 Nevada gubernatorial election
- 2026 Nevada gubernatorial election

== Other statewide contests ==
=== Secretary of State ===
- 2022 Nevada Secretary of State election

=== State Treasurer ===
- 2022 Nevada State Treasurer election

=== Attorney General ===
- 2018 Nevada Attorney General election
- 2022 Nevada Attorney General election

== Local ==
- 2011 Las Vegas mayoral election
- 2013 North Las Vegas mayoral election
- 2015 Las Vegas mayoral election
- 2017 Henderson mayoral election
- 2017 North Las Vegas mayoral election
- 2018 Reno mayoral election
- 2019 Las Vegas mayoral election
- 2022 Henderson mayoral election
- 2022 North Las Vegas mayoral election
- 2022 Reno mayoral election
- 2024 Las Vegas mayoral election
- 2026 Henderson mayoral election
- 2026 North Las Vegas mayoral election
- 2026 Reno mayoral election

== Other ==
- 2002 Nevada Question 2
- 2016 initiative to legalize cannabis
- 2024 Nevada Question 6
- 2024 Nevada Question 7
- 2026 Nevada Question 6
- 2026 Nevada Question 7

== See also ==
- Political party strength in Nevada
- Politics in Nevada
- Nevada Legislature
- None of These Candidates (voting option)
- List of United States senators from Nevada
- List of United States representatives from Nevada
- 2024 Nevada elections
- Women's suffrage in Nevada
