= List of governors of Nevada =

Governors from the Territory and State

Governor of Nevada
- Seal of Nevada

- Flag of Nevada

- Incumbent; Joe Lombardo since January 2, 2023
- Government of Nevada
- Style: Governor (informal); The Honorable (formal); His Excellency (courtesy)
- Status: Head of state Head of government
- Residence: Nevada Governor's Mansion
- Term length: Four years, renewable once
- Constituting instrument: Constitution of Nevada
- Precursor: Governor of the Nevada Territory
- Inaugural holder: Henry G. Blasdel
- Formation: December 5, 1864 (161 years ago)
- Succession: Line of succession
- Deputy: Lieutenant Governor of Nevada
- Salary: $163,474 (2022)
- Website: gov.nv.gov

The governor of Nevada is the head of government of the U.S. state of Nevada. The governor is the head of the executive branch of the Nevada state government. The governor is also the commander-in-chief of the state's military forces. The governor has a duty to enforce state laws and the power to either approve or veto bills passed by the Nevada Legislature, to convene the legislature at any time, as well as, except in cases of treason or impeachment, to grant pardons and reprieves.

The governor of Nevada serves a four-year term. An amendment in 1970 limits them to two terms, even if they are non-consecutive. The lieutenant governor of Nevada is not elected on the same ticket as the governor. Should there be a vacancy in the office of governor, the powers devolve onto the lieutenant governor.

The current governor is Republican Joe Lombardo, who took office on January 2, 2023.

== List of governors ==
=== Territory of Nevada ===
Nevada Territory was formed on March 2, 1861, from Utah Territory. It had only one governor appointed by the president of the United States before it became a state.

Before it was organized as a territory, a local convention in Genoa elected Isaac Roop provisional governor, taking office on December 15, 1859.

Governor of the Territory of Nevada
| Governor | Term in office | Appointed by |
|---|---|---|
| James W. Nye (1815–1876) | March 22, 1861 (Note: Nye was nominated on March 20, 1861; confirmed by the Senate on March 22; and arrived in the territory on July 8.) –– December 5, 1864 (1355 days; statehood) | Abraham Lincoln |

=== State of Nevada ===
Nevada was admitted to the Union on October 31, 1864. There have been thirty one governors since. The longest-serving governor was Bob Miller, who served two and a half terms from 1989 to 1999; the shortest-serving governor was Frank Bell, who acted as governor for the remaining four months of Charles C. Stevenson's term upon the governor's death. The current governor is Joe Lombardo, who took office on January 2, 2023.

Governors of the State of Nevada
| No. | Governor | Term in office | Party | Election | Lt. Governor (Note: Lieutenant governors represented the same party as their governor unless noted.) |
|---|---|---|---|---|---|
| 1 | Henry G. Blasdel (1825–1900) | December 5, 1864 – January 2, 1871 (2220 days; retired) | Republican | 1864 | John S. Crosman |
| 1 | Henry G. Blasdel (1825–1900) | December 5, 1864 – January 2, 1871 (2220 days; retired) | Republican | 1866 | James S. Slingerland |
| 2 | Lewis R. Bradley (1805–1879) | January 2, 1871 – January 7, 1879 (2928 days; lost election) | Democratic | 1870 | Frank Denver |
| 2 | Lewis R. Bradley (1805–1879) | January 2, 1871 – January 7, 1879 (2928 days; lost election) | Democratic | 1874 | Jewett W. Adams (Note: Represented the Democratic Party) |
| 3 | John Henry Kinkead (1826–1904) | January 7, 1879 – January 1, 1883 (1456 days; retired) | Republican | 1878 | Jewett W. Adams |
| 4 | Jewett W. Adams (1835–1920) | January 1, 1883 – January 3, 1887 (1464 days; lost election) | Democratic | 1882 | Charles E. Laughton (Note: Represented the Republican Party) |
| 5 | Charles C. Stevenson (1826–1890) | January 3, 1887 – September 21, 1890 (1358 days; died in office) | Republican | 1886 | Henry C. Davis (died) |
| 5 | Charles C. Stevenson (1826–1890) | January 3, 1887 – September 21, 1890 (1358 days; died in office) | Republican | 1886 | Samuel W. Chubbuck (resigned) |
| 5 | Charles C. Stevenson (1826–1890) | January 3, 1887 – September 21, 1890 (1358 days; died in office) | Republican | 1886 | Frank Bell |
| 6 | Frank Bell (1840–1927) | September 21, 1890 – January 5, 1891 (107 days; retired) | Republican | Lieutenant governor acting | Acting as governor |
| 7 | Roswell K. Colcord (1839–1939) | January 5, 1891 – January 8, 1895 (1465 days; retired) | Republican | 1890 | Joseph Poujade |
| 8 | John Edward Jones (1840–1896) | January 8, 1895 – April 10, 1896 (459 days; died in office) | Silver | 1894 | Reinhold Sadler |
| 9 | Reinhold Sadler (1848–1906) | April 10, 1896 – January 5, 1903 (2461 days; retired) | Silver | Lieutenant governor acting | Acting as governor |
| 9 | Reinhold Sadler (1848–1906) | April 10, 1896 – January 5, 1903 (2461 days; retired) | Silver | 1898 | James R. Judge |
| 10 | John Sparks (1843–1908) | January 5, 1903 – May 22, 1908 (1965 days; died in office) | Silver- Democratic | 1902 | Lemuel Allen |
| 10 | John Sparks (1843–1908) | January 5, 1903 – May 22, 1908 (1965 days; died in office) | Silver- Democratic | 1906 | Denver S. Dickerson |
| 11 | Denver S. Dickerson (1872–1925) | May 22, 1908 – January 2, 1911 (956 days; lost election) | Silver- Democratic | Lieutenant governor acting | Acting as governor |
| 12 | Tasker Oddie (1870–1950) | January 2, 1911 – January 4, 1915 (1464 days; lost election) | Republican | 1910 | Gilbert C. Ross |
| 13 | Emmet D. Boyle (1879–1926) | January 4, 1915 – January 1, 1923 (2920 days; retired) | Democratic | 1914 | Maurice J. Sullivan |
| 13 | Emmet D. Boyle (1879–1926) | January 4, 1915 – January 1, 1923 (2920 days; retired) | Democratic | 1918 | Maurice J. Sullivan |
| 14 | James G. Scrugham (1880–1945) | January 1, 1923 – January 3, 1927 (1464 days; lost election) | Democratic | 1922 | Maurice J. Sullivan |
| 15 | Fred B. Balzar (1880–1934) | January 3, 1927 – March 21, 1934 (2635 days; died in office) | Republican | 1926 | Morley Griswold |
| 15 | Fred B. Balzar (1880–1934) | January 3, 1927 – March 21, 1934 (2635 days; died in office) | Republican | 1930 | Morley Griswold |
| 16 | Morley Griswold (1890–1951) | March 21, 1934 – January 7, 1935 (293 days; lost election) | Republican | Lieutenant governor acting | Acting as governor |
| 17 | Richard Kirman Sr. (1877–1959) | January 7, 1935 – January 2, 1939 (1457 days; retired) | Democratic | 1934 | Fred S. Alward |
| 18 | Edward P. Carville (1885–1956) | January 2, 1939 – July 24, 1945 (2396 days; resigned) (Note: Carville resigned so that his successor would appoint him to the United States Senate.) | Democratic | 1938 | Maurice J. Sullivan |
| 18 | Edward P. Carville (1885–1956) | January 2, 1939 – July 24, 1945 (2396 days; resigned) | Democratic | 1942 | Vail Pittman |
| 19 | Vail Pittman (1880–1964) | July 24, 1945 – January 2, 1951 (1989 days; lost election) | Democratic | Lieutenant governor acting | Acting as governor |
| 19 | Vail Pittman (1880–1964) | July 24, 1945 – January 2, 1951 (1989 days; lost election) | Democratic | 1946 | Clifford A. Jones |
| 20 | Charles H. Russell (1903–1989) | January 2, 1951 – January 5, 1959 (2926 days; lost election) | Republican | 1950 | Clifford A. Jones |
| 20 | Charles H. Russell (1903–1989) | January 2, 1951 – January 5, 1959 (2926 days; lost election) | Republican | 1954 | Rex Bell (died July 4, 1962) |
| 21 | Grant Sawyer (1918–1996) | January 5, 1959 – January 2, 1967 (2920 days; lost election) | Democratic | 1958 | Rex Bell (died July 4, 1962) |
| 21 | Grant Sawyer (1918–1996) | January 5, 1959 – January 2, 1967 (2920 days; lost election) | Democratic | 1958 | Maude Frazier (appointed) |
| 21 | Grant Sawyer (1918–1996) | January 5, 1959 – January 2, 1967 (2920 days; lost election) | Democratic | 1962 | Paul Laxalt |
| 22 | Paul Laxalt (1922–2018) | January 2, 1967 – January 4, 1971 (1464 days; retired) | Republican | 1966 | Edward Fike |
| 23 | Mike O'Callaghan (1929–2004) | January 4, 1971 – January 1, 1979 (2920 days; term-limited) (Note: Under a 1970 amendment to the constitution, governors are ineligible to be elected more than twice.) | Democratic | 1970 | Harry Reid |
| 23 | Mike O'Callaghan (1929–2004) | January 4, 1971 – January 1, 1979 (2920 days; term-limited) | Democratic | 1974 | Robert E. Rose |
| 24 | Robert List (b. 1936) | January 1, 1979 – January 3, 1983 (1464 days; lost election) | Republican | 1978 | Myron E. Leavitt |
| 25 | Richard Bryan (b. 1937) | January 3, 1983 – January 3, 1989 (2193 days; resigned) (Note: Bryan resigned, having been elected to the United States Senate.) | Democratic | 1982 | Bob Cashell |
| 25 | Richard Bryan (b. 1937) | January 3, 1983 – January 3, 1989 (2193 days; resigned) | Democratic | 1986 | Bob Miller |
| 26 | Bob Miller (b. 1945) | January 3, 1989 – January 4, 1999 (3654 days; term-limited) | Democratic | Lieutenant governor acting | Acting as governor |
| 26 | Bob Miller (b. 1945) | January 3, 1989 – January 4, 1999 (3654 days; term-limited) | Democratic | 1990 | Sue Wagner |
| 26 | Bob Miller (b. 1945) | January 3, 1989 – January 4, 1999 (3654 days; term-limited) | Democratic | 1994 | Lonnie Hammargren |
| 27 | Kenny Guinn (1936–2010) | January 4, 1999 – January 1, 2007 (2920 days; term-limited) | Republican | 1998 | Lorraine Hunt |
| 27 | Kenny Guinn (1936–2010) | January 4, 1999 – January 1, 2007 (2920 days; term-limited) | Republican | 2002 | Lorraine Hunt |
| 28 | Jim Gibbons (b. 1944) | January 1, 2007 – January 3, 2011 (1464 days; lost nomination) | Republican | 2006 | Brian Krolicki |
| 29 | Brian Sandoval (b. 1963) | January 3, 2011 – January 7, 2019 (2927 days; term-limited) | Republican | 2010 | Brian Krolicki |
| 29 | Brian Sandoval (b. 1963) | January 3, 2011 – January 7, 2019 (2927 days; term-limited) | Republican | 2014 | Mark Hutchison |
| 30 | Steve Sisolak (b. 1953) | January 7, 2019 – January 2, 2023 (1457 days; lost election) | Democratic | 2018 | Kate Marshall (resigned September 17, 2021) |
| 30 | Steve Sisolak (b. 1953) | January 7, 2019 – January 2, 2023 (1457 days; lost election) | Democratic | 2018 | Vacant |
| 30 | Steve Sisolak (b. 1953) | January 7, 2019 – January 2, 2023 (1457 days; lost election) | Democratic | 2018 | Lisa Cano Burkhead (appointed December 16, 2021) |
| 31 | Joe Lombardo (b. 1962) | January 2, 2023 – Incumbent (Note: Lombardo's term will expire on January 4, 2027; he lost re-election on November 3, 2026.) (in office 1421 days) | Republican | 2022 | Stavros Anthony |
| 32 | Aaron Ford (b. 1972) | Governor-elect takes office January 4, 2027 | Democratic | 2026 | Sandra Jauregui |

== Timeline ==
Timeline of Nevada governors

== Electoral history (1950–) ==
| Year | Democratic nominee | | | Republican nominee | | | Independent candidate | | | Independent American nominee | | | Libertarian nominee | | | Green nominee | | | Other candidate | | | None of These Candidates | | |
| Year | Candidate | # | % | Candidate | # | % | Candidate | # | % | Candidate | # | % | Candidate | # | % | Candidate | # | % | Candidate | # | % | Candidate | # | % |
|---|---|---|---|---|---|---|---|---|---|---|---|---|---|---|---|---|---|---|---|---|---|---|---|---|
| 1950 | Vail Pittman | 26,164 | 42.36% | Charles H. Russell | 35,609 | 57.65% | – | | | – | | | – | | | – | | | – | | | – | | |
| 1954 | Vail Pittman | 36,797 | 46.90% | Charles H. Russell | 41,665 | 53.10% | – | | | – | | | – | | | – | | | – | | | – | | |
| 1958 | Grant Sawyer | 50,864 | 59.92% | Charles H. Russell | 34,025 | 40.08% | – | | | – | | | – | | | – | | | – | | | – | | |
| 1962 | Grant Sawyer | 64,784 | 66.84% | Oran K. Gragson | 32,145 | 33.16% | – | | | – | | | – | | | – | | | – | | | – | | |
| 1966 | Grant Sawyer | 65,870 | 47.84% | Paul Laxalt | 71,807 | 52.16% | – | | | – | | | – | | | – | | | – | | | – | | |
| 1970 | Mike O'Callaghan | 70,697 | 48.10% | Edward Fike | 64,400 | 43.81% | Charles E. Springer | 6,479 | 4.41% | Daniel M. Hansen | 5,415 | 3.68% | – | | | – | | | – | | | – | | |
| 1974 | Mike O'Callaghan | 114,114 | 67.38% | Shirley Crumpler | 28,959 | 17.10% | – | | | James Ray Houston | 26,285 | 15.52% | – | | | – | | | – | | | – | | |
| 1978 | Robert E. Rose | 76,361 | 39.68% | Robert List | 108,097 | 56.17% | – | | | Thomas F. Jefferson | 3,282 | 1.71% | John W. Grayson | 1,487 | 0.77% | – | | | – | | | None Of These; Candidates | 3,218 | 1.67% |
| 1982 | Richard Bryan | 128,132 | 53.44% | Robert List | 100,104 | 41.75% | – | | | – | | | Dan Becan | 4,621 | 1.93% | – | | | – | | | None Of These; Candidates | 6,894 | 2.88% |
| 1986 | Richard Bryan | 187,268 | 71.92% | Patricia Cafferata | 65,081 | 25.00% | – | | | – | | | Lou Tomburello | 2,555 | 0.98% | – | | | – | | | None Of These; Candidates | 5,471 | 2.10% |
| 1990 | Bob Miller | 207,878 | 64.81% | Jim Gallaway | 95,789 | 29.86% | – | | | – | | | James Frye | 8,059 | 2.51% | – | | | – | | | None Of These; Candidates | 9,017 | 2.81% |
| 1994 | Bob Miller | 200,026 | 52.68% | Jim Gibbons | 156,875 | 41.32% | – | | | Daniel M. Hansen | 10,012 | 2.64% | Denis Sholty | 3,978 | 1.05% | – | | | – | | | None Of These; Candidates | 8,785 | 2.31% |
| 1998 | Jan Jones Blackhurst | 182,281 | 42.04% | Kenny Guinn | 223,892 | 51.63% | – | | | Chuck Horne | 7,509 | 1.73% | Terry C. Savage | 7,307 | 1.69% | – | | | – | | | None Of These; Candidates | 12,641 | 2.92% |
| 2002 | Joe Neal | 110,935 | 22.01% | Kenny Guinn | 344,001 | 68.24% | Jerry L. Norton | 5,543 | 1.10% | David G. Holmgren | 7,047 | 1.40% | Dick Geyer | 8,104 | 1.61% | Charles Laws | 4,775 | 0.95% | – | | | None Of These; Candidates | 23,674 | 4.70% |
| 2006 | Dina Titus | 255,684 | 43.92% | Jim Gibbons | 279,003 | 47.93% | – | | | Christopher H. Hansen | 20,019 | 3.44% | – | | | Craig Bergland | 6,753 | 1.16% | – | | | None Of These; Candidates | 20,699 | 3.56% |
| 2010 | Rory Reid | 298,171 | 41.61% | Brian Sandoval | 382,350 | 53.56% | Eugene DiSimone | 6,403 | 0.89% | Floyd Fitzgibbons | 5,049 | 0.70% | Arthur F. Lampitt | 4,672 | 0.65% | David S. Curtis | 4,437 | 0.62% | Aaron Y. Honig | 3,216 | 0.45% | None Of These; Candidates | 12,231 | 1.71% |
| 2014 | Bob Goodman | 130,722 | 23.88% | Brian Sandoval | 386,340 | 70.58% | – | | | David L. VanDerBeek | 14,536 | 2.66% | – | | | – | | | – | | | None Of These; Candidates | 15,751 | 2.88% |
| 2018 | Steve Sisolak | 480,007 | 49.39% | Adam Laxalt | 440,320 | 45.31% | Ryan C. Bundy | 13,891 | 1.43% | Russell Best | 10,076 | 1.04% | Jared Lord | 8,640 | 0.89% | – | | | – | | | None Of These; Candidates | 18,865 | 1.94% |
| 2022 | Steve Sisolak | 481,991 | 47.30% | Joe Lombardo | 497,377 | 48.81% | – | | | Ed Bridges | 9,918 | 0.97% | Brandon Davis | 14,919 | 1.46% | – | | | – | | | None Of These; Candidates | 14,866 | 1.46% |

== See also ==
- Gubernatorial lines of succession in the United States § Nevada
- First ladies of Nevada
- Lieutenant Governor of Nevada
- List of Nevada state legislatures

== Sources ==
- "Former Nevada Governors". National Governors Association.
- "Nevada Constitution". State Democracy Research Initiative. University of Wisconsin Law School.
- Glashan, Roy R. (1979). American Governors and Gubernatorial Elections, 1775-1978. Meckler Books. ISBN 0-7201-1511-6 – via Internet Archive.
- Kallenbach, Joseph E.; Kallenbach, Jessamine S. (1977). American State Governors, 1776-1976. Oceana Publications. ISBN 978-0-379-00665-0 – via Internet Archive.
- McMullin, Thomas A.; Walker, David (1984). Biographical Directory of American Territorial Governors. Meckler Publishing. ISBN 0-930466-11-X – via Internet Archive.
- Mullaney, Marie Marmo (1994). Biographical Directory of the Governors of the United States, 1988–1994. Greenwood Publishing Group. ISBN 0-313-28312-5 – via Internet Archive.
- Sobel, Robert; Raimo, John (1978). Biographical Directory of the Governors of the United States, 1789-1978. Vol. 3. Meckler Books. ISBN 0-930466-01-2 – via Internet Archive.
- Thorpe, Francis Newton, ed. (1909). The Federal and State Constitutions, Colonial Charters, and Other Organic Laws of the States, Territories, and Colonies Now or Heretofore Forming the United States of America. Vol. 4. United States Government Publishing Office – via Internet Archive.
