= Grant Sawyer =

American politician (1918–1996)

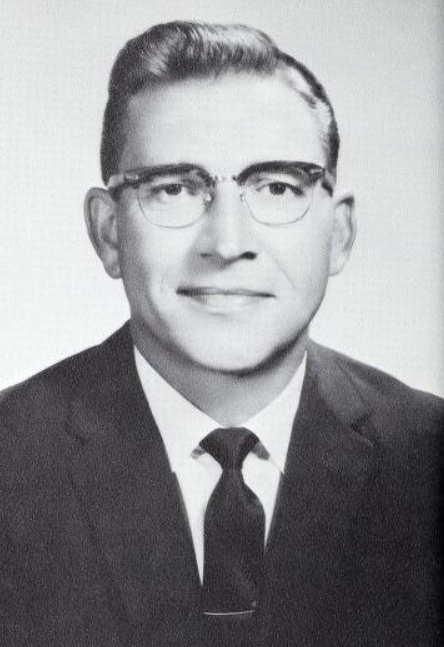

Chair of the National Governors Association
- In office June 6, 1964 – July 25, 1965
- Preceded by: John Anderson Jr.
- Succeeded by: John H. Reed

21st Governor of Nevada
- In office January 5, 1959 – January 2, 1967
- Lieutenant: Rex Bell; Maude Frazier; Paul Laxalt
- Preceded by: Charles H. Russell
- Succeeded by: Paul Laxalt

Personal details
- Born: Frank Grant Sawyer; December 14, 1918 Twin Falls, Idaho, U.S.
- Died: February 19, 1996 (aged 77) Las Vegas, Nevada, U.S.
- Resting place: Palm Memorial Park, Las Vegas, Nevada, U.S.
- Party: Democratic
- Spouse: Bette Hoge
- Education: Linfield College; University of Nevada, Reno (BA); George Washington University; Georgetown University (LLB)

Frank Grant Sawyer (December 14, 1918 – February 19, 1996) was an American attorney and politician who served as the 21st governor of Nevada from 1959 to 1967. He was a member of the Democratic Party.

== Early life ==
Sawyer was born on December 14, 1918, in Twin Falls, Idaho. He was the son of two osteopaths, Harry William and Bula Belle Cameron Sawyer. Sawyer's father was also a state legislator in Nevada.

Sawyer served in the U.S. Army during World War II. He married Bette Norene Hoge on August 1, 1946.

== Education ==
Sawyer attended Linfield College for two years and later enrolled at the University of Nevada, Reno, where he graduated in 1941. While a student at Nevada, Sawyer was a member of the Alpha Tau Omega fraternity. Sawyer then went to George Washington University Law School but left to enlist in the army at the beginning of World War II. After his military service he enrolled at Georgetown University, where he received a law degree in 1946.

== Political career ==
He served as District Attorney for Elko County, Nevada from 1950 to 1958. Sawyer served as the governor of Nevada from 1959 to 1967. He was defeated in his attempt at a third term by Paul Laxalt.

Governor Sawyer worked to push through civil rights policies and legislation, a difficult process in a state that had been accused of being "the Mississippi of the West."

He was responsible for the development of the modern casino regulatory system with the passage of the Gaming Control Act of 1959 and the formation of the Nevada Gaming Commission. Sawyer swam against the tide of history when he unsuccessfully fought to prevent corporate ownership over Nevada casinos.

Sawyer was the first western governor to endorse the fledgling presidential campaign of Massachusetts Senator John F. Kennedy in 1960.

Commentators have reflected on Sawyer's career as follows: Grant Sawyer served two turbulent terms as Nevada's governor from 1959 to 1967. Sawyer was an advocate of progressive change. By the late fifties he had come so far from his start in the conservative political machine of Senator Patrick McCarran that many powerful Nevadans considered his policies on education, the environment, and civil rights to be dangerously radical. When he demanded meaningful regulatory control over casino gaming and took decisive action to purge the industry of its mob connections, the establishment's resistance stiffened. Eventually, Sawyer's positions brought him into open conflict with special interests and led to a collision with the justice department of the federal government, but he never backed down.

== Later years and death ==
In 1967, Sawyer co-founded Lionel Sawyer & Collins. For many years, this was the largest private law firm in Nevada. The firm ceased operations on December 31, 2014, with nineteen of its lawyers joining Fennemore Craig.

Sawyer died on February 19, 1996, in Las Vegas, Nevada of complications of a debilitating stroke suffered in 1993, at the age of 77. His wife Bette, a native of Baker City, Oregon, died on September 11, 2002, at the age of 79. They are both interred inside the Lakeview Mausoleum at the Palm Memorial Park on Eastern Avenue in Las Vegas, Nevada.

== Legacy ==
The following facilities are named for the former governor:

- The Grant Sawyer Building, a state office building, located at 555 East Washington Avenue, Las Vegas
- Grant Sawyer Middle School, located at 5450 Redwood Street, Las Vegas
- The Grant Sawyer Center for Justice Studies, part of the School of Social Research and Justice Studies at the University of Nevada, Reno

Party political offices
Preceded by Vail M. Pittman	Democratic nominee for Governor of Nevada; 1958, 1962, 1966	Succeeded by Mike O'Callaghan
Political offices
Preceded by Charles H. Russell	Governor of Nevada; 1959–1967	Succeeded by Paul Laxalt
Preceded by John Anderson Jr.	Chair of the National Governors Association; 1964–1965	Succeeded by John H. Reed
