= Vail Pittman =

American politician (1880–1964)

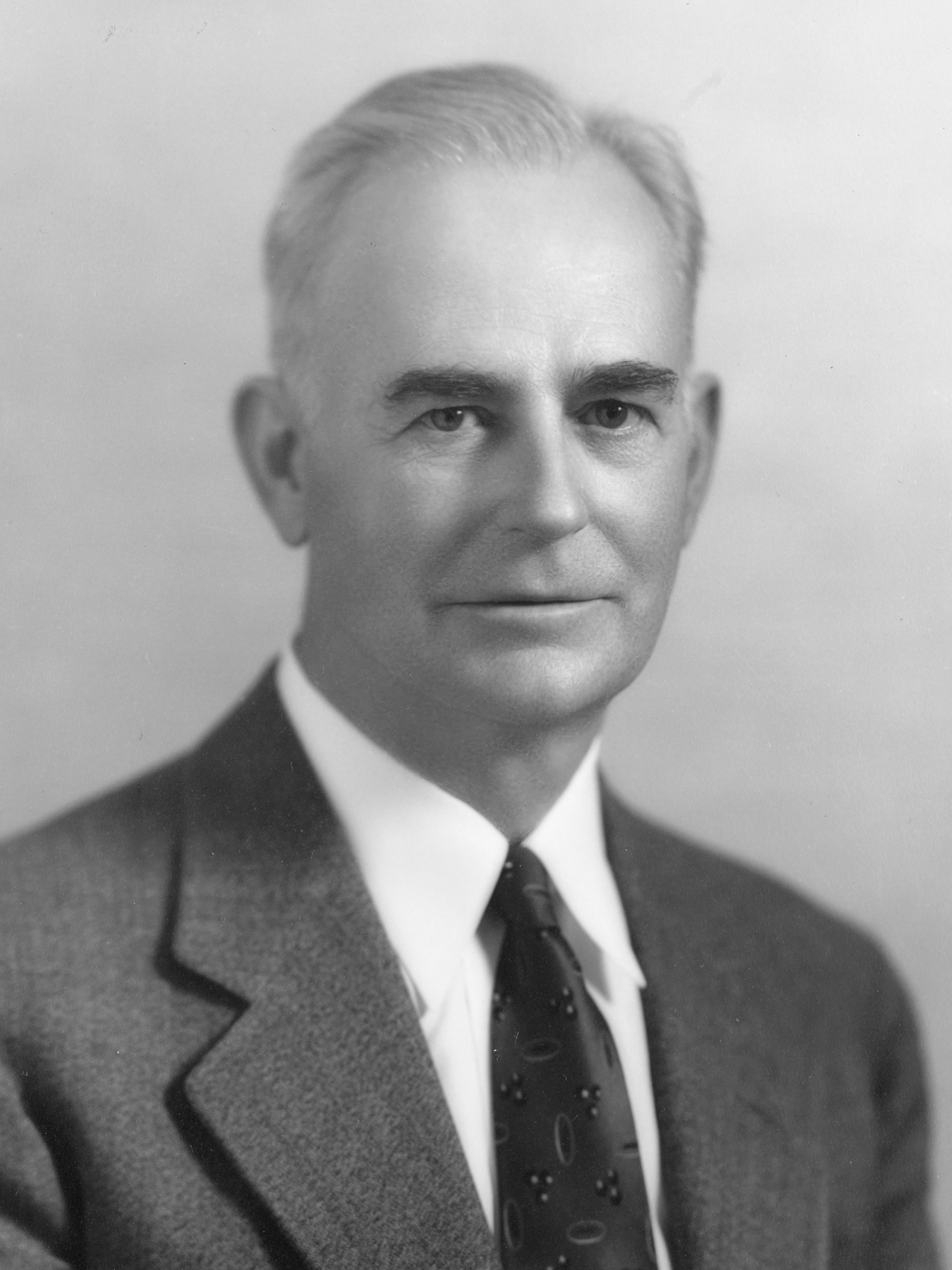
- Pittman c. 1940s

19th Governor of Nevada
- In office July 24, 1945 – January 1, 1951
- Lieutenant: Clifford A. Jones
- Preceded by: Edward P. Carville
- Succeeded by: Charles H. Russell

19th Lieutenant Governor of Nevada
- In office January 3, 1943 – July 24, 1945
- Governor: Edward P. Carville
- Preceded by: Maurice J. Sullivan
- Succeeded by: Clifford A. Jones

Member of the Nevada Senate
- In office 1925–1929

Personal details
- Born: Vail Montgomery Pittman; September 17, 1880 Vicksburg, Mississippi, U.S.
- Died: January 29, 1964 (aged 83) San Francisco, California, U.S.
- Resting place: Masonic Memorial Gardens; Reno, Nevada, U.S.
- Party: Democratic
- Spouse: Ida Louise Brewington
- Education: University of the South; Brown's Business College

Vail Montgomery Pittman (September 17, 1880 (Note: Vail's birth year is given in various sources as 1880, 1881, and 1883. However, his mother, Catherine (Key) Pittman, died on January 4, 1881, so only the earliest date is tenable.) – January 29, 1964) was an American businessman and politician. A member of the Democratic Party, he served as the 19th governor of Nevada.

== Biography ==
Pittman was born in Vicksburg, Mississippi, the youngest of four sons born to William Buckner Pittman and Katherine Key Pittman, a direct descendant of Francis Scott Key. His siblings included Key Pittman, a longtime United States Senator from Nevada. William and Katherine Pittman died when Vail Pittman was an infant, and the Pittmans were raised in Lake Providence, Louisiana, by their uncle and aunt, Mr. and Mrs. Vail Montgomery. Vail Pittman was educated by private tutors and in the public schools until he attended Sewanee Military Academy. He then attended the University of the South and Brown's Business College, but returned to Lake Providence in 1903 to manage the family cotton plantation after Vail Montgomery's death.

== Career ==
Pittman moved to Tonopah, Nevada, in 1904, and worked initially at the Tonopah-Goldfield Lumber and Coal Company until purchasing the company's coal business and operating it as a separate company. He sold the coal business in 1907, and subsequently engaged in a variety of occupations, including undersheriff of Nye County, sergeant-at-arms of the Nevada Senate, and partner in a mining company. On May 20, 1919, he married Ida Louise Brewington. In 1920 Vail and Ida Pittman bought the Ely Daily Times of Ely, Nevada, and he began a successful career in the newspaper business. Pittman was also involved in several civic and business organizations, including the good roads movement and the local chamber of commerce. From 1925 to 1929 Pittman served in the Nevada Senate. After his brother Key's 1940 death, Vail Pittman unsuccessfully sought the governor's appointment to his U.S. Senate seat.

Pittman was elected the 19th lieutenant governor of Nevada in 1942. He was a candidate in the Democratic primary for United States Senate in 1944, but was defeated by the incumbent, Pat McCarran. He became governor when Edward P. Carville resigned in 1945 to accept appointment to a vacant U.S. Senate seat. Pittman was elected to a full term in 1946, and served until 1951. He was an unsuccessful candidate for reelection in 1950 and in 1954, losing both times to Charles H. Russell. After leaving office Pittman resumed operation of the Ely Daily Times. He later sold the newspaper, and became an officer of the Nevada Savings and Loan Association and the Nevada State Bank. He was involved in the Rotary Club and was a delegate to international conferences in Switzerland and Japan. He served as a delegate to the 1956 and 1960 Democratic National Conventions.

== Death ==
Pittman died from cancer on January 29, 1964, in a hospital in San Francisco, California at the age of 83. He is interred at Masonic Memorial Gardens, Reno, Washoe County, Nevada, US.

== Notes ==
Party political offices
Preceded by Edward P. Carville	Democratic nominee for Governor of Nevada; 1946, 1950, 1954	Succeeded by Grant Sawyer
Political offices
Preceded by Edward P. Carville	Governor of Nevada; 1945 – 1951	Succeeded by Charles H. Russell
Preceded by Maurice J. Sullivan	Lieutenant Governor of Nevada; 1943 – 1945	Succeeded by Clifford A. Jones
