= 2017 Henderson, Nevada mayoral election =

Henderson mayoral election, 2017
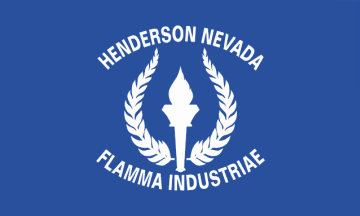
- April 4, 2017
- Turnout: 12.46%
Candidate	Debra March	Rick Workman
Party	Nonpartisan	Nonpartisan
Popular vote	11,367	7,380
Percentage	55.04%	35.74%
Mayor before election
Andy Hafen
Elected mayor
Debra March
Democratic

The 2017 Henderson mayoral election was held on April 4, 2017, to elect the mayor of Henderson, Nevada. It saw the election of Democrat Debra March.

== Results ==
Results
Candidate	Votes	%
Debra March	11,367	55.04
Rick Worman	7,380	35.74
Crystal Hendrickson	714	3.46
Angelo R. Gomez	370	1.79
Eddie "Swamper" Hamilton	305	1.48
Anthony S. Csuzi	266	1.29
Jerry Sakura	250	1.21
Total votes	20,652	
