= Charles H. Russell =

American politician (1903–1989)

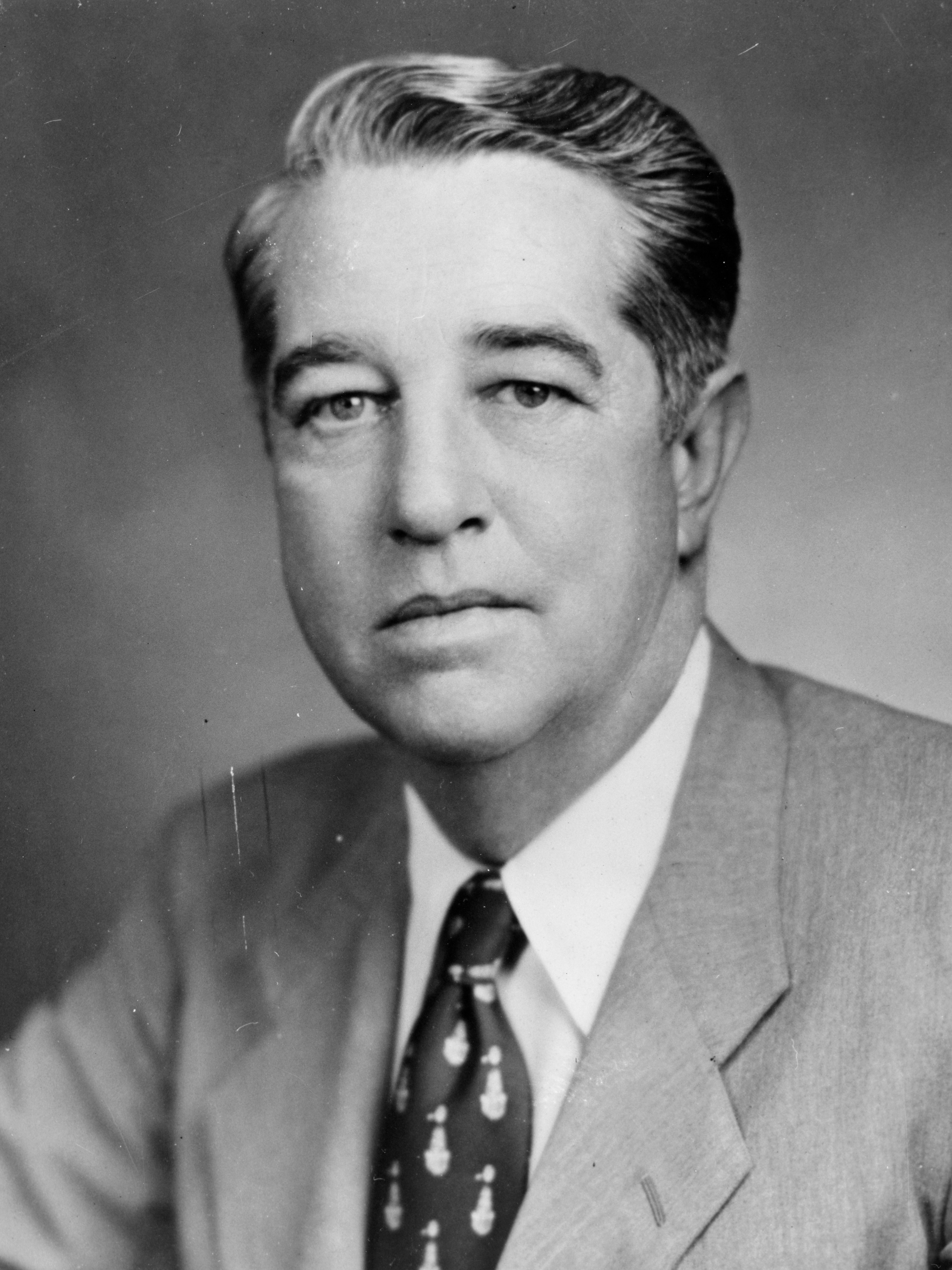
- Russell c. 1951–1958

20th Governor of Nevada
- In office January 1, 1951 – January 5, 1959
- Lieutenant: Clifford A. Jones; Rex Bell
- Preceded by: Vail Pittman
- Succeeded by: Grant Sawyer

Member of the U.S. House of Representatives from Nevada's at-large district
- In office January 3, 1947 – January 3, 1949
- Preceded by: Berkeley L. Bunker
- Succeeded by: Walter S. Baring Jr.

Member of the Nevada Senate
- In office 1941–1946

Personal details
- Born: Charles Hinton Russell; December 27, 1903 Lovelock, Nevada, U.S.
- Died: September 13, 1989 (aged 85) Carson City, Nevada, U.S.
- Resting place: Dayton Cemetery; Dayton, Nevada, U.S.
- Party: Republican
- Spouse: Marjorie Ann Guild
- Profession: Politician

Charles Hinton Russell (December 27, 1903 – September 13, 1989) was an American politician who served as the 20th governor of Nevada. He was a member of the Republican Party.

== Biography ==
Russell was born on December 27, 1903, in Lovelock, Nevada. He graduated from the University of Nevada in 1926. He taught school in Ruby Valley for one term and then went to Ruth to work for the copper company. He was the editor of the Ely Record for seventeen years, beginning in 1929.

== Political career ==
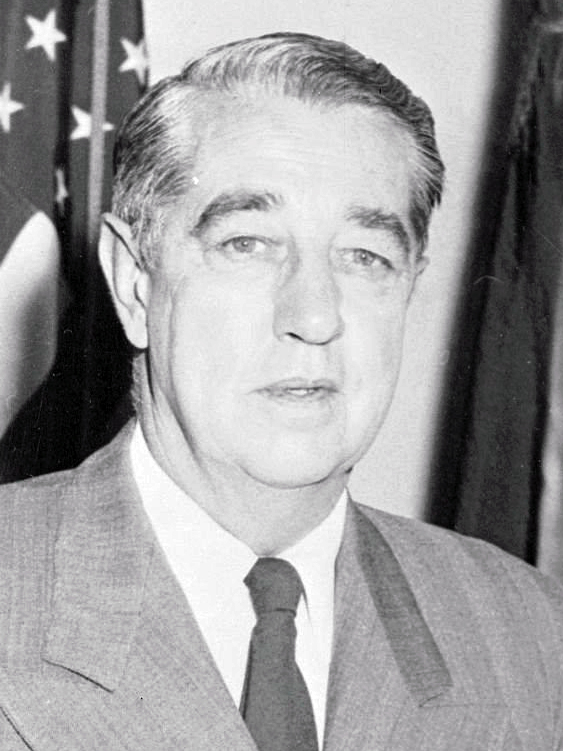
Russell in 1954, the same year he was reelected as Governor.

Russell was a member of the Nevada state House from 1935 to 1941 and the state Senate from 1941 to 1946. After that, he was elected as a Republican to the Eightieth Congress, succeeding Democrat Berkeley L. Bunker, who ran unsuccessfully for the U. S. Senate. Apart from the perpetual Nevada issue of the monetization of silver, the fight, sort of, was over Labor. Russell's primary opponent was very anti-Labor, but the general election candidates both tried to straddle the issue. Between mining and the growing tourist industry, the state had a significant Labor constituency in opposition to the conservatism of its ranching substratum. He was an unsuccessful candidate for reelection in 1948 to the Eighty-first Congress, narrowly losing to Reno City Councilman Walter S. Baring in large part because he voted for the Taft-Hartley Act. Russell was elected Nevada Governor in 1951 and signed into law SB79, which made Nevada into a right-to-work state. He left office in 1959.

== Death ==
Russell died on September 13, 1989, in Carson City, Nevada, at the age of 85. He is interred at the Dayton Cemetery in Dayton, Nevada.

Party political offices
Preceded by Melvin E. Jepson	Republican nominee for Governor of Nevada; 1950, 1954, 1958	Succeeded by Oran K. Gragson
Political offices
Preceded by Vail M. Pittman	Governor of Nevada; January 1, 1951 – January 5, 1959	Succeeded by Grant Sawyer
U.S. House of Representatives
Preceded by Berkeley L. Bunker	Member of the U.S. House of Representatives from Nevada's at-large congressional district January 3, 1947 – January 3, 1949	Succeeded by Walter S. Baring Jr.
