= Clifford A. Jones =

American politician

20th Lieutenant Governor of Nevada
- In office January 1947 – December 1954
- Governor: Vail M. Pittman; Charles H. Russell
- Preceded by: Vail M. Pittman
- Succeeded by: Rex Bell

Member of the Nevada State Assembly

Personal details
- Born: February 19, 1912; Long Lane, Missouri
- Died: November 16, 2001 (aged 89); Las Vegas, Nevada
- Political party: Democratic

Military service
- Allegiance: United States
- Branch/service: United States Army
- Rank: Lieutenant Colonel
- Unit: Third; Ninth Armies
- Battles/wars: World War II

Clifford Aaron Jones, Sr. (February 19, 1912 – November 16, 2001) was an American politician. He was the 20th lieutenant governor of Nevada from January 1947 to December 1954.

Clifford A. Jones was also the founder of the Jones, Jones, Close & Brown branch of the one of Nevada's legendary law firms, today known as Jones Vargas.

Cliff Jones was born in Long Lane, Missouri. His family moved to Las Vegas in 1931 while Cliff was in college at the University of Missouri. When they weren't attending school, both Cliff and his younger brother, Herbert M. Jones, worked on the construction of Boulder Dam in the 1930s, working their way up from servers at the Anderson mess hall to various jobs including mucker, puddler, signalman, crane operator and power hose operator.

While an undergraduate, Cliff took classes at the University of Missouri School of Law, with the result that Cliff had accumulated three years of law school credits before he actually graduated from law school. This qualified Cliff to sit for the Nevada bar exam during his final semester of law school. Consequently, in the winter of 1937, Cliff traveled from Columbia, Missouri to Carson City and took the exam. He was notified later that semester that he had passed.

Cliff returned to law school and completed his studies and graduated in the spring of 1938. He returned home to Las Vegas and was sworn in as an attorney, one of only five newly admitted attorneys in Nevada that year. He immediately entered private practice.

During the years before World War II, Cliff entered Nevada politics. In the 1940 election, he was elected to the Nevada Assembly and became its majority leader and chairman of the Judiciary Committee.

During World War II, Cliff was commissioned as an officer in the United States Army. He served in the European theater, in the Third and Ninth Armies, earning four battle stars (a service award, not combat) and a Bronze Star Medal for merit with an oak leaf cluster denoting an additional award. He saw no combat. By the war's end, he was discharged as a lieutenant colonel.

Cliff returned home in 1945. Later that year, he was appointed as a District Judge for Clark County, a position he held only one year. In 1946, Cliff ran for and was elected the State's Lieutenant Governor, an office he held for two terms, from January 1947 to December 1954, when a scandal forced his resignation. Cliff was a highly successful politician with wide ranging interests and influence during these years. In political circles he was known as "Big Juice" for his political influence.

Cliff Jones returned to his law practice and never held public office again. He was a businessman with wide ranging interests. He founded the first ready mix concrete company in southern Nevada, and he helped found Valley Bank of Nevada. At various times he had been given interests in casinos by people he had helped, including the El Cortez, the Algiers Hotel, The Dunes, Golden Nugget, Pioneer, Thunderbird and Westerner, plus international properties in France, Lebanon and Ecuador.

In 1969, a merger created the firm of Jones, Jones, Close, Bilbray & Kaufman, Ltd. This entity is one of the two direct predecessors in the firm known today as Jones Vargas.

Cliff Jones was instrumental in the founding of the Bank of Las Vegas which later became Valley Bank of Nevada, one of the few banks in this time period to make loans to Nevada casinos.

In early 1993 Clifford A. Jones retired, closing out a career that spanned 55 years. In November 2001 he died at the age of 89.

The scandal that caused him to retire from political office is discussed in Chapter VII of “The Green Felt Jungle” (1963).

== Bibliography ==
Denton, Ralph, A Liberal Conscience, From Interviews with Michael S. Green, University of Nevada Las Vegas Oral History Program, 2001.

Jones, Herbert M., Informal History of Jones, Jones, Close & Brown, Chartered, Unpublished Notes, 2001.

Jones Vargas Chartered, Corporate Records, 1969–2007.

Jones Vargas History, used in internal documents, written primarily by Jones Vargas stockholder, Albert F. Pagni, 2002.

Neff, Erin, "Political, Business Leader Jones Dies at 89", Article, Las Vegas Sun, November 19, 2001 (obtained from the Las Vegas Sun website, October 17, 2007).

Nevada Legislators, 1861 to 2007, Nevada Legislature, Research Division, (online version), October 18, 2007.

Nevada State Legislature Fact Sheet, State of Nevada, (online version), 2007.

Political History of Nevada, Tenth Edition, Nevada State Library and Archives, (online version), originally published, 1996.

State Law Resources, Inc. (On-line document), History of Jones Vargas, November 1, 2007.

U. S. Census Abstracts, (online version), 1920-1950.

Political offices
Preceded by Vail M. Pittman	Lieutenant Governor of Nevada; 1947–1955	Succeeded by Rex Bell
