= 1994 Nevada gubernatorial election =

- November 8, 1994
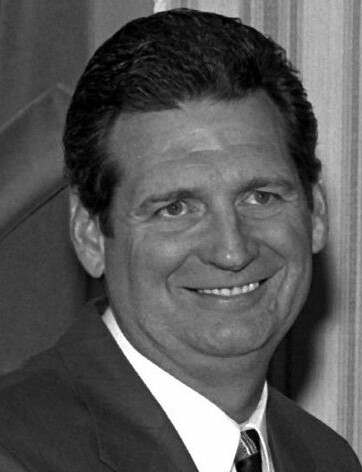

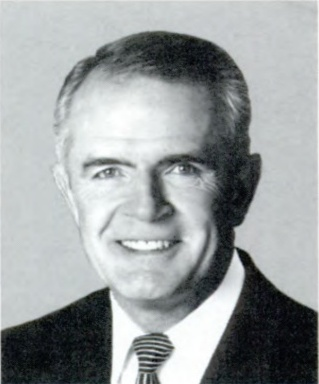
Nominee	Bob Miller	Jim Gibbons
Party	Democratic	Republican
Popular vote	200,026	156,875
Percentage	52.68%	41.32%
- County results Miller: 40–50% 50–60% Gibbons: 40–50% 50–60% 60–70%
Governor before election
Bob Miller
Democratic
Elected Governor
Bob Miller
Democratic

The 1994 Nevada gubernatorial election took place on November 8, 1994. Incumbent Democrat Bob Miller won re-election to a second term, defeating Republican nominee Jim Gibbons (who would later go on to narrowly win the governorship in 2006).

This was the last time a Democrat was elected Governor of Nevada until Steve Sisolak's victory in 2018, the last time a Democratic candidate received over 50% of the vote until 2026, and the last time a Democratic governor in Nevada has won re-election. As of 2025, this is also the last time that a gubernatorial nominee and a lieutenant gubernatorial nominee of different political parties were elected in Nevada respectively. This was the first Nevada gubernatorial election since 1962 in which the winner was of the same party as the incumbent president.

== Democratic primary ==
=== Candidate ===
- Bob Miller, incumbent Governor of Nevada
- Janis Lyle Laverty, incumbent Mayor of Las Vegas
- Rhinestone Cowboy
- Samuel F. Bull, perennial candidate
- Thomas Gaule
- Carlo Poliak, sanitation worker and frequent candidate

=== Results ===
Democratic primary results
Party	Candidate	Votes	%
Democratic	Bob Miller (incumbent)	75,311	62.66%
Democratic	Jan Laverty Jones	33,566	27.93%
	None of These Candidates	6,917	5.76%
Democratic	Rhinestone Cowboy	1,317	1.10%
Democratic	Samuel F. Bull	1,234	1.03%
Democratic	Thomas Gaule	1,031	0.86%
Democratic	Carlo Poliak	810	0.67%
Total votes		120,186	100.00%

== Republican primary ==
=== Candidate ===
- Jim Gibbons, state assemblyman
- Cheryl Lau, current secretary of state
- Edward E. "Ned" Eyre Jr., perennial candidate
- Ken Santor, state treasurer
- Hilary "Sir" Michael Milko
- Suzanne Nounna

=== Results ===
Republican Primary results
Party	Candidate	Votes	%
Republican	Jim Gibbons	59,705	51.15%
Republican	Cheryl Lau	37,749	32.34%
	None of These Candidates	10,391	8.90%
Republican	Edward "Ned" Eyre Jr.	4,066	3.48%
Republican	Ken Santor	2,549	2.18%
Republican	Hilary Michael Milko	1,247	1.07%
Republican	Suzanne Nounna	1,015	0.87%
Total votes		127,952	100.00%

== General election ==
=== Candidates ===
- Bob Miller (D), incumbent Governor of Nevada
- Jim Gibbons (R), state assemblyman
- Daniel Hansen (IA)
- Denis Sholty (L)

=== Results ===
Nevada gubernatorial election, 1994
Party	Candidate	Votes	%	±%
Democratic	Bob Miller (incumbent)	200,026	52.68%	−12.13%
Republican	Jim Gibbons	156,875	41.32%	+11.45%
Independent American	Daniel Hansen	10,012	2.64%	+2.64%
	None of These Candidates	8,785	2.31%	−0.50%
Libertarian	Denis Sholty	3,978	1.05%	−1.46%
Majority		112,089	34.95%	
Total votes		379,676	100.00%	
Democratic hold		Swing	-23.58%	

=== County results ===
County	Bob Miller Democratic		Jim Gibbons Republican		Daniel Hansen Independent American		None of These Candidates		Denis Sholty Libertarian		Margin		Total votes cast
County	#	%	#	%	#	%	#	%	#	%	#	%	Total votes cast
Carson City	7,191	44.22%	8,168	50.23%	325	2.00%	473	2.91%	104	0.64%	-977	-6.01%	16,261
Churchill	2,857	41.77%	3,524	51.52%	268	3.92%	153	2.24%	38	0.56%	-667	-9.75%	6,840
Clark	125,231	58.36%	76,984	35.88%	4,700	2.19%	5,249	2.45%	2,415	1.13%	48,247	22.48%	214,579
Douglas	6,211	46.20%	6,596	49.06%	291	2.16%	2.36	1.76%	110	0.82%	-385	-2.86%	13,444
Elko	2,920	29.43%	6,080	61.28%	566	5.70%	238	2.40%	118	1.19%	-3,160	-31.85%	9,922
Esmeralda	170	31.89%	309	57.97%	19	3.56%	20	3.75%	15	2.81%	-139	-26.08%	533
Eureka	192	29.31%	401	61.22%	31	4.73%	25	3.82%	6	0.92%	-209	-31.91%	655
Humboldt	1,746	40.51%	2,265	52.55%	162	3.76%	115	2.67%	22	0.51%	-519	-12.04%	4,310
Lander	729	34.53%	1,172	55.52%	142	6.73%	52	2.46%	16	0.76%	-443	-20.99%	2,111
Lincoln	525	28.56%	1,056	57.45%	147	8.00%	92	5.01%	18	0.98%	-531	-28.89%	1,838
Lyon	3,779	45.83%	3,915	47.48%	328	3.98%	156	1.89%	68	0.82%	-136	-1.65%	8,246
Mineral	1,346	55.21%	931	38.19%	79	3.24%	66	2.71%	16	0.66%	415	17.02%	2,438
Nye	2,819	39.96%	3,410	48.33%	389	5.51%	188	2.66%	249	3.53%	-591	-8.38%	7,055
Pershing	605	40.77%	769	51.82%	59	3.98%	45	3.03%	6	0.40%	-164	-11.05%	1,484
Storey	807	50.16%	695	43.19%	47	2.92%	39	2.42%	21	1.31%	112	6.96%	1,609
Washoe	41,694	48.97%	38,925	45.72%	2,251	2.64%	1,536	1.80%	732	0.86%	2,769	3.25%	85,138
White Pine	1,204	37.47%	1,675	52.13%	208	6.47%	102	3.17%	24	0.75%	-471	-14.66%	3,213
Totals	200,026	52.68%	156,875	41.32%	10,012	2.64%	8,785	2.31%	3,978	1.05%	43,151	11.37%	379,676

==== Counties that flipped from Democratic to Republican ====
- Carson City
- Churchill
- Douglas
- Elko
- Esmeralda
- Eureka
- Humboldt
- Lander
- Lincoln
- Lyon
- Nye
- Pershing
- White Pine
