= 1958 Nevada gubernatorial election =

- November 4, 1958
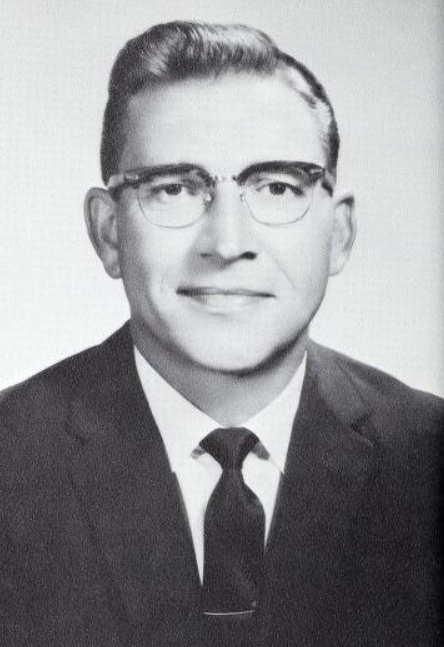

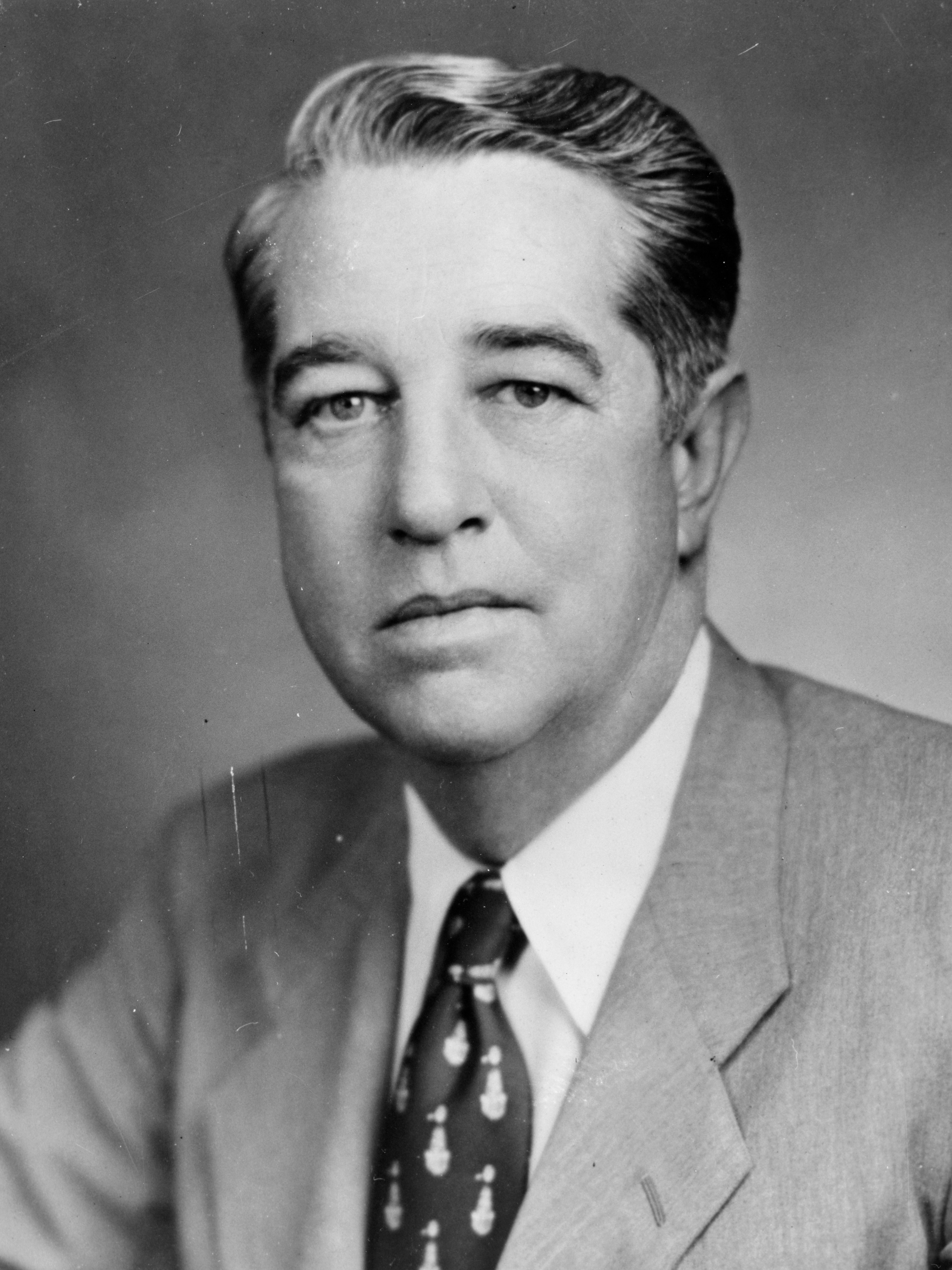
Nominee	Grant Sawyer	Charles H. Russell
Party	Democratic	Republican
Popular vote	50,864	34,025
Percentage	59.92%	40.08%
- County results Sawyer: 50–60% 60–70% 70–80% Russell: 50–60% 60–70%
Governor before election
Charles H. Russell
Republican
Elected Governor
Grant Sawyer
Democratic

The 1958 Nevada gubernatorial election was held on November 4, 1958. Incumbent Republican Charles H. Russell ran unsuccessfully for re-election to a third term as Governor of Nevada. He was defeated by Democratic nominee Grant Sawyer with 59.92% of the vote.

== Primary elections ==
Primary elections were held on September 2, 1958.

=== Democratic primary ===
==== Candidates ====
- Grant Sawyer, Elko County District Attorney
- Harvey Dickerson, Nevada Attorney General
- George E. Franklin Jr.
- William Richard Pate

==== Results ====
Democratic primary results
Party	Candidate	Votes	%
Democratic	Grant Sawyer	20,711	46.30
Democratic	Harvey Dickerson	13,372	29.89
Democratic	George E. Franklin Jr.	10,175	22.75
Democratic	William Richard Pate	473	1.06
Total votes		44,731	100.00

== General election ==
=== Candidates ===
- Grant Sawyer, Democratic
- Charles H. Russell, Republican

=== Results ===
1958 Nevada gubernatorial election
Party	Candidate	Votes	%	±%
Democratic	Grant Sawyer	50,864	59.92%	+13.02%
Republican	Charles H. Russell (inc.)	34,025	40.08%	−13.02%
Majority		16,839	19.84%	
Total votes		84,889	100.00%	
Democratic gain from Republican		Swing	26.04%	

=== Results by county ===
County	Grant Sawyer Democratic		Charles H. Russell Republican		Margin		Total votes cast
County	#	%	#	%	#	%	Total votes cast
Churchill	1,532	54.12%	1,299	45.88%	233	8.23%	2,831
Clark	20,688	69.48%	9,087	30.52%	11,601	38.96%	29,775
Douglas	547	39.49%	838	60.51%	-291	-21.01%	1,385
Elko	2,533	58.85%	1,771	41.15%	762	17.70%	4,304
Esmeralda	184	55.76%	146	44.24%	38	11.52%	330
Eureka	308	63.90%	174	36.10%	134	27.80%	482
Humboldt	1,293	66.51%	651	33.49%	642	33.02%	1,944
Lander	493	59.40%	337	40.60%	156	18.80%	830
Lincoln	998	76.95%	299	23.05%	699	53.89%	1,297
Lyon	1,258	54.84%	1,036	45.16%	222	9.68%	2,294
Mineral	1,577	60.86%	1,014	39.14%	563	21.73%	2,591
Nye	1,035	60.92%	664	39.08%	371	21.84%	1,699
Ormsby	1,292	45.62%	1,540	54.38%	-248	-8.76%	2,832
Pershing	824	59.49%	561	40.51%	263	18.99%	1,385
Storey	222	58.58%	157	41.42%	65	17.15%	379
Washoe	13,232	49.80%	13,339	50.20%	-107	-0.40%	26,571
White Pine	2,848	71.92%	1,112	28.08%	1,736	43.84%	3,960
Totals	50,864	59.92%	34,025	40.08%	16,839	19.84%	84,889

==== Counties that flipped from Republican to Democratic ====
- Churchill
- Elko
- Esmeralda
- Eureka
- Humboldt
- Lander
- Lyon
- Nye
- Pershing
- Storey
