= 1882 Nevada gubernatorial election =

- November 7, 1882
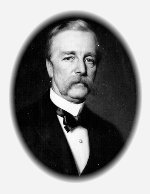

Nominee	Jewett W. Adams	Enoch Strother
Party	Democratic	Republican
Popular vote	7,770	6,535
Percentage	54.32%	45.68%
- County results Adams: 50–60% 60–70% Strother: 50–60% No Vote/Data
Governor before election
John Henry Kinkead
Republican
Elected Governor
Jewett W. Adams
Democratic

The 1882 Nevada gubernatorial election was held in the U.S. state on November 7, 1882.

Lieutenant Governor Jewett W. Adams defeated Republican nominee Enoch Strother with 54.32% of the vote.

== General election ==
=== Candidates ===
Major party candidates

- Jewett W. Adams, Democratic, incumbent Lieutenant Governor
- Enoch Strother, Republican, businessman and register in bankruptcy

=== Results ===
1882 Nevada gubernatorial election
Party	Candidate	Votes	%	±%
Democratic	Jewett W. Adams	7,770	54.32%	+5.62%
Republican	Enoch Strother	6,535	45.68%	−5.62%
Majority		1,235	8.64%	
Total votes		14,305	100.00%	
Democratic gain from Republican		Swing	+11.24%	

=== Results by county ===
County	Jewett W. Adams Democratic		Enoch Strother Republican		Margin		Total votes cast
County	#	%	#	%	#	%	Total votes cast
Churchill	85	52.47%	77	47.53%	8	4.94%	162
Douglas	295	59.72%	199	40.28%	96	19.43%	494
Elko	778	54.75%	643	45.25%	135	9.50%	1,421
Esmeralda	623	49.92%	625	50.08%	-2	-0.16%	1,248
Eureka	1,028	57.40%	763	42.60%	265	14.80%	1,791
Humboldt	487	61.26%	308	38.74%	179	22.52%	795
Lander	539	54.61%	448	45.39%	91	9.22%	987
Lincoln	389	63.88%	220	36.12%	169	27.75%	609
Lyon	235	52.57%	212	47.43%	23	5.15%	447
Nye	323	57.58%	238	42.42%	85	15.15%	561
Ormsby	449	51.37%	425	48.63%	24	2.75%	874
Storey	1,509	52.12%	1,386	47.88%	123	4.25%	2,895
Washoe	605	48.36%	646	51.64%	-41	-3.28%	1,251
White Pine	425	55.19%	345	44.81%	80	10.39%	770
Totals	7,770	54.32%	6,535	45.68%	1,235	8.63%	14,305

==== Counties that flipped from Republican to Democratic ====
- Douglas
- Eureka
- Humboldt
- Lyon
- Ormsby
- Storey

==== Counties that flipped from Democratic to Republican ====
- Esmeralda
