= 1950 Nevada gubernatorial election =

- November 7, 1950
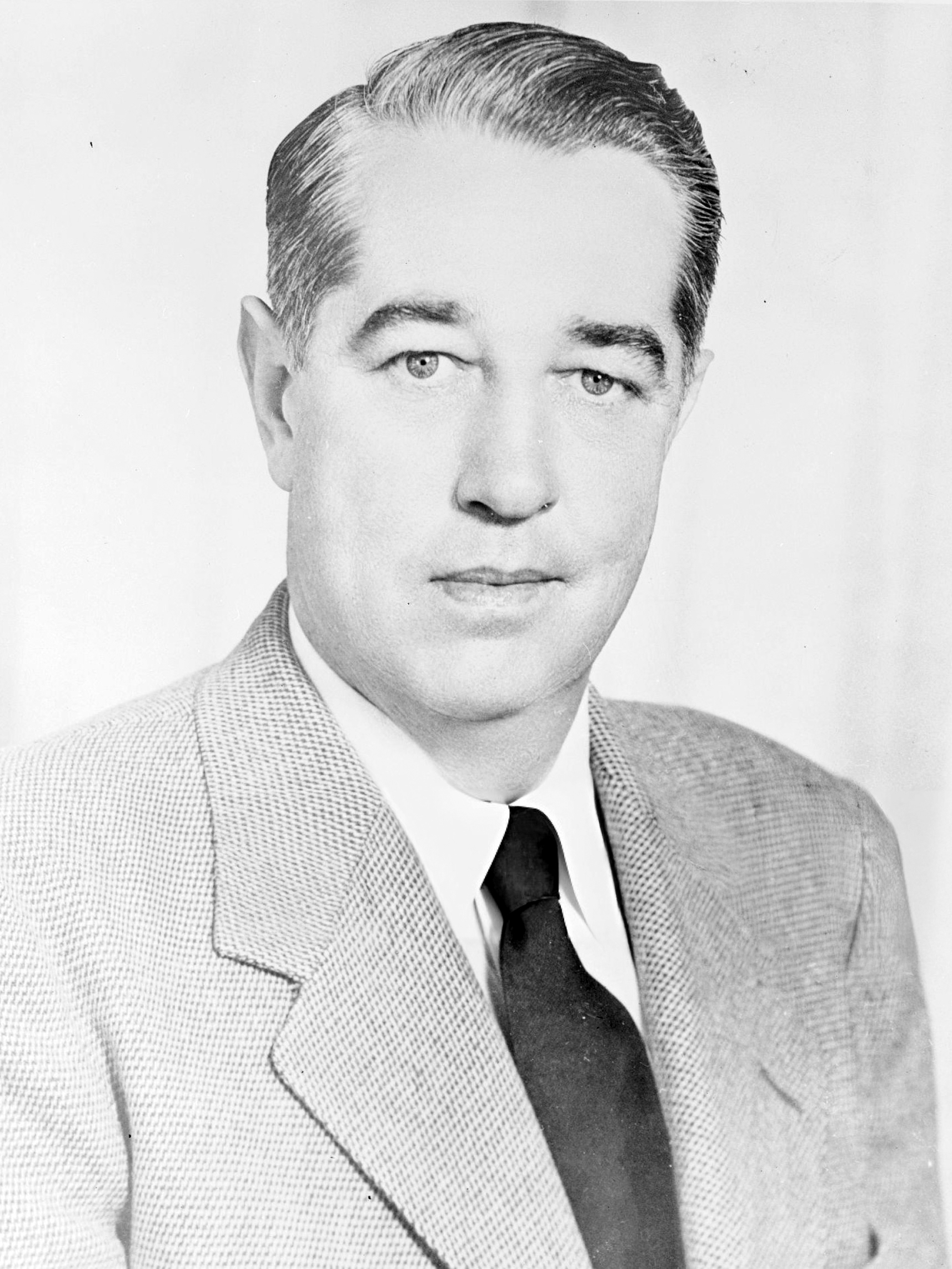

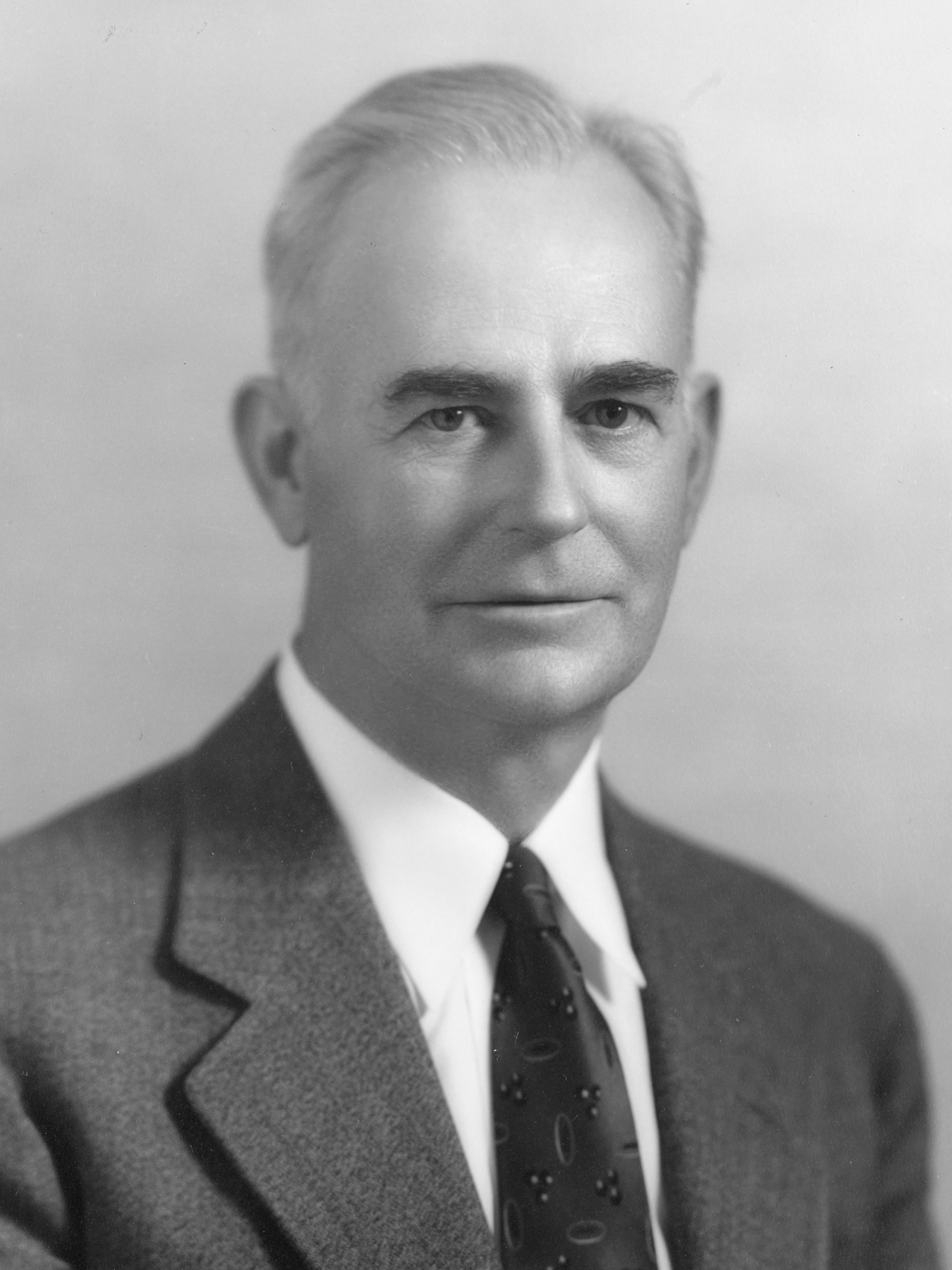
Nominee	Charles H. Russell	Vail Pittman
Party	Republican	Democratic
Popular vote	35,609	26,164
Percentage	57.65%	42.36%
- County results Russell: 50–60% 60–70% 70–80% Pittman: 50–60%
Governor before election
Vail Pittman
Democratic
Elected Governor
Charles H. Russell
Republican

The 1950 Nevada gubernatorial election was held on November 7, 1950. Incumbent Democrat Vail Pittman ran unsuccessfully for re-election to a second term as Governor of Nevada. He was defeated by Republican nominee Charles H. Russell with 57.65% of the vote.

== Primary elections ==
Primary elections were held on September 5, 1950.

=== Democratic primary ===
==== Candidates ====
- Vail Pittman, incumbent Governor
- Roland H. Wiley
- Clem Malone
- Simon W. Conwell
- Charles Wilton Pipkin

==== Results ====
Democratic primary results
Party	Candidate	Votes	%
Democratic	Vail M. Pittman (inc.)	17,963	57.47
Democratic	Roland H. Wiley	8,605	27.53
Democratic	Clem Malone	3,340	10.69
Democratic	Simon W. Conwell	954	3.05
Democratic	Charles Wilton Pipkin	397	1.27
Total votes		31,259	100.00

=== Republican primary ===
==== Candidates ====
- Charles H. Russell, former U.S. Representative
- Fred C. Horlacher
- Ed Bender
- Walter J. Richards
- Ralph Morgali

==== Results ====
Republican primary results
Party	Candidate	Votes	%
Republican	Charles H. Russell	8,453	54.26
Republican	Fred C. Horlacher	3,485	22.37
Republican	Ed Bender	2,234	14.34
Republican	Walter J. Richards	1,061	6.81
Republican	Ralph Morgali	346	2.22
Total votes		15,579	100.00

== General election ==
=== Candidates ===
- Charles H. Russell, Republican
- Vail M. Pittman, Democratic

=== Results ===
1950 Nevada gubernatorial election
Party	Candidate	Votes	%	±%
Republican	Charles H. Russell	35,609	57.65%	+15.07%
Democratic	Vail M. Pittman (inc.)	26,164	42.36%	−15.07%
Majority		9,445	15.29%	
Total votes		61,773	100.00%	
Republican gain from Democratic		Swing	30.13%	

=== Results by county ===
County	Charles H. Russell Republican		Vail M. Pittman Democratic		Margin		Total votes cast
County	#	%	#	%	#	%	Total votes cast
Churchill	1,858	71.49%	741	28.51%	1,117	42.98%	2,599
Clark	8,129	49.52%	8,287	50.48%	-158	-0.96%	16,416
Douglas	761	72.55%	288	27.45%	473	45.09%	1,049
Elko	2,241	56.98%	1,692	43.02%	549	13.96%	3,933
Esmeralda	174	46.28%	202	53.72%	-28	-7.45%	376
Eureka	355	65.99%	183	34.01%	172	31.97%	538
Humboldt	1,139	60.49%	744	39.51%	395	20.98%	1,883
Lander	422	69.52%	185	30.48%	237	39.04%	607
Lincoln	1,025	58.54%	726	41.46%	299	17.08%	1,751
Lyon	1,085	63.01%	637	36.99%	448	26.02%	1,722
Mineral	1,066	57.01%	804	42.99%	262	14.01%	1,870
Nye	910	61.69%	565	38.31%	345	23.39%	1,475
Ormsby	1,198	61.63%	746	38.37%	452	23.25%	1,944
Pershing	937	69.00%	421	31.00%	516	38.00%	1,358
Storey	241	59.51%	164	40.49%	77	19.01%	405
Washoe	12,525	62.06%	7,656	37.94%	4,869	24.13%	20,181
White Pine	1,543	42.09%	2,123	57.91%	-580	-15.82%	3,666
Totals	35,609	57.64%	26,164	42.36%	9,445	15.29%	61,773

==== Counties that flipped from Democratic to Republican ====
- Churchill
- Elko
- Eureka
- Humboldt
- Lander
- Lincoln
- Mineral
- Nye
- Ormsby
- Storey
