= 1990 Nevada gubernatorial election =

- November 6, 1990
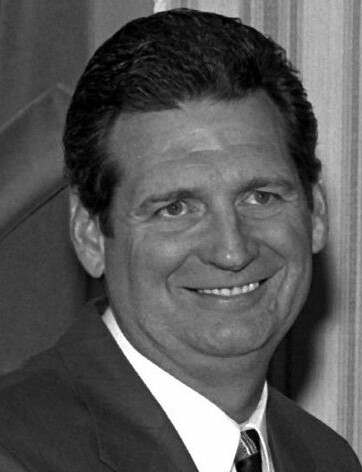

Nominee	Bob Miller	Jim Gallaway
Party	Democratic	Republican
Popular vote	207,878	95,789
Percentage	64.81%	29.86%
- County results Miller: 40–50% 50–60% 60–70%
Governor before election
Bob Miller
Democratic
Elected Governor
Bob Miller
Democratic

The 1990 Nevada gubernatorial election was held on November 6, 1990, to elect the next governor of Nevada, alongside an election to the United States House of Representatives and other state and local elections. Incumbent two-term Democratic Governor Richard Bryan resigned in 1989 after being elected to the United States Senate and under the Nevada succession law, Democrat Lieutenant Governor Bob Miller became the next governor. Miller won in a landslide victory to a full term, defeating Republican nominee Jim Gallaway.

== Democratic primary ==
=== Candidates ===
- Bob Miller, incumbent Governor of Nevada
- Rhinestone Cowboy
- Knight Allen
- William Harrison Morrison
- Robert J. Edwards Sr.
- Federick George Wilson

=== Results ===
Democratic primary results
Party	Candidate	Votes	%
Democratic	Bob Miller (incumbent)	71,537	81.02%
	None of These Candidates	7,394	8.37%
Democratic	Rhinestone Cowboy	2,451	2.78%
Democratic	Knight Allen	2,201	2.49%
Democratic	William Harrison Morrison	2,002	2.27%
Democratic	Robert J. Edwards Sr.	1,707	1.93%
Democratic	Federick George Wilson	1,005	1.14%
Total votes		88,297	100.00%

== Republican primary ==
=== Candidates ===
- Jim Gallaway, businessman
- John Glab
- Charlie Brown
- Vince Lee Thompson
- M.L. "Smokey" Stover
- Loyd Ellis

=== Results ===
Republican Primary results
Party	Candidate	Votes	%
Republican	Jim Gallaway	37,467	48.93%
Republican	Charlie Brown	16,607	21.69%
	None of These Candidates	16,565	21.63%
Republican	John Glab	1,490	1.95%
Republican	M.L. "Smokey" Stover	1,095	1.42%
Republican	Vince Lee Thompson	1,054	1.38%
Republican	Loyd Ellis	914	1.19%
Total votes		75,192	100.00%

== General election ==
=== Candidates ===
- Bob Miller, Democratic
- Jim Gallaway, Republican
- James Frye, Libertarian

=== Results ===
Nevada gubernatorial election, 1990
Party	Candidate	Votes	%	±%
Democratic	Bob Miller (incumbent)	207,878	64.81%	−7.11%
Republican	Jim Gallaway	95,789	29.86%	+4.87%
	None of These Candidates	9,017	2.81%	+0.71%
Libertarian	James Frye	8,059	2.51%	+1.53%
Majority		112,089	34.95%	
Total votes		320,743	100.00%	
Democratic hold		Swing	-11.98%	

=== County results ===
County	Bob Miller Democratic		Jim Gallaway Republican		None of These Candidates		James Frye Libertarian		Margin		Total votes cast
County	#	%	#	%	#	%	#	%	#	%	Total votes cast
Carson City	9,517	63.59%	4,675	31.24%	432	2.89%	342	2.29%	4,842	32.35%	14,966
Churchill	3,315	56.91%	2,173	37.30%	201	3.45%	136	2.33%	1,142	19.61%	5,825
Clark	114,687	66.14%	49,938	28.80%	4,835	2.79%	3,943	2.27%	64,749	37.34%	173,403
Douglas	6,611	61.91%	3,500	32.78%	275	2.58%	292	2.73%	3,111	29.13%	10,678
Elko	3,908	46.73%	3,832	45.82%	335	4.01%	288	3.44%	76	0.91%	8,363
Esmeralda	256	48.95%	221	42.26%	16	3.06%	30	5.74%	35	6.69%	523
Eureka	347	50.95%	279	40.97%	30	4.41%	25	3.67%	68	9.99%	681
Humboldt	2,071	55.91%	1,406	37.96%	122	3.29%	105	2.83%	665	17.95%	3,704
Lander	792	47.88%	765	46.25%	50	3.02%	47	2.84%	27	1.63%	1,654
Lincoln	1,052	69.35%	378	24.92%	54	3.56%	33	2.18%	674	44.43%	1,517
Lyon	4,815	67.36%	2,004	28.04%	142	1.99%	187	2.62%	2,811	39.33%	7,148
Mineral	1,719	67.60%	691	27.17%	66	2.60%	67	2.63%	1,028	40.42%	2,543
Nye	3,172	54.63%	2,120	36.51%	229	3.94%	285	4.91%	1,052	18.12%	5,806
Pershing	814	60.66%	426	31.74%	49	3.65%	53	3.95%	388	28.91%	1,342
Storey	874	68.12%	327	25.49%	47	3.66%	35	2.73%	547	42.63%	1,283
Washoe	51,746	66.32%	22,235	28.50%	1,940	2.49%	2,102	2.69%	29,511	37.82%	78,023
White Pine	2,182	66.44%	819	24.94%	194	5.91%	89	2.71%	1,363	41.50%	3,284
Totals	207,878	64.81%	95,789	29.86%	9,017	2.81%	8,059	2.51%	112,089	34.95%	320,743
