= 1966 Nevada gubernatorial election =

- November 8, 1966
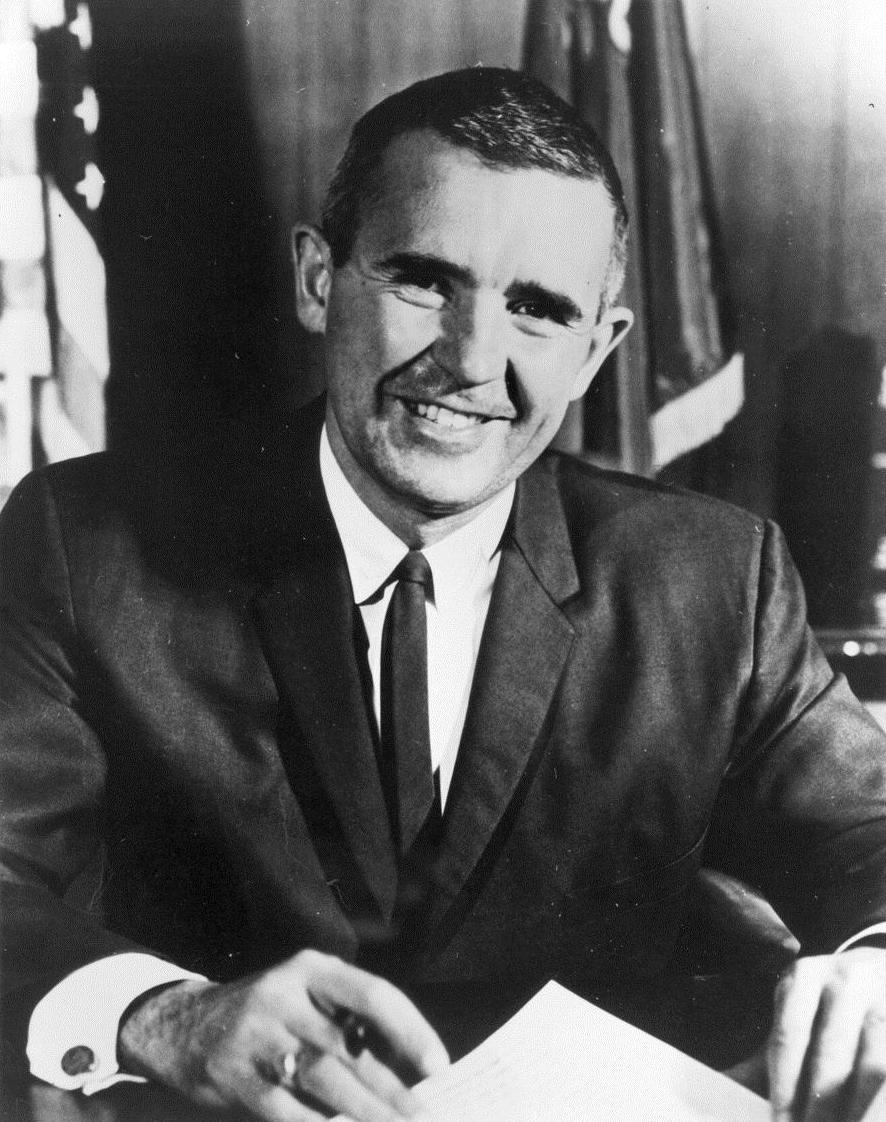

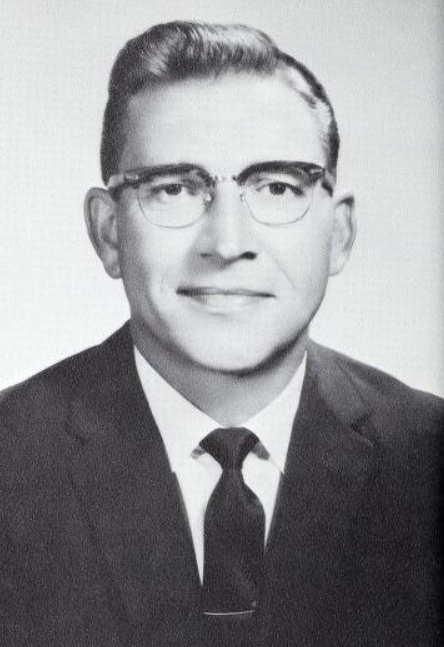
Nominee	Paul Laxalt	Grant Sawyer
Party	Republican	Democratic
Popular vote	71,807	65,870
Percentage	52.16%	47.84%
- County results Laxalt: 50–60% 60–70% Sawyer: 50–60%
Governor before election
Grant Sawyer
Democratic
Elected Governor
Paul Laxalt
Republican

The 1966 Nevada gubernatorial election occurred on November 8, 1966. Incumbent Democrat Grant Sawyer, who was challenged in the Democratic primary by Charles E. Springer, ran unsuccessfully for re-election to a third term as Governor of Nevada. He was defeated by Republican nominee Paul Laxalt.

== Primary elections ==
Primary elections were held on September 6, 1966.

=== Democratic primary ===
==== Candidates ====
- Joseph Michael Kadans
- Edward G. Marshall
- George C. Moore
- Dr. Robert (Bob) Mortensen
- Grant Sawyer
- Charles E. Springer

==== Results ====
Democratic primary results
Party	Candidate	Votes	%
Democratic	Grant Sawyer	40,982	58.62%
Democratic	Edward G. Marshall	13,858	19.82%
Democratic	Charles E. Springer	13,270	18.98%
Democratic	Dr. Robert (Bob) Mortensen	699	1.00%
Democratic	George C. Moore	593	0.85%
Democratic	Joseph Michael Kadans	514	0.74%
Total votes		69,916	100.00%

=== Republican primary ===
==== Candidates ====
- Paul Laxalt
- John P. Screen

==== Results ====
Republican primary results
Party	Candidate	Votes	%
Republican	Paul Laxalt	32,768	94.70%
Republican	John P. Screen	1,834	5.30%
Total votes		34,602	100.00%

== General election ==
=== Results ===
Nevada gubernatorial election, 1966
Party	Candidate	Votes	%	±%
Republican	Paul Laxalt	71,807	52.16%	+18.99%
Democratic	Grant Sawyer (inc.)	65,870	47.84%	−18.99%
Majority		5,937	4.31%	
Total votes		137,677	100.00%	
Republican gain from Democratic		Swing	+37.99%	

==== By county ====
County	Paul Laxalt Republican		Grant Sawyer Democratic		Margin		Total
County	#	%	#	%	#	%	Total
Churchill	1,919	55.35%	1,548	44.65%	371	10.70%	3,467
Clark	32,116	49.62%	32,603	50.38%	-487	-0.75%	64,719
Douglas	1,521	60.33%	1,000	39.67%	521	20.67%	2,521
Elko	2,199	46.19%	2,562	53.81%	-363	-7.62%	4,761
Esmeralda	138	41.95%	191	58.05%	-53	-16.11%	329
Eureka	293	56.89%	222	43.11%	71	13.79%	515
Humboldt	1,308	52.93%	1,163	47.07%	145	5.87%	2,471
Lander	410	42.09%	564	57.91%	-154	-15.81%	974
Lincoln	687	52.40%	624	47.60%	63	4.81%	1,311
Lyon	1,719	58.87%	1,201	41.13%	518	17.74%	2,920
Mineral	1,266	46.75%	1,442	53.25%	-176	-6.50%	2,708
Nye	919	48.57%	973	51.43%	-54	-2.85%	1,892
Ormsby	3,198	58.52%	2,267	41.48%	931	17.04%	5,465
Pershing	618	50.70%	601	49.30%	17	1.39%	1,219
Storey	235	48.35%	251	51.65%	-16	-3.29%	486
Washoe	21,323	56.34%	16,526	43.66%	4,797	12.67%	37,849
White Pine	1,938	47.62%	2,132	52.38%	-194	-4.77%	4,070

==== Counties that flipped from Democratic to Republican ====
- Churchill
- Douglas
- Eureka
- Humboldt
- Lincoln
- Lyon
- Ormsby
- Pershing
- Washoe
