= 1946 Nevada gubernatorial election =

- November 5, 1946
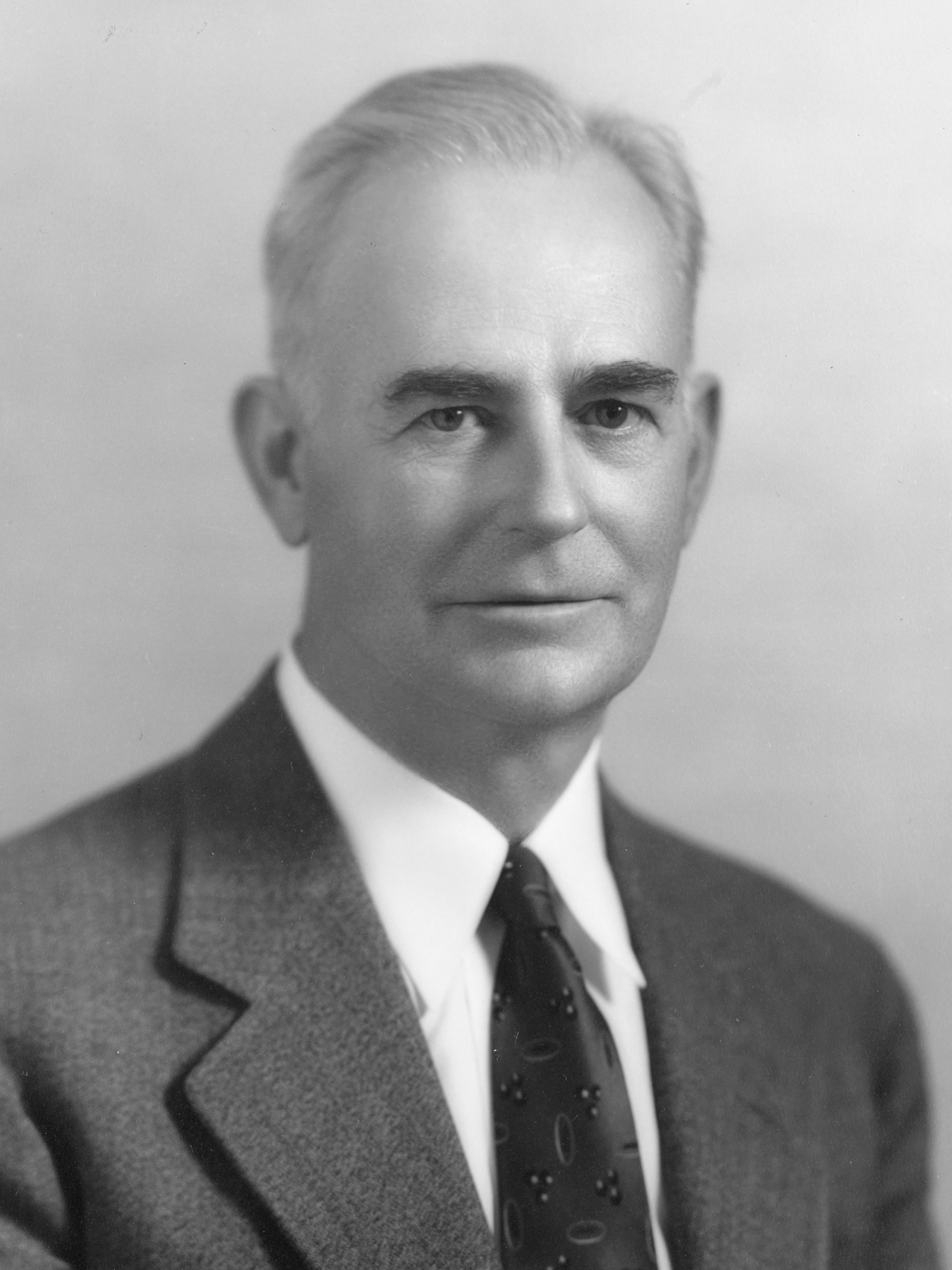

Nominee	Vail Pittman	Melvin E. Jepson
Party	Democratic	Republican
Popular vote	28,655	21,247
Percentage	57.42%	42.58%
- County results Pittman: 50–60% 60–70% 70–80% Jepson: 50–60%
Governor before election
Vail Pittman
Democratic
Elected Governor
Vail Pittman
Democratic

The 1946 Nevada gubernatorial election was held on November 5, 1946. Incumbent Democrat Vail Pittman defeated Republican nominee Melvin E. Jepson with 57.42% of the vote.

== Primary elections ==
Primary elections were held on September 3, 1946.

=== Democratic primary ===
==== Candidates ====
- Vail Pittman, incumbent Governor
- Simon W. Conwell

==== Results ====
Democratic primary results
Party	Candidate	Votes	%
Democratic	Vail M. Pittman (inc.)	19,495	83.01
Democratic	Simon W. Conwell	3,989	16.99
Total votes		23,484	100.00

=== Republican primary ===
==== Candidates ====
- Melvin E. Jepson, Washoe County District Attorney
- Aaron V. Tallman, State Senator

==== Results ====
Republican primary results
Party	Candidate	Votes	%
Republican	Melvin E. Jepson	5,347	50.88
Republican	Aaron V. Tallman	5,162	49.12
Total votes		10,509	100.00

== General election ==
=== Candidates ===
- Vail M. Pittman, Democratic
- Melvin E. Jepson, Republican

=== Results ===
1946 Nevada gubernatorial election
Party	Candidate	Votes	%	±%
Democratic	Vail M. Pittman (inc.)	28,655	57.42%	−2.83%
Republican	Melvin E. Jepson	21,247	42.58%	+2.83%
Majority		7,408	14.85%	
Total votes		49,902	100.00%	
Democratic hold		Swing	-5.66%	

=== Results by county ===
County	Vail M. Pittman Democratic		Melvin E. Jepson Republican		Margin		Total votes cast
County	#	%	#	%	#	%	Total votes cast
Churchill	1,259	55.44%	1,012	44.56%	247	10.88%	2,271
Clark	6,970	62.94%	4,104	37.06%	2,866	25.88%	11,074
Douglas	312	40.78%	453	59.22%	-141	-18.43%	765
Elko	2,279	67.59%	1,093	32.41%	1,186	35.17%	3,372
Esmeralda	247	66.22%	126	33.78%	121	32.44%	373
Eureka	289	51.15%	276	48.85%	13	2.30%	565
Humboldt	972	57.08%	731	42.92%	241	14.15%	1,703
Lander	419	53.44%	365	46.56%	54	6.89%	784
Lincoln	1,255	73.35%	456	26.65%	799	46.70%	1,711
Lyon	673	47.49%	744	52.51%	-71	-5.01%	1,417
Mineral	1,219	62.35%	736	37.65%	483	24.71%	1,955
Nye	772	53.57%	669	46.43%	103	7.15%	1,441
Ormsby	918	55.17%	746	44.83%	172	10.34%	1,664
Pershing	512	47.28%	571	52.72%	-59	-5.45%	1,083
Storey	183	54.30%	154	45.70%	29	8.61%	337
Washoe	7,812	49.47%	7,978	50.53%	-166	-1.05%	15,790
White Pine	2,564	71.28%	1,033	28.72%	1,531	42.56%	3,597
Totals	28,655	57.42%	21,247	42.58%	7,408	14.85%	49,902

==== Counties that flipped from Republican to Democratic ====
- Humboldt

==== Counties that flipped from Democratic to Republican ====
- Douglas
- Lyon
- Pershing
- Washoe
