= 1954 Nevada gubernatorial election =

- November 2, 1954
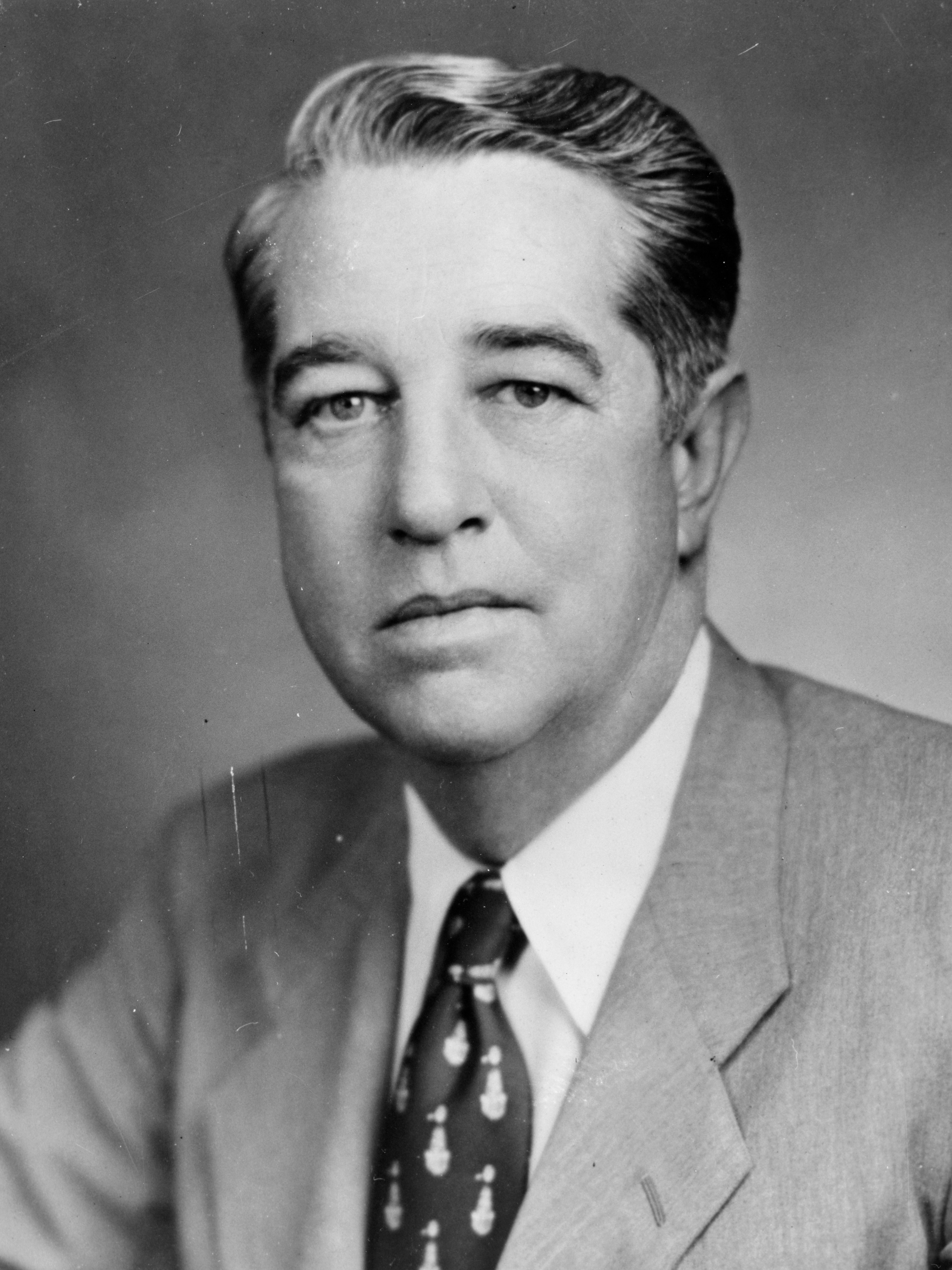

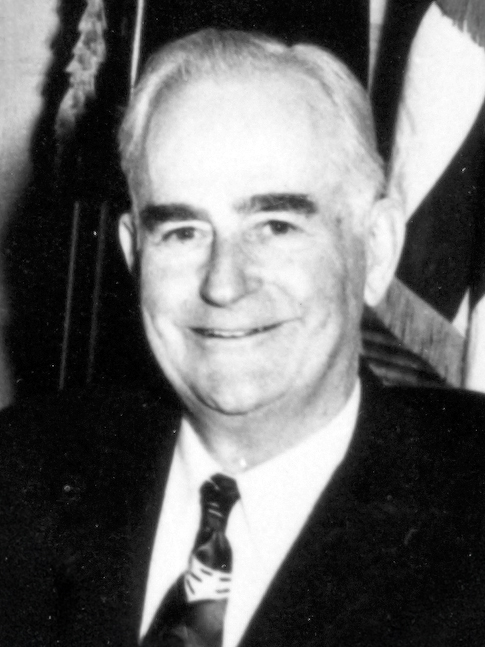
Nominee	Charles H. Russell	Vail Pittman
Party	Republican	Democratic
Popular vote	41,665	36,797
Percentage	53.10%	46.90%
- County results Russell: 50–60% 60–70% 70–80% Pittman: 50–60% 60–70%
Governor before election
Charles H. Russell
Republican
Elected Governor
Charles H. Russell
Republican

The 1954 Nevada gubernatorial election was held on November 2, 1954. Incumbent Republican Charles H. Russell defeated Democratic nominee and former Governor Vail M. Pittman on a re-match with 53.10% of the vote.

== Primary elections ==
Primary elections were held on June 1, 1954.

=== Democratic primary ===
==== Candidates ====
- Vail M. Pittman, former Governor
- Archie C. Grant
- Thomas B. Mechling
- Merrill Inch
- Simon W. Conwell

==== Results ====
Democratic primary results
Party	Candidate	Votes	%
Democratic	Vail M. Pittman	14,427	39.31
Democratic	Archie C. Grant	9,660	26.32
Democratic	Thomas B. Mechling	9,270	25.26
Democratic	Merrill Inch	2,717	7.40
Democratic	Simon W. Conwell	631	1.72
Total votes		36,705	100.00

== General election ==
=== Candidates ===
- Charles H. Russell, Republican
- Vail M. Pittman, Democratic

=== Results ===
1954 Nevada gubernatorial election
Party	Candidate	Votes	%	±%
Republican	Charles H. Russell (inc.)	41,665	53.10%	−4.54%
Democratic	Vail M. Pittman	36,797	46.90%	+4.54%
Majority		4,868	6.20%	
Total votes		78,462	100.00%	
Republican hold		Swing	-9.09%	

=== Results by county ===
County	Charles H. Russell Republican		Vail M. Pittman Democratic		Margin		Total votes cast
County	#	%	#	%	#	%	Total votes cast
Churchill	1,711	65.38%	906	34.62%	805	30.76%	2,617
Clark	11,651	48.31%	12,466	51.69%	-815	-3.38%	24,117
Douglas	911	71.79%	358	28.21%	553	43.58%	1,269
Elko	2,430	56.68%	1,857	43.32%	573	13.37%	4,287
Esmeralda	167	53.35%	146	46.65%	21	6.71%	313
Eureka	348	63.62%	199	36.38%	149	27.24%	547
Humboldt	1,073	58.41%	764	41.59%	309	16.82%	1,837
Lander	545	54.45%	456	45.55%	89	8.89%	1,001
Lincoln	650	38.55%	1,036	61.45%	-386	-22.89%	1,686
Lyon	1,193	53.81%	1,024	46.19%	169	7.62%	2,217
Mineral	1,301	49.77%	1,313	50.23%	-12	-0.46%	2,614
Nye	816	57.42%	605	42.58%	211	14.85%	1,421
Ormsby	1,351	59.81%	908	40.19%	443	19.61%	2,259
Pershing	816	58.08%	589	41.92%	227	16.16%	1,405
Storey	206	52.15%	189	47.85%	17	4.30%	395
Washoe	14,753	56.45%	11,380	43.55%	3,373	12.91%	26,133
White Pine	1,743	40.12%	2,601	59.88%	-858	-19.75%	4,344
Totals	41,665	53.10%	36,797	46.90%	4,868	6.20%	78,462

==== Counties that flipped from Democratic to Republican ====
- Esmeralda

==== Counties that flipped from Republican to Democratic ====
- Lincoln
- Mineral
