= 2006 Nevada gubernatorial election =

- November 7, 2006
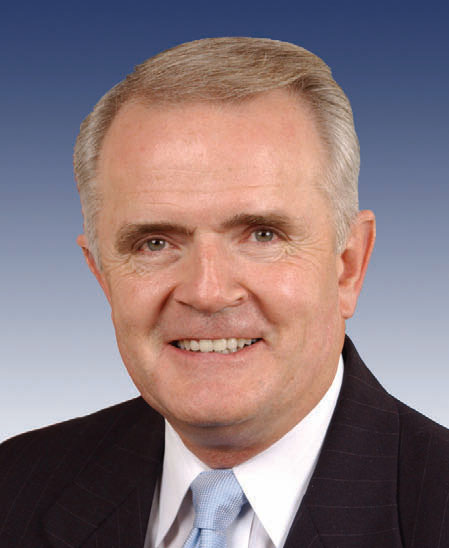

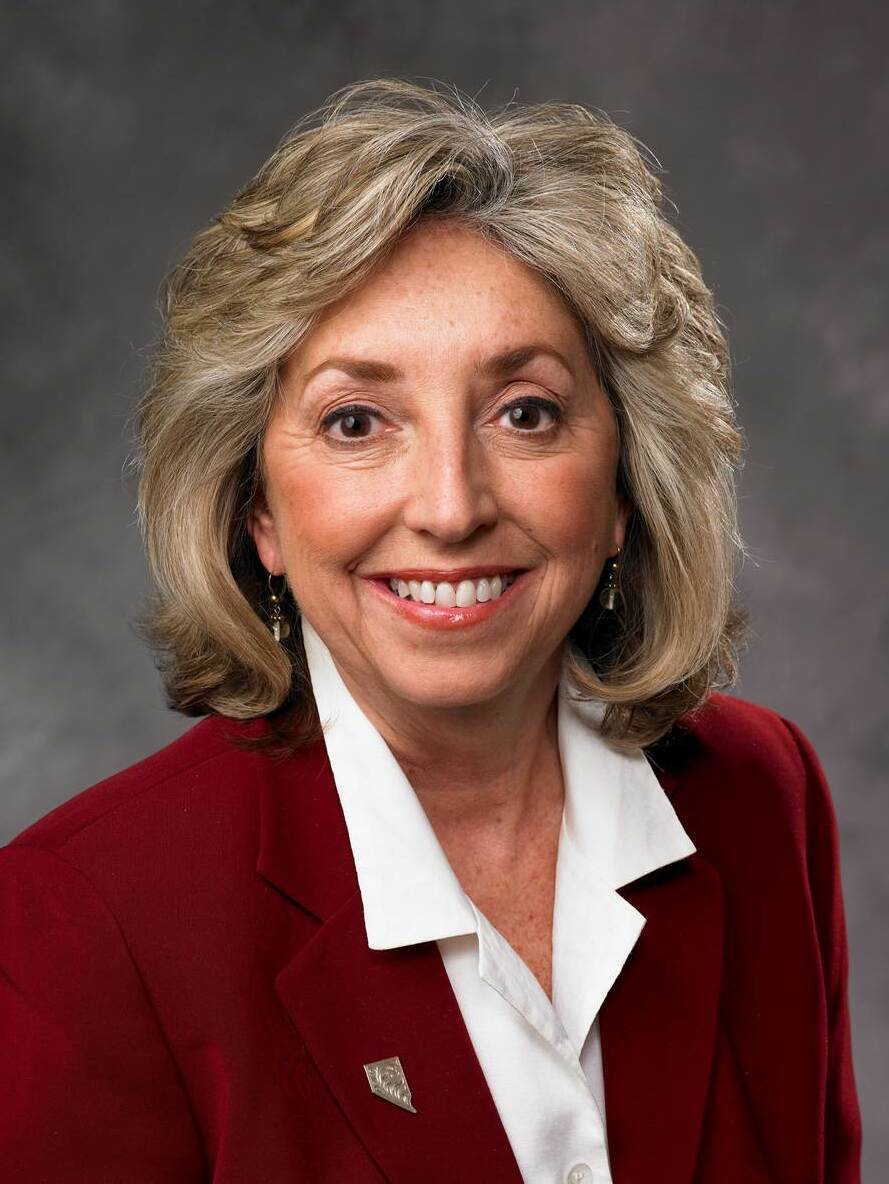
Nominee	Jim Gibbons	Dina Titus
Party	Republican	Democratic
Popular vote	279,003	255,684
Percentage	47.93%	43.92%
- County results Gibbons: 50–60% 60–70% 70–80% Titus: 40–50%
Governor before election
Kenny Guinn
Republican
Elected Governor
Jim Gibbons
Republican

The 2006 Nevada gubernatorial election was held on November 7, 2006. Incumbent Governor Kenny Guinn could not run due to term limits. Republican Congressman Jim Gibbons defeated Democratic State Senator Dina Titus. As of 2026, this is the most recent election in which Nevada voted for a gubernatorial candidate of the same party as the incumbent president.

== Republican Party ==
=== Candidates ===
- Bob Beers, Nevada State Senator
- Jim Gibbons, U.S. Representative from Nevada's 2nd congressional district and nominee in 1994
- Lorraine Hunt, Lieutenant Governor of Nevada
- Stan Lusak, perennial candidate
- Melody "Mimi Miyagi" Damayo, former adult film actress

=== Results ===
Republican Primary results
Party	Candidate	Votes	%
Republican	Jim Gibbons	67,717	48.19%
Republican	Bob Beers	40,876	29.09%
Republican	Lorraine Hunt	25,161	17.91%
	None of These Candidates	4,316	3.07%
Republican	Mimi Miyagi Damayo	1,651	1.17%
Republican	Stan Lusak	794	0.57%
Total votes		140,515	100.00%

== Democratic primary ==
=== Candidates ===
- Dina Titus, Minority Leader of the Nevada Senate
- James B. Gibson, Mayor of Henderson
- Leola McConnell, liberal activist

=== Results ===
Democratic primary results
Party	Candidate	Votes	%
Democratic	Dina Titus	63,999	53.76%
Democratic	James B. Gibson	42,966	36.09%
	None of These Candidates	7,062	5.93%
Democratic	Leola McConnell	5,019	4.22%
Total votes		119,046	100.00%

== Other parties ==
=== Green Party ===
- Craig Bergland, activist

=== Independent American Party ===
- Christopher Hansen

== General election ==
=== Predictions ===
Source	Ranking	As of
The Cook Political Report	Tossup	November 6, 2006
Sabato's Crystal Ball	Lean R	November 6, 2006
Rothenberg Political Report	Tossup	November 2, 2006
Real Clear Politics	Lean R	November 6, 2006

=== Endorsements ===
Dina Titus (D)

Individuals

- Wesley Clark, General, 2004 democratic presidential candidate

=== Polling ===
Source	Date	Dina Titus (D)	Jim Gibbons (R)
Zogby/WSJ	October 31, 2006	48%	47%
Research 2000	October 23, 2006	41%	47%
Rasmussen	October 17, 2006	43%	51%
Zogby/WSJ	October 10, 2006	43%	48%
Rasmussen	September 22, 2006	35%	49%
Research 2000	September 22, 2006	38%	45%
Zogby/WSJ	September 11, 2006	39%	47%
Garin-Hart-Yang Research	September 10, 2006	46%	45%
Zogby/WSJ	August 28, 2006	47%	44%
Mason-Dixon	August 10, 2006	35%	46%
Rasmussen	August 7, 2006	37%	46%
Zogby/WSJ	July 24, 2006	40%	45%
Zogby/WSJ	June 21, 2006	37%	45%
Reno Gazette-Journal/News 4 Poll	May 19, 2006	36%	46%
Las Vegas Review-Journal/Mason-Dixon Poll	April 3–5, 2006	33%	50%
Rasmussen	February 2, 2006	41%	46%
Rasmussen	December 1, 2005	39%	45%

=== Results ===
Nevada gubernatorial election, 2006
Party	Candidate	Votes	%	±%
Republican	Jim Gibbons	279,003	47.93%	−20.32%
Democratic	Dina Titus	255,684	43.92%	+21.91%
	None of These Candidates	20,699	3.56%	−1.14%
Independent American	Christopher H. Hansen	20,019	3.44%	+2.04%
Green	Craig Bergland	6,753	1.16%	+0.21%
Plurality		23,319	4.01%	
Total votes		582,158	100.00%	
Republican hold		Swing	-42.23%	

==== By county ====
County	Jim Gibbons Republican		Dina Titus Democratic		None of These Candidates		Christopher H. Hansen Independent American		Craig Bergland Green		Margin		Total votes cast
County	#	%	#	%	#	%	#	%	#	%	#	%	Total votes cast
Carson City	9,716	53.46%	6,989	38.46%	717	3.95%	565	3.11%	186	1.02%	2,727	15.01%	18,173
Churchill	5,627	69.37%	1,806	22.26%	262	3.23%	349	4.30%	68	0.84%	3,821	47.10%	8,112
Clark	153,876	42.78%	177,300	49.29%	12,862	3.58%	11,810	3.28%	3,854	1.07%	-23,424	-6.51%	359,702
Douglas	11,918	61.65%	5,929	30.67%	630	3.26%	591	3.06%	265	1.37%	5,989	30.98%	19,333
Elko	7,938	67.21%	2,873	24.32%	343	2.90%	564	4.78%	93	0.79%	5,065	42.88%	11,811
Esmeralda	297	68.43%	92	21.20%	18	4.15%	21	4.84%	6	1.38%	205	47.24%	434
Eureka	515	71.43%	121	16.78%	27	3.74%	54	7.49%	4	0.55%	394	54.65%	721
Humboldt	3,119	69.26%	987	21.92%	168	3.73%	184	4.09%	45	1.00%	2,132	47.35%	4,503
Lander	1,291	72.04%	369	20.59%	54	3.01%	73	4.07%	5	0.28%	922	51.45%	1,792
Lincoln	1,165	63.08%	465	25.18%	92	4.98%	107	5.79%	18	0.97%	700	37.90%	1,847
Lyon	9,329	61.88%	4,310	28.59%	507	3.36%	746	4.95%	184	1.22%	5,019	33.29%	15,076
Mineral	1,188	56.46%	676	32.13%	102	4.85%	101	4.80%	37	1.76%	512	24.33%	2,104
Nye	5,950	50.24%	4,446	37.54%	480	4.05%	844	7.13%	122	1.03%	1,504	12.70%	11,842
Pershing	976	63.67%	404	26.35%	67	4.37%	69	4.50%	17	1.11%	572	37.31%	1,533
Storey	1,070	57.10%	626	33.40%	68	3.63%	88	4.70%	22	1.17%	444	23.69%	1,874
Washoe	63,057	52.56%	47,296	39.42%	4,166	3.47%	3,666	3.06%	1,786	1.49%	15,761	13.14%	119,971
White Pine	1,971	59.19%	995	29.88%	136	4.08%	187	5.62%	41	1.23%	976	29.31%	3,330
Totals	279,003	47.93%	255,684	43.92%	20,699	3.56%	20,019	3.44%	6,753	1.16%	23,319	4.01%	582,158

Counties that flipped from Republican to Democratic

- Clark (largest municipality: Las Vegas)
