= 1938 Nevada gubernatorial election =

- November 8, 1938
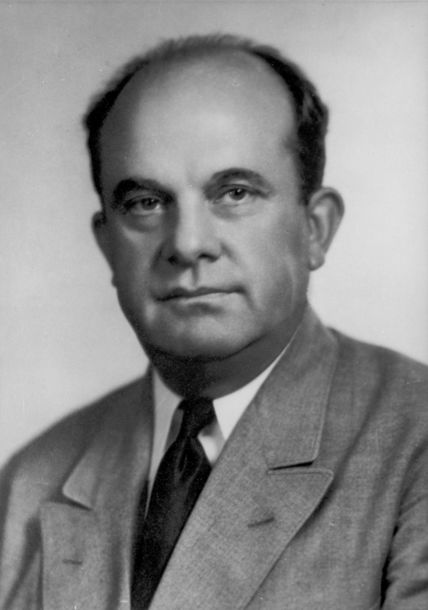

Nominee	Edward P. Carville	John A. Fulton
Party	Democratic	Republican
Popular vote	28,528	17,586
Percentage	61.86%	38.14%
- County results Carville: 50–60% 60–70% 70–80% 80–90% Fulton: 50–60% 60–70%
Governor before election
Richard Kirman Sr.
Democratic
Elected Governor
Edward P. Carville
Democratic

The 1938 Nevada gubernatorial election was held on November 8, 1938. Democratic nominee Edward P. Carville defeated Republican nominee John A. Fulton with 61.86% of the vote.

== Primary elections ==
Primary elections were held on September 6, 1938.

=== Democratic primary ===
==== Candidates ====
- Edward P. Carville, former United States Attorney for the District of Nevada
- Harley A. Harmon, Chairman of the Nevada Public Service Commission
- Charles L. Richards, former U.S. Representative

==== Results ====
Democratic primary results
Party	Candidate	Votes	%
Democratic	Edward P. Carville	12,279	50.60
Democratic	Harley A. Harmon	9,558	39.39
Democratic	Charles L. Richards	2,428	10.01
Total votes		24,265	100.00

=== Republican primary ===
==== Candidates ====
- John A. Fulton
- John A. Durkee

==== Results ====
Republican primary results
Party	Candidate	Votes	%
Republican	John A. Fulton	4,854	55.83
Republican	John A. Durkee	3,841	44.18
Total votes		8,695	100.00

== General election ==
=== Candidates ===
- Edward P. Carville, Democratic
- John A. Fulton, Republican

=== Results ===
1938 Nevada gubernatorial election
Party	Candidate	Votes	%	±%
Democratic	Edward P. Carville	28,528	61.86%	+7.93%
Republican	John A. Fulton	17,586	38.14%	+3.61%
Majority		10,942	23.73%	
Total votes		46,114	100.00%	
Democratic hold		Swing	+4.31%	

=== Results by county ===
County	Edward P. Carville Democratic		John A. Fulton Republican		Margin		Total votes cast
County	#	%	#	%	#	%	Total votes cast
Churchill	1,032	43.90%	1,319	56.10%	-287	-12.21%	2,351
Clark	4,721	79.64%	1,207	20.36%	3,514	59.28%	5,928
Douglas	270	32.85%	552	67.15%	-282	-34.31%	822
Elko	3,044	76.75%	922	23.25%	2,122	53.50%	3,966
Esmeralda	558	61.25%	353	38.75%	205	22.50%	911
Eureka	449	71.96%	175	28.04%	274	43.91%	624
Humboldt	1,250	64.90%	676	35.10%	574	29.80%	1,926
Lander	588	65.92%	304	34.08%	284	31.84%	892
Lincoln	1,615	80.71%	386	19.29%	1,229	61.42%	2,001
Lyon	975	51.86%	905	48.14%	70	3.72%	1,880
Mineral	593	61.84%	366	38.16%	227	23.67%	959
Nye	1,215	64.42%	671	35.58%	544	28.84%	1,886
Ormsby	778	54.33%	654	45.67%	124	8.66%	1,432
Pershing	665	56.93%	503	43.07%	162	13.87%	1,168
Storey	377	63.90%	213	36.10%	164	27.80%	590
Washoe	7,554	51.84%	7,018	48.16%	536	3.68%	14,572
White Pine	2,844	67.62%	1,362	32.38%	1,482	35.24%	4,206
Totals	28,528	61.86%	17,586	38.14%	10,942	23.73%	46,114

==== Counties that flipped from Republican to Democratic ====
- Elko

==== Counties that flipped from Independent to Democratic ====
- Eureka
- White Pine

==== Counties that flipped from Democratic to Republican ====
- Churchill
