= 1922 Nevada gubernatorial election =

- November 7, 1922
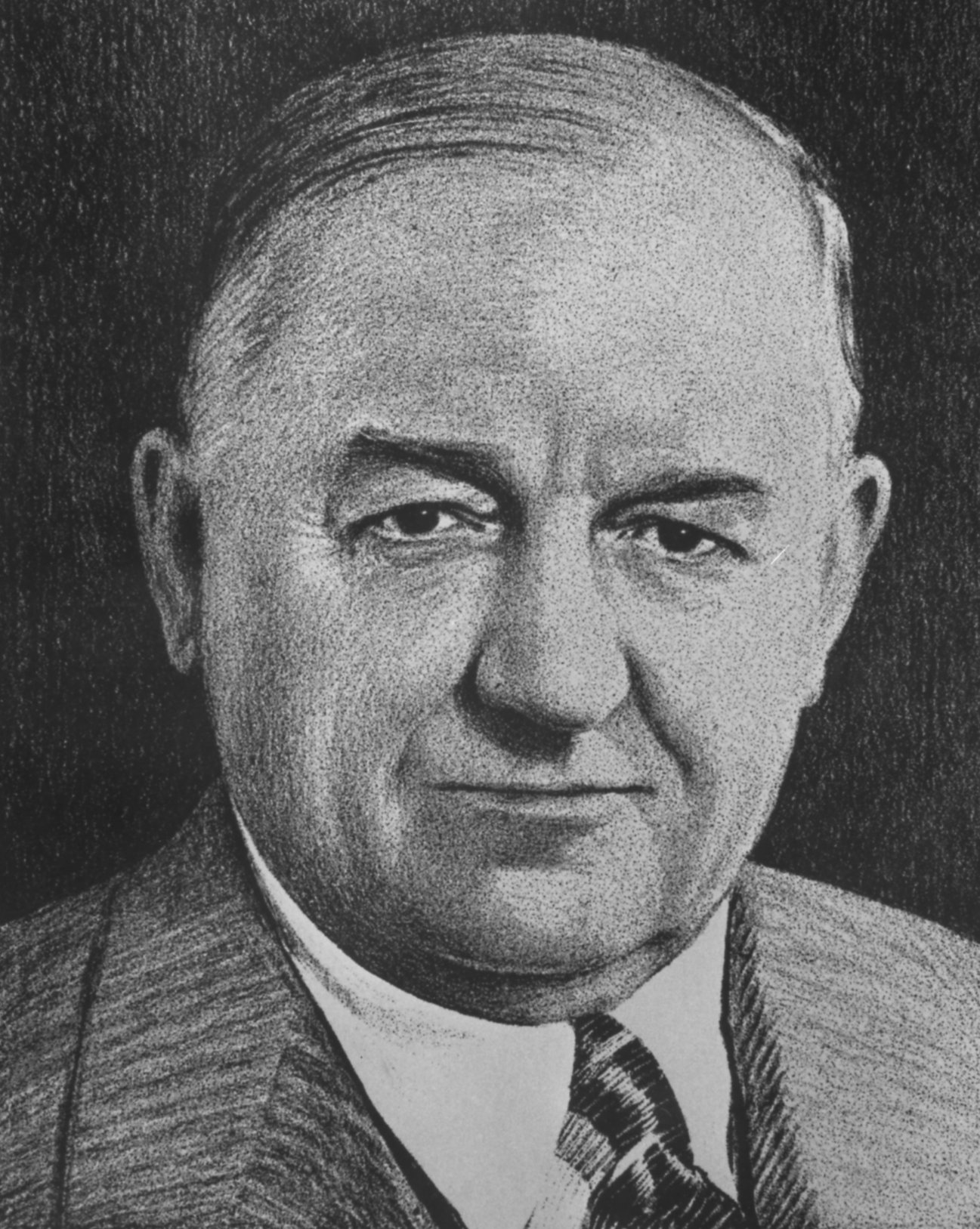

Nominee	James G. Scrugham	John H. Miller
Party	Democratic	Republican
Popular vote	15,437	13,215
Percentage	53.88%	46.12%
- County results Scrugham: 50–60% 60–70% Miller: 50–60% 60–70%
Governor before election
Emmet D. Boyle
Democratic
Elected Governor
James G. Scrugham
Democratic

The 1922 Nevada gubernatorial election was held on November 7, 1922. Democratic nominee James G. Scrugham defeated Republican nominee John H. Miller with 53.88% of the vote.

== Primary elections ==
Primary elections were held on September 5, 1922.

=== Democratic primary ===
==== Candidates ====
- James G. Scrugham, Nevada Public Service Commissioner
- James T. Boyd

==== Results ====
Democratic primary results
Party	Candidate	Votes	%
Democratic	James G. Scrugham	5,361	62.20
Democratic	James T. Boyd	3,258	37.80
Total votes		8,619	100.00

=== Republican primary ===
==== Candidates ====
- John H. Miller
- James Gault

==== Results ====
Republican primary results
Party	Candidate	Votes	%
Republican	John H. Miller	6,078	73.20
Republican	James Gault	2,225	26.80
Total votes		8,303	100.00

== General election ==
=== Candidates ===
- James G. Scrugham, Democratic
- John H. Miller, Republican

=== Results ===
1922 Nevada gubernatorial election
Party	Candidate	Votes	%	±%
Democratic	James G. Scrugham	15,437	53.88%	+1.79%
Republican	John H. Miller	13,215	46.12%	−1.79%
Majority		2,222	7.76%	
Total votes		28,652	100.00%	
Democratic hold		Swing	+3.59%	

=== Results by county ===
County	James G. Scrugham Democratic		John H. Miller Republican		Margin		Total votes cast
County	#	%	#	%	#	%	Total votes cast
Churchill	679	37.81%	1,117	62.19%	-438	-24.39%	1,796
Clark	1,119	67.41%	541	32.59%	578	34.82%	1,660
Douglas	259	35.53%	470	64.47%	-211	-28.94%	729
Elko	1,731	57.34%	1,288	42.66%	443	14.67%	3,019
Esmeralda	553	57.66%	406	42.34%	147	15.33%	959
Eureka	219	43.28%	287	56.72%	-68	-13.44%	506
Humboldt	808	61.96%	496	38.04%	312	23.93%	1,304
Lander	403	52.61%	363	47.39%	40	5.22%	766
Lincoln	544	69.39%	240	30.61%	304	38.78%	784
Lyon	630	43.93%	804	56.07%	-174	-12.13%	1,434
Mineral	315	52.24%	288	47.76%	27	4.48%	603
Nye	1,815	62.69%	1,080	37.31%	735	25.39%	2,895
Ormsby	539	50.14%	536	49.86%	3	0.28%	1,075
Pershing	647	64.12%	362	35.88%	285	28.25%	1,009
Storey	503	48.55%	533	51.45%	-30	-2.90%	1,036
Washoe	3,247	47.04%	3,655	52.96%	-408	-5.91%	6,902
White Pine	1,426	65.56%	749	34.44%	677	31.13%	2,175
Totals	15,437	53.88%	13,215	46.12%	2,222	7.76%	28,652

==== Counties that flipped from Republican to Democratic ====
- Esmeralda

==== Counties that flipped from Democratic to Republican ====
- Storey
