= 1962 Nevada gubernatorial election =

- November 6, 1962
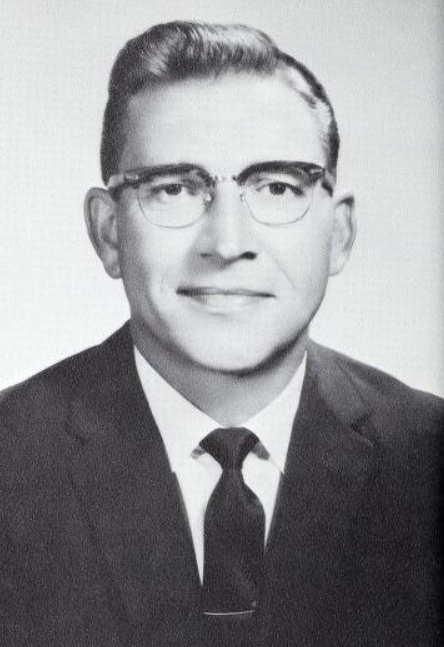

Nominee	Grant Sawyer	Oran K. Gragson
Party	Democratic	Republican
Popular vote	64,784	32,145
Percentage	66.84%	33.16%
- County results Sawyer: 50–60% 60–70% 70–80%
Governor before election
Grant Sawyer
Democratic
Elected Governor
Grant Sawyer
Democratic

The 1962 Nevada gubernatorial election occurred on November 6, 1962. Incumbent Democrat Grant Sawyer ran successfully for re-election to a second term as Governor of Nevada, defeating Republican nominee in Las Vegas mayor Oran K. Gragson.

== Results ==
Nevada gubernatorial election, 1962
Party	Candidate	Votes	%	±%
Democratic	Grant Sawyer (inc.)	64,784	66.84%	+6.92%
Republican	Oran K. Gragson	32,145	33.16%	−6.92%
Majority		32,639	33.67%	
Total votes		96,929	100.00%	
Democratic hold		Swing	+13.84%	

=== Results by county ===
County	Grant Sawyer Democratic		Oran K. Gragson Republican		Margin		Total votes cast
County	#	%	#	%	#	%	Total votes cast
Churchill	1,765	61.80%	1,091	38.20%	674	23.60%	2,856
Clark	27,472	72.22%	10,569	27.78%	16,903	44.43%	38,041
Douglas	932	50.65%	908	49.35%	24	1.30%	1,840
Elko	2,930	71.17%	1,187	28.83%	1,743	42.34%	4,117
Esmeralda	216	64.86%	117	35.14%	99	29.73%	333
Eureka	282	67.30%	137	32.70%	145	34.61%	419
Humboldt	1,258	58.40%	896	41.60%	362	16.81%	2,154
Lander	531	68.34%	246	31.66%	285	36.68%	777
Lincoln	826	73.49%	298	26.51%	528	46.98%	1,124
Lyon	1,480	58.82%	1,036	41.18%	444	17.65%	2,516
Mineral	1,602	68.87%	724	31.13%	878	37.75%	2,326
Nye	1,252	67.57%	601	32.43%	651	35.13%	1,853
Ormsby	2,102	60.72%	1,360	39.28%	742	21.43%	3,462
Pershing	725	61.13%	461	38.87%	264	22.26%	1,186
Storey	267	66.25%	136	33.75%	131	32.51%	403
Washoe	18,692	62.79%	11,075	37.21%	7,617	25.59%	29,767
White Pine	2,452	65.30%	1,303	34.70%	1,149	30.60%	3,755
Totals	64,784	66.84%	32,145	33.16%	32,639	33.67%	96,929

==== Counties that flipped from Republican to Democratic ====
- Douglas
- Ormsby
- Washoe
