= 1889 in the United States =

- Decades: 1860s; 1870s; 1880s; 1890s; 1900s
- See also: History of the United States (1865–1918); Timeline of United States history (1860–1899); List of years in the United States

Events from the year 1889 in the United States. Four states—North Dakota, South Dakota, Montana, and Washington—were created this year, making this the busiest year for state creation since 1788.

== Incumbents ==
=== Federal government ===
- President:

Grover Cleveland (D-New York) (until March 4)
Benjamin Harrison (R-Indiana) (starting March 4)

- Vice President:

vacant (until March 4)
Levi P. Morton (R-New York) (starting March 4)

- Chief Justice: Melville Fuller (Illinois)
- Speaker of the House of Representatives:

John G. Carlisle (D-Kentucky) (until March 4)
Thomas Brackett Reed (R-Maine) (starting December 2)

- Congress: 50th (until March 4), 51st (starting March 4)

==== State governments ====
Governors and lieutenant governors

=== Governors ===
- Governor of Alabama: Thomas Seay (Democratic)
- Governor of Arkansas: Simon Pollard Hughes, Jr. (Democratic) (until January 8), James Philip Eagle (Democratic) (starting January 8)
- Governor of California: Robert Waterman (Republican)
- Governor of Colorado: Alva Adams (Democratic) (until January 8), Job Adams Cooper (Republican) (starting January 8)
- Governor of Connecticut: Phineas C. Lounsbury (Republican) (until January 10), Morgan G. Bulkeley (Republican) (starting January 10)
- Governor of Delaware: Benjamin T. Biggs (Democratic)
- Governor of Florida: Edward A. Perry (Democratic) (until January 8), Francis P. Fleming (Democratic) (starting January 8)
- Governor of Georgia: John B. Gordon (Democratic)
- Governor of Illinois: Richard J. Oglesby (Republican) (until January 14), Joseph W. Fifer (Republican) (starting January 14)
- Governor of Indiana: Isaac P. Gray (Democratic) (until January 14), Alvin P. Hovey (Republican) (starting January 14)
- Governor of Iowa: William Larrabee (Republican)
- Governor of Kansas: John A. Martin (Republican) (until January 14), Lyman U. Humphrey (Republican) (starting January 14)
- Governor of Kentucky: Simon B. Buckner (Democratic)
- Governor of Louisiana: Francis T. Nicholls (Democratic)
- Governor of Maine: Sebastian Streeter Marble (Republican) (until January 2), Edwin C. Burleigh (Republican) (starting January 2)
- Governor of Maryland: Elihu Emory Jackson (Democratic)
- Governor of Massachusetts: Oliver Ames (Republican)
- Governor of Michigan: Cyrus G. Luce (Republican)
- Governor of Minnesota: Andrew R. McGill (Republican) (until January 9), William R. Merriam (Republican) (starting January 9)
- Governor of Mississippi: Robert Lowry (Democratic)
- Governor of Missouri: Albert P. Morehouse (Democratic) (until January 14), David R. Francis (Democratic) (starting January 14)
- Governor of Montana: Benjamin F. White (Republican) (until November 8), Joseph Toole (Democratic) (starting November 8)
- Governor of Nebraska: John Milton Thayer (Republican)
- Governor of Nevada: Charles C. Stevenson (Republican)
- Governor of New Hampshire: Charles H. Sawyer (Republican) (until June 6), David H. Goodell (Republican) (starting June 6)
- Governor of New Jersey: Robert Stockton Green (Democratic)
- Governor of New York: David B. Hill (Democratic)
- Governor of North Carolina: Alfred Moore Scales (Democratic) (until January 17), Daniel Gould Fowle (Democratic) (starting January 17)
- Governor of North Dakota: vacant (until November 20), John Miller (Republican) (starting November 20)
- Governor of Ohio: Joseph B. Foraker (Republican)
- Governor of Oregon: Sylvester Pennoyer (Democratic)
- Governor of Pennsylvania: James A. Beaver (Republican)
- Governor of Rhode Island: Royal C. Taft (Republican) (until May 28), Herbert W. Ladd (Republican) (starting May 28)
- Governor of South Carolina: John Peter Richardson III (Democratic)
- Governor of South Dakota: Arthur C. Mellette (Republican) (starting November 2)
- Governor of Tennessee: Robert Love Taylor (Democratic)
- Governor of Texas: Lawrence Sullivan Ross (Democratic)
- Governor of Vermont: William P. Dillingham (Republican)
- Governor of Virginia: Fitzhugh Lee (Democratic)
- Governor of Washington:
  - until April 9: Eugene Semple (Democratic)
  - April 9-November 11: Miles Conway Moore (Republican)
  - starting November 11: Elisha Peyre Ferry (Republican)
- Governor of West Virginia: Emanuel Willis Wilson (Democratic)
- Governor of Wisconsin: Jeremiah McLain Rusk (Republican) (until January 7), William D. Hoard (Republican) (starting January 7)

=== Lieutenant governors ===
- Lieutenant Governor of California: Stephen M. White (Democratic)
- Lieutenant Governor of Colorado: Norman H. Meldrum (Democratic) (until January 8), William Grover Smith (Republican) (starting January 8)
- Lieutenant Governor of Connecticut: James L. Howard (Republican) (until January 10), Samuel E. Merwin (Republican) (starting January 10)
- Lieutenant Governor of Florida: Milton H. Mabry (Democratic) (until January 8), vacant (starting January 8)
- Lieutenant Governor of Illinois: John Smith (Republican) (until January 14), Lyman Ray (Republican) (starting January 14)
- Lieutenant Governor of Indiana: Robert S. Robertson/Alonzo G. Smith (Republican/Democratic) (until January 14), Ira Joy Chase (Republican) (starting January 14)
- Lieutenant Governor of Iowa: John A. T. Hull (Republican)
- Lieutenant Governor of Kansas: Alexander P. Riddle (Republican) (until January 14), Andrew J. Felt (Republican) (starting January 14)
- Lieutenant Governor of Kentucky: James William Bryan (Democratic)
- Lieutenant Governor of Louisiana: James Jeffries (Democratic)
- Lieutenant Governor of Massachusetts: John Q. A. Brackett (Republican)
- Lieutenant Governor of Michigan: James H. MacDonald (Republican) (until January 19), William Ball (Republican) (starting January 19)
- Lieutenant Governor of Minnesota: Albert E. Rice (Republican)
- Lieutenant Governor of Mississippi: G. D. Shands (Democratic)
- Lieutenant Governor of Missouri: vacant (until January 14), Stephen Hugh Claycomb (Democratic) (starting January 14)
- Lieutenant Governor of Montana: John E. Rickards (Republican)
- Lieutenant Governor of Nebraska: Hibbard H. Shedd (Republican) (until month and day unknown), George D. Meiklejohn (Republican) (starting month and day unknown)
- Lieutenant Governor of Nevada:
  - until month and day unknown: Henry C. Davis (political party unknown)
  - month and day unknown: Samuel W. Chubbuck (political party unknown)
  - Frank Bell (Republican)
- Lieutenant Governor of New York: Edward F. Jones (Democratic)
- Lieutenant Governor of North Carolina: Charles M. Stedman (Democratic) (until January 17), Thomas M. Holt (Democratic) (starting January 17)
- Lieutenant Governor of North Dakota: Alfred Dickey (Republican) (starting November 7)
- Lieutenant Governor of Ohio: William C. Lyon (Republican)
- Lieutenant Governor of Pennsylvania: William T. Davies (Republican)
- Lieutenant Governor of Rhode Island: Enos Lapham (political party unknown) (until May 28), Daniel Littlefield (Republican) (starting May 28)
- Lieutenant Governor of South Carolina: William L. Mauldin (Democratic)
- Lieutenant Governor of South Dakota: James H. Fletcher (Republican) (starting November 2)
- Lieutenant Governor of Tennessee: Z. W. Ewing (Democratic) (until month and day unknown), Benjamin J. Lea (Democratic) (starting month and day unknown)
- Lieutenant Governor of Texas: Thomas B. Wheeler (Democratic)
- Lieutenant Governor of Vermont: Urban A. Woodbury (Republican)
- Lieutenant Governor of Virginia: John Edward "Parson" Massey (Democratic)
- Lieutenant Governor of Washington: Charles E. Laughton (Republican) (starting November 11)
- Lieutenant Governor of Wisconsin: George W. Ryland (Republican)

== Events ==
=== January–March ===
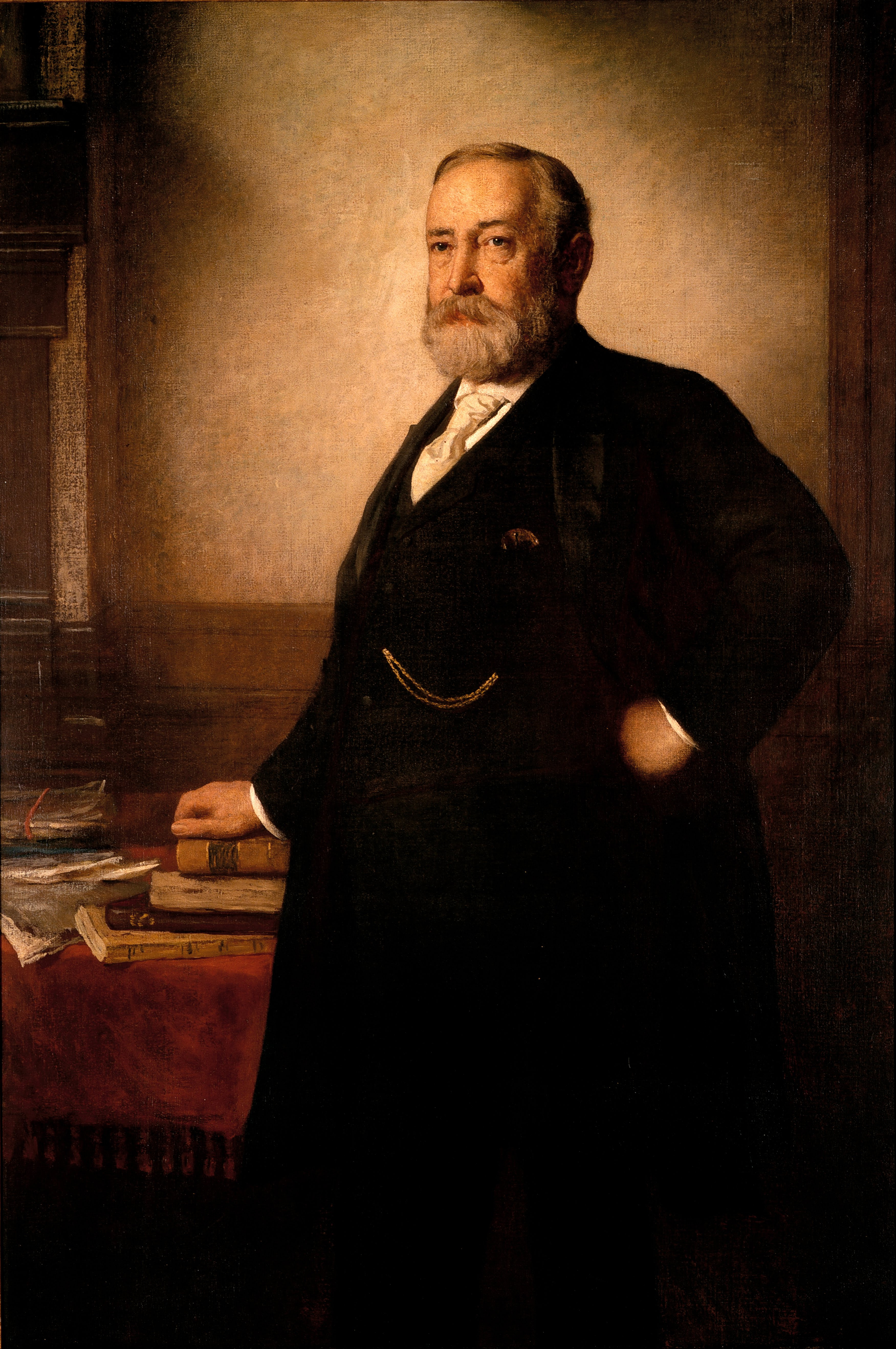
March 4: Benjamin Harrison becomes the 23rd U.S. president

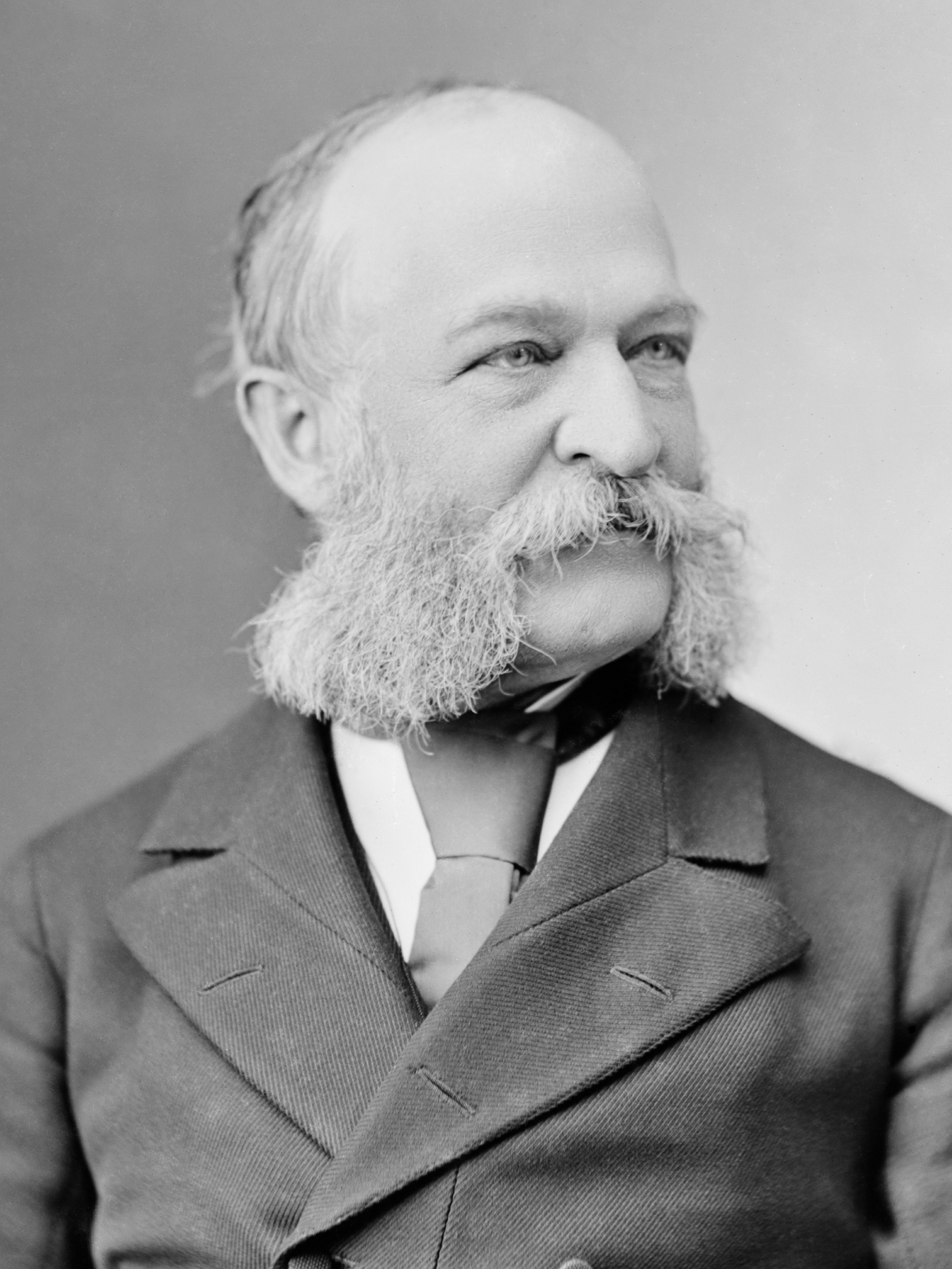
Levi P. Morton becomes the 22nd U.S. vice president

- January 1 – A total solar eclipse is seen over parts of California and Nevada.
- January 4 – An Act to Regulate Appointments in the Marine Hospital Service of the United States is signed by President Grover Cleveland. It establishes a Commissioned Corps of officers as a predecessor to the current U.S. Public Health Service Commissioned Corps.
- January 8 – Herman Hollerith receives a patent for his electric tabulating machine, which will be used in the 1890 United States census.
- January 15 – The Coca-Cola Company, at this time known as the Pemberton Medicine Company, is incorporated in Atlanta, Georgia.
- January 22 – Columbia Phonograph is formed in Washington, DC.
- February 15 – The Secretary of Agriculture is raised to a Cabinet-level position.
- February 22 – President Grover Cleveland signs the Enabling Act that plans to admit North Dakota, South Dakota, Montana and Washington as U.S. states.
- March – A German naval force shells a village in Samoa, destroying some American property; three American warships enter the Samoan harbor and prepare to fire on the three German warships found there. Before guns are fired, a hurricane blows in and sinks all the ships, American and German. A compulsory armistice is called because of the lack of warships.
- March 2 – Congress proclaims the entire Bering Sea, an important seal breeding area, to be under US control.
- March 4 – Benjamin Harrison is sworn in as the 23rd president of the United States, and Levi P. Morton is sworn in as the 22nd vice president of the United States.
- March 11
  - The North Carolina Legislature issues a charter for the creation of Elon College.
  - Orange County, California is created.

=== April–June ===
- April 22 – At high noon in Oklahoma Territory, thousands rush to claim land in the Land Rush of 1889. Within hours the cities of Oklahoma City and Guthrie are formed, with populations of at least 10,000.
- May 15 – In Samoa, 3 U.S. and 3 German ships sink in a typhoon because the captains refuse to leave before the others; almost 200 drown. The British steamer Calliope saves itself by pushing into the wind with full speed.
- May 30 – A tornado crossing West Virginia kills two.
- May 31 – Johnstown Flood: The South Fork Dam collapses in western Pennsylvania, killing more than 2,200 people in and around Johnstown, Pennsylvania.
- June 3 – The first long distance electric power transmission line in the United States is completed, running 14 miles between a generator at Willamette Falls and downtown Portland, Oregon.
- June 6 – The Great Seattle Fire ravages through the downtown area without any fatalities.

=== July–September ===
- July 7 – Great Bakersfield Fire of 1889 devastates Bakersfield, California, destroying 196 buildings and killing one person.
- July 8
  - The first issue of The Wall Street Journal is published in New York City.
  - The last official bare-knuckle boxing title fight ever held as Heavyweight Champion John L. Sullivan, the "Boston Strong Boy", defeats Jake Kilrain in a world championship bout lasting 75 rounds in Mississippi.
- August 1 – The New Hampshire Legislature issues a charter for incorporation of the Order of Saint Benedict of New Hampshire, foundation of Saint Anselm College.
- September 18 – The influential Hull House settlement house opens in Chicago.
- September – Sherman Day Thacher opens The Thacher School, one of America's oldest and most unique boarding high schools, to a small group of students in the mountains of Ojai, California.

=== October–December ===
- October 2 – The first International Conference of American States begins in Washington, D.C.
- November 2 – North Dakota and South Dakota become the 39th and 40th states, respectively (see History of North Dakota) and (see History of South Dakota).
- November 8 – Montana becomes the 41st state (see History of Montana).
- November 11 – Washington becomes the 42nd state (see History of Washington (state)).
- November 14 – Pioneer woman journalist Nellie Bly (Elizabeth Cochrane) begins an attempt to beat travel around the world in less than 80 days, inspired by Jules Verne; she finishes the journey in 72 days, 6 hours and 11 minutes.
- November 23 – The first jukebox goes into operation at the Palais Royale Saloon in San Francisco.
- November 27 – Clemson University is founded in Clemson, South Carolina.
- December 14 – In college football, Wofford and Furman play the first intercollegiate football game in the state of South Carolina, starting the Furman–Wofford football rivalry.
- December 1–31 – With 15.80 inches (401.3 mm) of rainfall, Los Angeles has its wettest calendar month since records began in 1877.

=== Undated ===
- The Indian Religious Code is created, which forbids Native Americans to practice their religions.
- The first West Virginia tornado is recorded.
- Brook trout introduced into the upper Firehole River, Yellowstone National Park.
- Valentine-Seaver Company, a furniture manufacturer is co-founded in Chicago.
- Samuel Marinus Zwemer co-founds the American Arabian Mission.
- Schools founded include:
  - Plattsburgh Normal School (Plattsburgh, New York)
  - Riverside Elementary School (Wichita, Kansas)
  - Battle Ground Academy Franklin, Tennessee.

=== Ongoing ===
- Gilded Age (1869–c. 1896)

== Sport ==
- October 29 – The New York Giants win their second consecutive World Series title by beating the Brooklyn Bridegrooms, 3–2, for their fifth straight win in taking the series 6 games to 3.
- November 30 - Princeton wins the Consensus College Football National Championship

== Births ==
- January 1 – Charles Bickford, actor (died 1967)
- January 2 – Walter Baldwin, character actor (died 1977)
- January 11 – Calvin Bridges, geneticist (died 1938)
- January 20 – Allan Lockheed, aviation pioneer and engineer (died 1969)
- February 12 – Edward Hanson, 28th Governor of American Samoa (died 1959)
- February 23
  - Victor Fleming, film director, cinematographer, and producer (died 1949)
  - John Gilbert Winant, American politician (died 1949)
- February 25 – Homer S. Ferguson, U.S. Senator from Michigan from 1943 to 1955 (died 1982)
- March 4 – Oren E. Long, U.S. Senator from Hawaii from 1959 to 1963 (died 1965)
- March 7 – Godfrey Chevalier, naval aviation pioneer (died 1922)
- March 8 – Oscar R. Ewing, lawyer, politician, and social reformer (died 1980)
- March 21 – Frederick Osborn, philanthropist and eugenicist (died 1981)
- March 31 – Muriel Hazel Wright, Oklahoma author and historian (died 1975)
- April 15 – A. Philip Randolph, African American labor union leader (died 1979)
- April 18 – Harold Saxton Burr, scientist (died 1973)
- April 21
  - A. J. Balaban, Russian-American businessman, co-founded Balaban and Katz (died 1962)
  - Walter Costello, gangster (died 1917)
  - S. W. Harrington, American football player, coach, and physician (died 1975)
- May 4 – Francis Spellman, sixth Archbishop of New York from 1939 to 1967 (died 1967)
- May 18 – Thomas Midgley Jr., mechanical and chemical engineer (died 1944)
- May 20 – Felix Arndt, pianist and composer (died 1918)
- June 1 – James Daugherty, author, illustrator and painter (died 1974)
- June 4
  - James O. McKinsey, accountant and pioneer of management consulting (died 1937)
  - Henry F. Phillips, businessman and inventor (died 1958)
- June 18 – Prentiss M. Brown, U.S. Senator from Michigan from 1936 to 1943 (died 1973)
- June 28 – Frank Mayo, actor (died 1963)
- July 3 – Richard Cramer, actor (died 1960)
- July 19 – William Andrew Paton, accountancy scholar (died 1991)
- July 29 – Vladimir Kosma Zworykin, Russian-American physicist (died 1982)
- August 11 – Ross T. McIntire, naval surgeon (died 1960)
- September 2 – George H. Plympton, screenwriter (died 1972)
- October 1 – Dutch Sterrett, baseball player (died 1965)
- November 19 – Clifton Webb, actor, dancer and singer (died 1966)
- November 20 – Edwin Hubble, astronomer (died 1953)
- December 11 – Walter Knott, farmer, creator of Knott's Berry Farm (died 1981)

== Deaths ==
- January 13 – Solomon Bundy, politician (born 1823)
- February 3 – Belle Starr, outlaw (born 1848)
- February 11 – Henry Jackson Hunt, chief of artillery in the Army of the Potomac during the American Civil War (born 1819)
- March 8 – John Ericsson, mechanical engineer and inventor (born 1803 in Sweden)
- March 14 – Adonijah Welch, U.S. Senator from Florida from 1868 to 1869 (born 1821)
- March 15 – Melville Reuben Bissell, entrepreneur, inventor of the Carpet sweeper (born 1843)
- April 30 – William Henry Barnum, U.S. Senator from Connecticut from 1876 to 1879 (born 1818)
- May 9 – William S. Harney, general (born 1800)
- June 26
  - Simon Cameron, journalist, editor and 26th United States Secretary of War from 1861 to 1862 (born 1799)
  - Lucy Hayes, First Lady of the United States as wife of Rutherford B. Hayes (born 1831)
- July 10 – Joseph Projectus Machebeuf, French-American Catholic missionary and first Bishop of Denver (born 1812)
- September 16 – Bob Younger, outlaw (born 1853)
- November 24 – George H. Pendleton, politician (born 1825)
- December 6 – Jefferson Davis, only president of the Confederate States of America from 1861 to 1865 and U.S. Senator from Mississippi from 1847 to 1851 and from 1857 to 1861 (born 1808)
- December 10 – Oliver Johnson, abolitionist editor (born 1809)

== See also ==
- Timeline of United States history (1860–1899)
