= 1934 Nevada gubernatorial election =

- November 6, 1934
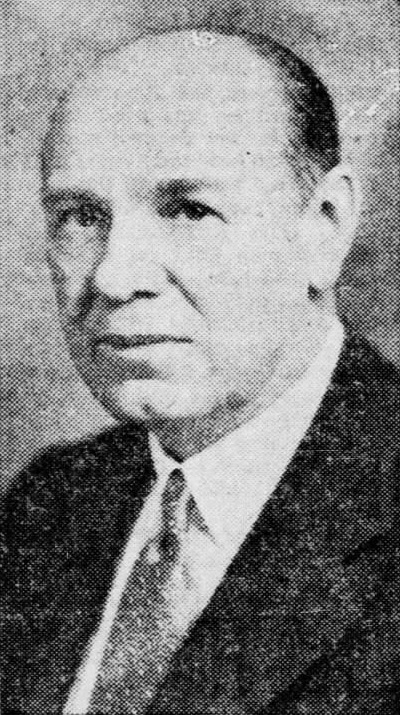

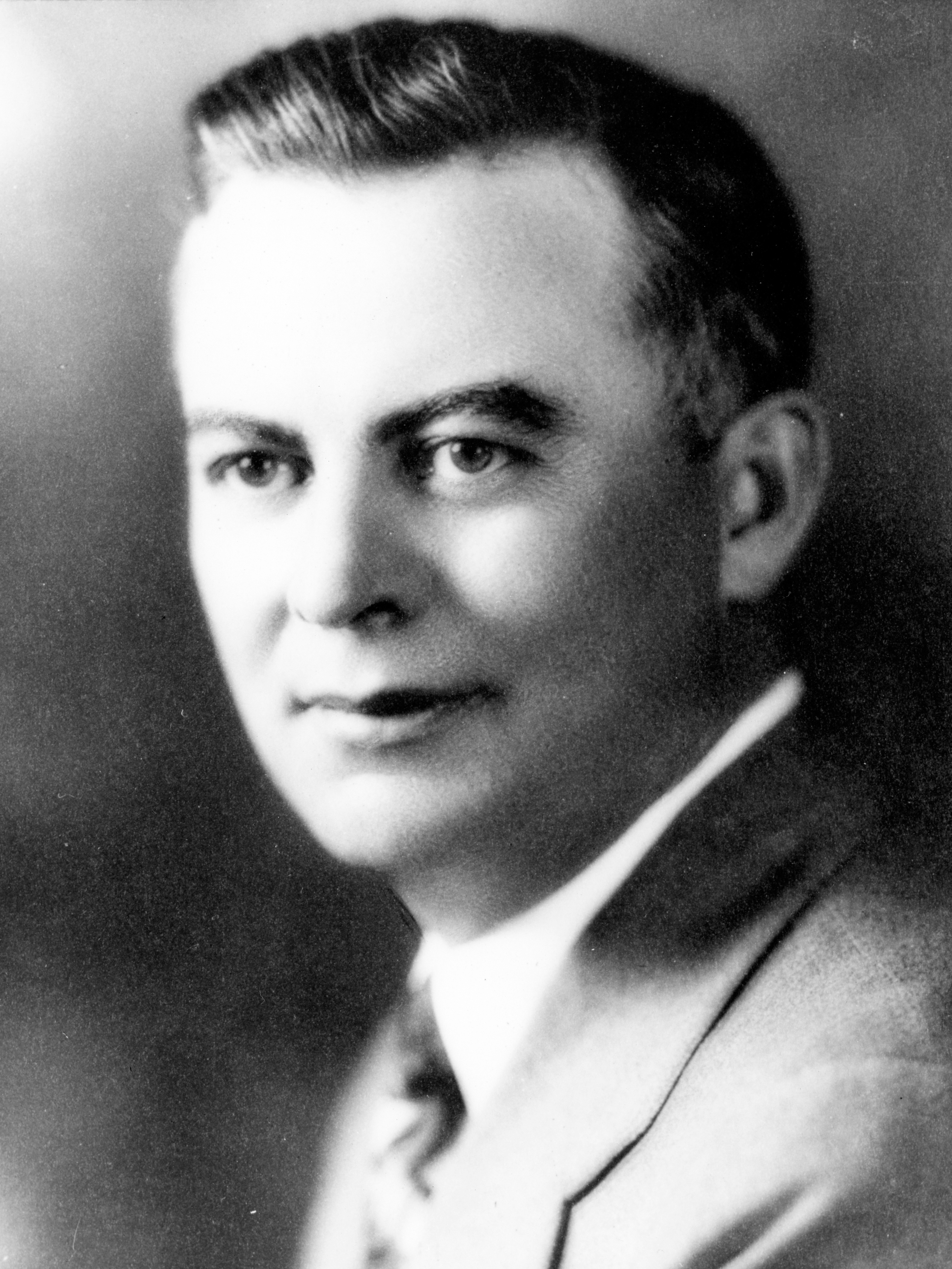

Nominee	Richard Kirman Sr.	Morley Griswold	Lindley C. Branson
Party	Democratic	Republican	Independent
Popular vote	23,088	14,778	4,940
Percentage	53.94%	34.52%	11.54%
- County results Kirman: 40–50% 50–60% 60–70% 70–80% Griswold: 40–50% 50–60% Branson: 30–40% 40–50%
Governor before election
Morley Griswold
Republican
Elected Governor
Richard Kirman Sr.
Democratic

The 1934 Nevada gubernatorial election was held on November 6, 1934. Democratic nominee Richard Kirman Sr. defeated incumbent Republican Morley Griswold with 53.94% of the vote.

== Primary elections ==
Primary elections were held on September 4, 1934.

=== Democratic primary ===
==== Candidates ====
- Richard Kirman Sr., former Mayor of Reno
- Harley A. Harmon, Chairman of the Nevada Public Service Commission
- John A. Cooper
- Archie C. Grant
- Maurice J. Sullivan, former Lieutenant Governor
- Charles L. Richards, former U.S. Representative

==== Results ====
Democratic primary results
Party	Candidate	Votes	%
Democratic	Richard Kirman Sr.	6,058	32.44
Democratic	Harley A. Harmon	5,574	29.85
Democratic	John A. Cooper	2,028	10.86
Democratic	Archie C. Grant	1,849	9.90
Democratic	Maurice J. Sullivan	1,632	8.74
Democratic	Charles L. Richards	1,531	8.20
Total votes		18,672	100.00

== General election ==
=== Candidates ===
Major party candidates

- Richard Kirman Sr., Democratic
- Morley Griswold, Republican

Other candidates

- Lindley C. Branson, Independent

=== Results ===
1934 Nevada gubernatorial election
Party	Candidate	Votes	%	±%
Democratic	Richard Kirman Sr.	23,088	53.94%	+7.18%
Republican	Morley Griswold (incumbent)	14,778	34.52%	−18.73%
Independent	Lindley C. Branson	4,940	11.54%	+11.54%
Majority		8,310	19.41%	
Total votes		42,806	100.00%	
Democratic gain from Republican		Swing	+25.91%	

=== Results by county ===
County	Richard Kirman Sr. Democratic		Morley Griswold Republican		Lindley C. Branson Independent		Margin		Total votes cast
County	#	%	#	%	#	%	#	%	Total votes cast
Churchill	1,347	57.79%	644	27.63%	340	14.59%	703	30.16%	2,331
Clark	3,829	61.27%	1,875	30.00%	545	8.72%	1,954	31.27%	6,249
Douglas	394	49.07%	397	49.44%	12	1.49%	-3	-0.37%	803
Elko	1,733	43.46%	1,846	46.29%	409	10.26%	-113	2.83%	3,988
Esmeralda	453	68.95%	156	23.74%	48	7.31%	297	45.21%	657
Eureka	213	35.15%	179	29.54%	214	35.31%	-1	-0.17%	606
Humboldt	815	49.73%	592	36.12%	232	14.15%	223	13.61%	1,639
Lander	476	57.35%	274	33.01%	80	9.64%	202	24.34%	830
Lincoln	960	53.93%	612	34.38%	208	11.69%	348	19.55%	1,780
Lyon	1,003	56.96%	708	40.20%	50	2.84%	295	16.75%	1,761
Mineral	598	57.06%	384	36.64%	66	6.30%	214	20.42%	1,048
Nye	1,045	54.51%	572	29.84%	300	15.65%	473	24.67%	1,917
Ormsby	680	55.37%	531	43.24%	17	1.38%	149	12.13%	1,228
Pershing	596	52.65%	340	30.04%	196	17.31%	256	22.61%	1,132
Storey	393	71.85%	138	25.23%	16	2.93%	255	46.62%	547
Washoe	7,729	60.32%	4,402	34.35%	683	5.33%	3,327	25.96%	12,814
White Pine	824	23.71%	1,128	32.45%	1,524	43.84%	-396 (Note: Margin over Griswold)	-11.39%	3,476
Totals	23,088	53.94%	14,778	34.52%	4,940	11.54%	8,310	19.41%	42,806

==== Counties that flipped from Republican to Democratic ====
- Churchill
- Lander
- Lyon
- Mineral
- Ormsby
- Washoe

==== Counties that flipped from Republican to Independent ====
- White Pine

==== Counties that flipped from Democratic to Independent ====
- Eureka
