= Gilbert C. Ross =

American politician from Nevada (1878–1947)

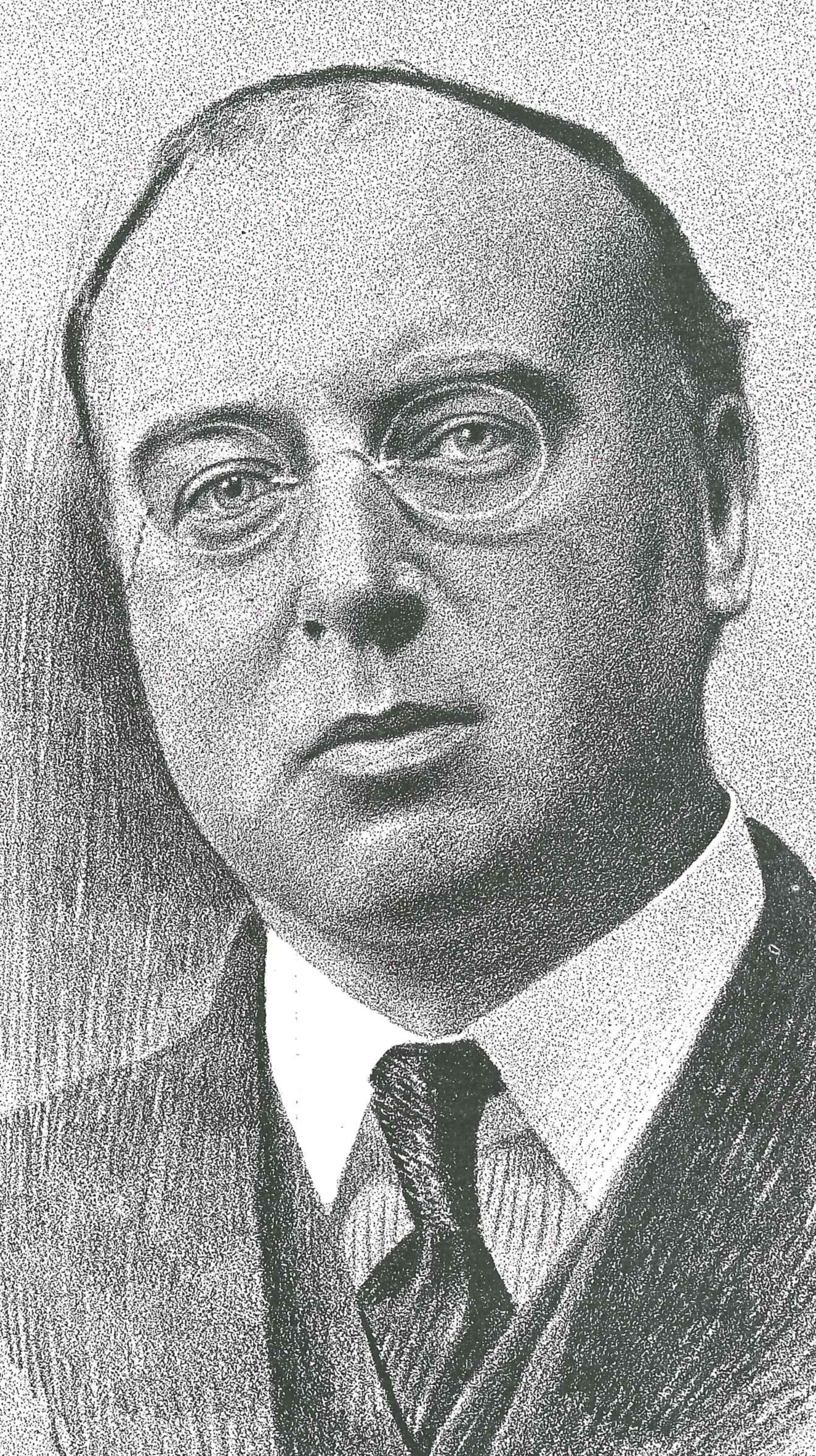

14th Lieutenant Governor of Nevada
- In office January 2, 1911 – January 4, 1915
- Governor: Tasker Oddie
- Preceded by: Vacant
- Succeeded by: Maurice J. Sullivan

Personal details
- Born: June 5, 1878 Virginia City, Nevada, U.S.
- Died: October 9, 1947 (aged 69) Reno, Nevada, U.S.
- Party: Democratic

Gilbert Cary Ross (June 5, 1878 – October 9, 1947) was an American politician who served as the 14th lieutenant governor of Nevada as a member of the Democratic Party from January 2, 1911, to January 4, 1915.

== Early life ==
Ross was born in Virginia City, Nevada on June 5, 1878, to Hugh Fraser Ross and Maude French. His father was a mechanical engineer and an immigrant from Scotland, while his mother was a member of the pioneer Comstock family. Ross graduated high school in his home city, before enrolling at the University of Nevada School of Mines. Ross however, cut his education short to become a teacher at grammar and high schools in 1890. By 1895, Ross was appointed principal of the Virginia City High School, a position which he would fulfill until 1900. That year, Ross became interested in the south Nevada mining boom and subsequently moved to Tonopah, Nevada, where he became a bank teller and engaged in several mining ventures.

== Political career ==
Governor John Sparks appointed Ross as deputy superintendent of public instruction. Ross held this position for three years before he sought elected office and ran as the Democratic nominee for lieutenant governor in the 1910 election. Ross won the three way election with 48.40% of the vote, assuming office on January 2, 1911. The coinciding gubernatorial election was however won by Republican nominee Tasker Oddie, which caused frictions between Oddie and Ross. When incumbent attorney general of Nevada Cleveland H. Baker died in office on December 5, 1912, Governor Oddie was out of state in San Francisco, which meant that Ross was serving as acting governor in Oddie's absence. Ross then quickly appointed fellow Democrat George B. Thatcher to fill the vacancy, so Governor Oddie would be prevented from appointing a Republican to the seat. Ross did not seek re-election in 1914 and instead returned to his mining interests.

But as Governor Oddie lost his re-election bid to Democrat Emmet D. Boyle, the newly inaugurated Boyle appointed Ross state bank examiner. Ross handled the receivership of the State Banking & Trust Co. of Tonopah, Nevada until Democrats lost the Governorship following the 1926 gubernatorial election. Ross returned to his mining ventures, but kept his political interests alive as he would go on to be named state administrator for the federal Works Progress Administration in Nevada in 1934. He held this position until the agency ended in 1943. In 1942, Ross managed former governor's James G. Scrugham's successful bid for U.S. senate in 1942. In 1944, Ross was also in charge of incumbent lieutenant governor Vail Pittman's unsuccessful primary challenge against incumbent U.S. Senator Pat McCarran. But when incumbent U.S. senator James G. Scrugham died in office on June 23, 1945, incumbent governor Edward P. Carville resigned on July 24, 1945, elevating Pittman to the governorship so that he could appoint his predecessor to fill the vacant senate seat. As governor, Pittman would appoint Ross to head the state employment security department. Ross, in turn, campaigned for Pittman in his bid for a full term in 1946.

== Death ==
Ross was staying at the Golden hotel in Reno, Nevada on October 9, 1947, when he called a doctor in the early morning, complaining of chest pains. A short time later, Ross asked a bell boy to bring him some medicine. But by the time the bell boy arrived at his room with the medicine, Ross had already passed away from a heart attack aged 69. Ross never married and was instead remembered by his many friends and acquaintances during his funeral service on October 11, 1947. Among his pallbearers were incumbent governor Vail Pittman, former governor Richard Kirman Sr. and former governor and U.S. senator Tasker Oddie. Ross was buried at Mountain View Cemetery in Reno, Nevada.

== See also ==
- List of lieutenant governors of Nevada

Political offices
Preceded by Vacant	Lieutenant Governor of Nevada; 1911-1915	Succeeded by Maurice J. Sullivan
