= Roswell K. Colcord =

American politician

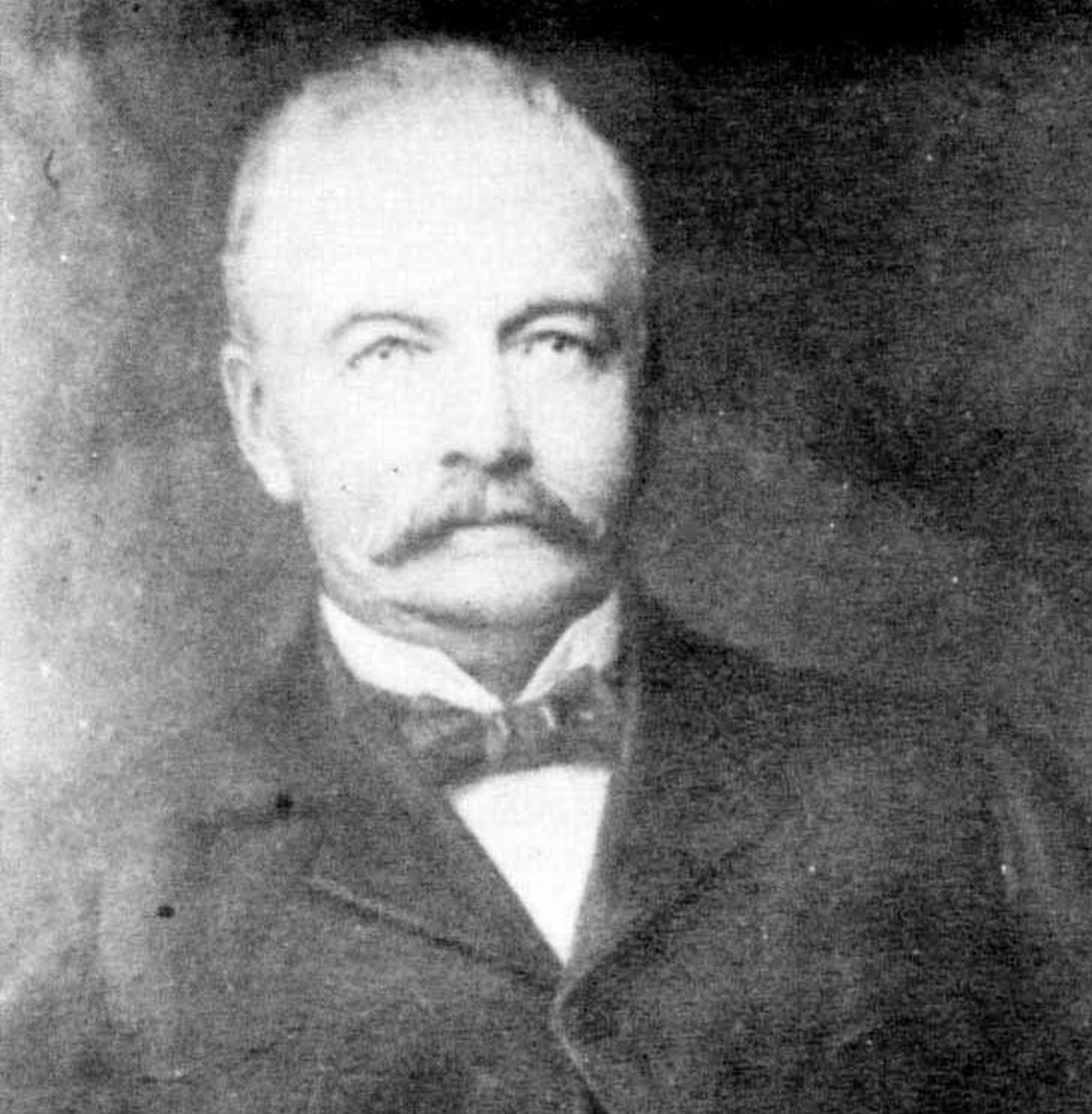

7th Governor of Nevada
- In office January 5, 1891 – January 7, 1895
- Lieutenant: Joseph Poujade
- Preceded by: Frank Bell
- Succeeded by: John E. Jones

Personal details
- Born: Roswell Keyes Colcord; April 25, 1839 Searsport, Maine, U.S.
- Died: October 30, 1939 (aged 100) Carson City, Nevada, U.S.
- Resting place: Lone Mountain Cemetery, Carson City
- Party: Republican
- Spouse: Mary E. Hopkins (m. 1868)
- Children: 3

Roswell Keyes Colcord (April 25, 1839 – October 30, 1939) was an American politician who served as the seventh governor of Nevada from 1891 to 1895. He was a member of the Republican Party.

He was born on April 25, 1839, in Searsport, Maine. He attended public schools where he studied Mechanical Engineering and he found work in a shipyard as a carpenter. He married Mary E. Hopkins on April 28, 1868, in Virginia City, Nevada, and they had three children, Stella, Harry, and Ethel.

== Career ==
Colcord moved west to California in 1856, to Aurora, Nevada, in 1860, and to Virginia City, Nevada, in 1863. He became a successful mining engineer. He also set up a law practice and became one of the top attorneys in the state. He was also involved in the building of bridges and mills. He was selected as a commissioner to represent Nevada at the Paris Expedition in 1889.

Elected as governor in 1890, Colcord strengthened the state's economy and also signed the state's first admissions day bill. He was the first Nevada governor to support Women's Suffrage. During his tenure, a state board of health was established, a mechanical engineering department was initiated in the University of Nevada, and a first state board of equalization was authorized.

After his term as governor, Colcord was named Superintendent of the United States Mint's Carson City Mint, a position he held from 1898 to 1911. At that time, the Mint did not produce money, but was a shipping point for bullion.

== Death ==
Colcord was in relatively good health at the time of his death on October 30, 1939, at the age of 100 in Carson City, Nevada. He is interred at the Lone Mountain Cemetery in Carson City, Nevada.

Party political offices
Preceded by Charles C. Stevenson	Republican nominee for Governor of Nevada; 1890	Succeeded by Abner C. Cleveland
Political offices
Preceded by Frank Bell	Governor of Nevada; 1891 – 1895	Succeeded by John E. Jones
Honorary titles
Preceded by Adelbert Ames	Oldest living United States governor April 12, 1933 – October 30, 1939	Succeeded by Martin F. Ansel
Preceded by Nathaniel S. Berry	Oldest United States governor ever February 2, 1937 – June 5, 1977	Succeeded by Nellie Tayloe Ross
