= Governor Griswold =

Governor Griswold may refer to:

- Dwight Griswold (1893–1954), 25th Governor of Nebraska
- Matthew Griswold (governor) (1714–1799), 17th Governor of Connecticut
- Morley Griswold (1890–1951), 16th Governor of Nevada
- Roger Griswold (1762–1812), 22nd Governor of Connecticut
