= 1890 Nevada gubernatorial election =

- November 4, 1890
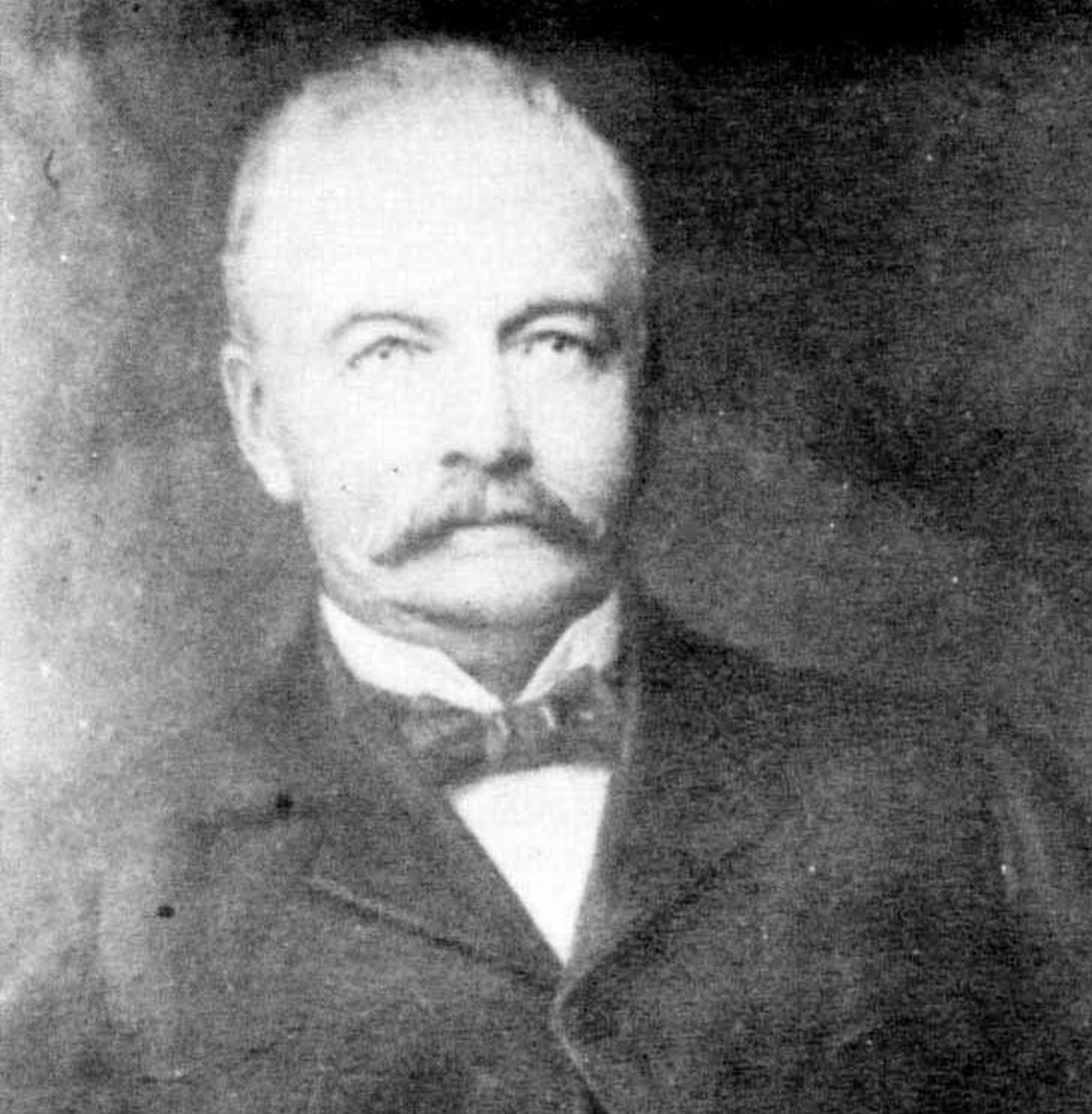

Nominee	Roswell K. Colcord	Theodore Winters
Party	Republican	Democratic
Popular vote	6,601	5,791
Percentage	53.27%	46.73%
- County results Colcord: 50–60% 60–70% Winters: 50–60%
Governor before election
Frank Bell
Republican
Elected Governor
Roswell K. Colcord
Republican

The 1890 Nevada gubernatorial election was held on November 4, 1890.

Republican nominee Roswell K. Colcord defeated Democratic nominee Theodore Winters with 53.27% of the vote.

== General election ==
=== Candidates ===
Major party candidates

- Theodore Winters, Democratic, former territorial representative, stockman, rancher and racehorse owner
- Roswell K. Colcord, Republican, Nevada State Commissioner to the 1889 Paris Exposition

=== Results ===
1890 Nevada gubernatorial election
Party	Candidate	Votes	%	±%
Republican	Roswell K. Colcord	6,601	53.27%	+0.86%
Democratic	Theodore Winters	5,791	46.73%	−0.86%
Majority		810	6.54%	
Total votes		12,392	100.00%	
Republican hold		Swing	+1.72%	

=== Results by county ===
County	Roswell K. Colcord Republican		Theodore Winters Democratic		Margin		Total votes cast
County	#	%	#	%	#	%	Total votes cast
Churchill	83	46.63%	95	53.37%	-12	-6.74%	178
Douglas	255	55.80%	202	44.20%	53	11.60%	457
Elko	649	44.82%	799	55.18%	-150	-10.36%	1,448
Esmeralda	486	61.52%	304	38.48%	182	23.04%	790
Eureka	507	53.82%	435	46.18%	72	7.64%	942
Humboldt	319	40.74%	464	59.26%	-145	-18.52%	783
Lander	288	51.34%	273	48.66%	15	2.67%	561
Lincoln	253	48.37%	270	51.63%	-17	-3.25%	523
Lyon	352	50.65%	343	49.35%	9	1.29%	695
Nye	150	48.54%	159	51.46%	-9	-2.91%	309
Ormsby	612	67.18%	299	32.82%	313	34.36%	911
Storey	1,524	58.04%	1,102	41.96%	422	16.07%	2,626
Washoe	846	50.27%	837	49.73%	9	0.53%	1,683
White Pine	277	57.00%	209	43.00%	68	13.99%	486
Totals	6,601	53.27%	5,791	46.73%	810	6.54%	12,392

==== Counties that flipped from Democratic to Republican ====
- Ormsby
- Storey

==== Counties that flipped from Republican to Democratic ====
- Churchill
- Elko
