= Fred B. Balzar =

19/20th-century American politician; 15th Governor of Nevada (1927–34)

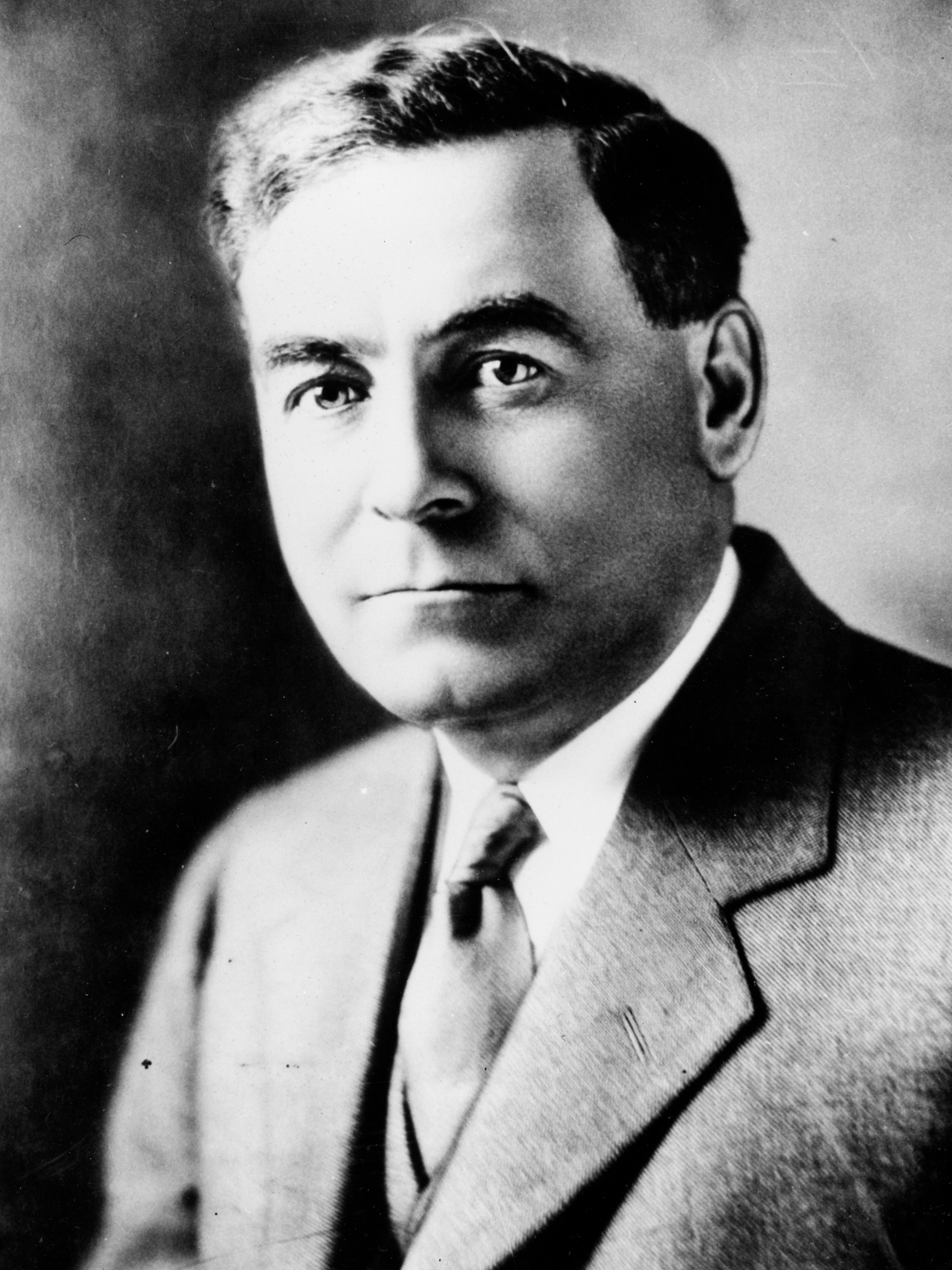
- Balzar c. 1927–1934

15th Governor of Nevada
- In office January 3, 1927 – March 21, 1934
- Lieutenant: Morley Griswold
- Preceded by: James G. Scrugham
- Succeeded by: Morley Griswold

Personal details
- Born: Frederick Bennett Balzar; June 15, 1880 Virginia City, Nevada, U.S.
- Died: March 21, 1934 (aged 53) Carson City, Nevada, U.S.
- Resting place: Masonic Memorial Gardens; Reno, Nevada, U.S.
- Party: Republican
- Spouse: Edna Idelle Sinnamon
- Children: 1
- Profession: Lawyer

Frederick Bennett Balzar (June 15, 1880 – March 21, 1934) was an American politician and lawyer. He was the 15th governor of Nevada. He was a member of the Republican Party.

== Biography ==
Balzar was born in Virginia City, Nevada. He attended school in Nevada, and graduated from San Francisco Polytechnic High School. Balzar worked at a variety of occupations, including stagecoach driving, ranching, railroading, mining, and insurance.

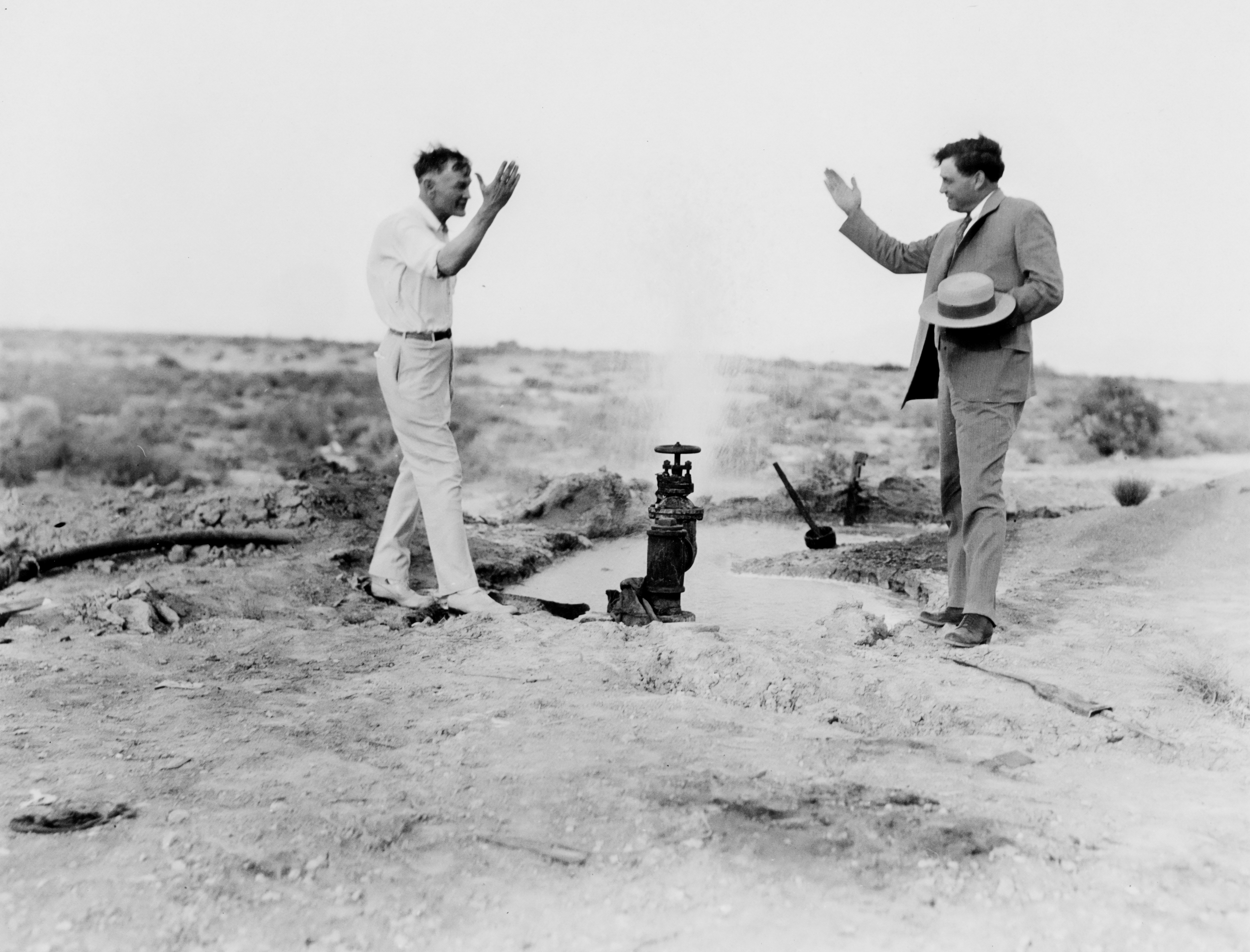
Balzar (right) with the mayor of Las Vegas, J. Fred Hesse (left), at a construction site in 1930.

A Republican, he served in the Nevada Assembly from 1905 to 1906, and the Nevada Senate from 1909 to 1916,. He was sheriff and county assessor of Mineral County from 1917 to 1926, and chairman of the Nevada Republican Party from 1924 to 1925.

Balzar won the race for governor in 1926, defeating incumbent James G. Scrugham. He was re-elected in 1930.

In 1931, Balzar signed into law Assembly Bill 98, which allowed for wide-open gambling in Nevada.

After a lengthy illness Balzar died in the governor's mansion in Carson City on March 21, 1934. He shared a close friendship with comedian Will Rogers, who eulogized him as "a real two-fisted governor."

Party political offices
Preceded by John H. Miller	Republican nominee for Governor of Nevada; 1926, 1930	Succeeded by Morley Griswold
Political offices
Preceded by James G. Scrugham	Governor of Nevada; 1927–1934	Succeeded by Morley Griswold
