= 1886 Nevada gubernatorial election =

- November 2, 1886

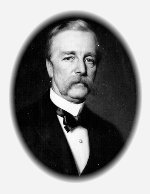
Nominee	Charles C. Stevenson	Jewett W. Adams
Party	Republican	Democratic
Popular vote	6,463	5,869
Percentage	52.41%	47.59%
- County results Stevenson: 50–60% 60–70% Adams: 50–60%
Governor before election
Jewett W. Adams
Democratic
Elected Governor
Charles C. Stevenson
Republican

The 1886 Nevada gubernatorial election was held on November 2, 1886.

Republican nominee Charles C. Stevenson defeated incumbent Democratic Governor Jewett W. Adams with 52.41% of the vote.

== General election ==
=== Candidates ===
Major party candidates

- Jewett W. Adams, Democratic, incumbent Governor
- Charles C. Stevenson, Republican, Regent of the University of Nevada

=== Results ===
1886 Nevada gubernatorial election
Party	Candidate	Votes	%	±%
Republican	Charles C. Stevenson	6,463	52.41%	+6.73%
Democratic	Jewett W. Adams (incumbent)	5,869	47.59%	−6.73%
Majority		594	4.82%	
Total votes		12,332	100.00%	
Republican gain from Democratic		Swing	+13.46%	

=== Results by county ===
County	Charles C. Stevenson Republican		Jewett W. Adams Democratic		Margin		Total votes cast
County	#	%	#	%	#	%	Total votes cast
Churchill	100	51.02%	96	48.98%	4	2.04%	196
Douglas	251	60.34%	165	39.66%	86	20.67%	416
Elko	690	53.12%	609	46.88%	81	6.24%	1,299
Esmeralda	446	59.47%	304	40.53%	142	18.93%	750
Eureka	615	54.38%	516	45.62%	99	8.75%	1,131
Humboldt	445	47.14%	499	52.86%	-54	-5.72%	944
Lander	381	53.74%	328	46.26%	53	7.48%	709
Lincoln	157	44.48%	196	55.52%	-39	-11.05%	353
Lyon	389	56.21%	303	43.79%	86	12.43%	692
Nye	181	45.48%	217	54.52%	-36	-9.05%	398
Ormsby	442	49.22%	456	50.78%	-14	-1.56%	898
Storey	1,233	48.33%	1,318	51.67%	-85	-3.33%	2,551
Washoe	761	55.87%	601	44.13%	160	11.75%	1,362
White Pine	372	58.77%	261	41.23%	111	17.54%	633
Totals	6,463	52.41%	5,869	47.59%	594	4.82%	12,332

==== Counties that flipped from Democratic to Republican ====
- Churchill
- Douglas
- Elko
- Eureka
- Lander
- Lyon
- White Pine
