= Charles C. Stevenson =

American politician

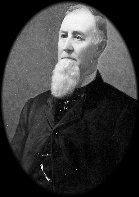

5th Governor of Nevada
- In office January 3, 1887 – September 21, 1890
- Lieutenant: Henry C. Davis; Samuel W. Chubbuck; Frank Bell
- Preceded by: Jewett W. Adams
- Succeeded by: Frank Bell

Member of the Nevada Senate

Personal details
- Born: Charles Clark Stevenson; February 20, 1826 Phelps, New York, U.S.
- Died: September 21, 1890 (aged 64) Carson City, Nevada, U.S.
- Resting place: Mountain View Cemetery (Oakland, California)
- Party: Republican
- Spouses: Margaret M. Rogers (m. 1848; div. 1880) Ellen Mary Frary (m. 1881)
- Children: 2

Charles Clark Stevenson (February 20, 1826 – September 21, 1890) was an American politician who was the fifth governor of Nevada. He was a member of the Republican Party.

He was born on February 20, 1826, in Phelps, New York. His education was from the common schools of Canada and Michigan. He married Margaret M. Rogers in November 1848 and they had two sons, Edward and Lou. They were divorced in 1880 in Virginia City, Storey County, Nevada. He then married Ellen Mary Frary on June 20, 1881, in San Francisco, San Francisco County, California.

== Career ==
In 1859 Stevenson arrived in Ophir (later Virginia City), Nevada, where he worked in mining, milling, and agriculture. He became part-owner of the Cooper and Stevenson quartz mine.

Stevenson was elected to Nevada Senate representing Storey County, serving three terms. He was a delegate to the Republican National Convention in 1872 and 1884. Elected regent of the University of Nevada, he served in that position for 11 years from 1875 to 1887.

Stevenson was elected governor in 1886, and served to 1890. During his tenure, programs were established which supported livestock and farming industries, the Stewart Indian School was created, and the University of Nevada was reconstructed. His brother, Edward A. Stevenson, was governor of Idaho at the same time.

== Death ==
Stevenson died of typhoid fever while in office on September 21, 1890, in Carson City, Nevada, at the age of 64. That made him the first Nevada governor to die while in office. He is interred at Mountain View Cemetery.

Party political offices
| Preceded by Enoch Strother | Republican nominee for Governor of Nevada; 1886 | Succeeded by Roswell K. Colcord |
Political offices
| Preceded by Jewett W. Adams | Governor of Nevada; 1887–1890 | Succeeded by Frank Bell |
