= Richard Kirman Sr. =

American politician

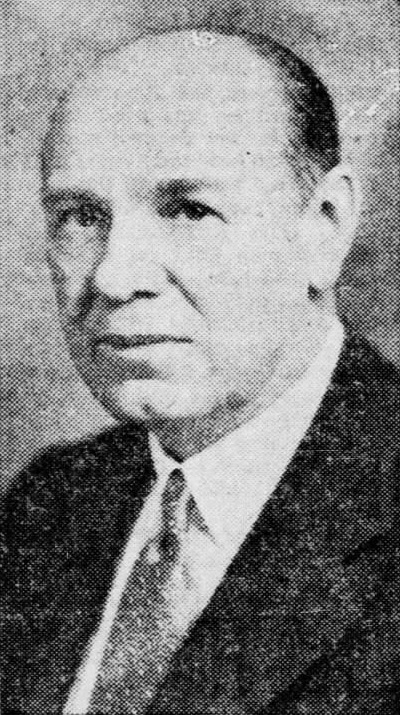

17th Governor of Nevada
- In office January 7, 1935 – January 2, 1939
- Lieutenant: Fred S. Alward
- Preceded by: Morley Griswold
- Succeeded by: Edward P. Carville

Mayor of Reno
- In office 1907–1909

Personal details
- Born: January 14, 1877 Virginia City, Nevada, U.S.
- Died: January 19, 1959 (aged 82) Carson City, Nevada, U.S.
- Resting place: Mountain View Cemetery; Reno, Nevada, U.S.
- Party: Democratic
- Spouse: Mabelle Jean King
- Children: 2

Richard Kirman Sr. (January 14, 1877 – January 19, 1959) was an American politician. He was the 17th governor of Nevada from 1935 to 1939. He was a member of the Democratic Party.

== Early life ==
Kirman was born in Virginia City, Nevada, and educated in the Nevada public schools. He graduated from Lincoln High School in San Francisco, California. In San Francisco, on January 19, 1898, he married Mabelle Jean King and the couple had two children, Richard and Claire.

== Career ==
Returning to Nevada, Kirman began working in banking. He was elected to the Nevada State Assembly in 1899. In 1902, he was appointed a member of the Board of Regents of the University of Nevada and was in that position until 1904.

Elected mayor of Reno, Nevada, Kirman served in that position from 1907 to 1909. He successfully served as President of Reno's First National Bank during the Great Depression. He continued all his life to be active in livestock, business and banking.

Winning the Democratic gubernatorial nomination in 1934, Kirman won the election and was sworn in as Governor of Nevada on January 7, 1935. Nevada's state park system was created during Kirman's administration. Also, during his tenure, the state planning board was implemented, and construction on the Hoover Dam was completed. He did not seek re-election in 1938.

== Death ==
Kirman died on January 19, 1959, in Carson City, Nevada, at the age of 82. He is interred at Mountain View Cemetery in Reno, Nevada.

== See also ==
- List of mayors of Reno, Nevada

Party political offices
Preceded by Charles L. Richards	Democratic nominee for Governor of Nevada; 1934	Succeeded by Edward P. Carville
Political offices
Preceded by	Mayor of Reno; 1907–1909	Succeeded by
Preceded by Morley Griswold	Governor of Nevada; 1935–1939	Succeeded by Edward P. Carville
