= Jewett W. Adams =

American politician

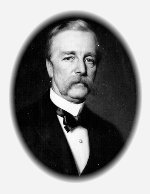

4th Governor of Nevada
- In office January 1, 1883 – January 3, 1887
- Lieutenant: Charles E. Laughton
- Preceded by: John H. Kinkead
- Succeeded by: Charles C. Stevenson

4th Lieutenant Governor of Nevada
- In office 1875–1883
- Governor: Lewis R. Bradley; John H. Kinkead
- Preceded by: Pressly C. Hyman
- Succeeded by: Charles E. Laughton

Personal details
- Born: Jewett William Adams; August 6, 1835 South Hero, Vermont, U.S.
- Died: June 18, 1920 (aged 84) San Francisco, California U.S.
- Resting place: Cypress Lawn Memorial Park; Colma, California, U.S.
- Party: Democratic
- Spouse: Emma Lee
- Children: 1 (adopted)

Jewett William Adams (August 6, 1835 – June 18, 1920) was an American politician who was the fourth governor of Nevada. He was a member of the Democratic Party.

== Biography ==
Adams was born in South Hero, Vermont. He was educated in the common schools of Vermont. He married Emma Lee on January 16, 1878, and the couple adopted a daughter, Frances R. Adams.

== Career ==
Adams worked as a merchant and a rancher before moving west with the California Gold Rush in 1851. He ran a general store in Mariposa County, California until he was hired as paymaster on the estate of John C. Fremont in 1860. In 1864, he moved to Nevada, where he worked in mining, freighting, cattle raising, and owned a general store. He was elected the fourth lieutenant governor of Nevada, serving from 1874 to 1882.

In 1882 Adams was elected Governor, serving one term from 1883 to 1887. During his tenure, the site for the University of Nevada was moved to Reno, the silver industry flourished, and railroad development was promoted.

Adams became Superintendent of the United States Mint in Carson City from 1894 to 1898. In 1896, forming a partnership with William McGill, a cattleman, he built one of the largest ranches in the state of Nevada.

== Death ==
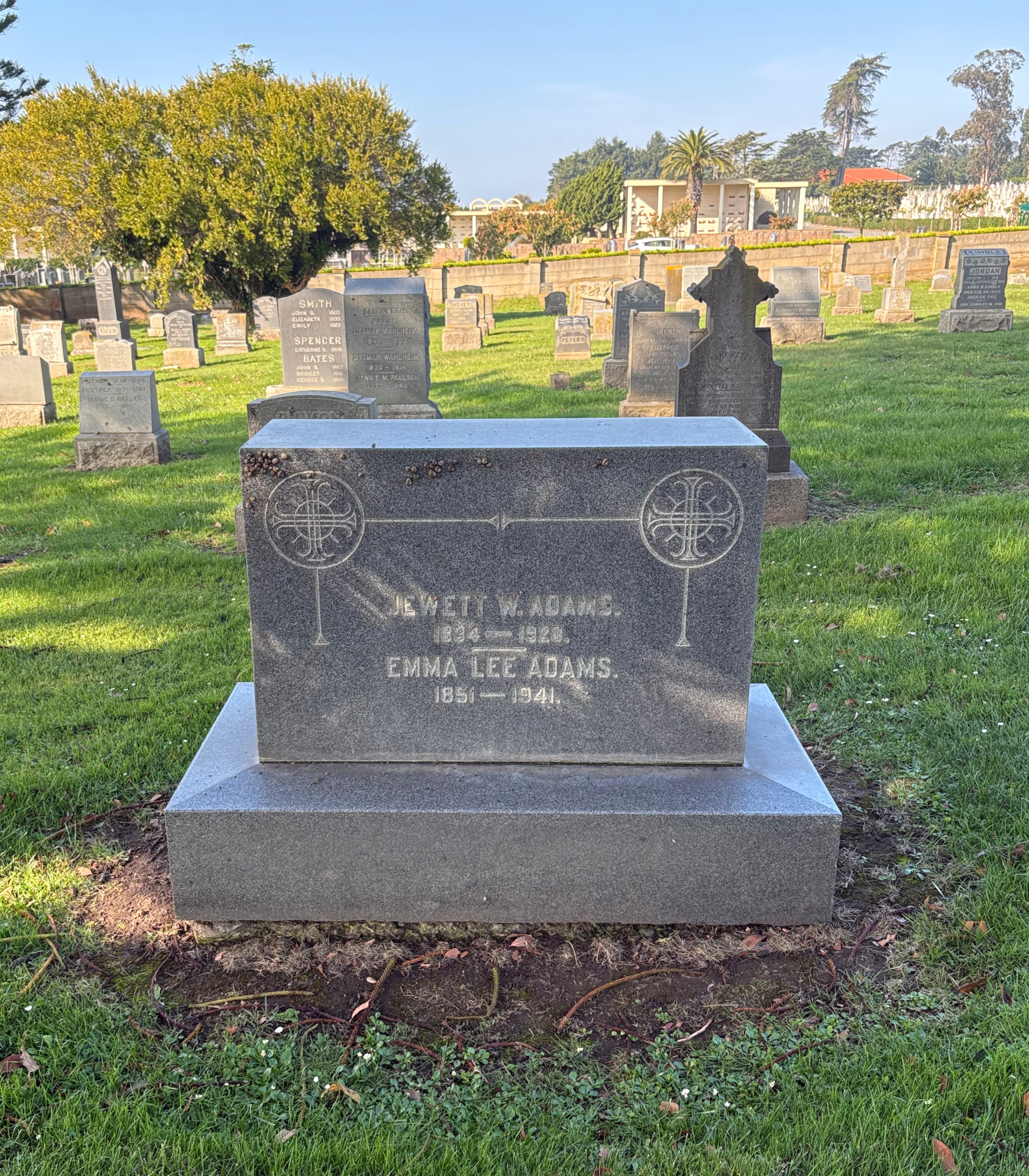
Adams's grave at Cypress Lawn Memorial Park

In 1915, Adams and his family moved to San Francisco, where he died on June 18, 1920, at the age of 84. He is interred at Cypress Lawn Memorial Park, Colma, San Mateo County, California.

Party political offices
Preceded by Lewis R. Bradley	Democratic nominee for Governor of Nevada; 1882, 1886	Succeeded by Theodore Winters
Political offices
Preceded by John H. Kinkead	Governor of Nevada; 1883 – 1887	Succeeded by Charles C. Stevenson
Preceded by Pressly C. Hyman	Lieutenant Governor of Nevada; 1875 – 1883	Succeeded by Charles E. Laughton
