= Fred S. Alward =

American politician from Nevada (1889–1987)

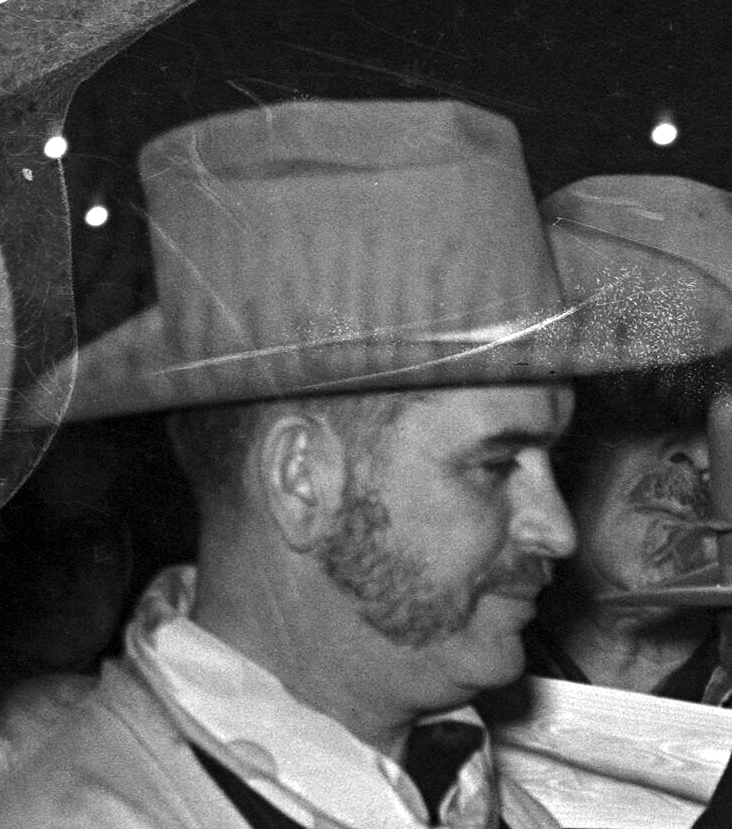

17th Lieutenant Governor of Nevada
- In office January 7, 1935 – January 2, 1939
- Governor: Richard Kirman Sr.
- Preceded by: Morley Griswold
- Succeeded by: Maurice J. Sullivan

Member of the Nevada Assembly for Clark County
- In office 1931–1935

Speaker of the Nevada Assembly
- In office 1933–1935

Personal details
- Born: November 21, 1889 New South Wales, Australia
- Died: June 25, 1987 (aged 97) Hot Springs, South Dakota, U.S.
- Party: Democratic

Frederick Searly Alward (November 21, 1889 – June 25, 1987) was an Australian-American politician who served as the 17th Lieutenant Governor of Nevada as a member of the Democratic party from 1935 to 1939.

== Early life ==
Fred S. Alward was born in New South Wales, Australia on November 21, 1889, to John Alward and Alice Maud Mary Lumley. He emigrated to the US in 1908 and became a citizen, going on to serve in the United States Armed Forces during World War I. Upon his return from the war, Alward practiced law and moved to Las Vegas, Nevada in 1926. In the 1930s, he had a male lover named Richard Ham.

== Political career ==
Fred S. Alward was first elected to the Nevada Assembly for Clark County in November 1930, taking office at the beginning of the following year. Alward was re-elected in 1932 and upon the session's beginning in 1933, he became speaker of the Assembly. During his time in office, Alward among others, sponsored a bill which would eventually lead to the legalization of gambling in the state of Nevada. He would go on to run for Lieutenant Governor of Nevada in 1934, defeating his Republican opponent on November 7, 1934, with 64.58% of the vote. Near the end of his term, Alward set his sights on the Democratic nomination for Governor of Nevada in the 1938 Nevada gubernatorial election. However, he had to drop out of the race after he was blackmailed by his political rival due to Alward's homosexuality.

== Later life and death ==
Upon reaching the end of his term as Lieutenant Governor on January 2, 1939, and following his withdrawal from the gubernatorial election, Fred S. Alward retired from politics. He instead practiced law again and bought a hotel in 1941. Ultimately, he became a rancher in Kennebec, South Dakota, owning an additional cattle business in Florida. Alward died in Hot Springs, South Dakota, on June 25, 1987. He lies buried at Black Hills National Cemetery in Sturgis, South Dakota.

== See also ==
- List of lieutenant governors of Nevada

Political offices
Preceded by Morley Griswold	Lieutenant Governor of Nevada; 1935–1939	Succeeded by Maurice J. Sullivan
