= Samuel S. Arentz =

American politician (1879–1934)

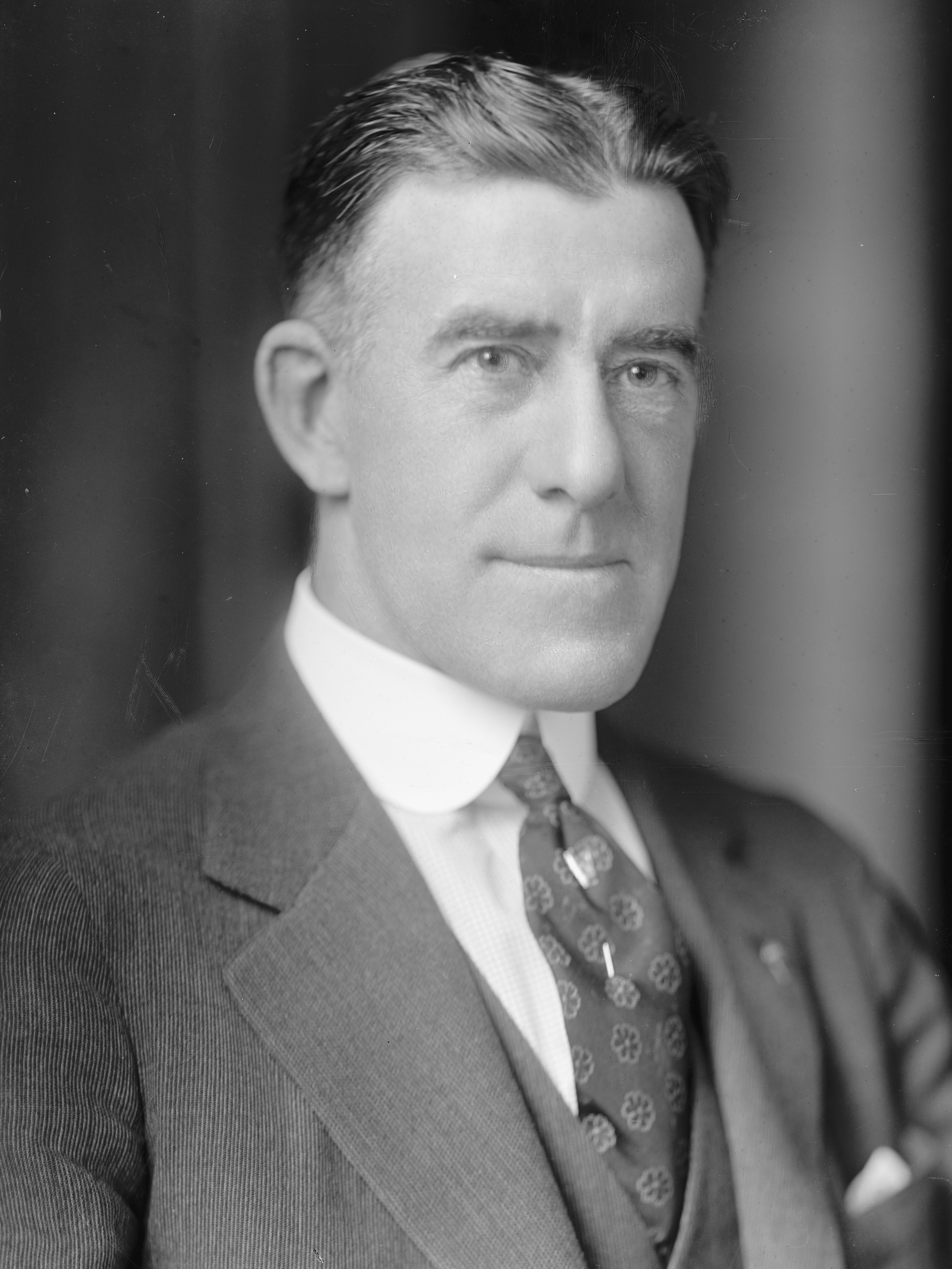

Member of the U.S. House of Representatives from Nevada's at-large district
- In office March 4, 1925 – March 3, 1933
- Preceded by: Charles L. Richards
- Succeeded by: James G. Scrugham
- In office March 4, 1921 – March 3, 1923
- Preceded by: Charles R. Evans
- Succeeded by: Charles L. Richards

Personal details
- Born: January 8, 1879 Chicago, Illinois, U.S.
- Died: June 17, 1934 (aged 55) Reno, Nevada, U.S.
- Party: Republican
- Profession: Mining

Samuel Shaw (Ulysses) Arentz (January 8, 1879 – June 17, 1934) was a United States representative from Nevada. A Republican, he served 10 years in Congress.

== Biography ==
Arentz was born in Chicago, Illinois, on January 8, 1879. He graduated from the Chicago Manual Training School in 1897 and from the South Dakota School of Mines at Rapid City in 1904. He was a member of the South Dakota National Guard at Rapid City from 1901 to 1904. He moved to Ludering, Nevada, in 1907, and to Salt Lake City, Utah, in 1912. He was engaged as surveyor, assessor, miner, and timberman in Bear Gulch and Butte, of Montana; the Bingham Canyon and Stockton, Utah; and the Lake Superior copper country, mining engineer and superintendent of mines in Idaho, Utah, Arizona, and Nevada. He also served as the chief engineer of railway companies in Nevada; a consulting engineer of the United States Bureau of Mines; a captain of Engineers, United States Army, during the First World War; and moved to a ranch in Lyon County, Nevada, near Simpson, in 1917. He was also engaged in mining and irrigation projects;

He was elected as a Republican to the Sixty-seventh Congress (March 4, 1921 to March 3, 1923). He was not renominated, and was an unsuccessful candidate in the 1922 Republican primary election for United States Senator. He was again elected as At-Large Representative from the Sixty-ninth to the three succeeding Congresses (March 4, 1925 to March 3, 1933). Arentz was an unsuccessful candidate for reelection in 1932 to the Seventy-third Congress. He was a delegate to the Republican National Conventions in 1928 and 1932, and again engaged as a rancher near Simpson. He also resumed mining activities in Nevada and Utah.

Arentz died in Reno, Nevada, where he had gone to receive medical treatment, on June 17, 1934. He is interred in Mountain View Cemetery in Reno, Nevada.

U.S. House of Representatives
Preceded by Charles R. Evans	Member of the U.S. House of Representatives from Nevada's at-large congressional district 1921–1923	Succeeded by Charles L. Richards
Preceded by Charles L. Richards	Member of the U.S. House of Representatives from Nevada's at-large congressional district 1925–1933	Succeeded by James G. Scrugham
