= 1930 Nevada gubernatorial election =

- November 4, 1930
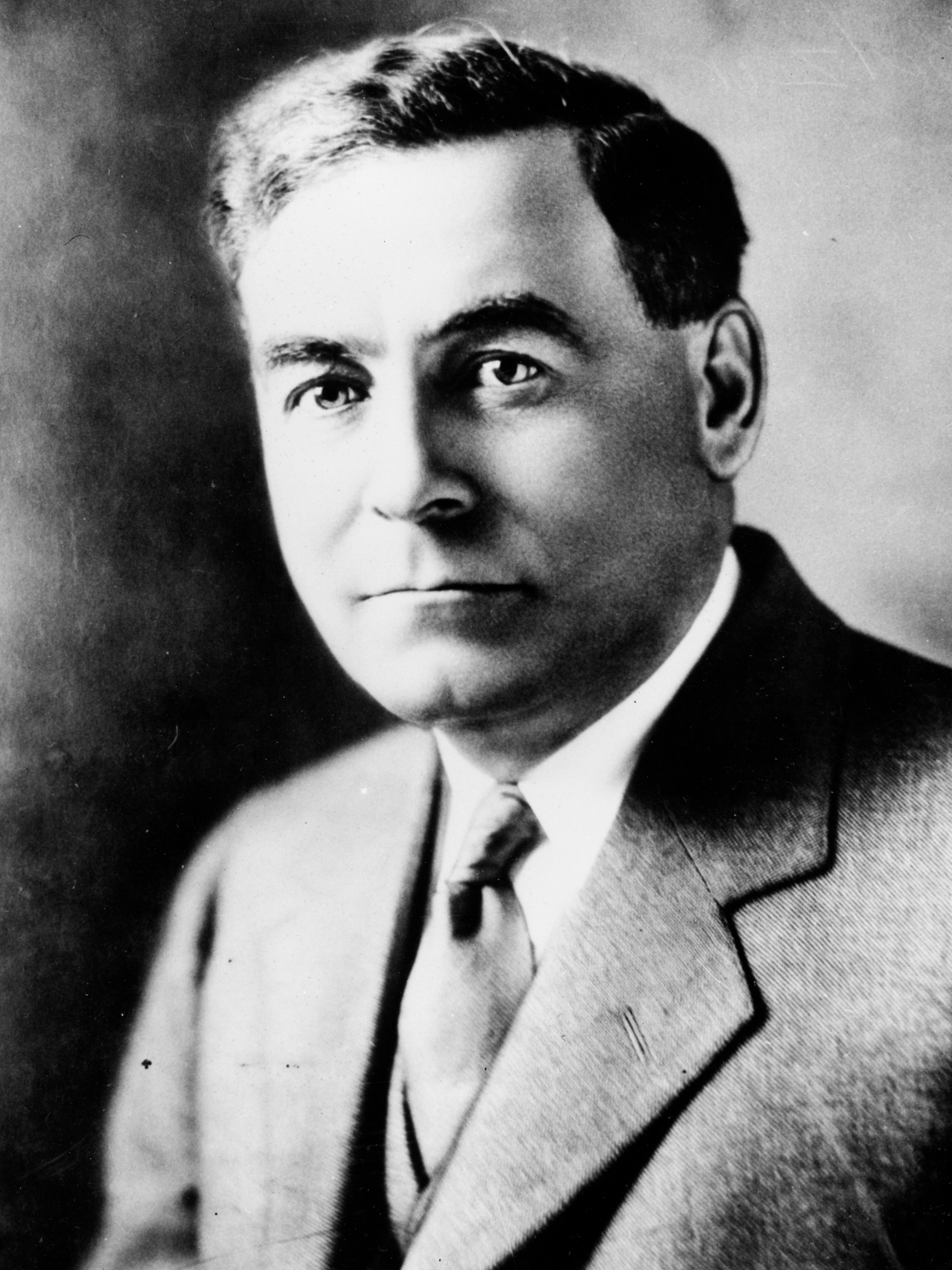

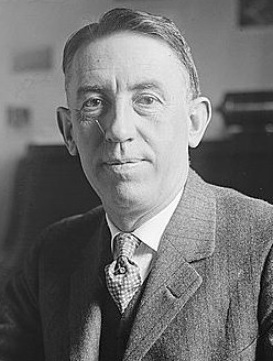
Nominee	Fred B. Balzar	Charles L. Richards
Party	Republican	Democratic
Popular vote	18,442	16,192
Percentage	53.25%	46.75%
- County results Balzar: 50–60% 60–70% 70–80% Richards: 50–60%
Governor before election
Fred B. Balzar
Republican
Elected Governor
Fred B. Balzar
Republican

The 1930 Nevada gubernatorial election was held on November 4, 1930. Incumbent Republican Fred B. Balzar defeated Democratic nominee Charles L. Richards with 53.25% of the vote.

== Primary elections ==
Primary elections were held on September 2, 1930.

=== Republican primary ===
==== Candidates ====
- Fred B. Balzar, incumbent Governor
- Edwin E. Roberts, Mayor of Reno
- R. H. Cowles

==== Results ====
Republican primary results
Party	Candidate	Votes	%
Republican	Fred B. Balzar (incumbent)	8,142	58.45
Republican	Edwin E. Roberts	3,907	28.05
Republican	R. H. Cowles	1,880	13.50
Total votes		13,929	100.00

=== Democratic primary ===
==== Candidates ====
- Charles L. Richards, former U.S. Representative
- Horace A. Agee

==== Results ====
Democratic primary results
Party	Candidate	Votes	%
Democratic	Charles L. Richards	4,856	52.27
Democratic	Horace A. Agee	4,435	47.73
Total votes		9,291	100.00

== General election ==
=== Candidates ===
- Fred B. Balzar, Republican
- Charles L. Richards, Democratic

=== Results ===
1930 Nevada gubernatorial election
Party	Candidate	Votes	%	±%
Republican	Fred B. Balzar (incumbent)	18,442	53.25%	+0.25%
Democratic	Charles L. Richards	16,192	46.75%	−0.25%
Majority		2,250	6.50%	
Total votes		34,634	100.00%	
Republican hold		Swing	+0.50%	

=== Results by county ===
County	Fred B. Balzar Republican		Charles L. Richards Democratic		Margin		Total votes cast
County	#	%	#	%	#	%	Total votes cast
Churchill	1,008	53.76%	867	46.24%	141	7.52%	1,875
Clark	1,545	46.61%	1,770	53.39%	-225	-6.79%	3,315
Douglas	543	72.89%	202	27.11%	341	45.77%	745
Elko	1,733	53.42%	1,511	46.58%	222	6.84%	3,244
Esmeralda	272	42.57%	367	57.43%	-95	-14.87%	639
Eureka	229	44.55%	285	55.45%	-56	-10.89%	514
Humboldt	599	49.75%	605	50.25%	-6	-0.50%	1,204
Lander	409	51.71%	382	48.29%	27	3.41%	791
Lincoln	620	41.78%	864	58.22%	-244	-16.44%	1,484
Lyon	892	59.71%	602	40.29%	290	19.41%	1,494
Mineral	621	61.49%	389	38.51%	232	22.97%	1,010
Nye	909	49.24%	937	50.76%	-28	-1.52%	1,846
Ormsby	747	69.68%	325	30.32%	422	39.37%	1,072
Pershing	548	47.82%	598	52.18%	-50	-4.36%	1,146
Storey	187	49.47%	191	50.53%	-4	-1.06%	378
Washoe	5,648	55.66%	4,500	44.34%	1,148	11.31%	10,148
White Pine	1,932	51.81%	1,797	48.19%	135	3.62%	3,729
Totals	18,442	53.25%	16,192	46.75%	2,250	6.50%	34,634

==== Counties that flipped from Democratic to Republican ====
- Elko
- White Pine

==== Counties that flipped from Republican to Democratic ====
- Esmeralda
- Eureka
- Humboldt
- Nye
- Pershing
- Storey
