= 1926 Nevada gubernatorial election =

- November 2, 1926
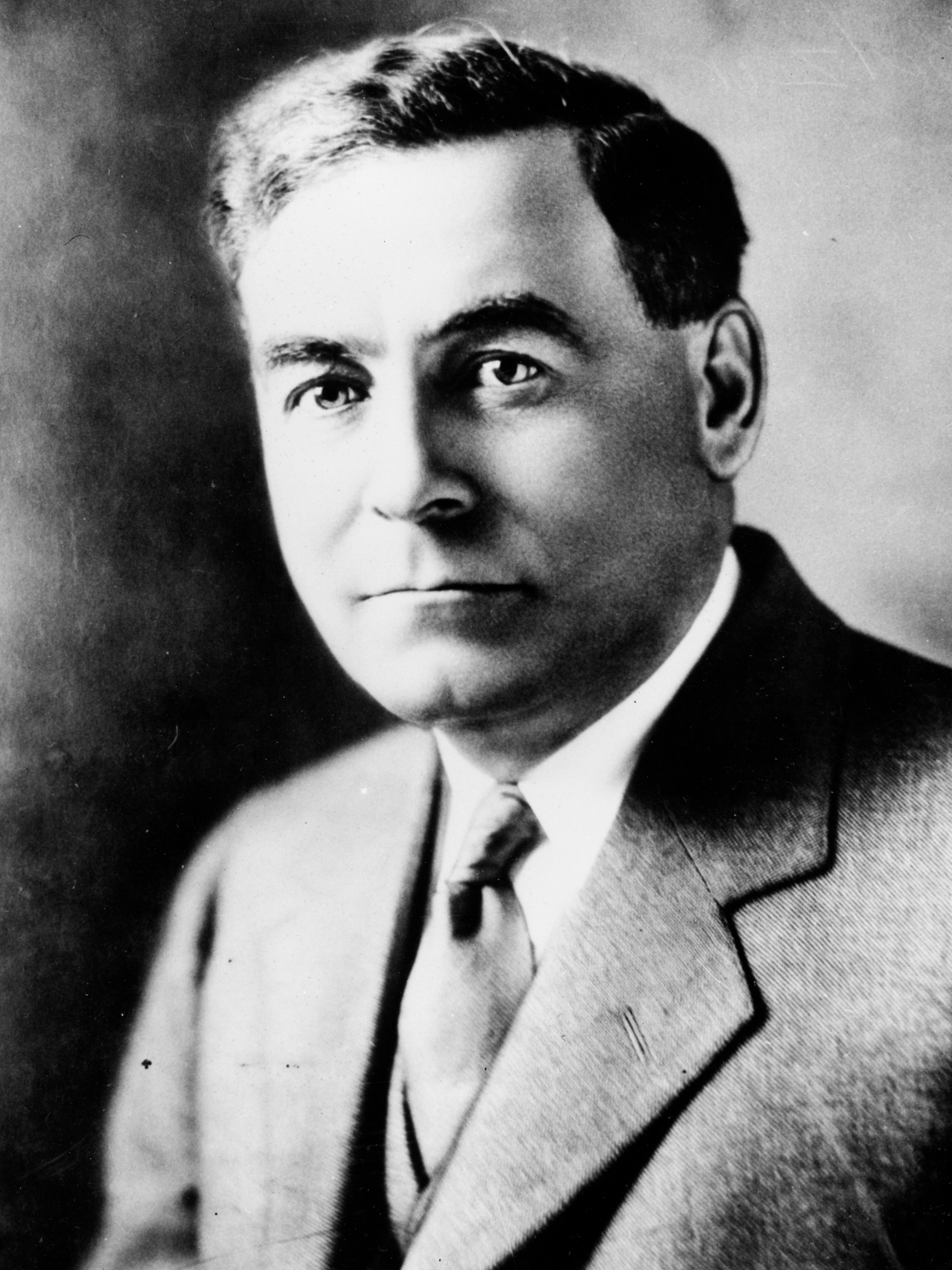

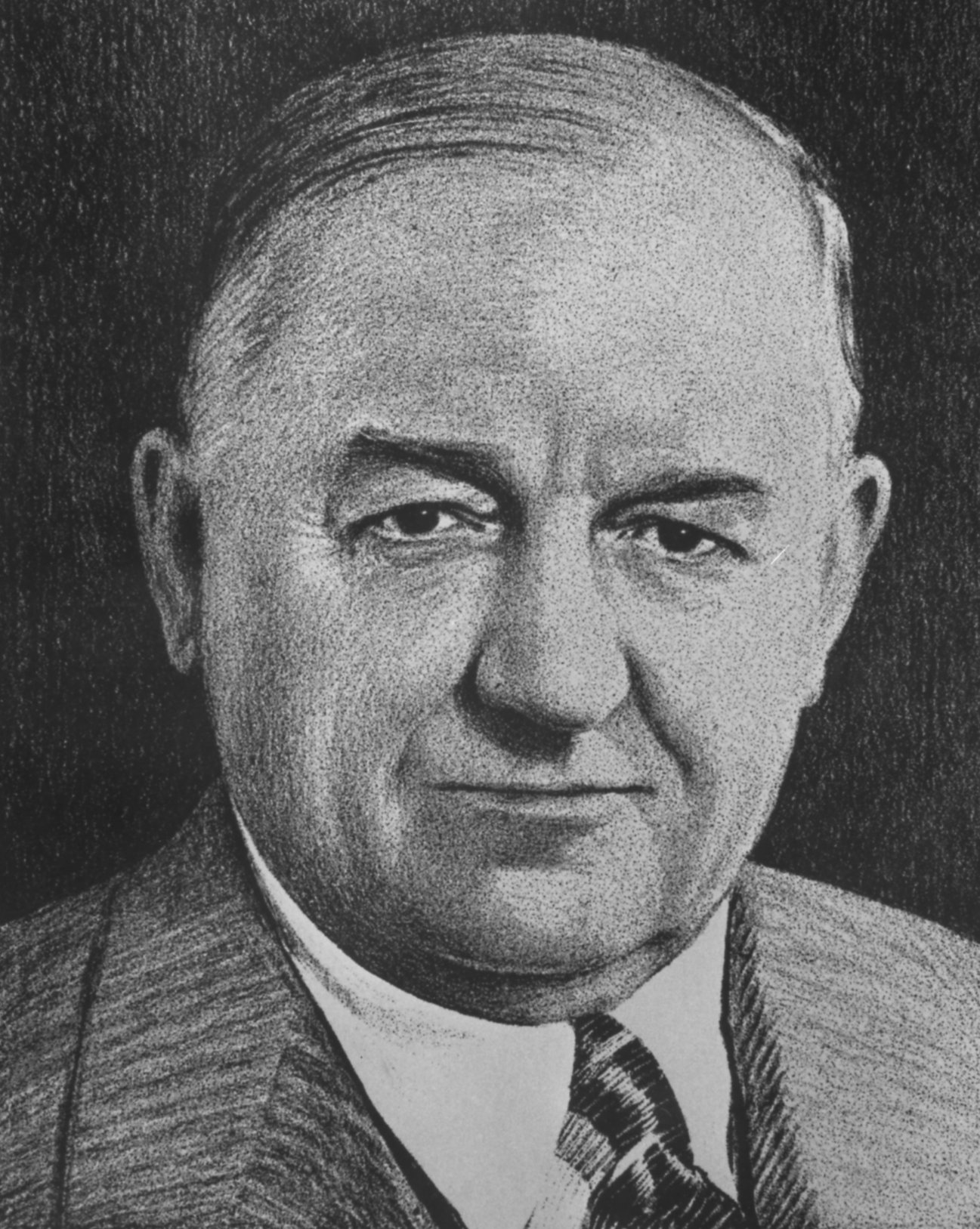
Nominee	Fred B. Balzar	James G. Scrugham
Party	Republican	Democratic
Popular vote	16,374	14,521
Percentage	53.00%	47.00%
- County results Balzar: 50–60% 60–70% 70–80% Scrugham: 50–60% 70–80% 80–90%
Governor before election
James G. Scrugham
Democratic
Elected Governor
Fred B. Balzar
Republican

The 1926 Nevada gubernatorial election was held on November 2, 1926. Republican nominee Fred B. Balzar defeated Democratic incumbent James G. Scrugham with 53.00% of the vote.

== General election ==
=== Candidates ===
- Fred B. Balzar, Republican
- James G. Scrugham, Democratic

=== Results ===
1926 Nevada gubernatorial election
Party	Candidate	Votes	%	±%
Republican	Fred B. Balzar	16,374	53.00%	+6.88%
Democratic	James G. Scrugham (incumbent)	14,521	47.00%	−6.88%
Majority		1,853	6.00%	
Total votes		30,895	100.00%	
Republican gain from Democratic		Swing	+13.75%	

=== Results by county ===
County	Fred B. Balzar Republican		James G. Scrugham Democratic		Margin		Total votes cast
County	#	%	#	%	#	%	Total votes cast
Churchill	1,199	63.24%	697	36.76%	502	26.48%	1,896
Clark	481	23.81%	1,539	76.19%	-1,058	-52.38%	2,020
Douglas	474	71.71%	187	28.29%	287	43.42%	661
Elko	1,545	49.52%	1,575	50.48%	-30	-0.96%	3,120
Esmeralda	366	54.06%	311	45.94%	55	8.12%	677
Eureka	480	75.00%	160	25.00%	320	50.00%	640
Humboldt	734	53.73%	632	46.27%	102	7.47%	1,366
Lander	515	68.03%	242	31.97%	273	36.06%	757
Lincoln	164	16.98%	802	83.02%	-638	-66.05%	966
Lyon	909	63.34%	526	36.66%	383	26.69%	1,435
Mineral	453	69.91%	195	30.09%	258	39.81%	648
Nye	1,274	52.38%	1,158	47.62%	116	4.77%	2,432
Ormsby	512	50.10%	510	49.90%	2	0.20%	1,022
Pershing	569	54.55%	474	45.45%	95	9.11%	1,043
Storey	432	53.20%	380	46.80%	52	6.40%	812
Washoe	4,939	58.53%	3,499	41.47%	1,440	17.07%	8,438
White Pine	1,328	44.83%	1,634	55.17%	-306	-10.33%	2,962
Totals	16,374	53.00%	14,521	47.00%	1,853	6.00%	30,895

==== Counties that flipped from Democratic to Republican ====
- Esmeralda
- Humboldt
- Lander
- Mineral
- Nye
- Ormsby
- Pershing
