= Henry C. Davis (Nevada politician) =

American politician from Nevada (1848–1889)

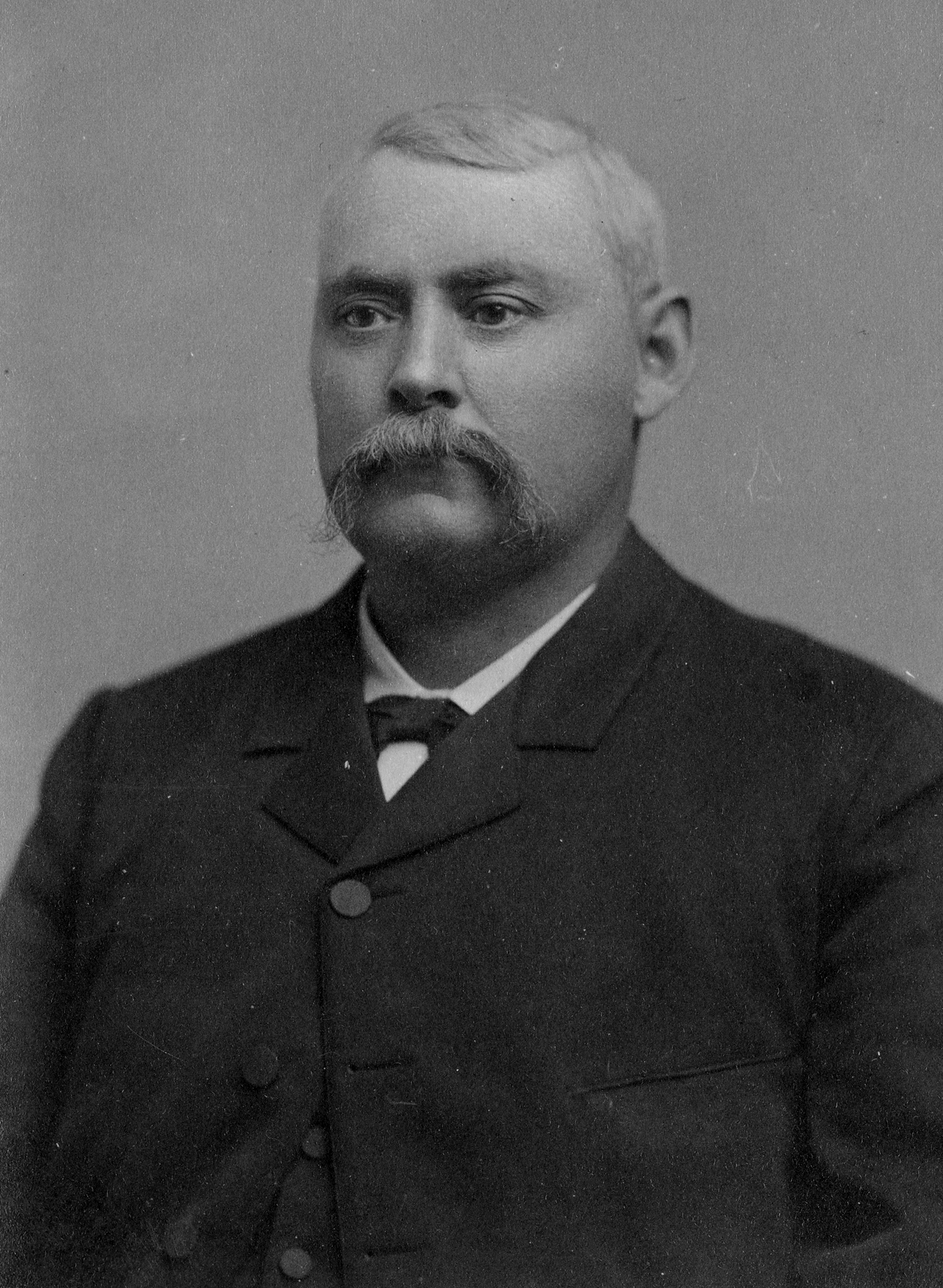

6th Lieutenant Governor of Nevada
- In office January 3, 1887 – August 22, 1889
- Governor: Charles C. Stevenson
- Preceded by: Charles E. Laughton
- Succeeded by: Samuel W. Chubbuck

Personal details
- Born: June 18, 1848 Vermilion County, Illinois, U.S.
- Died: August 22, 1889 (aged 41) Carson City, Nevada, U.S.
- Political party: Republican
- Children: 2

Henry C. Davis (June 18, 1848 – August 22, 1889) was an American politician who served as the sixth lieutenant governor of Nevada as a member of the Republican party from 1887 until his death in 1889. He was the first in the state's history to die in office.

== Early life ==
Davis was born on a farm in Vermilion County, Illinois on June 18, 1848. He worked as a farmer until he joined the railroad in 1864. Davis moved to Nevada in 1869, where he continued his railroad work.

On September 27, 1881, Davis married a Miss Hopkins, and they went on to have two children.

== Political career and death ==
Davis was first elected to the office of lieutenant governor of Nevada on November 3, 1886, with 55.90% of the vote, taking office on January 3, 1887. He became an elector for the 1888 United States presidential election, casting his vote for Republican candidate Benjamin Harrison.

Davis died suddenly on August 22, 1889, while mowing his lawn, becoming the first lieutenant governor of Nevada to die in office. His funeral took place on 2 pm on August 27, 1889, in Carson City, Nevada, where he was buried in Lone Mountain Cemetery.

He was succeeded as lieutenant governor by fellow Republican Samuel W. Chubbuck on September 9.

== See also ==
- List of lieutenant governors of Nevada

Political offices
| Preceded by Charles E. Laughton | Lieutenant Governor of Nevada; 1887-1889 | Succeeded by Samuel W. Chubbuck |
