= Frank Bell (Nevada politician) =

American politician (1840–1927)

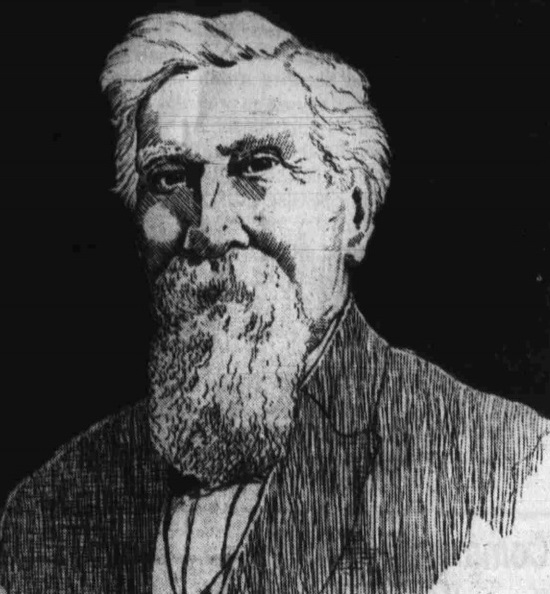

6th Governor of Nevada
- In office September 21, 1890 – January 5, 1891
- Lieutenant: Vacant
- Preceded by: Charles C. Stevenson
- Succeeded by: Roswell K. Colcord

8th Lieutenant Governor of Nevada
- In office 1889–1890
- Governor: Charles C. Stevenson
- Preceded by: Samuel W. Chubbuck
- Succeeded by: Joseph Poujade

Personal details
- Born: Francis Jardine Bell; January 28, 1840 Toronto, Upper Canada (modern Ontario, Canada)
- Died: February 13, 1927 (aged 87) Oakland, California, U.S.
- Resting place: Masonic Memorial Gardens; Reno, Nevada, U.S.
- Party: Republican
- Spouse: Mary Poore (m. 1872; died 1925)
- Children: 2

Francis Jardine Bell (January 28, 1840 – February 13, 1927) was a British North American-born American politician who was the sixth governor of Nevada. He was a member of the Republican Party.

He was born on January 28, 1840, in Toronto, in the province of Upper Canada (a British colony at the time; Confederation would not be achieved until another 27 years after his birth). He was educated in the common schools of his native country. He was a distant cousin to Alexander Graham Bell. He married Mary Poore on July 9, 1872, in Reno, Nevada and they had two children.

== Career ==
Bell came to Nevada in 1858, to supervise the construction of a transcontinental telegraph line though the state from Utah to California. He worked on this project until 1860. Later, Bell became a telegraph operator and was one of operators who telegraphed Nevada's Constitution to Washington D.C. in 1864.

Bell served as warden of the Nevada State Prison from 1883 to 1887. In 1889, he was appointed the eighth lieutenant governor by Charles C. Stevenson. He became acting governor when Governor Stevenson signed a disability certificate on September 1, 1890, making him Nevada's first foreign-born governor. During his tenure, he continued to carry out the policies of the Stevenson administration.

Bell did not seek a full term, serving until the inauguration of Roswell K. Colcord in 1891. He then returned to his work in the telephone and telegraph field. He continued to be politically active. He served as Warden of the Nevada State Prison from 1893 to 1895 and as justice of the peace from 1905 to 1909.

== Death ==
Bell died on February 13, 1927, in his daughter's home in Oakland, California, at the age of 87. He is interred at Masonic Memorial Gardens in Reno, Nevada.

== See also ==
- List of United States governors born outside the United States

Political offices
Preceded by Charles C. Stevenson	Governor of Nevada; 1890 – 1891	Succeeded by Roswell K. Colcord
Preceded by Samuel W. Chubbuck	Lieutenant Governor of Nevada; 1889 – 1890	Succeeded by Joseph Poujade
