= Maurice J. Sullivan =

American politician

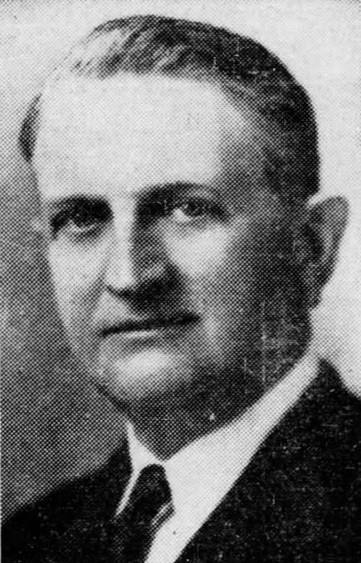
- Reno Gazette-Journal. November 4, 1942.

Member of the U.S. House of Representatives from Nevada's at-large district
- In office January 3, 1943 – January 3, 1945
- Preceded by: James G. Scrugham
- Succeeded by: Berkeley L. Bunker

15th and 18th Lieutenant Governor of Nevada
- In office January 2, 1939 – January 3, 1943
- Governor: Edward P. Carville
- Preceded by: Fred S. Alward
- Succeeded by: Vail M. Pittman
- In office January 4, 1915 – January 3, 1927
- Governor: Emmet D. Boyle; James G. Scrugham
- Preceded by: Gilbert C. Ross
- Succeeded by: Morley Griswold

Personal details
- Born: Maurice Joseph Sullivan; December 7, 1884 San Rafael, California, U.S.
- Died: August 9, 1953 (aged 68) Reno, Nevada, U.S.
- Resting place: Our Mothers of Sorrows Cemetery, Reno
- Party: Democratic
- Profession: Attorney

Maurice Joseph Sullivan (December 7, 1884 – August 9, 1953) was an American politician. He was the 15th and 18th lieutenant governor of Nevada and a U.S. Representative from Nevada. He was a member of the Democratic Party.

== Biography ==
Sullivan was born in San Rafael, California, on December 7, 1884. He attended the parochial schools of San Rafael, graduated from San Francisco Polytechnic High School, and attended San Francisco's Sacred Heart College. He learned the retail business with the San Francisco firm of Holbrook, Merrill & Stratton.

=== Business career ===
Sullivan moved to Goldfield, Nevada, in 1906, where he worked as a sales representative and manager for a company that provided hardware and other supplies for gold miners and mining companies. He eventually became the principal owner of the Wood-Sullivan Hardware Company and was an investor in several mining ventures. While living in Goldfield he served on the town board, as president of the local chamber of commerce, and as president of the local volunteer fire department.

=== Early political career ===
In 1914 he was elected Lieutenant Governor of Nevada and served from 1915 to 1927.

=== World War I ===
During World War I he was adjutant general of the Nevada National Guard, as well as Nevada's federal disbursing officer and director of the draft.

=== Legal career and return to politics ===
He studied law, was admitted to the bar in 1923 and commenced practice in Carson City.

In 1938 Sullivan was again elected Lieutenant Governor, and he served from 1939 to 1942.

=== Congress ===
In 1942 Sullivan was elected to the 78th Congress, and he served one term, January 3, 1943, to January 3, 1945. He was an unsuccessful candidate for renomination in 1944. After leaving Congress Sullivan resumed practicing law in Reno.

=== Death and burial ===
Sullivan died in Reno on August 9, 1953. He was buried in Reno's Our Mother of Sorrows (Mater Dolorosa) Cemetery.

Political offices
| Preceded by Gilbert C. Ross | Lieutenant Governor of Nevada; 1915–1927 | Succeeded by Morley Griswold |
| Preceded by Fred S. Alward | Lieutenant Governor of Nevada; 1939–1943 | Succeeded by Vail M. Pittman |
U.S. House of Representatives
| Preceded by James G. Scrugham | Member of the U.S. House of Representatives from Nevada's at-large congressional district 1943–1945 | Succeeded by Berkeley L. Bunker |
