= Morley Griswold =

American politician

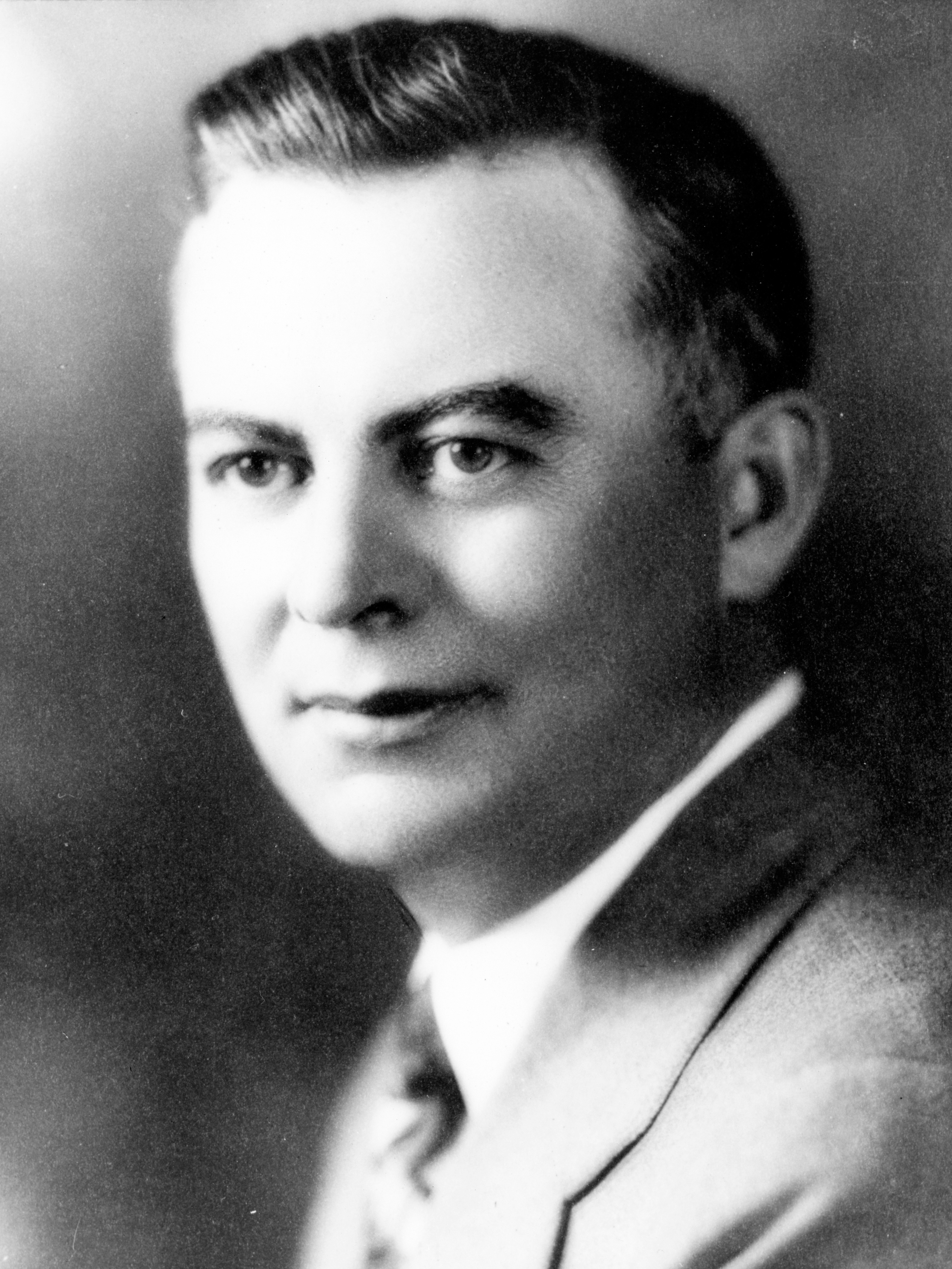
- Griswold in 1934

16th Governor of Nevada
- In office March 21, 1934 – January 7, 1935
- Lieutenant: Vacant
- Preceded by: Fred B. Balzar
- Succeeded by: Richard Kirman Sr.

16th Lieutenant Governor of Nevada
- In office January 3, 1927 – March 21, 1934
- Governor: Fred B. Balzar
- Preceded by: Maurice J. Sullivan
- Succeeded by: Fred S. Alward

Personal details
- Born: Morley Isaac Griswold; October 10, 1890 Elko, Nevada, U.S.
- Died: October 3, 1951 (aged 60) Reno, Nevada, U.S.
- Party: Republican
- Spouse: Frances Marianne Williamson
- Children: 1
- Education: University of Michigan

Morley Isaac Griswold (October 10, 1890 – October 3, 1951) was an American politician. He was the 16th governor of Nevada. He was a member of the Republican Party.

== Biography ==
Griswold was born near Lamoille, Nevada, on October 10, 1890. He graduated from the University of Michigan in 1913, and received his law degree from the University of Michigan Law School in 1915.

He practiced law in Reno. A Republican, he served as Reno City Attorney from 1915 to 1926. Griswold served in the U.S. Army during World War I.

He was the 16th lieutenant governor of Nevada from 1927 to 1934. He became the governor of Nevada upon the death of Governor Frederick Balzar on March 21, 1934. Unsuccessful in his election bid, he left office in January 1935.

Griswold died on October 3, 1951, in Reno, Nevada, at the age of 60.

Party political offices
Preceded by Fred B. Balzar	Republican nominee for Governor of Nevada; 1934	Succeeded by John A. Fulton
Political offices
Preceded by Fred B. Balzar	Governor of Nevada; 1934 – 1935	Succeeded by Richard Kirman Sr.
Preceded by Maurice J. Sullivan	Lieutenant Governor of Nevada; 1927 – 1934	Succeeded by Fred S. Alward
