= Charles L. Richards =

American politician

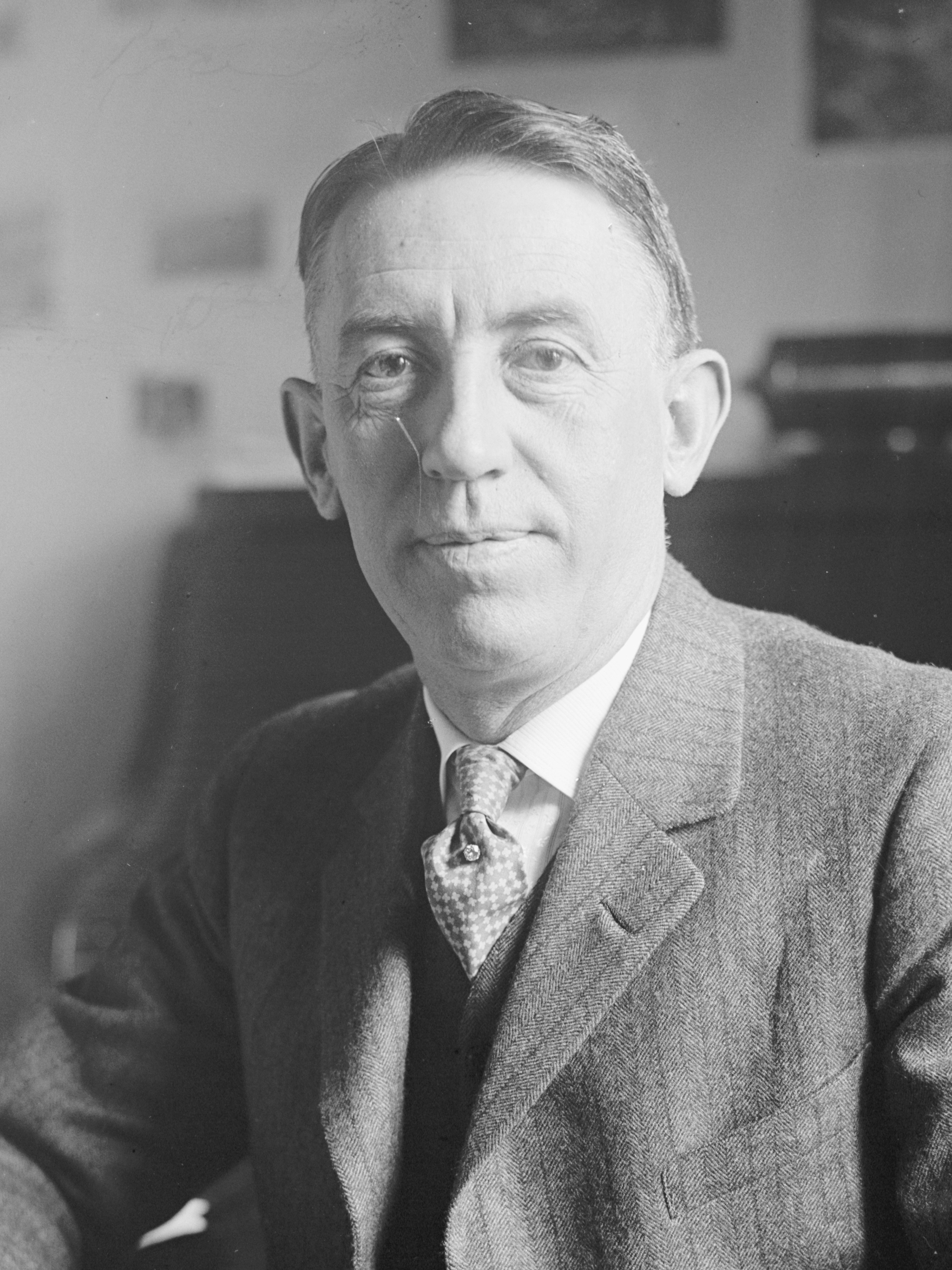
- Richards in 1923

Member of the U.S. House of Representatives from Nevada's at-large district
- In office March 4, 1923 – March 3, 1925
- Preceded by: Samuel S. Arentz
- Succeeded by: Samuel S. Arentz

Member of the Nevada State Assembly
- In office 1919

Personal details
- Born: October 3, 1877 Austin, Nevada, U.S.
- Died: December 22, 1953 (aged 76) Reno, Nevada, U.S.
- Resting place: Mountain View Cemetery
- Party: Democratic
- Profession: Attorney

Charles Lenmore Richards (October 3, 1877 – December 22, 1953) was an American lawyer and United States representative from Nevada, serving one term in Congress from 1923 to 1925.

== Early life and education ==
Born in Austin, Nevada, Richards attended public schools in Nevada and Pennsylvania. He graduated from the law department of Stanford University, in 1901.

== Early career ==
He was admitted to the bar and commenced practice in Tonopah, Nevada, in 1901. He was the district attorney of Nye County in 1903 and 1904.

== Political career ==
In 1919 he was a member of the Nevada Assembly and moved to Reno. He served as chairman of the Democratic State committee in 1922 and as councilor from Nevada to the United States Chamber of Commerce from March 29, 1923, to May 20, 1924.

=== Congress ===
Richards was elected as a Democrat to the Sixty-eighth Congress (March 4, 1923 – March 3, 1925). He ran for reelection in 1924 but did not win.

== Later career and death ==
He resumed law practice in Reno until his death there on December 22, 1953. He was buried in Mountain View Cemetery.

Party political offices
| Preceded by James G. Scrugham | Democratic nominee for Governor of Nevada; 1930 | Succeeded by Richard Kirman Sr. |
U.S. House of Representatives
| Preceded by Samuel S. Arentz | Member of the U.S. House of Representatives from Nevada's at-large congressional district 1923–1925 | Succeeded by Samuel S. Arentz |
