= Charles E. Laughton =

1st Lieutenant Governor of Washington

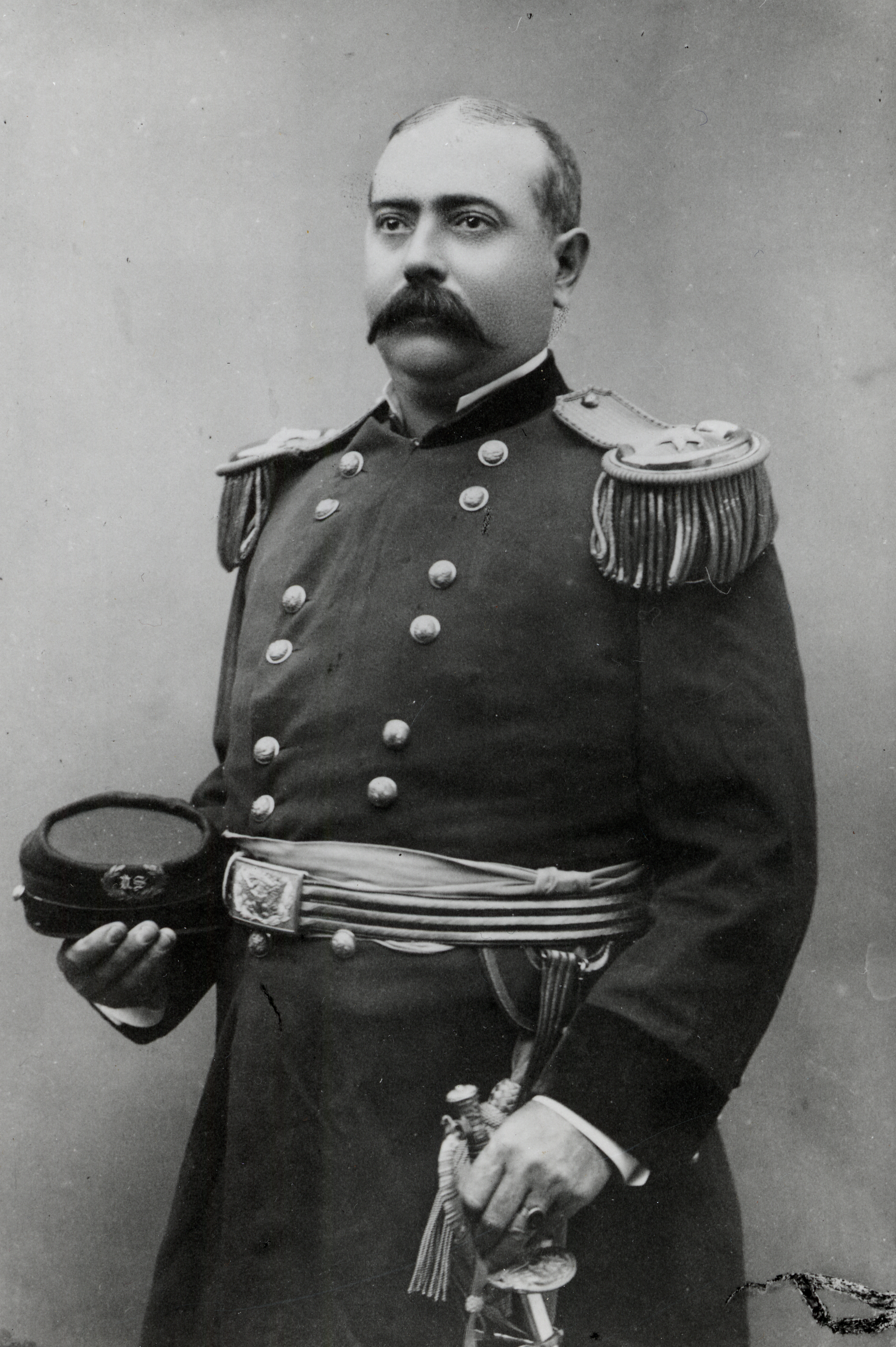

1st Lieutenant Governor of Washington
- In office November 11, 1889 – January 11, 1893
- Governor: Elisha P. Ferry
- Preceded by: Office established
- Succeeded by: F. H. Luce

5th Lieutenant Governor of Nevada
- In office January 1, 1883 – January 3, 1887
- Governor: Jewett W. Adams
- Preceded by: Jewett W. Adams
- Succeeded by: Henry C. Davis

Personal details
- Born: June 4, 1846 Penobscot County, Maine, U.S.
- Died: March 16, 1895 (aged 48) Tacoma, Washington, U.S.
- Party: Republican

Charles E. Laughton (June 4, 1846 – March 16, 1895) was an American politician and attorney from Washington and Nevada.

Laughton was born in Penobscot County, Maine. He was elected as a territorial representative for Stevens, Okanogan, and Spokane counties in 1888, before Washington Territory became a state. Laughton served as the first lieutenant governor of Washington and fifth lieutenant governor of Nevada. He was a member of the Republican Party.

Political offices
Preceded by Jewett W. Adams	Lieutenant Governor of Nevada; January 1, 1883 – January 3, 1887	Succeeded by Henry C. Davis
Preceded by office established	Lieutenant Governor of Washington; November 11, 1889 – January 9, 1893	Succeeded by F.H. Luce
