= Joseph Poujade =

American politician (1852–1930)

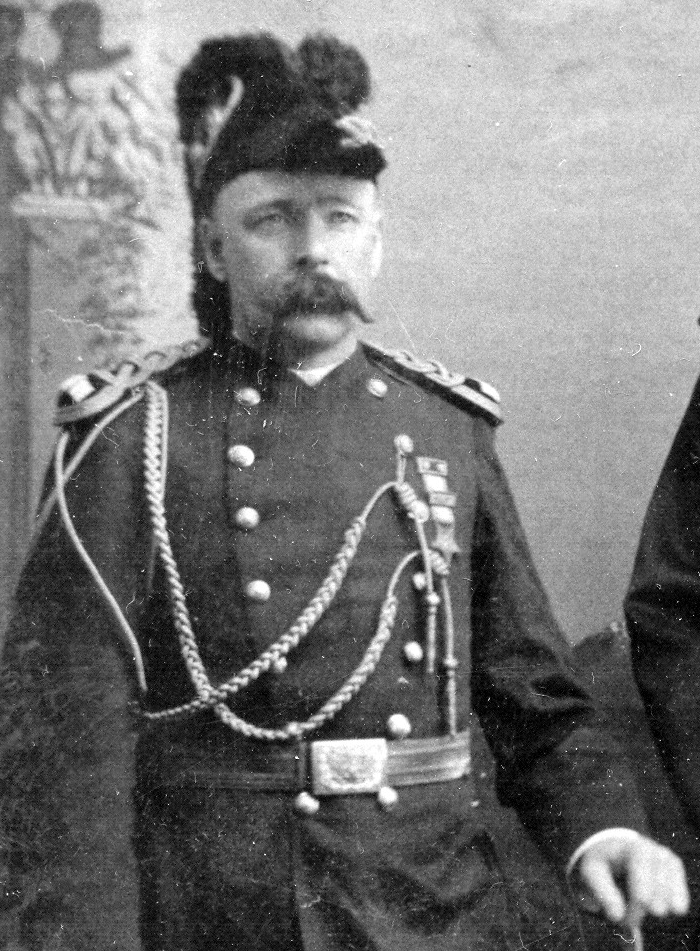

Joseph Hugh Poujade (October 6, 1852 – April 24, 1930) was an American lawyer and politician. He served as a state legislator and lieutenant governor in Nevada.

Theodore Poujade was his father and Marguerite Cosgrove his mother. He was born in Oregon Territory. He moved with his family to Nevada. He served as President pro tempore of the Nevada Senate.

He was elected mayor of Carson, Nevada. In 1891 and 1893 he was president of the Nevada Senate.
