= Lieutenant Governor of Nevada =

Public office in Nevada, USA

- Nevada State Seal

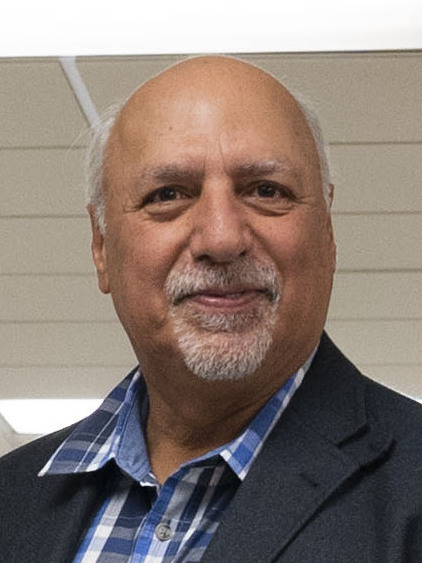
- Incumbent; Stavros Anthony since January 2, 2023
- Style: The Honorable
- Term length: Four years, two term limit
- Inaugural holder: John S. Crosman; 1864
- Formation: Constitution of Nevada
- Succession: First
- Website: Office of the Lieutenant Governor

The lieutenant governor of Nevada is a constitutional officer in the executive branch of government of the U.S. state of Nevada. The lieutenant governor maintains an office in Carson City, Nevada at the Nevada State Capitol and is elected separately from the Governor, and may therefore be from a different party than the Governor. The incumbent lieutenant governor is Stavros Anthony, a Republican. He was sworn in in January 2023. The governor has the authority to appoint a replacement to fill the balance of the term in any vacant constitutional office, including that of the lieutenant governor, subject to Senate confirmation.

== Powers and duties ==
Constitutionally, the lieutenant governor is first in the line of succession to the office of governor and is ex officio president of the Senate. In this capacity, the lieutenant governor serves as acting governor whenever the governor is out of state and succeeds to the executive office upon the permanent incapacitation of the governor. Moreover, as Senate president, the lieutenant governor presides over the Senate's daily proceedings whenever the Legislature is in session and may cast a tie-breaking vote. However, given the Senate is currently composed of an odd number of senators, ties are a rare occurrence.

In addition, the lieutenant governor has a number of statutory duties. For example, the lieutenant governor chairs the Commission on Tourism and the Advisory Board on Outdoor Recreation and serves as vice chair of the Board of Directors of the Department of Transportation. Likewise, the lieutenant governor is a member on the governor's Cabinet, the Board of Economic Development, the Executive Branch Audit Committee, and the Commission on Homeland Security.

== List of lieutenant governors of Nevada ==
#	Image	Name	Took office	Left office	Party
1		John S. Crosman	1864	1867	Republican
2		James S. Slingerland	1867	1871	Republican
3		Frank Denver	1871	1875	Democratic
4		Jewett W. Adams	1875	January 1, 1883	Democratic
5		Charles E. Laughton	January 1, 1883	January 3, 1887	Republican
6		Henry C. Davis	January 3, 1887	August 22, 1889	Republican
7		Samuel W. Chubbuck	September 1889	November 1889	Republican
8		Frank Bell	1889	1890	Republican
9		Joseph Poujade	1891	1895	Republican
10		Reinhold Sadler	1895	April 10, 1896	Silver
11		James R. Judge	1899	1903	Silver
12		Lemuel Allen	1903	1907	Silver-Democrat
13		Denver S. Dickerson	January 1907	May 22, 1908	Silver-Democrat
14		Gilbert C. Ross	1911	1915	Democratic
15		Maurice J. Sullivan	January 4, 1915	January 3, 1927	Democratic
16		Morley Griswold	January 3, 1927	March 21, 1934	Republican
17		Fred S. Alward	January 7, 1935	January 2, 1939	Democratic
18		Maurice J. Sullivan	January 2, 1939	January 3, 1943	Democratic
19		Vail Pittman	January 3, 1943	July 24, 1945	Democratic
20		Clifford A. Jones	January 1947	January 1, 1955	Democratic
21		Rex Bell	January 1, 1955	July 4, 1962	Republican
22		Maude Frazier	July 4, 1962	January 1, 1963	Democratic
23		Paul Laxalt	January 1, 1963	January 2, 1967	Republican
24		Edward Fike	January 2, 1967	January 4, 1971	Republican
25		Harry Reid	January 4, 1971	January 5, 1975	Democratic
26		Robert E. Rose	January 5, 1975	January 1, 1979	Democratic
27		Myron E. Leavitt	January 1, 1979	January 3, 1983	Democratic
28		Bob Cashell	January 3, 1983	January 5, 1987	Republican
29		Bob Miller	January 5, 1987	January 3, 1989	Democratic
30		Sue Wagner	January 7, 1991	January 2, 1995	Republican
31		Lonnie Hammargren	January 2, 1995	January 4, 1999	Republican
32		Lorraine Hunt	January 4, 1999	January 20, 2007	Republican
33		Brian Krolicki	January 20, 2007	January 5, 2015	Republican
34		Mark Hutchison	January 5, 2015	January 7, 2019	Republican
35		Kate Marshall	January 7, 2019	September 17, 2021	Democratic
36		Lisa Cano Burkhead	December 16, 2021	January 2, 2023	Democratic
37		Stavros Anthony	January 2, 2023	Incumbent	Republican
38		Sandra Jauregui		Elect	Democratic
