= Bob Miller (Nevada politician) =

American former attorney and politician

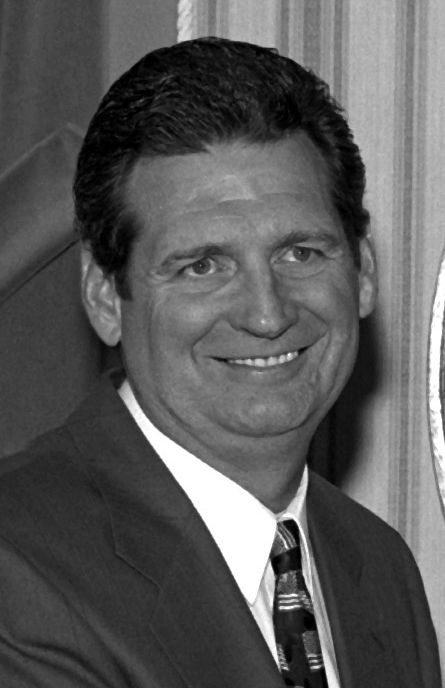

26th Governor of Nevada
- In office January 3, 1989 – January 4, 1999
- Lieutenant: Sue Wagner; Lonnie Hammargren
- Preceded by: Richard Bryan
- Succeeded by: Kenny Guinn

Chair of the National Governors Association
- In office July 16, 1996 – July 30, 1997
- Preceded by: Tommy Thompson
- Succeeded by: George Voinovich

29th Lieutenant Governor of Nevada
- In office January 5, 1987 – January 3, 1989
- Governor: Richard Bryan
- Preceded by: Bob Cashell
- Succeeded by: Sue Wagner

19th District Attorney of Clark County
- In office January 1, 1979 – December 31, 1986
- Preceded by: George Holt
- Succeeded by: Rex Bell

Personal details
- Born: Robert Joseph Miller; March 30, 1945 (age 81) Chicago, Illinois, U.S.
- Party: Democratic
- Spouse: Sandy Miller
- Children: 3, including Ross
- Education: Santa Clara University (BA); Loyola Marymount University (JD)

Military service
- Allegiance: United States
- Branch: United States Army
- Service years: 1967–1973
- Unit: United States Army Reserve; Air Force Reserve Command
- Conflict: Vietnam War

Robert Joseph Miller (born March 30, 1945) is an American former attorney and politician who served as the 26th governor of Nevada from 1989 to 1999. A member of the Democratic Party, he is Nevada's longest-serving governor. As of 2026, he is the last Democratic governor to be reelected, and is the most recent Nevada governor to have a lieutenant governor from the opposing party, having served with Republicans Sue Wagner and Lonnie Hammargren. Before ascending to the governorship, Miller was the 29th lieutenant governor of Nevada from 1987 to 1989.

== Early life and politics ==
Miller was born in Chicago, Illinois, and moved with his family to Las Vegas, Nevada as a child. His father, Ross Miller, was a bookmaker, who, according to his son's 2013 autobiography, Son of a Gambling Man, had operated on both sides of the law on some of the meaner streets of industrial Chicago.

Bob Miller attended Roman Catholic schools. He graduated from Bishop Gorman High School in 1963 with honors, and from Santa Clara University in 1967, earning a degree in political science. He received his J.D. degree from Loyola Law School in Los Angeles, California.

Miller served in the U.S. Army Reserve from 1967 to 1973, and later in the U.S. Air Force Reserve. He served as Clark County Deputy District Attorney from 1971 to 1973. In 1978, Miller was elected Clark County District Attorney, and in 1982 became the first holder of that office to win re-election. He was president of the National District Attorneys Association in 1984. Miller was elected the 29th Lieutenant Governor of Nevada in 1986 and was sworn in for a four-year term on January 5, 1987.

== Governor of Nevada (1989–1999) ==
On January 3, 1989, incumbent governor Richard Bryan resigned to take a seat in the U.S. Senate. Miller, as lieutenant governor, subsequently became governor under the Nevada succession law. After becoming governor, Miller addressed his staff, stating, "I'm looking forward for us to spend several years together. How many together depends on how well we do".

Miller ran in the 1990 Nevada gubernatorial election to keep his job. He easily won the Democratic nomination and defeated Republican Jim Gallaway in a landslide. He was reelected in the 1994 Nevada gubernatorial election, defeating Republican air force officer member (and future governor) Jim Gibbons. Miller chaired the National Governors Association from 1996 until 1997. His decade in office made him Nevada's longest-serving governor. Lifetime term limits prevented him from seeking re-election in the 1998 Nevada gubernatorial election. He was succeeded for governor by Republican Kenny Guinn.

After Miller's departure from office in January 1999, no Nevada Democrats were elected governor until Steve Sisolak in the 2018 Nevada gubernatorial election. Miller has a middle school in Henderson, Nevada named after him, which opened in 1999.

== After politics (1999–present) ==
Miller presently serves on the board of directors of Wynn Resorts and International Game Technology. He is the Principal of Robert J. Miller Consulting, which provides business-to-government and business-to-business advice and assistance. He is also a senior advisor with Dutko Worldwide, a bipartisan government relations company headquartered in Washington, D.C.

== Family ==
Miller and his wife, Sandy, have three children, including Ross Miller, who served as Secretary of State of Nevada from 2007 to 2015. He and his wife currently live in Henderson, Nevada.

Legal offices
| Preceded by George Holt | District Attorney of Clark County; 1979–1987 | Succeeded by Rex Bell |
Political offices
| Preceded by Bob Cashell | Lieutenant Governor of Nevada; 1987–1989 | Succeeded by Sue Wagner |
| Preceded by Richard Bryan | Governor of Nevada; 1989–1999 | Succeeded by Kenny Guinn |
| Preceded by Tommy Thompson | Chair of the National Governors Association; 1996–1997 | Succeeded by George Voinovich |
Party political offices
| Preceded by Richard Bryan | Democratic nominee for Governor of Nevada; 1990, 1994 | Succeeded by Jan Laverty Jones |
U.S. order of precedence (ceremonial)
| Preceded by Robert List as Former Governor | Order of precedence of the United States | Succeeded by Jim Gibbons as Former Governor |
