= 1991 Las Vegas mayoral election =

- May 7, 1991
Candidate	Jan Laverty Jones	Steve Miller	Monterey Brookman
Popular vote	21,761	11,379	6,084
Percentage	52.06%	27.22%	14.55%
Mayor before election
Ron Lurie
Democratic
Elected Mayor
Jan Laverty Jones
Democratic

The 1991 Las Vegas mayoral election took place on May 7, 1991 to elect the mayor of Las Vegas, Nevada. The election was held concurrently with various other local elections, and was officially nonpartisan. It saw the election of Jan Laverty Jones. With Jones winning a majority in the initial round of the election, no runoff was needed.

Jones' election as mayor made her the first woman ever to serve in any capacity on the Las Vegas City Council.

Jones was seen as having won, in part, due to strong support from female voters and strong support from trade unions.

== Results ==
Results
Party	Candidate	Votes	%
Nonpartisan	Jan Laverty Jones	21,761	52.06
Nonpartisan	Steve Miller	11,379	27.22
Nonpartisan	Monterey Brookman	6,084	14.55
Nonpartisan	John M. Bonaventura	888	2.12
Nonpartisan	Leonard V. Millman	443	1.06
Nonpartisan	Alfred Gomez	273	0.65
Nonpartisan	John 3:16 Cook	229	0.55
Nonpartisan	Joseph Michael Kadans	174	0.42
Nonpartisan	Charles E. "Doc" Broadus	132	0.32
Nonpartisan	Thomas M. Dudas	127	0.30
Nonpartisan	Ray Foster	105	0.25
Nonpartisan	William P. Steffel	121	0.29
Nonpartisan	Robert W. House	85	0.20
Total votes		41,801	
