= Kenny Guinn =

American politician (1936–2010)

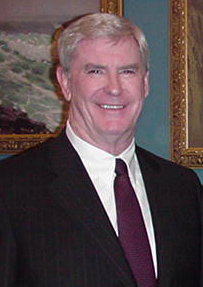

27th Governor of Nevada
- In office January 4, 1999 – January 1, 2007
- Lieutenant: Lorraine Hunt
- Preceded by: Bob Miller
- Succeeded by: Jim Gibbons

Acting President of the University of Nevada, Las Vegas
- In office 1994–1995
- Preceded by: Robert Maxson
- Succeeded by: Carol Harter

Personal details
- Born: Kenneth Carroll Guinn; August 24, 1936 Garland, Arkansas, U.S.
- Died: July 22, 2010 (aged 73) Las Vegas, Nevada, U.S.
- Cause of death: Falling and possibly following a heart attack
- Resting place: Exeter District Cemetery; Exeter, California, U.S.
- Party: Republican
- Other political affiliations: Democratic
- Spouse: Dema Guinn (m. 1956)
- Education: California State University, Fresno (BA, MA); Utah State University (EdD)
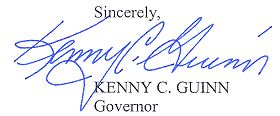
- Signature

Kenneth Carroll Guinn (August 24, 1936 – July 22, 2010) was an American businessman, academic administrator, and politician who served as the 27th governor of Nevada from 1999 to 2007. He previously served as interim president of the University of Nevada, Las Vegas (UNLV) from 1994 until 1995. Originally a Democrat, he joined the Republican Party before running for governor.

== Early life and career ==
Guinn was born in Garland, Arkansas and reared in Exeter, California. He married his wife, Dema, in Reno on July 7, 1956. They had two sons, Jeff and Steve. He earned undergraduate and graduate degrees in physical education from California State University, Fresno. He received his Bachelor of Arts in 1957. In 1970, Guinn earned an Ed.D. from Utah State University in Logan.

== Governor of Nevada ==
Guinn was first elected governor in 1998, defeating Democratic nominee Las Vegas Mayor Jan Laverty Jones, with 52% of the vote; Guinn became the first Republican elected governor of Nevada since 1978. When Guinn ran for re-election in 2002, he received 68% of the vote, defeating Democratic nominee state Senator Joe Neal, who received only 22%. In November 2005, Time magazine named him one of the five best governors in the U.S.

As Governor of Nevada, Guinn developed a reputation as a moderate Republican who was not motivated by partisan ideology. During his first term as governor, Guinn used the national tobacco settlement money, and pushed for the creation of the Millennium Scholarship program to provide all Nevada High School graduates with a 3.25 GPA, a scholarship to attend a Nevada university. He also championed a state run prescription drug benefit program for Nevada senior citizens called Senior RX. Guinn, who prided himself on his detailed knowledge of the state budget, believed Nevada's tax structure was inherently flawed with its dependence on growth and tourism—Nevada has no income tax and relies heavily on gaming and sales tax.

Guinn proposed a tax restructuring during the 2003 legislative session that was met with opposition from anti-tax business groups and many anti-tax Republicans. After a divisive session that divided the Republicans and ended in a Nevada Supreme Court decision upholding the passage of the bill very little of Guinn's original proposal was enacted. As Guinn had predicted the state was plunged into a serious budget deficit as soon as the 2008 recession hit the gaming and construction industry causing sales and gaming tax revenues to plummet. In percentage terms, Guinn's 2003 tax hike was the largest tax increase ever by one of the 50 states, but it was praised as "a controversial but realistic step to shore up the overstretched budget of the nation's fastest-growing state."

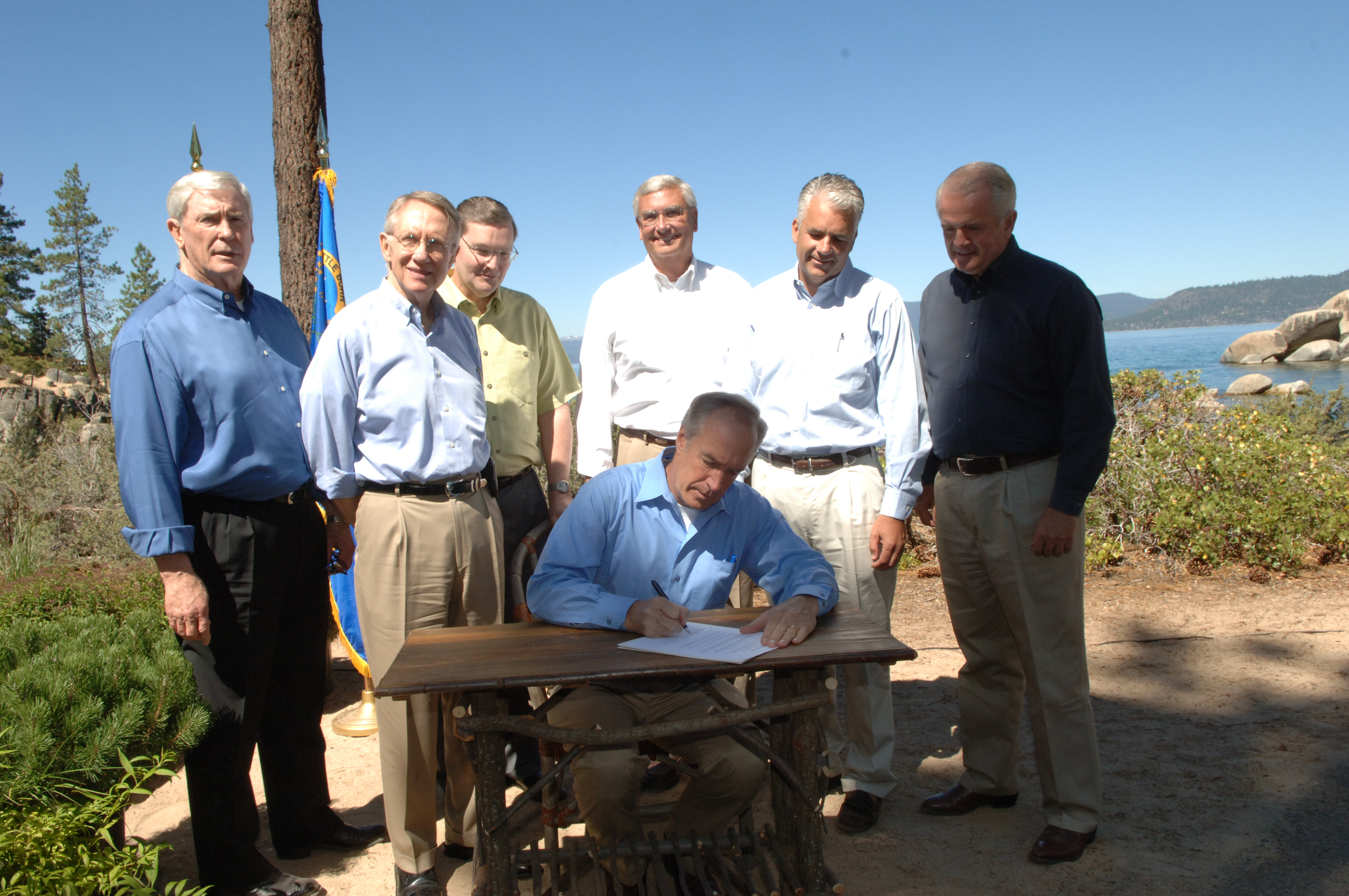
Guinn (far left) standing behind Interior Secretary Dirk Kempthorne, August 2006

In 2006, Guinn declined to endorse Jim Gibbons, the Republican nominee for Governor of Nevada, due to bitter disagreements between the two politicians. Gibbons was one of the more vocal critics of Guinn's tax plan during the 2003 legislative session. Guinn said only that he hoped a Republican would succeed him as governor. Gibbons defeated the Democratic nominee, Dina Titus. Guinn's second term as governor ended on January 1, 2007, due to lifetime term limits established by the Nevada Constitution. His official portrait was painted by artist Michele Rushworth and hangs in the state capitol in Carson City, Nevada.

Guinn served as a board member of MGM Resorts International (formerly MGM Mirage) from May 22, 2007, until his untimely death on July 22, 2010, under chairman and CEO Terrence Lanni (1995–2008) and James Murren (2008–2020).

== Death ==
Guinn died on July 22, 2010, at the age of 73, of complications from injuries sustained after falling from the roof of his Las Vegas home and possibly following a heart attack. He was pronounced dead at the University Medical Center of Southern Nevada in Las Vegas.

Guinn is interred at the Exeter District Cemetery in Exeter, California.

Academic offices
Preceded by Robert Maxson	Acting President of the University of Nevada, Las Vegas; 1994 – 1995	Succeeded by Carol Harter
Party political offices
Preceded by Jim Gibbons	Republican nominee for Governor of Nevada; 1998, 2002	Succeeded by Jim Gibbons
Preceded by Bob Taft	Chair of the Republican Governors Association; 2004–2005	Succeeded by Mitt Romney
Political offices
Preceded by Bob Miller	Governor of Nevada; 1999–2007	Succeeded by Jim Gibbons
