= 1998 Nevada gubernatorial election =

- November 3, 1998
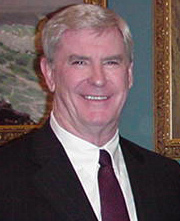

Nominee	Kenny Guinn	Jan Laverty Jones
Party	Republican	Democratic
Popular vote	223,892	182,281
Percentage	51.63%	42.04%
- County results Guinn: 40–50% 50–60% 60–70% 70–80% Jones: 40–50%
Governor before election
Bob Miller
Democratic
Elected Governor
Kenny Guinn
Republican

The 1998 Nevada gubernatorial election was held on November 3, 1998 to elect the governor of Nevada. Democratic incumbent Bob Miller was term limited and constitutionally ineligible to seek a fourth consecutive term in office. Republican businessman Kenny Guinn defeated Las Vegas mayor Jan Laverty Jones.

This was the first open Nevada gubernatorial election since 1978 and also the first time since 1978 that a Republican was elected governor of Nevada. As of 2026, this is also the most recent gubernatorial election in which the Democratic nominee carried any county other than Clark and Washoe.

== Democratic primary ==
=== Candidates ===
- Caeser D. Adamson
- Jim Champagne
- Patrick Matthew "Pat" Fitzpatrick, perennial candidate
- John Geremia
- Jan Laverty Jones, mayor of Las Vegas
- Joe Neal, state senator from North Las Vegas
- Carlo Poliak, perennial candidate
- Barbara Scott, public accountant
- Burvle "Ed" Swindle

=== Results ===
Democratic primary results
Party	Candidate	Votes	%
Democratic	Jan Laverty Jones	62,495	59.62%
Democratic	Joe Neal	16,646	15.88%
	None of These Candidates	12,857	12.27%
Democratic	Patrick Matthew "Pat" Fitzpatrick	3,468	3.31%
Democratic	Barbara Scott	3,213	3.07%
Democratic	Jim Champagne	1,964	1.87%
Democratic	Burvle "Ed" Swindle	1,591	1.52%
Democratic	Caeser D. Adamson	1,178	1.12%
Democratic	John Geremia	781	0.75%
Democratic	Carlo Poliak	630	0.60%
Total votes		104,823	100.00%

== Republican primary ==
=== Candidates ===
- Kenny Guinn, businessman
- Lonnie Hammargren, lieutenant governor of Nevada
- Aaron Russo, businessman and film producer
- Bruce Westcott, businessman

=== Results ===
Republican Primary results
Party	Candidate	Votes	%
Republican	Kenny Guinn	76,953	58.14%
Republican	Aaron Russo	34,251	25.88%
Republican	Lonnie Hammargren	13,410	10.13%
	None of These Candidates	5,783	4.37%
Republican	Bruce Westcott	1,956	1.48%
Total votes		132,353	100.00%

== General election ==
=== Candidates ===
- Kenny Guinn, businessman (Republican)
- Chuck Horne (Independent American)
- Jan Laverty Jones, mayor of Las Vegas (Democratic)
- Terry C. Savage (Libertarian)

=== Polling ===
Poll source	Date(s) administered	Sample size (Note: Key: A – all adults RV – registered voters LV – likely voters V – unclear)	Margin of error	Jan Laverty Jones (D)	Kenny Guinn (R)	Undecided
Mason-Dixon Polling & Strategy	October 25–27, 1998	817 (LV)	± 3.5%	44%	47%	9%
Mason-Dixon Polling & Strategy	September 25–28, 1998	814 (LV)	± 3.5%	36%	51%	13%
Mason-Dixon Polling & Strategy	August 24–26, 1998	838 (LV)	± 3.5%	39%	44%	17%
Mason-Dixon Polling & Strategy	July 29 – August 4, 1998	837 (LV)	± 3.5%	37%	42%	21%
Mason-Dixon Polling & Strategy	June 8–10, 1998	808 (LV)	± 3.5%	34%	48%	18%

=== Results ===
Nevada gubernatorial election, 1998
Party	Candidate	Votes	%	±%
Republican	Kenny Guinn	223,892	51.63%	+10.31%
Democratic	Jan Laverty Jones	182,281	42.04%	−10.65%
	None of These Candidates	12,641	2.92%	+0.60%
Independent American	Chuck Horne	7,509	1.73%	−0.91%
Libertarian	Terry C. Savage	7,307	1.69%	+0.64%
Majority		41,611	9.60%	
Total votes		433,630	100.00%	
Republican gain from Democratic		Swing	+20.86%	

==== Results by county ====
County	Kenny Guinn Republican		Jan Laverty Jones Democratic		None of These Candidates		Chuck Horne Independent American		Terry C. Savage Libertarian		Margin		Total votes cast
County	#	%	#	%	#	%	#	%	#	%	#	%	Total votes cast
Carson City	8,763	52.46%	6,976	41.76%	490	2.93%	248	1.48%	277	1.36%	1,787	10.70%	16,704
Churchill	4,593	63.52%	2,138	29.57%	218	3.01%	168	2.32%	114	1.58%	2,455	33.95%	7,231
Clark	125,926	49.82%	111,641	44.17%	6,698	2.65%	4,580	1.81%	3,900	1.54%	14,285	5.65%	252,745
Douglas	8,783	60.92%	4,727	32.79%	439	3.04%	240	1.66%	229	1.59%	4,056	28.13%	14,418
Elko	7,352	72.95%	1,990	19.75%	278	2.76%	255	2.53%	203	2.01%	5,362	53.21%	10,078
Esmeralda	319	59.51%	138	25.75%	40	7.46%	24	4.48%	15	2.80%	181	33.77%	536
Eureka	461	68.50%	151	22.44%	26	3.86%	16	2.38%	19	2.82%	310	46.06%	673
Humboldt	2,627	62.10%	1,271	30.05%	175	4.14%	89	2.10%	68	1.61%	1,356	32.06%	4,230
Lander	1,331	64.58%	551	26.73%	98	4.75%	41	1.99%	40	1.94%	780	37.85%	2,061
Lincoln	1,204	61.68%	549	28.13%	65	3.33%	102	5.23%	32	1.64%	655	33.56%	1,952
Lyon	5,042	54.25%	3,576	38.48%	318	3.42%	171	1.84%	187	2.01%	1,466	15.77%	9,294
Mineral	951	43.95%	1,012	46.77%	120	5.55%	48	2.22%	33	1.52%	-61	-2.82%	2,164
Nye	4,844	51.05%	3,884	40.93%	270	2.85%	207	2.18%	284	2.99%	960	10.12%	9,489
Pershing	876	56.30%	562	36.12%	63	4.05%	29	1.86%	26	1.67%	314	20.18%	1,556
Storey	790	47.19%	704	42.05%	85	5.08%	45	2.69%	50	2.99%	86	5.14%	1,674
Washoe	47,962	50.22%	41,409	43.36%	3,153	3.30%	1,144	1.20%	1,842	1.93%	6,553	6.86%	95,510
White Pine	2,068	62.38%	1,002	30.23%	105	3.17%	102	3.08%	38	1.15%	1,066	32.16%	3,315
Totals	223,892	51.63%	182,281	42.04%	12,641	2.92%	7,509	1.73%	7,307	1.69%	41,611	9.60%	433,630

==== Counties that flipped from Democratic to Republican ====
- Clark
- Storey
- Washoe
