= William H. Briare =

American politician (1930–2006)

18th Mayor of Las Vegas
- In office 1975–1987
- Preceded by: Oran K. Gragson
- Succeeded by: Ron Lurie

Personal details
- Born: William Hubert Briare; July 13, 1930 Long Beach, California, U.S.
- Died: December 8, 2006 (aged 76) Las Vegas, Nevada, U.S.
- Resting place: Woodlawn Cemetery, Las Vegas, Nevada, U.S.
- Party: Democratic
- Profession: Politician
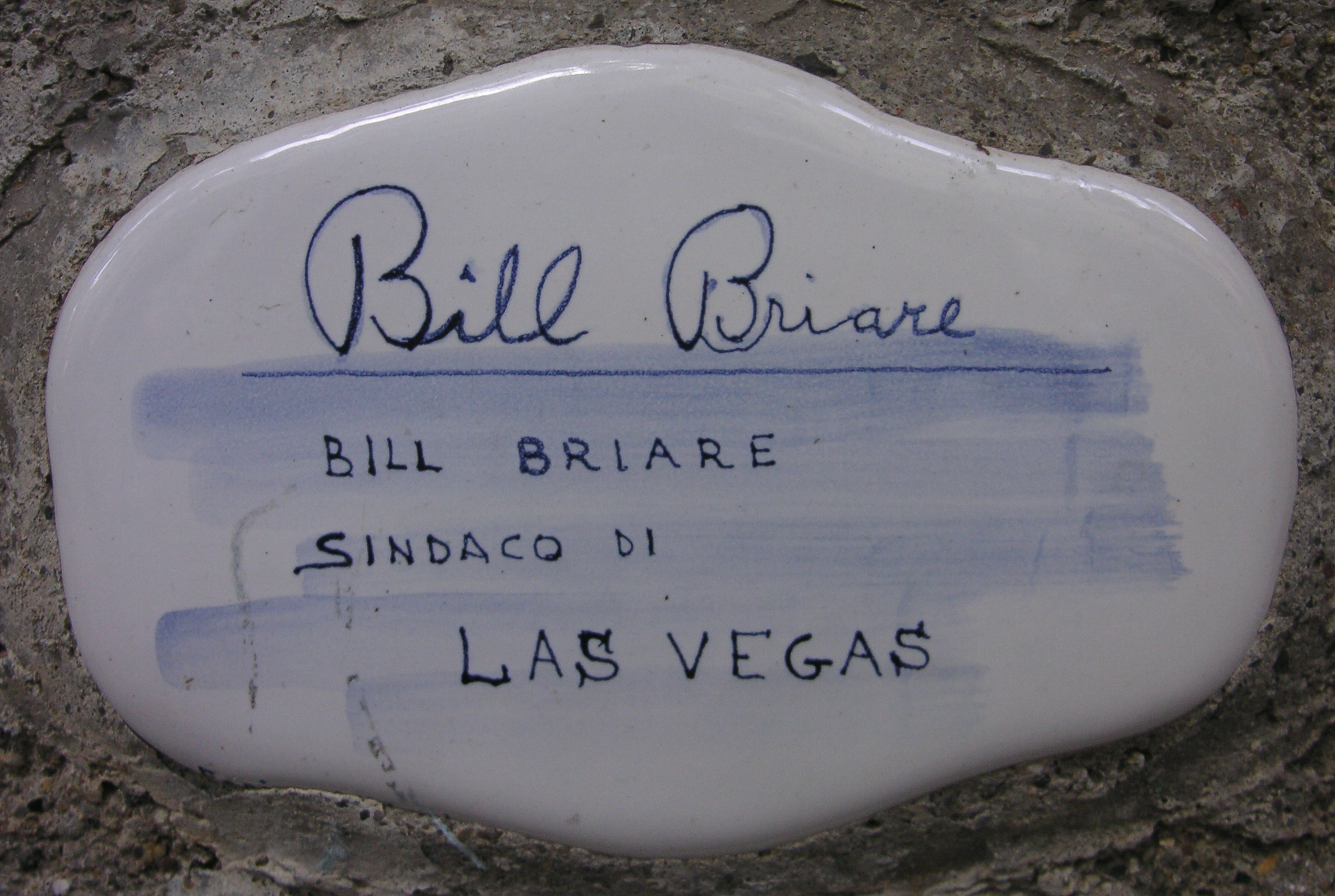
- Signature

William Hubert Briare (July 13, 1930 – December 8, 2006) was an American politician. He was the mayor of Las Vegas, Nevada from 1975 to 1987. Briare was a member of the Democratic Party.

== Personal life ==
Briare was born in Long Beach, California.

In the 1960s, Briare served in the Nevada Assembly and as a Clark County Commissioner. In 1971, he lost his first campaign for mayor of Las Vegas, Nevada to Oran K. Gragson, but Briare was elected in his next attempt in 1975, defeating Harry Reid. In 1976, a year after he began his term as the mayor, he visited in Israel in a mission of 16 mayors from US cities who visited the Knesset.

Briare was so positive about the city that people would ask him if he was the president of the Chamber of Commerce. His obituary in the Las Vegas Review Journal noted that Briare's "public tenure came during a key time when control of casinos shifted from organized crime figures to corporations."

In 1994, Briare ran for Lieutenant Governor of Nevada, but lost to Lonnie Hammargren.

Briare died in Las Vegas at the age of 76, and was interred at Woodlawn Cemetery.

Political offices
Preceded by Oran K. Gragson	Mayor of Las Vegas; 1975–1987	Succeeded by Ron Lurie
