= 2002 Nevada gubernatorial election =

- November 5, 2002
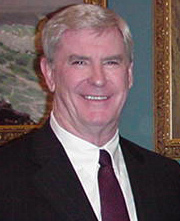

Nominee	Kenny Guinn	Joe Neal
Party	Republican	Democratic
Popular vote	344,001	110,935
Percentage	68.24%	22.01%
- County results Guinn: 60–70% 70–80% 80–90%
Governor before election
Kenny Guinn
Republican
Elected Governor
Kenny Guinn
Republican

The 2002 Nevada gubernatorial election took place on November 5, 2002. Incumbent Republican governor Kenny Guinn defeated Democratic nominee and Nevada State Senator Joe Neal in a landslide to win a second term.

This was the most recent Nevada gubernatorial election in which both major party candidates are now deceased, and was the first time since 1954 that an incumbent Republican Governor of Nevada was re-elected.

== Republican primary ==
=== Candidates ===
- Kenny Guinn, incumbent governor of Nevada
- Shirley Cook, retired court reporter
- Bruce Westcott, businessman
- Bill Hiett, rancher
- Stan Lusak, retired janitor and postal employee
- James K. Prevot
- Carlo Poliak, perennial candidate

=== Results ===
Republican Primary results
Party	Candidate	Votes	%
Republican	Kenny Guinn (inc.)	97,367	82.88%
Republican	Shirley Cook	7,717	6.57%
	None of These Candidates	7,195	6.12%
Republican	Bruce Westcott	2,507	2.13%
Republican	Bill Hiett	1,167	0.99%
Republican	Stan Lusak	566	0.48%
Republican	James K. Prevot	560	0.48%
Republican	Carlo Poliak	395	0.34%
Total votes		117,474	100.00%

== Democratic primary ==
=== Candidates ===
- Joe Neal, Nevada Senator and candidate in 1998
- Barbara Scott, public accountant
- Dan Meyer
- Christopher J. Petrella, veteran

=== Results ===
Democratic primary results
Party	Candidate	Votes	%
Democratic	Joe Neal	31,805	35.75%
	None of These Candidates	21,875	24.59%
Democratic	Barbara Scott	18,974	21.33%
Democratic	Dan Meyer	11,403	12.82%
Democratic	Christopher J. Petrella	4,917	5.53%
Total votes		88,974	100.00%

== General election ==
=== Predictions ===
Source	Ranking	As of
The Cook Political Report	Safe R	October 31, 2002
Sabato's Crystal Ball	Safe R	November 4, 2002

=== Polling ===
Poll source	Date(s) administered	Sample size (Note: Key: A – all adults RV – registered voters LV – likely voters V – unclear)	Margin of error	Kenny Guinn (R)	Joe Neal (D)	Other / Undecided
SurveyUSA	October 27–29, 2002	523 (LV)	± 4.4%	63%	28%	9%

=== Results ===
Nevada gubernatorial election, 2002
Party	Candidate	Votes	%	±%
Republican	Kenny Guinn (inc.)	344,001	68.24%	+16.61%
Democratic	Joe Neal	110,935	22.01%	−20.03%
	None of These Candidates	23,674	4.70%	+1.78%
Libertarian	Dick Geyer	8,104	1.61%	−0.08%
Independent American	David G. Holmgren	7,047	1.40%	−0.33%
Independent	Jerry L. Norton	5,543	1.10%	+1.10%
Green	Charles Laws	4,775	0.95%	+0.95%
Majority		233,066	46.24%	
Total votes		504,079	100.00%	
Republican hold		Swing	+36.64%	

=== County results ===
County	Kenny Guinn Republican		Joe Neal Democratic		None of These Candidates		Dick Geyer Libertarian		David G. Holmgren Independent American		Jerry L. Norton Independent		Charles Laws Green		Margin		Total votes cast
County	#	%	#	%	#	%	#	%	#	%	#	%	#	%	#	%	Total votes cast
Carson City	12,051	69.77%	3,448	19.96%	998	5.78%	268	1.55%	201	1.16%	142	0.82%	164	0.95%	8,603	49.81%	17,272
Churchill	5,867	79.54%	952	12.91%	186	2.52%	87	1.18%	190	2.58%	70	0.95%	24	0.33%	4,915	66.64%	7,376
Clark	200,157	65.20%	74,378	24.23%	17,240	5.62%	5,096	1.66%	3,741	1.22%	3,843	1.25%	2,548	0.83%	125,779	40.97%	307,003
Douglas	12,977	77.44%	2,520	15.04%	482	2.88%	243	1.45%	217	1.29%	136	0.81%	183	1.09%	10,457	62.40%	16,758
Elko	8,568	77.62%	1,386	12.56%	328	2.97%	269	2.44%	287	2.60%	127	1.15%	73	0.66%	7,182	65.07%	11,038
Esmeralda	286	65.15%	87	19.82%	23	5.24%	12	2.73%	24	5.47%	4	0.91%	3	0.68%	199	45.33%	439
Eureka	525	76.42%	85	12.37%	34	4.95%	12	1.75%	17	2.47%	9	1.31%	5	0.73%	440	64.05%	687
Humboldt	3,446	80.01%	522	12.12%	148	3.44%	57	1.32%	69	1.60%	45	1.04%	20	0.46%	2,924	67.89%	4,307
Lander	1,503	80.68%	231	12.40%	50	2.68%	24	1.29%	31	1.66%	18	0.97%	6	0.32%	1,272	68.28%	1,863
Lincoln	1,266	73.09%	279	16.11%	60	3.46%	33	1.91%	58	3.35%	26	1.50%	10	0.58%	987	56.99%	1,732
Lyon	8,169	75.00%	1,796	16.49%	360	3.31%	151	1.39%	200	1.84%	114	1.05%	102	0.94%	6,373	58.51%	10,892
Mineral	1,290	63.48%	508	25.00%	64	3.15%	23	1.13%	112	5.51%	19	0.94%	16	0.79%	782	38.48%	2,032
Nye	7,349	68.18%	2,226	20.65%	428	3.97%	225	2.09%	350	3.25%	134	1.24%	67	0.62%	5,123	47.53%	10,779
Pershing	1,254	75.18%	236	14.15%	69	4.14%	24	1.44%	51	3.06%	24	1.44%	10	0.60%	1,018	61.03%	1,668
Storey	1,198	72.69%	300	18.20%	56	3.40%	43	2.61%	17	1.03%	11	0.67%	23	1.40%	898	54.49%	1,648
Washoe	76,059	72.05%	21,244	20.13%	3,025	2.87%	1,504	1.42%	1,443	1.37%	783	0.74%	1,502	1.42%	54,815	51.93%	105,560
White Pine	2,036	67.31%	737	24.36%	123	4.07%	33	1.09%	39	1.29%	38	1.26%	19	0.63%	1,299	42.94%	3,025
Totals	344,001	68.24%	110,935	22.01%	23,674	4.70%	8,104	1.61%	7,047	1.40%	5,543	1.10%	4,775	0.98%	233,066	46.24%	504,079

==== Counties that flipped from Democratic to Republican ====
- Mineral (largest municipality: Hawthorne)
