= Fator =

Fator is a surname. Notable people with the surname include:

- Laverne Fator (1899–1936), American jockey
- Mark Fator (1904–1952), American jockey
- Terry Fator (born 1965), American ventriloquist, impressionist, stand-up comedian, and singer
