= COVID-19 pandemic in Nevada =

- Disease: COVID-19
- Pathogen: SARS-CoV-2
- Location: Nevada, U.S.
- Index case: Las Vegas, Nevada, U.S.
- Arrival date: March 5, 2020; 6 years ago
- Confirmed cases: 929,756 (through July 15, 2024)
- Deaths: 12,699 (through July 15, 2024)
- Vaccinations: 1,825,077

Government website
- dpbh.nv.gov/coronavirus/

The COVID-19 pandemic was confirmed to have reached the U.S. state of Nevada on March 5, 2020. Because of concerns about coronavirus disease 2019 (COVID-19), Nevada governor Steve Sisolak declared a state of emergency on March 12, 2020. Four days later, Nevada reported its first death. On March 17, 2020, Sisolak ordered the closure of non-essential businesses in the state, to help prevent the spread of the coronavirus. Grocery stores were among the businesses considered essential, and restaurants were allowed to provide drive-thru, takeout, and delivery services. At the end of March 2020, Sisolak announced a 90-day moratorium on evictions and foreclosures for commercial and residential tenants. The moratorium would be extended several times over the next year.

Various protests were held against Sisolak's shutdown order beginning in April 2020. Las Vegas mayor Carolyn Goodman was also critical of the shutdown and its length, urging Sisolak to reopen the state. Goodman was widely criticized after suggesting that Las Vegas become a control group to test the effectiveness of social distancing. Nevada launched the first phase of its reopening on May 9, 2020. Restaurants and retailers were among the businesses allowed to reopen, but with precautions in place, such as limiting occupancy to 50 percent. A second phase went into effect on May 29, 2020. It allowed for the reopening of state parks and businesses such as bars, gyms, and movie theaters. Casinos began reopening on June 4, 2020.

COVID-19 cases increased following the reopenings, and facial masks were mandated for residents at the end of June 2020. Bars in certain counties were closed the following month to help stop the rise in cases, and they gradually reopened over the next few months. In September 2020, Sisolak announced that live shows and conventions could resume with reduced attendance. Cases began to rise again in October 2020, following a decline in the months prior. COVID-19 vaccinations began at the end of 2020, and Sisolak reduced capacity for gatherings and various businesses to help stop the surge in cases. His latest measures were gradually eased starting in February 2021.

Control over COVID-19 restrictions was transferred from the state to individual counties on May 1, 2021, and the mask mandate was briefly eased that month for fully vaccinated residents. Cases and hospitalizations increased during mid-2021, due to vaccine hesitancy and the emergence of the SARS-CoV-2 Delta variant, which was more transmissible. The SARS-CoV-2 Omicron variant resulted in another surge beginning in December 2021. It subsided within a few months, and Sisolak ended the mask mandate in February 2022, amid a decrease in cases and hospitalizations.

The majority of cases and deaths have occurred in Clark County, which includes the Las Vegas Valley. Washoe County, which includes the Reno-Sparks area, is the second most-impacted county. As of November 1, 2023, there have been 904,681 cases and 12,176 deaths reported in Nevada, and the state has fully vaccinated 1,818,779 residents.

== Timeline ==
=== 2020 ===
On March 5, 2020, Nevada reported its first case of coronavirus disease 2019 (COVID-19): a Las Vegas resident in his 50s who had recently traveled to Washington, the first state infected by the virus. Nevada governor Steve Sisolak declared a state of emergency one week later, because of concerns about the COVID-19 pandemic. He also formed a medical advisory team. Nevada reported its first COVID-19 death on March 16, 2020. A day later, Sisolak ordered non-essential businesses in the state to close for 30 days, to prevent the spread of the virus. Casinos were among businesses ordered to shut down. Las Vegas mayor Carolyn Goodman opposed the length of his shutdown order, and would become a critic of his actions during the pandemic, urging him to reopen the state.

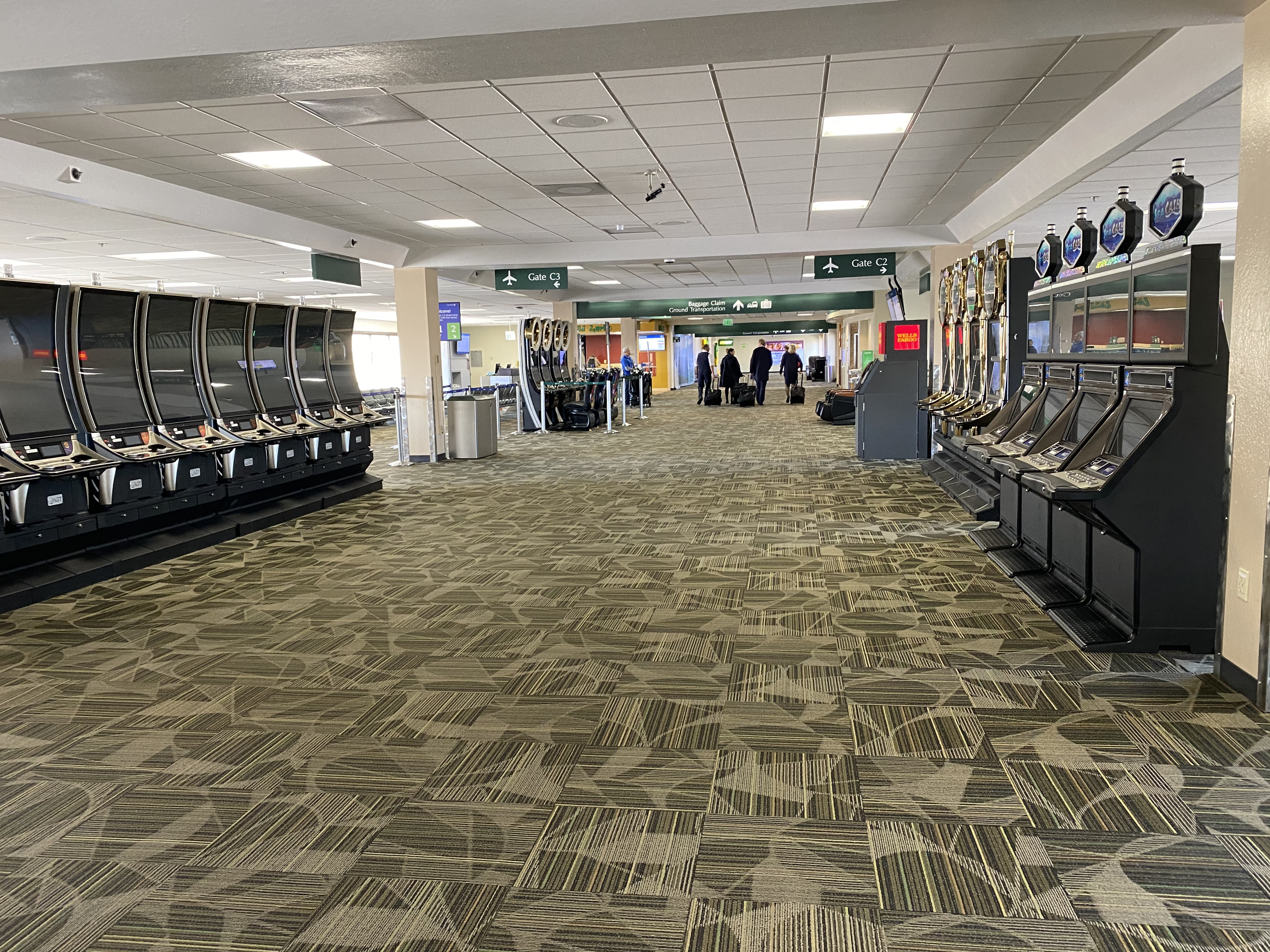
Reno–Tahoe International Airport, largely empty during the early days of the pandemic (March 20, 2020)

The business closures went into effect on March 18, 2020, and were later extended. Grocery stores, hardware stores, pharmacies, banks, and gas stations were among businesses considered essential. Police, fire, and healthcare services continued operations as well, along with construction sites. Sisolak also banned gatherings of 10 people or more, in an effort to further prevent the spread of coronavirus. On April 1, 2020, he extended the closure of non-essential businesses through the end of the month, in accordance with new federal guidelines issued by the White House Coronavirus Task Force. He also issued a statewide directive urging residents to stay home, except for essential reasons such as healthcare visits and buying food. The Federal Emergency Management Agency approved a major disaster declaration for Nevada.

In mid-April 2020, Mayor Goodman called Sisolak's shutdown "total insanity" and urged him to reopen the state. Over the next several weeks, conservatives and supporters of Donald Trump's presidency held protests in several cities, also urging Sisolak to reopen the state. However, Sisolak said various conditions had to be met first.

In an interview on April 23, 2020, Goodman again said the closure should be ended, and received wide criticism after suggesting that Las Vegas become a control group to test the effectiveness of social distancing. Shortly thereafter, former professional poker player Doug Polk launched a recall effort against Goodman, stating that she "failed to responsibly represent her constituency" and demonstrated a "clear disregard" for public health. The effort was ultimately unsuccessful, due to a rise in COVID-19 cases and the fact that in-person signatures are required.

At the end of April 2020, Nevada joined the Western States Pact, a group of neighboring states working together on how to proceed with reopening. Meanwhile, cases and deaths had leveled out in the state. Phase one of Nevada's reopening began on May 9, 2020. It included restaurants and retailers, which could operate with precautions in place, such as 50-percent occupancy. Phase two went into effect on May 29, 2020. It included the reopening of bars, bowling alleys, gyms, movie theaters, pools, spas, state parks, and tattoo shops. Sisolak also increased public gathering limits to 50 people.

Casinos were allowed to reopen on June 4, 2020. Increased COVID-19 testing and the reopening of businesses contributed to a rise in cases later that month. Sisolak postponed plans for a phase three of reopening, and he instituted a face mask mandate at the end of the month. In August 2020, Sisolak unveiled a new plan for dealing with outbreaks, such as determining their cause and shutting down facilities where they originate. He said the plan would move away from the system of phased openings: "While phases made sense at the time, we've got to remain flexible and responsive to what we're seeing now."

The number of hospitalizations and new daily cases dropped beginning in August 2020, but saw a resurgence two months later. The spike was attributed to residents who had grown tired of following COVID-19 precautions. In November 2020, Sisolak strongly urged residents to stay home as much as possible with a 14-day proposal called Stay at Home 2.0, saying severe business lockdowns would occur if cases did not decline. Non-residents were still welcome to visit the state because of its tourism dependency. A few days after the proposal was made, Sisolak tested positive for the virus.

Cases continued a dramatic rise, prompting a three-week "pause" from Sisolak just before Thanksgiving. He noted that 10 percent of the state's total COVID-19 cases had been reported in the past week. Under the new restrictions, certain businesses – including casinos, restaurants, bars, and gyms – would have their operating capacity reduced to 25 percent. Public gatherings would be reduced from 250 people to 50, or 25 percent of a building's capacity. Private gatherings were reduced back to 10 people. Sisolak also restricted Thanksgiving gatherings to 10 people, from a maximum of two households. Since the start of the pandemic, state hospitalizations had reached their highest level ever, with 97 percent occurring in Clark and Washoe County. At that time, the majority of cases were affecting people in their 20s and 30s. Goodman criticized Sisolak's latest orders, calling him a "dictator" and stating that his actions would further harm the Las Vegas economy.

Nevada continued to experience record-high hospitalizations during December 2020, more than doubling the number of hospitalized patients from a month prior. The state's positivity rate also reached record highs at more than 20 percent, among the highest in the U.S.; the ideal rate would be below 5 percent. COVID-19 vaccinations began in the state on December 14, 2020, and Sisolak announced a four-week extension of his recent pause as it neared its originally scheduled end. On December 19, 2020, the state surpassed 200,000 cases, doubling the number from seven weeks earlier. Hospitals continued their struggle to keep up with COVID-19 patients, and the state surpassed 3,000 deaths at the end of the month.

=== 2021 ===
Hospitalizations saw a decline during early January 2021, although the number of daily cases and deaths had reached record highs. Health officials were concerned that cases may rise further, as a result of recent Christmas and New Year's Eve gatherings. Sisolak extended his pause for another 30 days. The state reported its 4,000th death before the end of the month, although cases and hospitalizations began a decline.

Sisolak scaled back his November restrictions in mid-February 2021. Capacity limits increased to 35 percent for some businesses – including casinos, restaurants, and gyms – and 50 percent for others, such as libraries, museums, and zoos. Public gatherings increased to 100 people or 35 percent of a building's capacity, whichever is less. Private gatherings expanded to 25 people for outdoor events but remained at a 10-person limit for indoor gatherings. On March 15, 2021, statewide business capacity was increased to 50 percent. Las Vegas showed significant signs of returning to normalcy, as conditions continued to improve.

Control over pandemic restrictions was transferred from the state to local counties on May 1, 2021, with Clark County increasing business capacity to 80 percent. Shortly thereafter, the mask mandate was eased based on new CDC guidance, exempting them from being worn by the fully-vaccinated when in outdoor public spaces. Clark County ended all other COVID-19 restrictions on June 1, 2021. Statewide cases and hospitalizations began to rise later that month, due to vaccine hesitancy and the emergence of the SARS-CoV-2 Delta variant. By July 2021, Nevada's infection rate was among the worst in the U.S. Face masks were mandated again for indoor settings, in counties where the infection rate was high. Clark County saw a particularly high number of cases, due to its population density, low vaccination rates, and tourism industry.

The Delta variant caused an increase in the number of breakthrough infections, and Nevada sought federal assistance for testing and vaccination efforts. Goodman was among those who contracted the virus, despite being vaccinated. The rise in cases and hospitalizations continued into August 2021, with the Delta variant accounting for nearly all cases. Statewide, cases began a decline in September 2021, following increased vaccination efforts. While cases of the Delta variant declined in most of the state, they remained high in rural areas, putting a strain on hospitals. The state reported its first case of the SARS-CoV-2 Omicron variant in December 2021, leading to another surge in cases carrying into the following year.

=== 2022–present ===
The Las Vegas Valley saw record-high case numbers following the Christmas and New Year's holidays, although cases and hospitalizations soon decreased, prompting Sisolak to lift the mask mandate on February 10, 2022. Within two months, cases began increasing again, due to loosened pandemic restrictions and a new Omicron subvariant. Hospitalizations also increased, but not enough to pose a burden.

After more than two years, Sisolak declared an end to the state of emergency on May 20, 2022, with COVID-related programs being gradually phased out. Conservative groups had criticized the length of the declared emergency. Sisolak's tenure as governor was largely defined by the pandemic, which began a year into his term. Joe Lombardo, a candidate in the 2022 Nevada gubernatorial election, was critical of Sisolak's pandemic restrictions and felt he did not do enough to jumpstart the state's economy. Lombardo defeated Sisolak in the election and took office in January 2023. His first executive orders officially eliminated any remaining COVID-19 mandates made by Sisolak, and also required state office employees to resume in-person work within six months.

After more than three years, the U.S. lifted its COVID-19 public health emergency on May 11, 2023, although officials cautioned that the virus remained a potential threat. One of Nevada's last remaining COVID-19 safety protocols, a state bill which mandated the daily cleaning of hotel rooms, was repealed by Lombardo a week later.

== Epidemiology and medical response ==
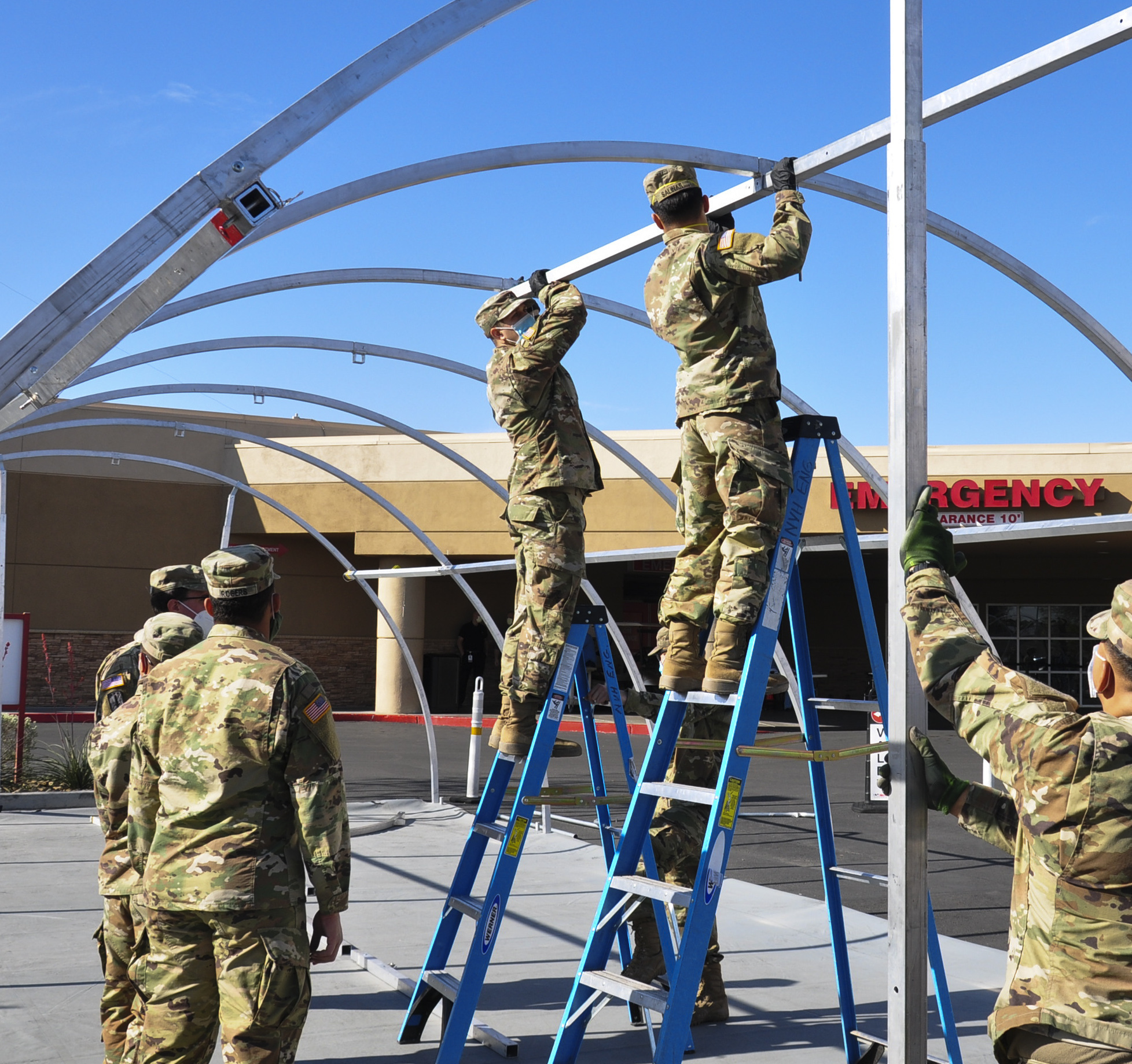
National Guard soldiers setting up emergency tents in Las Vegas

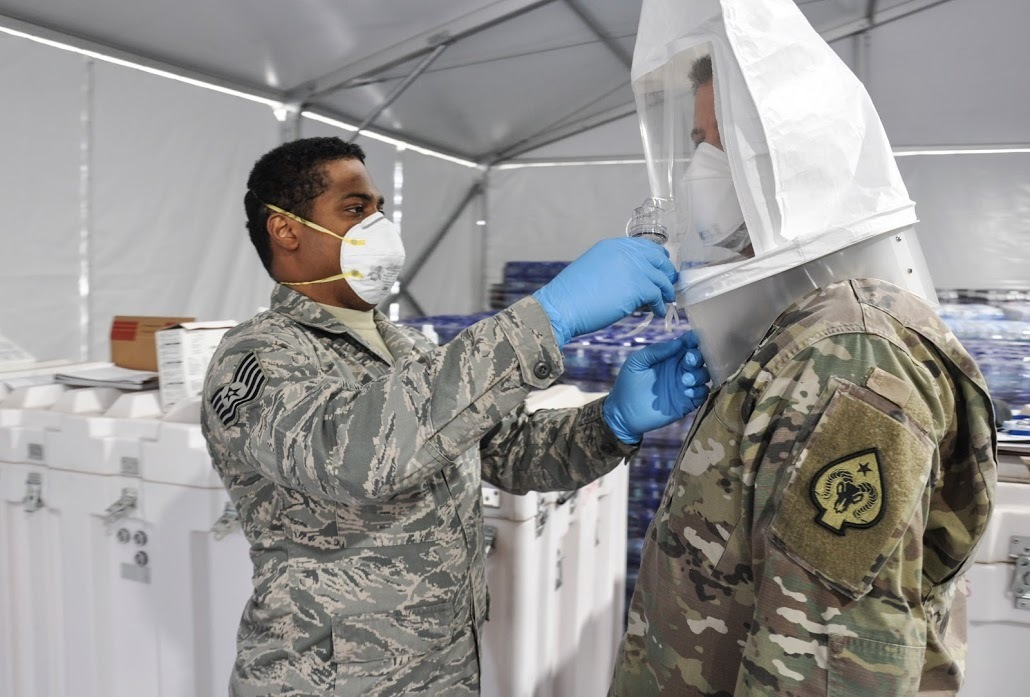
National Guard medical technician tests soldiers' respirator fit in Las Vegas

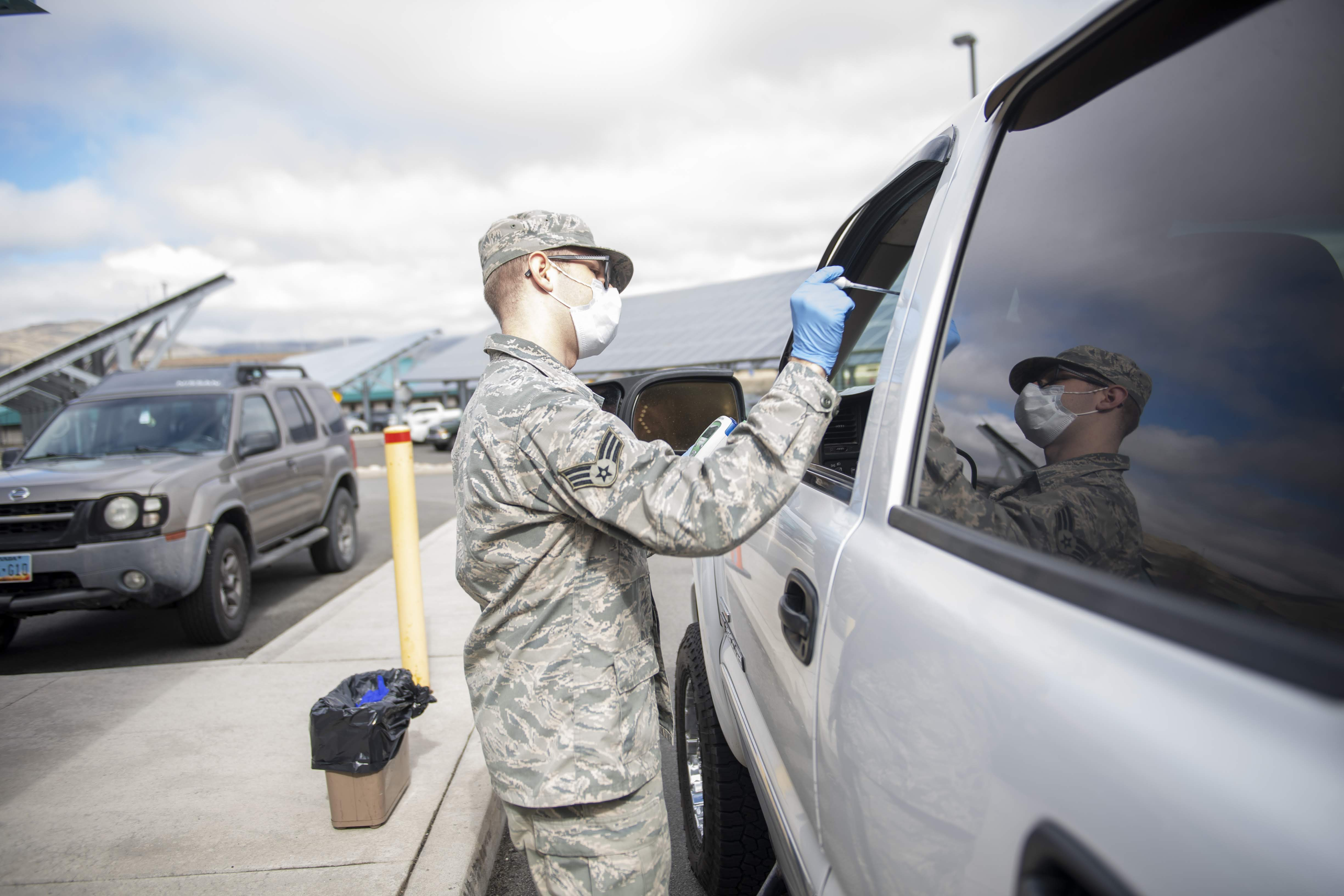
National Guard medical technician checking the temperature of a soldier in Carson City

In early 2020, the state began preparing for a potential coronavirus outbreak. On March 22, 2020, Sisolak named businessman Jim Murren to lead the state's COVID-19 Response, Relief & Recovery Task Force. In Clark County, the Southern Nevada Water Authority began monitoring sewage water that month, to detect the virus and help predict areas where it could break out.

On April 1, 2020, Sisolak activated the Nevada National Guard to help deliver medical supplies. Within a few weeks, he announced that an additional 700 members of the National Guard would join the coronavirus efforts. Most of them would be stationed in Las Vegas, where they would set up alternate care facilities, help with food banks, and provide medical support. The Nevada National Guard concluded its mission on April 1, 2022, after two years. It was the longest activation in Nevada history since World War II.

In June 2020, Clark County reported the state's first case of multisystem inflammatory syndrome in children (MIS-C), a disease caused by COVID-19. In August 2020, Reno reported the first U.S. case of COVID-19 reinfection. As of April 2022, the state had more than 22,000 reported reinfections, out of approximately 700,000 cases. As of June 2022, reinfections accounted for approximately 14 percent of all Nevada cases.

In January 2021, Las Vegas became the third U.S. city with a federally supported clinic offering bamlanivimab, a COVID-19 treatment. A European strain of COVID-19 initially made up the majority of cases in Nevada. Statewide, the SARS-CoV-2 Delta variant became the dominant strain of COVID-19 in mid-2021.

=== Testing ===
Nevada began COVID-19 testing on possible patients on January 29, 2020. The first positive case was reported five weeks later, and demand for testing subsequently increased. The National Guard worked with UNLV Medicine and University Medical Center (UMC), both in Las Vegas, to increase testing. UMC tested thousands of resort workers ahead of the casino re-openings. At the end of May 2020, UMC also began testing all of its patients for COVID-19, becoming the first hospital in Nevada to do so. UMC had the ability to perform 10,000 tests per day, the highest in the state. As of September 2020, UMC had processed 320,000 COVID-19 tests, approximately one-third of all tests performed in the state.

During the pandemic-related closure of casinos, the parking garages of several resorts in southern Nevada were utilized as drive-thru testing sites. Drive-thru sites also opened at Wal-Mart stores across the state in May 2020. Such sites continued to increase as more test kits became available, and cases were expected to rise as more sites opened.

In August 2020, an epidemiologist for the state's COVID-19 task force noted a seven-percent decrease in the number of tests being performed, compared to a month earlier. Possible explanations included decreased transmission of the virus, and people becoming frustrated with the testing process due to delays in getting appointments and test results. At the end of the month, Clark County launched a temporary COVID-19 testing campaign, which aimed to test 60,000 people over several weeks at drive-thru test sites. The county sent out an emergency alert to mobile computers, urging residents to participate in the campaign.

In late 2021, Chicago-based NorthShore Clinical Labs was hired to provide testing for young athletes in Washoe County. However, an investigation found the tests to be defective, missing 96 percent of positive cases. In January 2022, Sisolak announced that the state had purchased nearly 600,000 at-home tests which would be distributed to residents, in an effort to meet high demand for testing.

=== Mask policy ===
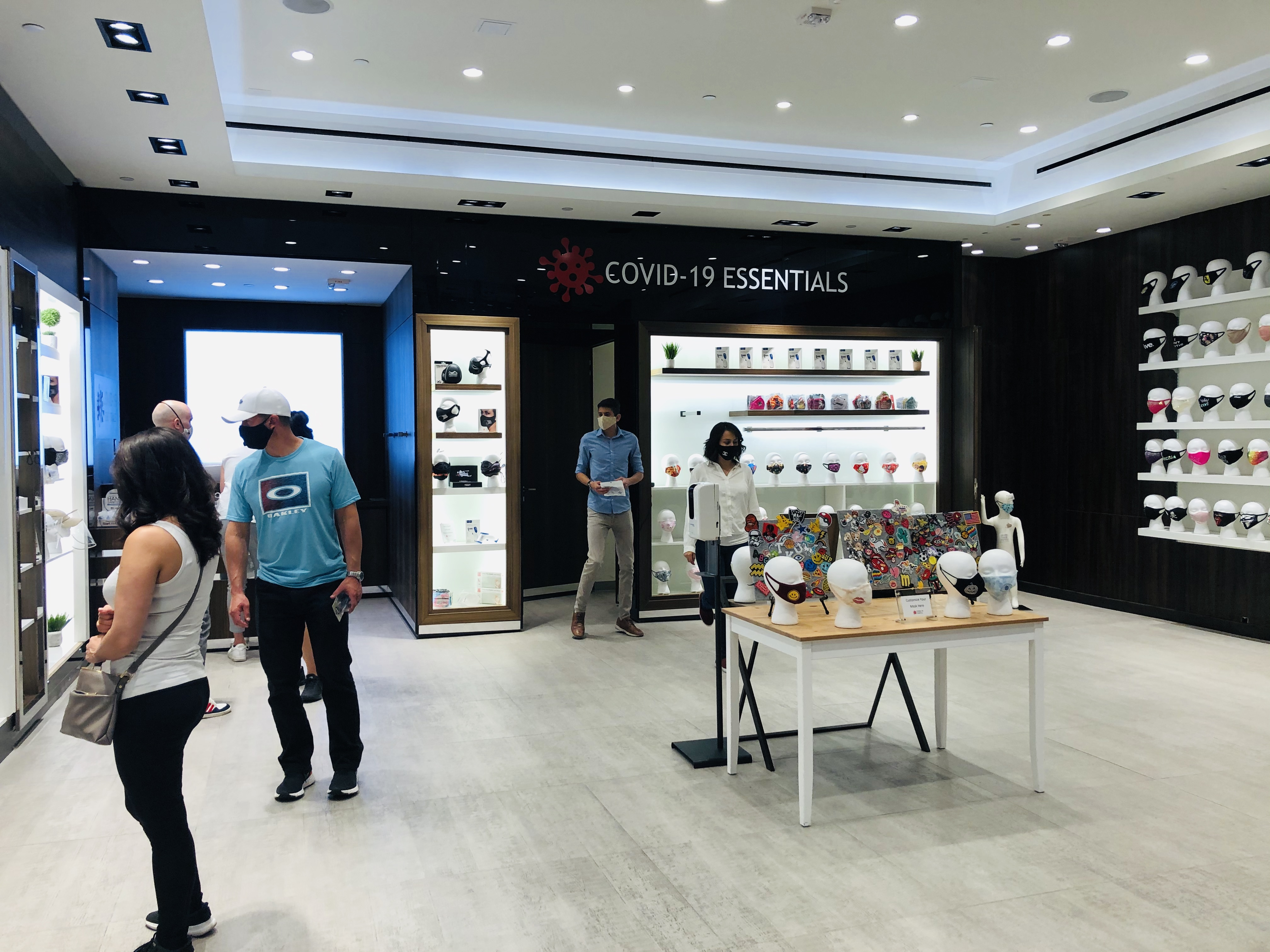
A COVID-19 face mask store at The Forum Shops in Las Vegas, October 2020

Las Vegas stores began running out of face masks in January 2020, as residents started purchasing them out of concern. Nevada initially did not issue a mask mandate for its residents, although Sisolak, in April 2020, advised their use while in public. He believed that no mandate would result in more residents voluntarily choosing to wear masks: "I think it's a matter of people not wanting to be told what to do." He also noted that such a mandate had already been made by Ohio governor Mike DeWine, who had to rescind it following outrage from residents there. Mayor Goodman opposed a mask mandate, believing the decision should be left up to residents and businesses.

When businesses began to reopen in May 2020, employees were required to wear masks. At the time, Sisolak said that many residents were also wearing them, but that some businesses were not complying as required and would face punishment: "Our goal is to continue reopening more of Nevada's economy in a safe and responsible manner. What we do now will determine what we can do next. That's why compliance is so extremely important."

In June 2020, it was reported that many visitors to the Las Vegas Strip were not wearing masks. Due to a statewide decrease in mask usage, the Nevada Gaming Control Board ordered that players and spectators of table games must wear masks if the table does not have protective barriers installed. As cases continued to rise, Sisolak asked his COVID-19 advisory team to review enhanced policies regarding masks for the public. The Culinary Workers Union said it would take legal action unless gaming properties implemented more COVID-19 safety measures, including a mask requirement for all casino guests and employees.

On June 24, 2020, Sisolak ordered the use of masks in all public areas, effective two days later. The Las Vegas Convention and Visitors Authority promoted the new requirement as part of a public service campaign. Mask exemptions were allowed for children under the age of 10, and people with certain medical conditions. Businesses were required to enforce mask-wearing among customers. In Las Vegas, it was initially reported that most people were following the mask mandate.

However, an analysis of 150,000 Twitter messages also found Nevada to be the second most-resistant state for mask-wearing, with Arizona in the top spot. A political action committee called No Mask Nevada was formed to oppose the mandate and hold protests, which Sisolak called "ridiculous". In July 2020, Las Vegas started sending city staffers to businesses to educate them about the mandate and to take note of violations. Las Vegas city council member Michele Fiore made a failed proposal to eliminate the program, referring to its team members as snitches. As COVID-19 cases increased, mask restrictions were expanded in November 2020, requiring gym-goers and people in private gatherings to wear them at all times.

In May 2021, in accordance with new CDC guidance, masks became optional for fully vaccinated residents. However, in July 2021, Sisolak reinstated the mask mandate for indoor public spaces in all counties deemed to have high transmission rates, with no exception for the vaccinated. The state would review new infection rate data on a weekly basis, and each affected county would need to see a two-week drop in cases for the mandate to be lifted. Sisolak ended the mandate statewide on February 10, 2022, citing decreased cases and hospitalizations. Nevada was among the last states to still have an indoor mask mandate. Masks were still required on public transportation and in federal facilities.

=== Hospitals ===
Hospitals began postponing elective surgeries in mid-March 2020, to help prevent the spread of COVID-19. Early on, social distancing was found to be well practiced in the state. Data from the Nevada Hospital Association, for the month of April 2020, showed that the state's hospitals were never in any danger of being overwhelmed by coronavirus patients, as social distancing diminished the virus' effect on the population. Nursing homes took precautions against the virus, but eventually saw a rise in cases.

Nevada hospitals initially experienced a shortage in ventilators; California loaned 50 units to the state until May 1, 2020, at which point they were no longer needed. Elective surgeries resumed several days later, with COVID-19 precautions in place. State hospitalizations saw a steep increase at the end of 2020, and some hospitals in southern Nevada began postponing elective surgeries once again. As of 2021, only one hospital in the state had an ECMO oxygen machine for treating the sickest patients: Sunrise Hospital & Medical Center in the Las Vegas Valley.

=== Contact tracing ===
On June 1, 2020, Sisolak announced plans to significantly increase contact tracing. These efforts included mobile apps for the public, such as Exposure Notifications Express. Early data showed that casino resorts presented the highest risk for possible exposure to COVID-19. Contact tracing was reduced in December 2020, amid a rise in cases which largely nullified such efforts.

=== Vaccines ===
In October 2020, Nevada joined other western states in a plan to review and approve the eventual COVID-19 vaccines, separate from the federal government's approval process. Nevada and other U.S. states began vaccinating the public on December 14, 2020, using the Pfizer–BioNTech COVID-19 vaccine. Doses of Moderna's vaccine began arriving in the state one week later for immediate use. Because Moderna's vaccine can be stored at higher temperatures, it was considered better for rural areas of the state, where extremely cold storage conditions would be harder to achieve. Both vaccines required two doses. Earlier in the year, Las Vegas was among areas in the U.S. where Moderna had conducted a study for its vaccine, due to the city's high number of cases.

Nursing home staff and residents, as well as hospital staff and law enforcement, were among the first to receive the vaccines. Early on, Nevada was ranked by the Centers for Disease Control as the worst U.S. state for vaccine doses administered for every 100,000 people. One reason for this was uncertainty regarding the inconsistent arrival of each vaccine shipment. Nevada also received low numbers of vaccine doses considering its population count. Doses were distributed proportionately to each state, based on population data from the American Community Survey, conducted a few years earlier. Nevada had seen significant growth in recent years which was not reflected in the outdated population figures, hence the low number of doses.

As of February 2021, the state had administered 500,000 doses, including first and second doses. The single-dose Janssen vaccine became available to Nevadans in March 2021, and the concept of vaccine passports was introduced in Las Vegas. Vaccinations for the state's general public, aged 16 and up, began on April 6, 2021. The state briefly suspended use of the Janssen vaccine that month, after six U.S. residents – including a Nevada woman – developed blood clots. Simultaneously, fewer Nevada residents were choosing to get vaccinated. Vaccination rates were particularly low among Latino residents, prompting organizations to launch a campaign which included Spanish-language billboards and pop-up clinics in Hispanic areas.

In June 2021, Sisolak introduced a two-month vaccine incentive program. Vaccinated residents would be eligible for prizes, with a new winner announced each week leading up to a grand prize of $1 million. The program, financed by federal relief funds, would have nearly 2,000 prizes worth a total of $5 million. Clark County also approved a pilot program to pay a $100 incentive to 1,000 residents to get vaccinated. The program was successful, leading to a renewal.

On August 20, 2021, the state reported that 50 percent of its eligible population had been fully vaccinated. By that time, proof of vaccination had become increasingly common for entry into sports events and entertainment venues, as well as college attendance. The state also required its 27,000 employees to either become vaccinated or get tested weekly. Vaccine mandates were subsequently announced for some government employees, including those working in health care and prison facilities. Some employees threatened to quit rather than become vaccinated, although the state did not expect this to be a major issue. The four-month vaccine mandate, which also applied to college students, expired at the end of 2021. As of August 2022, Nevada had one of the lowest COVID-19 vaccination rates in the U.S. for children under the age of five.

=== Statistics ===
In Nevada, COVID-19 was responsible for more deaths in April 2020 than those caused by flu and pneumonia in the same month during the prior two years. As of May 2020, Hispanics made up 31 percent of Clark County's population, and accounted for 27 percent of the area's 5,000-plus cases, becoming the hardest-hit ethnic group at that time. An antibody study, conducted in the Reno-Sparks area during mid-2020, found that COVID-19 testing was largely undercounting the actual number of positive cases, concluding that four to five times more people had likely been infected. As of September 2020, approximately four percent of cases had occurred in children under age 10, with one death occurring in the age group. People aged 10 to 19 made up nine percent of cases and accounted for two deaths. As of March 2021, 63 percent of deaths had occurred in people age 70 and older. As of March 2024, the majority of deaths had occurred in southern Nevada.

COVID-19 pandemic medical cases in Nevada by county
County (Note: County where individuals with a positive case reside. Location of diagnosis and treatment may vary.)	Cases (Note: Reported confirmed and presumptive cases. Actual case numbers are probably higher.) (Note: Includes 5,836 cases with incomplete data.)	Deaths	Vaccine	Population (Note: 2021 population estimate from "2020_ASRHO_Estimates_and_Projections.pdf" (PDF). Nevada Department of Taxation.)	Cases / 100k	Ref.
17 / 17	929,756	12,699	1,825,077	3,214,260	28,926.0	
Carson City (Note: Independent city; officially the Consolidated Municipality of Carson City)	18,391	248	36,507	57,222	32,139.7	
Churchill	8,248	128	12,389	26,242	31,430.5	
Clark	702,145	9,913	1,335,026	2,378,903	29,515.5	
Douglas	9,363	108	28,784	49,535	18,901.8	
Elko	13,091	154	21,693	54,035	24,226.9	
Esmeralda	123	5	334	971	12,667.4	
Eureka	130	2	595	1,885	6,896.6	
Humboldt	2,934	70	7,458	16,897	17,364.0	
Lander	1,169	23	2,267	5,992	19,509.3	
Lincoln	727	13	1,994	5,177	14,042.9	
Lyon	13,207	208	30,743	58,901	22,422.4	
Mineral	1,553	22	2,518	4,715	32,937.4	
Nye	9,768	316	22,348	50,156	19,475.2	
Pershing	2,303	32	2,707	6,775	33,992.6	
Storey	236	15	1,874	4,182	5,643.2	
Washoe	138,656	1,414	313,062	482,146	28,758.1	
White Pine	1,876	28	4,778	10,526	17,822.5	
Final update July 17, 2024, with data through the previous Monday; Data is publicly reported by Nevada Department of Health and Human Services

== Notable deaths ==
Name	Notes
Roy Horn	Las Vegas magician from 1967 to 2003; died there on May 8, 2020 (aged 75).
Tommy DeVito	Musician and original Four Seasons band member; died in Las Vegas on September 21, 2020 (aged 92).
Frank Cullotta	Former mobster and author; died in Las Vegas on August 20, 2020 (aged 81).
Bruce Williamson	Former lead singer for The Temptations; died in Las Vegas on September 6, 2020 (aged 49).
Ron Lurie	Mayor of Las Vegas from 1987 to 1991; died there on December 22, 2020 (aged 79).
Nathaniel Burkett	Convicted serial killer; died in Carson City on January 19, 2021 (aged 74).

== Impact ==
=== Bars and restaurants ===
Bars were among the non-essential businesses to close on March 18, 2020. Restaurants were closed for dine-in patrons but were allowed to provide drive-thru, takeout, and delivery services. Restaurants reopened for dine-in on May 9, 2020, as part of the state's phase one of business reopenings. Restaurant capacity was limited to 50 percent. The Nevada Gaming Control Board announced a few days later that restaurants inside casinos could also reopen, so long as customers did not have to cross the casino floor to access restaurants and restrooms. Another condition, applying to large counties, would be to limit crowding among customers waiting to enter. Sisolak said the reopening of casino restaurants was primarily meant to benefit small communities such as Ely – where dining options are limited – rather than places like Las Vegas. He had been urged by rural communities to allow the reopening of such restaurants.

Standalone bars were allowed to reopen on May 29, 2020, as part of phase two. Casinos reopened a week later, although buffets – a loss leader for casinos and a popular concept in Las Vegas – had yet to be given state approval. Some buffets soon reopened without self-service, utilizing other methods such as waiter service or to-go orders.

On July 10, 2020, because of a rise in coronavirus cases, Sisolak ordered the closure of bars in seven counties, including Clark. More than 30 bars in the county soon filed a lawsuit against Sisolak's shutdown order. The suit alleged that bars were being treated differently than other non-essential businesses, and stated that bars were largely in compliance with safety procedures. Two weeks after the lawsuit filing, Sisolak announced that bars in three rural counties would be allowed to reopen immediately. He expressed regret about the mass closing of bars in the state and said, "In hindsight, I don't know if that was the fairest way to do it," noting that many bars had complied with safety guidelines.

In August 2020, a judge ruled in favor of Sisolak's shutdown order on bars. Meanwhile, Sisolak put the state's COVID-19 task force in charge of decisions about when to reopen the remaining bars; they resumed business the following month. In November 2020, bar and restaurant capacity was reduced to 25 percent due to the latest rise in COVID-19 cases. In addition, restaurants could no longer accept walk-in diners and were only allowed to serve guests with a reservation. Restaurant capacity was gradually increased to 50 percent during early 2021.

=== Casinos ===
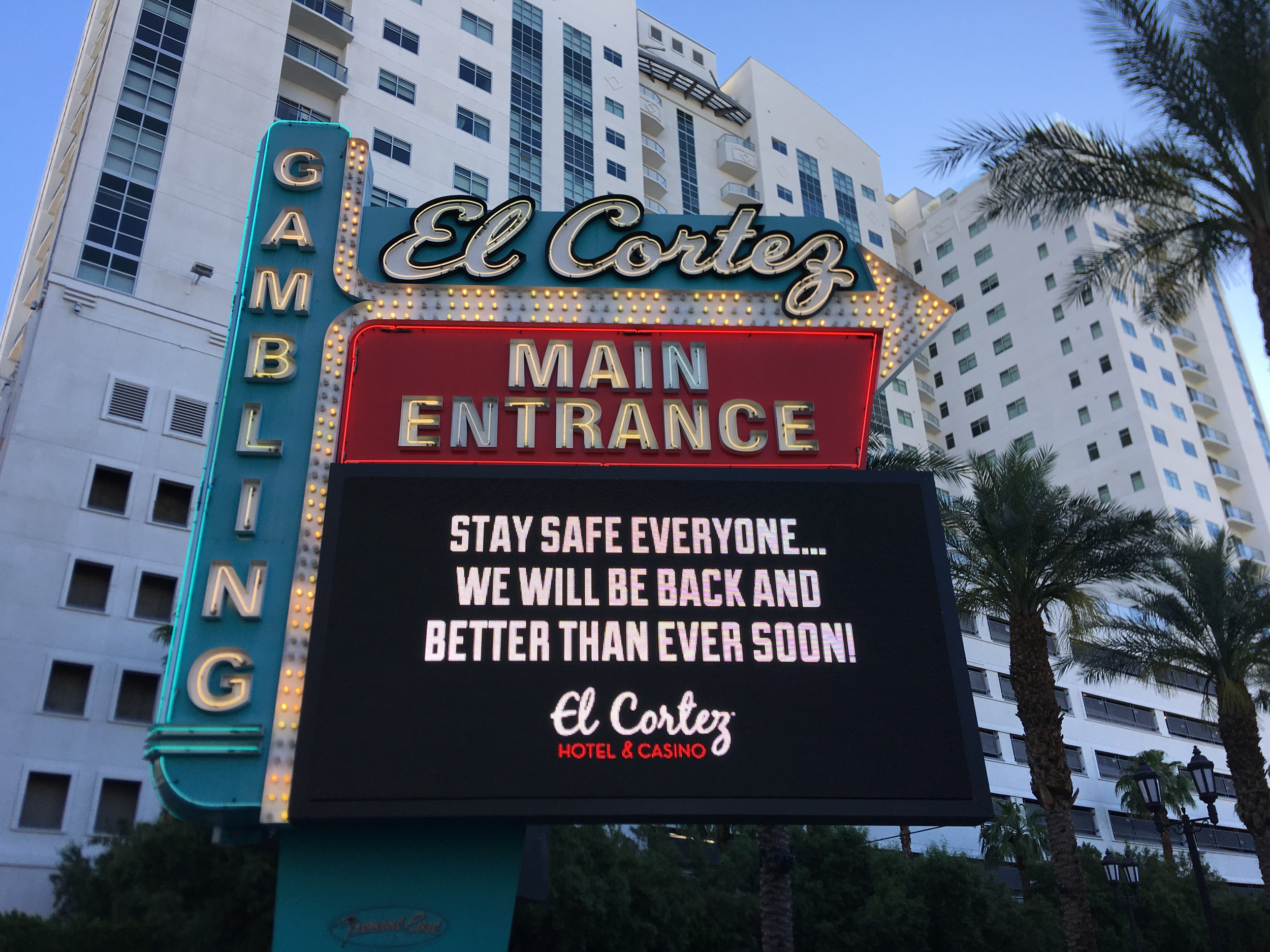
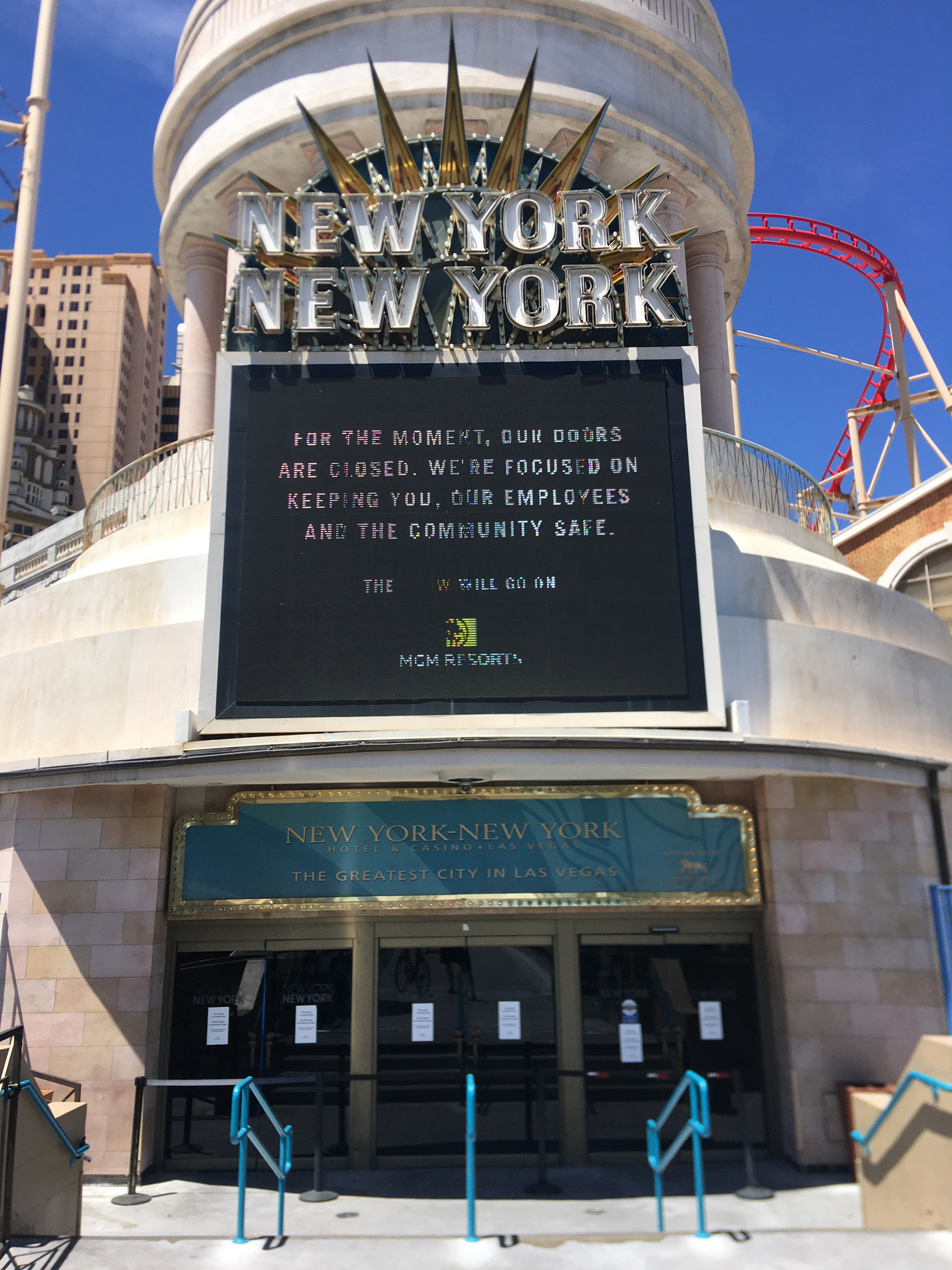
Closed casinos in Las Vegas, May 2020

Like other non-essential businesses, casinos closed on March 18, 2020. The statewide closure affected 440 casinos, as well as 1,977 businesses that operated small casinos with 15 slot machines or less, such as supermarkets, restaurants and convenience stores. It marked the first time that casinos on the Las Vegas Strip had been shut down since the state funeral of John F. Kennedy in 1963. Like Las Vegas, Mesquite's economy is also dependent largely on tourism and gambling, and was harmed by the impact of the pandemic closures.

In May 2020, the Nevada Gaming Commission gave unanimous and final approval to guidelines created by the Nevada Gaming Control Board, allowing casinos to soon reopen with reduced occupancy and increased sanitation. Questions remained with regard to the imminent reopening of casinos in Las Vegas. The Culinary Workers Union held protests, demanding specific information on how casino companies planned to prevent the spread of COVID-19 and keep people safe.

Further protests, regarding the murder of George Floyd, took place in Nevada at the end of May 2020, resulting in riots as well as clashes between protestors and authorities. It was believed that the Floyd protests could have a negative impact on the reopening of Las Vegas casinos, as the resulting civil unrest would discourage tourism. Prior to that point, the impending return of gambling had shown a pent-up demand, leading some companies to expand the number of properties set to reopen on the Strip. In response to the protests, the Las Vegas Convention and Visitors Authority cancelled an advertising campaign for the casino reopenings.

Select casinos began reopening as scheduled on June 4, 2020, after a closure of 78 days. Various safety measures were put in place. For example, employees were required to wear masks, and guests were encouraged to do so too, with free masks being offered. Guests' temperatures were also taken at entrances. Seating was limited at table games, and in some casinos, plexiglass shields were installed at gaming tables and hotel lobbies. Hand-washing stations were set up on the main floor in some resorts, and every other slot machine was inactive in order to promote social distancing. Within a month of reopening, employees at multiple Las Vegas resorts became concerned that safety precautions were not being properly exercised. Workers were also upset that casino companies withheld the number of employees who tested positive for coronavirus, although they were not required to provide such information.

In Las Vegas, resorts offered discounted rooms and various promotions to attract guests. Some properties also suspended their resort and parking fees, and initially reported a strong demand, more so than previously expected. For the remainder of 2020, motorists from California and Arizona made up the majority of revenue for the Strip.

Casino capacity was reduced from 50 to 25 percent in November 2020, amid the rise in COVID-19 cases. Some Strip resorts switched to weekend operations only, due to weak demand. Up to that time, locals casinos in Las Vegas had performed better than those on the Strip, where resorts are dependent on tourists. Capacity was gradually brought back to 50 percent during early 2021. At the time, there were 13 casinos across the state that had yet to reopen, and the number of poker tables in Clark County had decreased 33 percent from a year earlier, a result of the pandemic. Statewide, the 2020 closures caused an estimated $6.2 billion in gaming revenue losses, a decline of 25 percent from the previous year. Upon reopening, the state gaming industry would go on to report several record-breaking years of revenue.

=== Economy and finances ===
Nevada, especially Las Vegas, is dependent on tourism. A study in April 2020 found that Nevada's economy was the second most vulnerable in the U.S., as 17 percent of its GDP relied on tourism. Another analysis concluded that the state was most likely to be hit hardest by the economic impact of the virus. Among U.S. states, the American Hotel and Lodging Association reported that Nevada would have the fourth lowest state and local tax revenue for 2020, losing an estimated $1.1 billion. For 2020, Nevada tourism dropped to its lowest level since 1993. The Las Vegas tourism industry lost an estimated $34 billion that year, and the city's economy was not expected to make a full recovery until some time between 2022 and 2024.

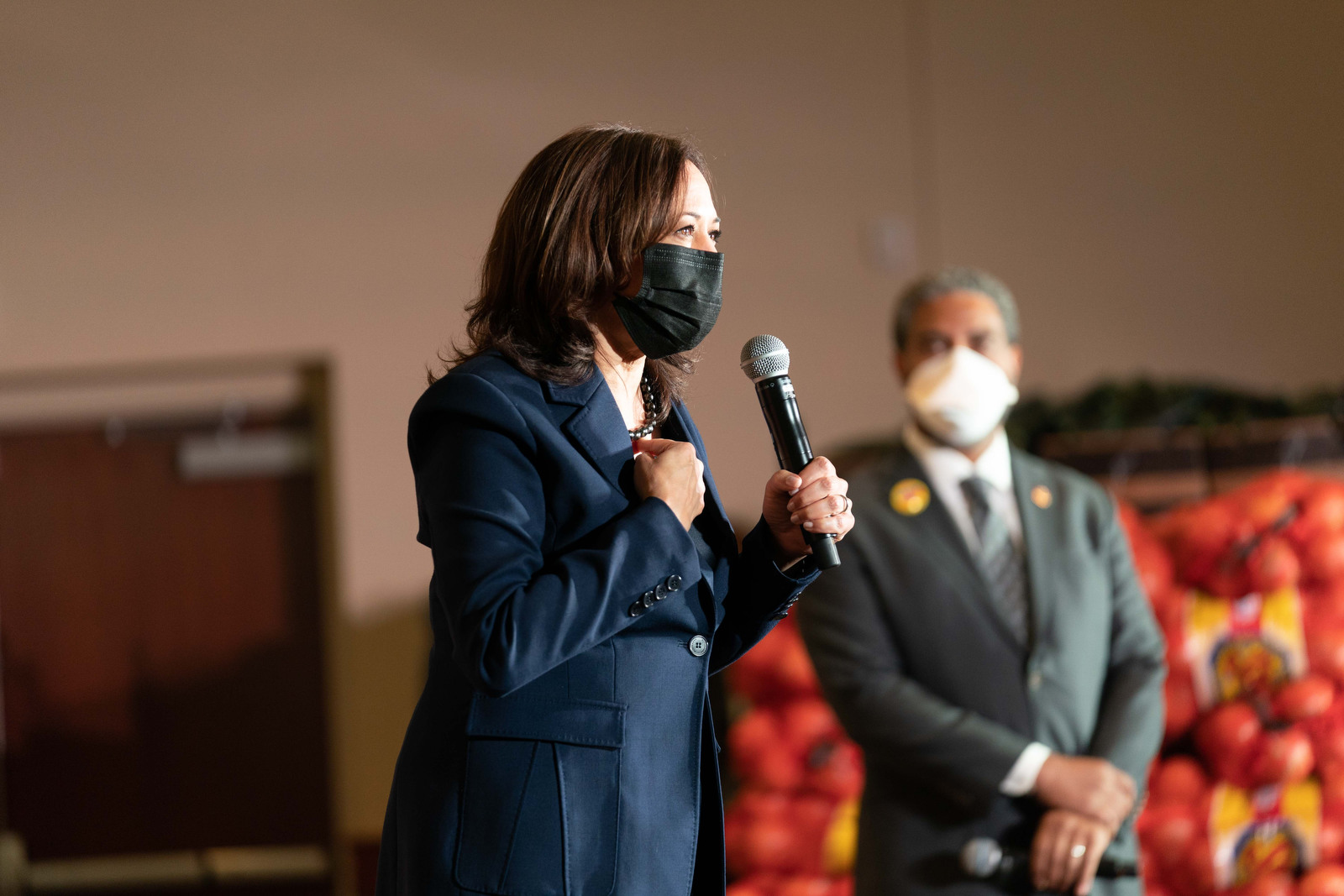
U.S. vice president Kamala Harris in Las Vegas to promote the American Rescue Plan, March 2021.

On May 11, 2020, Sisolak declared a fiscal state of emergency due to COVID-19's impact on the economy. The declaration allowed the state access to a $400 million emergency fund. Sisolak also proposed changes to the state budget. These measures included a salary freeze and the furlough of all state employees, both resulting in less than 50 permanent layoffs. Nevada faced a $900 million deficit for the budget year ending June 30, and a $1.3 billion deficit for the next year. The Nevada Legislature approved Sisolak's proposed budget cuts, which totaled $116 million.

The CARES Act, a 2020 national economic stimulus program, provided Nevada with $148 million in grants, to be divided between various counties and cities. Sisolak also introduced the Pandemic Emergency Technical Support (PETS) program later that year, providing grants to small businesses that apply. The American Rescue Plan, another nationwide stimulus program passed in 2021, included $4.5 billion in aid for the state.

=== Events and live entertainment ===
Various events, including concerts and shows, were postponed or canceled as a result of the pandemic. These included Burning Man, the Consumer Electronics Show, the AVN Awards, and an ASEAN summit. In Las Vegas, live musical entertainment was largely prohibited, except for ambient music. Promotion and ticket sales for such entertainment were not allowed, and dancing was also prohibited. Two long-running Las Vegas shows, Le Rêve and Zumanity, closed permanently as a result of the pandemic.

At the end of September 2020, Sisolak announced new guidelines which would allow for the return of live shows and conventions, with reduced capacity. Showrooms and theaters would have to submit safety plans, and such venues would be limited to either 250 people or 50-percent capacity, whichever is less. Large shows faced the difficulty of making a profit with such reduced capacity. Stadiums were allowed to admit 10 percent of their usual capacity, and conventions were allowed to proceed with a 1,000-person limit. The changes were considered to be among the most significant advances since the start of the pandemic. Officials in the entertainment industry applauded Sisolak's relaxing of COVID-19 restrictions. In response to rising cases, Sisolak issued new restrictions in November 2020 that limited capacity for many venues.

In March 2021, the state reduced the minimum distance required between performers and audience members, allowing for a broader return of shows. Signs of improvement soon became evident in the Las Vegas entertainment industry, with 39 shows playing throughout the area. However, this was down from an average of 150 shows prior to the pandemic.

=== Housing and commercial tenants ===
On March 29, 2020, Sisolak announced a 90-day moratorium on evictions and foreclosures for commercial and residential tenants. Owners of commercial space were allowed to begin evictions again on July 1, 2020, while certain residential evictions would resume a month later in the event that the eviction process began prior to the moratorium's issuance.

In the Las Vegas Valley, a housing assistance program was launched by the local government in mid-2020, providing financial aid to renters and mortgage owners affected by the pandemic. The program was funded through the CARES Act. In addition, the Clark County Commission unanimously passed a five-month emergency ordinance, making it illegal for landlords to refuse rental to people struggling financially.

Sisolak announced a 45-day extension of the residential moratorium on August 31, 2020. This would provide counties and the state government more time to fully implement programs – including short-term rental assistance – which would help landlords and residents. Landlords were critical of Sisolak for extending the moratorium only one day before its expiration, although he and his staff members had tried to avoid an extension. Landlords were still allowed to begin charging late fees for missed rent, and could also initiate no-cause evictions.

In September 2020, the Centers for Disease Control (CDC) issued a nationwide eviction moratorium, although some Las Vegas landlords still proceeded to evict tenants, citing financial losses. In December 2020, as the CDC order approached its expiration, Sisolak reinstated the state's eviction moratorium for three and a half months, then extended it again until the end of May 2021, while stating there would be no further extensions. The state subsequently passed a bill to protect renters facing eviction.

Despite the pandemic, Las Vegas home prices had reached record highs starting in mid-2020. Sales also increased, and planned communities in the area were among the top-selling in the country during the first half of 2020. The Las Vegas housing boom continued into mid-2021, and was attributed to low mortgage rates. However, Nevada had also seen an increase in mortgage delinquencies since the start of the pandemic.

=== Religion ===
In April 2020, Sisolak restricted religious gatherings of 10 people or more, but soon allowed for drive-in church services. In May 2020, the United States Department of Justice Civil Rights Division informed Sisolak that his 10-person ban could be a violation of the Free Exercise Clause, stating that churches were not being treated equal with businesses such as restaurants, which instead were allowed to operate at 50-percent capacity. A day later, Sisolak announced that religious facilities could resume in-person services with a 50-person limit through social distancing.

In July 2020, the Supreme Court of the United States ruled in a 5-to-4 decision that Sisolak had the right to limit church gatherings to 50 people. The decision came after a church in Lyon County challenged Sisolak's order, noting the 50-percent cap for businesses. A federal appeals court overturned the 50-person restriction in December 2020, allowing for 25 percent capacity instead. The ruling was based on a new decision issued by the U.S. Supreme Court. Churches were allowed to operate at 35 percent capacity starting in February 2021.

=== Rural areas ===
Several rural counties in Nevada reported their first COVID-19 cases within the first month of the pandemic reaching the state, and others were soon affected as well. As of July 2020, the city of Ely in White Pine County had experienced only a handful of cases and no deaths, both of which were attributed to its remote location in the state. In addition, the nearby Robinson Mine and Ely State Prison continued operations despite the pandemic, lessening its economic impact. Clark County's rural community Laughlin, with its casinos and outdoor activities, was able to rely on tourism to keep its economy going.

COVID-19 cases remained low in rural areas during mid-2020, although private gatherings were responsible for a majority of new cases later in the year. Esmeralda County, with 974 residents, was one of the few counties in the U.S. without a case, until November 2020. At the time, rural residents throughout the state experienced delays in receiving COVID-19 test results, waiting up to six days in certain areas.

Some rural counties were resistant to Sisolak's COVID-19 orders, with residents citing their desire for personal freedom. In Humboldt County, many residents did not take the virus seriously when it reached the area. At the end of 2020, White Pine County passed a resolution allowing the local sheriff and district attorney to choose when to enforce Sisolak's directives. A $50,000 county fund was also established to pay the fines for businesses that violate such directives. Lyon County declared an economic emergency and passed a similar resolution in January 2021, giving local businesses the option to ignore Sisolak's restrictions. Elko and Eureka County also passed resolutions calling for Sisolak to end business and gathering restrictions in rural Nevada.

=== Schools ===
On March 15, 2020, Sisolak ordered a three-week closure of schools, later extending this for the rest of the school year. Following the closures, children were educated through online distance learning. Schools throughout the state began providing free student meals for pick-up, to help families unable to afford food.

As of mid-2020, Esmeralda County remained free of coronavirus and was planning to resume in-person schooling, unlike large cities in the state. Sisolak said that decisions on how to educate children would be left up to individual school districts: "The number of students that are in a school in Lovelock is nowhere near the number of students in a classroom in Clark or Washoe (counties). They're different. Everybody's different, and that needs to be taken into account." In the years after COVID-19 reached Nevada, the state's school districts saw increased absenteeism and a decrease in the number of high school graduates.

==== Clark County ====
In contrast to Sisolak's order, Mayor Goodman had wanted schools in Las Vegas to remain open, with people assigned to all entrances to check student temperatures. After the closures, the Clark County School District (CCSD) provided free Chromebook computers to students who did not have access to a computer.

For the 2020–21 school year, CCSD said it was better-prepared for online learning compared to before. The district, for example, installed software to monitor online activity and keep students focused on schoolwork. As the new school year began, students and teachers encountered technical issues due to the high number of users. Parents of special-needs students also voiced opposition to distance learning, finding the method inadequate for their children. Some private schools resumed in-person learning for the new school year, causing concern that private students would receive an unfair advantage over online learners. Some rural CCSD schools also resumed in-person learning. The prolonged closures of most CCSD schools led to an increased number of student suicides, pushing the district to expedite its full reopening.

For students in grades K through third, CCSD began a hybrid format on March 1, 2021, with two days of in-person learning and three days of distance learning. Older students gradually began hybrid learning over the next five weeks. Clark County was the last in the state to reopen its schools for in-person learning, and the format would return for the 2021–22 school year.

==== Washoe County ====
The Washoe County School District (WCSD) began the new school year in August 2020, through a combination of in-person and online classes. However, a month earlier, the Washoe County Health District had recommended against in-person classes, citing the area's high infection rate. In addition, more than 100 Washoe County teachers had protested against school reopenings, stating that the facilities were not adequately prepared and that pandemic conditions were not yet safe for in-person learning. Hundreds of teachers – those most at risk for dying from COVID-19 – applied for distance learning accommodations, allowing them to safely teach from home. Shortly after the reopening of schools in Washoe County, 600 students were excluded from in-person classes due to various instances of possible COVID-19 contact.

=== Sex industry ===
The state's legal brothels, as well as strip clubs, were ordered to close in March 2020. Sex workers began offering escort and in-call service, but the legality of this was ambiguous. Later that year, a Nevada sex worker sued Sisolak over the brothel closures, calling them unconstitutional and arbitrary. A county judge declined the worker's petition to reopen the brothels, and she subsequently dropped her lawsuit due to financial limitations. Brothels and strip clubs were allowed to reopen on May 1, 2021.

=== Sports ===
Numerous sporting events were affected in Las Vegas, beginning on March 11, 2020, with the cancellation of the Pac-12 Conference men's basketball tournament, followed by the 2019–20 Vegas Golden Knights season.

The 2020 NFL draft was to be hosted by the Las Vegas Raiders, but festivities were cancelled and the entirety of the draft was instead conducted remotely. The Raiders' inaugural season that year was played without spectators. Las Vegas was subsequently awarded the 2022 draft.

UFC on ESPN: Woodley vs. Burns, taking place on May 30, 2020, was the first combat sports event to be held in Las Vegas since the pandemic lockdowns. Boxing matches were also approved to take place in a closed studio in an MGM Grand conference hall, with a protected "bubble" having been constructed to secure the boxers and essential staff.

NASCAR fall races at Las Vegas Motor Speedway were held as scheduled in September 2020, without live audiences.

=== Unemployment ===
State unemployment benefits are handled by the Nevada Department of Employment, Training and Rehabilitation (DETR), which saw a large increase in filings during the pandemic. Due to high demand, many residents had difficulty contacting the agency. Sisolak said, "We do not have the structure in place, I can assure you of this, to process this kind of volume. This department has never received the funding that it should have received. You could never expect a surge in claims anything like what we're dealing with right now."

DETR changed leadership several times during the pandemic, in one case because of threats made against its director. In Las Vegas, residents protested the agency over its slow response. DETR noted in June 2020 that it was handling 2,000 claims per day, up from the same amount each week prior to the pandemic. Despite complaints about customer service, DETR paid unemployment claims faster than most states during the early months of the pandemic. The agency stated that some unpaid claims were difficult to resolve due to disputes about employer separation.

At the end of April 2020, approximately 350,000 Nevada residents had filed for unemployment benefits, setting a record that was twice as many as the number during the Great Recession. Less than two weeks later, DETR reported a record-high state unemployment rate of 22 percent, up from 4 percent in February 2020. By the end of May 2020, unemployment had reached 28 percent, the worst for any state since the Bureau of Labor Statistics began tracking such data in 1976. During the first half of 2021, Las Vegas' unemployment rate fluctuated between 9 and 9.5 percent, the highest in the country. By July 2022, Nevada had recovered all of the jobs that were lost due to the pandemic, faring better than other parts of the U.S. where unemployment remained an issue. Nevertheless, the state still had the highest unemployment rate in the U.S. for the next year, at more than five percent.

=== Voting ===
==== Primary election ====
Barbara Cegavske, the Nevada Secretary of State, announced in March 2020 that the state would conduct its June primary election almost entirely through absentee voting, due to concerns about the coronavirus. Absentee ballots would be mailed to all active voters, and Nevada would join a growing number of states that planned to participate largely in absentee voting during the pandemic. Because of the pandemic, it was determined that each county would have only one in-person polling location.

In April 2020, Democrats filed a lawsuit against Cegavske, seeking additional polling locations for the primary, and requesting that a ban on ballot harvesting be lifted to better assist voters. The suit also requested that absentee ballots not be rejected on the basis of mismatched signatures, stating that election officials did not have the necessary training to verify signatures and that mismatched signatures would not hamper the integrity of the election. True the Vote, a conservative group, filed a different lawsuit against Cegavske later that month. The group alleged that mass mail-in voting would lead to voter fraud, although proven cases of such fraud are rare.

A judge ruled against True the Vote, stating that Cegavske had taken adequate precautions to prevent potential fraud. The Democratic lawsuit was settled; three polling places were set up in Clark County, and the county agreed to send mail-in ballots to all registered voters, rather than just active voters. True the Vote filed a revised complaint, saying that Clark County's voting procedures during the pandemic would give residents there an unfair advantage over those in other parts of the state. The judge allowed the primary to proceed with its mail-in aspect in place. U.S. president Donald Trump was a longtime critic of mail-in ballots, saying that they encourage voter fraud. In May 2020, Trump expressed displeasure with Nevada's mail-in voting proposal, and suggested that he might withhold federal funding to the state in retaliation, earning him criticism from Nevada Democrats.

Nevada held its primary on June 9, 2020. Despite the mail-in ballots, long lines still formed in Reno and the Las Vegas Valley, carrying over into early the next day. In-person voting accounted for 1.6 percent of all the votes cast in the primary, compared with 34.2 percent in the 2018 Nevada elections. The final primary results took 10 days to be released, due to the large number of mailed-in absentee votes. It was later confirmed that more than 223,000 mailed primary ballots had been returned to Clark County as undeliverable, out of 1.3 million ballots. However, there were no confirmed cases of fraud.

==== Presidential election ====
On August 3, 2020, Sisolak signed legislation to provide mail-in ballots to all of the state's active voters for the 2020 United States presidential election, becoming the eighth state to do so. The move was meant to protect residents from COVID-19 by minimizing in-person voting. Cegavske, the only Republican to hold state office, said she had no knowledge of the ballot bill until she saw a draft of it, a day before the Nevada Assembly voted on it. She criticized the Democrat-controlled Nevada Legislature for excluding her from discussions about the bill, and said it would cost an additional $3 million to implement it.

On August 4, 2020, in response to the mail-in ballot plan, Trump's lawyers filed a lawsuit against Cegavske on behalf of his presidential re-election campaign and the Republican Party. Trump claimed that mail-in voting could compromise the integrity of the presidential election. Large-scale mail voting was common in other states where the mail-in system was developed over a period of years, unlike Nevada. Nevertheless, the United States Postal Service (USPS) informed the state that there should be sufficient time for voters to cast their ballots by mail. Nevada was one of four states not warned by the USPS about possible mail-in issues. A judge eventually dismissed Trump's lawsuit.

During August 2020, Cegavske sought an emergency regulation from Sisolak for more oversight over ballot harvesting. Sisolak denied the request, calling it an attempt to use "the emergency regulation process for what appears to be political reasons." Meanwhile, Clark County's registrar of voters announced plans to reduce in-person voting locations from 159 to 125, due to difficulty recruiting workers. State law required that the county have at least 100 in-person locations. Trump ultimately lost the election to Joe Biden. Cegavske's office concluded an investigation in April 2021, finding no evidence to support allegations of widespread voter fraud.

== See also ==
- Timeline of the COVID-19 pandemic in the United States
- COVID-19 pandemic in the United States – for impact on the country
- COVID-19 pandemic – for impact on other countries
- U.S. state and local government responses to the COVID-19 pandemic
