= Woodlawn Cemetery (Las Vegas) =

- U.S. National Register of Historic Places
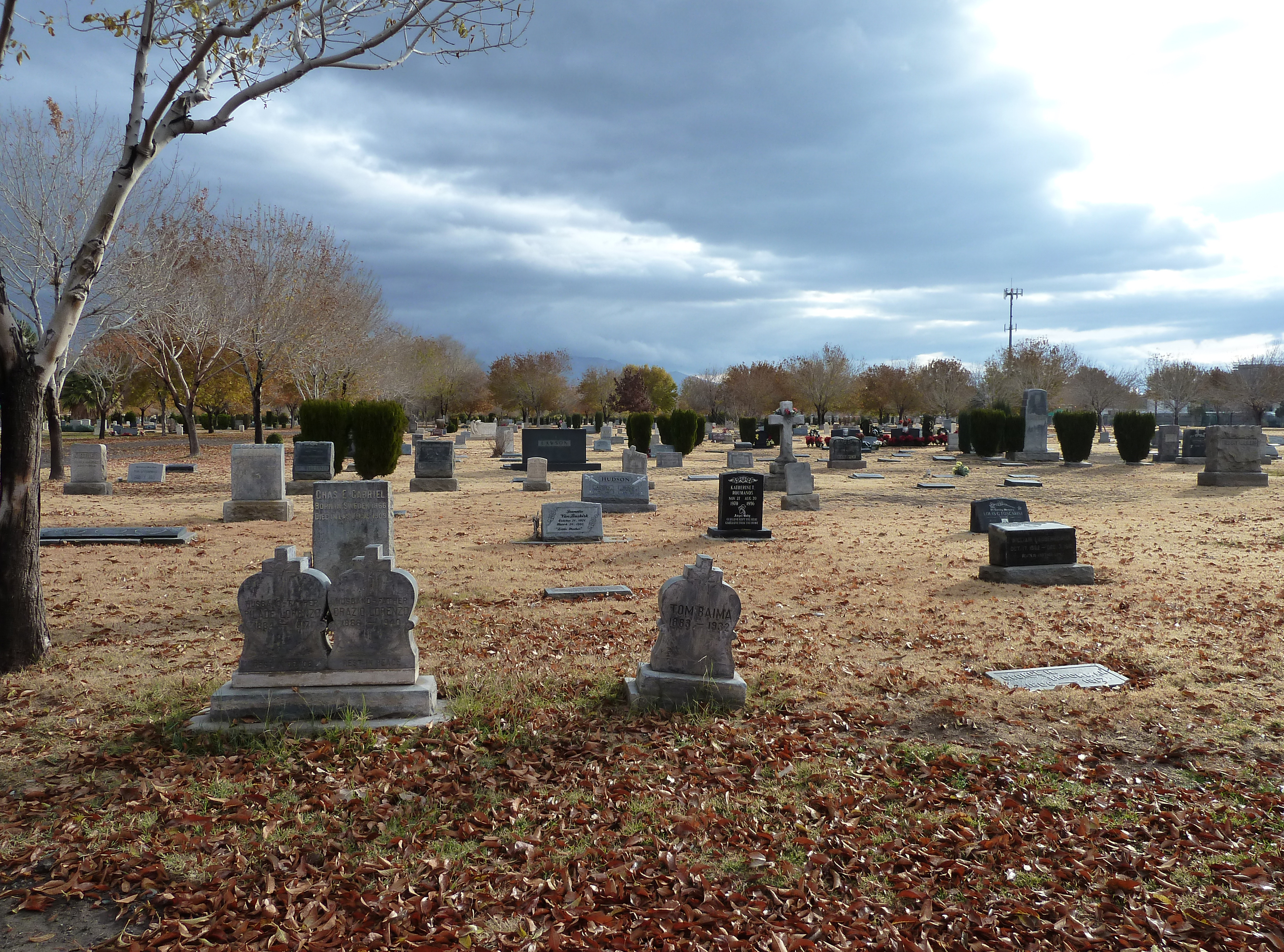
- Location: 1500 Las Vegas Blvd N Las Vegas, Nevada
- Coordinates: 36.1874°N 115.1294°W
- NRHP reference No.: 06001060
- Added to NRHP: November 21, 2006

Woodlawn cemetery, consisting of 40 acres (16 ha), is a cemetery located in Las Vegas, Nevada that is listed on the United States National Register of Historic Places. It is owned by the City of Las Vegas and is a stop on the city's "Pioneer Trail". It houses the Veterans Circle that commemorates the service and sacrifice of Nevada veterans.

== History ==
The cemetery opened in 1914 on 10 acres (4 ha) of land and was designed by J.T. McWilliams. The cemetery was listed in the National Register of Historic Places on November 21, 1968. It is located at Las Vegas Blvd and Owens.

== Interments ==
- William H. Briare (1930–2006), mayor of Las Vegas
- Frank Cullotta, mobster
- "Nick the Greek" Dandolos, gambler
- "Diamondfield" Jack Davis, gunfighter and prospector
- Mark Fator, 1922 American National Champion jockey
- Billy Guy (1936–2002), musician
- Chubby Johnson (1903–1974), movie actor
- Rhoshii Wells (1976–2008), boxer
- Edward Doll (1902–1967), gangster
