= Sue Wagner =

American politician (1940–2026)

30th Lieutenant Governor of Nevada
- In office January 7, 1991 – January 2, 1995
- Governor: Bob Miller
- Preceded by: Bob Miller
- Succeeded by: Lonnie Hammargren

Member of the Gaming Commission of Nevada
- In office 1997–2009
- Nominated by: Bob Miller

Member of the Nevada Senate
- In office 1981–1989

Member of the Nevada Assembly
- In office 1975–1980

Personal details
- Born: Sue Ellen Pooler; January 6, 1940 Portland, Maine, U.S.
- Died: March 17, 2026 (aged 86) Reno, Nevada, U.S.
- Party: Republican (until 2014); Independent (from 2014)

Sue Ellen Wagner (née Pooler; January 6, 1940 – March 17, 2026) was an American politician. She was the 30th lieutenant governor of Nevada, serving from 1991 to 1995, the first woman to be elected to the position. A moderate who was liberal on social issues, she was a member of the Republican Party until her exit in January 2014 due to the party's shift towards the Tea Party movement.

== Early life ==
Wagner was born Sue Ellen Pooler in Portland, Maine, on January 6, 1940. Her father was active in the Maine Republican Party until the family moved to Tucson, Arizona in 1950, where she grew up. She graduated with a bachelor's degree in political science from the University of Arizona in 1962 and with a master's degree in history from Northwestern University in 1963.

She served as Assistant dean of women at Ohio State University from 1963 to 1964, when she married Peter B. Wagner and moved back to Arizona, where she worked as a reporter for the Tucson Daily Citizen from 1964 to 1965. She then worked at Catalina High School, teaching government and history from 1965 to 1969 when she, her husband and their two children, Kirk and Kristina, moved to Reno, Nevada.

== Political career ==
=== Early political career ===
Her husband, an atmospheric physicist, worked as a scientist and associate research professor for the Desert Research Institute and she became involved in local politics, working on Pat Hardy Lewis' successful campaign for Reno City Council. She chaired Reno's Blue Ribbon Task Force on Housing and served on the Mayor's Citizen Advisory Board from 1973 to 1974.

=== Nevada Legislature ===
In 1974, she was named one of the ten "Outstanding Young Women in America" and was elected to the Nevada Assembly, where she served from 1975 to 1980.

The same year (1980), she was elected to the Nevada Senate her husband Peter, along with three other Desert Research Institute scientists, was killed in a plane crash in the Sierra Nevada mountains. Wagner served in the state senate from 1981 to 1989, chairing the Judiciary Committee for two legislative sessions, the committee through which all gambling-related bills pass. During her legislative career, she supported women's rights, helped create a fee on marriage licenses that funded women's shelters, increased funding for public and higher education, supported environmental protections and protections for at-risk children, required tests for infants for metabolic genetic disorders and pushed for increased governmental accountability and ethics reform. She was a driving force behind the creation of the Nevada Commission on Ethics and worked to pass a referendum in 1990 that prohibits the state from amending abortion laws without first winning approval in a referendum. She is noted for introducing and passing more legislation than any other person in Nevada's history and in 1989 was named one of ten "Outstanding National Republican Legislators".

=== Lieutenant Governor of Nevada ===
In 1990, Wagner ran for Lieutenant Governor of Nevada. In the Republican primary, she received 58,079 votes (75.50%), defeating anti-abortion activist Charles Frederick "Andy" Anderson, who received 11,965 votes (15.55%). The "None of These Candidates" option received 6,887 votes (8.95%). In the general election, Wagner faced Democrat Jeanne Ireland, the wife of University of Nevada, Las Vegas Athletic director Bill Ireland, and won with 173,262 votes (54.57%) to Ireland's 123,889 votes (39.02%). "None of These Candidates" received 20,343 votes (6.41%). She thus became the first woman to be elected to the position, though not the first woman to serve as lieutenant governor. Maude Frazier, who had been appointed lieutenant governor in 1962 to fill the remaining 6 months of the late Rex Bell's term, was the first woman to hold that distinction. The ticket elected in 1990 was a bipartisan one as incumbent Democratic governor Bob Miller had been easily re-elected.

Wagner had previously been urged by Republican leaders to run for Congress or governor and had been named as a potential vice presidential candidate for George H. W. Bush in 1988 by the National Women's Political Caucus. With Governor Miller eligible to run for re-election for a second and final term in 1994, Wagner was widely speculated to run in 1998 and was considered to be the frontrunner. However, on Labor Day, September 3, 1990, Wagner was seriously injured in a plane crash just outside the city of Fallon. She and Bob Seale, a Republican candidate for state treasurer, were on their way to Carson City from a Labor Day parade and annual Cantaloupe Festival in Fallon when the twin-engined Cessna 411 crashed shortly after takeoff. Seale had been flying the plane, which lost power in the right engine and he was trying to return to the airport when it came down. Wagner and Seale were seriously injured and Seale's wife Judy was killed. Wagner's aide Stephanie Tyler (who served the rest of Wagner's term in the state senate) and Seale's campaign manager Brian Krolicki (a future lieutenant governor of Nevada), who were also in the plane, were not seriously injured.

The crash essentially ended Wagner's elective political career. She broke her neck and back, suffered a punctured lung and several broken ribs and had to be placed in a body cast. Regardless, she won the primary and general elections but was still paralyzed when she was sworn in. She went through months of surgery and rehabilitation, suffering from a fusing of several vertebrae and a disease associated with her paralysis. Despite this, she was able to effectively serve as lieutenant governor, though she did not run for re-election in 1994. That year, she was named to the Nevada Women's Fund's Hall of Fame, received a lifetime achievement award from The Capital Women's Political Caucus and was named "Politician of the Year" by the Truckee Meadows Human Services Association. Upon leaving office in 1995, she received the Women Executives in State Government's "Breaking the Glass Ceiling" Award and became an associate director of the University of Nevada's Great Basin Policy Research Center. Also that year, she began teaching political science at the University of Nevada, Reno, mentored girls who were interested in politics and oversaw the Nevada Legislature's intern program.

=== Member of the Nevada Gaming Commission ===
In 1997, Wagner was appointed to the board of Wells Fargo bank and in April was named by Governor Miller to the Nevada Gaming Commission. Still suffering from her injuries, Wagner was provided with a special chair and would need to take breaks during some of the 12- and 14-hour-long meetings. She saw her role as different from how she had worked as a legislator: "A legislator seeks compromise, whereas a regulator sees it one way or another. I don't see [being a regulator] as consensus-building. Although, by placing a condition on a license or limit on a license, you could compromise by doing that." She frequently agreed with the committee's only other female member, Deborah Griffin, and the two were often the dissenting voices in 3–2 decisions to give applicants licenses. Interested in compulsive gambling, Nevada Gaming Control Board Chairman Bill Bible appointed her to a statewide committee that considered the problem in 1998.

== Retirement and death ==
Wagner retired from the Gaming Commission in 2009 and was awarded the Professional Achievement Award by the University of Arizona Alumni Association. She publicly opposed Sharron Angle, the Republican nominee for the U.S. Senate in 2010, though she did not endorse Democratic incumbent Harry Reid. In 2013, she was inducted into the Nevada State Senate Hall of Fame. In January 2014, she left the Republican Party, saying: "I did it as a symbol, I guess, that I do not like the Republican Party and what they stand for today... It's grown so conservative and tea-party orientated and I just can't buy into that. I've left the Republican Party and it's left me, at the same time." She then lived in south-west Reno, supported financially by a settlement from the plane crash.

Wagner died in Reno on March 17, 2026, at the age of 86.

== See also ==
- List of female lieutenant governors in the United States

Political offices
Preceded by Bob Miller	Lieutenant Governor of Nevada; January 7, 1991 – January 2, 1995	Succeeded by Lonnie Hammargren
Civic offices
Preceded by	Member of the Gaming Commission of Nevada; 1997 – 2009	Succeeded by
