= Oran K. Gragson =

American businessman and politician (1911–2002)

17th Mayor of Las Vegas
- In office 1959–1975
- Preceded by: Charles Duncan Baker
- Succeeded by: William H. Briare

Personal details
- Born: Oran Kenneth Gragson; February 14, 1911 Tucumcari, New Mexico, U.S.
- Died: October 7, 2002 (aged 91) Las Vegas, Nevada, U.S.
- Resting place: Palm Memorial Park, Las Vegas, Nevada, U.S.
- Party: Republican
- Relatives: Noah Gragson (great-grandson)
- Profession: Businessman politician

Oran Kenneth Gragson (February 14, 1911 – October 7, 2002) was an American businessman and politician. He was the longest-serving mayor of Las Vegas, Nevada, from 1959 to 1975. Gragson, a member of the Republican Party, was a small business owner who was elected Mayor on a reform platform against police corruption and for equal opportunity for people of all socio-economic and racial categories. He is, as of 2024, the most recent Republican mayor of the city.

After he became the mayor of Las Vegas, Gragson also became an integral part of the construction of the US 95 freeway. Gragson was at a Las Vegas church when he collapsed with a heart attack, and later died in a Las Vegas hospital on October 7, 2002, at the age of 91. The US 95 was named in his memory, and he was buried in a Las Vegas cemetery.

Gragson's grandson Scott became a real estate developer for the city, and his great-grandson Noah Gragson is a NASCAR driver who competes for Front Row Motorsports in the NASCAR Cup Series.

== See also ==
- List of mayors of Las Vegas

Party political offices
Preceded by Charles H. Russell	Republican nominee for Governor of Nevada; 1962	Succeeded by Paul Laxalt
Political offices
Preceded by Charles Duncan Baker	Mayor of Las Vegas; 1959–1975	Succeeded by William H. Briare
