= Jan Jones Blackhurst =

American businesswoman and politician

20th Mayor of Las Vegas
- In office July 1991 – June 8, 1999
- Preceded by: Ron Lurie
- Succeeded by: Oscar Goodman

Personal details
- Born: Janis Lyle Laverty; March 16, 1949 (age 77) Los Angeles, California, U.S.
- Party: Democratic
- Spouse(s): Fletcher Jones (divorced) Dana Blackhurst (m. 2003)
- Education: Stanford University (BA)

Jan Jones Blackhurst (née Laverty; March 16, 1949) is an American businesswoman and politician who served as the 20th mayor of Las Vegas, Nevada from 1991 until 1999. She was first woman to serve as mayor of Las Vegas. Jones Blackhurst is a member of the Democratic Party.

== Biography ==
=== Early life ===
Janis Lyle Laverty was born in Los Angeles, California, raised in Santa Monica, and graduated from Stanford University in 1971 with a bachelor's degree in English. She became a recognized figure in Las Vegas in the 1980s, appearing as a spokeswoman in television commercials for her family's supermarket chain, Thriftimart, and later a car dealership owned by her then-husband, Fletcher Jones Jr.

=== Mayor of Las Vegas ===
In 1990, Jones Blackhurst, known then as Jan Jones, ran for mayor of the city of Las Vegas. She was elected in 1991 and later re-elected in 1995, serving two four-year terms. During her time in office, Las Vegas' population grew significantly and Jones Blackhurst was credited for making the city "more livable" and directing attention towards social issues such as homelessness and LGBT rights.

She oversaw the redevelopment of the Fremont Street area, which opened as the current Fremont Street Experience in 1995.

While mayor, Jones Blackhurst ran for Nevada governor twice, losing significantly in the 1994 Democratic primary to then-incumbent Bob Miller. After gaining the Democratic nomination in 1998, she was defeated in the general election by Kenny Guinn, the Republican nominee. In 1999, she chose not to run for a third term as mayor.

=== Post-mayoral career ===
After her mayorship, Jones Blackhurst joined Caesars Entertainment, later serving as executive vice president. In 2007, she was quoted by the British newspaper, The Observer, as saying Celine Dion's husband and manager, Rene Angelil, gambled up to $1 million per week. She later retracted her comments and apologized.

Jones Blackhurst sits on the board of directors of several organizations including Caesars, the Las Vegas Convention and Visitors Authority, and the Las Vegas Stadium Authority, which owns Allegiant Stadium.

She is currently the executive director of the Black Fire Leadership Initiative at the University of Nevada, Las Vegas.

== Personal life ==
Jones Blackhurst is married to Dana Blackhurst, her third husband. They married in 2004 and she added Blackhurst to her surname. Jones Blackhurst has six children.

Dana Blackhurst is an education advocate for learning disabilities who has headed several schools over the years, including at The Chandler School (which he founded) and Camperdown Academy in Greenville, South Carolina and Pine Ridge School in Williston, Vermont.

They live in the master-planned community of Summerlin near the city of Las Vegas.

== Honors ==
In 2017, the newly-built Jones Blackhurst Elementary school was named after her by the Clark County School District near the Mountain's Edge neighborhood of unincorporated Enterprise.

Political offices
Preceded by Ron Lurie	Mayor of Las Vegas; 1991–1999	Succeeded by Oscar Goodman
Party political offices
Preceded by Bob Miller	Democratic nominee for Governor of Nevada; 1998	Succeeded by Joe Neal
