= Clark County District Attorney =

Elected district attorney of Clark County, Nevada

The Clark County District Attorney is the elected district attorney of Clark County, Nevada. The current Clark County District Attorney is Steven B. Wolfson.

As of 2021, the Clark County District Attorney's Office employs approximately 170 attorneys and over 500 support staff. It is divided into four divisions: criminal, juvenile, family support, and civil.

== Past district attorneys ==
No.	District Attorney	Dates in Office
1	W.R. Thomas	Appointed in 1909
2	O.J. Van Pelt	First Elected DA from 1910–?
3	?	?
4	A.B. Henderson	1916–1920
5	Harley A. Harmon	1920–1934
6	Roger Foley, Sr.	1934–1938
7	Roland H. Wiley	1938–1942
8	V. Gray Gubler	1942–1946
9	Robert E. Jones	1946–1950
10	Roger D. Foley, Jr.	1951–1955
11	George M. Dickerson	1954–1958
12	George Foley	1958–1959
13	Jack Cherry	Fall 1959
14	John Mendoza	1960–1962
15	Edward "Ted" Marshall	1962–1966
16	George Franklin	1966–1970
17	Roy Woofter	1970–1974
18	George Holt	1974–1978
19	Bob Miller	1978–1986
20	Rex Bell	1986–1994
21	Stewart L. Bell	1995–2002
22	David Roger	2003–2012
23	Mary-Anne Miller	January 2012 to February 2012
24	Steven B. Wolfson	2012–Present
