= Ron Lurie =

American businessman and politician (1941–2020)

19th Mayor of Las Vegas
- In office 1987–1991
- Preceded by: William H. Briare
- Succeeded by: Jan Laverty Jones

Personal details
- Born: Ronald Phillip Lurie; January 23, 1941 Los Angeles, California, U.S.
- Died: December 22, 2020 (aged 79) Las Vegas, Nevada, U.S.
- Party: Democratic
- Spouse: Beverly Lurie (m. 1965; died 2010)
- Education: Arizona State University and UNLV
- Profession: Businessman and politician

Ronald Philip Lurie (January 23, 1941 – December 22, 2020) was an American businessman and politician. He was the mayor of Las Vegas, Nevada from 1987 to 1991. Lurie was a member of the Democratic Party.

== Early life ==
Lurie, a person of Jewish ancestry, was born to Art Lurie, a supermarket owner, and Eleanor, née Gordon, in Los Angeles. Lurie arrived in Las Vegas when he was twelve years old.

== Career ==
Lurie worked for International Game Technology, helped develop the Lied Discovery Museum and the Las Vegas Natural History Museum, and also assisted in the development of the CAT Transit System.

Prior to being mayor, Lurie served on the city council for 14 years. In 1999, after completing his term as mayor, Lurie went on to several positions at Arizona Charlie's Decatur.

=== Death ===
Lurie had blood cancer and other health issues. In late 2020, he contracted COVID-19 during the COVID-19 pandemic in Nevada, and died shortly after in hospice. He was 79 years old, one month and one day short from his 80th birthday.

Political offices
Preceded by William H. Briare	Mayor of Las Vegas; 1987–1991	Succeeded by Jan Laverty Jones
