= Mark Fator =

American jockey (1904–1952)

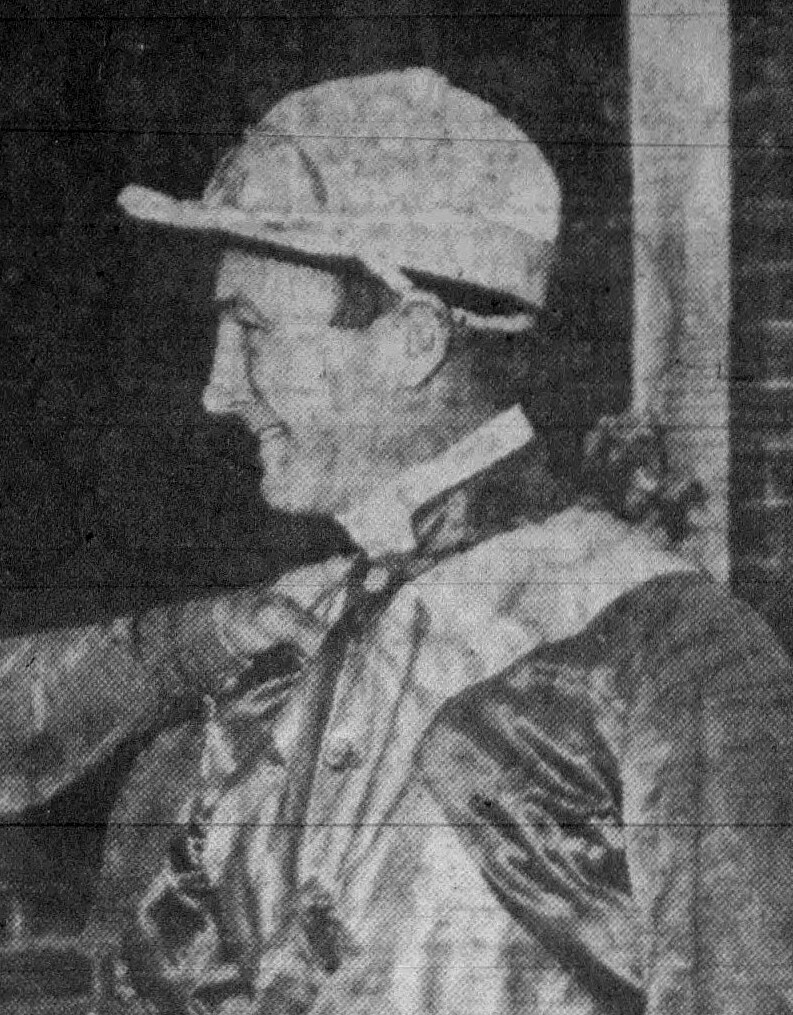
- Fator, circa 1942

Personal information
- Born: October 29, 1904 Hailey, Idaho, United States
- Died: January 16, 1952 (aged 47) Las Vegas, Nevada, United States
- Resting place: Woodlawn Cemetery, Las Vegas, Nevada

Horse racing career
- Sport: Horse racing

Major racing wins
- Durham Cup Handicap (1922); Epsom Plate (1922); Rothschild Cup Handicap (1922); Western Reserve Handicap (1922); William Mulock Cup Handicap (1922); Youthful Stakes (1923); Walden Stakes (1923); Castleton Handicap (1924); Fordham Stakes (1924); Hiawatha Handicap (1924); Olympic Stakes (1924); Altamont Handicap (1925); Saratoga Sales Stakes (1925); Illinois Oaks (1927); J. Fred Reid Handicap (1927)

Racing awards
- Thorncliffe Park Champion Jockey (1922); United States Champion Jockey by wins (1922)

Lester Mark Fator (October 29, 1904 – January 16, 1952) was the 1922 American National Champion jockey in Thoroughbred racing.

== Three brothers: three jockeys ==
The Fator brothers grew up in a small Idaho town and began their careers riding on Western United States bush tracks.

Eldest brother Laverne Fator (1899–1936) was riding for owner/trainer Stuart Polk who would sell the rising young star's contract in July 1919 to Harry F. Sinclair, owner of the renowned Rancocas Stable. Laverne Fator became one of the great jockeys in the history of Thoroughbred racing who in 1955 would be part of the U.S. Racing Hall of Fame inaugural class of inductees. For the astute Polk, it was not the first time he had recognized a potential major talent. In early 1917 he signed the unknown rookie Albert Johnson, a future Hall of Fame inductee. A year later, Polk sold Johnson's contract for a reported $15,000 to California horseman John H. Rosseter.

Brother Elmer Fator (1902–1970) rode with some success while under contract to the same Stuart Polk.

Always known by his middle name, Mark Fator was the youngest of the Fator brothers. Like them, Mark was originally signed to a contract to ride for Stuart Polk.

== National Championship year ==
Mark Fator rode primarily at the small tracks in 1922, the year that would be his most productive in racing. Among his successes, on July 21, 1922, he rode four winners at Maple Heights Park in Cleveland, Ohio, a track which was home to the Ohio Derby. Four days later on the same track, he won five races from six starts. In September, Fator was the leading jockey at Thorncliffe Park Raceway in Ontario, Canada and the following month he was back in Ohio competing at the Toledo racetrack where he again had a day in which he rode four winners.† At the end of the year he had won 188 races, the most of any jockey in North America.

== Rancocas Stable and later years ==
While finishing 1922 at the racetrack in Tijuana, Mexico, it was announced on December 31 that Stuart Polk had sold Mark Fator's contract to Sam Hildreth. The next day Mark Fator was ordered to return to the East Coast to join his brother Laverne as a member of the Rancocas team.

Riding for Rancocas Stable in 1923 and 1924, Mark Fator's most significant wins in 1923 came in Jamaica Racetrack's Youthful Stakes in May and in November, the first division of the Walden Stakes at Pimlico Race Course. In 1924, Fator's best results were all in New York where he captured the Olympic Claiming Stakes and Hiawatha Handicap at Jamaica Race Course, the Fordham Claiming Stakes at Empire City and the Castleton Handicap at Aqueduct.

Following his time with the Rancocas Stable, Mark Fator rode for many different owners until 1929. World War II caused a shortage of jockeys who either joined the military or worked in manufacturing plants making equipment for the war effort. Not having ridden for thirteen years, at age 36 Mark Fator and other jockeys such as 42-year-old Lavelle Ensor began coming out of retirement in 1942. During his later years, Mark Fator owned and trained horses. He remained involved with the sport, working as a patrol judge at two racetracks in Ohio, the Randall Park in North Randall and Cranwood Park in Warrensville Heights.

In December 1951, Mark Fator was diagnosed with heart disease and died on January 16, 1952.

- † Note: mistakenly referred to as "Martin"
