= Joe Neal (politician) =

American politician (1935–2020)

President pro tempore of the Nevada Senate
- In office 1991–1991

Member of the Nevada Senate from the 4th district
- In office 1973–2004

Personal details
- Born: July 28, 1935 Mound, Louisiana, U.S.
- Died: December 31, 2020 (aged 85) Henderson, Nevada, U.S.
- Party: Democratic
- Spouse: Estelle DeConge
- Education: Southern University (BA)

Joseph M. Neal Jr. (July 28, 1935 – December 31, 2020) was an American politician who served as a Democratic member of the Nevada Senate from 1973 to 2004, making him the first African-American state senator in Nevada. He served as Minority Floor leader in 1989 and as President pro tempore in 1991.

== Early life ==
Born in Mound, Louisiana, he served in the United States Air Force. Neal moved to Nevada in 1964 and earned a degree in political science and history from Southern University.

== Political career ==
Neal was inducted into the Nevada Senate Hall of Fame in 2005, a year into his retirement. At the time of his retirement, he was the longest-serving state senator in the history of the state. In 2002, Neal ran unsuccessfully for Governor of Nevada.

== Personal life and death ==
Neal married Estelle Ann DeConge in 1965 and together, they had 5 children: Charisse, Tania, Withania, Dina Amelia, and Joseph. Estelle died of breast cancer in 1997. Dina Neal served as a member of the Nevada Assembly from 2010 to 2020, when she took her father's former seat in the Nevada Senate.

Neal died on December 31, 2020, after a long illness. He was 85 years old.

Party political offices
Preceded by Jan Jones	Democratic nominee for Governor of Nevada; 2002	Succeeded by Dina Titus
