= Lonnie Hammargren =

American politician (1937–2023)

31st Lieutenant Governor of Nevada
- In office January 2, 1995 – January 4, 1999
- Governor: Bob Miller
- Preceded by: Sue Wagner
- Succeeded by: Lorraine Hunt

Regent of the Nevada System of Higher Education
- In office 1988–1994

Personal details
- Born: Lonnie Lee Hammargren; December 25, 1937 Harris, Minnesota, U.S.
- Died: June 13, 2023 (aged 85)
- Party: Republican
- Spouse: Sandy (m. 1989)
- Profession: Neurosurgeon

Lonnie Lee Hammargren (December 25, 1937 – June 13, 2023) was an American politician and neurosurgeon who served as the 31st lieutenant governor of Nevada from 1995 to 1999. Prior to being lieutenant governor, Hammargren also served a regent of the Nevada System of Higher Education from 1988 to 1994.

Hammargren, a Republican, was the most recent lieutenant governor of Nevada who belonged to a political party different than that of the sitting governor. He served with Governor Bob Miller, a Democrat, during Miller's second four-year term.

Prior to politics, Hammargren was a neurosurgeon and was as a flight surgeon at NASA for the Apollo program from November 1965 to March 1966.

He was also known for his eclectic collection of artifacts, including old casino signs, and an Apollo space capsule.

== Career ==
=== Medical career ===
Hammargren was a neurosurgeon and was as a flight surgeon at NASA for the Apollo program from November 1965 to March 1966.

He also operated on boxer Duk Koo Kim in November 1982, following Kim's loss to Ray Mancini; Kim died as a result of his injuries in the fight.

Following Roy Horn's near-fatal tiger attack in 2003, Hammargren spoke up to correct misinformation in the press about the procedure Horn (of Siegfried & Roy) had received. Hammargren has collected some of the skulls and brains of his former patients.

According to Hammargren, he gave up surgery in 2005, when the cost for his malpractice insurance was raised to $275,000/year; in 2009, as part of a medical malpractice settlement, he agreed to give up surgery permanently, though he retained his medical license. Hammargren's Nevada medical license expired in 2017. According to the Nevada State Board of Medical Examiners, Hammargren had four medical malpractice judgments against him that were $5,000 or more each.

=== Political career ===
From 1988 to 1994, Hammargren served as a regent of the Nevada System of Higher Education.

Hammargren was the lieutenant governor of Nevada from 1995 to 1999. He lost his election bid in the primaries for that office again in 2006. In 2008, Hammargren was the honorary consul for Belize.

== Personal life ==
Hammargren's Las Vegas home in 1980

Hammargren built his house, Castillo del Sol, in 1969, which he filled with various artifacts relating to Las Vegas history, and regularly opened it to public tours. Among his acquisitions were the High Roller roller coaster from the Stratosphere. His home has been featured on the Travel Channel's show Vegas VIP Homes. His collections eventually occupied two neighboring houses as well. Hammargren appeared in a 2014 episode of Pawn Stars, in which he attempted to sell some of his collection to show host Rick Harrison. In 2016, Hammargren and his collections were featured on an episode of the A&E series Hoarders. In the episode, it was revealed he had spent an estimated $10 million acquiring his collection and was $750,000 in debt. He sold 27 items at auction for a net gain of slightly over $4,000, which he planned to use to write his autobiography.

Hammargren married his wife Sandy in 1989, an event which in part was filmed for Lifestyles of the Rich and Famous.

On March 31, 2007, Hammargren held an "Awake Wake" for himself, in which he had a mock funeral service, a New Orleans style Jazz Funeral March back to his house, and buried himself in a sarcophagus in the Egyptian tomb in his garage. He emerged an hour later. In 2008, he began building a replica Orion spacecraft to add to the collection.

Hammargren died on June 13, 2023, at the age of 85 from a subdural hematoma, complications from dementia and heart disease.

Political offices
Preceded by Sue Wagner	Lieutenant Governor of Nevada; January 2, 1995 – January 4, 1999	Succeeded by Lorraine Hunt
