= 1910 Nevada gubernatorial election =

- November 8, 1910
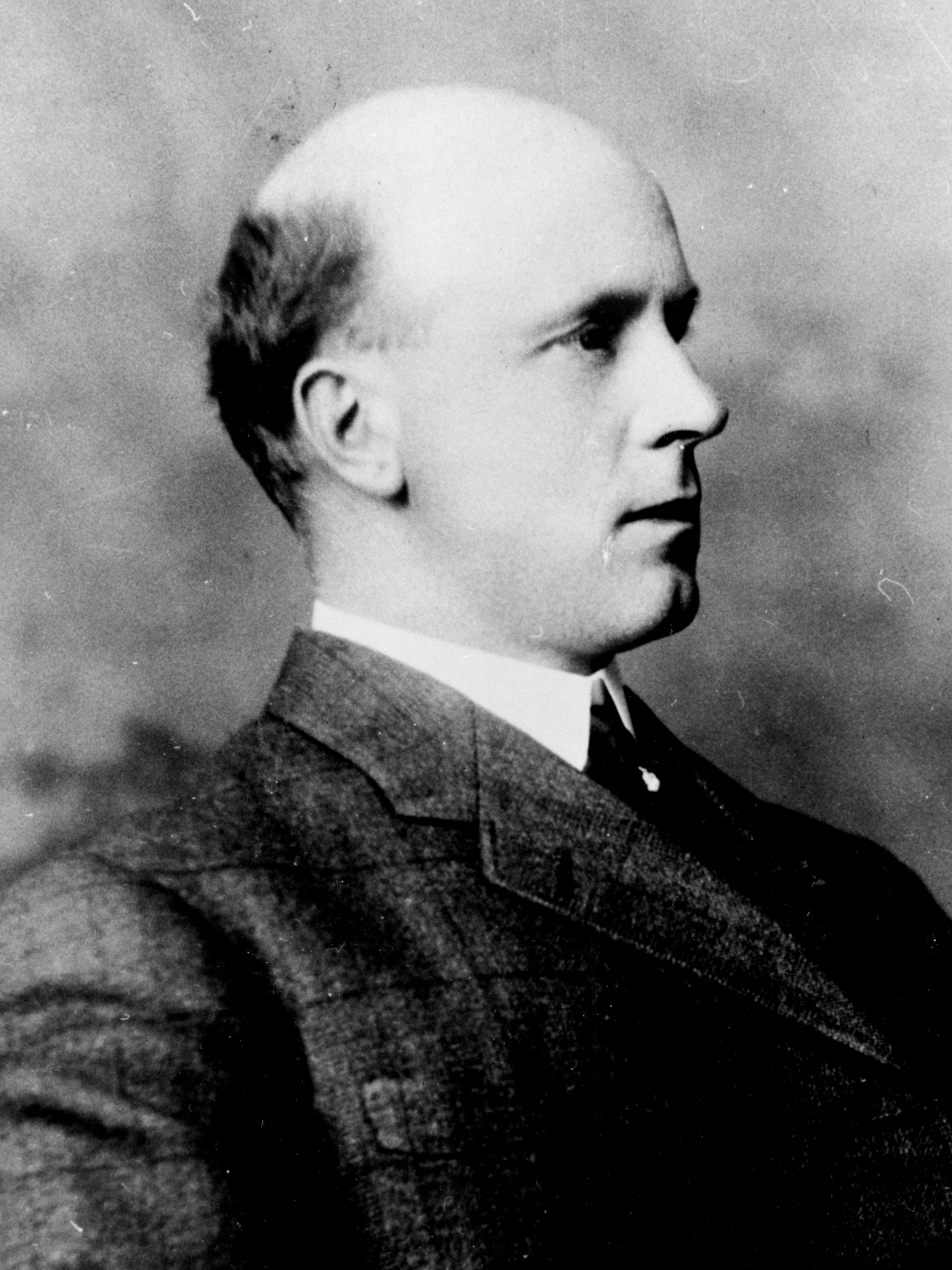

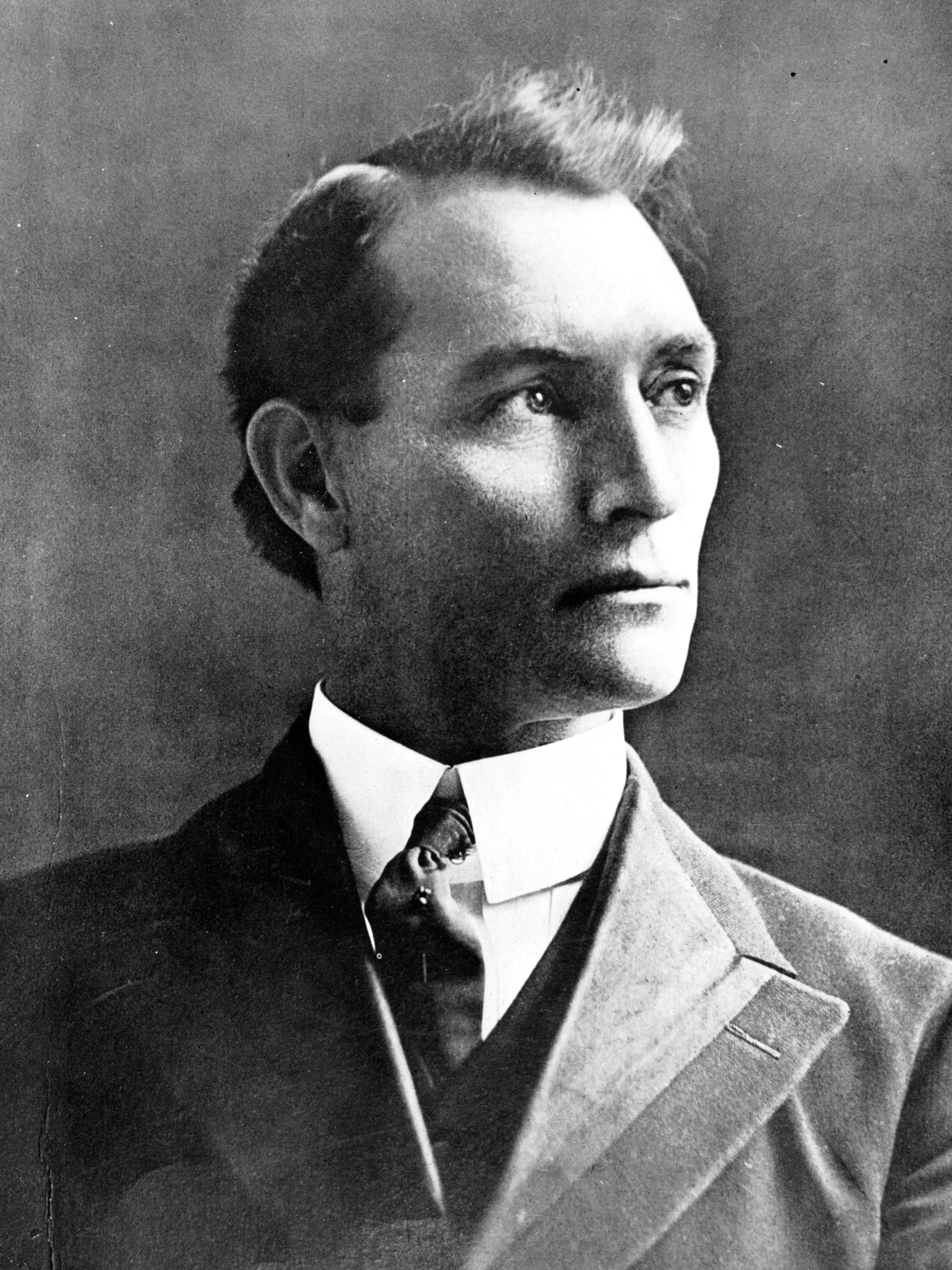

Nominee	Tasker Oddie	Denver S. Dickerson	Henry F. Gegax
Party	Republican	Democratic	Socialist
Popular vote	10,435	8,798	1,393
Percentage	50.59%	42.66%	6.75%
- County results Oddie: 40–50% 50–60% 60–70% Boyle: 40–50% 50–60%
Governor before election
Denver S. Dickerson
Silver
Elected Governor
Tasker Oddie
Republican

The 1910 Nevada gubernatorial election was held on November 8, 1910. Republican nominee Tasker Oddie defeated Democratic incumbent Denver S. Dickerson with 50.59% of the vote.

== Primary elections ==
Primary elections were held on September 6, 1910.

=== Democratic primary ===
==== Candidates ====
- Denver S. Dickerson, incumbent Governor
- Frank R. Nicholas

==== Results ====
Democratic primary results
Party	Candidate	Votes	%
Democratic	Denver S. Dickerson (incumbent)	5,031	76.87
Democratic	Frank R. Nicholas	1,514	23.13
Total votes		6,545	100.00

=== Republican primary ===
==== Candidates ====
- Tasker Oddie, former State Senator
- William A. Massey, former State Assemblyman

==== Results ====
Republican primary results
Party	Candidate	Votes	%
Republican	Tasker Oddie	3,109	51.31
Republican	William A. Massey	2,950	48.69
Total votes		6,059	100.00

== General election ==
=== Candidates ===
Major party candidates

- Tasker Oddie, Republican
- Denver S. Dickerson, Democratic

Other candidates

- Henry F. Gegax, Socialist

=== Results ===
1910 Nevada gubernatorial election
Party	Candidate	Votes	%	±%
Republican	Tasker Oddie	10,435	50.59%	+14.63%
Democratic	Denver S. Dickerson (incumbent)	8,798	42.66%	−15.89%
Socialist	Henry F. Gegax	1,393	6.75%	+1.26%
Majority		1,637	7.94%	
Total votes		20,626	100.00%	
Republican gain from Democratic		Swing	+30.52%	

=== Results by county ===
County	Tasker L. Oddie Republican		Denver S. Dickerson Democratic		Henry F. Gegax Socialist		Margin		Total votes cast
County	#	%	#	%	#	%	#	%	Total votes cast
Churchill	377	45.53%	332	40.10%	119	14.37%	45	5.43%	828
Clark	354	42.81%	419	50.67%	54	6.53%	-65	-7.86%	827
Douglas	217	47.17%	233	50.65%	10	2.17%	-16	-3.48%	460
Elko	854	46.92%	889	48.85%	77	4.23%	-35	-1.92%	1,820
Esmeralda	1,543	50.74%	1,344	44.20%	154	5.06%	199	6.54%	3,041
Eureka	282	68.78%	120	29.27%	8	1.95%	162	39.51%	410
Humboldt	783	42.26%	911	49.16%	159	8.58%	-128	-6.91%	1,853
Lander	344	55.22%	230	36.92%	49	7.87%	114	18.30%	623
Lincoln	287	47.83%	284	47.33%	29	4.83%	3	0.50%	600
Lyon	479	52.70%	352	38.72%	78	8.58%	127	13.97%	909
Nye	1,357	59.60%	699	30.70%	221	9.71%	658	28.90%	2,277
Ormsby	420	52.17%	358	44.47%	27	3.35%	62	7.70%	805
Storey	457	50.44%	419	46.25%	30	3.31%	38	4.19%	906
Washoe	1,953	55.86%	1,394	39.87%	149	4.26%	559	15.99%	3,496
White Pine	728	41.11%	814	45.96%	229	12.93%	-86	-4.86%	1,771
Totals	10,435	50.59%	8,798	42.65%	1,393	6.75%	1,637	7.94%	20,626

==== Counties that flipped from Democratic to Republican ====
- Churchill
- Esmeralda
- Eureka
- Lander
- Lincoln
- Lyon
- Nye
- Storey
- Washoe

==== Counties that flipped from Republican to Democratic ====
- Douglas
