= 1902 Nevada gubernatorial election =

- November 4, 1902
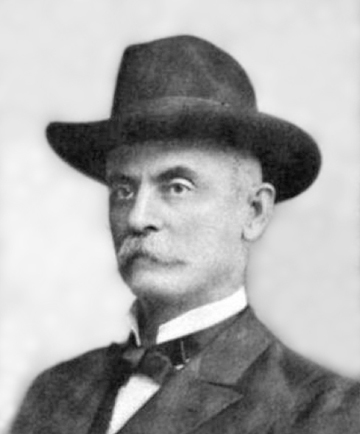

Nominee	John Sparks	A. C. Cleveland
Party	Silver	Republican
Popular vote	6,540	4,778
Percentage	57.78%	42.22%
- County results Sparks: 50–60% 60–70% Cleveland: 50–60% 60–70% No Returns
Governor before election
Reinhold Sadler
Silver
Elected Governor
John Sparks
Silver

The 1902 Nevada gubernatorial election was held on November 4, 1902. The Silver Party nominee "Honest" John Sparks defeated Republican nominee Abner Coburn Cleveland, with 6,540 votes to his opponents 4,778. He succeeded fellow Silver Party Governor Reinhold Sadler in office.

== General election ==
Unlike in 1898, when Silver Party Governor Reinhold Sadler faced off against Republican, Democratic, and Populist candidates, the state Democratic Party, the Populists, and the state Silver Party had essentially merged into one electoral vehicle (reflected in William Jennings Bryan's landslide victory in the state two years prior in the 1896 Presidential election, only four years after a Populist landslide). Cattleman John Sparks won and become the third of four Silver Party governor in a row.

Republican nominee A. C. Cleveland would die the following year, in 1903, and Sparks himself would die a year before his second term ended, in 1908.

=== Candidates ===
- John Sparks (Silver-Democratic), Rancher, businessman.
- Abner Coburn Cleveland (Republican), Cattleman, former member of the state Assembly and Senate, nominee for Governor of Nevada in 1894.

=== Results ===
1902 Nevada gubernatorial election
Party	Candidate	Votes	%	±%
Silver	John Sparks	6,540	57.78%	+22.11%
Republican	Abner Coburn Cleveland	4,778	42.22%	+6.76%
Majority		1,762	15.56%	
Total votes		11,318	100.00%	
Silver hold		Swing	+15.35%	

=== Results by county ===
County	John Sparks Silver & Democratic		Abner C. Cleveland Republican		Margin		Total votes cast
County	#	%	#	%	#	%	Total votes cast
Churchill	138	62.73%	82	37.27%	56	25.45%	220
Douglas	197	44.77%	243	55.23%	-46	-10.45%	440
Elko	765	54.76%	632	45.24%	133	9.52%	1,397
Esmeralda	250	53.08%	221	46.92%	29	6.16%	471
Eureka	283	61.79%	175	38.21%	108	23.58%	458
Humboldt	662	61.18%	420	38.82%	242	22.37%	1,082
Lander	280	66.35%	142	33.65%	138	32.70%	422
Lincoln	321	49.84%	323	50.16%	-2	-0.31%	644
Lyon	335	56.88%	254	43.12%	81	13.75%	589
Nye	603	67.68%	288	32.32%	315	35.35%	891
Ormsby	385	51.06%	369	48.94%	16	2.12%	754
Storey	567	56.76%	432	43.24%	135	13.51%	999
Washoe	1,536	64.70%	838	35.30%	698	29.40%	2,374
White Pine	218	37.78%	359	62.22%	-141	-24.44%	577
Totals	6,540	57.78%	4,778	42.22%	1,762	15.57%	11,318

==== Counties that flipped from Republican to Silver ====
- Churchill
- Lyon
- Storey
- Washoe

==== Counties that flipped from Silver to Republican ====
- Lincoln (Note: Lincoln County was carried by the Democratic candidate in 1898; the Silver and Democratic parties were not fused in 1898)
- White Pine
