= Governor Sparks =

Governor Sparks may refer to:

- Chauncey Sparks (1884–1968), 41st Governor of Alabama
- John Sparks (Nevada politician) (1843–1908), 10th Governor of Nevada
