= Silver Party =

1892–1911 political party in the US

- Leaders: John E. Jones; Reinhold Sadler
- Founded: 1892; 134 years ago
- Dissolved: 1911; 115 years ago
- Merged into: Democratic Party
- Ideology: Bimetallism; Free silver Liberalism
- Political position: Center-left
- Colors: Silver
- Senate (1896–97): 2 / 90 (peak)
- House of Representatives (1892): 1 / 356 (peak)

The Silver Party was a political party in the United States which supported a platform of bimetallism and free silver. It was active from 1892 until 1911, and was most successful in Nevada.

In 1892, several Silver Party candidates were elected to Nevada public offices. The party's success continued throughout the decade, culminating in the election of Governors John E. Jones and Reinhold Sadler. Nevada was the only state to elect both senators and congressional representatives from the Silver Party.

Nationally, the Silver Party aligned with the Populist Party and to a lesser extent with the Silver Republican Party. However, the 1896 Democratic Party presidential nomination of free silver advocate William Jennings Bryan moved many Silver Party members towards the Democrats. By 1902, most pro-silver factions in Nevada had been absorbed by the state Democratic Party organization.

== Notable members ==
- James Yancy Callahan – congressional delegate from the Oklahoma Territory
- Denver S. Dickerson – lieutenant governor of Nevada (1907–1908) and governor of Nevada (1908–1911)
- John Gregovich – member of the Nevada Senate (1894–1898)
- John E. Jones – governor of Nevada (1895–1896)
- John P. Jones – senator from Nevada
- Reinhold Sadler – lieutenant governor of Nevada (1895–1896) and governor of Nevada (1896–1903)
- John Sparks – governor of Nevada (1903–1908)
- William M. Stewart – senator from Nevada

== Electoral history ==
=== Federal elections (Nevada) ===
U.S. representative					U.S. senator				
Year	Nominee	# votes	% votes	Place	Year	Seat	Nominee	Legislature Vote	Place
1892	Francis G. Newlands	7,171	72.60 / 100	Elected	1893	Class 1	William M. Stewart	45 / 45 (100%)	Re-elected (Note: Had been elected previously in 1887 as a Republican.)
1894	Francis G. Newlands	4,581	44.81 / 100	Re-elected	1897	Class 3	John P. Jones (Note: Was elected as a Silver Republican, but was supported by the Silver Party in the legislature vote.)	40 / 45 (89%)	Re-elected (Note: Had been re-elected previously in 1891 as a Republican.)
1896	Francis G. Newlands (Note: Joint nomination between Silver and Democratic parties)	6,529	66.65 / 100	Re-elected	1899	Class 1	William M. Stewart (Replacing Francis Newlands) (Note: Francis Newlands had been nominated by the Silver Party to contest Stewart's seat, but withdrew in Stewart's favor the day of the vote.)	24 / 44 (55%)	Re-elected
1898	Francis G. Newlands	5,766	64.95 / 100	Re-elected	1903	Class 3	Francis G. Newlands	43 / 51 (84%)	Elected
1900	Francis G. Newlands	5,975	58.78 / 100	Re-elected	1905	Class 1	John Sparks	25 / 56 (45%)	2nd
1902	Clarence D. Van Duzer	5,848	53.55 / 100	Elected					
1904	Clarence D. Van Duzer	5,525	48.47 / 100	Re-elected					
1906	George A. Bartlett	7,320	51.42 / 100	Elected					

=== State elections (Nevada) ===
	Governor				Lieutenant governor				Secretary of state			
Year	Nominee	# votes	% votes	Place	Nominee	# votes	% votes	Place	Nominee	# votes	% votes	Place
1894	John E. Jones	5,223	50.60 / 100	Elected	Reinhold Sadler	5,967	59.34 / 100	Elected	Eugene Howell	5,559	55.67 / 100	Elected
1898	Reinhold Sadler	3,570	35.67 / 100	Re-elected	James R. Judge	3,663	37.87 / 100	Elected	Eugene Howell	4,318	44.55 / 100	Re-elected
1902	John Sparks	6,540	57.78 / 100	Elected	Lemuel Allen	6,296	57.11 / 100	Elected	Eugene Howell	5,445	49.25 / 100	2nd
1906	John Sparks	8,686	58.55 / 100	Re-elected	Denver S. Dickerson	6,849	47.98 / 100	Elected	Frank Mannix	6,283	43.74 / 100	2nd
	Attorney general				Treasurer				Controller			
Year	Nominee	# votes	% votes	Place	Nominee	# votes	% votes	Place	Nominee	# votes	% votes	Place
1894	Robert M. Beatty	5,007	51.97 / 100	Elected	William J. Westerfield	5,326	53.29 / 100	Elected	C.A. LaGrave	5,019	52.82 / 100	Elected
1898	William D. Jones	4,407	46.10 / 100	Elected	David M. Ryan	4,731	49.09 / 100	Elected	Samuel P. Davis	2,918	30.08 / 100	Elected
1902	James G. Sweeney	6,268	56.65 / 100	Elected	David M. Ryan	6,145	55.57 / 100	Elected	Samuel P. Davis	5,705	51.92 / 100	Re-elected
1906	Richard C. Stoddard	6,917	48.59 / 100	Elected	David M. Ryan	7,321	51.03 / 100	Re-elected	Robert Raftice	6,235	43.85 / 100	2nd
	Surveyor-general				Superintendent of state printing				Superintendent of public instruction			
Year	Nominee	# votes	% votes	Place	Nominee	# votes	% votes	Place	Nominee	# votes	% votes	Place
1894	A.C. Pratt	5,793	59.99 / 100	Elected	J.G. McCarthy	4,710	46.80 / 100	Elected	H.C. Cutting	4,744	47.49 / 100	Elected
1898	E.D. Kelly	3,610	37.32 / 100	Elected	Andrew Maute	3,619	37.82 / 100	Elected	H.C. Cutting	4,168	43.81 / 100	2nd
1902	E.D. Kelly	6,441	58.84 / 100	Re-elected	Andrew Maute	6,226	57.27 / 100	Re-elected	J.E. Bray	5,467	49.95 / 100	2nd
1906	E.D. Kelly	7,169	50.09 / 100	Re-elected	Irwin G. Lewis	5,887	46.48 / 100	2nd	R.H. Mitchell	5,547	39.28 / 100	2nd
	Justice of the Supreme Court				Regent University, long term				Regent University, short term			
Year	Nominee	# votes	% votes	Place	Nominee	# votes	% votes	Place	Nominee	# votes	% votes	Place
1892	No candidate (Note: May have endorsed Charles H. Belknap, who ran unopposed.)				H.L. Fish	6,021	62.75 / 100	Elected	Charles E. Mack	5,884	62.52 / 100	Elected
1894	McKaskia S. Bonnifield	5,613	56.66 / 100	Elected	W.E.F. Deal	5,621	57.27 / 100	Elected	H.S. Starrett	5,279	54.83 / 100	Elected
1896	William A. Massey	5,307	53.14 / 100	Elected	J.N. Evans	5,370	56.10 / 100	Elected	H.S. Starrett	6,467	71.76 / 100	Elected
1898	Charles H. Belknap	6,898	76.88 / 100	Re-elected	W.E.F. Deal	3,892	41.15 / 100	Re-elected	H.S. Starrett	4,217	49.94 / 100	Re-elected
1900	Adolphus L. Fitzgerald	6,508	64.65 / 100	Elected	J.N. Evans	5,362	54.93 / 100	Re-elected	W.W. Booher	5,451	57.03 / 100	Elected
1902	George F. Talbot	6,305	56.87 / 100	Elected	W.W. Booher	5,818	54.38 / 100	Elected	Richard Kirman Sr.	6,106	57.34 / 100	Elected
1904	H.F. Bartine	5,588	48.10 / 100	2nd	W.J. Circe	5,262	47.25 / 100	2nd	Emmet Boyle	5,396	49.02 / 100	2nd
1906	James G. Sweeney	7,717	53.47 / 100	Elected	C.B. Henderson	6,118	45.95 / 100	Elected	Charles R. Lewers	7,040	54.79 / 100	Elected
1906					John Sunderland, Jr.	6,084	47.15 / 100	Elected	J.E. Souchereau	5,993	50.81 / 100	Elected

Nevada Senate					Nevada Assembly			
Election	Seats (including Endorsees)		Position (Note: Only takes into account members who were elected on the ballot as Silver or favored the Silver label in the case of a joint nomination; endorsed candidates are not taken into account.)	Control	Seats (including Endorsees)		Position	Control
Election	No.	±	Position	Control	No.	±	Position	Control
1892	5 / 15	New Party	2nd	Republican	15 / 30	New Party	1st	Silver-Democratic
1894	5 / 15	Steady	1st (Note: Tied with Republicans at (5) seats.)	Silver-Democratic	14 / 30	▼1	1st	Silver-Democratic
1896	7 / 15	▲2	1st	Republican minority	20 / 30	▲6	1st	Silver-Democratic
1898	9 / 15 (Note: Includes (1) endorsed Democrat)	▲2	1st	Silver	18 / 30	▼2	1st	Silver-Democratic
1900	9 / 15	Steady	1st	Silver	13 / 31 (Note: Includes (2) endorsed Democrats)	▼5	2nd	Democratic-Silver
1902	8 / 15	▼1	2nd	Silver-Democratic	19 / 37 (Note: Endorsements include (6) Democrats, (1) Independent)	▲6	2nd	Silver-Democratic
1904	7 / 17	▼1	2nd	Silver-Democratic	6 / 39 (Note: Includes (4) endorsed Democrats)	▼13	3rd	Republican
1906	2 / 17	▼5	3rd	Democratic-Silver	5 / 40	▼1	3rd	Democratic-Silver

== See also ==
- Silver Republican Party
- Silver-Democrats
