= Justice Bigelow =

Justice Bigelow may refer to:

- George Tyler Bigelow (1810–1878), associate justice and chief justice of the Massachusetts Supreme Judicial Court
- Rensselaer R. Bigelow (1848–1907), associate justice of the Supreme Court of Nevada
