= Governor Dickerson =

Governor Dickerson may refer to:

- Denver S. Dickerson (1872–1925), 11th Governor of Nevada
- Mahlon Dickerson (1770–1853), 7th Governor of New Jersey
- Philemon Dickerson (1788–1862), 12th Governor of New Jersey
