= John R. McConnell =

American politician

4th Attorney General of California
- In office January 2, 1854 – January 9, 1856
- Governor: John Bigler
- Preceded by: S. Clinton Hastings
- Succeeded by: William M. Stewart (acting); William T. Wallace

Personal details
- Born: 1826 Kentucky, U.S.
- Died: August 19, 1879 (aged 52–53) Denver, Colorado, U.S.

John R. McConnell (1826–August 19, 1879) was the fourth attorney general of California from 1854 to 1856. He ran in 1861 for Governor of California under the Southern Democratic party, but he lost to Leland Stanford.

McConnell was born in Kentucky. He died in Denver, Colorado.

Party political offices
Preceded by Milton Latham	Southern Democratic nominee for Governor of California; 1861	Succeeded by None
Legal offices
Preceded by S. Clinton Hastings	Attorney General of California; 1854–1856	Succeeded by William M. Stewart
