= Alamo Ranchhouse =

Historic house in Nevada, United States

- U.S. National Register of Historic Places
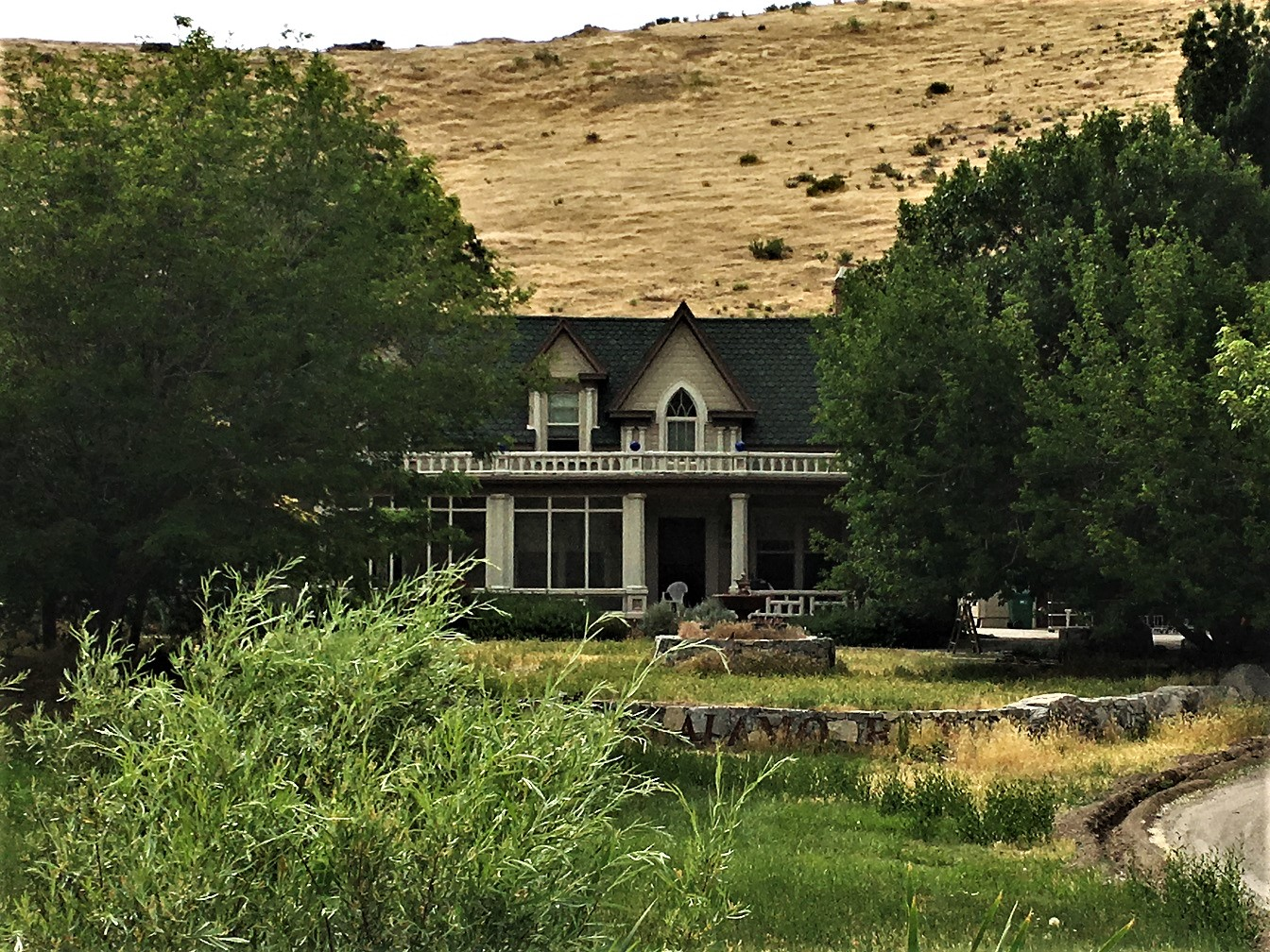

- Location within Nevada Location within the United States
- Location: Southwest of Steamboat at 20205 S. Virginia St.
- Nearest city: Steamboat, Nevada
- Coordinates: 39°21′51″N 119°45′18″W
- Area: 1 acre (0.40 ha)
- Built: 1887
- Architectural style: plantation style mansion
- NRHP reference No.: 79001466
- Added to NRHP: November 23, 1979

The Alamo Ranchhouse, near Steamboat, Nevada, is a historic "plantation style mansion" that was built in 1887. Also known as the Moffat Ranchhouse, it was listed on the National Register of Historic Places in 1979. The listing included one contributing building and one contributing structure.

It is significant as the home of John Sparks, governor of Nevada during 1903–08, and later as the home of "cattle baron" William H. Moffat. It was the center of what was once a 2,500-acre (1,000 ha) ranch. The house was moved in 1978.
