= 1906 Nevada gubernatorial election =

- November 6, 1906
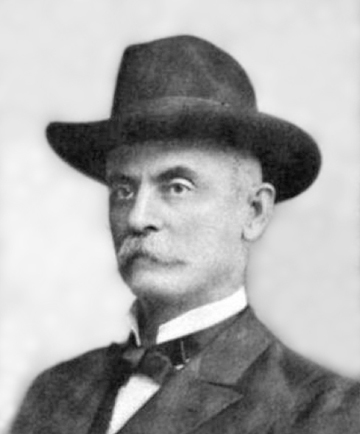

Nominee	John Sparks	Jason F. Mitchell	Thomas B. Casey
Party	Silver	Republican	Socialist
Popular vote	8,686	5,336	815
Percentage	58.54%	35.96%	5.49%
- County results Sparks: 50–60% 60–70% Mitchell: 40–50% 50–60%
Governor before election
John Sparks
Silver
Elected Governor
John Sparks
Silver

The 1906 Nevada gubernatorial election was held on November 6, 1906. Incumbent Silver John Sparks defeated Republican nominee Jason F. Mitchell with 58.54% of the vote.

== General election ==
=== Candidates ===
Major party candidates

- John Sparks, Silver & Democratic
- Jason F. Mitchell, Republican

Other candidates

- Thomas B. Casey, Socialist

=== Results ===
1906 Nevada gubernatorial election
Party	Candidate	Votes	%	±%
Silver	John Sparks (incumbent)	8,686	58.54%	+0.76%
Republican	Jason F. Mitchell	5,336	35.96%	−6.25%
Socialist	Thomas B. Casey	815	5.49%	+5.49%
Majority		3,350	22.58%	
Total votes		14,837	100.00%	
Silver hold		Swing	+7.01%	

=== Results by county ===
County	John Sparks Silver & Democratic		Jason F. Mitchell Republican		Thomas B. Casey Socialist		Margin		Total votes cast
County	#	%	#	%	#	%	#	%	Total votes cast
Churchill	399	64.04%	192	30.82%	32	5.14%	207	33.23%	623
Douglas	177	43.38%	227	55.64%	4	0.98%	-50	-12.25%	408
Elko	659	57.50%	453	39.53%	34	2.97%	206	17.98%	1,146
Esmeralda	1,361	61.70%	641	29.06%	204	9.25%	720	32.64%	2,206
Eureka	219	51.05%	201	46.85%	9	2.10%	18	4.20%	429
Humboldt	509	55.69%	347	37.96%	58	6.35%	162	17.72%	914
Lander	261	61.85%	145	34.36%	16	3.79%	116	27.49%	422
Lincoln	569	57.59%	360	36.44%	59	5.97%	209	21.15%	988
Lyon	339	58.65%	220	38.06%	19	3.29%	119	20.59%	578
Nye	1,686	68.09%	597	24.11%	193	7.79%	1,089	43.98%	2,476
Ormsby	324	47.79%	338	49.85%	16	2.36%	-14	-2.06%	678
Storey	460	53.49%	375	43.60%	25	2.91%	85	9.88%	860
Washoe	1,383	56.36%	948	38.63%	123	5.01%	435	17.73%	2,454
White Pine	340	51.91%	292	44.58%	23	3.51%	48	7.33%	655
Totals	8,686	58.54%	5,336	35.96%	815	5.49%	3,350	22.58%	14,837

==== Counties that flipped from Republican to Silver ====
- Lincoln
- White Pine

==== Counties that flipped from Silver to Republican ====
- Ormsby
