= James R. Judge =

American politician from Nevada (1849–1912)

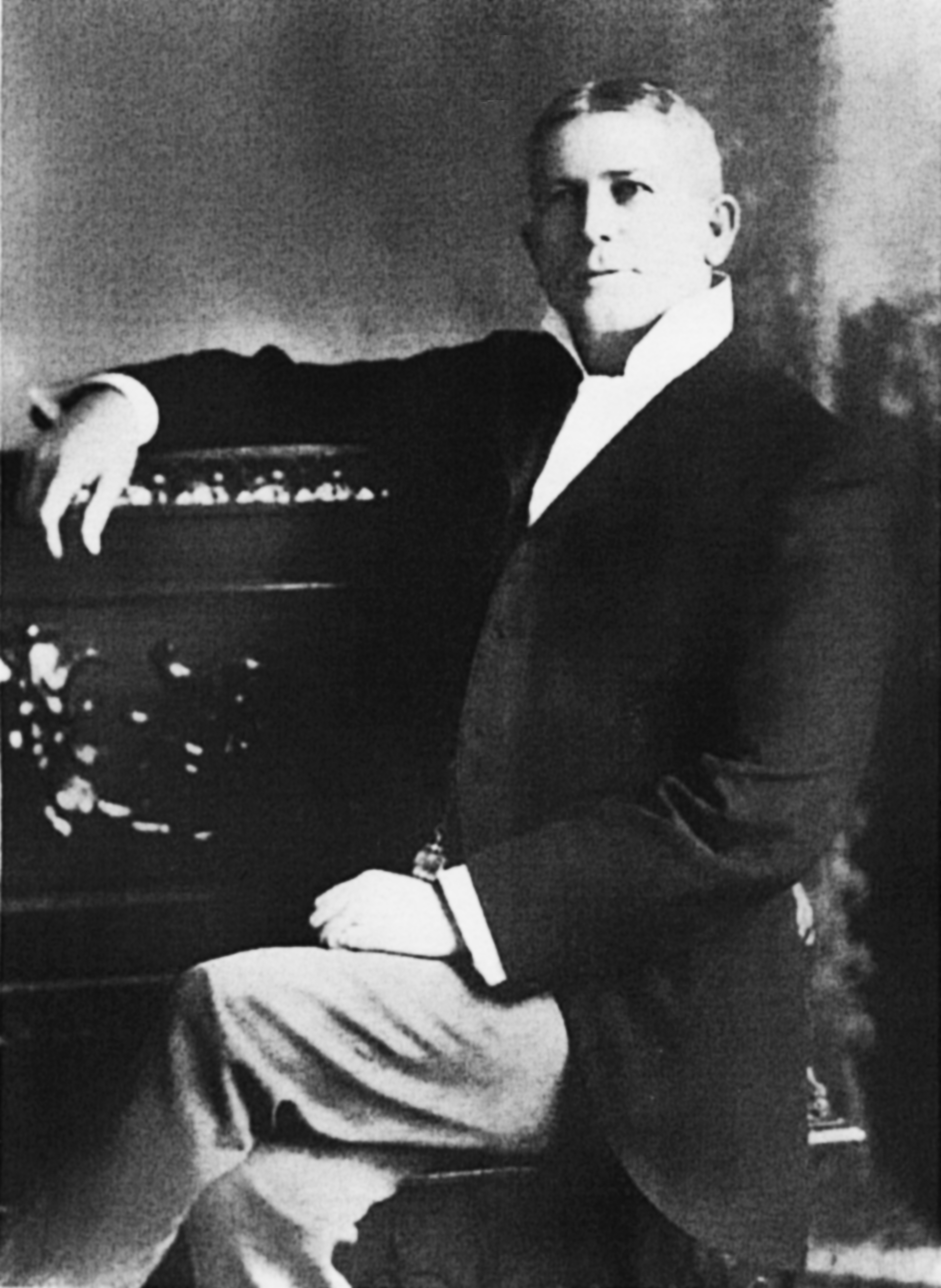

11th Lieutenant Governor of Nevada
- In office January 2, 1899 – January 5, 1903
- Governor: Reinhold Sadler
- Preceded by: Reinhold Sadler
- Succeeded by: Lemuel Allen

10th Attorney General of Nevada
- In office December 21, 1896 – January 2, 1899
- Governor: Reinhold Sadler
- Preceded by: Robert M. Beatty
- Succeeded by: William D. Jones

Personal details
- Born: September 9, 1849 Altoona, Pennsylvania, U.S.
- Died: July 31, 1912 (aged 62) Carson City, Nevada, U.S.
- Party: Silver

James R. Judge (September 9, 1849 – July 31, 1912) was an American politician who served as the 11th lieutenant governor of Nevada and 10th Attorney General of Nevada as a member of the Silver Party between 1896 and 1903.

== Early life ==
Judge was born in Altoona, Pennsylvania on September 9, 1849. He was the son of Irish immigrants and graduated from St. Francis College as a civil engineer. He would execute this job for several years, until he moved to Nevada in 1877, where he initially worked as a surveyor for the railroad. Judge went on to study law and was admitted to the bar in 1881, after which he began practicing law. Judge also went on to invest in various businesses including in mining, which ended up making him a wealthy man.

== Political career ==
Initially a Democrat, Judge was involved in the founding of the Silver Party in 1892, which was primarily active in the state of Nevada. Following the death of incumbent Attorney General of Nevada Robert M. Beatty on December 10, 1896, Judge was appointed by governor Reinhold Sadler to fill the vacancy on December 21, 1896.

Judge ran for lieutenant governor in the 1898 election as the Silver Party nominee and went on to win the election in a four person race with 37.87% of the vote on November 8, 1898. Judge was sworn into office on January 2, 1899, at the same time as his term as Attorney General expired. Judge served as lieutenant governor for a single term, after which he retired from politics and returned to practicing law and his business activities.

== Death ==
In 1912, Judge began to suffer from liver complaints and spent some time in Santa Cruz, California to recover. After having initially seemed to have recovered from his illness, Judge returned to Nevada and resumed his work as an attorney. Judge however suffered a relapse of his liver complaints and was confined to his home for several weeks. Judge failed to recover a second time from his liver ailment and died on July 31, 1912, at his home in Carson City, Nevada.

== See also ==
- List of lieutenant governors of Nevada

Political offices
Preceded by Reinhold Sadler	Lieutenant Governor of Nevada; 1899-1903	Succeeded by Lemuel Allen
