= Thomas V. Julien =

American judge (1838–1906)

Thomas Van Camp Julien

Justice of the Supreme Court of Nevada
- In office 1902–1903
- Preceded by: William A. Massey
- Succeeded by: George Frederick Talbot

Personal details
- Born: November 11, 1838 Ohio
- Died: July 3, 1906 (aged 67)
- Spouse: Martha Alice Brewer (m. 1875; died 1903)
- Children: 3 sons, 3 daughters
- Occupation: Lawyer, Judge, Politician

Thomas Van Camp Julien (November 11, 1838 – July 3, 1906) was a Nevada lawyer and politician who served as a justice of the Supreme Court of Nevada from 1902 to 1903.

== Career ==
Born in Ohio, Julien moved west and served in the Nevada Assembly in 1866 and 1867, representing Humboldt County, Nevada, and serving as Speaker Pro Tempore in 1867. Julien ran unsuccessfully for a district court seat in 1898.

On September 15, 1902, after William A. Massey resigned from the state supreme court to accept appointment to the United States Senate, Julien was appointed to succeed Massey, but "served the shortest term of any justice: just three months".

== Personal life and death ==
On November 9, 1975, Julien married Martha Alice Brewer in Washington, D.C., with whom he had four sons (one of whom died in infancy) and three daughters. Martha died in June 1903, and Julien himself died in 1906, at the age of 67.

Political offices
Preceded by William A. Massey	Justice of the Supreme Court of Nevada; 1902–1903	Succeeded by George Frederick Talbot
