= John Edward Jones (American politician) =

American politician

John E. Jones
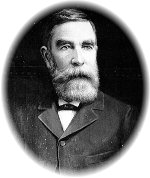

8th Governor of Nevada
- In office January 7, 1895 – April 10, 1896
- Lieutenant: Reinhold Sadler
- Preceded by: Roswell K. Colcord
- Succeeded by: Reinhold Sadler

Personal details
- Born: John Edward Jones; December 5, 1840 Merthyr Tydfil, Wales
- Died: April 10, 1896 (aged 55) San Francisco, California U.S.
- Resting place: Lone Mountain Cemetery, Carson City
- Party: Silver
- Spouse: Elizabeth Weyburn (m. 1880)
- Children: 2

John Edward Jones (December 5, 1840 – April 10, 1896) was an American politician who was the eighth governor of Nevada. He was a member of the Silver Party.

He was born in Merthyr Tydfil, Wales, and his family moved to Iowa in 1856. His early education was in the common schools of his native Wales. He graduated from the Iowa State University in 1865. He married Elizabeth Weyburn on November 25, 1880, and they had two children, Edith and Arvin.

== Career ==
As a young man, Jones worked as a miner, a farmer, and a teacher. In 1867, he worked on building the Union Pacific Railroad. Settling in Eureka, Nevada in 1869, he was involved in organizing the Nevada Militia in 1876 where he served as Major.

Jones worked mining and agriculture until 1883, when he was appointed Deputy Internal Revenue Collector. From 1886 to 1894, he was Surveyor-General of Nevada, serving two terms.

Jones resigned that post, in 1894 and ran for Governor of Nevada on the Silver Party ticket. He won the election and took office in 1895. During his tenure, irrigation programs were supported and the state's first public library was established in Reno, Nevada. Diagnosed with cancer in the fall of 1895, he took a leave of absence, leaving Lieutenant Governor Reinhold Sadler in his office. He traveled to San Francisco, California to try to heal.

== Death ==
Jones, losing his battle with cancer, died while still holding office on April 10, 1896, in San Francisco at the age of 55. He is interred at Lone Mountain Cemetery, Carson City, Nevada.

Party political offices
First	Silver nominee for Governor of Nevada; 1894	Succeeded by Reinhold Sadler
Political offices
Preceded by Roswell K. Colcord	Governor of Nevada; 1895 – 1896	Succeeded by Reinhold Sadler
