= George S. Nixon =

American politician (1860–1912)

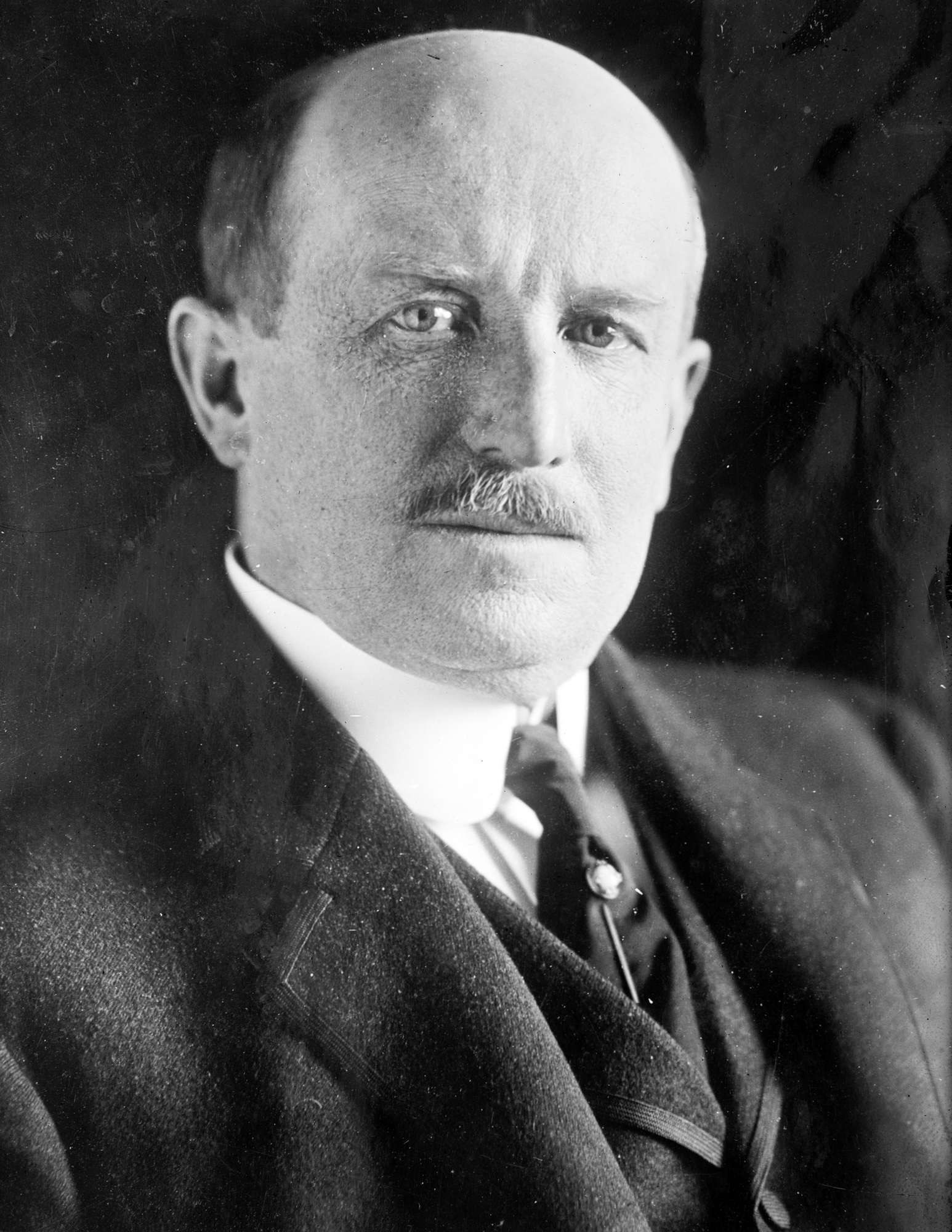

United States Senator from Nevada
- In office March 4, 1905 – June 5, 1912
- Preceded by: William M. Stewart
- Succeeded by: William A. Massey

Member of the Nevada State Assembly
- In office 1891

Personal details
- Born: April 2, 1860 Newcastle, California, U.S.
- Died: June 5, 1912 (aged 52) Washington, D.C., U.S.
- Party: Republican
- Profession: Banker, politician

George Stuart Nixon (April 2, 1860 – June 5, 1912) was an American entrepreneur and politician who served as a member of the United States Senate from Nevada.

== Early life ==
He was born in Newcastle, California. He went to work for a railroad company and studied telegraphy.

== Career ==
In 1881, Nixon was transferred to Nevada, where he organized and became cashier of a bank at Winnemucca. He also built an opera house in Reno, a theater in Winnemucca and was one of the financiers of the Mizpah Hotel in Tonopah, Nevada.

He became a member of the Nevada Assembly in 1891 and was elected to the U.S. Senate in 1905 as a Republican. He was re-elected in 1911 and served until his death in 1912. He was the chairman of the Committee on Coast Defenses.

On February 9, 1905, he joined the San Francisco Bohemian Club.

== Death ==
Nixon died in 1912 and was buried in the Masonic Cemetery in Reno. The Nevada Legislature chose William A. Massey as his successor. The town of Nixon, Nevada was named after George Nixon.

== See also ==
- List of members of the United States Congress who died in office (1900–1949)

Party political offices
First	Republican nominee for U.S. Senator from Nevada (Class 1); 1911	Succeeded by William A. Massey
U.S. Senate
Preceded by William M. Stewart	U.S. senator (Class 1) from Nevada; 1905–1912; Served alongside: Francis G. Newlands	Succeeded by William A. Massey
