= 1861 California gubernatorial election =

- September 4, 1861
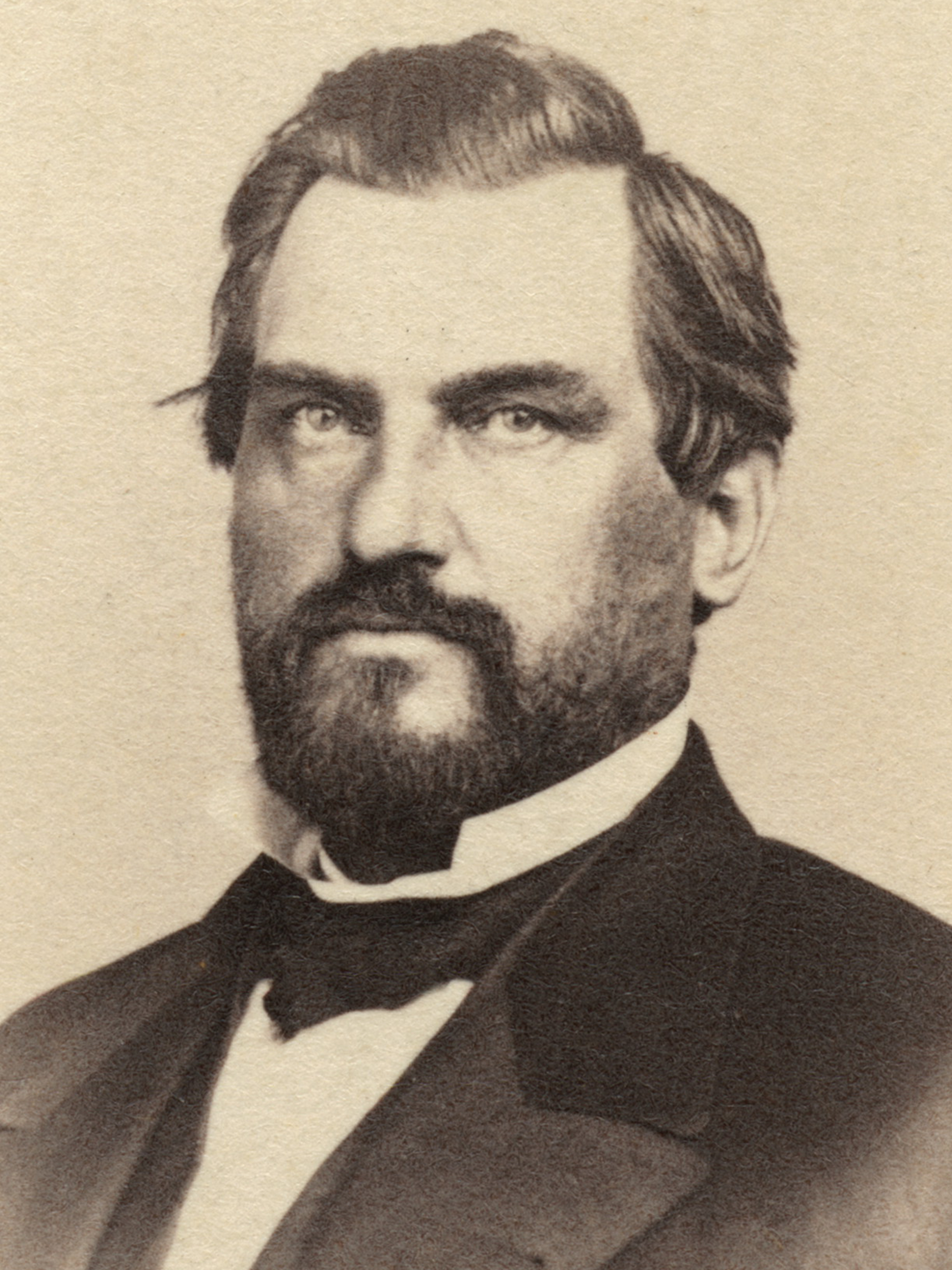

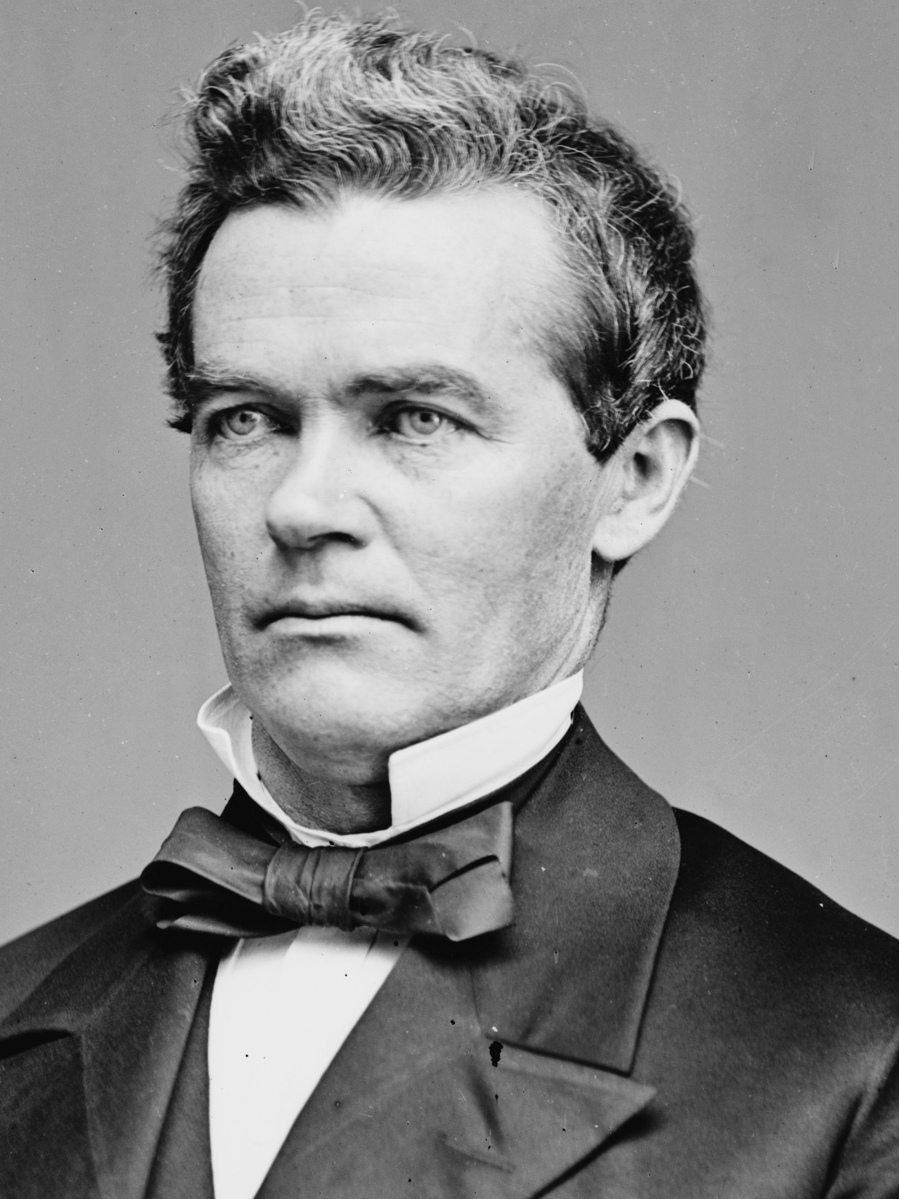
Nominee	Leland Stanford	John R. McConnell	John Conness
Party	Republican	Chivalry Democratic	Union Democratic
Popular vote	56,036	33,751	30,944
Percentage	46.41%	27.96%	25.63%
- County results Stanford: 30–40% 40–50% 50–60% 60–70% 70–80% McConnell: 30–40% 40–50% 50–60% 60–70% 70–80% Conness: 40–50% 70–80%
Governor of California before election
John G. Downey
Democratic
Governor of California
Leland Stanford
Republican

The 1861 California gubernatorial election took place on September 4, 1861. Incumbent Governor John G. Downey was not a candidate for renomination, as his Democratic Party had violently ruptured over the issue of slavery and secession. Downey was a Lecompton Democrat, those who favored slavery in the Kansas Territory and who were running as now as the Breckenridge or "Chivalry" Democrats. These Chivalry Democrats supported Attorney General John McConnell. Anti-slavery or anti-secession Democrats were the "Unionist" Democrats who favored John Conness.

With the dire split in the Democratic Party, even more bitter than in 1859, former Republican nominee Leland Stanford won a plurality of the popular vote and became the first Republican governor of California. Both Stanford and Conness later served in the United States Senate.

== Results ==
California gubernatorial election, 1861
Party	Candidate	Votes	%	±%
Republican	Leland Stanford	56,036	46.80%	+37.06%
Southern Democratic	John McConnell	32,751	27.35%	−31.77%
Union Democratic	John Conness	30,944	25.84%	−5.28%
Majority		23,285	19.45%	
Total votes		119,731	100.00%	
Republican gain from Democratic		Swing	+68.83%	

=== Results by county ===
County	Leland Stanford Republican		John R. McConnell Southern Democratic		John Conness Democratic		Margin		Total votes cast
County	#	%	#	%	#	%	#	%	Total votes cast
Alameda	1,932	69.02%	356	12.72%	511	18.26%	1,421 (Note: Margin over Conness)	50.77%	2,799
Amador	1,299	38.39%	827	24.44%	1,258	37.17%	41	1.21%	3,384
Butte	1,732	42.53%	1,106	27.16%	1,234	30.30%	498	12.23%	4,072
Calaveras	1,980	38.39%	1,572	30.48%	1,606	31.14%	374	7.25%	5,158
Colusa	348	30.88%	581	51.55%	198	17.57%	-233	-20.67%	1,127
Contra Costa	959	60.50%	330	20.82%	296	18.68%	629	39.68%	1,585
Del Norte	172	38.31%	213	47.44%	64	14.25%	-41	-9.13%	449
El Dorado	2,775	43.72%	1,370	21.59%	2,202	34.69%	573	9.03%	6,347
Fresno	54	12.05%	316	70.54%	78	17.41%	-238	-53.13%	448
Humboldt	402	41.57%	205	21.20%	360	37.23%	42	4.34%	967
Klamath	198	26.98%	301	41.01%	235	32.02%	-66	-8.99%	734
Lake	92	29.39%	167	53.35%	54	17.25%	-75	-23.96%	313
Los Angeles	455	24.62%	1,195	64.66%	198	10.71%	-740	-40.04%	1,848
Marin	591	53.48%	309	27.96%	205	18.55%	282	25.52%	1,105
Mariposa	566	30.38%	710	38.11%	587	31.51%	-123	-6.60%	1,863
Mendocino	493	37.21%	559	42.19%	273	20.60%	-66	-4.98%	1,325
Merced	59	12.97%	309	67.91%	87	19.12%	-222	-48.79%	455
Mono	350	25.07%	528	37.82%	518	37.11%	-10	-0.71%	1,396
Monterey	499	48.03%	235	22.62%	305	29.36%	194	18.67%	1,039
Napa	767	48.03%	553	34.63%	277	17.35%	214	13.40%	1,597
Nevada	3,250	49.62%	1,779	27.16%	1,521	23.22%	1,471	22.46%	6,550
Placer	2,222	48.54%	893	19.51%	1,463	31.96%	759	16.58%	4,578
Plumas	659	37.06%	517	29.08%	602	33.86%	57	3.21%	1,778
Sacramento	3,264	45.16%	1.127	15.59%	2,836	39.24%	428	5.92%	7,227
San Bernardino	297	30.97%	401	41.81%	261	27.22%	-104	-10.84%	959
San Diego	122	46.21%	90	34.09%	52	19.70%	32	12.12%	264
San Francisco	10,728	70.82%	1,243	8.21%	3,178	20.98%	7,550	49.84%	15,149
San Joaquin	1,837	47.85%	1,588	41.36%	414	10.78%	249	6.49%	3,839
San Luis Obispo	176	36.82%	200	41.84%	102	21.34%	-24	-5.02%	478
San Mateo	702	59.24%	100	8.44%	383	32.32%	319	26.92%	1,185
Santa Barbara	131	22.17%	24	4.06%	436	73.77%	-305	-51.61%	591
Santa Clara	1,995	57.88%	1,081	31.36%	371	10.76%	914	26.52%	3,447
Santa Cruz	916	62.48%	367	25.03%	183	12.48%	549	37.45%	1,466
Shasta	626	26.87%	628	26.95%	1,076	46.18%	-448 (Note: Margin over McConnell)	-19.23%	2,330
Sierra	2,147	45.01%	1,423	29.83%	1,200	25.16%	724	15.18%	4,770
Siskiyou	1,168	36.90%	717	22.65%	1,280	40.44%	-112	-3.54%	3,165
Solano	1,449	55.86%	689	26.56%	456	17.58%	760	29.30%	2,594
Sonoma	1,608	44.63%	1,616	44.85%	379	10.52%	-8	-0.22%	3,603
Stanislaus	247	27.66%	415	46.47%	231	25.87%	-168	-18.81%	893
Sutter	558	39.32%	570	40.17%	291	20.51%	-12	-0.85%	1,419
Tehama	405	31.64%	507	39.61%	368	28.75%	-102	-7.97%	1,280
Trinity	888	39.07%	608	26.75%	777	34.18%	111	4.88%	2,273
Tulare	153	13.19%	671	57.84%	336	28.97%	-335	-28.88%	1,160
Tuolumne	2,025	43.67%	1,636	35.28%	976	21.05%	389	8.39%	4,637
Yolo	726	40.63%	694	38.84%	367	20.54%	32	1.79%	1,787
Yuba	2,014	46.86%	1,425	33.15%	859	19.99%	589	13.70%	4,298
Total	56,036	46.80%	32,751	27.35%	30,994	25.84%	23,285	19.45%	119,731

==== Counties that flipped from Democratic to Republican ====
- Alameda
- Amador
- Butte
- Calaveras
- Contra Costa
- El Dorado
- Humboldt
- Marin
- Monterey
- Napa
- Nevada
- Placer
- Plumas
- Sacramento
- San Diego
- San Francisco
- San Joaquin
- San Mateo
- Santa Clara
- Santa Cruz
- Sierra
- Solano
- Trinity
- Tuolumne
- Yolo
- Yuba
