= George Frederick Talbot =

American judge (1859–1938)

Justice of the Supreme Court of Nevada
- In office 1903–1915
- Preceded by: Thomas V. Julien
- Succeeded by: Benjamin Wilson Coleman

Personal details
- Born: April 16, 1859; Ledyard, Connecticut
- Died: January 16, 1938 (aged 78); Los Angeles, California
- Parent(s): Henry Monroe Talbot, Myra Ann Ayer
- Occupation: Lawyer, Judge

George Frederick Talbot (April 16, 1859 – January 16, 1938) was a justice of the Supreme Court of Nevada from 1903 to 1915.

== Early life, education, and career ==
Born at Ledyard, Connecticut, Talbot came from Colonial and Revolutionary ancestry of English, Scotch and Irish descent. His father was Henry Monroe Talbot, and his mother was Myra Ann Ayer, daughter of Colonel George Ayer.

As a child, he was brought by his mother to California, by way of Panama, his father having previously moved there. He was educated in the common schools of California in 1868, and at the age of nine, he went with his father and others by wagons from California to Elko County, Nevada. He attended a log school house in Nevada in 1869, 1870 and 1871, and in Connecticut from 1872 to 1875. At the age of sixteen, he "went into the world for himself", working on farms in Connecticut and Nevada to earn money with which to complete his education. From 1875 until 1879 he pursued special courses of study in higher mathematics, physics, Latin, political economy and science of government at Dickinson Seminary, Williamsport, Pennsylvania. Later he read Blackstone's and Kent's Commentaries by himself and pursued his legal studies at Elko, Nevada, with Hon. Rensselaer R. Bigelow, who was later Chief Justice of the Supreme Court of Nevada.

== Legal career ==
Talbot entered the practice of law in 1881, and "was successful from the beginning and soon had a large clientele". He was elected District Attorney of Elko County in 1884 and re-elected in 1886, declining to run again in 1888. In 1890 he was elected by the state at large as one of the four District Judges. Division into districts having been made, in 1894 he was elected Judge of the Fourth Judicial District, comprising the eastern tier of counties, and re-elected without opposition in 1898. He was elected Justice of the Supreme Court of Nevada in 1902 for a term of six years, and re-elected in 1908. Under the Constitution, by reason of being the senior Justice in commission, he was chief justice from 1907 to 1908, and again from 1913 to 1914.

Notable among his opinions, sustained by the Supreme Court of the United States, is the one in the Boyce case, upholding an act of the Legislature providing for an eight-hour day for men laboring in mines, smelters and ore-reduction works. In Nash v. McNamara, involving the construction of Federal statutes relating to the right of re-location of mineral lands upon the public domain, he declined to follow the rule laid down by the U.S. Supreme Court of the United States in the 1905 case of Lavagnino v. Uhlig; the U.S. Supreme Court, in the 1908 case of Farrell v. Lockhart, modified its views to conform with the reasoning provided by Talbot in Nash.

== Later life and death ==
Following his court service, Talbot served as a master in chancery presiding over a Truckee River water rights dispute, and as president of the Nevada Historical Society, and as a member of the Board of Regents of the University of Nevada.

Talbot died in a hospital in Los Angeles at the age of 79, from injuries caused by a fall in the street.

Political offices
Preceded by Thomas V. Julien	Justice of the Supreme Court of Nevada; 1903–1915	Succeeded by Benjamin Wilson Coleman
