= 1898 Nevada gubernatorial election =

- November 8, 1898
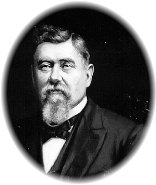

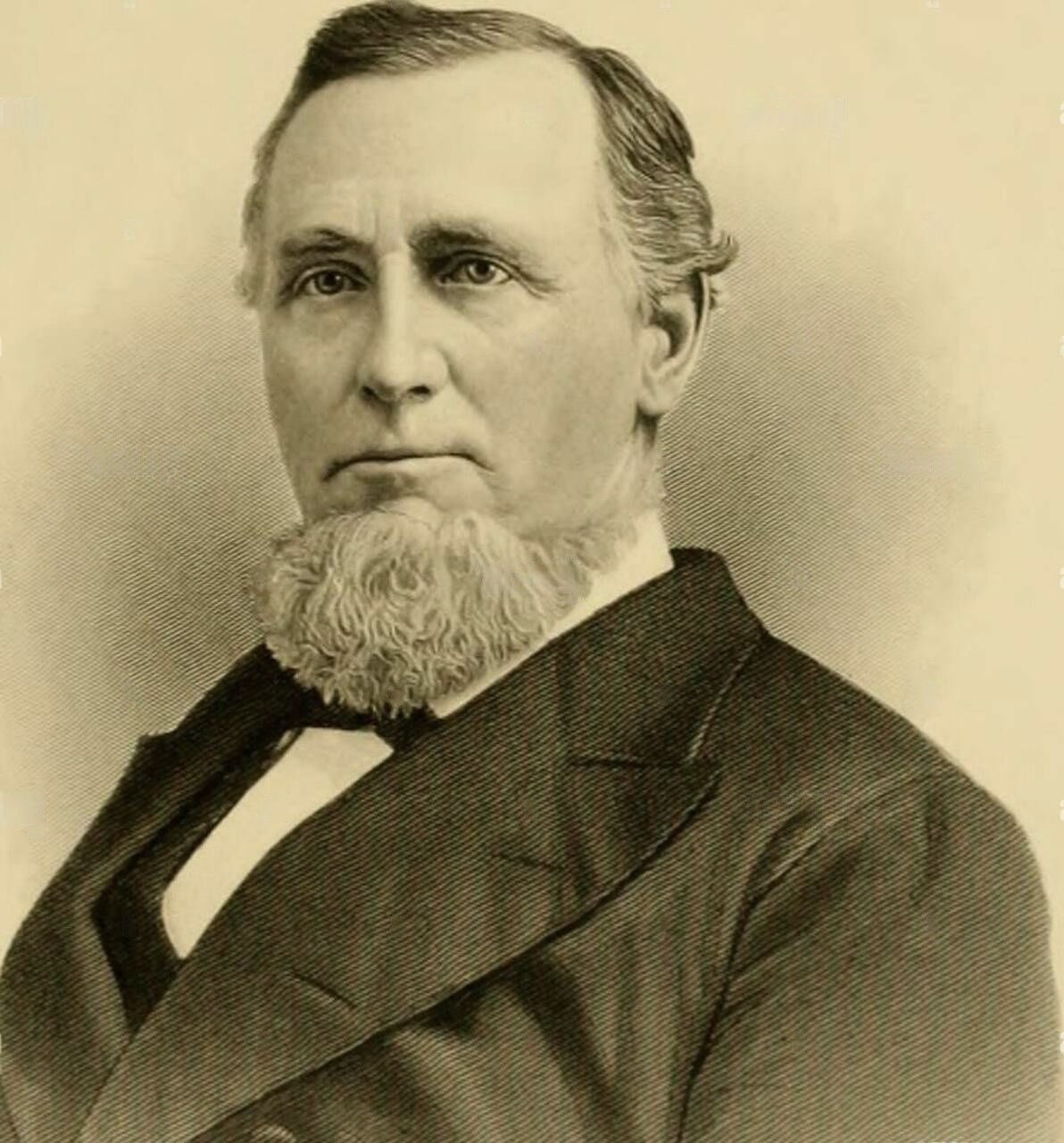

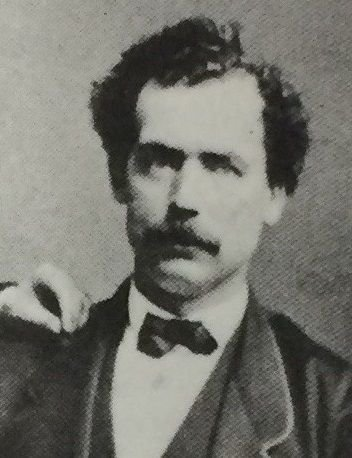

Nominee	Reinhold Sadler	William McMillan
Party	Silver	Republican
Popular vote	3,570	3,548
Percentage	35.67%	35.45%
Nominee	George Russell	J. B. McCullough
Party	Democratic	Populist
Popular vote	2,057	833
Percentage	20.55%	8.32%
- County results Sadler: 30–40% 40–50% 50–60% 60–70% McMillan: 40–50% 50–60% Russell: 40–50%
Governor before election
Reinhold Sadler (acting)
Silver
Elected Governor
Reinhold Sadler
Silver

The 1898 Nevada gubernatorial election was held on November 8, 1898.

Incumbent Silver Party Governor Reinhold Sadler defeated Republican nominee William McMillan, Democratic nominee George Russell, and Populist nominee J. B. McCullough with 35.67% of the vote.

== General election ==
=== Candidates ===
- J. B. McCullough, Populist, businessman
- William McMillan, Republican, merchant, Republican candidate for U.S. Senate in 1897
- George Russell, Democratic, merchant
- Reinhold Sadler, Silver, incumbent Governor

=== Results ===
1898 Nevada gubernatorial election
Party	Candidate	Votes	%	±%
Silver	Reinhold Sadler (incumbent)	3,570	35.67%	−14.20%
Republican	William McMillan	3,548	35.45%	−1.41%
Democratic	George Russell	2,057	20.55%	+14.08%
Populist	J. B. McCullough	833	8.32%	+1.53%
Plurality		22	0.22%	
Total votes		10,008	100.00%	
Silver hold		Swing	-12.78%	

=== Results by county ===
County	Reinhold Sadler Silver		William McMillan Republican		George Russell Democratic		J. B. McCullough Populist		Margin		Total votes cast
County	#	%	#	%	#	%	#	%	#	%	Total votes cast
Churchill	38	19.69%	95	49.22%	53	27.46%	7	3.63%	-42 (Note: McMillan over Russell)	-21.76%	193
Douglas	142	32.95%	209	48.49%	60	13.92%	20	4.64%	-67	-15.55%	431
Elko	499	38.21%	324	24.81%	418	32.01%	65	4.98%	81 (Note: Margin over Russell)	6.20%	1,306
Esmeralda	191	43.91%	158	36.32%	65	14.94%	21	4.83%	33	7.59%	435
Eureka	336	59.47%	134	23.72%	75	13.27%	20	3.54%	202	35.75%	565
Humboldt	349	36.66%	284	29.83%	272	28.57%	47	4.94%	65	6.83%	952
Lander	199	41.37%	85	17.67%	182	37.84%	15	3.12%	17 (Note: Margin over Russell)	3.53%	481
Lincoln	259	36.84%	111	15.79%	297	42.25%	36	5.12%	-38	-5.41%	703
Lyon	199	32.57%	301	49.26%	93	15.22%	18	2.95%	-102	-16.69%	611
Nye	147	63.09%	31	13.30%	40	17.17%	15	6.44%	107 (Note: Margin over Russell)	45.92%	233
Ormsby	395	46.91%	370	43.94%	61	7.24%	16	1.90%	25	2.97%	842
Storey	346	30.92%	596	53.26%	148	13.23%	29	2.59%	-250	-22.34%	1,119
Washoe	286	16.93%	705	41.74%	191	11.31%	507	30.02%	-198 (Note: Margin over McCullough)	-11.72%	1,689
White Pine	184	41.07%	145	32.37%	102	22.77%	17	3.79%	39	8.71%	448
Totals	3,570	35.67%	3,548	35.45%	2,057	20.55%	833	8.32%	22	0.22%	10,008

==== Counties that flipped from Republican to Silver ====
- Ormsby
- White Pine

==== Counties that flipped from Silver to Republican ====
- Churchill
- Lyon

==== Counties that flipped from Silver to Democratic ====
- Lincoln
