= William M. Stewart =

American politician (1827–1909)

- Portrait by C. M. Bell c. 1905

United States Senator from Nevada
- In office March 4, 1887 – March 3, 1905
- Preceded by: James G. Fair
- Succeeded by: George S. Nixon
- In office February 1, 1865 – March 3, 1875
- Preceded by: Seat established
- Succeeded by: William Sharon

5th Attorney General of California
- Acting; June 7, 1854 – December 1854
- Governor: John Bigler
- Preceded by: John R. McConnell
- Succeeded by: John R. McConnell

Personal details
- Born: August 9, 1827 Galen, New York, US
- Died: April 23, 1909 (aged 81) Washington, D.C., US
- Party: Whig (before 1852); Democratic (1852–1864); Republican (1864–1893); Silver (1893–1901)
- Profession: Attorney

William Morris Stewart (August 9, 1827 – April 23, 1909) was an American attorney and politician who served as the 5th attorney general of California from June to December 1854 and as United States senator from Nevada from 1865 to 1875 and again from 1887 to 1905. In 1964, he was inducted into the Hall of Great Westerners of the National Cowboy & Western Heritage Museum.

== Early life ==
Stewart was born in Wayne County, New York, on August 9, 1825. As a child he moved with his parents to Trumbull County, Ohio. As a young man he was a mathematics teacher in Ohio. In 1849 he began attending Yale University in New Haven, Connecticut, but left in 1850 to move to the Far West to California. during the famous California Gold Rush of 1848–1852. He arrived in San Francisco, California, and soon left to begin prospect mining near Nevada City, California.

=== Marriages ===
Stewart was married to Annie Elizabeth Foote, daughter of his law partner, Henry S. Foote, on May 31, 1855.

His second wife was May Agnes Cone, widow of Theodore C. Cone. They were wed on October 26, 1903, in the Piedmont Hotel, Atlanta, Georgia. Judge Thomas M. Norwood, who had served with Stewart in the U.S. Senate was the best man.

According to the book Reminiscences of William M. Stewart (published 1908), in May 1905 he moved with his new wife and her daughter to the Bullfrog Mining District (Nevada), of Bullfrog, Nevada where he started a law firm and law library.

== Political career ==
=== California ===
Reminiscences of Senator William M. Stewart of Nevada edited by George Rothwell Brown, published 1908

In 1849, Stewart ran for governor in California's first gubernatorial election, but placed 5th with 4.36% of the vote and lost to Peter Hardeman Burnett. Later, in 1851, he ran for sheriff of Nevada County, California, and the next year, in February, he was at the Whig State Convention in Sacramento, where he was named a delegate to the party's national convention.

In 1852, he studied law in the office of Nevada County District Attorney John R. McConnell, becoming a Democrat in the process. He was appointed to succeed McConnell as district attorney in November 1852. At that time he became a "motivating force" in beginning a Democratic newspaper, Young America (later called The Nevada Democrat). Stewart continued as District Attorney after an election in November 1853.

Stewart was acting Attorney General of California from June 7, 1854, until December.

Stewart later moved to San Francisco and became a law partner with Henry S. Foote, Louis Aldrick, and Benjamin Watkins Lee.

=== Nevada ===
==== State ====
In 1860 Stewart moved to Virginia City, Nevada, where he participated in mining litigation and helped the development of the Comstock Lode. As Nevada was becoming a state in 1864, he helped the state develop its constitution. Stewart's role as a lawyer and politician in Nevada has always been controversial. He was the territory's leading lawyer in mining litigation, but his opponents accused him of bribing judges and juries. Stewart accused the three Nevada territorial judges of being corrupt, and he barely escaped disbarment.

==== United States Senate ====
Portrait by Brady c. 1865–1875

In 1864, Stewart was named by the Nevada State Legislature to the United States Senate as a Republican. He served in the U.S. Senate for a decade from 1865 until 1875, when he retired and moved back west to practice law again in Nevada and California. In 1873, Stewart's palatial residence, nicknamed Stewart's Castle, was built in the federal. national capital city of Washington, D.C., and became a center of the city's social scene. He was elected to the Senate again by the Nevada Legislature in 1887 and reelected by them in 1893 and subsequently once more in 1899. During the 1890s however, he left the then post-war dominant Republican Party to join the small independent minority third party of the short-lived Silver Party (1892–1911), which was supported by many Westerners who were in favor of the Free Silver movement, a major political and economic issue in the United States during the late 19th century and generally also favored by the then minority opposition Democratic Party, led by three-time presidential candidate, William Jennings Bryan (1860–1925), of Nebraska. During this time, Senator Stewart caucused / voted with the liberal Silver Republicans. faction of the Republican Senators rather than the opposing minority Democratic Senators (who were honestly strong in their support of "free silver").

"A Senatorial Desperado," a political cartoon by Louis Dalrymple published in Puck depicting Stewart strangling Uncle Sam, October 4, 1893

During his many years in the Senate, Stewart drafted or co-authored several important bills of legislation, including several mining acts and laws urging land reclamation by more irrigation. Most famously, Senator Stewart is given credit for authoring in 1868 the Fifteenth Amendment to the United States Constitution protecting voting rights regardless of race, color, or previous condition of servitude, the last of the noted three post-Civil War constitutional amendments on the issues of slavery abolition, protection of citizenship rights and allowing voting rights for black / Negro former slaves. During his time as a Senator on Capitol Hill, Stewart received 50,000 acres of land on the side for his service on the Committee on Pacific Railroads, a benefit from lobbyists and company managers / directors of several of the transcontinental railroads then being extended across the West to the Pacific Ocean coast, . In 1871, 18th President Ulysses S. Grant (1822–1885, served 1869–1877), offered Stewart a seat as an associate justice on the United States Supreme Court. Stewart however declined. Stewart was also involved in an international scandal where he promoted the sale of a worthless worked out pit of the Emma Silver Mine at Alta, Utah for millions of pounds sterling to unsuspecting British subjects (citizen) overseas in the United Kingdom (Great Britain / England) in Europe.

In 1899, Republican-affiliated journalist and diplomat William Eleroy Curtis (1850–1911), detailed Stewart's reputation amongst his colleagues, describing as follows:

"There was an air of gloom about the Senate all to-day, as if some calamity were impending or some great sorrow had fallen upon the members. It was the result of the news from Nevada — the re-election of Senator Stewart and the prospect of being compelled to listen to his speeches for another Six years. Mr. Stewart is an interminable talker, but his colleagues could endure that if he would talk on more than one subject, which he declines to do. He makes the same speech over and over again almost every day, so that Senators with good memories can repeat it almost verbatim, and his familiar phrases about the capitalistic vampires with the fetid fangs and the money devils and the crime of 1873 are more familiar to a majority of the Senate than the Ten Commandments…" "Ex-Senator William W. Evarts (1818-1901l, from New York, hit off on Mr. Stewart's peculiarities in a little story that he told at a dinner given in honor of colleague, Senator John Coit Spooner, when the latter was leaving public life six years ago… Senator Evarts, who next took to the floor of the Senate chamber at the U.S. Capitol, said that Stewart reminded him of a man he had met at an insane asylum one time when he was acting as a member of a board of visitors. The Superintendent told them that they must say cheerful things to the patients, and therefore when he saw a lunatic sitting astride of a table beating it with a whip and pretending to drive it with a pair of string lines, he walked up to him and said: 'That’s a fine hobby you have there, my friend.' 'It isn’t a hobby,' answered the lunatic. 'It’s a horse.' 'What’s the difference between a horse and a hobby?', suggested Mr. Evarts. The lunatic turned on him with an air of supreme contempt and remarked: 'You blank fool, anybody can get off a horse, but nobody ever got off a hobby.'"

In 1902, Senator Stewart was in The Hague of the Netherlands in Europe, in connection with the Mexican-American arbitration case, when his wife Annie, the daughter of former Confederate States Senator Henry S. Foote of Mississippi was killed in an early automobile / motor-car accident back in America on the West Coast in Alameda, California.

In 1903 he was reputed to be one of the richest men in the United States Senate (with an estimated fortune of some $25 million and ownership of several gold and silver mines in California and Nevada) and the oldest member at that time of the upper chamber of the Congress.

== Later life and death ==
Stewart retired from the Senate in 1905. He was a co-founder of the city of Chevy Chase, Maryland, along with Francis G. Newlands, a fellow Senator from Nevada. Stewart remained in Washington, D.C., and died there four years later. He was cremated, and his ashes were originally kept in Laurel Hill Cemetery in San Francisco before being moved to Cypress Lawn Memorial Park in Colma, California.

== In popular culture ==
The film / television actor Howard Negley (1898–1983), portrayed Stewart in the March 31, 1953 episode (season 1, episode 15), "The Bandits of Panamint", of the syndicated television anthology series, and Western program Death Valley Days, hosted then by Stanley Andrews (the "Old Colonel"). In the story line, Stewart enters into an agreement to gain pardons for two bandits, played by actors Rick Vallin and Glase Lohman, who accidentally stumble upon a rich silver strike. Stewart, however gains ownership of the mine. Actresses Sheila Ryan and Gloria Winters played young women with romantic interests in the silver miners / outlaws.

In another episode also in 1953, of Death Valley Days, "Whirlwind Courtship", Michael Hathaway, who appeared only twice on television, played Stewart as a young, up and coming Nevada lawyer determined to wed Annie Foote, a real-life daughter of a former U.S. Senator representing Mississippi, and Governor of Mississippi, Henry S. Foote (1804–1880), who himself had relocated to the American western frontier, after his political career during the 1850s in the South and Washington, D.C.

A year later, in a third episode from 1954, of the same Western anthology television series Death Valley Days, entitled "The Light on the Mountain," the role of Stewart was played by actor Michael Colgan (1921–2006). In the story line, characters Stewart and "Richard Corey" (played by Glase Lohman) attempt to clean up the justice system in wild and wooly frontier Nevada in preparation for statehood in 1864. Actress Phyllis Coates played Stewart's now wife, "Annie Foote Stewart" and famous star actress Angie Dickinson (born 1931), was cast as "Sabina Harris", a young woman with a romantic interest in lawyer Stewart's friend Corey.

== See also ==
- List of United States senators who switched parties

U.S. Senate
Preceded by (none)	U.S. senator (Class 1) from Nevada; 1865–1875; Served alongside: James W. Nye, John P. Jones	Succeeded by William Sharon
Preceded by James G. Fair	U.S. senator (Class 1) from Nevada; 1887–1905; Served alongside: John P. Jones, Francis G. Newlands	Succeeded by George S. Nixon
Legal offices
Preceded by John R. McConnell	Attorney General of California; 1854	Succeeded by William T. Wallace
