= 1894 Nevada gubernatorial election =

- November 6, 1894
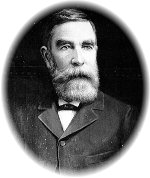

Nominee	John Edward Jones	Abner Coburn Cleveland
Party	Silver	Republican
Popular vote	5,223	3,861
Percentage	49.87%	36.87%
Nominee	George Peckham	Theodore Winters
Party	Populist	Democratic
Popular vote	711	678
Percentage	6.79%	6.47%
- County results Jones: 30–40% 40–50% 50–60% 60–70% 70–80% Cleveland: 40–50% 50–60%
Governor before election
Roswell K. Colcord
Republican
Elected Governor
John Edward Jones
Silver

The 1894 Nevada gubernatorial election was held on November 6, 1894, in the U.S. state of Nevada.

Incumbent Republican Governor Roswell K. Colcord did not stand for re-election.

Silver Party nominee John Edward Jones defeated Republican nominee Abner Coburn Cleveland, Populist nominee George Peckham, and Democratic nominee Theodore Winters with 49.87% of the vote.

== General election ==
=== Candidates ===
- George Peckham, Populist
- Abner Coburn Cleveland, Republican, former State Senator
- Theodore Winters, Democratic, Democratic nominee for Governor in 1890
- John Edward Jones, Silver, Surveyor General of Nevada

=== Results ===
1894 Nevada gubernatorial election
Party	Candidate	Votes	%	±%
Silver	John Edward Jones	5,223	49.87%	+49.87%
Republican	Abner C. Cleveland	3,861	36.87%	−16.40%
Populist	George E. Peckham	711	6.79%	+6.79%
Democratic	Theodore Winters	678	6.47%	−40.26%
Plurality		1,362	13.00%	
Total votes		10,473	100.00%	
Silver gain from Republican		Swing	+6.47%	

=== Results by county ===
County	John Edward Jones Silver		Abner C. Cleveland Republican		George E. Peckham Populist		Theodore Winters Democratic		Margin		Total votes cast
County	#	%	#	%	#	%	#	%	#	%	Total votes cast
Churchill	94	50.81%	70	37.84%	13	7.03%	8	4.32%	24	12.97%	185
Douglas	147	36.66%	233	58.10%	17	4.24%	4	1.00%	-86	-21.45%	401
Elko	765	67.94%	241	21.40%	51	4.53%	69	6.13%	524	46.54%	1,126
Esmeralda	289	65.24%	125	28.22%	6	1.35%	23	5.19%	164	37.02%	443
Eureka	450	73.41%	135	22.02%	20	3.26%	8	1.31%	315	51.39%	613
Humboldt	736	68.79%	210	19.63%	86	8.04%	38	3.55%	526	49.16%	1,070
Lander	219	48.78%	131	28.18%	31	6.90%	68	15.14%	88	19.60%	449
Lincoln	225	39.40%	216	37.83%	107	18.74%	23	4.03%	9	1.58%	571
Lyon	387	58.64%	233	35.30%	23	3.48%	17	2.58%	154	23.33%	660
Nye	160	71.43%	39	17.41%	14	6.25%	11	4.91%	121	54.02%	224
Ormsby	405	46.61%	433	49.83%	8	0.92%	23	2.65%	-28	-3.22%	869
Storey	676	39.91%	744	43.92%	59	3.48%	215	12.69%	-68	-4.01%	1,694
Washoe	499	28.37%	818	46.50%	271	15.41%	171	9.72%	-319	-18.14%	1,759
White Pine	171	41.81%	233	56.97%	5	1.22%	0	0.00%	-62	-15.16%	409
Totals	5,223	49.87%	3,861	36.87%	711	6.79%	678	6.47%	1,362	13.00%	10,473

==== Counties that flipped from Democratic to Silver ====
- Churchill
- Elko
- Humboldt
- Lincoln
- Nye

==== Counties that flipped from Republican to Silver ====
- Esmeralda
- Eureka
- Lander
- Lyon
