= John Sparks (Nevada politician) =

American politician (1843–1908)

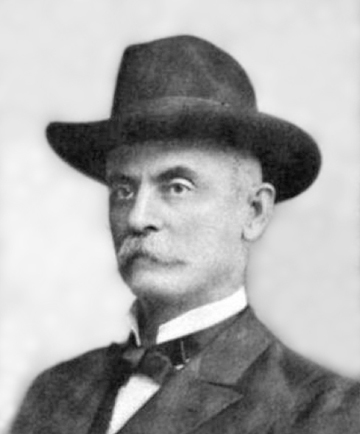

10th Governor of Nevada
- In office January 5, 1903 – May 22, 1908
- Lieutenant: Lemuel Allen; Denver S. Dickerson
- Preceded by: Reinhold Sadler
- Succeeded by: Denver S. Dickerson

Personal details
- Born: August 30, 1843 Louisville, Mississippi, U.S.
- Died: May 22, 1908 (aged 64) Carson City, Nevada, U.S.
- Resting place: Masonic Memorial Gardens; Reno, Nevada, U.S.
- Party: Silver – Democratic
- Spouses: Rachel Knight (m. 1872; died 1879) Nancy Elenora Knight (m. 1880)
- Children: 6

John Sparks (August 30, 1843 – May 22, 1908), nicknamed Honest John, was an American politician who was the tenth governor of Nevada. Like his predecessor, Reinhold Sadler, Sparks was a cattleman and his rise to political power was evidence of the decline of the mining industry and the rise of the ranching industry in Nevada. He was a member of the Silver – Democratic Party. In 1958, he was inducted into the Hall of Great Westerners of the National Cowboy & Western Heritage Museum.

== Early life ==
Sparks was born on August 30, 1843, in Louisville, Mississippi. His family was one of those known as "new lands families", who specialized in developing land on the frontier and then selling out and moving on as settlement in the area increased. His family followed the frontier through Arkansas, moving on to Texas in 1857 by which point they were moderately wealthy. In Texas, they began ranching cattle, and John became a proficient cowboy.

== Cattleman career ==
In 1861, Sparks joined the Texas Rangers, probably to avoid being drafted into the Confederate Army. His unit was tasked with protecting settlers from the Comanche, and he did not fight in the Civil War. After the war, Sparks drove cattle in the huge Longhorn drives of the era, at first working for John Meyers, and later in partnership with his brothers. In 1872, Sparks married Rachel Knight and they had two daughters, Maude and Rachel.

In 1873, Sparks bought a large herd of cattle in Texas then drove them to Wyoming and established a ranch in the Chugwater River valley near Cheyenne. He sold that ranch and its 2,100 head of cattle the next year to the Swan Brothers. After that, Sparks established a series of ranches along the North Platte River, each of which he quickly sold and invested the money in the next ranch. Sparks also invested in a bank in Georgetown, Texas (his wife's hometown), where he also built a mansion. In 1879 his wife died, and in 1880 Sparks married her half-sister Nancy Elnora "Nora" Knight, they had three sons, Benton, Charles and Leland.

By that time there was no unclaimed rangeland left east of the Rockies, and Sparks cast his eye further west. Joining with fellow Texan John Tinnin, Sparks bought the H-D Ranch in the Thousand Springs Valley north of Elko, Nevada, in 1881. In 1883 Sparks-Tinnin purchased all of Jasper Harrell's ranches for $900,000. At that time, the Harrell ranches consisted of approximately 30,000 head of cattle ranging over a vast area of Nevada and Idaho. Very little of that land was owned outright. Sparks-Tinnin would obtain small portions of land surrounding a water source, and then deny other operations use of that water. This allowed it to control vast areas of public land that it did not own. Sparks-Tinnin would have an employee file for a homestead on the land that it wished to own, and then sell that land back to the company, as an individual could only file for one homestead in a lifetime. At its peak, Sparks-Tinnin was said to control 6% of the land in Nevada.

In 1885, Sparks moved to his 1,640 acre (6.64 km^{2}) Alamo Ranch, located in the Steamboat Springs area just south of Reno, Nevada. There he built a "hobby" herd of pure-blood Hereford cattle. Sparks became famous at western livestock auctions by paying ridiculous sums for pedigreed Hereford cattle. By purchasing stock from other breeders rather than breeding his own, Sparks' herd was soon unbeatable at livestock shows. Sparks' sale of lesser cattle from his herd helped establish the Hereford as the dominant breed in Nevada. Sparks also raised "exotic" animals such as bison and deer at the Alamo Ranch.

The Sparks-Tinnin operation continued to grow throughout the 1880s until it, like all other western cattle operations, suffered a severe setback in the harsh winter of 1889–1890. During that winter the temperature reached −42 degrees Fahrenheit (−41 degrees Celsius) in Elko, and the range was covered in deep snow from January through March. At that time most large cattle operations in Nevada kept their cattle on the open range year round, with no supplemental feed in the winter. Losses of cattle on the range were catastrophic. In the spring of 1890, it was reported that one could walk for a hundred miles along the Humboldt River on cow carcasses, and floating carcasses jammed against bridges in Elko, causing flooding. Sparks later stated that of his herd of about 45,000 head, only 15,000 survived. He also claimed that of the survivors, 90% had the "white faces characteristic of Herefords". These were probably the descendants of Longhorn brood cows and Hereford bulls. As range cattle operations of the day typically ran one bull per twenty brood cows it was far cheaper to improve an existing herd by replacing the bulls than by creating a whole new herd. The survival rate of these Hereford/Longhorn crosses was ascribed to the superior qualities of the Hereford, however hybrid vigor may have played a role.

Following the winter of 1889–1890, Tinnin could no longer make his mortgage payments to Jasper Harrell, and Harrell took over his shares. Sparks-Tinnin was renamed Sparks-Harrell. Between his expenditures on the Alamo Ranch and losses in mining speculation, Sparks also ran into financial trouble and sold his half of Sparks-Harrell back to Jasper Harrell in 1901.

== Political career ==
After an unsuccessful Senate run, Sparks was elected Governor of Nevada in 1902 and re-elected in 1906. During this administration a state railroad commission was formed; the Nevada State Police was organized; an eight-hour work day bill for miners was passed; and a state engineering office was created.

In 1904, the town of Harriman, Nevada in Washoe County was renamed Sparks after the governor.

Sparks died while still in his second term in office on May 22, 1908. At the time of his death, he was reportedly broke, and the Alamo Ranch was immediately sold to settle his debts.

== Memorium ==
The Alamo Ranchhouse, a portion of Sparks' Alamo Ranch, survives and is listed on the U.S. National Register of Historic Places.

Party political offices
Preceded by Reinhold Sadler	Silver nominee for Governor of Nevada; 1902, 1906	Succeeded by None
Political offices
Preceded by Reinhold Sadler	Governor of Nevada; 1903–1908	Succeeded by Denver S. Dickerson
