= Denver S. Dickerson =

American politician (1872–1925)

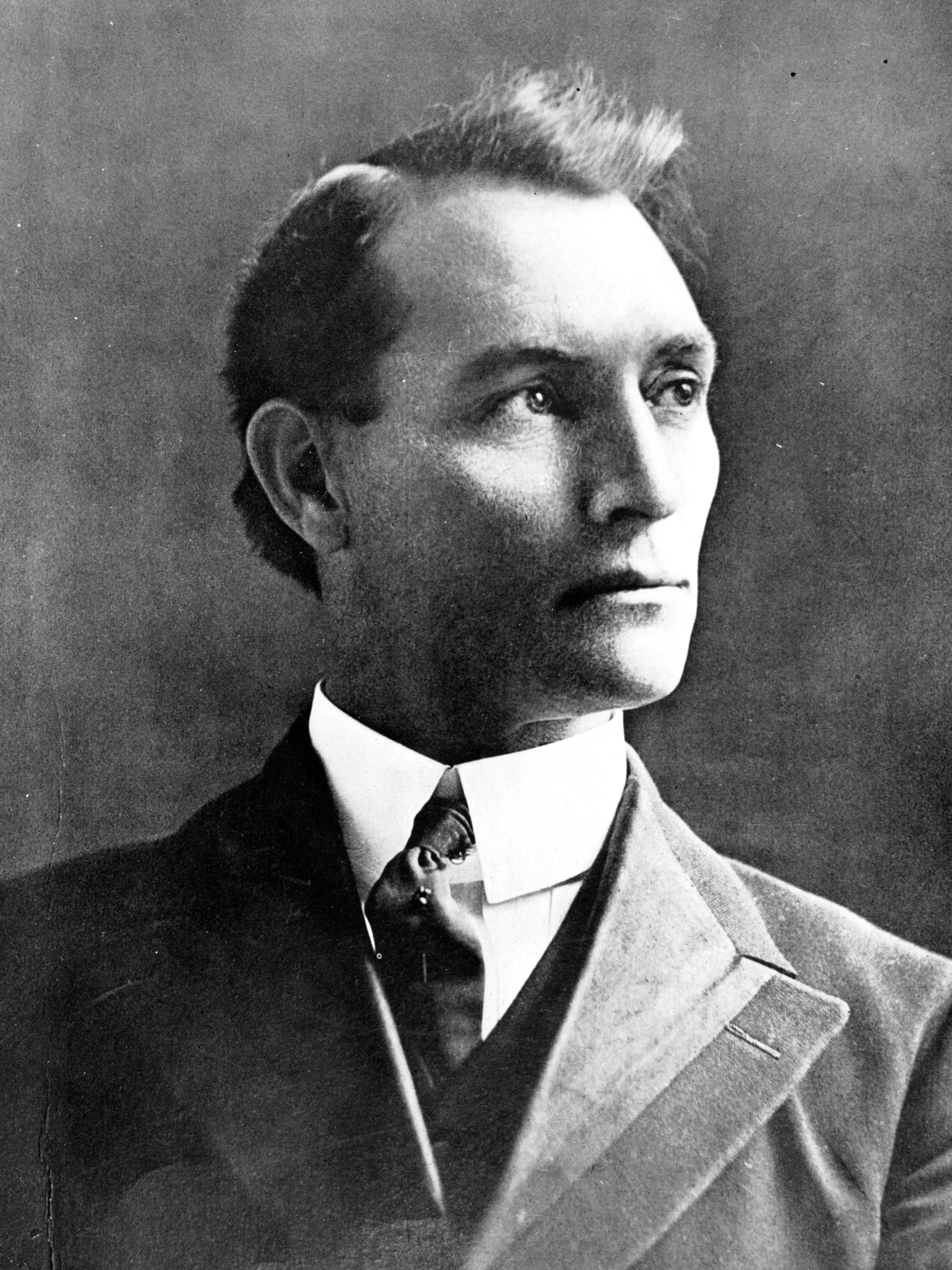
- Dickerson c. 1908–1910

11th Governor of Nevada
- In office May 22, 1908 – January 2, 1911
- Lieutenant: Vacant
- Preceded by: John Sparks
- Succeeded by: Tasker Oddie

13th Lieutenant Governor of Nevada
- In office January 1907 – May 22, 1908
- Governor: John Sparks
- Preceded by: Lemuel Allen
- Succeeded by: Gilbert C. Ross

Warden of Nevada State Prison
- In office December 23, 1923 – November 28, 1925
- Governor: James G. Scrugham
- Preceded by: Rufus B. Henrichs
- Succeeded by: Matthew R. Penrose
- In office March 10, 1913 – December 5, 1916
- Governor: Tasker Oddie; Emmet D. Boyle
- Preceded by: George W. Cowing
- Succeeded by: Rufus B. Henrichs

Superintendent of Federal Prisons
- In office January 1920 – April 2, 1921
- President: Woodrow Wilson
- Preceded by: Francis H. Duehay
- Succeeded by: Heber Herbert Votaw

Personal details
- Born: January 24, 1872 Millville, California, U.S.
- Died: November 28, 1925 (aged 53) Carson City, Nevada, U.S.
- Resting place: Lone Mountain Cemetery, Carson City; 39°10′38″N 119°45′39″W
- Party: Silver – Democratic
- Spouse: Una L. Reilly Dickerson
- Children: Harvey, Norinne, June, Donald, Denver, Belford, Barbara, George
- Profession: Publisher
- Parents: Harvey Franklin Dickerson; Catherine M. Bailey

Military service
- Branch/service: United States Army
- Years of service: 1898–1899
- Rank: First Sergeant
- Unit: 2nd Volunteer Cavalry
- Battles/wars: Spanish–American War

Denver Sylvester Dickerson (January 24, 1872 – November 28, 1925) was an American politician. He was the 11th governor of Nevada from 1908 to 1911. A member of the Silver – Democratic coalition party, he had previously held office as the 13th lieutenant governor of Nevada from 1907 to 1908. During his governorship, Dickerson worked to reform the state prison system.

After leaving office, Dickerson became the Superintendent of Federal Prisons, predecessor to the present-day Federal Bureau of Prisons. He was the warden of Nevada State Prison until his death in 1925.

== Early life ==
Dickerson was born on January 24, 1872, to Harvey Franklin and Catherine Melinda Dickerson in Millville in Shasta County, California. His father was a mining pioneer in California. Dickerson received a public school education and was later privately tutored. Dickerson pursued mining in Idaho, Montana, and Nevada.

== Military service ==
During the Spanish–American War in 1898, Dickerson was deployed as Sergeant of Troop D of the 2nd U.S. Volunteer Cavalry. Upon returning from his tour of duty as First Sergeant in 1899, Dickerson moved to White Pine County, Nevada.

== Settlement in Nevada ==
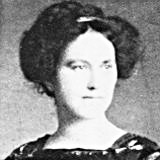
Una Reilly Dickerson

In 1902, Dickerson was elected to his first office, the clerk of White Pine County and later became county recorder. On April 23, 1904, Dickerson married Una Reilly of Cherry Creek, Nevada, in a ceremony held in Eureka, Nevada. On November 24, 1904, Dickerson and Charles A. Walker acquired the White Pine News. By October 19, 1905, Dickerson was the newspaper's editor and sole proprietor.

== State politics ==
In 1906, Dickerson decided to run for Lieutenant Governor of Nevada. While attending the Democratic State Convention in Reno as a young delegate, he discovered that no one was interested in running for the office. In May of that year, he handed over control of the White Pine News to Houlden Hudgins and sold it in the fall. On October 11, 1906, Dickerson founded the Ely Mining Expositor as a weekly paper representing the interests of the Silver-Democratic political coalition. Dickerson won the November election and took office in January 1907. The Ely Mining Expositor was helmed by various editors while Dickerson was in office and moved to daily publication by May 15, 1907.

When fellow Silver-Democrat and Governor John Sparks died in office on May 22, 1908, Dickerson became the acting governor. The Dickersons became the first family to move into the Nevada Governor's Mansion, recently completed at a cost of $22,700. On September 2, 1909, Una gave birth to June, the only child to be born in the mansion. During his gubernatorial tenure, Dickerson worked to restructure state mental hospitals and reform the state prison system. He also found support to reorganize the state Railroad Commission.

=== The "Fight of the Century" ===
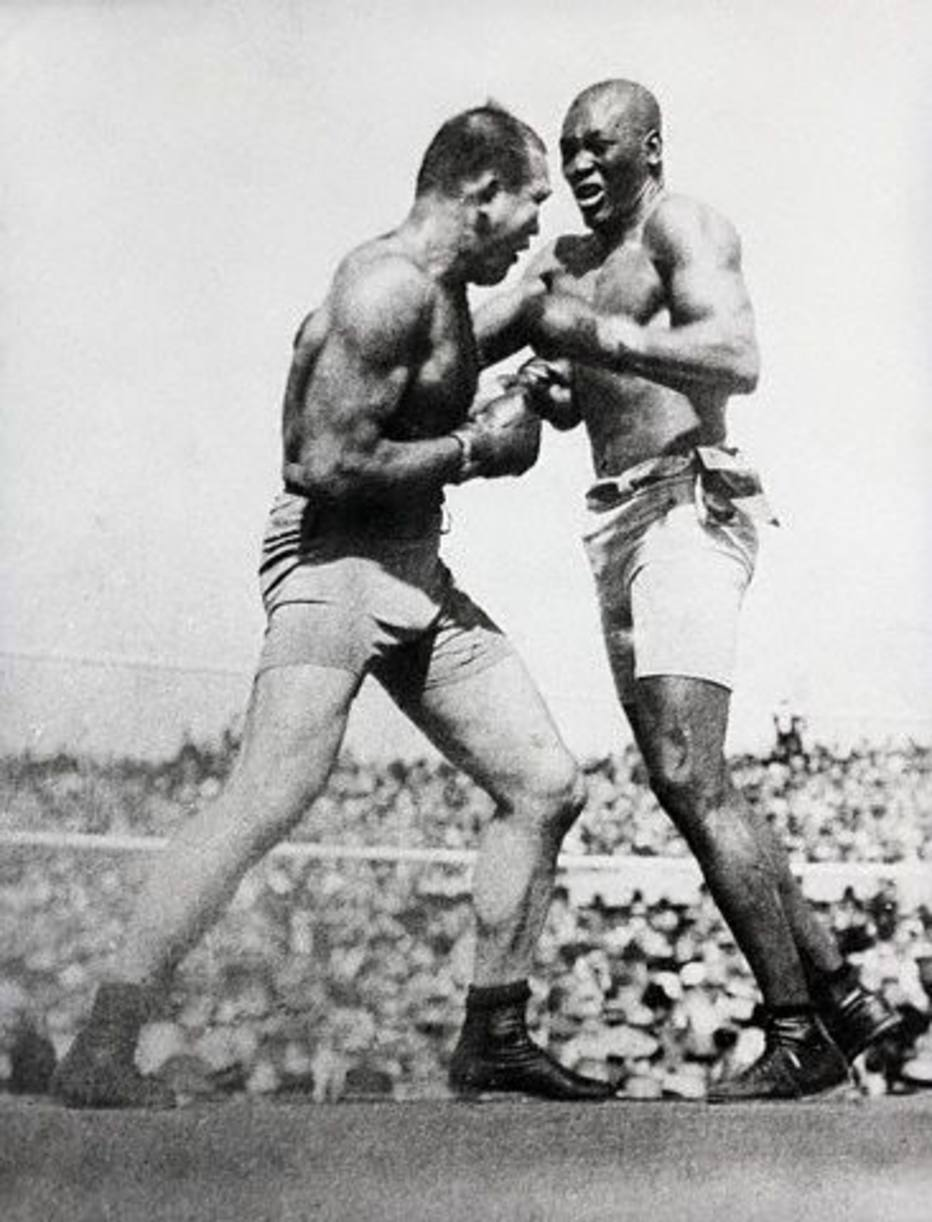
Dickerson resisted pressure to cancel the interracial boxing match between James J. Jeffries and Jack Johnson.

In 1910, former undefeated boxing champion James J. Jeffries sought to reclaim the heavyweight championship as the "great white hope" from African-American Jack Johnson. Dickerson was impressed by Johnson's boxing skills and pledged to provide an opportunity for a match in Nevada without racial prejudice. Despite national pressure against staging the event, Dickerson allowed it to proceed in Reno. Promoter Tex Rickard assured Dickerson that it would be a fair fight. On July 4, 1910, Johnson defeated Jeffries, causing a wave of unrest across the country. In the election of November 1910, Dickerson was defeated and left office on January 2, 1911.

== Later work ==
After leaving the governor's office, Dickerson was appointed superintendent of the Nevada State Police. In 1913, Dickerson was appointed the Warden of Nevada State Prison in Carson City to replace George W. Cowing, who had problems finding men willing to form a firing squad to execute convicted murderer Andriza Mircovich. The death sentence was eventually carried out by a custom-built shooting machine.

Dickerson took office as the Superintendent of Federal Prisons in January 1920 under U.S. President Woodrow Wilson. In September 1920, Jack Johnson was sent to the U.S. Penitentiary in Leavenworth, Kansas for incarceration while under Dickerson's administration. Dickerson worked to have Johnson paroled against unsubstantiated charges. Dickerson resigned on April 2, 1921, when newly elected President Warren G. Harding announced that he would appoint his brother-in-law Heber Herbert Votaw to the office.

In December 1923, Dickerson returned to Nevada State Prison. He supervised the execution of Gee Jon in February 1924, the first to be carried out by gas chamber in the United States. Dickerson remained warden until his death in November 1925.

== Legacy ==
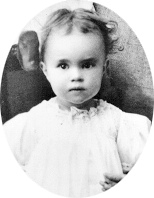
June Dickerson was the only child born in the Nevada Governor's Mansion.

Dickerson was buried at Lone Mountain Cemetery in Carson City. Afterwards, his wife Una was appointed head librarian of the law library at the courthouse in Reno, Nevada. She later retired in Reno and died on April 9, 1959, and was buried next to her husband.

The Dickersons had eight children: Harvey, Norinne, June, Donald, Denver, Belford, Barbara and George. Their sons Harvey, Denver, and George followed their father's footsteps into Nevada state politics. Harvey Dickerson was elected Attorney General of Nevada in 1954 and ran unsuccessfully for governor in 1958. Re-elected in 1962 and 1966, Dickerson became the only three time Attorney General of Nevada to serve bifurcated terms of office. The younger Denver Dickerson would go on to become the Speaker of the Nevada Assembly in 1943 and was appointed Secretary of Guam in 1963 by President John F. Kennedy. George M. Dickerson was elected District Attorney of Clark County, Nevada in 1954 and President of the State Bar of Nevada in 1973. George's older brother Harvey was the first of three Dickersons to serve as the president of the State Bar of Nevada in 1953. George's son Robert P. Dickerson was the third to serve in 1997.

== Other offices and affiliations ==
- 32nd degree Freemason
- Chairman of the Nevada Board of Education
- Nevada Board of Prison Commissioners and Insane Asylum
- President, Blaine Gold Mining and Milling Company
- President, Robinson Mining Company
- President, White Pine County Abstract and Guarantee Company
- Sagebrush Club (Carson City, Nevada)
- University Club (Ely, Nevada)

== See also ==
- Capital punishment in Nevada
- List of United States political families (Dickersons of Nevada)

Party political offices
Vacant Title last held by George Russell	Democratic nominee for Governor of Nevada; 1910	Succeeded by Emmet D. Boyle
Political offices
Preceded by John Sparks	Governor of Nevada; 1908–1911	Succeeded by Tasker Oddie
Preceded by Lemuel Allen	Lieutenant Governor of Nevada; 1907–1908	Succeeded by Gilbert C. Ross
