= Reinhold Sadler =

American politician (1848–1906)

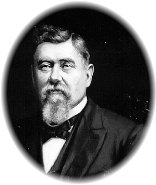

9th Governor of Nevada
- In office April 10, 1896 – January 5, 1903
- Lieutenant: Vacant; James R. Judge
- Preceded by: John E. Jones
- Succeeded by: John Sparks

10th Lieutenant Governor of Nevada
- In office 1895 – April 10, 1896
- Governor: John E. Jones
- Preceded by: Joseph Poujade
- Succeeded by: James R. Judge

Personal details
- Born: January 10, 1848 Czarnikau, Posen Province, Kingdom of Prussia (modern Czarnków, Wielkopolska Province, Poland)
- Died: January 30, 1906 (aged 58) Eureka, Nevada, U.S.
- Resting place: Lone Mountain Cemetery, Carson City
- Party: Silver
- Spouse: Louise Zadow (m. 1874)
- Children: 6

Reinhold Sadler (January 10, 1848 – January 30, 1906) was an American politician who was the ninth governor of Nevada. He was a member of the Silver Party.

He was born on January 10, 1848 in Czarnikau, Posen Province, Prussia (modern-day Czarnków, Wielkopolska Province, Poland). His education was limited to the common schools of his native country. He immigrated to the United States, first moving to Virginia City and later Eureka. He married Louise Zadow in Hamilton, Nevada on May 26, 1874, and the couple had six children, Wihlemina, William Arthur, Bertha, Edgar, Alfred, and Clarence.

== Career ==
Sadler settled in Eureka, Nevada and worked as a miner, a miller, and a merchant. He was elected treasurer of Eureka County in 1880.

After two unsuccessful campaigns for state offices, he was elected the tenth lieutenant governor of Nevada in 1895. After the death of Governor John E. Jones, Sadler became Acting Governor, making him only the third foreign-born governor of Nevada,; he was elected Governor in his own right in 1898. During his tenure, the Farmer's Institute was launched and the State Board of Assessors was established.

After finishing out his term Sadler returned to Eureka, and resumed his various business enterprises. He was a Stalwart Silver candidate for U.S. Representative at large in 1904, but was not successful.

== Death ==
Sadler died in Eureka on January 30, 1906, at the age of 58. He is interred at Lone Mountain Cemetery, Carson City, Nevada.

== See also ==
- List of United States governors born outside the United States

Party political offices
| Preceded by John Edward Jones | Silver nominee for Governor of Nevada; 1898 | Succeeded by John Sparks |
Political offices
| Preceded by John E. Jones | Governor of Nevada; 1896–1903 | Succeeded by John Sparks |
| Preceded by Joseph Poujade | Lieutenant Governor of Nevada; 1895–1896 | Succeeded by James R. Judge |
