= William A. Massey (politician) =

American judge (1856–1914)

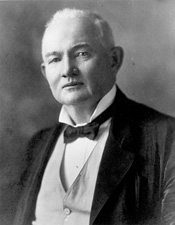

United States Senator from Nevada
- In office July 1, 1912 – January 29, 1913
- Appointed by: Tasker Oddie
- Preceded by: George S. Nixon
- Succeeded by: Key Pittman

Member of the Nevada State Assembly
- In office 1892-1894

Personal details
- Born: October 7, 1856 Trumbull County, Ohio
- Died: March 5, 1914 (aged 57) Litchfield, California, U.S.
- Party: Republican
- Profession: Attorney

William Alexander Massey (October 7, 1856 – March 5, 1914) was an American politician who served as a member of the United States Senate from Nevada.

== Early life ==
Born in Trumbull County, Ohio, he moved with his parents to Edgar County, Illinois in 1865. He attended public schools before studying at Union Christian College in Merom, Indiana and the Indiana Asbury University (now De Pauw University) in Greencastle, Indiana. He studied law and was admitted to the bar in 1877.

== Career ==
After being admitted to the bar, Massey began practicing law in Sullivan, Indiana. He moved to San Diego, California in 1886 and to Nevada in 1887, where he prospected, mined, and practiced law in Elko.

Massey was a member of the Nevada Assembly from 1892 to 1894, and was district attorney of Elko County from 1894 to 1896. He was a justice of the Nevada Supreme Court from 1897 to 1902, when he resigned. He moved to Reno, Nevada and resumed the practice of law, and was appointed as a Republican to the United States Senate by Governor Tasker Oddie, to fill the vacancy caused by the death of George S. Nixon.

Massey served in the Senate from July 1, 1912, to January 29, 1913. He was defeated for election to the remainder of Nixon's term by Democrat Key Pittman. While in the Senate, he was chairman of the Committee on Mines and Mining.

After his time in the Senate, he resumed the practice of law in Reno, Nevada.

== Death ==
Massey died on a train near Litchfield, California in March 1914.

Party political offices
Preceded by George S. Nixon	Republican nominee for U.S. Senator from Nevada (Class 1); 1913	Succeeded by Samuel Platt
U.S. Senate
Preceded by George S. Nixon	U.S. senator (Class 1) from Nevada; 1912–1913; Served alongside: Francis G. Newlands	Succeeded by Key Pittman
Legal offices
Preceded by Rensselaer R. Bigelow	Justice of the Supreme Court of Nevada; 1897–1902	Succeeded by Thomas V. Julien
