= Rensselaer R. Bigelow =

American judge (1848–1907)

Rensselaer Roscoe Bigelow

Justice of the Supreme Court of Nevada
- In office 1890–1897
- Preceded by: Thomas Porter Hawley
- Succeeded by: William A. Massey

Personal details
- Born: February 28, 1848; New York City
- Died: February 18, 1907 (aged 58); San Francisco, California
- Spouse: Roxanna C. Gooding (m. 1876)
- Children: 1 daughter, 1 son
- Occupation: Lawyer, Judge

Rensselaer Roscoe Bigelow (February 28, 1848 – February 18, 1907) was a justice of the Supreme Court of Nevada from 1890 to 1897.

== Early life, education, and career ==
Born in New York City, Bigelow served in the American Civil War as a teenager and moved to the West while still a young man. Taking up residence in Nevada, he studied law and became involved in Republican Party politics, being a candidate to serve as a presidential elector in 1880.

== Judicial service ==
In 1882, Bigelow was appointed a district court judge by Governor John Henry Kinkead. He served in that capacity for a number of years, and was elected to the state supreme court in 1890. Shortly after his election, but before the start of his elected term of office, he was appointed by acting governor Frank Bell to fill out a vacancy on the court for the remainder of the year. After finishing his term on the court, he moved to San Francisco, California, and returned to the private practice of law until his last illness and death.

== Personal life and death ==
On January 5, 1876, Bigelow married Roxanna C. Gooding, with whom he had one daughter and one son.

He died at his home in San Francisco at the age of 58, after a lingering illness that kept him bedridden for a month and a half.

Political offices
Preceded by Thomas Porter Hawley	Justice of the Supreme Court of Nevada; 1890–1897	Succeeded by William A. Massey
