= List of presidents of the University of Nevada, Reno =

The following are the presidents of the University of Nevada, Reno, from its founding in 1874 to the present day.

== List ==
| No. | Image | President | Term start | Term end | Refs. |
|---|---|---|---|---|---|
| 1 | | LeRoy D. Brown | 1887 | 1890 | |
| 2 | | Stephen A. Jones | 1890 | 1894 | |
| 3 | | Joseph Edward Stubbs | 1894 | 1914 | |
| Acting | | Robert Lewers | 1914 | 1914 | |
| 4 | | Archer W. Hendrick | 1914 | 1917 | |
| Acting | | Robert Lewers | 1917 | 1918 | |
| 5 | | Walter Ernest Clark | 1918 | 1938 | |
| 6 | | Leon W. Hartman | 1938 | 1943 | |
| Acting | | Charles Henry Gorman | 1943 | 1944 | |
| 7 | | John O. Moseley | 1944 | 1949 | |
| Acting | | Gilbert E. Parker | 1949 | 1950 | |
| 8 | | Malcolm Love | 1950 | 1952 | |
| 9 | | Minard W. Stout | 1952 | 1957 | |
| Acting | | William Ransom Wood | 1958 | 1958 | |
| 10 | | Charles J. Armstrong | 1958 | 1967 | |
| 11 | | N. Edd Miller | 1967 | 1974 | |
| 12 | | Max C. Milam | 1974 | 1978 | |
| 13 | | Joseph N. Crowley | 1978 | 2001 | |
| Interim | | Stephen C. McFarlane | 2001 | 2001 | |
| 14 | | John M. Lilley | July 1, 2001 | 2005 (Note: Resigned to lead Baylor University.) | |
| Interim | | Joseph N. Crowley | December 5, 2005 | July 31, 2006 | |
| 15 | | Milton Glick | August 1, 2006 | April 16, 2011 (Note: Died in office.) | |
| interim | | Marc Johnson | May 6, 2011 | April 20, 2012 | |
| 16 | | Marc Johnson | April 20, 2012 | October 4, 2020 | |
| 17 | | Brian Sandoval | October 5, 2020 | Present | |

Table notes:
