= 2006 Nevada Attorney General election =

- November 7, 2006
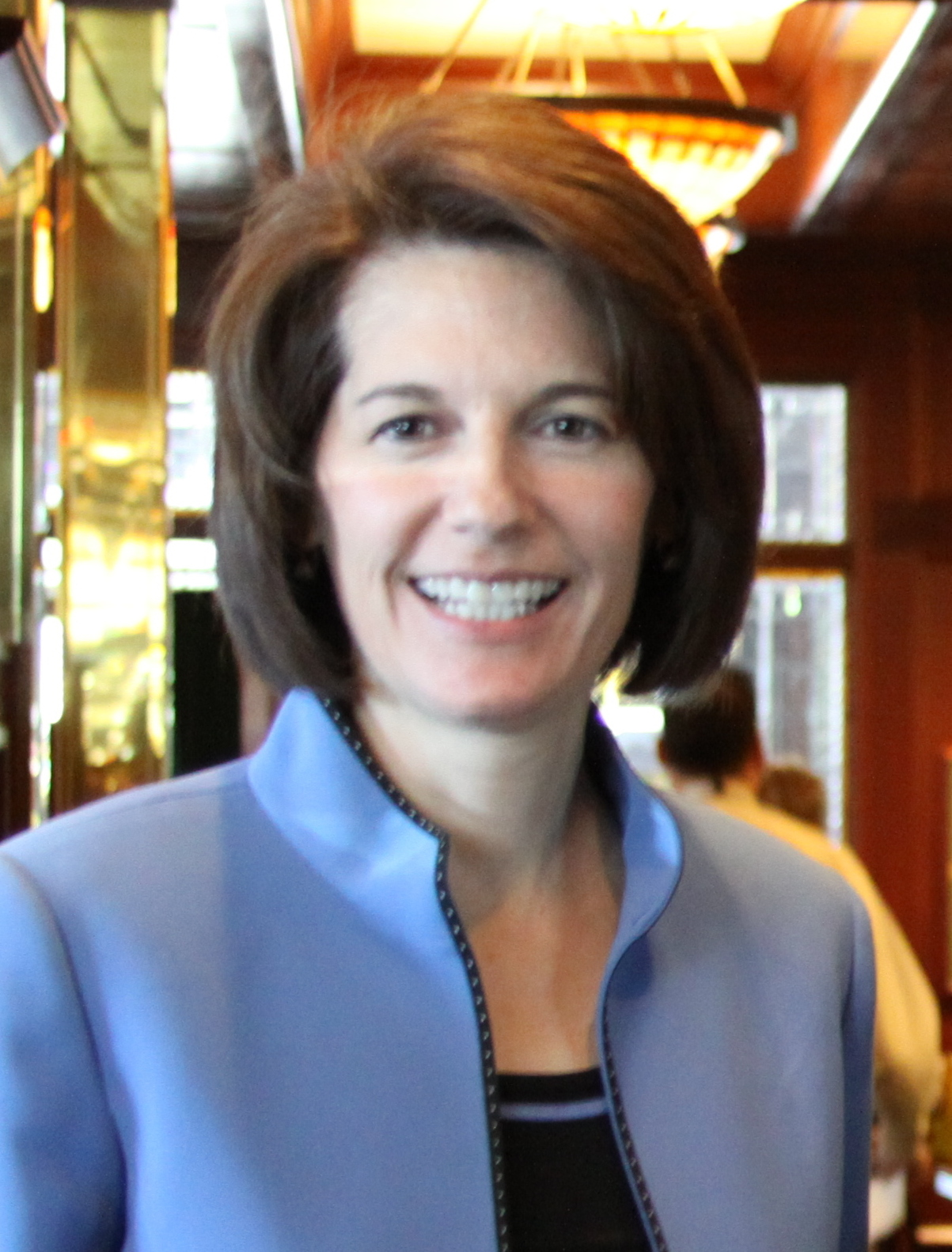

Candidate	Catherine Cortez Masto	Don Chairez	None of These Candidates
Party	Democratic	Republican
Popular vote	339,465	204,816	30,694
Percentage	59.04%	35.62%	5.34%
- County results Cortez Masto: 40–50% 50–60% 60–70% Chairez: 40–50% 50–60%
Attorney General before election
George Chanos (Note: Appointed as attorney general following the resignation of Brian Sandoval, who was appointed as a federal judge in October 2005.)
Republican
Elected Attorney General
Catherine Cortez Masto
Democratic

The 2006 Nevada Attorney General election was held on November 7, 2006, to elect the Nevada Attorney General, concurrently with elections to the United States Senate, U.S. House of Representatives, governor, and other state and local elections. Primary elections were held on August 15, 2006, though both the Republican and Democratic nominees ran uncontested.

Incumbent Republican attorney general Brian Sandoval resigned in October 2005 after being appointed as a judge for the United States District Court for the District of Nevada. Governor Kenny Guinn appointed attorney George Chanos to serve as attorney general for the remainder of Sandoval's term, though Chanos announced he would not seek a full term in March 2006. Democratic attorney Catherine Cortez Masto won the open seat over former district court judge Don Chairez.

== Republican primary ==
No Republican primary was held for attorney general in 2006. Former district court judge Don Chairez became the Republican nominee uncontested.

=== Candidates ===
==== Nominee ====
- Don Chairez, former district court judge and nominee for Nevada's 1st congressional district in 1998

==== Declined ====
- George Chanos, incumbent attorney general (2005–present)

== Democratic primary ==
No Democratic primary was held for attorney general in 2006. Attorney Catherine Cortez Masto became the Democratic nominee uncontested.

=== Candidates ===
==== Nominee ====
- Catherine Cortez Masto, attorney and former prosecutor

== General election ==
=== Results ===
2006 Nevada Attorney General election
Party	Candidate	Votes	%
Democratic	Catherine Cortez Masto	339,465	59.04%
Republican	Don Chairez	204,816	35.62%
None of These Candidates		30,694	5.34%
Total votes		574,975	100.00%
Democratic gain from Republican			

== See also ==
- 2006 United States elections
- Political party strength in Nevada
