= List of first women lawyers and judges in Nevada =

This is a list of the first women lawyer(s) and judge(s) in Nevada. It includes the year in which the women were admitted to practice law (in parentheses). Also included are women who achieved other distinctions such becoming the first in their state to graduate from law school or become a political figure.

== Firsts in Nevada's history ==
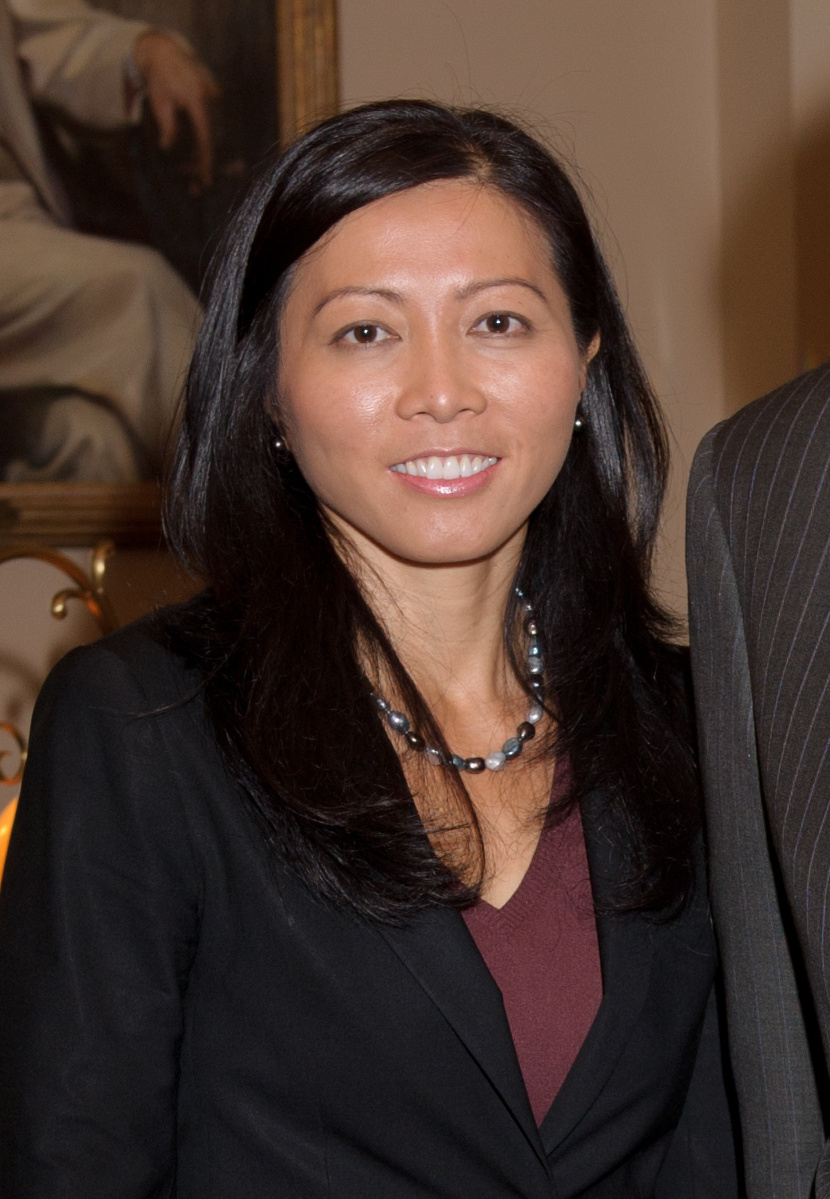
Miranda Du: First Asian American female judge in Nevada

=== Lawyers ===
- First female (admitted): Laura May Tilden Wilson (1893)
- First female (actively practice): Georgia J. Johnson Dooley (1898)
- First female (employed by U.S. Commissioner): Anna M. Warren (1899) in 1913
- First native-born and Jewish American female: Felice Cohn (1902)
- First African American females: Johnnie B. Rawlinson and Viveca Monet Woods (1980)

=== Law Clerk ===
- First female law clerk for the Supreme Court of Nevada: Rose Bird (c. 1965)

=== State judges ===
- First female (municipal court): Robin A. Wright (1979) in 1981
- First female (district court): Miriam Shearing (1969) in 1983
- First female (Supreme Court of Nevada; Chief Justice): Miriam Shearing (1969) during tenure of 1993-2005
- First African American female (any court level): Karen P. Bennett-Haron (1989) in 2002
- First Asian American female: Miranda Du (1994)
- First Hispanic American female (district court): Valorie Vega in 1999
- First Filipino American female: Cheryl Moss in 2000 (upon her election to a district court judgeship)
- First openly lesbian female (Nevada Supreme Court): Lidia S. Stiglich (2008) in 2016
- First African American female (state court): Tierra Jones in 2017
- First female (Chief Judge; Nevada Court of Appeals): Abbi Silver (1990) in 2017
- First Korean American (female) (Eighth Judicial District Court): Soonhee "Sunny" Bailey in 2021
- First African American and Asian American female (Supreme Court of Nevada): Patricia Lee in 2022
- First Indian American (female): Tina Talim in 2024

=== Federal judges ===
- First female (U.S. Magistrate Judge of the District of Nevada): Phyllis H. Atkins (1966) in 1980
- First female (U.S. Bankruptcy Court): Linda B. Riegle (1978) in 1988
- First African American female (U.S. District Court for the District of Nevada):Johnnie B. Rawlinson (1980) in 1998
- First African American female (U.S. Court of Appeals for the Ninth Circuit): Johnnie B. Rawlinson (1980) in 2000
- First Hispanic American female (U.S. District Court for the District of Nevada): Gloria Navarro (1994) in 2010
- First Asian American female (U.S. District Court for the District of Nevada): Miranda Du (1994) in 2012

=== Attorneys General of Nevada ===
- First female: Frankie Sue Del Papa (1974) in 1990
- First Latino American female: Catherine Cortez Masto in 2007

=== Deputy Attorney General ===
- First female: Kaye Richey in 1962

=== Assistant Attorney General ===
- First female: Felice Cohn (1902)

=== Federal Public Defender ===
- First female: Franny A. Forsman (1977) in 1989

=== United States Attorney ===
- First female: Kathryn E. Landreth (1981) from 1993-2001
- First Latino American (female) (Chief of the Criminal Division for the U.S. Attorney’s Office for the District of Nevada): Cristina D. Silva

=== Public Defender ===
- First female: Terri Steik Roeser (1981) in 1987

=== District Attorneys ===
- First female: Edna C. Plummer (1907) in 1918
- First females (elected): Eileen Barnett (1979) and Virginia R. Shane (1980)
- First female (serve for three counties): Patricia Dillon Cafferata

=== City Attorneys ===
- First female: Patricia A. Lynch (1973) in 1987
- First African American (female): Sandra Morgan
- First Filipino American female: Micaela Rustia Moore in 2017

=== Political Office ===
- First female (Secretary of State of Nevada): Frankie Sue Del Papa (1974) from 1987-1991
- First Latino American female (Senate): Catherine Cortez Masto (1990) in 2017

=== Nevada State Bar Association ===
- First female president: Margo Piscevich from 1994-1995

== Firsts in local history ==
- Patricia Dillon Cafferata: First female to serve as the District Attorney for Esmeralda, Lander and Lincoln Counties, Nevada
- Sanaz "Sunny" K. Soltani: First female to serve as the City Attorney for Carson City, Nevada
- Emilie N. Wanderer (1947): First female lawyer in Las Vegas, Nevada [Clark County, Nevada]
- Miriam Shearing (1969): First female elected Justice of the Peace in Las Vegas, Nevada (Clark County, Nevada; 1976)
- Camara Banfield: First African American (female) to serve as a Judge of the Clark County Superior Court (2021)
- Tsering Cornell: First Asian American (female of Tibetan descent) judge in Clark County, Nevada (2022)
- Sandra Morgan: First African American female (and African American in general) to serve as a City Attorney in North Las Vegas [Clark County, Nevada]
- Sally Loehrer: First female President of the Clark County Bar Association in Nevada (1985)
- Catherine Ramsey: First female elected judge in Las Vegas, Nevada (Clark County, Nevada; 2011)
- Diana Hampton: First female elected Judge of the Henderson Municipal Court (Clark County, Nevada; 2005)
- Tierra Jones: First African American female to serve on the Clark County District Court (2017)
- Dee Butler: First African American (female) judge in Clark County District Court’s Family Division
- Bita Yeager: First Asian American (female) appointed to the Las Vegas Justice Court [Clark County, Nevada]
- Leah Chan Grinvald: First Asian American (female) to serve as the Dean of the William S. Boyd School of Law (2022)
- Nancy Rey Jackson: First female to sit as a sworn judge of a Douglas County court (2004)
- Nancy Porter (1989): First female judge in Elko County, Nevada
- Edna C. Plummer (1907): First female District Attorney of Eureka County, Nevada (1918)
- Gemma Greene Waldron: First African American female lawyer in Reno, Nevada [Washoe County, Nevada]
- Deborah A. Agosti and Robin A. Wright: First females elected as Judges of the Washoe County District Court (1985)
- Shirley Smith: First female President of the Washoe County Bar Association in Nevada (1985)
- Patricia A. Lynch (1973): First female to serve as the City Attorney for Reno, Nevada (1987) [Washoe County, Nevada]

== See also ==
- List of first women lawyers and judges in the United States
- Timeline of women lawyers in the United States
- Women in law

== Other topics of interest ==
- List of first minority male lawyers and judges in the United States
- List of first minority male lawyers and judges in Nevada
