= Gloria Navarro =

American judge (born 1967)

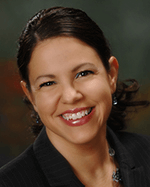

Chief Judge of the United States District Court for the District of Nevada
- In office January 1, 2014 – September 2, 2019
- Preceded by: Robert Clive Jones
- Succeeded by: Miranda Du

Judge of the United States District Court for the District of Nevada
- Incumbent
- Assumed office May 6, 2010
- Appointed by: Barack Obama
- Preceded by: Brian Sandoval

Personal details
- Born: May 2, 1967 (age 59) Las Vegas, Nevada, U.S.
- Education: University of Nevada, Las Vegas (BA); Arizona State University (JD)

Gloria Maria Navarro (born May 2, 1967) is a United States district judge of the United States District Court for the District of Nevada. Her presiding over the Bunkerville standoff received significant media attention.

== Early life and education ==
Born in Las Vegas, Nevada, Navarro earned a Bachelor of Arts degree in 1989 from the University of Nevada, Las Vegas and a Juris Doctor from the Arizona State University College of Law (now the Sandra Day O'Connor College of Law) in 1992. In 1991, Navarro worked as a legal extern for United States District Judge Philip Martin Pro.

== Career ==
In 1993, Navarro worked part-time as a mitigation investigator for a Las Vegas law firm and as a contract law clerk for several organizations. From 1994 until 1996, Navarro worked as an associate attorney for a Las Vegas law firm, and she then worked as a sole practitioner in Las Vegas from 1996 until 2001. From 2001 until 2004, Navarro served as a Deputy Special Public Defender for Clark County, Nevada. Beginning in 2005, she served as a Chief Deputy District Attorney for the Civil Division in the Clark County District Attorney's office.

=== Federal judicial service ===
On September 11, 2009, Senator Harry Reid contacted Navarro to inquire about her interest in serving on the federal bench. After a video conference interview with Reid, the senator told Navarro on September 22, 2009, that he would be recommending her to President Barack Obama for consideration to serve as a judge on the United States District Court for the District of Nevada. On December 24, 2009, Obama formally nominated Navarro to the vacancy, which was created by the resignation of Judge Brian Sandoval. On March 4, 2010, the United States Senate Committee on the Judiciary voted to send Navarro's nomination to the full Senate for consideration. On May 5, 2010, the United States Senate voted to confirm her by a 98–0 vote. She received her commission on May 6, 2010. On January 1, 2014, Navarro succeeded Robert Clive Jones as Chief Judge. She served as Chief Judge until September 2019.

==== Bunkerville standoff trials ====
In the first Bunkerville standoff case in 2017, Navarro declared a mistrial after a jury convicted two men of some of the counts in the indictment and reported that they were "hopelessly deadlocked" on the remaining counts. She scheduled retrials of the defendants in that trial for whom no verdict was reached, and trials of the remaining 11 defendants for June 26, 2017. On August 22, 2017, the remaining 4 defendants were found not guilty, and set free after being held without bail since 2016. On January 8, 2018, Judge Navarro dismissed the charges against the remaining 4 defendants "with prejudice", meaning they could not be tried again for the same charges. Navarro found that both prosecutors and the FBI had failed to turn over exculpatory evidence to the defense, and had therefore violated a "universal sense of justice" to an extent that nothing short of outright dismissal was appropriate.

== See also ==
- List of Hispanic and Latino American jurists
- List of first women lawyers and judges in Nevada

Legal offices
| Preceded by Brian Sandoval | Judge of the United States District Court for the District of Nevada; 2010–present | Incumbent |
| Preceded by Robert Clive Jones | Chief Judge of the United States District Court for the District of Nevada; 2014–2019 | Succeeded by Miranda Du |
