= 2010 Nevada Attorney General election =

- November 2, 2010
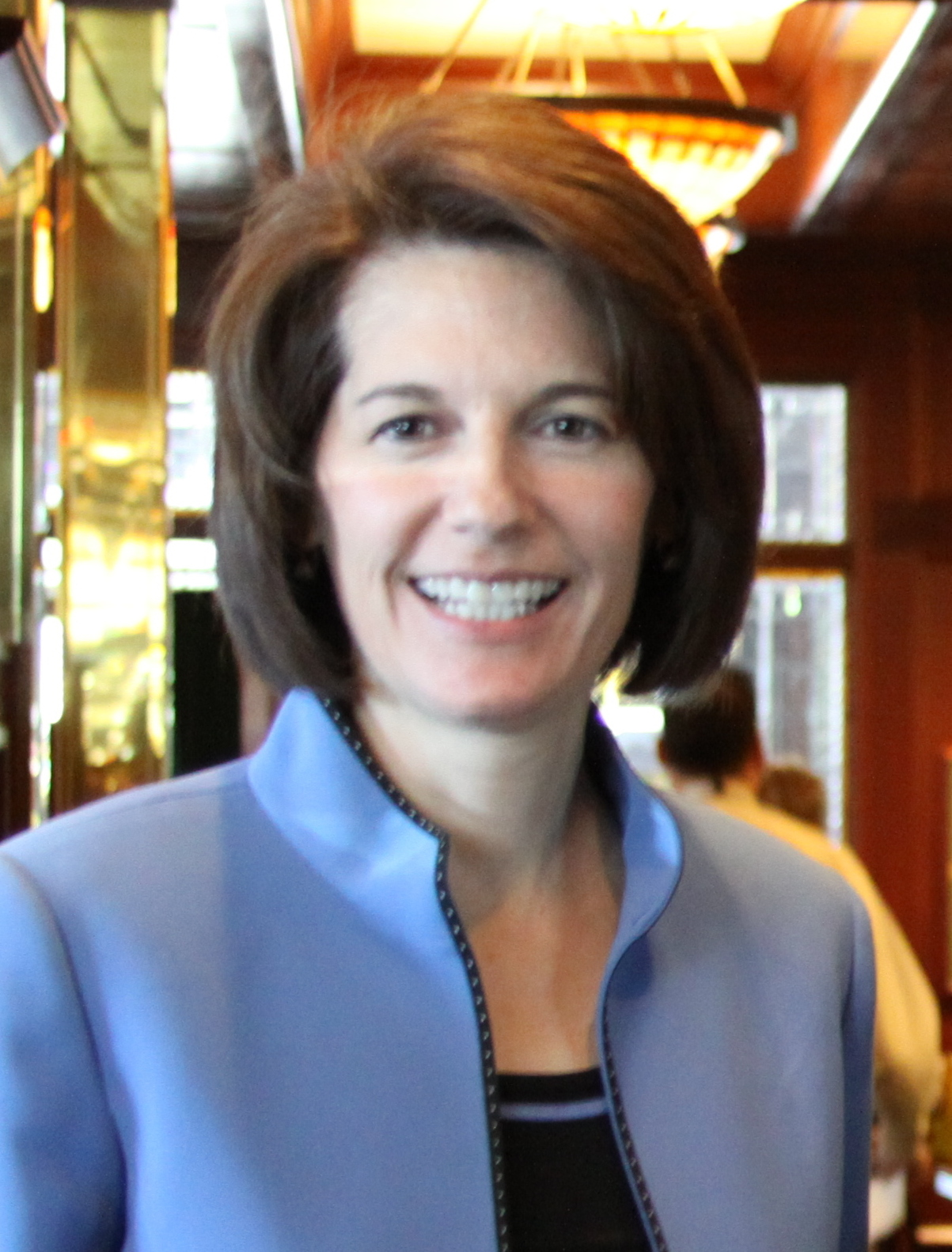

Candidate	Catherine Cortez Masto	Travis Barrick	Joel Hansen
Party	Democratic	Republican	Independent American
Popular vote	372,011	251,269	54,980
Percentage	52.82%	35.67%	7.81%
- County results Cortez Masto: 40–50% 50–60% Barrick: 40–50% 50–60%
Attorney General before election
Catherine Cortez Masto
Democratic
Elected Attorney General
Catherine Cortez Masto
Democratic

The 2010 Nevada Attorney General election was held on November 2, 2010, to elect the Nevada Attorney General, concurrently with elections to the United States Senate, U.S. House of Representatives, governor, and other state and local elections. Primary elections were held on June 8, 2010.

Despite a national red wave, incumbent Democratic attorney general Catherine Cortez Masto won re-election to a second term in office by a wide margin.

== Democratic primary ==
Incumbent Democratic attorney general Catherine Cortez Masto was the only candidate to run for attorney general in the Democratic primary, and so became the Democratic nominee uncontested.

=== Nominee ===
- Catherine Cortez Masto, incumbent attorney general (2007–present)

== Republican primary ==
=== Candidates ===
==== Nominee ====
- Travis Barrick, lawyer and former evangelical minister

==== Eliminated in primary ====
- Jacob Hafter, lawyer

=== Results ===
Republican primary results
Party	Candidate	Votes	%
Republican	Travis Barrick	69,784	44.41%
Republican	Jacob Hafter	53,752	34.21%
None of These Candidates		33,585	21.38%
Total votes		157,121	100.00%

== General election ==
=== Endorsements ===
Joel Hansen (IAP)

Individuals

- Chuck Muth, president of Citizen Outreach and former chairman of the Clark County Republican Party (Republican)
Declined to endorse

Newspapers and other media

- Las Vegas Review-Journal

=== Polling ===
Poll source	Date(s) administered	Sample size	Margin of error	Catherine Cortez Masto (D)	Travis Barrick (R)	Other	Undecided
Mason-Dixon Polling & Strategy	August 23–25, 2010	625 (RV)	± 4.0%	39%	22%	21% (Note: None of These Candidates with 16% and "Another party candidate" with 5%)	18%

=== Results ===
2010 Nevada Attorney General election
Party	Candidate	Votes	%
Democratic	Catherine Cortez Masto (incumbent)	372,011	52.82%
Republican	Travis Barrick	251,269	35.67%
Independent American	Joel Hansen	54,980	7.81%
None of These Candidates		26,072	3.70%
Total votes		704,332	100.00%
Democratic hold			
