= LeRoy D. Brown =

American university president (1848–1898)

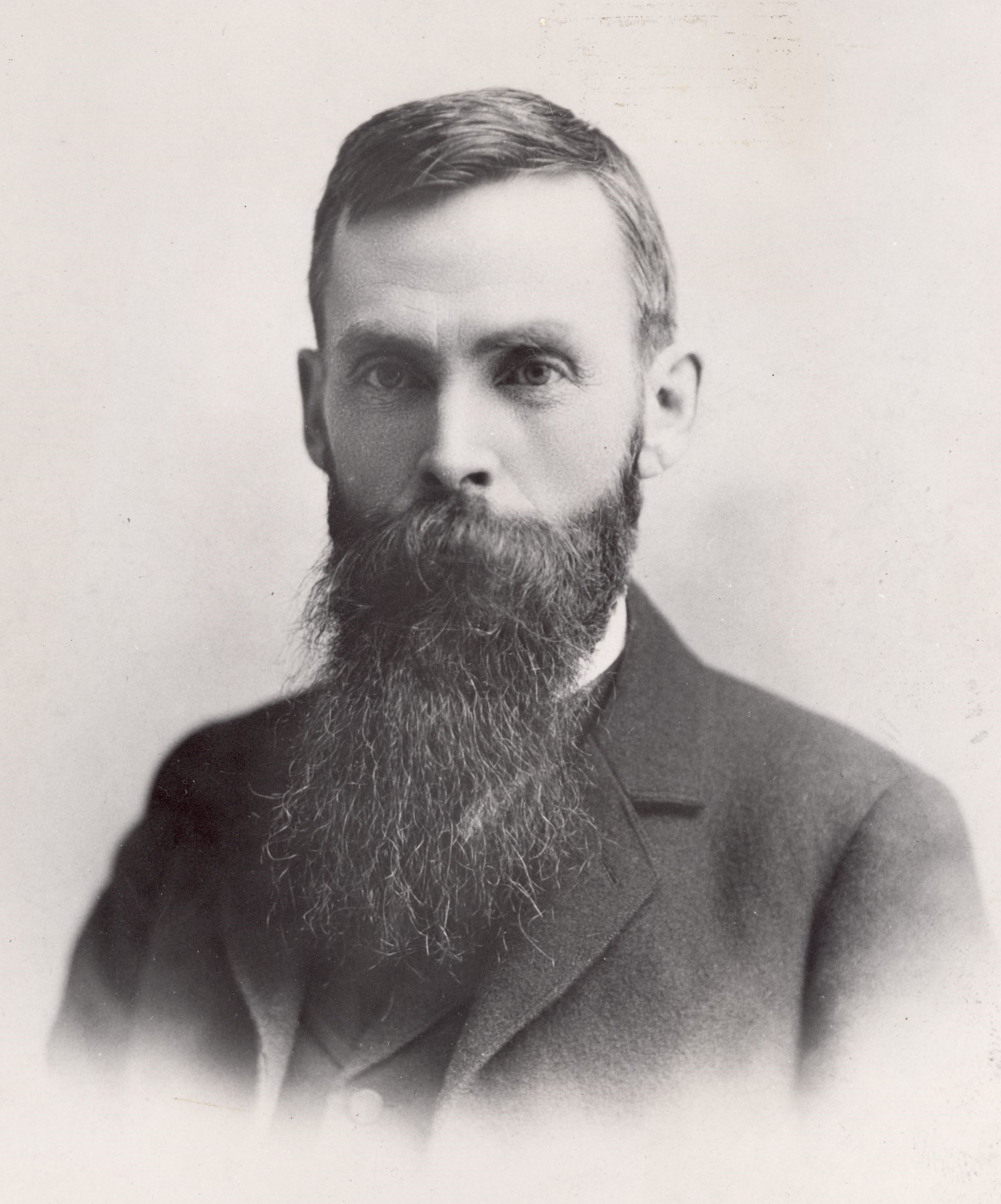
- Brown in 1887

1st Nevada State University
- In office September 1887 – January 1, 1890
- Succeeded by: Stephen A. Jones

Personal details
- Born: November 3, 1848 Center Township, Noble County, Ohio, U.S.
- Died: January 13, 1898 (aged 49) San Luis Obispo, California, U.S.
- Spouse: Esther Emma Gable (m. 1878)
- Children: 5
- Education: Ohio Wesleyan University (AB, AM); Baker University (PhD)
- Occupation: Educator

LeRoy D. Brown was the first president of University of Nevada.

== History ==
Nevada became a state in 1864. Its constitution mandated the establishment of a state university with departments in agriculture, the mechanic arts, and mining, along with a state normal school for teacher training. The constitution specified that the state university would be controlled by an elected Board of Regents. The Nevada Legislature established the first State University campus in Elko, Nevada. Its Preparatory Department opened for enrollment in October 1874 with the goal of enhancing Nevada's young people to be ready for college-level study. D. R. Sessions served as Principal of the preparatory department. The Elko campus closed on July 15, 1885, when it was determined that Reno would provide a larger population for higher education students.

The Board of Regents selected Dr. Leroy D. Brown to be the first president of the University of Nevada at the new Reno campus. A veteran of the American Civil War, he had taught in Ohio for twenty years and had been elected to the office of Commissioner of Education in Ohio. He was working for a bank in Ohio when he was recruited to Nevada. His administration began in September 1887, before the first campus building, Morrill Hall, was completely constructed.

By October, 50 students were enrolled. The Board of Regents selected Hannah Keziah Clapp of Carson City to be his assistant and a faculty member of the university. President Brown established the departments of mining and metallurgy, natural science and the Nevada State Normal School. The Secretary of War detailed a U.S. Army officer to provide drill and military tactics instruction to all male students. The first group of cadets was organized in the fall of 1888. Lieutenant Arthur C. Ducat was also employed as Professor of Modern Languages, later providing drawing instruction and calisthenics training for female students the first physical education curriculum at the university. President Brown and the other faculty developed organized a curriculum involving three areas of study: the School of Liberal Arts, the School of Agriculture, and the School of Mechanic Arts and Mining. The Nevada Agricultural Experiment Station was founded in response to the Congressional Hatch Act of March 2, 1887. Hatch Hall was completed in 1889, becoming the second building on the Reno campus. By the end of Brown's administration, the School of Mechanic Arts was separate from the School of Mining, and a Business (Commercial) Department had been created. The Commercial Department was for non-college students. Its first diplomas were issued in 1889. He resigned on January 1, 1890, later sending his son to attend the university.

== Timeline ==
- 1848 - Born in Center Township, Monroe County, Ohio on November 3. Developed a reading habit early in his life and visited the old township library in his neighborhood.
- 1864 - Ran away from home and enlisted as a member of Company H, 116 O. V. I. in which he served until the end of the war.
- 1866-1867 – Taught school
- 1867 – Brown prepared for college at an academy in Athens, Ohio
- 1869 – Became a student and was later awarded graduation at Ohio Wesleyan University at Delaware, Ohio. (A.B. ’79, A.M ’82)
- 1871 – Appointed Noble County Examiner
- 1873 – Principal of graded school in Newport, Ohio
- 1874 – Called to superintendency of the Belpre Ohio schools
- 1875 – Superintendent at Eaton, Ohio
- 1878 – Married Miss Esther Emma Gable of Eaton, Ohio
- 1879 – Brown was elected to position of Superintendent of Public schools at Hamilton, Ohio and was reelected and held the office until he became State Commissioner.
- 1883 – Earned Ph.D. at Baker University, San Luis Obispo.
- 1884-1887 – Entered into a three-year office as Ohio State Commissioner of Common Schools.
- 1887 – Brown moved his family to Alliance, Ohio to pursue the banking business.
- 1887 – 1890 - At age 38, LeRoy Brown received an offer and moved his family of seven (wife, Esther, plus five small children) to Reno, Nevada to become Nevada State University President (September 1887 - January 1, 1890).
- 1890-1892 – Became supervising Principal of Santa Monica Schools from 1890 to 1892
- 1893 to 1894 – moved to Los Angeles and became superintendent of city schools. He was reelected for another year and his salary was raised from $2,700 to $3,000 per year. Two weeks later he resigned, as he preferred the principal position of a High School and there was a vacant position.
- 1898 – Died January 13. San Luis Obispo, California
