= Anne Traum =

American judge (born 1969)

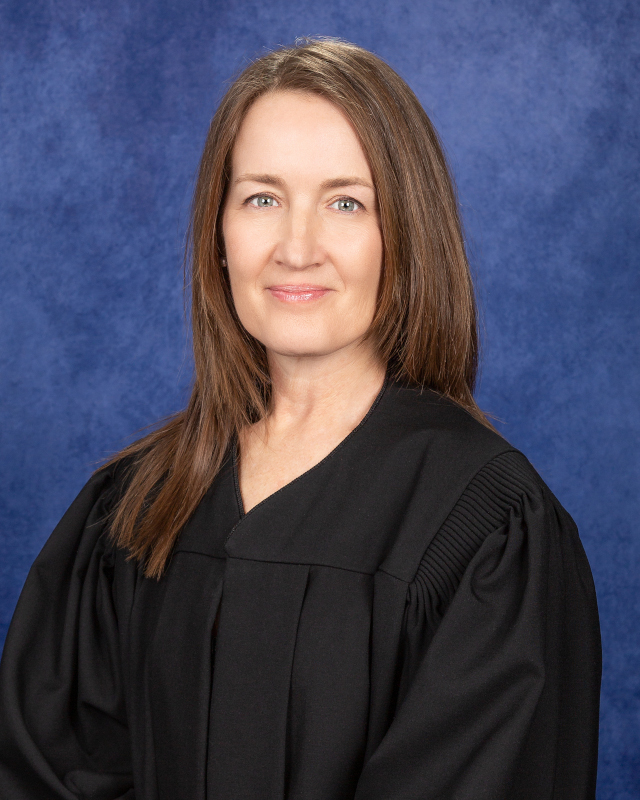

Judge of the United States District Court for the District of Nevada
- Incumbent
- Assumed office April 7, 2022
- Appointed by: Joe Biden
- Preceded by: Robert Clive Jones

Personal details
- Born: 1969 (age 56–57) Redwood City, California, U.S.
- Education: Brown University (BA); University of California, Hastings (JD)

Anne Rachel Traum (born 1969) is an American lawyer and academic who is a United States district judge of the United States District Court for the District of Nevada. She was a professor of law at the William S. Boyd School of Law in 2002 and again from 2008 to 2022.

== Early life and education ==
Traum was born in Redwood City, California. She received a Bachelor of Arts, cum laude, in 1991 from Brown University. She received a Juris Doctor in 1996 from the University of California, Hastings College of the Law.

== Career ==
Traum began her legal career as a law clerk to Judge Stanwood Duval of the United States District Court for the Eastern District of Louisiana. She served as an Assistant United States Attorney in the United States Attorney's Office for the District of Nevada from 2000 to 2002, while on detail from the Environmental and Natural Resources Division of the United States Department of Justice, where she worked from 1998 to 2000. From 2002 to 2008, she served as an assistant federal public defender in the Federal Public Defender's Office in Las Vegas, Nevada.

From 2008 to 2022, Traum was a professor of law at the William S. Boyd School of Law of the University of Nevada, Las Vegas, and she worked as the director of the Appellate Clinic from 2009 to 2022. She also served as the associate dean for experiential legal education from 2013 to 2015. She served as special counsel in the Office for Access to Justice at the United States Department of Justice from 2015 to 2016.

== Federal judicial service ==
=== Expired nomination to district court under Obama ===
On April 28, 2016, President Barack Obama nominated Traum to serve as a United States district judge of the United States District Court for the District of Nevada, to the seat vacated by Judge Robert Clive Jones, who assumed senior status on February 1, 2016. Her nomination expired on January 3, 2017, with the end of the 114th Congress.

=== Renomination to district court under Biden ===
On November 3, 2021, President Joe Biden announced his intent to nominate Traum to serve as a United States district judge of the United States District Court for the District of Nevada. On December 15, 2021, a hearing on her nomination was held before the Senate Judiciary Committee. The confirmation hearings were particularly contentious when Senator John Kennedy of Louisiana asked her nine separate times whether criminal misbehavior should be forgiven in the name of social justice, without receiving a direct yes or no response. On January 3, 2022, her nomination was returned to the President under Rule XXXI, Paragraph 6 of the United States Senate; she was later renominated the same day. On January 20, 2022, her nomination was reported out of committee by a 12–10 vote. On March 16, 2022, the Senate invoked cloture on her nomination by a 52–45 vote. On March 23, 2022, her nomination was confirmed by a 49–47 vote. She received her judicial commission on April 7, 2022.

== See also ==
- Joe Biden judicial appointment controversies

Legal offices
Preceded by Robert Clive Jones	Judge of the United States District Court for the District of Nevada; 2022–present	Incumbent
