= Laura May Tilden Wilson =

American lawyer

Laura May Tilden Wilson (1872–1928) was Nevada's first female lawyer.

She was born on April 24, 1872, in Sacramento, California, to Marcellus Crane Tilden and Elizabeth J. Ralston. By 1880, Wilson’s family resided in Virginia City, Nevada, and her father was practicing as an attorney. Her maternal grandfather was James Harvey Ralston, a judge and state senator who enter politics in both Sacramento and Virginia City. While there is no record that Wilson ever attended law school, she did graduate from the Normal School (now San Jose State University) in San Jose, California, in 1889. As a result, Wilson most likely was an autodidact of law and received her legal tutelage from her father.

On July 23, 1893, Wilson passed the bar and became the first female in Nevada admitted to practice law. She was also noted as convincing the 1893 Nevada Legislature to give women the ability to become attorneys like their male counterparts. She joined her father's law practice in Sacramento the following year. Upon the loss of her father, Wilson married Fred Ray in 1898, and relocated to Colorado (upon Ray's death) and became a lawyer in 1901. It was in Colorado that she married Walter Curtis Wilson and continued to practice law until 1914.

She died on May 31, 1928, after suffering injuries from a car accident in Montrose County, Colorado.

== See also ==
- List of first women lawyers and judges in Nevada
