= Viveca Monet Woods =

American lawyer

Viveca Monet Woods was one of Nevada's first two African American female lawyers. In 1980, she and Johnnie B. Rawlinson became the first African American females admitted to practice law in Nevada. Woods later became the first African American woman to serve as an Assistant United States Attorney in Nevada.

== See also ==
- List of first women lawyers and judges in Nevada
