= Miranda Du =

American judge (born 1969)

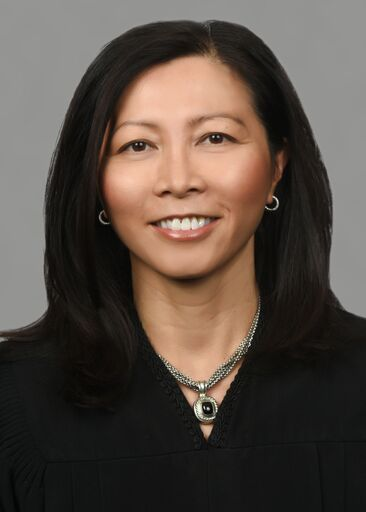

Chief Judge of the United States District Court for the District of Nevada
- In office September 2, 2019 – September/October 2024
- Preceded by: Gloria Navarro
- Succeeded by: Andrew P. Gordon

Judge of the United States District Court for the District of Nevada
- Incumbent
- Assumed office March 30, 2012
- Appointed by: Barack Obama
- Preceded by: Roger L. Hunt

Personal details
- Born: 1969 (age 56–57) Cà Mau, South Vietnam (now Vietnam)
- Education: University of California, Davis (BA); University of California, Berkeley (JD)

Miranda Mai Du (born 1969) is an American lawyer who has served as a United States district judge of the United States District Court for the District of Nevada. As a district judge, Du has presided over a number of noteworthy cases, including a number regarding voting rights. She served as the chief judge of the court 2019 to 2024.

== Early life and education ==
Du was born in Cà Mau, Vietnam, in 1969. During the Vietnam War, her father had been a supporter of the U.S.-backed Army of the Republic of Vietnam, and the family left to seek asylum in Malaysia when Du was nine years old, fleeing the country by boat. Du's family spent nearly a year in Malaysian refugee camps before ultimately being granted asylum in the United States, being sponsored by a family in Winfield, Alabama. Growing up, Du and her family lived in a number of places across the United States, including Winfield, Alabama, where her father worked on a dairy farm. The family also lived at various times in Tuscaloosa, Alabama; Seattle, Washington; and Oakland, California. Du participated in Upward Bound in high school.

Du received a Bachelor of Arts from University of California, Davis, in 1991, graduating with honors in history and economics. She earned her Juris Doctor from University of California, Berkeley School of Law in 1994.

== Career ==
Upon graduating from law school, Du was admitted to the bar in Nevada in 1994 and in California in 1995. She took a job as an associate at the law firm McDonald Carano Wilson LLP in 1994 and was promoted to partner in 2002. She practiced for about one year in Las Vegas, before transferring to the firm's Reno, Nevada office. Du practiced employment law, serving as chair of her firm's employment and labor practice group.

=== Federal judicial service ===
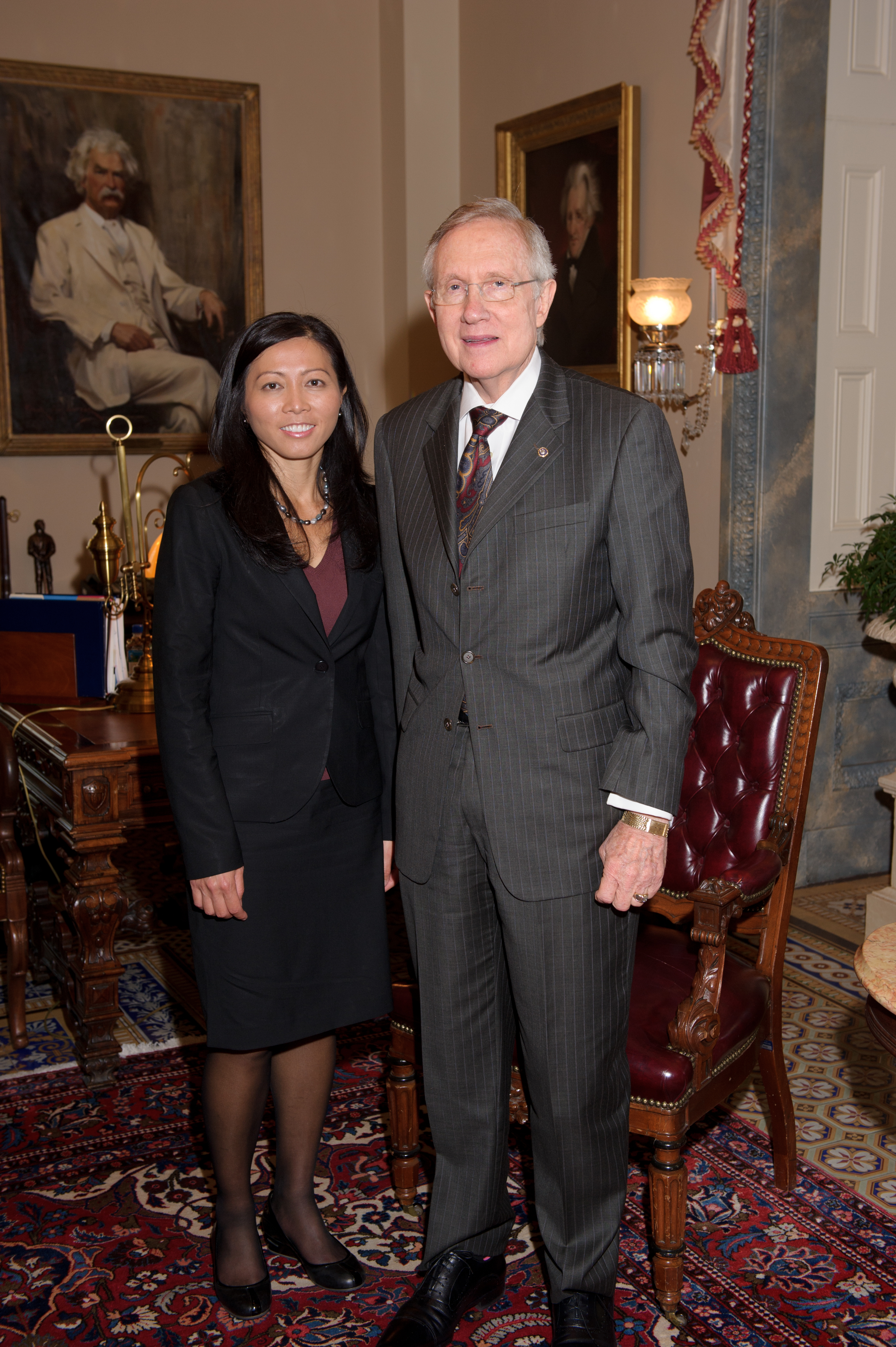
Miranda Du in 2012 with Senate Majority Leader Harry Reid.

On August 2, 2011, President Barack Obama nominated Du to replace Judge Roger L. Hunt, who assumed senior status. A substantial majority of the American Bar Association's Standing Committee on the Federal Judiciary, which rates the qualifications of judicial nominees, rated Du as "qualified" for the post, with a minority rating her "not qualified" (the committee rates on a three-tier scale: well qualified, qualified, and not qualified). Du's nomination and confirmation were strongly supported by Nevada's two U.S. senators, Harry Reid (Democrat) and Dean Heller (Republican), as well as the Congressional Asian Pacific American Caucus. Her confirmation was opposed by some Republican senators, who viewed her as too inexperienced and cited a sanction against her in 2007 by a Nevada federal court.

On November 3, 2011, the Senate Judiciary Committee reported her nomination to the Senate floor by a 10–8 vote. On March 28, 2012, Du's nomination was confirmed by a 59–39 vote. She received her commission two days later. Du became the first Asian Pacific American to serve as an Article III judge in Nevada.

As a new district judge, Du initially worked in Las Vegas, but after about a year transferred her chambers to Reno, where she remains based. She became chief judge of the court on September 2, 2019, after Judge Gloria Navarro finished her term as chief judge. Du served as chief judge of the court during the coronavirus pandemic, during which all federal trials and naturalization ceremonies in the judicial district were postponed. Her term as chief judge ended in September or October 2024. Du is part of the court's Patent Pilot Program, which allows judges who are not part of the program to have new patent and plant variety protection cases randomly reassigned to a judge who is participating in the program.

In February 2020, a Nevada prison inmate was sentenced to four years in prison for making threats of violence against Du.

==== Voting rights decisions ====
In 2016, Du granted a preliminary injunction sought by members of two Nevada Native American tribes (the Pyramid Lake Paiute and Walker River Paiute), compelling the Washoe County registrar to set up early voting polling places at the tribes' reservations (in Nixon and Schurz), and to set up an Election Day polling place at Nixon. In the absence of the ruling, many tribal members would have had to travel nearly 100 miles round trip to reach polling sites, and Du ruled that Section 2 of the Voting Rights Act of 1965 required the state to take the location of their reservations into account when planning polling locations. Du denied the plaintiffs' request to require the state to set up in-person voter registration locations at the reservations, holding that the tribes lacked standing to seek that form of relief.

In April and May 2020, Du twice rejected requests made by the right-wing group True the Vote and Nevada Right to Life seeking to cancel Nevada's mostly all-mail primary elections, which was put in place by Nevada Secretary of State Barbara Cegavske because in-person voting risked spreading COVID-19. Du held that the groups lacked standing to seek to block an all-mail election and that "Defendants' interests in protecting the health and safety of Nevada's voters and to safeguard the voting franchise in light of the COVID-19 pandemic far outweigh any burden on Plaintiffs' right to vote, particularly when that burden is premised on a speculative claim of voter fraud resulting in dilution of votes."

In May 2020, Du issued a decision granting Fair Maps Nevada (a political action committee backed by the Nevada League of Women Voters) additional time to collect voter signatures necessary to put a question on the ballot to create an independent Nevada redistricting commission. Du held that because the COVID-19 stay-at-home order issued by the Nevada authorities effectively prevented Fair Maps Nevada from gathering signatures for the period that the order was in effect, the Nevada Secretary of State's decision to refuse to extend the deadline to collect signatures was unreasonable and violated the First Amendment. Du therefore extended the deadline to August 2020. However, Du declined Fair Maps Nevada's request to allow electronic signature gathering.

==== Environment and land use decisions ====
In 2015, Du denied a request by a number of rural Nevada counties, mining companies, and ranchers seeking a preliminary injunction to block a U.S. Department of the Interior policy that restricted development on federal lands in Nevada and eastern California to protect the greater sage grouse. Du held that the plaintiffs had failed to demonstrate imminent, irreparable harm, a prerequisite for obtaining a preliminary injunction. In 2020, Du sided with the U.S. Forest Service and conservationists in upholding the Forest Service's power to prohibit off-roading within a 4 miles (6.4 km) "buffer area" in the Mono Basin along the California-Nevada border for a three-month period, to protect the greater sage grouse mating grounds. The Sierra Trail Dogs Motorcycle and Recreation Club sued the Forest Service over the rule, which forced the postponement of the club's annual dirt bike race; Du held that under the National Environmental Policy Act, the Forest Service's prohibition was a minor variation of the previously issued environmental impact statement, and therefore the agency was not required to conduct a supplemental environmental review.

In 2019, Du rejected a request by the Nevada state government for a preliminary injunction to block the U.S. Department of Energy from shipping weapons-grade plutonium from South Carolina's Savannah River Site to the Nevada National Security Site. Du found that an injunction was unwarranted because Nevada "cannot demonstrate the likelihood of irreparable harm in the absence of preliminary injunctive relief or that the balance of hardships tips in its favor". Nevada's appeal to the Ninth Circuit was dismissed as moot because the federal government completed the plutonium shipments to Nevada.

==== Criminal law decisions ====
In 2015, Du granted the habeas petition of Jose Echavarria, a death row inmate convicted of killing an FBI agent during a bank robbery in 1991. Echavarria's attorneys argued that his trial was unfair because the presiding judge was also being investigated by the FBI – a fact the defense did not learn until after the trial ended. Du agreed and ruled that Echavarria was entitled to a new trial. Du's ruling was upheld by the U.S. Court of Appeals for the Ninth Circuit.

Du also presided over the criminal case against a doctor and hospital executive from Winnemucca in rural Nevada who illegally wrote prescriptions for opioids without a medical purpose. The executive pleaded guilty to distribution of a controlled substance; Du sentenced him to a year and a day in federal prison, a $125,000 fine, and three years of supervised release.

==== Other notable decisions ====
Du was assigned to preside over Walden v. State of Nevada ex rel. Nevada Department of Corrections, a major employment suit brought by several hundred Nevada state prison guards against the state. The guards allege that they are entitled to payment for tasks (such as debriefings, equipment collection, and uniform inspections) completed just before their shifts officially begin. In 2018, Du found that the state of Nevada had waived its sovereign immunity from suit by removing the guards' case from state court to federal court; that the pre-shift activities were "integral and indispensable" to the guards' jobs; and that the guards could thus pursue federal Fair Labor Standards Act claims against the state relating to overtime pay. Du dismissed the guards' breach-of-contract claims.

In 2019, Du dismissed a suit brought by three Texas women who argued that Nevada's legal prostitution law (the only one of its kind in the United States) conflicted with federal sex trafficking laws and therefore violated the Supremacy Clause of the U.S. Constitution. The women alleged that they had been victims of sexual violence in Nevada attributable to Nevada's legal brothels. In dismissing the suit, Du wrote: "While the Court empathizes with Plaintiffs for their lived experiences, the Court cannot adjudicate Plaintiffs' claims because Plaintiffs fail to establish standing to confer jurisdiction upon this Court."

In May 2020, during the COVID-19 pandemic in Nevada, Du denied a church's request for an emergency injunction that would allow it to exceed a 50-person cap on religious gatherings imposed by Governor Steve Sisolak to slow the spread of COVID-19. The church asserted that the 50-person limit violated their right to free exercise of religion and sought a court order allowing the church to exceed the limit for Pentecost Sunday services. Du denied the motion, writing that although the church members undoubtedly had "sincerely held religious convictions" they had failed to demonstrate "the diligence required to warrant emergency relief" because they had waited until one business day before Pentecost Sunday to seek an emergency injunction.

In September 2020, Du ruled that Tesla, Inc. could not be sued for defamation after falsely alleging to several news outlets that a former employee, Martin Tripp, may "come back and shoot people" at Tesla's Gigafactory in Nevada. In the same ruling, Du refused to dismiss Tesla's suit against Tripp for leaking a Tesla document.

In April 2025, Du ruled that "a tower dump is a search and the warrant law enforcement used to get it is a general warrant forbidden under the Fourth Amendment" but that "the Court will not order any evidence suppressed".

== See also ==
- List of Asian American jurists
- List of first women lawyers and judges in Nevada

Legal offices
Preceded by Roger L. Hunt	Judge of the United States District Court for the District of Nevada; 2012–present	Incumbent
Preceded by Gloria Navarro	Chief Judge of the United States District Court for the District of Nevada; 2019–2024	Succeeded by Andrew P. Gordon
