= Herbert Choy =

American judge (1916–2004)

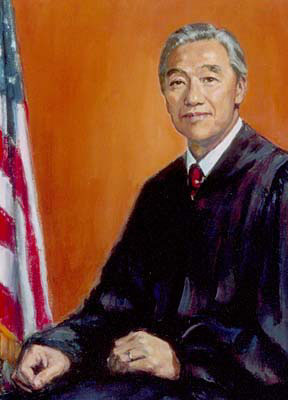

Senior Judge of the United States Court of Appeals for the Ninth Circuit
- In office October 3, 1984 – March 10, 2004

Judge of the United States Court of Appeals for the Ninth Circuit
- In office April 23, 1971 – October 3, 1984
- Appointed by: Richard Nixon
- Preceded by: Stanley Barnes
- Succeeded by: Melvin T. Brunetti

Personal details
- Born: Herbert Young Cho Choy; January 6, 1916 Makaweli, Territory of Hawaii
- Died: March 10, 2004 (aged 88) Honolulu, Hawaii, U.S.
- Spouse: Helen Shular Choy (m. 1945)
- Education: University of Hawaii (BA); Harvard University (JD)

Korean name
- Hangul: 최영조
- RR: Choe Yeongjo
- MR: Ch'oe Yŏngjo

Herbert Young Cho Choy (January 6, 1916 – March 10, 2004) was the first Asian American to serve as a United States federal judge and the first person of Korean ancestry to be admitted to the bar in the United States. He served as a United States circuit judge of the United States Court of Appeals for the Ninth Circuit.

== Education and career ==
Born to Korean immigrants who worked in sugar plantations in Hawaii on January 6, 1916, in Makaweli, Kauai, Hawaii, Choy received a Bachelor of Arts degree in 1938 from the University of Hawaii. He received a Juris Doctor in 1941 from Harvard Law School. He served in the Hawaii Territorial Guard from 1941 to 1942. He served in the United States Army from 1942 to 1946. In 1946, Choy served in the Judge Advocate General's Corps. Choy was in private practice in Honolulu, Hawaii, from 1946 to 1971. He was the first person of Korean ancestry to be admitted to the practice of law in the United States. He served with the law firm of Fong Miho Choy & Robinson from 1947 to 1957, with one of his partners being future United States Senator Hiram Fong. From 1957 to 1958, Choy served as Attorney General for the Territory of Hawaii.

== Federal judicial service ==
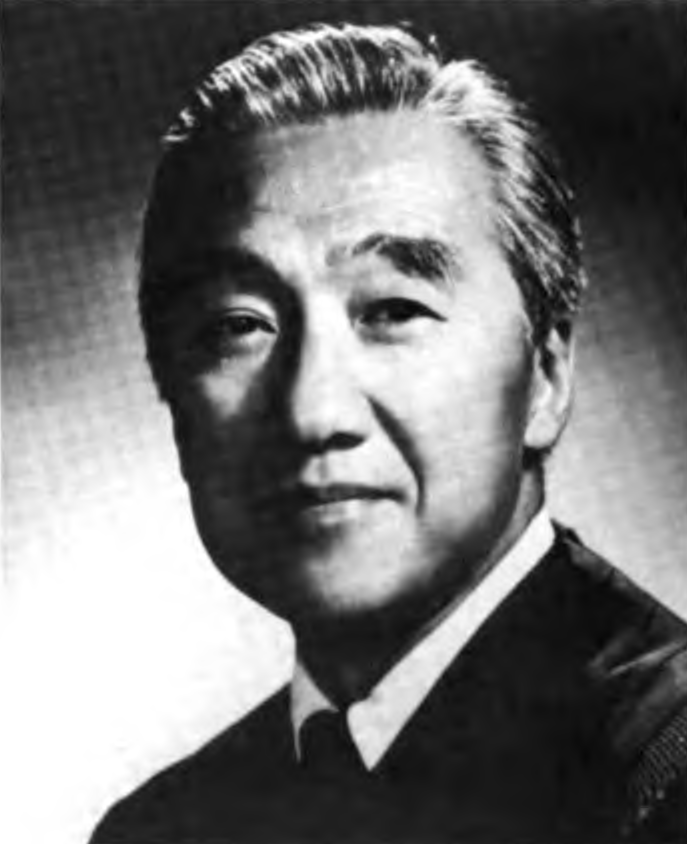
Choy in the 1970s.

At the recommendation of Senator Fong, Choy was nominated by President Richard Nixon on April 7, 1971, to a seat on the United States Court of Appeals for the Ninth Circuit vacated by Judge Stanley Barnes. He was confirmed by the United States Senate on April 21, 1971, and received his commission on April 23, 1971. He was the first Asian American on the federal bench as well as the first Hawaii native. He assumed senior status on October 3, 1984. His service terminated on March 10, 2004, due to his death.

=== Former clerk ===
In 2001, one of Choy's former law clerks, Richard Clifton, became the second judge from Hawaii to serve on the Ninth Circuit.

== Personal ==
Chou married Dorothy Helen "Henny" Shular on June 19, 1945. They had no children.

== Death ==
Choy died in Honolulu on March 10, 2004, due to complications from pneumonia.

== See also ==
- Shiro Kashiwa - first Japanese American federal judge (1972)
- Masaji Marumoto - first Asian American territorial court justice (1956)
- Kathryn Doi Todd - first female Asian American judge in the U.S. (1978)
- Wilfred Tsukiyama - first Asian American state chief justice (1959)
- Delbert E. Wong - first Chinese American judge in the continental U.S. (1959)

Legal offices
Preceded by Stanley Barnes	Judge of the United States Court of Appeals for the Ninth Circuit; 1971–1984	Succeeded by Melvin T. Brunetti
