= Robert Clive Jones =

American judge (born 1947)

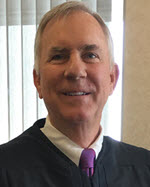

Senior Judge of the United States District Court for the District of Nevada
- Incumbent
- Assumed office February 1, 2016

Chief Judge of the United States District Court for the District of Nevada
- In office 2011 – January 1, 2014
- Preceded by: Roger L. Hunt
- Succeeded by: Gloria Navarro

Judge of the United States District Court for the District of Nevada
- In office November 30, 2003 – February 1, 2016
- Appointed by: George W. Bush
- Preceded by: David Warner Hagen
- Succeeded by: Anne Traum

Judge of the Bankruptcy Appellate Panel for the Ninth Circuit
- In office 1986–1999

Judge of the United States Bankruptcy Court for the District of Nevada
- In office February 1983 – 1999

Personal details
- Born: Robert Clive Jones; July 21, 1947 (age 78) Las Vegas, Nevada, U.S.
- Spouse: Anita M. Bunker
- Education: Brigham Young University (BS); University of California, Los Angeles (JD)

Military service
- Branch/service: United States Army
- Years of service: 1971-1972 (NVANG); 1972-1977 (CAANG)
- Rank: Staff Sergeant
- Unit: Nevada Army National Guard; California Air National Guard

Robert Clive Jones (born July 21, 1947) is a senior United States district judge of the United States District Court for the District of Nevada. He served as the Chief United States District Judge from 2011 to 2014.

== Biography ==
Jones was born in Las Vegas. He graduated with a Bachelor of Science degree from Brigham Young University where he majored in English, accounting and economics in 1971, becoming a CPA soon after graduation. Jones attended UCLA School of Law, where he was an editor of the UCLA Law Review, receiving a Juris Doctor. He served in the United States Army National Guard from 1971 to 1972, and then in the United States Air National Guard from 1972 to 1977.

== Career ==
In 1975, Jones was a law clerk to Judge J. Clifford Wallace of the United States Court of Appeals for the Ninth Circuit. From 1976 to 1982, he was in private practice.

=== Bankruptcy judge ===
Jones was appointed by the U.S. Court of Appeals for the Ninth Circuit as a bankruptcy judge from 1983 to 1999, serving as Chief Judge from 1984 to 1993. He was also appointed to the Bankruptcy Appellate Panel for the Ninth Circuit from 1986 to 1999. For six years, he served on the national Judicial Conference Committee on codes of conduct, handling ethics issues for federal judges throughout the nation.

=== Federal district judge ===
On June 9, 2003, Jones was nominated by President George W. Bush to a seat on the United States District Court for the District of Nevada vacated by David Warner Hagen. Jones was unanimously confirmed by the United States Senate on October 2, 2003, and received commission on November 30, 2003. He assumed senior status on February 1, 2016. Jones was still hearing cases as of 2022. However, Jones appears to be inactive as of December 2025.

==== Notable cases ====
In August 2012, Jones held that Nevada's election law giving voters the ability to select "None of These Candidates" was unconstitutional. The following month, a three-judge panel of the United States Court of Appeals for the Ninth Circuit blocked the preliminary injunction issued by Jones, granting an emergency stay. One member of that panel, Judge Stephen Reinhardt, criticized Jones' handling of the case: "His dilatory tactics appear to serve no purpose other than to seek to prevent the state from taking an appeal of his decision before it prints the ballots.... Such arrogance and assumption of power by one individual is not acceptable in our judicial system." The case was ultimately dismissed for lack of standing.

In November 2012, in the case of Sevcik v. Sandoval, Jones ruled that Nevada's denial of marriage rights to same-sex couples does not violate the Equal Protection Clause of the U.S. Constitution. Jones stated that,"a meaningful percentage of heterosexual persons would cease to value the civil institution as highly as they previously had and hence enter into it less frequently." He also wrote that adoption is "not an alternative means of creating children, but rather a social backstop for when traditional biological families fail." In October 2014, a unanimous panel of the Ninth Circuit reversed Jones's ruling and directed him to promptly enjoin the state of Nevada from "preventing otherwise qualified same-sex couples from marrying". However, instead of issuing the order, Jones issued an order recusing himself the next day.

In August 2013, Jones did not sign a letter to the leaders of the United States Congress urging them to avoid further sequestration related budget cuts. The letter explained that further cuts would have a "devastating and long-lasting impact" on federal courts.

In September 2015, having cited case law that raised concerns about "exhibit[ing] personal bias," the Ninth Circuit identified Jones as having "well established and inappropriately strong" feelings against out-of-state attorneys and directed reassignment of one of his cases to a different judge in order "to maintain the appearance of justice".

In January 2016, the Ninth Circuit reversed a decision by him in a case involving a claim for damages by the federal government against ranchers who grazed their cattle on federal property without a permit. The Ninth Circuit stated that Judge Jones's rulings in the case were "plainly" and "clearly" contrary to law; that he had "grossly abused the power of contempt"; that he had "harbored animus" against federal agencies; that his "bias" was a "matter of public record"; and that he had engaged in "improper treatment of government officials" in a previous case. The Ninth Circuit stated that it had "expressed concern about Judge Jones' conduct in several other recent cases". In remanding the case to the district court for further proceedings, the panel ordered the assignment of the case to a different judge due to the appearance of bias created by Judge Jones' conduct during the case.

In March 2016, the Ninth Circuit removed Jones from hearing a case between Burning Man and Pershing County, Nevada. In its ruling, the Ninth Circuit stated the judge had no legal basis to reject a settlement the parties had entered into and expressed concern about how Jones conducted the proceedings.

== Personal life ==
Jones is married to Michele Bunker and is a member of the Church of Jesus Christ of Latter-day Saints and has served in several positions in the church including bishop. He was a missionary in Japan from 1966 to 1969.

Legal offices
Preceded by David Warner Hagen	Judge of the United States District Court for the District of Nevada; 2003–2016	Succeeded by Anne Traum
