= Johnnie B. Rawlinson =

American judge (born 1952)

Johnnie Rawlinson
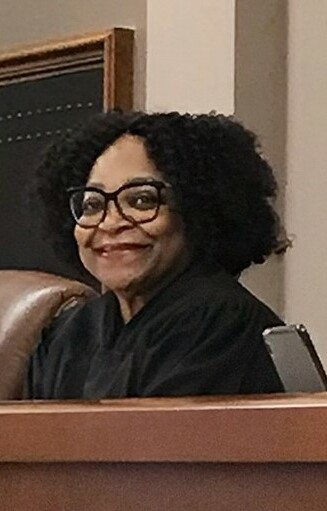

Judge of the United States Court of Appeals for the Ninth Circuit
- Incumbent
- Assumed office July 26, 2000
- Appointed by: Bill Clinton
- Preceded by: Melvin T. Brunetti

Judge of the United States District Court for the District of Nevada
- In office April 7, 1998 – July 26, 2000
- Appointed by: Bill Clinton
- Preceded by: Lloyd D. George
- Succeeded by: Larry R. Hicks

Personal details
- Born: Johnnie Mae Blakeney; December 16, 1952 (age 72) Concord, North Carolina, U.S.
- Education: North Carolina A&T State University (BS); University of the Pacific (JD); Duke University (LLM)

Johnnie Mae Blakeney Rawlinson (born December 16, 1952) is a United States circuit judge of the United States Court of Appeals for the Ninth Circuit and a former United States district judge of the United States District Court for the District of Nevada.

== Early life and career ==
Rawlinson was born in Concord, North Carolina. Rawlinson received most of her education in North Carolina, where she earned her Bachelor of Science degree summa cum laude from North Carolina Agricultural and Technical State University in 1974. She graduated with distinction from the McGeorge School of Law at the University of the Pacific, receiving her Juris Doctor in 1979. In 1980, Rawlinson and Viveca Monet Woods became the first African American women admitted to practice law in Nevada.

She had served as deputy district attorney and chief deputy for over 17 years in the office of the Clark County District Attorney in Las Vegas, Nevada, as well as receiving law practice as a clerk at Kiefer Clark & O'Reilly and other legal services throughout the United States prior to her appointments. She served as a United States district judge after being nominated by President Clinton and confirmed by the United States Senate in 1997. She was the first female judge to serve on the United States District Court for the District of Nevada.

In 2016, Judge Rawlinson received a Master of Judicial Studies degree from Duke University School of Law.

== Federal judicial service ==
=== District court service ===
Rawlinson was a federal judge to the United States District Court for the District of Nevada. Rawlinson was nominated by President Bill Clinton on January 27, 1998, to a seat vacated by Lloyd D. George. She was confirmed by the United States Senate on April 2, 1998, and received commission on April 7, 1998. Rawlinson's service was terminated on July 26, 2000, due to elevation to the court of appeals.

=== Court of appeals service ===
Rawlinson was nominated by President Bill Clinton on February 22, 2000, to a seat on the United States Court of Appeals for the Ninth Circuit after being recommended for the post by United States Senator Harry Reid. Rawlinson was nominated to a seat vacated by Melvin T. Brunetti. Rawlinson was confirmed by the United States Senate by a voice vote on July 21, 2000, making her the final appeals-court nominee to be confirmed during Clinton's presidency. She received her commission on July 26, 2000. Rawlinson subsequently took the oath of office on the same day, becoming the first African American woman to sit on the Ninth Circuit.

On April 14, 2022, news reports stated Rawlinson suggested she would consider assuming senior status, creating a vacancy for her seat on the United States Court of Appeals for the Ninth Circuit, if Berna Rhodes-Ford, former law clerk and wife of Aaron D. Ford, would be nominated as her successor.

== Personal life ==
Rawlinson resides in Las Vegas. Her husband of 40 years, Dwight Rawlinson, died of cancer in August 2016.

== See also ==
- Barack Obama Supreme Court candidates
- List of African-American federal judges
- List of African-American jurists
- List of first women lawyers and judges in Nevada

Legal offices
| Preceded by Lloyd D. George | Judge of the United States District Court for the District of Nevada; 1998–2000 | Succeeded by Larry R. Hicks |
| Preceded by Melvin T. Brunetti | Judge of the United States Court of Appeals for the Ninth Circuit; 2000–present | Incumbent |
