= Catherine Cortez Masto =

American lawyer and politician (born 1964)

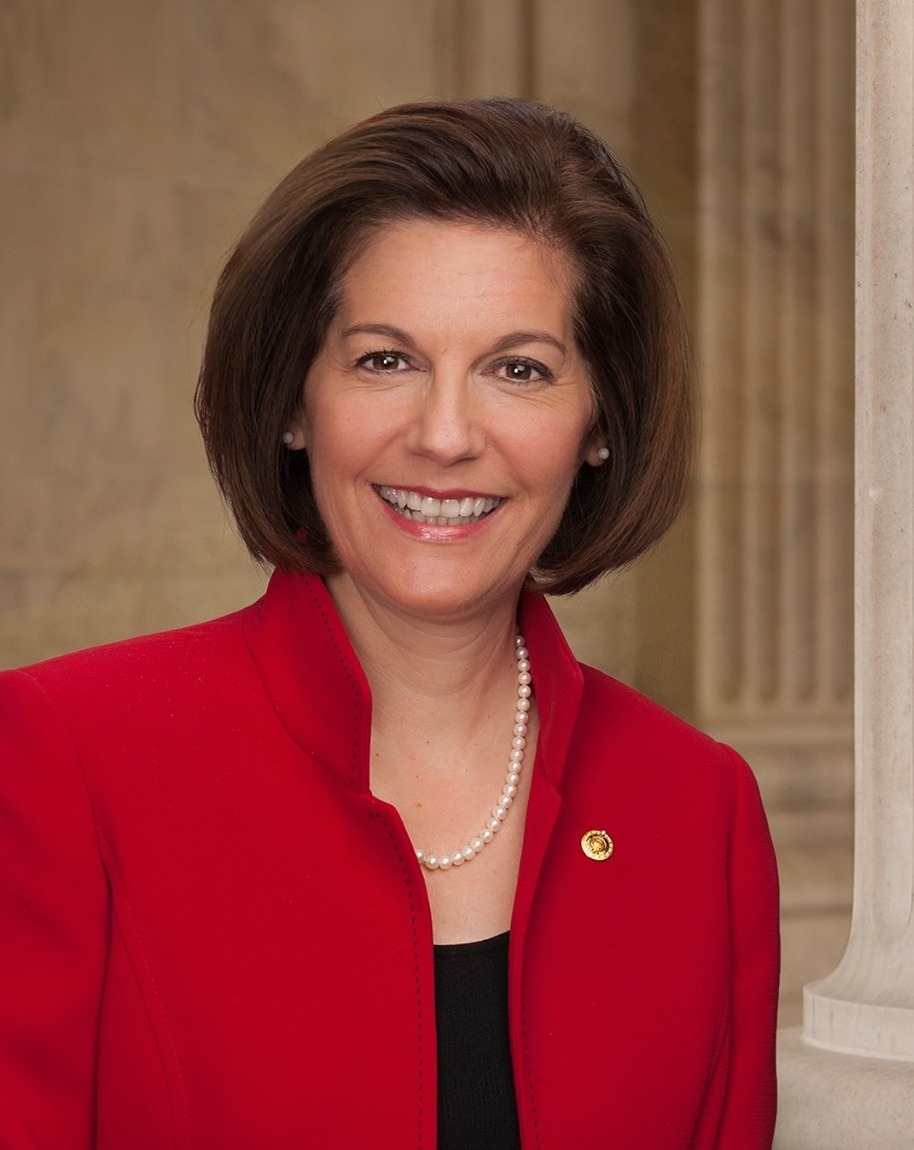
- Official portrait, 2022

United States Senator from Nevada
- Incumbent
- Assumed office January 3, 2017 Serving with Jacky Rosen
- Preceded by: Harry Reid

Chair of the Democratic Senatorial Campaign Committee
- In office January 3, 2019 – January 28, 2021
- Leader: Chuck Schumer
- Preceded by: Chris Van Hollen
- Succeeded by: Gary Peters

32nd Attorney General of Nevada
- In office January 1, 2007 – January 5, 2015
- Governor: Jim Gibbons; Brian Sandoval
- Preceded by: George Chanos
- Succeeded by: Adam Laxalt

Personal details
- Born: Catherine Marie Cortez; March 29, 1964 (age 62) Las Vegas, Nevada, U.S.
- Party: Democratic
- Spouse: Paul Masto
- Education: University of Nevada, Reno (BS); Gonzaga University (JD)
- Website: Senate website Campaign website
- Cortez Masto's voice Cortez Masto questions witnesses on nuclear waste disposal Recorded December 1, 2022

Catherine Marie Cortez Masto (Note: Pronounced /ˈkɔːrtɛz ˈmæstoʊ/ KOR-tehz MAS-toh.) (born March 29, 1964) is an American lawyer and politician serving as the senior United States senator from Nevada, a seat she has held since 2017. A member of the Democratic Party, Cortez Masto served as the 32nd attorney general of Nevada from 2007 to 2015.

Cortez Masto graduated from the University of Nevada, Reno and Gonzaga University School of Law. She worked for four years as a civil attorney in Las Vegas and two years as a criminal prosecutor for the U.S. Attorney's Office in Washington, D.C. before being elected Nevada attorney general in 2006, replacing George Chanos. Reelected in 2010, she was not eligible to run for a third term in 2014 because of lifetime term limits established by the Constitution of Nevada.

Cortez Masto narrowly defeated Republican Joe Heck in the 2016 United States Senate election in Nevada to replace outgoing Democratic senator Harry Reid, becoming the first woman elected to represent Nevada in the Senate and the first Latina elected to serve in the upper chamber. She took office on January 3, 2017, and became Nevada's senior senator in January 2019, when Dean Heller left the Senate following his defeat. She was narrowly reelected in 2022, defeating Republican nominee Adam Laxalt.

== Early life and education ==
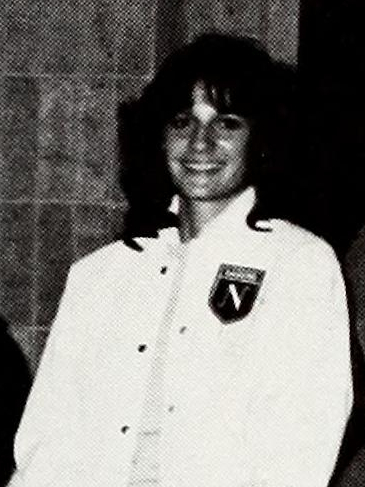
Cortez Masto in the University of Nevada, Reno yearbook, 1985

Cortez Masto was born in Las Vegas, Nevada, the daughter of Joanna (née Musso) and Manny Cortez. Her father was the longtime head of the Las Vegas Convention and Visitors Authority and served as a member of the Clark County Commission. Now deceased, Manny Cortez had a long-standing friendship with Harry Reid. Her father was of Mexican descent, and her mother is of Italian ancestry. Her paternal grandfather, Eduardo Cortez, immigrated to Nevada from Chihuahua, Mexico.

Cortez Masto attended Ed W. Clark High School, and graduated in 1986 with a Bachelor of Science degree in finance from the University of Nevada, Reno, where she was a first-generation college student. In 1990, she earned a Juris Doctor from Gonzaga University School of Law.

== Early career ==
Cortez Masto was admitted to the State Bar of Nevada in 1990, the U.S. District Court, the District of Nevada in 1991, and the U.S. Court of Appeals for the Ninth Circuit in 1994. Her career includes four years as a civil attorney in Las Vegas and two as a criminal prosecutor for the U.S. Attorney's Office in Washington, D.C. She also served as former Nevada Governor Bob Miller's chief of staff.

In November 2003, Cortez Masto was named executive vice chancellor of the Nevada System of Higher Education. There was some controversy, because she was hired directly by the chancellor, not the university system's board of regents; the chancellor said the regents had recommended that he hire an assistant, and in December the board voted unanimously to approve her annual salary of $215,000.

=== Nevada Attorney General ===
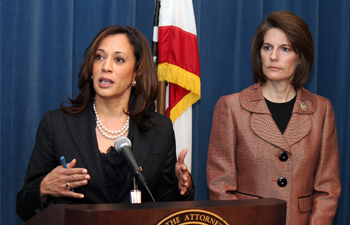
Cortez Masto with then-California Attorney General (and later Senate colleague and vice president) Kamala Harris in December 2011

Cortez Masto was the Democratic nominee for state attorney general in 2006 and defeated Republican nominee Don Chairez 59% to 36%, with 5% for "None of these". She was reelected in 2010, defeating Republican Travis Barrick 52% to 36%, with 8% for Independent American candidate Joel F. Hansen and 4% for "None of these".

In 2009, Cortez Masto's office launched an investigation into Brian Krolicki, then Nevada's Republican lieutenant governor. Krolicki faced felony charges related to allegations that he mishandled the Nevada College Savings Trust Fund when he was state treasurer. During the investigation, the Las Vegas Review-Journal discovered that Cortez Masto's husband, Paul, planned to host a fundraising party for Robert S. Randazzo, a Democratic candidate for lieutenant governor, four days before the attorney general's office was scheduled to prosecute Krolicki. Cortez Masto said she was unaware of the fundraising party. The charges against Krolicki were ultimately dismissed in Clark County District Court. The dismissal of charges against Krolicki was regarded as a political setback for Cortez Masto, who, according to the Las Vegas Sun, "opened herself to charges of politicizing her office and prosecutorial misconduct".

In 2010, Cortez Masto's office began investigating Bank of America, accusing the company of raising interest rates on troubled borrowers. Her office sought to end Nevada's participation in a loan modification settlement in order to sue the bank over deceptive marketing and lending practices. Bank of America denied any wrongdoing. The lawsuit was settled in 2012 for $750 million for lien reductions and short sales.

Cortez Masto defended the state of Nevada in the lawsuit Sevcik v. Sandoval. The suit challenged Nevada's denial of same-sex marriage, as prohibited by the state's constitution and statutory law. After initially defending the same-sex marriage ban, Cortez Masto and the state abandoned their defense in light of a ruling by the United States Court of Appeals for the Ninth Circuit.

== U.S. Senate ==
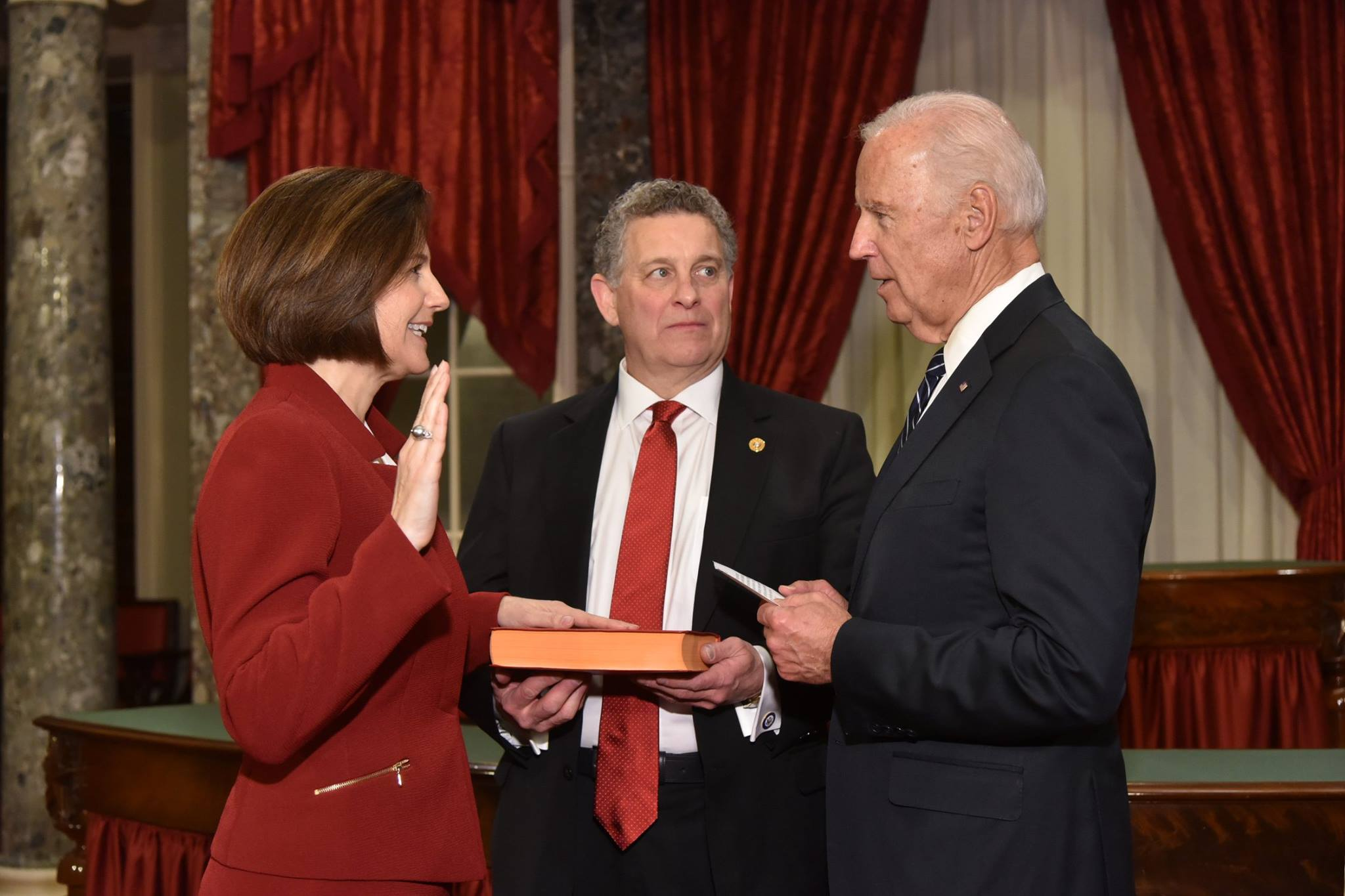
Cortez Masto being sworn in as a U.S. senator by Vice President Joe Biden

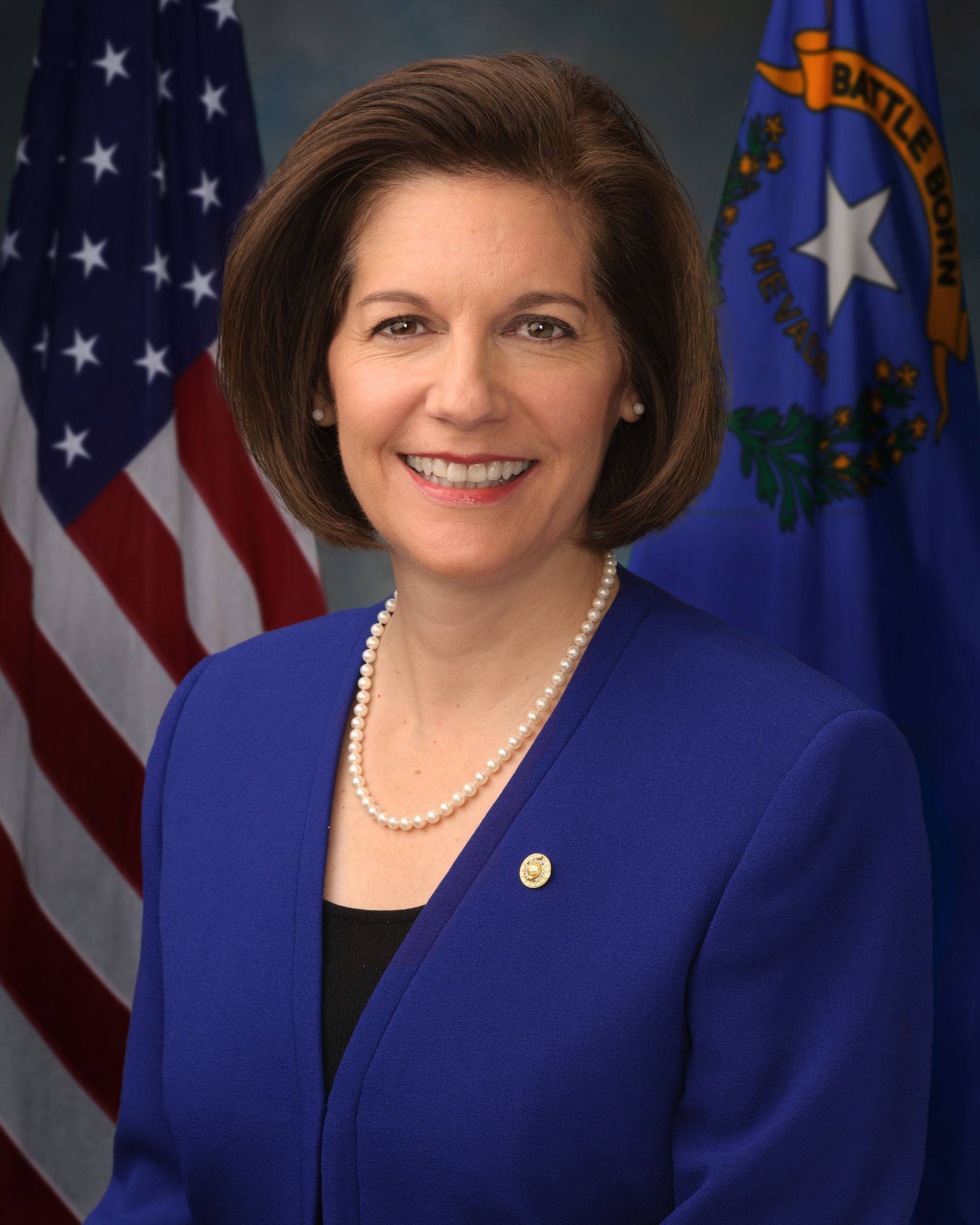
Cortez Masto during the 115th Congress

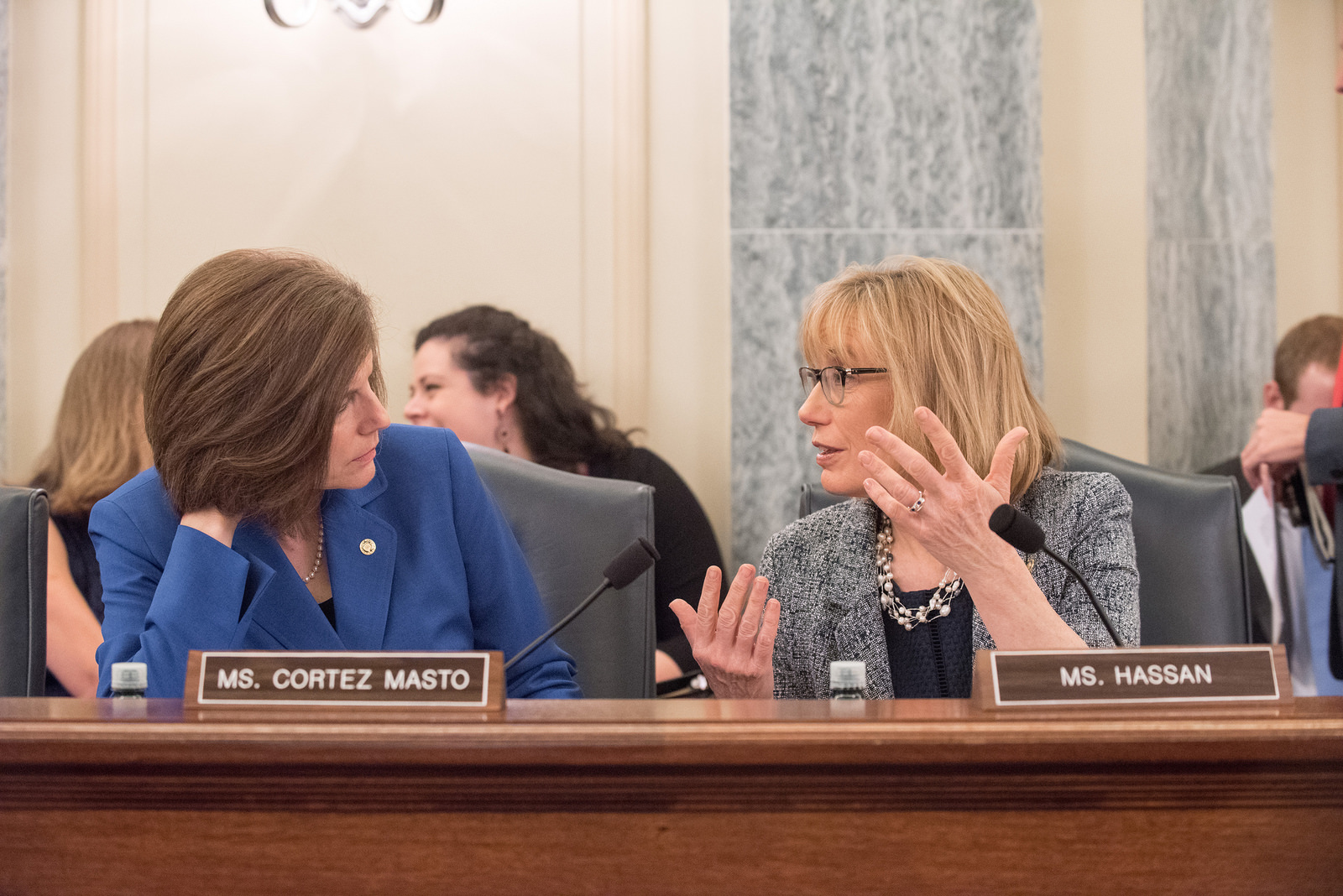
Maggie Hassan speaking with Cortez Masto at a Senate committee hearing in June 2017

=== Elections ===
==== 2016 ====
Cortez Masto declined to run for governor of Nevada in the 2014 election. When U.S. Senator Harry Reid decided not to run for reelection in the 2016 election, he endorsed her as his successor. Cortez Masto's campaign relied heavily on the political infrastructure Reid had assembled. Her Republican opponent was U.S. Representative Joe Heck.

Cortez Masto, who supports increased investments in renewable energy technology, was supported by the League of Conservation Voters. She was also financially supported by pro-choice groups, such as EMILY's List and Planned Parenthood, and by End Citizens United, a political action committee seeking to overturn Citizens United v. FEC.

Cortez Masto won 47% of the vote (520,658 votes) to Heck's 45% (494,427 votes). While Heck carried 16 of Nevada's counties and its equivalents, Cortez Masto won Clark County, home to over 70% of the state's population, by over 82,000 votes, over three times her statewide margin of 27,000 votes. She took office on January 3, 2017, becoming the first Latina in the U.S. Senate.

==== 2022 ====
On February 24, 2021, Cortez Masto announced that she would run for reelection in 2022. Among her challengers was her successor as attorney general and 2018 nominee for governor Adam Laxalt. Cortez Masto trailed in many polls and was widely seen as the most vulnerable incumbent Democratic U.S. senator. But she narrowly defeated Laxalt, securing a second term.

=== Tenure ===
Cortez Masto was participating in the certification of the 2021 United States Electoral College vote count when Trump supporters stormed the U.S. Capitol. She was on the Senate floor, preparing to speak, when the Capitol was breached. Cortez Masto could hear the attackers just outside the chamber, which was secured by Capitol Police. As the attackers neared the chamber, she and her fellow senators were moved to an undisclosed secure location. Cortez Masto tweeted while sheltering in place, calling the attack "un-American and unacceptable".

=== 119th United States Congress Committee assignments ===
- Committee on Banking, Housing, and Urban Affairs
  - Subcommittee on National Security and International Trade and Finance
  - Subcommittee on Financial Institutions and Consumer Protection (ranking member)
  - Subcommittee on Securities, Insurance, and Investment
- Committee on Energy and Natural Resources
- Committee on Indian Affairs
- Committee on Finance

=== Caucus memberships ===
- Congressional Asian Pacific American Caucus
- Congressional Hispanic Caucus
- Congressional Caucus for Women's Issues

=== Nomination of Adeel Mangi to Federal Appeals Court and appointment of Emil Bove to the same vacancy ===
In March 2024, Cortez Masto announced she would not support President Biden's nomination of Adeel Mangi to the United States Court of Appeals for the Third Circuit, citing his association with the Alliance of Families for Justice, a criminal justice reform group that advocates on behalf of families affected by mass incarceration. His nomination remained blocked, and in November 2024 it was withdrawn, leaving the position open for the incoming Trump administration to fill. After Cortez Masto blocked Mangi's nomination, President Trump appointed Emil Bove, a controversial nominee who was accused of defying court orders and later attended a Trump rally in Pennsylvania shortly after he became a federal judge, to the vacancy. Cortez Masto voted against Bove's nomination, but he was confirmed. Bove's appointment to the position to which Cortez Masto refused to confirm Mangi effectively flipped control of the intermediate federal appellate court that has jurisdiction over all federal court appeals from Pennsylvania, New Jersey, Delaware, and the U.S. Virgin Islands to a conservative majority.

== Political positions ==
Cortez Masto voted in line with Joe Biden's stated position 96% of the time.

=== Cannabis ===
Cortez Masto cosponsored the bipartisan STATES Act proposed in the 115th Congress by senators Elizabeth Warren and Cory Gardner that would exempt individuals or corporations in compliance with state cannabis laws from federal enforcement of the Controlled Substances Act.

=== Environment ===
Cortez Masto recognizes the existence of human-caused climate change and believes that the federal government should limit power plants' greenhouse gas emissions. She supports the growth of green jobs and increasing Nevada's reliance on solar power and other forms of sustainable energy. She opposes the use of Yucca Mountain as a nuclear waste repository. Cortez Masto was a member of the Senate Democrats' Special Committee on the Climate Crisis, which published a report of its findings in August 2020.

=== Filibuster ===
Cortez Masto supports reforming the filibuster of the United States Senate into a talking filibuster.

=== Foreign policy ===
In October 2017, Cortez Masto condemned the genocide of the Rohingya Muslim minority in Myanmar and called for a stronger response to the crisis.

In August 2025, Cortez Masto was one of 23 Democratic senators, a minority of Senate Democrats, who voted to continue arms sales to Israel during the Gaza War/Gaza genocide. In April 2026, she was one of just seven Democratic senators still voting to continue such sales.

=== Gun policy ===
The National Rifle Association Political Victory Fund (NRA-PVF) has given Cortez Masto an "F" grade because of her support for gun control. During the 2016 election, the organization spent $1 million on an attack ad against her. Cortez Masto opposes allowing people on the terrorist watchlist to buy guns, saying that "makes no sense".

In response to the 2017 Las Vegas shooting, she co-sponsored a bill with Dianne Feinstein to ban bump stocks. She said that it can be a start toward decreasing gun violence and mass shootings.

=== Health care ===
Cortez Masto does not support the repeal of the Affordable Care Act (also known as Obamacare). She does support improving upon the act, which she has called "imperfect". She has co-sponsored the Marketplace Certainty Act to bring more stability to the health insurance marketplace.

=== Immigration ===
In June 2019, after the Housing and Urban Development Department confirmed that Deferred Action for Childhood Arrivals (DACA) recipients did not meet eligibility for federal backed loans, Cortez Masto and 11 other senators introduced the Home Ownership Dreamers Act, legislation mandating that the federal government not be authorized to deny mortgage loans backed by the Federal Housing Administration, Fannie Mae, Freddie Mac, or the Agriculture Department solely due to applicants' immigration status.

In July 2019, Cortez Masto was one of 16 Senate Democrats to have introduced the Protecting Sensitive Locations Act, which mandated that Immigration and Customs Enforcement (ICE) agents get a supervisor's approval before engaging in enforcement actions at sensitive locations (except in special circumstances), that agents receive annual training, and that they be required to report annually on enforcement actions at those locations.

In January 2026, after Alex Pretti became the second U.S. citizen to be shot and killed by ICE agents in Minneapolis that month, Cortez Masto announced she would vote against the Department of Homeland Security (DHS) funding bill. Despite having previously been one of eight Senate Democrats who voted to end a government shutdown standoff weeks earlier, Cortez Masto opposed the DHS measure, saying ICE operations in Minnesota were "brutalizing U.S. citizens and law-abiding immigrants" and that the enforcement actions were "clearly not about keeping Americans safe".

=== LGBT rights ===
Cortez Masto supports same-sex marriage.

=== Reproductive rights ===
Cortez Masto supports legalized abortion. In the 2016 election, she was endorsed by Planned Parenthood and funded by their action fund.

She does not believe that companies should be allowed to withhold coverage for birth control based on religious beliefs.

=== Puerto Rico ===
In July 2024, Cortez Masto began working with a committee to plan to sponsor legislation granting Puerto Rico a self-determination referendum with federal repeal.

== Personal life ==
Cortez Masto lives in Las Vegas with her husband, Paul Masto, a retired United States Secret Service special agent. She is Roman Catholic.

== Electoral history ==
2006 Attorney General election in Nevada
Party	Candidate	Votes	%	±%
Democratic	Catherine Cortez Masto	339,465	59.04%	+25.32%
Republican	Don Chairez	204,816	35.62%	−22.85%
None of These Candidates		30,694	5.34%	+1.56%
Total votes			100%	
Democratic gain from Republican				

2010 Attorney General election in Nevada
Party	Candidate	Votes	%	±%
Democratic	Catherine Cortez Masto (incumbent)	372,010	52.89%	−6.15%
Republican	Travis Barrick	251,269	35.73%	+0.14%
Independent	Joel Hansen	54,980	7.67%	
None of These Candidates		26,072	3.71%	-1.63%
Total votes			100%	
Democratic hold				

2016 United States Senate election in Nevada – Democratic primary
Party	Candidate	Votes	%
Democratic	Catherine Cortez Masto	81,944	81.0%
Democratic	Allen Rheinhart	5,645	6.0%
Democratic	None of these candidates	5,498	5.0%
Democratic	Liddo Susan O'Briant	4,834	5.0%
Democratic	Bobby Mahendra	3,760	3.0%
Total votes		101,681	100.0%

2016 United States Senate election in Nevada
Party	Candidate	Votes	%	±%
Democratic	Catherine Cortez Masto	521,994	47.10%	−3.19%
Republican	Joe Heck	495,079	44.67%	+0.12%
n/a	None of these Candidates	42,257	3.81%	+1.56%
Independent American	Tom Jones	17,128	1.55%	+1.11%
Independent	Thomas Sawyer	14,208	1.28%	N/A
Independent	Tony Gumina	10,740	0.97%	N/A
Independent	Jarrod Williams	6,888	0.62%	N/A
Total votes		1,108,294	100.0%	N/A
Democratic hold				

2022 United States Senate election in Nevada
Party	Candidate	Votes	%	±%
Democratic	Catherine Cortez Masto (incumbent)	498,316	48.81%	+1.71%
Republican	Adam Laxalt	490,388	48.04%	+3.37%
None of These Candidates		12,441	1.22%	-2.59%
Independent	Barry Lindemann	8,075	0.79%	N/A
Libertarian	Neil Scott	6,422	0.63%	N/A
Independent American	Barry Rubinson	5,208	0.51%	−1.04%
Total votes		1,020,850	100.0%	
Democratic hold				

== See also ==
- List of female state attorneys general in the United States
- List of Hispanic and Latino Americans in the United States Congress
- Women in the United States Senate

== Notes ==
Legal offices
Preceded by George Chanos	Attorney General of Nevada; 2007–2015	Succeeded by Adam Laxalt
Party political offices
Preceded by Harry Reid	Democratic nominee for U.S. Senator from Nevada (Class 3); 2016, 2022	Most recent
Preceded by Chris Van Hollen	Chair of the Democratic Senatorial Campaign Committee; 2019–2021	Succeeded by Gary Peters
U.S. Senate
Preceded by Harry Reid	United States Senator (Class 3) from Nevada; 2017–present Served alongside: Dean Heller, Jacky Rosen	Incumbent
U.S. order of precedence (ceremonial)
Preceded by Tammy Duckworth	Order of precedence of the United States as United States Senator	Succeeded by Tina Smith
Preceded by John N. Kennedy	United States senators by seniority 61st	Succeeded by Tina Smith
