= Melvin T. Brunetti =

American judge (1933–2009)

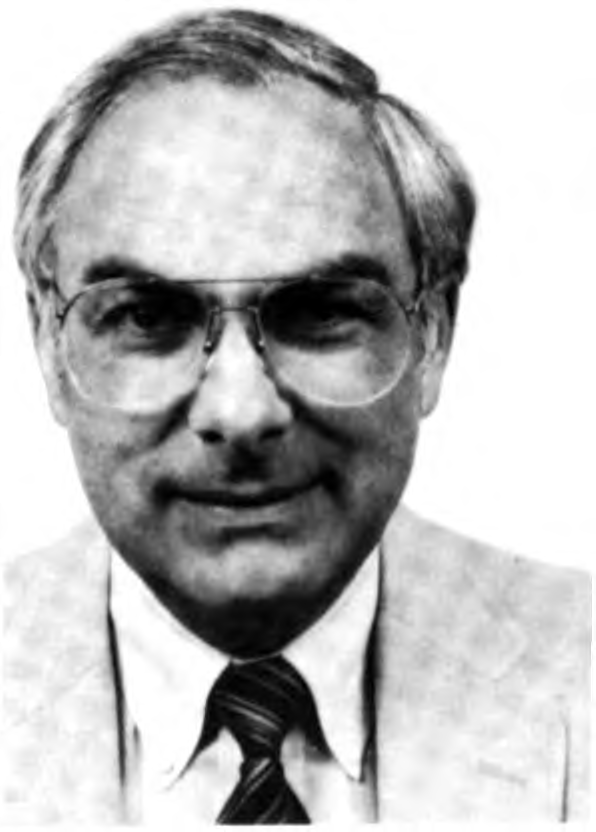

Senior Judge of the United States Court of Appeals for the Ninth Circuit
- In office November 11, 1999 – October 30, 2009

Judge of the United States Court of Appeals for the Ninth Circuit
- In office April 4, 1985 – November 11, 1999
- Appointed by: Ronald Reagan
- Preceded by: Herbert Choy
- Succeeded by: Johnnie B. Rawlinson

Personal details
- Born: Melvin Theodore Brunetti; November 10, 1933 Reno, Nevada
- Died: October 30, 2009 (aged 75) Reno, Nevada
- Education: University of California, Hastings; College of the Law (JD)

Melvin Theodore Brunetti (November 11, 1933 – October 30, 2009) was a United States circuit judge of the United States Court of Appeals for the Ninth Circuit.

== Education and career ==
He was born in Reno, Nevada, and graduated from Sparks High School, where he played the clarinet. He served in the Nevada National Guard from 1954 to 1956 where he became a sergeant. He attended University of Nevada, Reno and received a Juris Doctor from the University of California, Hastings College of Law in 1964. He was in private practice in Reno from 1964 to 1985. He was a member of the Council of Legal Advisors to the Republican National Committee from 1982 to 1985.

== Federal judicial service ==
On February 26, 1985, Brunetti was nominated by President Ronald Reagan to a seat on the United States Court of Appeals for the Ninth Circuit vacated by Judge Herbert Choy. Brunetti was confirmed by the United States Senate on April 3, 1985, and received his commission on April 4, 1985. He assumed senior status on November 11, 1999.

== Death ==
Brunetti died on October 30, 2009, in Reno.

== Notable cases ==
Brunetti's notable cases include:

- Osborne v. District Attorney's Office for the Third Judicial District, 423 F.3d 1050 (9th Cir. 2005), after remand, 521 F.3d 1118 (9th Cir. 2008), reversed, 129 S. Ct. 2308 (2009). Brunetti held that an Alaska inmate's section 1983 action for post-conviction access to DNA evidence was not barred by Heck v. Humphrey, 512 U.S. 477 (1994), and, after remand, that due process conferred a right of access to the evidence. The Supreme Court later reversed 5-4 on the due process issue;
- Harris v. Vasquez, 949 F.2d 1497 (9th Cir. 1990). Brunetti upheld the murder conviction and death sentence of Robert Alton Harris on habeas review; and
- Adamson v. Ricketts, 789 F.2d 722, 735 (9th Cir. 1986) (en banc) (dissenting), reversed, 483 U.S. 1 (1987). Dissenting from the en banc majority, Brunetti wrote that double jeopardy did not bar the defendant's prosecution for first degree murder in connection with a bombing in Phoenix, Arizona. The Supreme Court subsequently reversed the majority opinion.

== Sources ==
Legal offices
Preceded by Herbert Choy	Judge of the United States Court of Appeals for the Ninth Circuit; 1985–1999	Succeeded by Johnnie B. Rawlinson
