= Notable Quotables =

Board game

Notable Quotables is a board game based on the idea of identifying quotations by famous people, created by George Chanos on December 28, 1990.

Inspired by and similar to Trivial Pursuit, the goal of the game is to acquire a token in each category of questions. Questions are asked in a multiple-choice format, with the option for the player to either determine who said a particular quote or fill in the missing word in the quote.

The game was produced by GameMakers Ltd., a company started by Chanos for the purpose of marketing the game.
