= List of first minority male lawyers and judges in Nevada =

This is a list of the first minority male lawyer(s) and judge(s) in Nevada. It includes the year in which the men were admitted to practice law (in parentheses). Also included are men who achieved other distinctions, such becoming the first in their state to graduate from law school or become a political figure.

== Firsts in Nevada's history ==
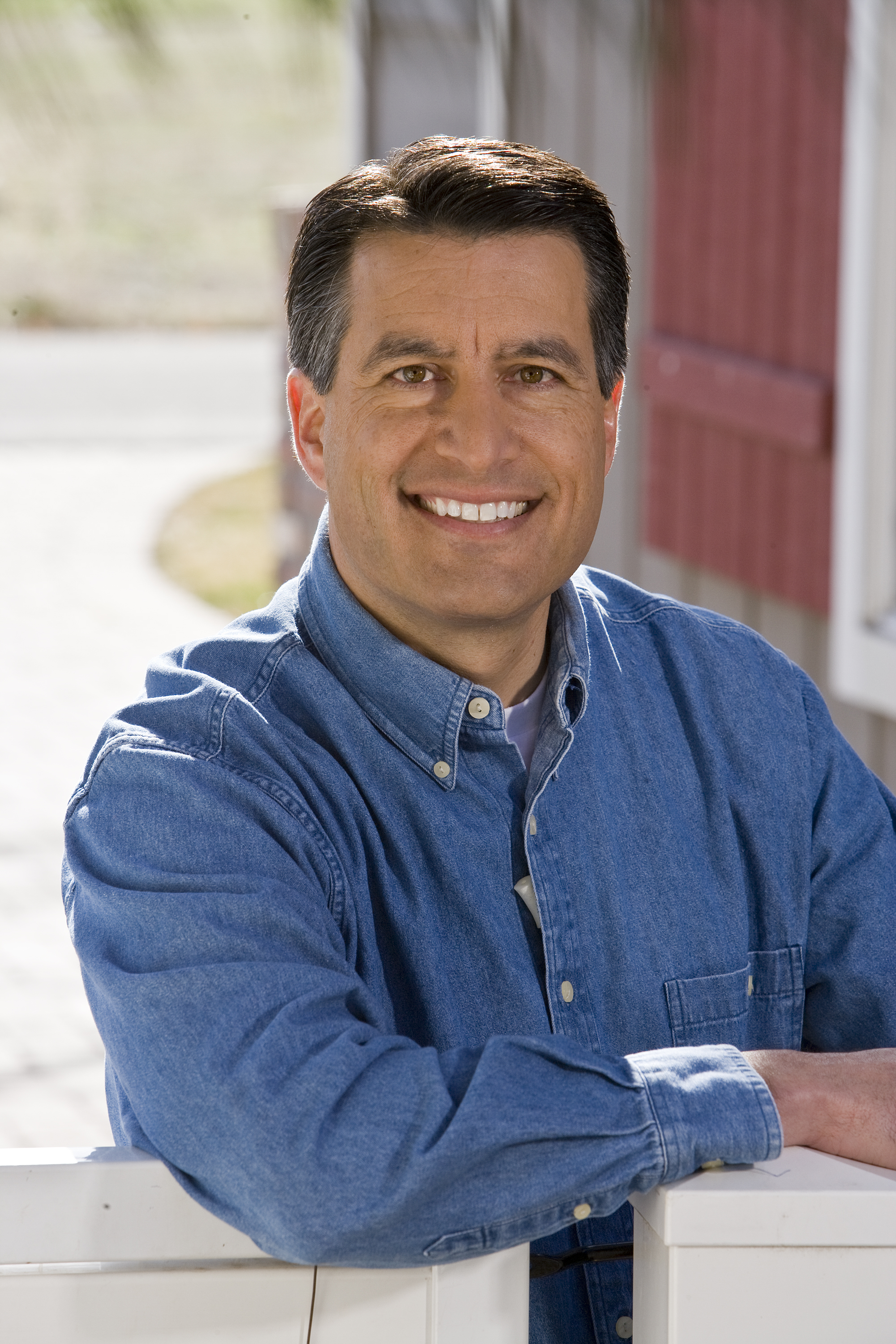
Brian Sandoval: First Hispanic American male to become a federal judge in Nevada (2005-2009)

=== Lawyers ===
- First Hispanic American male: John F. Mendoza (1951)
- First African American males: Earle W. White Jr. and Robert L. Reid (1964)

=== State judges ===
- First Hispanic American male (justice of the peace): John F. Mendoza (1951) from 1955-1957
- First African American male: Robert L. Reid (1964) in 1966
- First Hispanic American male (district court): John F. Mendoza (1951) in 1966
- First African American (district court): Addeliar Dell Guy (1957) in 1975
- First African American male (elected judge; non-attorney): Robert E. “Moon” Mullen in 1969
- First Filipino American male (municipal court judge): Cedric Kerns in 1997
- First African American male (Nevada Supreme Court): Michael L. Douglas (1974) in 2004
- First Asian American male: Jerome "Jerry" Tao (1992) in 2011
- First African American male (Chief Justice; Nevada Supreme Court): Michael L. Douglas (1974) in 2011

=== Federal judges ===
- First Hispanic American male: Brian Sandoval (1989) from 2005-2009

=== Attorney General of Nevada ===
- First Hispanic American male: Brian Sandoval (1989) from 2003-2005
- First African American male: Aaron D. Ford in 2019

=== Deputy Attorney General ===
- First Latino American male: Vincent Ochoa in 1982

=== United States Attorney ===
- First African American male: Jason Frierson in 2022

=== Deputy District Attorney ===
- First Hispanic American male: John F. Mendoza (1951) from 1951-1955
- First African American male: Addeliar Dell Guy (1957) in 1966

=== Nevada State Bar Association ===
- First African American male (pass Nevada bar exam): Charles Kellar (1961)
- First African American male (president): Bryan K. Scott (1991) from 2016-2017

== Firsts in local history ==
- Addeliar Dell Guy (1957): First African American male to serve as a Deputy District Attorney in Clark County, Nevada (1966) and Judge of the Eighth Judicial District Court, Dept. XI (1975)
- John F. Mendoza (1951): First Hispanic American male to serve as a Justice of the Peace (1955-1957) for the Las Vegas Township, City Attorney for North Las Vegas (1958-1959) and District Attorney (1960) for Clark County, Nevada
- Bryan K. Scott (1991): First African American male to serve as the President of the Clark County Bar Association, Nevada. In 2020, Scott became the first African American male to serve as the City Attorney of Las Vegas.
- Fidel Salcedo: First Latino American male to serve as a Justice of the Peace in Reno, Nevada [Washoe County, Nevada]
- David Dean (1974): First African American male lawyer in Reno, Nevada [Washoe County, Nevada]
- Kenneth R. Howard: First African American male to serve as a Judge of the Reno Municipal Court (1999) [Washoe County, Nevada]

== See also ==
- List of first minority male lawyers and judges in the United States

== Other topics of interest ==
- List of first women lawyers and judges in the United States
- List of first women lawyers and judges in Nevada
