= Roger L. Hunt =

American judge (born 1942)

Senior Judge of the United States District Court for the District of Nevada
- Incumbent
- Assumed office May 26, 2011

Chief Judge of the United States District Court for the District of Nevada
- In office 2007–2011
- Preceded by: Philip Martin Pro
- Succeeded by: Robert Clive Jones

Judge of the United States District Court for the District of Nevada
- In office May 25, 2000 – May 26, 2011
- Appointed by: Bill Clinton
- Preceded by: Seat established by 113 Stat. 1501
- Succeeded by: Miranda Du

Magistrate Judge of the United States District Court for the District of Nevada
- In office 1992–2000

Personal details
- Born: April 29, 1942 (age 83) Overton, Nevada, U.S.
- Education: Brigham Young University (BA); George Washington University Law School (JD)

Roger Lee Hunt (born April 29, 1942) is an inactive senior United States district judge of the United States District Court for the District of Nevada.

== Education and career ==
Born in Overton, Nevada, Hunt received a Bachelor of Arts degree from Brigham Young University in 1966 and a Juris Doctor from the George Washington University Law School in 1970. He was a deputy district attorney at the Clark County District Attorney's Office from 1970 to 1971. He was in private practice in Las Vegas Valley, Nevada from 1971 to 1992.

== Federal judicial service ==
Hunt serves on the United States District Court for the District of Nevada. Hunt was nominated by President Bill Clinton on March 27, 2000, to a new seat created by 113 Stat. 1501. He was confirmed by the United States Senate on May 24, 2000, and received his commission the next day. He served as Chief Judge from 2007 to 2011. Prior to his appointment, he had been a United States magistrate judge on that court from 1992 to 2000. Hunt took senior status on May 26, 2011. He was succeeded by Miranda Du.

== Religion ==
Hunt is a member of the Church of Jesus Christ of Latter-day Saints. He has also served as a stake president.

== Sources ==
- LDS Church Almanac, 2008 Edition, p. 246-247.

Legal offices
Preceded by Seat established by 113 Stat. 1501	Judge of the United States District Court for the District of Nevada; 2000–2011	Succeeded by Miranda Du
Preceded by Philip Martin Pro	Chief Judge of the United States District Court for the District of Nevada; 2007–2011	Succeeded by Robert Clive Jones
