= Marc Johnson (academic) =

American agricultural economist and academic administrator

16th President of the University of Nevada, Reno
- In office April 16, 2011 – October 5, 2020
- Preceded by: Milton Glick
- Succeeded by: Brian Sandoval

Personal details
- Born: Marc Anton Johnson; June 20, 1948 (age 77) Wichita, Kansas, U.S.
- Party: Independent (2008–present)
- Education: Emporia State University (BS); North Carolina State University (MS); Michigan State University (M.Ec, PhD)

Marc Anton Johnson (born June 20, 1948) is an American agricultural economist and academic administrator. He became the 16th president of the University of Nevada, Reno on April 16, 2011, after his predecessor Milton Glick died while in office.

== Early life and education ==
Johnson was raised on a family farm near Wichita, Kansas. He earned a bachelor's degree in biology from Emporia State University, Master of Technology in International Development from North Carolina State University, Master of Economics from Michigan State University, and a Ph.D. in Agricultural Economics from Michigan State University.

== Career ==
Johnson served as dean of the Colorado State University College of Agricultural Sciences and Kansas State University College of Agriculture. Johnson joined the faculty of the University of Nevada, Reno in June 2008 as vice president and provost.

On October 31, 2019, it was announced that Johnson step down as president on June 30, 2020, and transition to a position in the UNR College of Business. However, it was delayed until Brian Sandoval succeeded him as president on October 5, 2020.

Academic offices
Preceded by Milton Glick	President of the University of Nevada, Reno; April 16, 2011 – October 5, 2020	Succeeded by Brian Sandoval
