= George Chanos =

American politician (born 1958)

31st Attorney General of Nevada
- In office October 26, 2005 – January 1, 2007
- Governor: Kenny Guinn
- Preceded by: Brian Sandoval
- Succeeded by: Catherine Cortez Masto

Personal details
- Born: George James Chanos; August 3, 1958 (age 67) Wauwatosa, Wisconsin, U.S.
- Party: Independent (2016–present)
- Other political affiliations: Republican (1996–2016)
- Education: University of Nevada, Las Vegas (BA); University of San Diego (JD)

George James Chanos (born August 3, 1958) is an American attorney and politician who served as the 31st Nevada Attorney General from 2005 to 2007.

== Early life and education ==
Chanos was born in Wauwatosa, Wisconsin. He earned a bachelor's degree from the University of Nevada, Las Vegas in 1981 and a Juris Doctor from the University of San Diego School of Law in 1985.

== Career ==
As an undergraduate, Chanos worked as an intern in the U.S. Senate office on Paul Laxalt. After graduating from law school, Chanos worked as an attorney at Finley, Kumble, Wagner, Heine, Underberg, Manley, Myerson & Casey in San Diego.

Chanos was appointed by Governor Kenny Guinn on October 26, 2005 as Nevada's Attorney General to fill out the term of his predecessor, Brian Sandoval, who became a federal district judge. He also created a moderately successful trivia board game known as Notable Quotables on December 28, 1990. He was a member of the Republican Party.

On December 26, 2012, Chanos wrote an article on The Huffington Post, advocating for limits on the sale of military style assault weapons via gun control.

== Personal life ==
Chanos is married with one daughter. Chanos is of Greek ancestry.

Legal offices
Preceded by Brian Sandoval	Attorney General of Nevada; October 26, 2005 – January 1, 2007	Succeeded by Catherine Cortez Masto
