= Milton Glick =

American educator, researcher and academic administrator (1937–2011)

15th President of the University of Nevada, Reno
- In office 2006 – April 16, 2011
- Preceded by: Joseph N. Crowley (interim)
- Succeeded by: Marc Johnson

Personal details
- Born: Milton Don Glick; July 30, 1937 Memphis, Tennessee, U.S.
- Died: April 16, 2011 (aged 73) Reno, Nevada, U.S.
- Cause of death: Stroke
- Spouse: Peggy Porter (m. 1965)
- Children: 2, David and Sandy
- Education: Augustana College (Illinois); Cornell University; University of Wisconsin–Madison

Milton Don Glick (July 30, 1937 – April 16, 2011) was an American educator, researcher and academic administrator who served as 15th president of the University of Nevada, Reno from 2006 until his death on April 16, 2011.

== Education ==
Glick was born in Memphis, Tennessee, to parents Lewis Glick and Sylvia Kleinman Glick. He studied chemistry at Augustana College (Illinois) in Rock Island, Illinois and received his bachelor's degree in 1959. He earned his doctorate in chemistry from the University of Wisconsin–Madison in 1965. He completed his academic trainings with two years of post-doctoral studies at Cornell University.

== Career ==
=== Wayne State University 1967–1983 ===
He joined Wayne State University chemistry faculty in 1967, became an expert in the field of X-ray crystallography, and published 99 research articles during his time at Wayne State. He remained at Wayne State for 17 years and served as chair of the department of chemistry in his last five years.

=== University of Missouri and Iowa State University era ===
He was dean of the College of Arts and Science at the University of Missouri from 1983 to 1988 and was responsible for many advances, including a writing-across-the-curriculum program that became a model for other universities. From 1988 to 1991, he served as provost at Iowa State University and as interim president for the final eight months.

=== Arizona State University 1991–2006 ===
He served as senior vice president in 1991, and then as executive vice president and provost at Arizona State University (ASU). During his 15 year-tenure with ASU, the school experienced unprecedented success, with a doubling number of minorities enrollment, a 20-percent improvement in freshman retention rate, and a 15-percent improvement in graduation rate. Funding for sponsored research tripled, and ASU recruited 10 faculty with prestigious national academy memberships, and one Nobel Laureate. The number of National Merit Scholars rose from about a dozen to more than 500 and the Tempe campus became the largest in the United States in terms of enrollment.

=== University of Nevada, Reno 2006–2011 ===
Glick was appointed as the 15th president of University of Nevada, Reno in 2006. During his five-year tenure as president, he strengthened the university in the areas ranging from student success to research capacity to campus expansion, and set all-time records in enrollment and graduation. Freshman retention rates reached 80 percent and the number of National Merit Scholars increased from a handful to 38 during the 2010–2011 academic year. All these efforts led the institution being named a Tier I school in U.S. News & World Report's annual rankings for the first time in the university's history in 2010.

Academic offices
Preceded by Joseph N. Crowley (interim)	President of the University of Nevada, Reno; 2006 – April 16, 2011	Succeeded by Marc Johnson
