= Joseph N. Crowley =

President of the University of Nevada, Reno (1978–2001)

Acting President of the University of Nevada, Reno
- In office December 2005 – June 2006
- Preceded by: John M. Lilley
- Succeeded by: Milton Glick

24th President of San José State University (Interim)
- In office 2003–2004
- Preceded by: Robert L. Caret
- Succeeded by: Paul Yu

13th President of the University of Nevada, Reno
- In office February 24, 1978 – January 2001
- Preceded by: Max C. Milam
- Succeeded by: Stephen C. McFarlane (interim)

Personal details
- Born: Joseph Neil Crowley; July 9, 1933 Oelwein, Iowa, U.S.
- Died: November 28, 2017 (aged 84) Reno, Nevada, U.S.
- Party: Democratic (1968–2017)
- Spouse: Joy Reitz (m. 1961)
- Children: 4
- Education: California State University, Fresno (M.A.); University of Iowa (B.A.); University of Maryland, College Park; University of Washington (Ph.D.)

Military service
- Allegiance: United States
- Branch/service: United States Air Force

Joseph Neil Crowley (July 9, 1933 – November 28, 2017) was the 13th president of the University of Nevada, Reno from 1978 to 2001 and interim president from 2005 to 2006 and was the longest-serving president at the university and cannabis advocate. He was a member of the Democratic Party.

== Early life and education ==
Crowley was born in Oelwein, Iowa. He enlisted and served in the United States Air Force for four years, attending an overseas program of the University of Maryland, College Park during that time. Upon his discharge from the military, Crowley studied political science at University of Iowa, earning his BA in 1959. In 1961, Crowley married Joy Reitz, and together they had four children. He received a MA in political science from California State University, Fresno. And went on to a Ph.D. in political science from the University of Washington in 1967.

== University of Nevada, Reno ==
Crowley came to the University of Nevada, Reno in 1966, as a one-semester replacement in the political science department. Upon completing his PhD in 1967, he received a full-time contract as a political science professor at the university. He served in the University Faculty Senate from 1972 to 1973. During an academic leave, Crowley became a fellow with the United States Environmental Protection Agency in 1973, and served as the director of institutional studies for the National Commission on Water Quality in 1974.

In 1976, Crowley became department chair for political science and held that position until February 1978. He served as acting University President from February 24, 1978, until March 23, 1979, when he was appointed to the position permanently. He oversaw a dramatic expansion of the institution, both in size of the campus, as well as significant increases in student and faculty numbers. Crowley helped to establish the university foundation, and complete a major capital campaign.

The University of Nevada, Reno School of Medicine was expanded to a statewide institution, with facilities in established in Las Vegas. The university established a new core curriculum, and widely enhanced sponsored faculty research on campus. The university founded both the College of Human and Community Sciences (known today as the Division of Health Sciences) and of the Donald W. Reynolds School of Journalism under Crowley's presidency.

Also during his tenure, Crowley served on the board of directors of the National Association of State Universities and Land Grant Colleges (NASULGC). In 1989 he spent as semester as visiting reader at Brasenose College, Oxford, and chaired the Nevada Rhodes Scholar Committee.

From 1993 to 1995, he was president of National Collegiate Athletic Association and after his presidency there, served as member of its Honors Committee and Minority Opportunities and Interests Committee. In 2006, Crowley authored the book In the Arena: The NCAA's First Century to commemorate the association's centennial. Crowley was also a member of the Collegiate Women's Sports Awards and National Consortium for Academics and Sports.

On May 31, 2000, he announced that he would be stepping down as president.

== Post presidency ==
After leaving the presidency in January 2001, he served during the 2001 Nevada State Legislative Session as the coordinator of legislative activities for the University and Community College System of Nevada, then returned to the faculty as Regents Professor and President Emeritus, teaching American political and constitutional history. From 2003 to 2004 Crowley served as interim president of San Jose State University, and again served as interim president at the University of Nevada, Reno from December 2005 to June 2006.

In 2015, Crowley became president of Sierra Wellness Connection, one of two companies that were awarded Reno's first business licenses for cultivating medical marijuana.

The company operates a cultivation center on Security Circle in Golden Valley and a dispensary in the city of Reno. Crowley became interested in medical marijuana while his brother suffered from multiple sclerosis; his sister used medical marijuana as a pain reliever after undergoing 13 major surgeries.

== Legacy and awards ==
- 1989: Named Outstanding Alumnus of the Year at Fresno State
- 1994: University of Iowa Distinguished Alumni award winner
- 1998: Received Honor of Merit from the National Association of Collegiate Directors of Athletics
- 2007: Joe Crowley Student Union at the University of Nevada, Reno named in his honor
- 2012: Received Iowa's Hancher-Finkbine Alumni Medallion

== Works ==
- Crowley, Joseph N. 1976. Democrats, delegates, and politics in Nevada : a grassroots chronicle of 1972. Reno, NV: Bureau of Governmental Research, University of Nevada.
- Crowley, Joseph N. 1988. Notes from the President's chair: reflections on life in a university. Reno, NV: The University of Nevada-Reno Foundation in cooperation with the University of Nevada Press.
- Crowley, Joseph N. 1994. No Equal in the World: An Interpretation of the Academic Presidency Reno. NV: University of Nevada Press.
- Crowley, Joseph N. 2000. The constant conversation: a chronicle of campus life. Reno, NV: Black Rock Press, University of Nevada, Reno.
- Crowley, Joseph N. 2006. In the arena: the NCAA's first century. Indianapolis, IN: NCAA.

Academic offices
Preceded by Max C. Milam	President of the University of Nevada, Reno; February 24, 1978 – January 2001	Succeeded by Stephen C. McFarlane (interim)
Preceded by John M. Lilley	Acting President of the University of Nevada, Reno; December 2005 – June 2006	Succeeded by Milton Glick
