= John M. Lilley =

President of the University of Nevada, Reno and Baylor University

13th President of Baylor University
- In office 2006–2008
- Preceded by: William D. Underwood (interim)
- Succeeded by: David E. Garland (interim)

14th President of the University of Nevada, Reno
- In office 2001–2005
- Preceded by: Stephen C. McFarlane (interim)
- Succeeded by: Joseph N. Crowley (interim)

Personal details
- Born: John Mark Lilley; March 24, 1939 (age 87) Converse, Louisiana, U.S.
- Party: Democratic (2013–present)
- Education: Harvard Business School; Thornton School of Music

John Mark Lilley (born March 24, 1939) served as the 14th president of the University of Nevada, Reno from 2001 to 2005 and 13th president of Baylor University from 2006 to 2008.

== Biography ==
Lilley was born on March 24, 1939, in Converse, Louisiana. His father was a Baptist pastor. He graduated from Baylor University in the 1960s, and received a doctorate from the University of Southern California (Thornton School of Music, DMA, Church Music) in 1971. He also received a certificate from the Harvard Business School in 1978. From 1966 to 1976, he worked at The Claremont Colleges. From 1976 to 1980, he served as assistant dean of the College of Arts and Sciences at Kansas State University. From 1980 to 2001, he was dean and then provost at Penn State Erie for twenty-one years. He served as the president of the University of Nevada, Reno from 2001 to 2005 and Baylor University from 2006 to 2008. He was fired by the board of regents.

He is a Baptist minister.

He has served on the boards of the Economic Development Authority of Western Nevada, the Reno Philharmonic Orchestra, the Erie Philharmonic, WQLN (TV), WQLN-FM, the Americans for the Competitive Enterprise System, the Northwestern Pennsylvania Industrial Resource Council, the Erie Plastics Corporation, the McMannis Educational Trust, the Erie Conference, the Community Coalition, the Education Collaborative, the American Association of State Colleges and Universities, the Big 12 Conference, and the American Association of Presidents of Independent Colleges and Universities. He is also a corporator of the Hamot Health Systems, Inc and the St. Vincent Health Center. He also served as President of the Rotary Club of Erie (1986–87). He served as a convenor for the Texas Baptist University presidents. He is a member of Omicron Delta Kappa and Phi Mu Alpha Sinfonia.

A library at Penn State Erie has been named after him.

Academic offices
Preceded by Stephen C. McFarlane (interim)	President of the University of Nevada, Reno; 2001–2005	Succeeded by Joseph N. Crowley (interim)
