= Brian Sandoval =

Governor of Nevada from 2011 to 2019

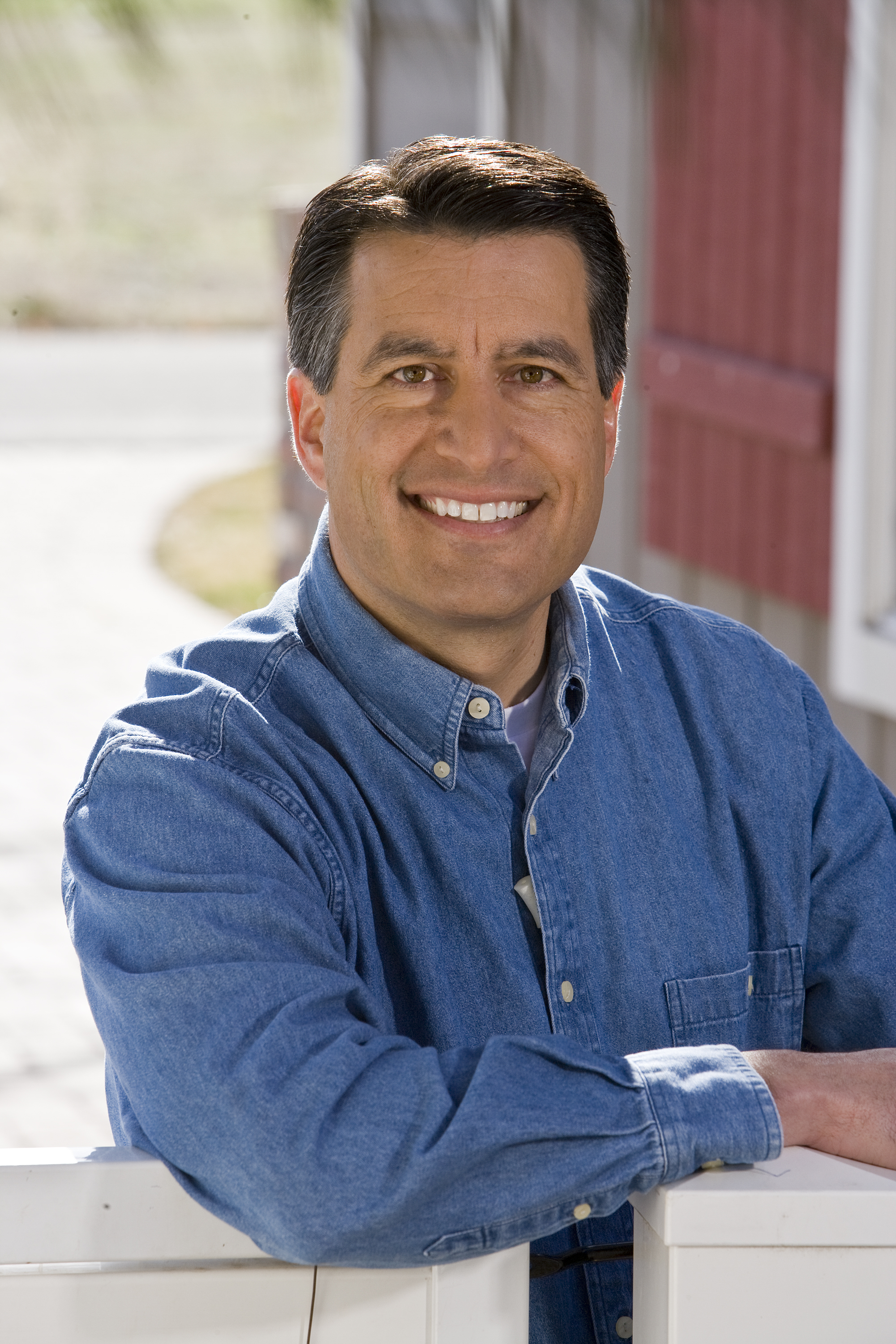

17th President of the University of Nevada, Reno
- Incumbent
- Assumed office October 5, 2020
- Preceded by: Marc Johnson

29th Governor of Nevada
- In office January 3, 2011 – January 7, 2019
- Lieutenant: Brian Krolicki; Mark Hutchison
- Preceded by: Jim Gibbons
- Succeeded by: Steve Sisolak

Chair of the National Governors Association
- In office July 16, 2017 – July 21, 2018
- Preceded by: Terry McAuliffe
- Succeeded by: Steve Bullock

Judge of the United States District Court for the District of Nevada
- In office October 26, 2005 – September 15, 2009
- Appointed by: George W. Bush
- Preceded by: Howard D. McKibben
- Succeeded by: Gloria Navarro

30th Attorney General of Nevada
- In office January 6, 2003 – October 26, 2005
- Governor: Kenny Guinn
- Preceded by: Frankie Sue Del Papa
- Succeeded by: George Chanos

Chair of the Nevada Gaming Commission
- In office April 28, 1999 – August 1, 2001
- Appointed by: Kenny Guinn
- Preceded by: Bill Curran
- Succeeded by: Peter Bernhard

Member of the Nevada Gaming Commission
- In office April 18, 1998 – August 1, 2001
- Appointed by: Bob Miller
- Preceded by: Deborah Griffin
- Succeeded by: Peter Bernhard

Member of the Nevada Assembly from the 25th district
- In office November 9, 1994 – April 18, 1998
- Preceded by: Jim Gibbons
- Succeeded by: Dawn Gibbons

Personal details
- Born: Brian Edward Sandoval; August 5, 1963 (age 63) Redding, California, U.S.
- Party: Republican
- Spouses: Kathleen Teipner (m. 1990; div. 2018); Lauralyn McCarthy (m. 2018)
- Children: 3 (with Teipner)
- Education: University of Nevada, Reno (BA); Ohio State University (JD)

Brian Edward Sandoval (Note: Pronounced /ˈsændəˌvɔːl/ SAN-də-vawl.) (born August 5, 1963) is an American politician, academic administrator, and former federal judge, of Mexican descent, who served as the 29th governor of Nevada from 2011 to 2019.

A graduate of the University of Nevada, Reno, Sandoval began his political career in the early 1990s. In 1998 he was appointed to be a member of the Nevada Gaming Commission and later served as the commission's chairman from 1999 to 2001. A Republican, Sandoval ran and won the position of Nevada Attorney General and served from 2003 until 2005, when President George W. Bush nominated Sandoval to serve as judge of the United States District Court for the District of Nevada.

Sandoval ran for governor in 2010. He defeated incumbent governor Jim Gibbons for the Republican nomination and later defeated Democratic nominee Rory Reid in the general election. He was re-elected in the 2014 Nevada gubernatorial election, defeating Democrat Bob Goodman with 70.6% of the vote to Goodman's 23.9%. Sandoval was barred by term limits from running for a third term in 2018. He was succeeded by Democrat Steve Sisolak.

Since October 2020, Sandoval has served as the 17th president of the University of Nevada, Reno.

== Early life and education ==
Sandoval was born in Redding, California, to Ron Sandoval (an FAA maintenance supervisor) and his wife Gloria (Gallegos) Sandoval (a legal secretary). A long-time resident of Reno, Sandoval is of Hispanic ancestry. Sandoval attended Reno's Little Flower School and graduated from Bishop Manogue High School in Reno in 1981; he attended the University of Nevada, Reno, where he was a member of Sigma Alpha Epsilon fraternity. He earned a Bachelor of Arts degree in English and economics in 1986. He then went on to earn a Juris Doctor from the Ohio State University Moritz College of Law in 1989.

== Early career ==
Sandoval passed the Nevada and California bar exams and entered private practice with several Reno law firms. In 1999, he opened his own law firm in Reno.

=== Nevada Assembly ===
==== Elections ====
When incumbent Republican Jim Gibbons decided to retire to run for Governor of Nevada in 1994, Sandoval ran for the Reno-based 25th District of the Nevada Assembly. He won the open seat and won re-election in 1996. After he resigned from his seat in 1998, Gibbons's wife, Dawn, won the open seat.

==== Tenure ====
Sandoval sponsored 14 bills that became law—including some that prevented felons from suing victims if they are injured committing a crime, increased the penalties for operating a boat under the influence, and allowed indigent defendants to perform community service to defray their legal costs.

==== Committee assignments ====
Sandoval served on the Judiciary, Taxation and Natural Resources Committees. He also served on the Wisconsin Legislative Commission, the Advisory Commission on Sentencing, the Juvenile Justice Commission, the Advisory Council on Community Notification of Sex Offenders, and the Tahoe Regional Planning Agency Oversight Committee.

=== Gaming Commission of Nevada ===
In 1998, Sandoval was appointed to serve as a member of the Gaming Commission of Nevada, which oversees the state's gaming industry. The following year, at the age of 35, Sandoval became the youngest person ever to serve as chairman of the gaming commission. During his time on the commission, Sandoval fought national efforts to block gambling on college sports events, worked on regulations limiting neighborhood gaming and worked for regulations prohibiting slot machines with themes attractive to children.

== Attorney General of Nevada ==
=== 2002 election ===
Sandoval announced his bid on October 11, 2001, to succeed three-term Democrat Frankie Sue Del Papa who was not eligible to run for re–election as Attorney General of Nevada due to lifetime term limits established by the Nevada Constitution in 1996. His primary major party opposition was Democratic attorney John Hunt from Las Vegas, whom Sandoval defeated by a margin of 58.32% to 33.63% on November 5, 2002. Sandoval took office on January 6, 2003.

=== Tenure ===
While Attorney General, Sandoval led the state's legal fight against the storage of nuclear waste at Yucca Mountain, developed Nevada's first Public Integrity Unit and sponsored legislation strengthening Nevada's laws against domestic violence, drug abuse and human trafficking.

As attorney general, Sandoval was also the chairman and a member of several state boards and commissions, including the Nevada Boards of Pardons, Prisons, Transportation, and Examiners; the Cyber-Crime Task Force; the Committee on Domestic Violence, and the Prosecutorial Advisory Council.

== Federal district judge ==
=== Nomination ===
In the fall of 2004, Democratic Senator Harry Reid spoke with Sandoval about whether he was interested in serving as a judge for the United States District Court for the District of Nevada, and that December, Reid recommended to President George W. Bush that he nominate Sandoval to a future opening on that court. Sandoval was formally nominated by Bush on March 1, 2005, to the seat being vacated by Judge Howard D. McKibben.

On September 29, 2005, the Senate Judiciary Committee held a confirmation hearing on Sandoval's nomination. On October 20, 2005, the Judiciary committee reported Sandoval's nomination out of committee on a voice vote. Sandoval was unanimously confirmed by the United States Senate on October 24, 2005 by an 89–0 vote (with 11 Senators not voting). Sandoval received his judicial commission on October 26, 2005.

=== Tenure ===
Sandoval announced his resignation as Judge of the United States District Court for the District of Nevada on August 15, 2009, to become effective beginning September 15, 2009. On the same day as his resignation became official, Sandoval announced he was running for the Governorship. Sandoval's chambers were in the Bruce R. Thompson Courthouse and Federal Building in Reno.

== Governor of Nevada ==
=== 2010 election ===
On June 9, 2010, in the Republican primary, Sandoval defeated incumbent Governor Jim Gibbons. In the general election, Sandoval won 53%–41%, against Democrat Rory Reid, the Clark County Commissioner and son of U.S. Senate Majority Leader Harry Reid. He won every county in the state, and all with a majority except Clark County, where Las Vegas is the county seat, which Sandoval won with a plurality (49%–47%).

=== 2014 election ===
Sandoval ran for re-election in 2014. He won the Republican primary with 90% of the vote. In the general election, Sandoval defeated Democrat Bob Goodman with over 70% of the vote.

=== Tenure ===
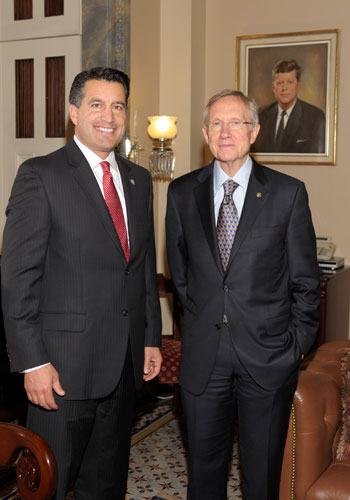
Sandoval and Nevada U.S. Senator Harry Reid in 2010

Sandoval, as the state's 29th Governor, proposed a $5.8 billion 2011 budget without any new taxes. It could cause as many as 361 layoffs and 5% pay reductions for state workers. It also included a 5% cut in primary education and 7% cut in higher education. Sandoval turned down a pay raise that would have increased his salary from $141,000 to $149,573 per year. He also has said he will take a 5% pay cut to coincide with every other state worker's.

The final budget for 2011 avoided deep cuts to education and human services programs. It contained a number of reforms that include ending teacher tenure as well as the practice of deciding layoffs based solely on teacher seniority, allowing local governments to re-open employee contracts during financial emergencies as well as barring collective bargaining by supervisors, and eliminating retirement health insurance for new state employees hired after January 1, 2012.

He appointed U.S. Congressman Dean Heller (R–Carson City) to become U.S. Senator, after the seat became vacant from the resignation of John Ensign.

On September 11, 2014, Sandoval signed a package bill to provide $1.3 billion in tax breaks and subsidies over 20 years for Tesla Motors in exchange for building the massive Gigafactory 1 battery factory in the state, near Reno. The factory was seen as key to Nevada's efforts to revitalize its economy, which was hard-hit by the mortgage meltdown and the Great Recession and, at the time, had yet to fully recover. In June 2015, Sandoval signed several bills designed to overhaul Nevada's education system. The reforms substantially increased funding for public schools and grants and created incentives to recruit more teachers and promote professional training. $10 million were appropriated for preschool programs and an expansion of full-day kindergarten across Nevada.

Sandoval came into conflict with the rooftop solar industry in Nevada in 2015, which accused him of failing to act on a statewide net energy metering cap of 235MW and reducing in-state jobs in the industry. The cap was hit on August 20, 2015. A Nevadan solar company filed a lawsuit against Sandoval the following December to compel the release of withheld records, which included text messages between the Governor and his staff with NV Energy's lobbyists. Sandoval's Public Utilities Commission of Nevada voted to eliminate the state's net metering policy for rooftop solar on December 22.

Sandoval is widely regarded as a moderate Republican, supporting abortion, Obamacare, immigration reform, and renewable energy. Sandoval was suggested by Senator Harry Reid as a potential nominee to fill the seat of deceased Supreme Court Justice Antonin Scalia, given his judicial experience as well as his moderate reputation; however, Sandoval quickly withdrew himself from consideration.

On March 21, 2016, Sandoval met with Mark Davis, owner of the NFL's Oakland Raiders, about moving the Raiders to Las Vegas, Nevada. On October 14, 2016, Sandoval signed a bill that would provide $750 million in public funding for Allegiant Stadium which would open four years later for the Raiders and the UNLV Rebels football program in July 2020.

On July 12, 2016, Sandoval launched a comprehensive review of Nevada's juvenile justice system and established the Statewide Juvenile Justice Improvement Task Force. Nevada was selected to receive technical assistance from The Council of State Governments (CSG) Justice Center through a grant from the U.S. Department of Justice's Office of Juvenile Justice and Delinquency Prevention. Following the launch, the CSG Justice Center conducted an analysis of the state's juvenile justice system and made recommendations to the task force based on its assessment.

On May 17, 2017, Sandoval signed Senate Bill 201, which would ban psychotherapists from performing conversion therapy on minors.

== Gaming executive ==
After leaving office, Sandoval joined MGM Resorts International as the president of global gaming development. In that role, he was responsible for leading MGM's efforts in legalizing casino gambling in Japan and public policy around sports betting in the United States. He left the position in April 2020 to apply for the position of president of the University of Nevada, Reno. In February 2025, concurrently with serving as president of UNR, Sandoval was named to the board of directors of Resorts World Las Vegas, an effort to provide local oversight over a casino which had been mired with issues.

== President of University of Nevada, Reno ==
On September 17, 2020, Sandoval was named as UNR's 17th president (following Marc Johnson). He is considered an unusual choice because his background does not include any experience in higher education administration. He is the first Hispanic president of the university, as well as the first alumnus of the university to serve as its president. As UNR president, Sandoval has pushed to expand enrollment to 25,000 students by 2030 in what he calls the "Wolf Pack Way".

== Honors and awards ==
Sandoval has received the following awards and certificates: the Hispanics in Politics' 1996 "Broche de Oro Award"; the Anti-Defamation League's 2003 "Torch of Liberty Award;" the Nevada State Bar's 2004 "Access to Justice Public Lawyer Award;" The Latino Coalition's 2004 "Most Influential Hispanic in the U.S. Award"; and the 2004 University of Nevada "Alumnus of the Year Award."

== Personal life ==
Sandoval married Kathleen Teipner in 1990. With Kathleen, the program director for the Children's Cabinet in Reno, Sandoval has three children. He and his wife announced their separation in 2017 and finalized their divorce in 2018, stating the demands of public life as the main reason. Sandoval remarried Lauralyn McCarthy, a Las Vegas gaming executive on August 11, 2018.

== Electoral history ==
Nevada's 25th Assembly District Republican Primary Election, 1994
Party	Candidate	Votes	%	±
Republican	Brian Sandoval	4,237	74.75%	
Republican	Heidi Smith	1,431	25.25	

Nevada's 25th Assembly District Election, 1994
Party	Candidate	Votes	%	±
Republican	Brian Sandoval	10,497	79.78%	
Democratic	Karol Kellison	2,661	20.22%	

Nevada's 25th Assembly District Election, 1996
Party	Candidate	Votes	%	±
Republican	Brian Sandoval (inc.)	12,513	100.00	

Nevada Attorney General election, 2002
Party	Candidate	Votes	%	±%
Republican	Brian Sandoval	290,471	58.32%	
Democratic	John Hunt	167,513	33.63%	

2010 Republican gubernatorial primary results
Party	Candidate	Votes	%
Republican	Brian Sandoval	97,201	55.5
Republican	Jim Gibbons (inc.)	47,616	27.2
Republican	Mike Montandon	22,002	12.6
Republican	None of These Candidates	4,400	2.5
Republican	Tony Atwood	2,440	1.4
Republican	Stan Lusak	1,380	0.8
Total votes		175,039	100

Nevada gubernatorial election, 2010
Party	Candidate	Votes	%	±%
Republican	Brian Sandoval	382,350	53.36%	+5.44%
Democratic	Rory Reid	298,171	41.61%	−2.31%
None of These Candidates	None of These Candidates	12,231	1.71%	−1.85%
Independent	Eugene DiSimone	6,403	0.89%	
Independent American	Floyd Fitzgibbons	5,049	0.70%	−2.73%
Libertarian	Arthur Forest Lampitt Jr.	4,672	0.65%	
Green	David Scott Curtis	4,437	0.62%	−0.54%
Independent	Aaron Y. Honig	3,216	0.45%	
Majority		84,179	11.75%	+7.74%
Turnout		716,529		
Republican hold		Swing		

2014 Republican gubernatorial primary results
Party	Candidate	Votes	%
Republican	Brian Sandoval	105,857	89.88
Republican	Edward Hamilton	3,758	3.19
Republican	None of These Candidates	3,509	2.98
Republican	William Tarbell	1,966	1.67
Republican	Thomas Tighe	1,495	1.27
Republican	Gary Marinch	1,195	1.01
Total votes		117,780	100

Nevada gubernatorial election, 2014
Party	Candidate	Votes	%	±%
Republican	Brian Sandoval (inc.)	386,340	70.58%	
Democratic	Bob Goodman	130,722	23.88%	
None of These Candidates	None of These Candidates	15,751	2.88%	
Independent American	David Lory VanDerBeek	14,536	2.66%	
Majority		547,349	100%	
Republican hold		Swing		

== See also ==
- Barack Obama Supreme Court candidates
- List of first minority male lawyers and judges in Nevada
- List of Hispanic and Latino American jurists
- List of minority governors and lieutenant governors in the United States

== Notes ==
Legal offices
Preceded by Frankie Sue Del Papa	Attorney General of Nevada; 2003–2005	Succeeded by George Chanos
Preceded by Howard D. McKibben	Judge of the United States District Court for the District of Nevada; 2005–2009	Succeeded by Gloria Navarro
Party political offices
Preceded by Jim Gibbons	Republican nominee for Governor of Nevada; 2010, 2014	Succeeded by Adam Laxalt
Political offices
Preceded by Jim Gibbons	Governor of Nevada; 2011–2019	Succeeded by Steve Sisolak
Preceded by Terry McAuliffe	Chair of the National Governors Association; 2017–2018	Succeeded by Steve Bullock
Academic offices
Preceded by Marc Johnson	President of the University of Nevada, Reno; 2020–present	Incumbent
U.S. order of precedence (ceremonial)
Preceded by Jim Gibbons as Former Governor	Order of precedence of the United States	Succeeded by Steve Sisolak as Former Governor
