= List of United States federal courthouses in Nevada =

Following is a list of current and former courthouses of the United States federal court system located in Nevada. Each entry indicates the name of the building along with an image, if available, its location and the jurisdiction it covers, the dates during which it was used for each such jurisdiction, and, if applicable the person for whom it was named, and the date of renaming. Dates of use will not necessarily correspond with the dates of construction or demolition of a building, as pre-existing structures may be adapted or court use, and former court buildings may later be put to other uses. Also, the official name of the building may be changed at some point after its use as a federal court building has been initiated.

== Courthouses ==
Courthouse	City	Image	Street address	Jurisdiction	Dates of use	Named for
Paul Laxalt State Building† (formerly the U.S. Court House & Post Office)	Carson City		401 North Carson Street	D. Nev.	1891–1965; Now in use by the Nevada Commission on Tourism	Governor Paul Laxalt (1999)
Las Vegas Post Office and Courthouse†	Las Vegas		300 East Stewart Avenue	D. Nev.	1933–1983	n/a
Foley Federal Building and United States Courthouse	Las Vegas		300 Las Vegas Boulevard South	D. Nev.	?–present	The Foley family of Nevada. (1984)
Lloyd D. George Federal Courthouse	Las Vegas		333 Las Vegas Boulevard	D. Nev.	2002–present	District Court judge Lloyd D. George
C. Clifton Young Federal Building and United States Courthouse†	Reno		300 Booth Street	D. Nev.	1965–present Used by the U.S. Bankruptcy Court	U.S. Rep. Clarence Clifton Young (1988)
Bruce R. Thompson U.S. Courthouse and Federal Building	Reno		400 South Virginia Street	D. Nev.	1995–present	District Court judge Bruce Rutherford Thompson

== Key ==
^{†}	Listed on the National Register of Historic Places (NRHP)
^{††}	NRHP-listed and also designated as a National Historic Landmark
