= Jennifer P. Togliatti =

American judge

Judge of the Eighth Judicial District Court of Nevada
- In office 2002–2018
- Succeeded by: Cristina D. Silva

Personal details
- Born: Jennifer Paige Togliatti; 1967 (age 58–59) Waterbury, Connecticut, U.S.
- Education: University of Nevada, Las Vegas (BS); California Western School of Law (JD)

Jennifer Paige Togliatti (born 1967) is the chairwoman of the Nevada Gaming Commission since 2021 and a former Senior Nevada state court judge who is a former nominee to be a United States district judge of the United States District Court for the District of Nevada.

== Education ==
Togliatti earned her Bachelor of Science from the University of Nevada, Las Vegas, and her Juris Doctor from the California Western School of Law.

== Legal career ==
Togliatti previously served as a Deputy District Attorney for Clark County, Nevada.

== Judicial service ==
=== State court service ===
Togliatti spent nearly two decades as a judge on Nevada's Clark County District Court, serving as Chief Judge from 2011 to 2014. She was previously a Las Vegas Justice of the Peace. She served as a Senior Judge on the Nevada District Court and a private mediator and arbitrator for complex civil litigation cases and mass torts. She retired on January 2, 2019.

=== Expired nomination to federal district court ===
On October 16, 2019, President Donald Trump announced his intent to nominate Togliatti to serve as a United States district judge for the United States District Court for the District of Nevada. On November 21, 2019, her nomination was sent to the Senate. President Trump nominated Togliatti to the seat on the United States District Court for the District of Nevada vacated by Judge James C. Mahan, who assumed senior status on June 29, 2018. Her nomination was welcomed by Nevada's two senators, Catherine Cortez Masto and Jacky Rosen. On January 3, 2020, her nomination was returned to the President under Rule XXXI, Paragraph 6 of the United States Senate. On February 13, 2020, her renomination was sent to the Senate again. On March 4, 2020, a hearing on her nomination was held before the Senate Judiciary Committee. On May 14, 2020, her nomination was reported out of committee by a 15–7 vote. On January 3, 2021, her nomination was returned to the President under Rule XXXI, Paragraph 6 of the United States Senate.

=== Potential renomination under Biden ===
She has been mentioned as possibly being renominated to the district court under President Joe Biden.

== Nevada Gaming Commission ==
In October 2021, Togliatti was appointed by Nevada Governor Steve Sisolak as chairwoman of the Nevada Gaming Commission. She is the first woman to chair the commission.
