= Roger Foley =

Roger Foley may refer to:

- Ellis D Fogg, sculptor whose real name was Roger Foley
- Roger Thomas Foley (1886–1974), U.S. federal judge
- Roger D. Foley (1917–1996), U.S. federal judge, and son of Roger Thomas Foley
