= Judge Foley =

Judge Foley may refer to:

- James Thomas Foley (1910–1990), judge of the United States District Court for the Northern District of New York
- Maurice B. Foley (born 1960), judge of the United States Tax Court
- Roger D. Foley (1917–1996), judge of the United States District Court for the District of Nevada
- Roger Thomas Foley (1886–1974), judge of the United States District Court for the District of Nevada
