= Alexander Baldwin (disambiguation) =

Alexander W. Baldwin (1835–1869) was an American judge.

Alexander Baldwin may also refer to:

- Alec Baldwin (Alexander Rae Baldwin III; born 1958), American actor
- Alexander & Baldwin, American company
- Alex Poletov Baldwin, a character from the American science fiction web television series For All Mankind

== See also ==
- Alex Baldwin (born 1969), also known as Talon, American pornographic actor, member of the AVN Hall of Fame
- W. E. B. Griffin (1929–2019), American writer who used the pseudonym Alex Baldwin
- Baldwin (name), including a list of people and fictional characters with the surname
