= Larry Hicks =

Larry Hicks may refer to:

- Larry R. Hicks (1943–2024), United States District Judge
- Larry S. Hicks (born 1958), American politician in Wyoming
