= George Myron Sabin =

American lawyer and judge (1834–1890)

United States District Judge for the District of Nevada
- In office July 26, 1882 – May 12, 1890
- Appointed by: Chester A. Arthur
- Preceded by: Edgar Winters Hillyer
- Succeeded by: Thomas Porter Hawley

Personal details
- Born: September 18, 1834 Strongsville, Ohio, U.S.
- Died: May 12, 1890 (aged 54) San Francisco, California, U.S.
- Cause of death: Gout
- Resting place: Lone Mountain Cemetery, Carson City, Nevada
- Party: Republican
- Spouse: None
- Children: None
- Education: Case Western Reserve University read law
- Profession: Lawyer

Military service
- Allegiance: United States
- Branch/service: United States Volunteers; Union Army
- Years of service: 1861–1866
- Rank: Lt. Colonel, USV
- Unit: 1st Reg. Wis. Vol. Infantry; 11th Reg. Wis. Vol. Infantry; 16th Reg. Wis. Vol. Infantry
- Battles/wars: American Civil War

George Myron Sabin (September 18, 1834 – May 12, 1890) was an American lawyer and judge. He served the last 8 years of his life as United States district judge for the District of Nevada.

== Education and career ==
Born in Strongsville, Ohio, Sabin attended Western Reserve College (now Case Western Reserve University) and read law to enter the bar, beginning a private practice in Madison, Wisconsin in 1858. He was an officer in the Union Army during the American Civil War, from 1861 to 1864. He was initially enlisted as a private in the 1st Wisconsin Infantry Regiment. He re-enlisted with the 11th Wisconsin Infantry Regiment after the expiration of his first three-month term and was commissioned quartermaster of the regiment. He then transferred to the 16th Wisconsin Infantry Regiment and served as adjutant. In 1863, he was commissioned as a judge advocate for the military district of Vicksburg, serving there until the resumption of civilian courts in 1866. Sabin was in private practice in Madison from 1866 to 1867, and then in Treasure Hill, Nevada, from 1868 to 1872, in Pioche, Nevada until 1877, and in Eureka, Nevada until 1881.

== Federal judicial service ==
On July 20, 1882, Sabin was nominated by President Chester A. Arthur to a seat on the United States District Court for the District of Nevada vacated by Judge Edgar Winters Hillyer. Sabin was confirmed by the United States Senate on July 26, 1882, and received his commission the same day. He served in that capacity until his death of inflammatory rheumatism on May 12, 1890, in San Francisco, California. He left an estate worth $1,500.

== Sources ==
Legal offices
Preceded by Edgar Winters Hillyer	United States District Judge for the District of Nevada; 1882–1890	Succeeded by Thomas Porter Hawley
