= Harry E. Claiborne =

American judge (1917–2004)

Harry Claiborne
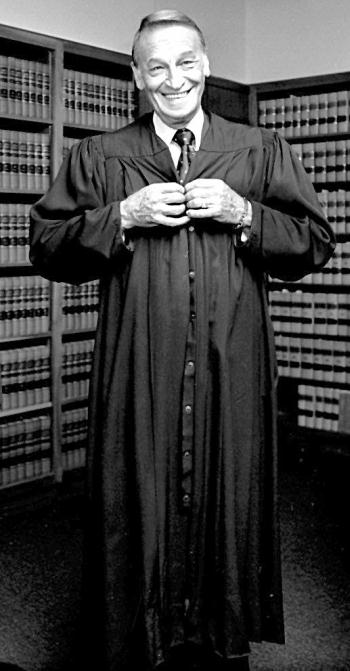

Chief Judge of the United States District Court for the District of Nevada
- In office 1980 – October 9, 1986
- Preceded by: Roger D. Foley
- Succeeded by: Edward Cornelius Reed Jr.

Judge of the United States District Court for the District of Nevada
- In office August 11, 1978 – October 9, 1986
- Appointed by: Jimmy Carter
- Preceded by: Bruce Rutherford Thompson
- Succeeded by: Philip Martin Pro

Personal details
- Born: Harry Eugene Claiborne; July 2, 1917 McRae, Arkansas, U.S.
- Died: January 19, 2004 (aged 86) Las Vegas, Nevada, U.S.
- Education: Ouachita Baptist University; Cumberland University (LLB)

Harry Eugene Claiborne (July 2, 1917 – January 19, 2004) was a United States district judge of the United States District Court for the District of Nevada from 1978 until his impeachment and removal in 1986. Appointed by President Jimmy Carter in 1978, Claiborne was only the fifth person in United States history to be removed from office through impeachment by the United States Congress and the first since Halsted Ritter in 1936.

Claiborne was born in 1917 in McRae, Arkansas. He attended Ouachita Baptist University and Cumberland School of Law where he received a Bachelor of Laws before serving in the United States Army during World War II. After the war he settled in Las Vegas, Nevada, where he established himself as a flamboyant and well-known defense attorney representing many prominent people with ties to Las Vegas, including entertainers like Frank Sinatra, Dean Martin, Judy Garland, and Carol Burnett, and mobsters like Bugsy Siegel, Frank "Lefty" Rosenthal, Joe Conforte, and Benny Binion.

Claiborne served one term as a Democratic state assemblyman and ran unsuccessfully against Howard Cannon in the 1964 Democratic primary for the United States Senate in Nevada. The two remained friends, however, and Cannon later recommended Claiborne to President Carter for an open federal district court judicial seat in 1978. He rose to Chief Judge of the United States district court in Nevada and held that position from 1980 to 1986.

Claiborne was convicted in 1984 of tax evasion and served 17 months of a two-year prison sentence before his release in 1987. In 1986 the United States House of Representatives impeached him and the United States Senate convicted him and removed him from office. His impeachment proceedings set a controversial new precedent of using a special twelve-member committee to collect and hear evidence, rather than the full Senate. He maintained that the Justice Department had a vendetta against him and improperly obtained the false testimony of brothel owner Joe Conforte, one of Claiborne's former clients.

Claiborne was allowed to begin practicing law again in Nevada in 1987 in a decision by the Nevada Supreme Court that implicitly questioned the federal prosecution. In 2004, he killed himself with a self-inflicted gunshot wound following health battles with cancer, heart disease, and Alzheimer's disease.

== Early life and education ==
Claiborne was born on July 2, 1917, in McRae, Arkansas. His father was Arthur Smith Claiborne Jr., a cotton farmer, and his mother was Minnie King Claiborne, a schoolteacher in Little Rock, Arkansas. According to Harry, the Ku Klux Klan's grand wizard once criticized Harry's father, Arthur, for being the only white farmer in the region who was not a member of the organization. Arthur responded, "I won't join any organization whose members need to wear hoods over their faces." After later saving an immigrant farmer from a lynching, Arthur knew the KKK would return for retribution and waited at the immigrant's farm with a shotgun. When the KKK arrived, one of their members approached a barn with a lit torch, but Arthur fired a round of buckshot into him and knocked him from his horse. According to Harry, "Never again was a man lynched by the KKK in his community because they knew they would have to answer to [Arthur] Claiborne." The event had a profound impact on Harry's worldview.

Growing up in McRae, Claiborne gained a reputation for his speaking ability. He would often accompany his grandfather to view court proceedings at the White County Courthouse in nearby Searcy, Arkansas.

Claiborne attended Ouachita Baptist University. He was determined to attend law school at Louisiana State University so he hitchhiked to Baton Rouge, Louisiana, seeking admission. At the time one only needed two years of college for admittance to law school. After he was refused admission, Claiborne hitchhiked back home to Arkansas and caught a ride with a salesman named Schneider, who told Claiborne that he was childhood friends with Judge Albert B. Neil, the chief justice of the Tennessee Supreme Court. Mr. Schneider gave Claiborne a letter of introduction, and after visiting Neil in person, Claiborne was granted admission to Cumberland School of Law, then part of Cumberland University in Tennessee. He graduated from Cumberland with a Bachelor of Laws in June 1941 and returned to Arkansas, where he was a clerk in the Coulter Law Firm of Little Rock (Pulaski County).

== Pre-judicial career ==
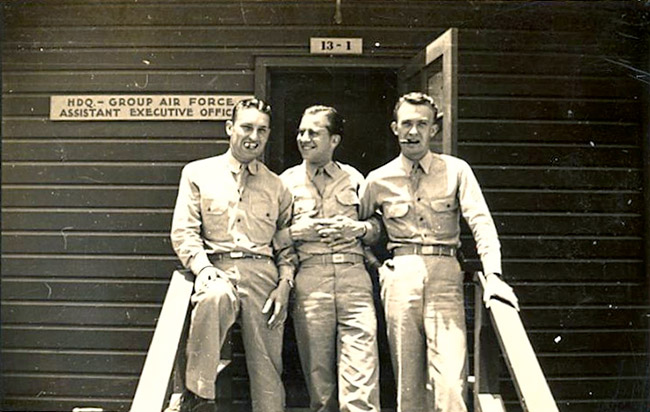
Harry Claiborne (left) during World War II

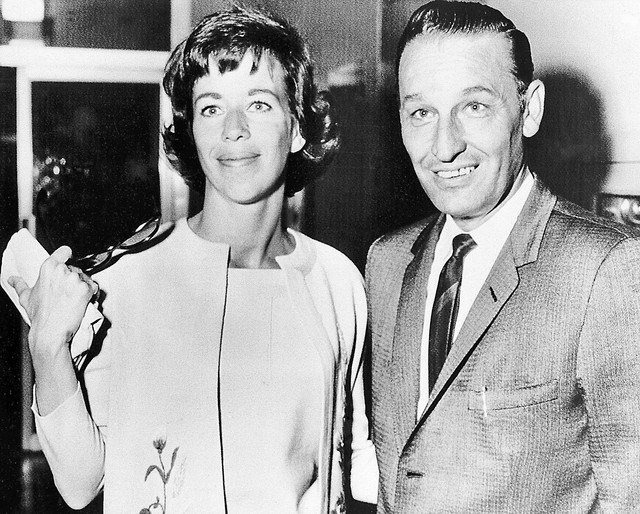
Claiborne with Carol Burnett after her divorce proceedings with actor Don Saroyan

In 1942 during World War II, Claiborne was admitted to practice in his home state of Arkansas, but since the war had just begun, he enlisted in the United States Army and was sent to the Santa Ana Army Air Base. He served in the military police force. He would later say that he was inspired by his father's stand against the Ku Klux Klan and so refused to go along with the internment of Japanese Americans in camps, and was punished for doing so. Whatever happened, by 1943, Claiborne was promoted to warrant officer and transferred to what is now Nellis Air Force Base near Las Vegas, Nevada. His job was to investigate AWOL (absent without leave) incidents. Later, he guarded prisoners and supervised the military police who patrolled downtown Las Vegas. He was briefly stationed in New Mexico and then Massachusetts.

Claiborne was issued a train ticket home to Arkansas in 1945, but he instead opted to go to Las Vegas. Within a day of arriving, he secured a job as a patrolman for the Las Vegas Police Department. By 1947, he was admitted to the Nevada state bar and was working in the Clark County District Attorney's office. He was later the chief deputy district attorney for Clark County (1946–1948) and served as a state assemblyman in 1948. That same year he also served as city attorney for North Las Vegas.

After entering private practice Claiborne quickly became a well-known defense attorney in Las Vegas. Claiborne not only represented many police officers in legal matters without charge, but helped establish the police protective association in Las Vegas and was instrumental in securing the passage of legislation providing for civil service status for policemen and firemen by the Nevada legislature. He was considered one of Nevada's top defense lawyers, representing many prominent people with ties to Las Vegas. Frank Sinatra and Dean Martin hired him for casino licensing matters. Judy Garland, Carol Burnett, and one of Errol Flynn's wives came to him for divorces. He represented several mobsters like Bugsy Siegel and Frank "Lefty" Rosenthal. He also represented Giuseppe "Joe" Conforte, the owner of the Mustang Ranch brothel, and Benny Binion, owner of the Horseshoe Casino. All his clients, whoever they were, were advised not to fill out financial net worth statements when applying for gaming licenses; Claiborne said these could be used as evidence in possible income tax evasion prosecutions by the IRS. He said he personally would never fill one out. Claiborne was a flamboyant attorney who would frighten other lawyers by carrying in large stacks of papers that he passed off as his evidence in the case, but in reality the papers in the folders often were blank. In 1974 and 1975 Claiborne served as a special assistant to the United States Senate Committee on Rules and Administration during the historic hearings on Nelson Rockefeller's nomination to the vice-presidency.

In April 1978 he represented R. D. Matthews during his appearance before the House Select Committee on Assassinations.

== 1964 United States Senate campaign ==
In 1964, Claiborne launched a "quixotic, albeit short-lived, campaign for Senate at the last minute on July 15." His campaign in the Democratic primary for the United States Senate was against his friend, incumbent Senator Howard Cannon. Years later Claiborne indicated he was recruited to run by party activists concerned that Cannon's ties to Bobby Baker, the Senate secretary who was then at the center of a financial scandal, would cause the party to lose the seat. Two others entered the primary as well – Las Vegas civil rights activist James McMillan and Sparks City Councilman Bill Galt. However, Claiborne was seen as a bigger threat to Cannon due to Claiborne's high-profile in Las Vegas and his "man-on-the-street appeal" that the other contenders could not match. Las Vegas Review-Journal reporter Jude Wanniski wrote that Claiborne "seems forceful, animated and determined – even if less organized. He bills himself as a fighter and he sounds that way. He mispronounces words here and there, and, for a lawyer, mangles the English language to an unbelievable extent. But it's all masculine and vigorous."

Nevertheless, Claiborne's primary campaign "soon deteriorated into a piecemeal, uncoordinated exercise that almost all political analysts and journalists described as hopeless." Cannon ultimately won the nomination and received 59% of the vote. Claiborne placed third, receiving 10,807 votes compared to Galt's 12,054 votes. On primary election night, Claiborne rushed to Cannon's campaign headquarters to congratulate him and pledge support in the general election, proclaiming, "Howard Cannon is a fine man. I know he can serve us better than his opponent." Nearly forty years later, Claiborne noted, "I misjudged the Baker factor. I thought it would defeat Howard."

== Federal judicial service ==
On July 25, 1978, Claiborne was nominated by President Jimmy Carter to a seat on the United States District Court for the District of Nevada vacated by Judge Bruce R. Thompson, on the recommendation of Claiborne's former opponent, Senator Howard Cannon. During the appointment process, on August 8, 1978, a hearing was held before the United States Senate Committee on the Judiciary concerning his qualifications and background. At the start of that hearing, the acting chairman, Senator Dennis DeConcini, stated for the record that he had been advised that a "substantial majority" of the Standing Committee on the Federal Judiciary of the American Bar Association was of the opinion that Claiborne was "well qualified" for appointment to the federal bench; a minority of the Bar Association's committee found him not qualified on the sole ground that Claiborne was, at that time, sixty-one years of age. Although not part of any official Senate proceedings, other sources note that Claiborne was unique as a federal judge, given that most federal judges had experience as Assistant United States Attorneys. He also maintained a close friendship with former client Benny Binion, a casino owner and convicted murderer; the two men frequently ate lunch together. Moreover, Claiborne was known for cashing large checks at Las Vegas casinos and had a "reputation for liking whiskey and flashy women." Claiborne was confirmed by the United States Senate on August 11, 1978, received his commission the same day, and was sworn in on September 1, 1978. He served as Chief Judge from 1980 to 1986.

== Allegations of impropriety ==
In April 1977, Joe Conforte – one of Claiborne's former clients who owned a well-known Storey County, Nevada, brothel called Mustang Ranch – was arrested on 10 counts of income tax evasion and faced a minimum five years in prison and $10,000 fine. He appealed his conviction but fled the country in 1980 when he lost the appeal. Just before fleeing in December 1980, Conforte contacted a prosecutor and offered to become a federal witness against officials he said he had bribed. The most prominent name on Mr. Conforte's list was Harry Claiborne. Conforte claimed he paid Claiborne $85,000 in bribes to give to federal appeals judges to reverse his tax conviction and quash the subpoenas of two prostitutes in a federal investigation into voter fraud.

Joseph Yablonsky, who headed the Las Vegas FBI office from 1980 to 1983, offered Conforte millions of dollars in tax breaks for his testimony against Claiborne. Gerald Swanson, who served alongside Yablonsky as director of the Internal Revenue Service in Nevada, could not verify the allegations and therefore refused to support a grand jury probe based on Conforte's testimony. Since Yablonsky needed Swanson's help with tax breaks for Conforte, he targeted him in a phony sting to see if he would accept bribes to reduce Conforte's tax bill. Swanson did not take the bait and the sting was aborted with no charges, but Swanson was nevertheless placed on administrative leave in 1982 and later transferred to Dallas, where he became an assistant regional commissioner.

With Swanson neutralized, Yablonsky was able in 1983 to get the help of the IRS in returning Conforte to the United States in exchange for testimony against Claiborne. A federal grand jury heard testimony against Claiborne in Portland and Reno, where the Conforte bribes allegedly took place, before indicting Claiborne on bribery, fraud, and tax evasion on December 8, 1983. In April 1984, however, the jury deadlocked and a mistrial was declared, primarily because Conforte's bribery testimony did not hold up in court. Trial evidence showed that Conforte could not have been in Nevada to make one of the bribes because he was in New York renewing a passport while appealing his tax conviction. According to Swanson, "Conforte perjured himself consistently at the trial. His testimony was fabricated. I don't think there were any bribes at all. Conforte constructed the testimony to suit Yablonsky's needs."

At Claiborne's second trial in July 1984, prosecutors dismissed the bribery charges and proceeded only with the tax charges, which did not involve Conforte. Claiborne was ultimately convicted the next month for failing to report more than $107,000 on his 1979 and 1980 federal income tax returns, money he earned as a lawyer before his appointment by President Carter in 1978. Prosecutors alleged that the judge had hidden thousands of dollars in attorneys fees from the IRS after he was appointed to the federal bench in 1978. On August 10, 1984, Claiborne was found guilty in the U.S. District Court of Nevada for tax evasion, fined $10,000, and sentenced to two years in prison. He became the first federal judge ever convicted of crimes while on the bench. On March 16, 1986, Claiborne began serving his prison sentence in FPC Montgomery, a federal prison located on the grounds of Maxwell Air Force Base in Montgomery, Alabama. He was there for 17 months until October 1987.

Many lawyers and judges in the Nevada legal community regarded it as a case of selective prosecution. Swanson said that had Conforte not been brought in to testify against Claiborne and give him a bad name, the IRS would have resolved the judge's tax problems through routine civil proceedings. Claiborne long maintained he was too busy on the bench to pay close attention to his tax return, noting he never even looked at the document until his accountant brought it to him. "I asked how much I owed, and I wrote a check." Supporter Nevada State District Judge Michael Cherry further alleged in 2004, "He was very, very fair to criminal defendants to his detriment. I think that is why the government was so interested in prosecuting him and knocking him off the bench." That the money was owed, but not paid, was generally conceded.

== Impeachment and removal ==
When Claiborne entered prison on March 16, 1986, for tax evasion, he intended to return to the bench two years later and therefore did not resign his judiciary post. As a result, he continued to receive his salary of $78,700 a year. This brought considerable controversy and pressure on some in Congress to remove him. However, the United States Constitution allowed only one method for removing a federal judge – impeachment.

=== U.S. House proceedings ===
==== Impeachment articles ====
On May 22, 1986, Rep. F. James Sensenbrenner, Jr. (R, WI) called for impeachment. On June 3, 1986, Rep. Peter Rodino (D, NJ) introduced H.Res 461 calling for impeachment of high crimes and misdemeanors. The resolution was referred to the House Judiciary Subcommittee on Courts, Civil Liberties and the Administration of Justice. The subcommittee approved the impeachment articles on June 24, 1986.

Article 1 – Claiborne willfully and knowingly filed a United States Individual Income Tax Return in 1979 which failed to report substantial income in addition to that stated on the return, making Claiborne guilty of misbehavior and a high crime and misdemeanor.

Article 2 – Claiborne willfully and knowingly filed a United States Individual Income Tax Return in 1980 which failed to report substantial income in addition to that stated on the return, making Claiborne guilty of misbehavior and a high crime and misdemeanor.

Article 3 – Claiborne was found guilty by a twelve-person jury in the United States District Court for the District of Nevada of filing a false income tax return for the calendar years 1979 and 1980, and a sentence of two years imprisonment for each violation was imposed, to be served concurrently, together with a fine of $5000 for each violation, making Claiborne guilty of misbehavior and high crimes.

Article 4 – Claiborne willfully and knowingly falsified his income on his Federal tax returns for 1979 and 1980, betrayed the trust of the people of the United States, and reduced confidence in the integrity and impartiality of the judiciary, thereby bringing disrepute on the Federal courts and the administration of justice by the courts, making Claiborne guilty of misbehavior and misdemeanors and, by such conduct, warrants impeachment and trial and removal from offices.

The subcommittee version of Article IV also charged that Claiborne had violated his oath of office. But several members, particularly Bruce Morrison, D-Conn., and Michael DeWine, R-Ohio, opposed this language. Morrison argued the entire article was unnecessary and preferred to rely on only the first three articles to make clear that conviction of a felony was enough to warrant removing a judge from office. However, Robert Kastenmeier, D-Wis., chairman of the U.S. House Courts Subcommittee, argued strongly for inclusion of the article, saying it alleged conduct that was an impeachable offense and was premised on the fact that Claiborne had violated the canons of judicial ethics.

Ultimately the subcommittee agreed to a DeWine amendment striking language referring to the oath of office and adding language asserting that Claiborne had "betrayed the trust of the people of the United States." The article was subsequently approved and adopted by the subcommittee on June 24, 1986. In drafting the impeachment articles, the Judiciary Committee tried to stick closely to the jury findings on tax evasion and to the conviction itself. Committee members wanted to avoid general charges that could give Goodman an opening for going beyond the findings of the Nevada jury.

==== Moving for impeachment ====
During a two-hour presentation on June 19, 1986, to Kastenmeier's subcommittee before the panel drew up articles of impeachment, future Las Vegas Mayor Oscar Goodman, Claiborne's principal lawyer, repeated his allegations that Claiborne's trial was tainted by government misconduct. But members indicated these assertions were irrelevant. Kastenmeier noted the allegations did not change the facts — that Claiborne was found by a Nevada jury to have filed false income tax returns in 1979 and 1980.

Having passed the subcommittee, the matter moved on to be considered by the United States House Committee on the Judiciary, which had last considered an impeachment in 1974, when it recommended removing President Richard Nixon from office (Nixon resigned before a House vote). Judiciary Chairman Peter Rodino, Jr., D-N.J., who presided over those Nixon proceedings, told colleagues on June 26, 1986, that judges "simply cannot act in a way that violates the public trust and undermines the integrity of the judicial office. Once public confidence in the courts erodes, our tripartite system of government fails."

Whether or not tax fraud rose to the level of "high crimes and misdemeanors," or whether a convicted felon could be allowed to remain on the federal bench, were not questions discussed at great length. After only a few hours of debate, the House Judiciary Committee reported the articles of impeachment.

==== Impeachment vote ====
On July 22, 1986, the United States House of Representatives adopted H Res 461, voting to impeach Claiborne on a 406-0 roll call. As a unanimous vote. Claiborne's fellow Nevadans, Reps. Harry Reid, a Democrat, and Barbara Vucanovich, a Republican, also voted for impeachment.

Claiborne became the 14th federal official to be impeached by the U.S. House and the first of only three federal officials to be impeached on a unanimous roll-call vote, the others were Thomas Porteous and Walter Nixon. While his impeachment was historic, the debate and final action on July 22 was anticlimactic. No one really doubted that Claiborne would be impeached or that it would be unanimous. On August 6, 1986, the U.S. House presented articles of impeachment to the U.S. Senate.

H. Res. 461 – Impeaching Judge Harry E. Claiborne
July 22, 1986	Yea	Nay	Not voting
July 22, 1986	406	0	24

Hamilton Fish IV, R-N.Y., the ranking Republican on the House Judiciary Committee, expressed his position saying, "Judge Claiborne is more than a mere embarrassment. He is a disgrace — an affront — to the judicial office and the judicial branch he was appointed to serve." Judiciary Chairman Rodino spoke of safeguarding the judicial system, noting, "If we fail to act, the confidence of the people in that system will be gravely jeopardized." Kastenmeier added that the House had "a responsibility to the public. The purpose of impeachment is not to punish the individual but to protect the institution."

Following the impeachment vote, the House selected nine Judiciary Committee members, led by Rodino, to manage, or try, the case against Claiborne in the Senate. The chief House prosecutor was William J. Hughes, D-N.J., chairman of the Crime Subcommittee and a lawyer who served for more than 10 years as a New Jersey prosecutor. The other House managers were Kastenmeier; Romano Mazzoli, D-Ky.; Dan Glickman, D-Kan.; Fish; Henry Hyde, R-Ill.; Thomas Kindness, R-Ohio; and DeWine.

=== Senate proceedings ===
When the U.S. House formally presented the Senate with the four articles of impeachment against Claiborne on August 6, 1986, it set the stage for the first U.S. Senate impeachment trial in fifty years. House Judiciary Chairman, Rep. Rodino, was joined by eight other House managers and read each of the articles "to an unusually somber Senate. About 40 senators were in their seats listening." Vice President George Bush presided over a ceremony where members of the Senate took a special oath for the impeachment trial. The only one absent was Arizona Senator Barry Goldwater, who was ill.

==== Senate procedures ====
On July 25, 1986, the Senate Rules Committee met to draft rules for impeachment trial and on August 12, 1986, the Senate Rules Committee approved revisions of Senate impeachment rules. On August 14, 1986, the Senate established procedures for the impeachment trial, including approving S. Res. 481 providing for the use of trial committee to hear evidence. Rather than convening the entire Senate into a High Court of Impeachment, the Senate agreed that evidence in the Claiborne impeachment trial would be heard, first, by a 12-member panel created for that purpose.

Acting upon a Senate rule adopted in 1935, but never used, the Senate Impeachment Trial Committee examined evidence and heard testimony before reporting its findings to the full Senate. All previous impeachment trials had been conducted before the full Senate. The Senate ultimately decided to use the special committee because Senate leadership did not believe there was enough time for the full Senate to hear all the testimony and wanted to avoid postponing the trial to a lame-duck session or until the next Congress.

Under Senate impeachment rules, the committee could gather evidence, summon witnesses, hear testimony, and present a report to the full Senate. However, the committee could not make a recommendation on whether to convict the impeached official. All senators would then have the opportunity to review the evidence before the chamber voted to convict or acquit. The Senate's use of a committee was controversial and some feared it gave Claiborne a basis on which to criticize the proceedings. Others defended the procedure and argued the Senate was not bound by federal courts traditions and standards.

The committee was made up of six Republicans named by Majority Leader Bob Dole and six Democrats named by Minority Leader Robert Byrd. All were lawyers. The Republicans were Orrin Hatch (Utah), Charles Mathias (Maryland), Mitch McConnell (Kentucky), Larry Pressler (South Dakota), Warren Rudman (New Hampshire), and John Warner (Virginia). Senators Hatch, Mathias, and McConnell were members of the Judiciary Committee. Rudman was a former state attorney general.

The Democrats were Jeff Bingaman (New Mexico), Dennis DeConcini (Arizona), Al Gore (Tennessee), Howell Heflin (Alabama), David Pryor (Arkansas), and Paul Sarbanes (Maryland). Heflin was a former chief justice of the Alabama Supreme Court, Bingaman was a former state attorney general, and Sarbanes had served on the House Judiciary Committee in 1974, during the impeachment process against Nixon (Nixon resigned before the House could vote to either article of impeachment).

==== Special senate committee ====
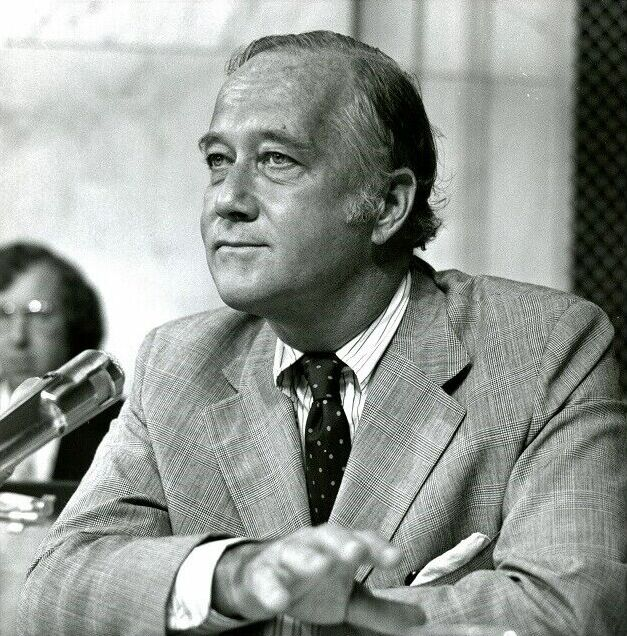
Senate Impeachment Trial Committee chairman Charles Mathias

On September 15, 1986, the Senate Impeachment Trial Committee began seven days of hearings before television cameras in the Senate Caucus Room in the Russell Senate Office Building, the same room used by the special Watergate committee in 1973 for the investigation of President Nixon. Although Nixon's Watergate hearings were in the legislative tradition, the Claiborne hearings resembled more of a judicial proceeding. The House managers, acting as prosecutors, were on one side of the room, and on the other side was Claiborne, escorted by federal marshals and his lawyers. Claiborne's primary lawyer was future Las Vegas Mayor Oscar Goodman.

The special senate committee was chaired by Sen. Charles Mathias, who tried to follow the rules of evidence and procedures used in a courtroom trial. For the first couple of days senators submitted their questions to Sen. Mathias and he put them to the witnesses. But on September 17, 1986, the full Senate quickly adopted a rule permitting each senator to ask their own questions. After seven days of testimony, on September 23, 1986, the committee finished gathering. Nearly two of the seven days were devoted to questioning Claiborne. On September 30, 1986, the Trial Committee presented its report to the Senate.

==== Claiborne's defense ====
Former Sen. Howard Cannon, D-Nev., who had helped convince President Carter to appoint Claiborne in 1978 and who was advising Goodman during the impeachment action, said on July 24, 1986, that Claiborne wanted to use the Senate trial to publicize the misconduct charges. "His objective is to try this matter of prosecutorial and government misconduct. He wants the opportunity to present that full-blown someplace. The only place, obviously, is before the Senate."

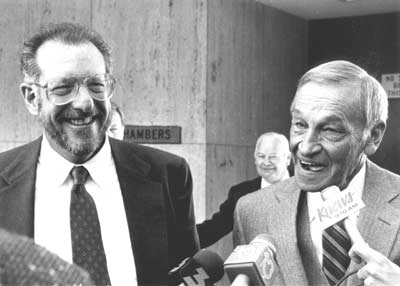
Harry Claiborne (right) during the impeachment hearings with his attorney, Oscar Goodman

Claiborne told the senate panel he had been "chased" from the bench by ambitious federal agents and that he had been wrongly convicted for willfully filing false income tax returns. "They have been pursuing me like a pack of wolves would pursue a sick caribou. I know what they have done to my family. I know what they have done to my life. I am innocent. I don't feel innocent merely. I am innocent." Although he acknowledged his 1979 and 1980 tax returns under-reported income, he blamed his tax preparers for the "brutal errors" and said he was only guilty of "neglecting my personal affairs terribly."

During the proceedings, senators frequently asked Claiborne how his taxes were prepared and how much he knew about tax law, noting that he ruled as a judge in tax cases. Sen. Warner and Nicholas Chabraja, special House counsel for the Claiborne trial, read many of Claiborne's opinions involving tax cases and indicated skepticism of Claiborne's claims that he did not know much about tax law. But Claiborne noted when he was in private practice, he never handled tax cases and never filled out his own returns. He also countered that although some of the cases he presided over as a judge may have had tax issues, they generally rested on other legal principles.

Claiborne's 1979 tax return prepared by his accountant Joseph Wright indicated that his legal fee income for the year was $41,073.93, but the tax return only reported income of $22,332.87 from legal fees. Claiborne insisted that on April 11, 1980, he directed his secretary, Judy Ahlstrom, to send a letter to Wright correcting his fee income. Ahlstrom confirmed that she dropped the letter off at Wright's office. However, Wright and his wife, Connie, who helped manage the office, testified they never got the letter. Claiborne alleged he remembered seeing it on Wright's desk. To bolster the point Claiborne's lawyer, Oscar Goodman, produced a surprise witness, Ellen Arthur, who said in an affidavit submitted on September 23, 1986, that while she was working for Wright she received an envelope from Ahlstrom containing tax papers from Claiborne. However, Arthur's affidavit did not say that she opened the envelope nor that she saw what was in it.

For his 1980 tax returns, Claiborne stopped using Wright (whom he had used for more than 30 years) and switched to a new tax preparer named Jerry Watson, owner of Creative Tax and Business Planning, who completed the returns in pencil. Claiborne admitted he had "an impression" something was wrong with his 1980 return, but claimed he did not really look at it until he was indicted in 1983. He did not find any issues with Watson reducing the taxable income from the $725,000 sale of his house in 1980, nor was he surprised to see that he would get a refund of $20,927. Claiborne estimated he would still owe the government $25,000 for 1980 and he sent a check for that amount when he applied for an extension to file his 1980 return. The $25,000 was returned along with the $20,927 refund.

Senator Larry Pressler and several other senators questioned Claiborne about why he started cashing checks at Las Vegas casinos, especially checks as large as $37,000 and $42,000, and questioned that amount of cash could fit into pockets. Claiborne responded that cashing checks at casinos was a common practice in Las Vegas and that he did it because he needed cash for repairs on his new home. He denied that he used the money for gambling or carousing, noting, "I think I'm about as colorful and flamboyant as a cold mashed potato sandwich."

A dramatic exchange occurred on September 22, 1986, when Chabraja sought to find a motive for Claiborne's underreporting of taxes in 1980. After Chabraja suggested it was greed, Claiborne quickly responded that there was nothing to indicate in "my whole professional life or my personal life that I have been greedy. I will tell you sir, your remark wounds me and I am sorry for that. Because I think you are a very fine lawyer, and it is regrettable that you would engage in such conduct, particularly in view of the fact that I have been a good judge." When Sen. Mitch McConnell asked Claiborne why he should not be removed from office, Claiborne responded, "The biggest danger I can see to the federal court is if ever there be created a buddy relationship between the federal judiciary and the executive branch."

==== Trial and conviction ====
For Claiborne's Senate trial, the Senate was arranged to resemble a courtroom with one side featuring a table with Claiborne and his lawyers, and the other side featuring the nine House managers and their special counsel, Chabraja. A speaker's stand was between the tables for each side to make arguments.

On October 7, 1986, sitting as a Court of Impeachment, the Senate heard closing arguments, including an argument by defense that the use of a trial committee was unconstitutional. Claiborne was eager to present the witnesses that could have corroborated his defense and he and his attorneys argued that by using a special committee, the Senate had denied Claiborne his constitutional right to a full trial before the entire Senate. But both a federal district judge and an appeals court panel in Washington, D.C., determined they lacked authority to adjudicate an impeachment trial. Two hours before the final vote, Chief Justice William Rehnquist denied Claiborne's request for a stay.

The Senators were close to a recess and were therefore in no mood to extend the trial hearings further. On October 8, 1986, then-Majority Leader Bob Dole moved to prevent Claiborne from presenting witnesses and instead call for a separate congressional investigation into those alleged abuses. The Senate agreed by a vote of 61–32. However, the separate probe never took place.

On October 9, 1986, the United States Senate voted on whether to convict Claiborne on all four articles of impeachment. During a typical senate vote, senators answer "aye" or "no," but during the conviction hearings senators were told to stand and say "guilty," "not guilty," or "present." Senate President Pro Tempore Strom Thurmond put the question before each roll call: "Senators, how say you: Is the respondent, Harry E. Claiborne, guilty or not guilty?" Even John Stennis, who had lost a leg to cancer two years earlier, pulled himself to a standing position each time his name was called.

The vote on the third article of impeachment held particular significance for the history of impeachment trials. Article 3 essentially stated that Claiborne's conviction by a jury trial in the district court proved that he was guilty of "misbehavior" and "high crimes." With a vote of 46 to 17 (35 voted "present"), Article 3 was the only article not to achieve the required two-thirds majority for conviction. In voting down this article, senators expressed concern that adoption might set a troublesome precedent: by declaring that a court conviction was automatic grounds for conviction in an impeachment trial, the reverse situation – an acquittal in a court trial – might require an automatic acquittal in an impeachment trial.

Articles of Impeachment, U.S. Senate judgement (A two-thirds "guilty" margin necessary for a conviction)
Article	Guilty	Not guilty	Present	Not voting
Article I	87	10	1	2
Article II	90	7	1	2
Article III	46	17	35	2
Article IV	89	8	1	2

=== Impeachment legacy ===
The historical importance of the Claiborne case came not in the debate over his guilt or innocence, which had been decided in a court of law, but in the procedural precedents set in the impeachment trial, particularly in the first use of the Senate trial committee authorised in 1935.

After the conviction, citing this use of a Senate trial committee instead of the entire Senate, Oscar Goodman said, "Harry Claiborne is no longer the fight. The fight is whether the Constitution is worth the paper it's written on. It is a fragile document. Today it was bruised if not broken." Goodman also went on to accuse several Senators of not properly reviewing the committee transcripts.

== Life after impeachment ==
Claiborne was allowed to begin practicing law again in Nevada in 1987, in a decision by the Nevada Supreme Court that implicitly questioned the federal prosecution. His attorney was future Las Vegas Mayor Oscar Goodman. Despite his tax conviction and removal from the bench, Claiborne remained respected in the Las Vegas legal community.

Claiborne was diagnosed with prostate cancer in 1990 and it later spread to his groin and spine. He had a heart attack in 1991. He treated his cancer with a combination of radiation and herbs he took three times daily. By 2003, the cancer returned to his liver, he was in considerable pain, and he had progressing Alzheimer's disease. On January 19, 2004, he killed himself in Las Vegas apparently due to his health battles. His wife, Norma Ries, said they and their 22-year-old grandson, Aaron, were in the house watching American Idol "and laughing about the people who couldn't sing. Harry said his back was hurting and he wanted to go into the den to sit down. Two minutes later my grandson and I heard a gunshot. He was in so much pain, but didn't want to go to the hospital. He was in the hospital in June, and he told me he never wanted to go back there again."

== Personal life ==
Harry Claiborne was married four times. He first married Barbara Redfield and they had three children. Claiborne later married (2nd) Lee McGuire, (3rd) Lynn O'Day, and was married for 27 years to Norma Ries.

Legal offices
Preceded by Bruce Rutherford Thompson	Judge of the United States District Court for the District of Nevada; 1978–1986	Succeeded by Philip Martin Pro
Preceded by Roger D. Foley	Chief Judge of the United States District Court for the District of Nevada; 1980–1986	Succeeded by Edward Cornelius Reed Jr.
