= Thomas Porter Hawley =

American judge (1830–1907)

Judge of the United States District Court for the District of Nevada
- In office September 9, 1890 – June 30, 1906
- Appointed by: Benjamin Harrison
- Preceded by: George Myron Sabin
- Succeeded by: Edward Silsby Farrington

Justice of the Supreme Court of Nevada
- In office 1872–1890
- Preceded by: James F. Lewis
- Succeeded by: Rensselaer R. Bigelow

Personal details
- Born: Thomas Porter Hawley; July 18, 1830 Milan, Indiana
- Died: October 7, 1907 (aged 77) San Francisco, California
- Education: read law

Thomas Porter Hawley (July 18, 1830 – October 7, 1907) was a justice of the Supreme Court of Nevada and a United States district judge of the United States District Court for the District of Nevada.

== Education and career ==
Born in Milan, Indiana, Hawley read law to enter the bar in 1857. He was in private practice in Nevada City, California from 1858 to 1868, serving as a district attorney for Nevada County, California from 1863 to 1864. He relocated his private practice to Hamilton, Nevada from 1868 to 1870, and then to Eureka, Nevada until 1872. Hawley then served as a justice of the Supreme Court of Nevada from 1872 to 1890.

== Federal judicial service ==
On August 30, 1890, Hawley was nominated by President Benjamin Harrison to a seat on the United States District Court for the District of Nevada vacated by Judge George Myron Sabin. Hawley was confirmed by the United States Senate on September 9, 1890, and received his commission the same day. Hawley retired from the bench on June 30, 1906. He died in San Francisco, California.

== Sources ==
Legal offices
| Preceded by James F. Lewis | Justice of the Supreme Court of Nevada; 1872–1890 | Succeeded by Rensselaer R. Bigelow |
| Preceded by George Myron Sabin | Judge of the United States District Court for the District of Nevada; 1890–1906 | Succeeded by Edward Silsby Farrington |
