= Treasure City, Nevada =

Treasure City
- Ghost town
- Location within the state of Nevada Treasure City (the United States)
- Coordinates: 39°13′47″N 115°28′48″W
- Country: United States
- State: Nevada
- County: White Pine
- Incorporated: March 5, 1869
- Disincorporated: January 30, 1879
- Elevation: 9,206 ft (2,806 m)

Population (2010)
  - Total: 0
- Time zone: UTC-8 (Pacific (PST))
  - Summer (DST): UTC-7 (PDT)
- GNIS feature ID: 862773

Treasure City (originally Tesora) is an abandoned mining town located in the Treasure Hill region of the White Pine Range, in western White Pine County, Nevada, United States.

== History ==
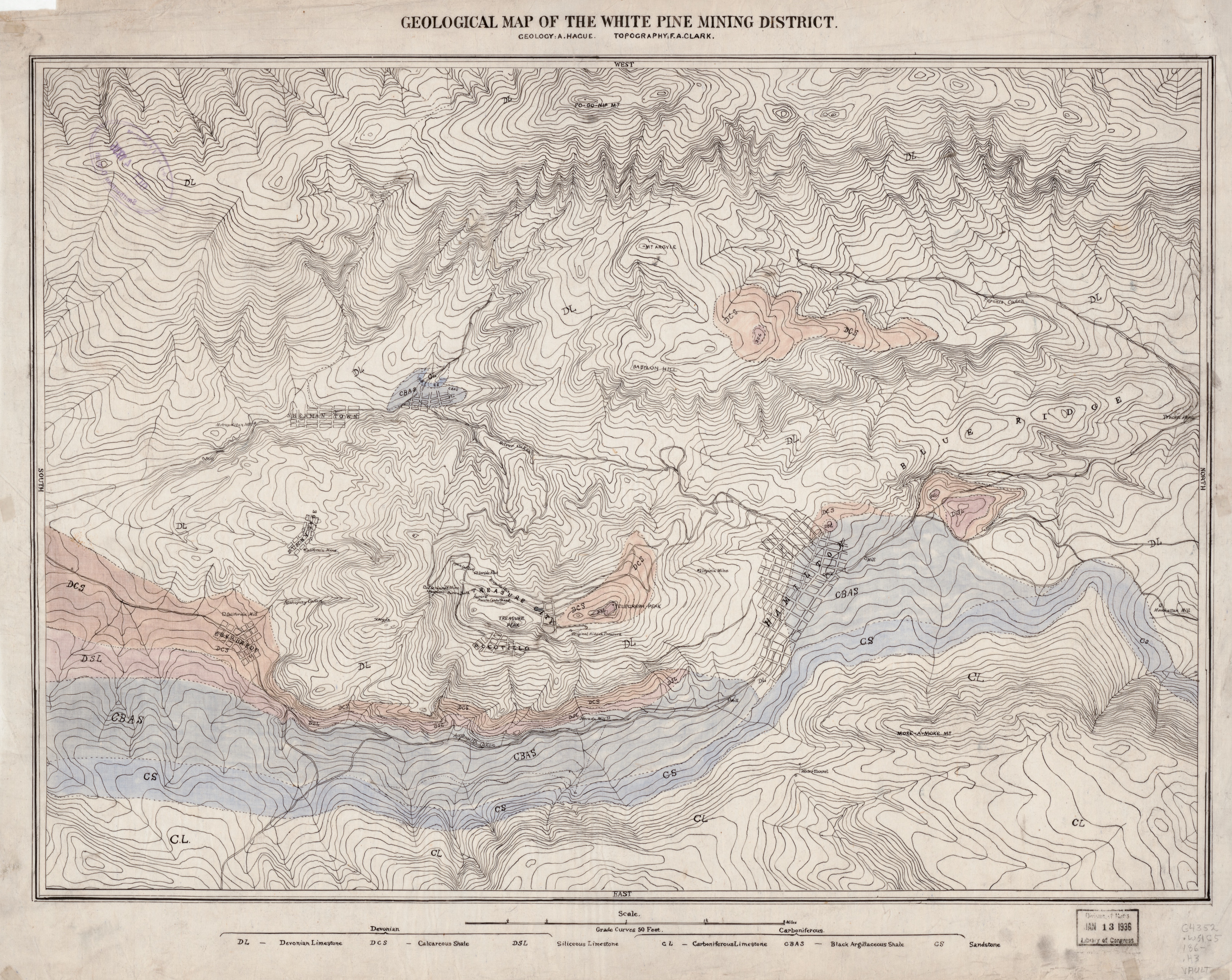
1869 geological map of mining areas in White Pine County, Nevada, showing Treasure City and nearby towns, including Hamilton and Shermantown. Map is oriented with North to the right.

Treasure City began as an encampment after the discovery of silver in the Treasure Hill area in 1867. It was incorporated on March 5, 1869, in what was then Lander County.

The post office was first opened as Tesora in April 1869 and was renamed Treasure City in June 1869.

The Treasure Hill mineral deposits were soon discovered to be much more limited than originally believed, and within only a few years the area, including Treasure City, went into decline. By 1870, the population of Treasure City, which at its peak was estimated to be as high as 7,000, was only 500. The town was disincorporated by the state legislature in 1879, its post office closed in December 1880, and by the early 1880s, was deserted.
