= State of Nevada v. Jessica Williams =

American legal case

State of Nevada v. Jessica Williams, 118 Nev. 536, was a high-profile criminal trial in the State of Nevada in which exotic dancer Jessica Williams was sentenced to 18 to 48 years in prison after falling asleep behind the wheel of her minivan, drifting onto an Interstate 15 (I-15) median north of Las Vegas, and killing six teenage county workers. The case received national media exposure and has been called "one of the most prominent Nevada cases involving a marijuana DUI."

== Incident ==
In March 2000, six teenagers, serving as a county work crew picking up freeway trash, were killed when a minivan driven by 20-year-old exotic dancer Jessica Williams drifted onto the median and plowed through them. The victims, ages 14 to 16, had been convicted of minor offenses in juvenile court, and in lieu of jail time were assigned to county cleanup crews.

== Trial ==
Williams claimed that she had simply fallen asleep at the wheel, while prosecutors contended that Williams was under the influence of marijuana and ecstasy. Prosecutors argued that Williams should be convicted of involuntary manslaughter, reckless driving and driving under the influence resulting in death. The sentence for a conviction ranged from probation with no incarceration to a prison term of 120 years with the possibility of parole.

At trial, Williams admitted that she smoked marijuana the night before the incident. However, Williams' defense attorney John Watkins argued that Williams was not under the influence of drugs at the time of the crash. While a jury found that Williams was not impaired and had simply fallen asleep, the "per se" law that allowed no detectable amount of marijuana in the body whatsoever forced a DUI conviction. Williams was found guilty of driving under the influence of marijuana and sentenced to 36 months to 90 months in prison for each of the six victims to run consecutively.

In October 2019, after serving 19 years in prison, Williams was granted parole and was released from prison. On June 18, 2020, a federal judge vacated the convictions of Williams. While vacating, U.S. District Judge Kent Dawson stated: "… this Court cannot be reasonably certain that the jury did convict based on the valid marijuana alternative for culpability rather than the constitutionally invalid marijuana metabolite alternative, regarding Williams’ convictions based upon driving with a prohibited substance in her blood. Indeed, on the record presented, it was in truth more probable that the jury convicted Williams based on the invalid marijuana metabolite alternative."
