= Edgar Winters Hillyer =

American judge (1830–1882)

Judge of the United States District Court for the District of Nevada
- In office December 21, 1869 – May 10, 1882
- Appointed by: Ulysses S. Grant
- Preceded by: Alexander W. Baldwin
- Succeeded by: George Myron Sabin

Personal details
- Born: Edgar Winters Hillyer; December 3, 1830 Granville, Ohio
- Died: May 10, 1882 (aged 51) Carson City, Nevada
- Education: Denison University read law

Edgar Winters Hillyer (December 3, 1830 – May 10, 1882) was a United States district judge of the United States District Court for the District of Nevada.

== Education and career ==
Born in Granville, Ohio, Hillyer attended Denison University. He read law to enter the bar in 1856 and was in private practice in Placer County, California from 1856 to 1861. He was a lieutenant colonel in the United States Army during the American Civil War, from 1861 to 1865, and in the JAG Corps, Department of the Pacific from 1865 to 1866. He returned to private practice in Nevada starting in 1866 and was District Attorney of Storey County, Nevada from 1866 to 1869.

== Federal judicial service ==
On December 15, 1869, Hillyer was nominated by President Ulysses S. Grant to a seat on the United States District Court for the District of Nevada vacated by Judge Alexander W. Baldwin. Hillyer was confirmed by the United States Senate on December 21, 1869. He received his commission the same day and served in that capacity until his death on May 10, 1882, in Carson City, Nevada.

== Sources ==
Legal offices
Preceded by Alexander W. Baldwin	Judge of the United States District Court for the District of Nevada; 1869–1882	Succeeded by George Myron Sabin
