= Philip Martin Pro =

American judge

Senior Judge of the United States District Court for the District of Nevada
- In office December 31, 2011 – January 23, 2015

Chief Judge of the United States District Court for the District of Nevada
- In office 2002–2007
- Preceded by: Howard D. McKibben
- Succeeded by: Roger L. Hunt

Judge of the United States District Court for the District of Nevada
- In office July 23, 1987 – December 31, 2011
- Appointed by: Ronald Reagan
- Preceded by: Harry E. Claiborne
- Succeeded by: Richard F. Boulware

Magistrate Judge of the United States District Court for the District of Nevada
- In office 1980–1987

Personal details
- Born: December 12, 1946 (age 79) Richmond, California, U.S.
- Education: Contra Costa Community College (AA); San Francisco State University (BA); Golden Gate University (JD); Duke University (LLM)

Military service
- Branch/service: United States Naval Reserve
- Years of service: 1964-1968

Philip Martin Pro (born December 12, 1946) is a former United States district judge of the United States District Court for the District of Nevada. He is currently an arbitrator and mediator in private practice.

== Education and career ==
Born in Richmond, California, Pro received an Associate of Arts degree from Contra Costa Community College in 1966, a Bachelor of Arts degree from San Francisco State University in 1968, and a Juris Doctor from Golden Gate University School of Law in 1972. He served in the United States Naval Reserve from 1964 to 1968. After serving as a law clerk to Judge William P. Compton of the Eighth Judicial District Court of Nevada from 1972 to 1973, Pro worked as a deputy public defender in Las Vegas, Nevada from 1973 to 1975. He was an Assistant United States Attorney in Las Vegas from 1975 to 1978. He was in private practice in Reno, Nevada from 1978 to 1979. He was a deputy state attorney general of Nevada from 1979 to 1980. He was the Chief Assistant United States Attorney in Reno in 1980. He served as a United States magistrate judge of the United States District Court for the District of Nevada from 1980 to 1987.

== Federal judicial service ==
Pro was nominated by President Ronald Reagan on May 5, 1987, to a seat on the United States District Court for the District of Nevada vacated by Judge Harry E. Claiborne. He was confirmed by the United States Senate on July 22, 1987, and received his commission on July 23, 1987. He served as Chief Judge from 2002 to 2007. Pro took senior status on December 31, 2011. He retired from active judicial service on January 23, 2015. While serving on the bench, he received a Master of Laws in judicial studies from Duke University School of Law in 2014.

== Post judicial service ==
Since his retirement from the federal bench, Pro has served as an arbitrator and mediator at the alternative dispute resolution firm JAMS.

== Sources ==
Legal offices
Preceded by Harry E. Claiborne	Judge of the United States District Court for the District of Nevada; 1987–2011	Succeeded by Richard F. Boulware
Preceded by Howard D. McKibben	Chief Judge of the United States District Court for the District of Nevada; 2002–2007	Succeeded by Roger L. Hunt
