= San Leandro rail collision =

Train collision in 1869

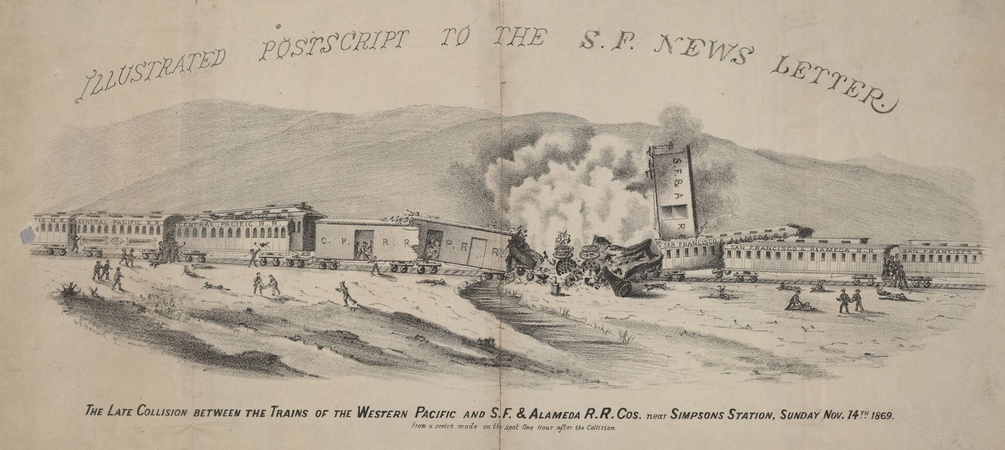
- Lithograph of the accident

Details
- Date: November 14, 1869
- Location: San Leandro, California
- Country: United States
- Line: San Francisco and Alameda Railroad
- Incident type: Head-on collision
- Cause: Human error, poor visibility

Statistics
- Trains: 2
- Deaths: 14-15

The San Leandro rail collision was the first major railroad accident to occur in California. The wreck was a collision between two passenger trains.

== Background ==
On November 14, 1869, a thick layer of fog had descended over Simpson Station in San Leandro. The switchman at this station, Bernard Kane, had been expecting two trains running in opposite directions down this line. Kane had also just been recently hired about three or four days before the crash.

The first train was a passenger express that had just left Hayward. This train was running behind schedule. The second train was a southbound passenger express that had just left Oakland.

With the Hayward train running behind and poor weather conditions, Kane was under the assumption that delayed train had already passed, but failed to check for himself. The signal showed that both trains were clear to pass despite the tracks being a single line.

== Accident ==
At some point between 8:00 and 8:30 am, the two trains collided head-on. 21 or 22 were killed in the collision. Most of these fatalities were the result of the train cars telescoping into one another, crushing the occupants to death. The wreck itself was generally described as a mixture of twisted metal and splintered wood, mixed with body parts.

The rescue response and clean-up was almost immediate. By the following day, the entirety of the wreck had already been cleared up.

Among the deceased was Alexander W. Baldwin, a district judge for Nevada.

== Aftermath ==
Bernard Kane received the initial blame for the disaster as he was the signalman that fateful day. However, after a trial, the charges of manslaughter were soon dropped against him. Eventually the single line of track through San Leandro was converted to a double track.
