= David Warner Hagen =

American judge (1931–2022)

Senior Judge of the United States District Court for the District of Nevada
- In office November 28, 2003 – March 31, 2005

Judge of the United States District Court for the District of Nevada
- In office November 22, 1993 – November 28, 2003
- Appointed by: Bill Clinton
- Preceded by: Edward Cornelius Reed Jr.
- Succeeded by: Robert Clive Jones

Personal details
- Born: October 2, 1931 Camden, Arkansas, U.S.
- Died: September 28, 2022 (aged 90) Reno, Nevada, U.S.
- Education: University of Wisconsin (BBA); University of San Francisco (LLB)

David Warner Hagen (October 2, 1931 – September 28, 2022) was a United States district judge of the United States District Court for the District of Nevada from 1993 to 2005.

== Education and career ==
Born in Camden, Arkansas, Hagen was in the United States Air Force from 1949 to 1952. He received a Bachelor of Business Administration from the University of Wisconsin in 1956 and he received a Bachelor of Laws from the University of San Francisco School of Law in 1959. He was in private practice in Berkeley, California, from 1960 to 1962. He was in private practice in Loyalton, California, from 1962 to 1963, and then in Reno, Nevada, until 1993.

== Federal judicial service ==
On October 7, 1993, Hagen was nominated by President Bill Clinton to a seat on the United States District Court for the District of Nevada vacated by Edward Cornelius Reed, Jr. Hagen was confirmed by the United States Senate on November 20, 1993, and received his commission on November 22, 1993. He assumed senior status on November 28, 2003, serving in that capacity until his retirement from the bench on March 31, 2005.

== Post judicial service ==
Hagen worked as a neutral arbitrator, mediator and court special master through Judicial Arbitration and Mediation Services ("JAMS"). In that capacity he arbitrated and mediated all manner of civil litigation, including intellectual property disputes, class-action lawsuits, gold mining claims, employment lawsuits and commercial contracts. He worked nationwide, but primarily in the Reno, Las Vegas, and San Francisco Bay areas. Hagen died on September 28, 2022, in Reno, Nevada.

== Sources ==
- at Reno Gazette-Journal

Legal offices
Preceded by Edward Cornelius Reed Jr.	Judge of the United States District Court for the District of Nevada; 1993–2003	Succeeded by Robert Clive Jones
