= Edward Cornelius Reed Jr. =

American judge

Edward C. Reed Jr.

Senior Judge of the United States District Court for the District of Nevada
- In office July 15, 1992 – June 1, 2013

Chief Judge of the United States District Court for the District of Nevada
- In office 1986–1992
- Preceded by: Harry E. Claiborne
- Succeeded by: Lloyd D. George

Judge of the United States District Court for the District of Nevada
- In office September 26, 1979 – July 15, 1992
- Appointed by: Jimmy Carter
- Preceded by: Seat established by 92 Stat. 1629
- Succeeded by: David Warner Hagen

Personal details
- Born: Edward Cornelius Reed Jr. July 8, 1924 Mason, Nevada
- Died: June 1, 2013 (aged 88) Reno, Nevada
- Education: University of Nevada, Reno (BA); Harvard Law School (JD)

Edward Cornelius Reed Jr. (July 8, 1924 – June 1, 2013) was a United States district judge of the United States District Court for the District of Nevada.

== Education and career ==
Born in Mason, Nevada, Reed received a Bachelor of Arts degree from University of Nevada, Reno in 1949. He received a Juris Doctor from Harvard Law School in 1952. He was in the United States Army from 1943 to 1946. He was a tax attorney at the firm of Arthur Andersen & Co. in Boston, Massachusetts from 1952 to 1953. He was in private practice of law in Reno, Nevada from 1953 to 1979. He was a special deputy state attorney general for water rights litigation in Nevada from 1967 to 1979.

== Federal judicial service ==
Reed was nominated by President Jimmy Carter on April 12, 1979, to the United States District Court for the District of Nevada, to a new seat created by 92 Stat. 1629. He was confirmed by the United States Senate on September 25, 1979, and received his commission on September 26, 1979. He served as Chief Judge from 1986 to 1992. He assumed senior status on July 15, 1992, serving in that capacity until his death on June 1, 2013, in Reno.

== Sources ==
Legal offices
Preceded by Seat established by 92 Stat. 1629	Judge of the United States District Court for the District of Nevada; 1979–1992	Succeeded by David Warner Hagen
Preceded by Harry E. Claiborne	Chief Judge of the United States District Court for the District of Nevada; 1986–1992	Succeeded by Lloyd D. George
