= Jennifer A. Dorsey =

American judge (born 1971)

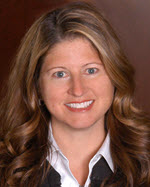

Judge of the United States District Court for the District of Nevada
- Incumbent
- Assumed office July 9, 2013
- Appointed by: Barack Obama
- Preceded by: Larry R. Hicks

Personal details
- Born: Jennifer Anna Cole; 1971 (age 54–55) Las Vegas, Nevada, U.S.
- Education: University of Nevada, Las Vegas (BA); Pepperdine University (JD)

Jennifer Anna Dorsey (née Cole; born 1971) is an American attorney and jurist serving as a United States district judge of the United States District Court for the District of Nevada.

== Early life and education ==
Dorsey was born in 1971 in Las Vegas, Nevada. She received her Bachelor of Arts degree, cum laude, in 1994 from the University of Nevada, Las Vegas. She received her Juris Doctor, cum laude, in 1997 from the Pepperdine University School of Law.

== Career ==
From January 1996 to February 1997, Dorsey was an intern for the firm Totaro & Shanahan and participated to the California Pro Bono Project.

She joined the Las Vegas law firm of Kemp, Jones & Coulthard LLP upon graduation from law school and became a partner in that firm in 2004, serving until 2013. She practiced before both state and federal courts and handled a wide variety of matters including appeals, class actions, and complex commercial litigation.

=== Federal judicial service ===
On September 19, 2012, Barack Obama nominated Dorsey to serve as a United States District Judge for the United States District Court for the District of Nevada, to the seat vacated by Judge Larry R. Hicks, who assumed senior status on December 13, 2012. On January 2, 2013, her nomination was returned to the President, due to the sine die adjournment of the Senate. On January 3, 2013, she was re-nominated to the same office. Her nomination was reported by the Senate Judiciary Committee on May 16, 2013, by a 10–8 vote. Her nomination was confirmed on July 9, 2013 by a 54–41 vote. She received her commission on the same day.

=== Notable rulings ===
In February 2019, she ruled in favor of Brock Lesnar against Mark Hunt after Lesnar won a 2017 fight but failed to pass the drug test.

In March 2019, she ruled in favor of Universal Music Group and its singer John Newman against the singer Alisa Apps, arguing that generic words and short phrases cannot be copyrighted.

In April 2019, she sentenced a man who possessed 47,000 files of child pornography to nine years in prison.

Legal offices
Preceded by Larry R. Hicks	Judge of the United States District Court for the District of Nevada; 2013–present	Incumbent
