= Frank Herbert Norcross =

American judge

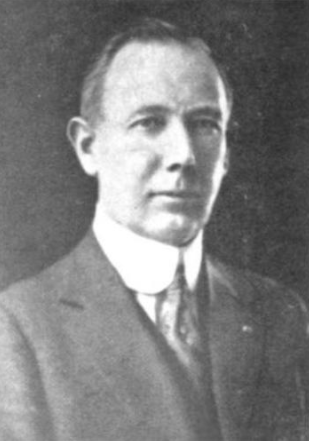

Senior Judge of the United States District Court for the District of Nevada
- In office April 30, 1945 – November 4, 1952

Judge of the United States District Court for the District of Nevada
- In office April 17, 1928 – April 30, 1945
- Appointed by: Calvin Coolidge
- Preceded by: Edward Silsby Farrington
- Succeeded by: Roger Thomas Foley

Personal details
- Born: Frank Herbert Norcross; May 11, 1869 Reno, Nevada
- Died: November 4, 1952 (aged 83) San Francisco, California
- Education: University of Nevada, Reno (A.B.); Georgetown Law (LL.B.)

Frank Herbert Norcross (May 11, 1869 – November 4, 1952) was a United States district judge of the United States District Court for the District of Nevada.

== Education and career ==
Born in Reno, Nevada, Norcross received an Artium Baccalaureus degree from the University of Nevada, Reno in 1891 and a Bachelor of Laws from Georgetown Law in 1894. He was a district attorney of Washoe County, Nevada from 1895 to 1897. He was a member of the Nevada Assembly from 1897 to 1899. He was in private practice in Reno from 1899 to 1904. Norcross became a justice of the Supreme Court of Nevada in 1904, serving until 1916, including terms as chief justice from 1909 to 1911 and from 1915 to 1916. He returned to private practice in Reno from 1917 to 1928.

== Federal judicial service ==
On April 2, 1928, Norcross was nominated by President Calvin Coolidge to a seat on the United States District Court for the District of Nevada vacated by Judge Edward Silsby Farrington. Norcross was confirmed by the United States Senate on April 17, 1928, and received his commission the same day. He assumed senior status on April 30, 1945 serving in that capacity until his death on November 4, 1952, in San Francisco, California.

== Sources ==
Legal offices
Preceded by Charles H. Belknap	Justice of the Nevada Supreme Court; 1905–1916	Succeeded by John A. Sanders
Preceded by Edward Silsby Farrington	Judge of the United States District Court for the District of Nevada; 1928–1945	Succeeded by Roger Thomas Foley
