= Howard D. McKibben =

American judge (born 1940)

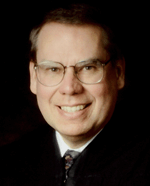

Senior Judge of the United States District Court for the District of Nevada
- Incumbent
- Assumed office April 1, 2005

Chief Judge of the United States District Court for the District of Nevada
- In office 1997–2002
- Preceded by: Lloyd D. George
- Succeeded by: Philip Martin Pro

Judge of the United States District Court for the District of Nevada
- In office October 4, 1984 – April 1, 2005
- Appointed by: Ronald Reagan
- Preceded by: Seat established by 98 Stat. 333
- Succeeded by: Brian Sandoval

Personal details
- Born: April 1, 1940 (age 86) Virginia, Illinois, U.S.
- Education: Bradley University (BS); University of Pittsburgh (MPA); University of Michigan (JD)

Howard D. McKibben (born April 1, 1940) is a senior United States district judge of the United States District Court for the District of Nevada.

== Education and career ==
McKibben was born on April 1, 1940, in Virginia, Illinois. He received a Bachelor of Science degree from Bradley University in 1962, a Master of Public Administration from the University of Pittsburgh in 1964, and a Juris Doctor from the University of Michigan Law School in 1967. He was in private practice in Minden, Nevada from 1967 to 1971. He was a deputy district attorney of Douglas County, Nevada from 1969 to 1971. He was the district attorney of Douglas County, Nevada from 1971 to 1977. He was a judge of the Ninth Judicial District Court of the State of Nevada from 1977 to 1984.

== Federal judicial service ==
McKibben was nominated by President Ronald Reagan on September 28, 1984, to the United States District Court for the District of Nevada, to a new seat created by 98 Stat. 333. He was confirmed by the United States Senate on October 4, 1984, and received his commission the same day. He served as chief judge from 1997 to 2002. He assumed senior status on April 1, 2005.

== Sources ==
Legal offices
Preceded by Seat established by 98 Stat. 333	Judge of the United States District Court for the District of Nevada; 1984–2005	Succeeded by Brian Sandoval
Preceded by Lloyd D. George	Chief Judge of the United States District Court for the District of Nevada; 1997–2002	Succeeded by Philip Martin Pro
