= Richard F. Boulware =

American judge (born 1968)

Richard Franklin Boulware II
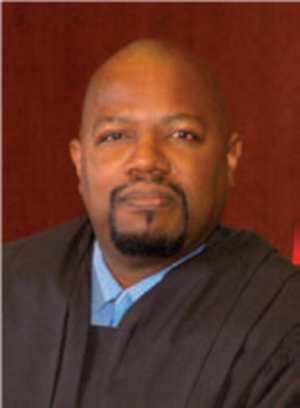

Judge of the United States District Court for the District of Nevada
- Incumbent
- Assumed office June 10, 2014
- Appointed by: Barack Obama
- Preceded by: Philip Martin Pro

Personal details
- Born: Richard Franklin Boulware II; 1968 (age 57–58) Rochester, Minnesota, U.S.
- Education: Harvard University (BA); Columbia University (JD)

Richard Franklin Boulware II (born 1968) is a United States district judge of the United States District Court for the District of Nevada and former assistant Federal Public Defender.

== Biography ==
Boulware received an Artium Baccalaureus degree, cum laude, in 1993 from Harvard College and studied toward a Doctor of Philosophy in Sociology from 1995 to 1998. He received a Juris Doctor in 2002 from Columbia Law School.

From 2002 to 2003, he served as a law clerk to Judge Denise Cote of the United States District Court for the Southern District of New York. From 2003 to 2007, he was a trial attorney in the Federal Public Defender's Office in New York City. He served in the Federal Public Defender's Office in Las Vegas from 2007 to 2014, serving as the lead attorney for complex white-collar cases from 2010 to 2014.

=== Federal judicial service ===
On January 16, 2014, President Barack Obama nominated Boulware to serve as a district judge of the United States District Court for the District of Nevada to the seat vacated by Judge Philip Martin Pro, who assumed senior status on December 31, 2011. He received a hearing before the United States Senate Committee on the Judiciary on March 12, 2014. On April 3, 2014, his nomination was reported out of committee by a 11–7 vote.

On June 5, 2014, Senate Majority Leader Harry Reid filed for cloture on the nomination. On June 9, 2014, the United States Senate invoked cloture by a 53–34 vote. On June 10, 2014, his nomination was confirmed by a 58–35 vote. He received his judicial commission the same day. He was sworn in on June 12, 2014.

In 2015, Boulware began hearing a high-profile antitrust lawsuit against the Ultimate Fighting Championship filed by several of its former fighters. The fighters allege that the UFC "unlawfully monopolized the market for mixed martial arts promotion by, among other things, locking up fighters with exclusive contracts and acquiring its rivals, leading to suppressed compensation for the fighters". The UFC is fighting the suit, alleging that it is "meritless." In September 2020, Boulware indicated he was "likely" to grant class-action status to the suit.

In May 2022, he vacated Margaret Rudin’s murder conviction after she had spent 20 years in prison. Boulware ruled that Rudin received ineffective legal representation from her late defense attorney.

== Nomination to United States Sentencing Commission ==
On September 9, 2015, President Obama nominated Boulware to a position on the United States Sentencing Commission. He would have replaced former Commissioner Ketanji Brown Jackson and his term would have expired October 31, 2019. His nomination expired at the end of the 114th Congress.

== See also ==
- List of African-American federal judges
- List of African-American jurists

Legal offices
Preceded by Philip Martin Pro	Judge of the United States District Court for the District of Nevada; 2014–present	Incumbent
