= Edward Silsby Farrington =

American judge

Senior Judge of the United States District Court for the District of Nevada
- In office April 30, 1928 – August 31, 1929

Judge of the United States District Court for the District of Nevada
- In office January 10, 1907 – April 30, 1928
- Appointed by: Theodore Roosevelt
- Preceded by: Thomas Porter Hawley
- Succeeded by: Frank Herbert Norcross

Personal details
- Born: Edward Silsby Farrington; September 6, 1856 Yreka, California
- Died: August 31, 1929 (aged 72)
- Education: Amherst College (A.B.); University of California, Hastings; College of the Law

Edward Silsby Farrington (September 6, 1856 – August 31, 1929) was a United States district judge of the United States District Court for the District of Nevada.

== Education and career ==
Born in Yreka, California, Farrington received an Artium Baccalaureus degree from Amherst College in 1880 and attended the University of California, Hastings College of the Law. He was in private practice in Elko, Nevada from 1886 to 1907.

== Federal judicial service ==
On December 19, 1906, Farrington was nominated by President Theodore Roosevelt to a seat on the United States District Court for the District of Nevada vacated by Judge Thomas Porter Hawley. Farrington was confirmed by the United States Senate on January 10, 1907, and received his commission the same day. He assumed senior status on April 30, 1928, serving in that capacity until his death on August 31, 1929.

== Sources ==
Legal offices
Preceded by Thomas Porter Hawley	Judge of the United States District Court for the District of Nevada; 1907–1928	Succeeded by Frank Herbert Norcross
