= Andrew P. Gordon =

American judge (born 1962)

Andrew Gordon
- Gordon in 2014

Chief Judge of the United States District Court for the District of Nevada
- Incumbent
- Assumed office October 1, 2024
- Preceded by: Miranda Du

Judge of the United States District Court for the District of Nevada
- Incumbent
- Assumed office March 12, 2013
- Appointed by: Barack Obama
- Preceded by: Kent Dawson

Personal details
- Born: Andrew Patrick Gordon; 1962 (age 62–63) San Francisco, California, U.S.
- Education: Claremont McKenna College (BA); Harvard University (JD)

Andrew Patrick Gordon (born in 1962) is the chief United States district judge of the United States District Court for the District of Nevada.

== Biography ==
Gordon was born in 1962, in San Francisco. Gordon received his Bachelor of Arts degree, cum laude, in 1984 from Claremont McKenna College. He received his Juris Doctor in 1987 from Harvard Law School. He worked at the law firm of Streich, Lang, Weeks and Cardon from 1987 to 1992. He then worked at the law firm of Dawson and Associates from 1992 to 1994. He was partner from 1997 to 2013 at McDonald, Carano and Wilson LLP, having joined that firm in 1994. His career focused on civil litigation and alternative dispute resolution with a primary emphasis on complex commercial disputes. He regularly served as an arbitrator and mediator.

== Federal judicial service ==
On September 19, 2012, President Barack Obama nominated Gordon to serve as a United States District Judge for the United States District Court for the District of Nevada, to the seat vacated by Judge Kent Dawson who took senior status on July 9, 2012. On January 2, 2013, his nomination was returned to the President, due to the sine die adjournment of the Senate. On January 3, 2013, he was renominated to the same office. His nomination was reported by the Senate Judiciary Committee on February 14, 2013, by voice vote. The Senate confirmed Gordon in a voice vote on March 11, 2013. He received his commission on March 12, 2013. He became chief judge in 2024.

=== Notable rulings ===
In 2015, Gordon authored one of the few opinions addressing the Third Amendment to the United States Constitution which states "No Soldier shall, in time of peace be quartered in any house, without the consent of the Owner, nor in time of war, but in a manner to be prescribed by law." The case of Mitchell v. City of Henderson questioned whether police officers who forcibly entered the homes of plaintiffs and who stayed for a significant amount of time to gain a tactical advantage on a subject violated the Third Amendment. Gordon ultimately found that a policeman is not a soldier in the meaning of the Third Amendment and therefore found no violation under that provision of the Constitution. Even if they were, Gordon suggested that a separate inquiry was needed to determine whether the hours spent in the home by the officers constituted quartering. Though he declined to rule whether it was or wasn't, he was more likely to find that it was not and that additional time would be needed to meet the threshold.

Legal offices
Preceded by Kent Dawson	Judge of the United States District Court for the District of Nevada; 2013–present	Incumbent
Preceded by Miranda Du	Chief Judge of the United States District Court for the District of Nevada; 2024–present	Incumbent
