= Cristina D. Silva =

American judge (born 1979)

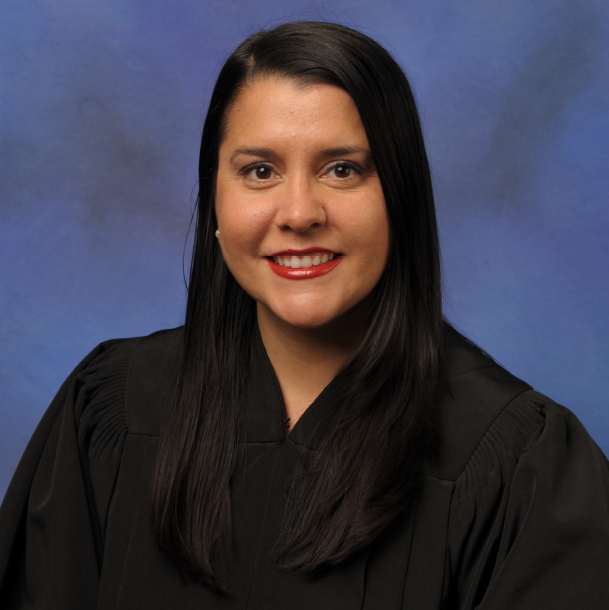

Judge of the United States District Court for the District of Nevada
- Incumbent
- Assumed office April 7, 2022
- Appointed by: Joe Biden
- Preceded by: James C. Mahan

Judge of the Eighth Nevada Judicial District Court, Department IX
- In office 2019 – April 7, 2022
- Appointed by: Steve Sisolak
- Preceded by: Jennifer P. Togliatti
- Succeeded by: Maria A. Gall

Personal details
- Born: 1979 (age 46–47) El Paso, Texas, U.S.
- Education: Wellesley College (BA); American University (JD)

Cristina Dionne Silva (born 1979) is a United States district judge of the United States District Court for the District of Nevada.

== Education ==
Silva received her Bachelor of Arts degree from Wellesley College in 2001. She received her Juris Doctor degree from the Washington College of Law in 2007.

== Career ==
From 2007 until 2010, Silva worked as an assistant state attorney in the Miami-Dade State Attorney's Office, serving as assistant chief of litigation for the domestic violence unit in 2010. From 2011 to 2019, she served as an Assistant United States Attorney in the United States Attorney's Office for the District of Nevada. She was deputy chief of the criminal division from 2013 to 2018 and chief of the criminal division from 2018 to 2019. During her time as a federal prosecutor, Silva assisted with the criminal investigation into the 2017 Las Vegas shooting that killed 58 people in the initial shooting and injured about 500 others. In the years after, two more victims have died of shooting-related injuries.

From 2019 to 2022, Silva served as a judge on the Eighth Judicial District Court, Department IX, in Clark County after being appointed by Nevada Governor Steve Sisolak.

=== Federal judicial service ===
On November 3, 2021, President Joe Biden nominated Silva to serve as a United States district judge of the United States District Court for the District of Nevada. President Biden nominated Silva to the seat vacated by Judge James C. Mahan, who assumed senior status on June 29, 2018. On December 15, 2021, a hearing on her nomination was held before the Senate Judiciary Committee. On January 3, 2022, her nomination was returned to the President under Rule XXXI, Paragraph 6 of the United States Senate; she was later renominated the same day. On January 20, 2022, her nomination was reported out of committee by a 12–10 vote. On March 16, 2022, the Senate invoked cloture on her nomination by a 53–44 vote. On March 23, 2022, her nomination was confirmed by a 50–46 vote. She received her judicial commission on April 7, 2022.

== See also ==
- List of Hispanic and Latino American jurists

Legal offices
| Preceded by James C. Mahan | Judge of the United States District Court for the District of Nevada; 2022–present | Incumbent |
