= John Rolly Ross =

American judge

Chief Judge of the United States District Court for the District of Nevada
- In office 1961–1963
- Preceded by: Roger Thomas Foley
- Succeeded by: Roger D. Foley

Judge of the United States District Court for the District of Nevada
- In office May 15, 1954 – April 22, 1963
- Appointed by: Dwight D. Eisenhower
- Preceded by: Seat established by 68 Stat. 8
- Succeeded by: Bruce Rutherford Thompson

Personal details
- Born: John Rolly Ross; March 1, 1899 Boston, Massachusetts
- Died: April 22, 1963 (aged 64)
- Party: Republican
- Education: University of Nevada, Reno (A.B.); Stanford Law School (J.D.)

John Rolly Ross (March 1, 1899 – April 22, 1963) was a United States district judge of the United States District Court for the District of Nevada.

== Education and career ==
Born in Boston, Massachusetts, Ross graduated from Lyon County High School, Nevada. He was in the United States Army in World War I and served in France. Upon return, he received an Artium Baccalaureus degree from the University of Nevada, Reno in 1923 and a Juris Doctor from Stanford Law School in 1926. He was in private practice from 1926 to 1954. He was district attorney of Lyon County from 1927 to 1929 and a city attorney of Yerington, Nevada from 1929 to 1939. He was the Republican State Chairman in 1934, and was city attorney of Carson City, Nevada from 1947 to 1951. He was a member of the Governor's Legislative Counsel in 1947, 1951, and 1953.

== Federal judicial service ==
On May 3, 1954, Ross was nominated by President Dwight D. Eisenhower to a new seat on the United States District Court for the District of Nevada created by 68 Stat. 8. He was confirmed by the United States Senate on May 13, 1954, and received his commission on May 15, 1954. He served as Chief Judge from 1961 until his death on April 22, 1963.

== Sources ==
Legal offices
Preceded by Seat established by 68 Stat. 8	Judge of the United States District Court for the District of Nevada; 1954–1963	Succeeded by Bruce Rutherford Thompson
Preceded by Roger Thomas Foley	Chief Judge of the United States District Court for the District of Nevada; 1961–1963	Succeeded by Roger D. Foley
