= Courts of Nevada =

Courts of Nevada include:

State courts of Nevada

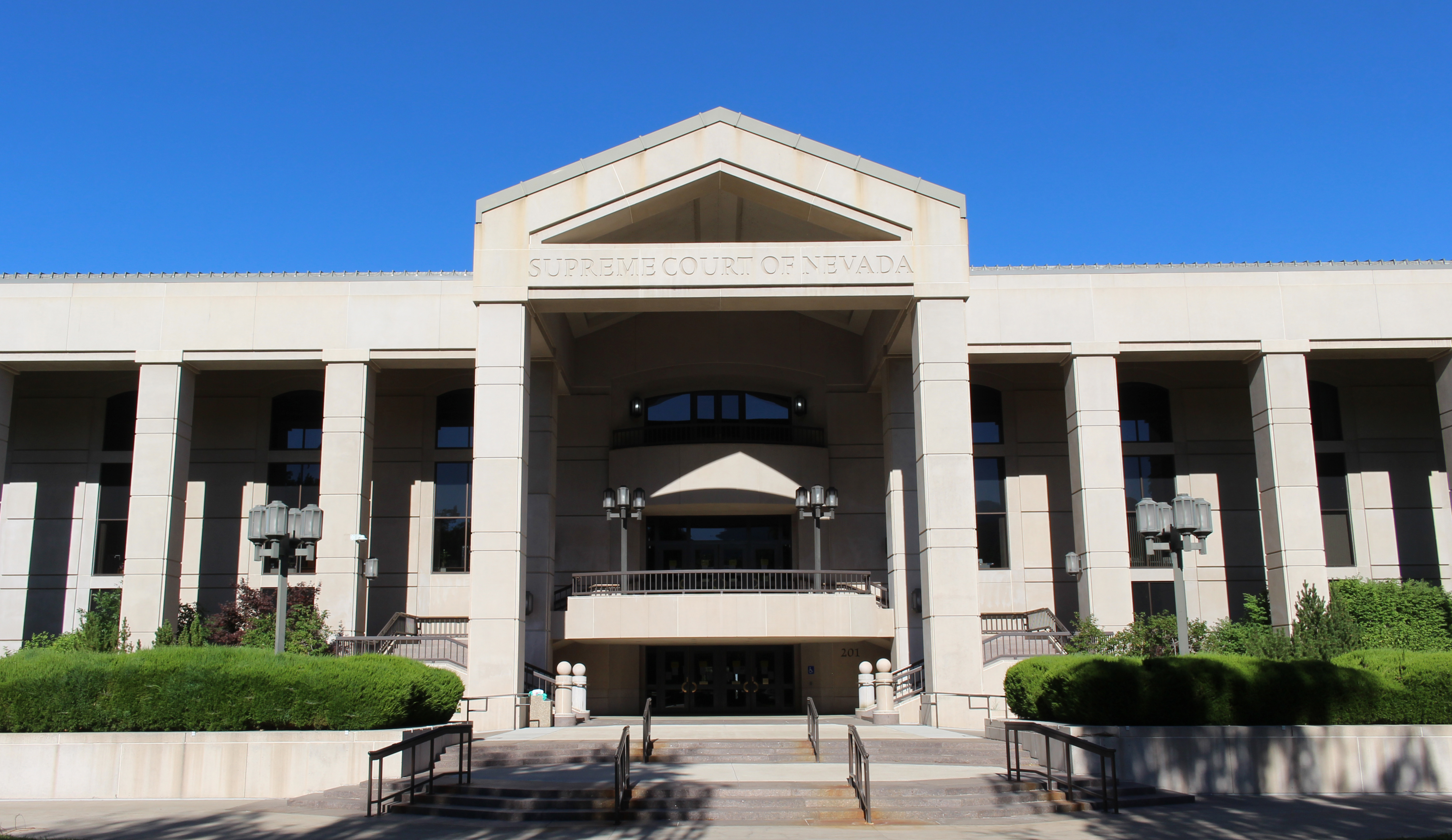
The headquarters of the Supreme Court of Nevada in Carson City.

- Supreme Court of Nevada
  - Nevada Court of Appeals
    - District Courts of Nevada (11 districts)
      - Municipal Courts of Nevada
      - Justice Courts of Nevada

Federal courts located in Nevada

- United States District Court for the District of Nevada

== See also ==
- Judiciary of Nevada
