= Nicholas Chabraja =

Nicholas D. Chabraja (pronounced cha-BRI-ya) (born November 6, 1942, in Gary, Indiana) is a Serbian - American lawyer and former chief executive officer of General Dynamics Corporation.

== Early life and education ==
Chabraja earned his undergraduate degree from Northwestern University in 1964 and received his law degree from the university in 1967.

== Career ==
He joined Jenner & Block in 1968 and worked there until 1993. In 1986, during the impeachment trial of Judge Harry Caliborne, Chabraja was appointed special trial counsel to the United States House of Representatives. He joined General Dynamics in 1993 as general counsel and retired as CEO in 2009.

In 2009, he was included in the list of the 24 "TopGun CEOs" in the US, published by Brendan Wood International, an advisory agency.
