= Lloyd D. George =

American judge (1930–2020)

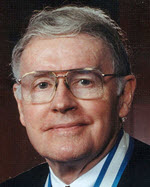

Senior Judge of the United States District Court for the District of Nevada
- In office December 1, 1997 – October 7, 2020

Chief Judge of the United States District Court for the District of Nevada
- In office 1992–1997
- Preceded by: Edward Cornelius Reed Jr.
- Succeeded by: Howard D. McKibben

Judge of the United States District Court for the District of Nevada
- In office May 3, 1984 – December 1, 1997
- Appointed by: Ronald Reagan
- Preceded by: Roger D. Foley
- Succeeded by: Johnnie B. Rawlinson

Judge of the Bankruptcy Appellate Panel for the Ninth Circuit
- In office 1980–1984
- Appointed by: Ninth Circuit

Judge of the United States Bankruptcy Court for the District of Nevada
- In office 1974–1984
- Appointed by: Ninth Circuit

Personal details
- Born: Lloyd Dee George; February 22, 1930 Montpelier, Idaho, U.S.
- Died: October 7, 2020 (aged 90) Las Vegas, Nevada, U.S.
- Education: Brigham Young University (B.S.); UC Berkeley School of Law (J.D.)

Lloyd Dee George (February 22, 1930 – October 7, 2020) was a United States district judge of the United States District Court for the District of Nevada and the namesake of the Lloyd D. George Federal Courthouse in Las Vegas, Nevada.

== Education and career ==
Born in Montpelier, Idaho, George was raised in Las Vegas, Nevada, and was the class president of the 1948 class of Las Vegas High School. He received a Bachelor of Science degree from Brigham Young University in 1955. After graduation, and upon completing the requirements of the Air Force Reserve Officer Training Corps, he was commissioned as an officer in the United States Air Force and served from 1955 to 1958. In the Air Force, he flew Boeing B-47 Stratojet long-range bombers and became a captain.

After serving in the Air Force, he received a Juris Doctor from the University of California, Berkeley, Boalt Hall School of Law in 1961. He was in private practice in Las Vegas from 1961 to 1974, and was also a justice of the peace for Clark County, Nevada from 1962 to 1969.

== Federal judicial service ==
George was a United States Bankruptcy Judge for the District of Nevada from 1974 to 1984, serving on the Ninth Circuit United States Bankruptcy Appellate Panels from 1980 to 1984.

On April 18, 1984, George was nominated by President Ronald Reagan to a seat on the United States District Court for the District of Nevada vacated by Judge Roger D. Foley. George was confirmed by the United States Senate on April 30, 1984, and received his commission on May 3, 1984. He served as Chief Judge from 1992 to 1997, and assumed senior status on December 1, 1997. He died on October 7, 2020.

In 1996, George was selected to represent the U.S. Court of Appeals for the Ninth Circuit as a member of the Judicial Conference of the United States, the national policy-making and management body of the federal judiciary. That year, Chief Justice Rehnquist appointed him to the Conference’s Executive Committee. Prior to his appointment to the Judicial Conference, he served for a number of years on three Judicial Conference committees and was the chair of two. While serving on the International Judicial Relations Committee from 1993 to 1997, he and other judicial colleagues from various countries participated in numerous seminars and lectured on constitutional issues and court structure in Eastern Europe and the nations of the former Soviet Union. In 1996, he chaired a committee that worked to update the long-range national plan for the judiciary. He was also a board member of the Federal Judicial Center (the education and research arm of the federal judiciary) where he served for four years with Chief Justice Warren Burger.

== Other public service ==
George served for a time as president of the National Conference of Christians and Jews and the Clark County Association for Retarded Children, which became Opportunity Village. He also served on the Federal Bar Association of Clark County and the Professional Association of Southern Nevada. And, he served as chairman of the Thomas & Mack Legal Clinic Advisory Board at the Boyd School of Law.

== Religion and honors ==
George was a member of the Church of Jesus Christ of Latter-day Saints. He served as a missionary in Wisconsin and Illinois for the Church. The Lloyd D. George Federal Courthouse in Las Vegas, Nevada is named in his honor as well as the State Bar of Nevada's Lloyd D. George Professionalism Award and the William S. Boyd School of Law's Judge Lloyd George Bankruptcy Moot Court Competition.

== Awards and honors ==
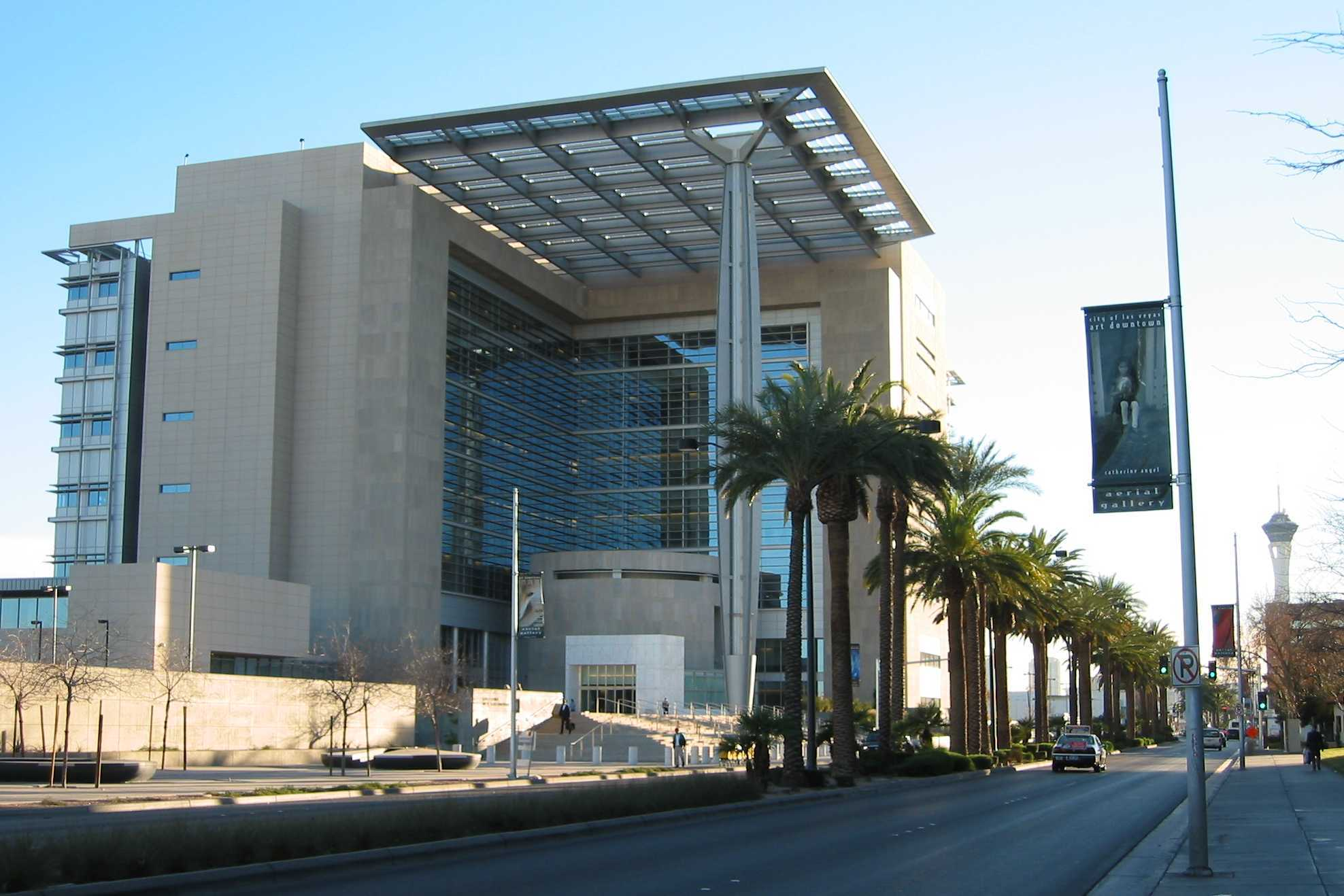
The Lloyd D. George Federal Courthouse is located in Las Vegas, Nevada.

- Alumni Distinguished Service Award, Brigham Young University (1980)
- Silver Beaver Award, Boy Scouts of America
- Liberty Bell Award, Clark County Law Foundation
- Presidential Citation, Brigham Young University (2001)
- Judge D. Lowell & Barbara Jensen Public Service Award, Boalt Hall, University of California, Berkeley (2005)
- John C Mowbray Humanitarian of the Year Award, Notre Dame Club
- Jurist of the Year Award, Federal Bar Association
- Champion of a Lifetime Award, Clark County Law Foundation (2016)

== Sources ==
- Church News, December 9, 2000.

Legal offices
| Preceded by Roger D. Foley | Judge of the United States District Court for the District of Nevada; 1984–1997 | Succeeded by Johnnie B. Rawlinson |
| Preceded by Edward Cornelius Reed Jr. | Chief Judge of the United States District Court for the District of Nevada; 1992–1997 | Succeeded by Howard D. McKibben |
