= Alexander W. Baldwin =

American judge (1835–1869)

Judge of the United States District Court for the District of Nevada
- In office March 11, 1865 – November 14, 1869
- Appointed by: Abraham Lincoln
- Preceded by: Seat established by 13 Stat. 440
- Succeeded by: Edgar Winters Hillyer

Personal details
- Born: June 1835 Gainesville, Alabama
- Died: November 14, 1869 (aged 33) Alameda, California
- Parent: Joseph G. Baldwin (father)
- Education: read law

Alexander White Baldwin (June 1835 – November 14, 1869), frequently known as A. W. Baldwin, was a United States district judge of the United States District Court for the District of Nevada.

== Education and career ==
Born in June 1835, in Gainesville, Alabama, Baldwin read law. He entered private practice in Virginia City, Utah Territory from 1858 to 1859. He was prosecutor of Storey County, Utah Territory (Nevada Territory from March 2, 1861) starting in 1859. He resumed private practice in Virginia City, Nevada Territory (State of Nevada from October 31, 1864) until 1865.

== Federal judicial service ==
Baldwin was nominated by President Abraham Lincoln on March 10, 1865, to the United States District Court for the District of Nevada, to a new seat authorized by 13 Stat. 440. He was confirmed by the United States Senate on March 11, 1865, and received his commission the same day. His service terminated on November 14, 1869, due to his death in Alameda, California, as a result of a railroad accident.

== Personal life ==
Baldwin's father, Joseph G. Baldwin, was also an attorney who served as an Associate Justice of the California Supreme Court.

Baldwin died as the result of a railway accident at San Leandro, California (near Alameda) on November 14, 1869, at the age of 33.

== Sources ==
Legal offices
Preceded by Seat established by 13 Stat. 440	Judge of the United States District Court for the District of Nevada; 1865–1869	Succeeded by Edgar Winters Hillyer
