= James C. Mahan =

American judge (born 1943)

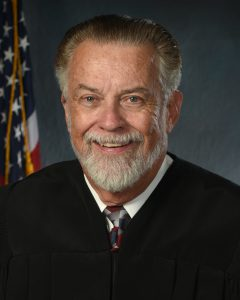

Senior Judge of the United States District Court for the District of Nevada
- Incumbent
- Assumed office June 29, 2018

Judge of the United States District Court for the District of Nevada
- In office January 30, 2002 – June 29, 2018
- Appointed by: George W. Bush
- Preceded by: Seat established by 114 Stat. 2762
- Succeeded by: Cristina D. Silva

Personal details
- Born: James Cameron Mahan; December 16, 1943 (age 82) El Paso, Texas, U.S.
- Education: Morris Harvey College (BA); Vanderbilt University (JD)

James Cameron Mahan (born December 16, 1943) is a senior United States district judge of the United States District Court for the District of Nevada.

== Education and career ==
Mahan was born in El Paso, Texas. He received a Bachelor of Arts degree from Morris Harvey College in 1965 and a Juris Doctor from Vanderbilt University Law School in 1973. He was in the United States Navy from 1966 to 1969. He was in the United States Navy Reserve from 1970 to 1972. He was in private practice in Nevada from 1973 to 1999. He was a District Judge in the Eighth Judicial District Court for the State of Nevada (which covers Clark County, Nevada) from 1999 to 2002.

=== Federal judicial service ===
Mahan was nominated by President George W. Bush on September 10, 2001, to serve as a United States district judge of the United States District Court for the District of Nevada. He was nominated to a new seat created by 114 Stat. 2762. He was confirmed by the United States Senate on January 25, 2002, and received his commission on January 30, 2002. He assumed senior status on June 29, 2018. In 2006, Mahan was investigated by the Ninth Circuit Court of Appeals after it became known that he had awarded a total of nearly $5 million in court awards and fees to individuals with whom he had personal and business relationships. The Ninth Circuit's special committee unanimously recommended that the complaint be dismissed, finding no misconduct.

== Notable cases ==
=== Nevada same-sex marriage ban ===
On October 9, 2014, Judge Mahan issued an injunction barring enforcement of Nevada's ban on same-sex marriage. A different judge of the Nevada District Court upheld Nevada's same-sex marriage ban in 2012, but was reversed by the Ninth Circuit Court of Appeals and remanded. The judge recused himself and the case was assigned to Mahan, who promptly issued the injunction.

=== Attempted assassination of Donald Trump ===
On June 18, 2016, an attempt was made to assassinate the presumptive Republican nominee for the 2016 United States presidential election, Donald Trump, in the final weeks of the Republican presidential primaries by Michael Steven Sandford, a British national.

Sandford was arraigned on July 7, 2016, pleading not guilty. His trial was set for August 22, 2016. On September 13, 2016, Sandford pled guilty in the United States District Court for the District of Nevada to charges of being an illegal alien in possession of a firearm and disrupting an official function. Before his trial, Sandford had signed a plea agreement that reduced his maximum sentence from 20 years to 27 months. A third charge of being an illegal alien in possession of a firearm was dropped. Sandford apologized for his actions, saying "I know saying sorry is not enough. I do feel awful about what I did. I wish there was some way to make things better. I have cost taxpayers so much money. I feel terrible." Sandford subsequently claimed to have no memory of the assassination attempt.

Sandford was sentenced on December 13, 2016, receiving 12 months and 1 day's imprisonment. He will be eligible for release in April 2017, at which time he will be deported. The sentencing judge, James C. Mahan, acknowledged Sandford's mental health issues, stating "I don't think you harbored malice in your heart...You have a medical problem...I don't see you as evil or a sociopath". In January 2017, Sandford's mother expressed concerns that President Trump would seek to extend Sandford's sentence, and claimed that Sandford was being harassed by "Trump-supporting guards and inmates". Sandford was released from prison and deported on May 5, 2017 and has been permanently removed from the U.S.

== See also ==
- United States v. Camacho

== Sources ==
Legal offices
Preceded by Seat established by 114 Stat. 2762	Judge of the United States District Court for the District of Nevada; 2002–2018	Succeeded by Cristina D. Silva
