= Bruce Rutherford Thompson =

American judge

Senior Judge of the United States District Court for the District of Nevada
- In office August 31, 1978 – February 10, 1992

Judge of the United States District Court for the District of Nevada
- In office August 16, 1963 – August 31, 1978
- Appointed by: John F. Kennedy
- Preceded by: John Rolly Ross
- Succeeded by: Harry E. Claiborne

Personal details
- Born: Bruce Rutherford Thompson; July 31, 1911 Reno, Nevada
- Died: February 10, 1992 (aged 80)
- Education: University of Nevada, Reno (A.B.); Stanford Law School (LL.B.)

Bruce Rutherford Thompson (July 31, 1911 – February 10, 1992) was a United States district judge of the United States District Court for the District of Nevada.

== Education and career ==
Born in Reno, Nevada, Thompson received an Artium Baccalaureus degree from the University of Nevada, Reno in 1932 and a Bachelor of Laws from Stanford Law School in 1936. He was in private practice in Reno from 1936 to 1963, serving as an Assistant United States Attorney of the District of Nevada from 1942 to 1952, and as a Special Master for the United States District Court for the District of Nevada from 1952 to 1954.

== Federal judicial service ==
On July 9, 1963, Thompson was nominated by President John F. Kennedy to a seat on the United States District Court for the District of Nevada vacated by Judge John Rolly Ross. Thompson was confirmed by the United States Senate on August 6, 1963, and received his commission on August 16, 1963. He assumed senior status on August 31, 1978, serving in that capacity until his death on February 10, 1992.

== Honor ==
The Bruce R. Thompson United States Courthouse in Reno was named for Thompson.

== Personal ==
Thompson's brother, Gordon R. Thompson, was a Justice of the Supreme Court of Nevada from 1961 to 1980.

== Sources ==
Legal offices
Preceded by John Rolly Ross	Judge of the United States District Court for the District of Nevada; 1963–1978	Succeeded by Harry E. Claiborne
