= Treasure Hill (White Pine County, Nevada) =

Site of 1860s silver mining boom

Coordinates: 39°13′38″N 115°28′48″W

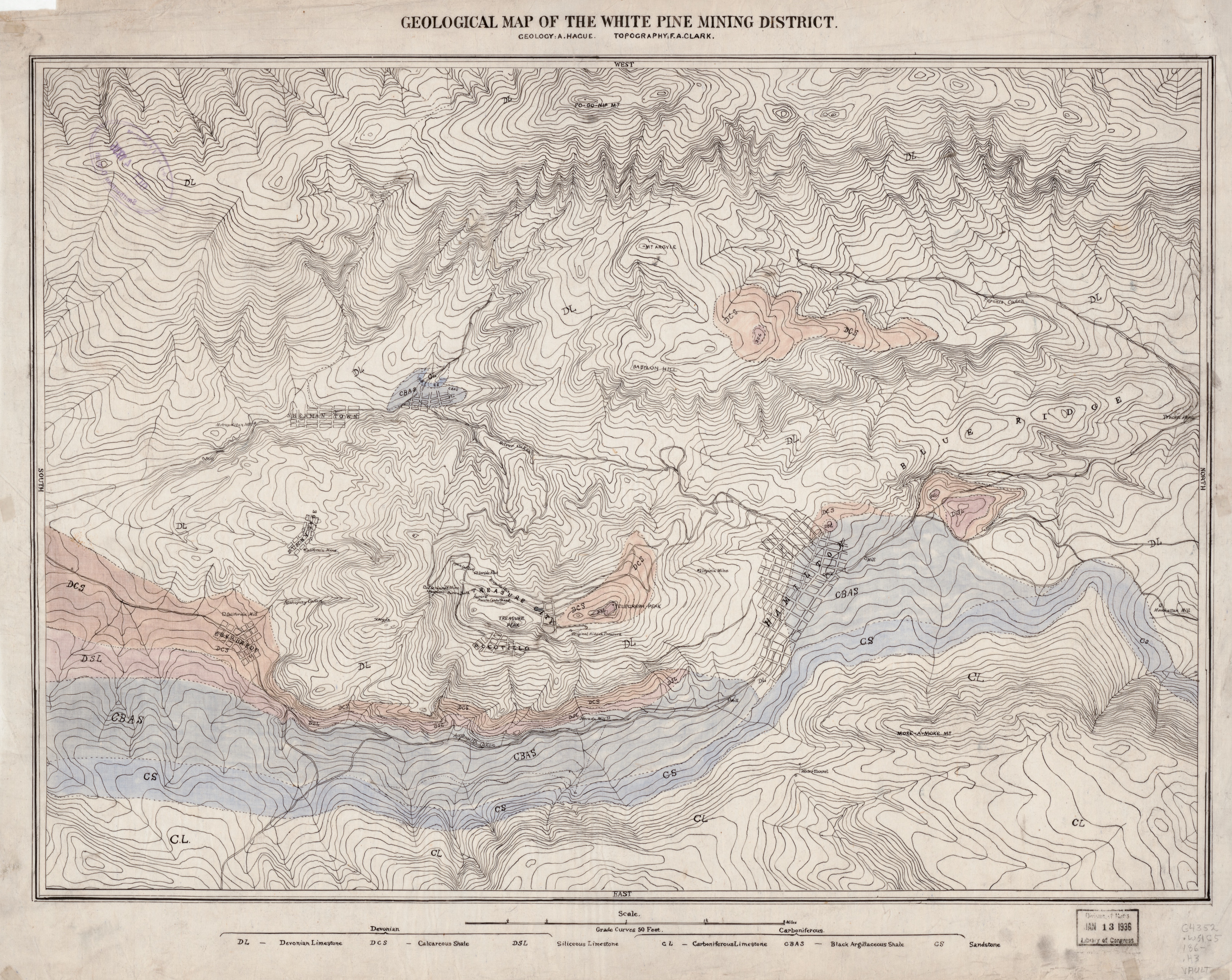
1869 geological map of mining areas in White Pine County, Nevada, showing Treasure Hill and nearby towns, including Hamilton, Treasure City, and Shermantown. Map is oriented with North to the right.

Treasure Hill is an east-jutting spur of the White Pine Range of White Pine County in the east central region of the U.S. state of Nevada. It lies to the east of Mount Hamilton and to the northwest of Mokomoke Hill. It is noted for a silver mining boom in the late 1860s: between 1867 and 1880, the total production from area mines was valued at $20 million (equivalent to $556 million in 2024). The rush drew thousands to new towns such as Hamilton, situated at the northern base of the hill, and Treasure City, located near its peak, 2.5 miles (4.0 km) from Hamilton.

By early 1881, mining activity collapsed, as it was dependent on deposits and not on lasting silver-bearing geological veins. As a result, by 1888, there were only 24 people living there, and the principal towns of Hamilton, Treasure City, and Shermantown faded into oblivion.

== History ==
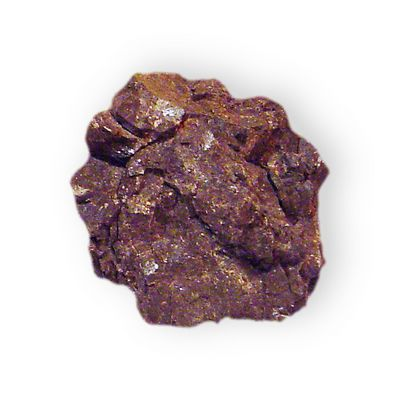
Normal aurorite in calcite with pyrolusite Hydrous silver calcium manganese oxide, from Aurora Mine in the Treasure Hill district

The first expedition to the area was by Austin-based explorers, who found copper, lead, antimony, and iron; exploration was started by the Monte Cristo Mining Company. But in the autumn of the same year, silver deposits were found in the region. This was a chance discovery, as a Native American known as "Napias Jim" (napias meaning silver or money in the Shoshoni language) had shown the rich ore taken from a location in the region to his friend A. J. Lesthers, a blacksmith, who converted it into a silver button. (The value of silver at the time was $1.32 per ounce.) The area where the ore was found became the Hidden Treasure Mine; the yield from one ton of ore from this mine was worth $500–800. The next mine yielded $800–$1,000 per ton of ore and the third mine proved to a bonanza of pure silver, a "putty", with a yield potential of $15,000-20,000 per ton of ore.

This discovery in the spring of 1868 of silver ore on Treasure Hill led to a prosperous but short-lived boom, later described as the "shortest and most intense mining rush." The hill was named after the notable ore discoveries. Staking fever ensued, with "every boomer, promoter, card shark, merchant-capitalist, prostitute and prospector in the West" making a beeline to Treasure Hill. The crest of the hill was a barren, windswept land before many claimants established their stores, with mining claims and drilling sites every few feet.

A series of towns with populations up to 10,000 people grew up in the county, fueled by the prosperity of the silver mining on Treasure Hill. With the wealth that the industry on Treasure Hill produced, the early prospectors were said to have loved "horseracing, gambling, and celebrations of all sorts" at the nearby camp in Hamilton This boom resulted in three cities coming into existence: Hamilton at the foot of the hills, Treasure City on the hills, and Shermantown, which developed purely as a miners town.

=== Hamilton ===
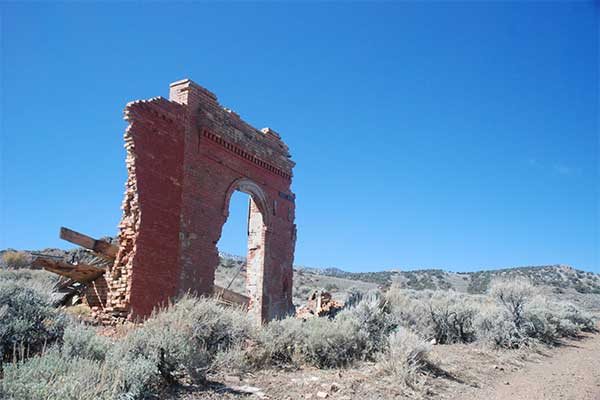
Hamilton ruins

A nearby establishment to operate the mines was set up at Cave City at the foot of the hill in 1868; its name was changed later to Hamilton. The discovery of silver created what was termed as "White Pine Fever." Hotel and saloons were soon established. In 1869, the floating population reported was 10,000. Once water supply was established to the towns, several mills sprung up around them. Smelting works were built at a cost of $60,000, the furnaces were housed in a big building and a 20-ton capacity and 45 ft long smoke stack was created. A 10 stamp Nevada started functioning from 20 May 1869 and a 20 stamp Big Smoky called the Treasure Hill was established on 24 May 1869. Further expansion of the mills occurred on 1 June 1869 with setting up of the 24 Stamp Manhattan.

=== Shermantown and Swansea ===
By 1869, Shermantown (originally named "Silver Springs"), with a population of about 3,000, had become dependent on the mines at Treasure Hill.

Swansea, founded in 1869, is 3 1/4 miles (5.2 km) west of Hamilton. It was named for Swansea, Wales, known for its copper smelting.

The Swansea Mill milled ores from Treasure City and Hamilton. At the peak of the Treasure Hill boom, the residents of Swansea thought that larger mills would soon need to be built and that the main street of Swansea would need to be extended to Shermantown (less than 1 mile (1.6 km) away. By the spring of 1869, Swansea's population had risen to 150 and they had gotten two new smelters to accommodate for the growing influx of people. The area reached its peak in the fall, with a population of 500. However, whilst it was trying to stay afloat, the mining boom had died down, leading to some businesses moving over to Shermantown. Shermantown annexed Swansea in late 1869. Due to the annexation, the early 1870s saw the slow and steady decline of Swansea, leading to mills and smelters closing down for good one by one. By the halfway point of the 1870s, the camp was abandoned. Some rock ruins still remain.

=== Boom and decline ===
The "White Pine rush" resulted in the establishment of White Pine County, which was separated from Lander County on 1 April 1869. Hamilton was its largest town and was originally its county seat. However, this rush faded in the 1870s when new discoveries were made at Cherry Creek and Ward.

With the Silver Rush in the county, Catholic missions grew up in the area in the late 1860s. Peter and Paul Parish under Fr. Dominic Monteverde set up stations at Treasure Hill and Piedmont, and a set up a mission at Cherry Creek.

In 1873, a devastating fire swept through Hamilton, which impacted other towns in the area as well, accelerating emigration to other mining regions. Nonetheless, prospectors later found significant deposits of silver ore in the lower depths of the hill and the industry continued in the late 1870s and early 1880s. An 1885 fire which gutted the courthouse and much of the rest of Hamilton, however, marked the end of the prosperity and "removed most of the evidence that a rich camp had ever existed there".

Over a 20 year period until 1887, the Treasure Hill mines produced $22,000,000 worth of silver.

=== Revival ===
There was short-lived revival of mining activity in the 1920s. A claim covering an area of 125 acres (51 ha) was staked by Treasure Hills Deposit Mining Company. They had sunk a 250 feet (76 m) deep shaft and their production was to the extent of $1.2 million in two years but they soon folded up in 1928. Mining activity had been revived again with a new processing technique using cyanide leaching operations.

The hill now lies within the Humboldt National Forest area, established in 1908.

== Geology ==
High-grade silver ore, "with silica, calcite, silver oxide and manganese oxide in brecciated limestone" were found here. The mines of Treasure Hill are said to exhibit "exceptional occurrences"; the Eberhardt Mine in particular is said to contain "one of the most remarkable occurrences on record as a 6-ton mass, with small grayish to yellowish-green crystals."

When detailed geological investigations were carried out by geologists from the US and Britain, their finding was a dampner to the development of the mines in the hill. They inferred that the ores found were mere deposits only and not sourced by ore-bearing veins in the rocks which could produce mineral ore for a long period. This revelation coupled with miners strikes and bad weather conditions resulted in a mass exodus of people in 1870 from the mining belt.

== Sources ==
- Glass, Mary Ellen (1 January 1983). Touring Nevada: A Historic and Scenic Guide. University of Nevada Press. ISBN 978-0-87417-074-0.
- Hall, Shawn (1994). Romancing Nevada's Past: Ghost Towns and Historic Sites of Eureka, Lander, and White Pine Counties. University of Nevada Press. ISBN 978-0-87417-228-7.
