= Kent Dawson =

American judge (born 1944)

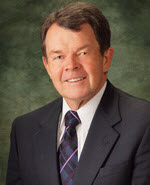

Senior Judge of the United States District Court for the District of Nevada
- Incumbent
- Assumed office July 9, 2012

Judge of the United States District Court for the District of Nevada
- In office May 31, 2000 – July 9, 2012
- Appointed by: Bill Clinton
- Preceded by: Seat established by 113 Stat. 1501
- Succeeded by: Andrew P. Gordon

Personal details
- Born: June 13, 1944 (age 82) Ogden, Utah, U.S.
- Education: Weber State College (BS); University of Utah (JD)

Kent Joseph Dawson (born June 13, 1944) is a senior United States district judge of the United States District Court for the District of Nevada.

== Early life and education ==
Dawson was born in 1944 in Ogden, Utah, and attended Weber State College in Ogden on athletic and music scholarships, graduating in 1969 with a Bachelor of Science degree. He received his Juris Doctor from the University of Utah Law School in 1971, and served as a law clerk for James Guinan, a Nevada state court judge. Dawson served as the assistant city attorney for Henderson, Nevada from 1972 to 1973 and then as city attorney from 1973 to 1979. He served as general counsel of the Public Improvement Trust in Henderson from 1973 to 1995. He served as city manager of Henderson in 1977. He was in private practice in Las Vegas from 1979 to 1995. He served as a judge pro tem of the Henderson Municipal Court from 1993 to 1995. He served as a justice of the peace of the Henderson Justice Court from 1995 to 2000.

=== Federal judicial service ===
On April 6, 2000, Dawson was nominated by President Bill Clinton to serve as a United States district judge of the United States District Court for the District of Nevada. He was confirmed by the United States Senate on May 24, 2000, and receiving his commission on May 31, 2000. Dawson's appointment, along with that of Roger L. Hunt, filled two seats created by 113 Stat. 1501, and represented the first expansion of the federal judiciary in Nevada since 1984. He assumed senior status on July 9, 2012.

=== Notable rulings ===
A famous case heard by Judge Dawson was the criminal prosecution of professional tax protester, Irwin Schiff. In 2005, Schiff was convicted of various criminal tax charges for which Dawson sentenced Schiff, in February 2006, to over thirteen years in prison. Judge Dawson rejected one of Schiff's common tax protester arguments that no law imposes a liability on an individual for income taxes, instructing the jury that sections 1, 61, 62 and 6012 of the Internal Revenue Code "working together, make an individual liable for income taxes". Dawson sentenced Schiff to thirteen years in prison, and Dawson's sentence imposed was unanimously upheld on appeal by the three judge panel of the United States Court of Appeals for the Ninth Circuit, with the exception of a contempt conviction, which was remanded for resentencing.

In late 2011, Judge Dawson granted court orders for the seizure and transfer of hundreds of domain names belonging to websites alleged by luxury goods company Chanel to be selling counterfeit merchandise. He also required that "all social media websites" and "all Internet search engines" (specifically listing Google, Bing, Facebook, Twitter, Google+, Yahoo) remove these domain names from any search results.

Legal offices
Preceded by Seat established by 113 Stat. 1501	Judge of the United States District Court for the District of Nevada; 2000–2012	Succeeded by Andrew P. Gordon
