= United States District Court for the District of Nevada =

United States federal district court of Nevada

Coordinates: 36.16510°N 115.14270°W

- (D. Nev.)
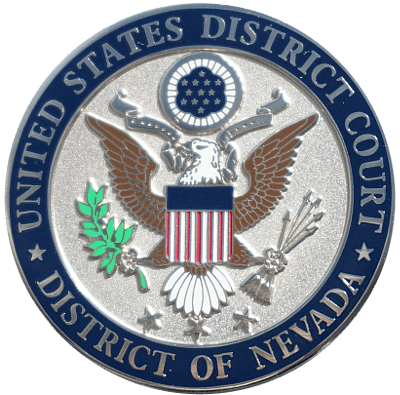

- Location: Las Vegas More locations: Reno; Carson City; Elko; Ely; Lovelock
- Appeals to: Ninth Circuit
- Established: February 27, 1865
- Judges: 7
- Chief Judge: Andrew P. Gordon

Officers of the court
- U.S. Attorney: Sigal Chattah (acting)
- U.S. Marshal: Gary G. Schofield
- www.nvd.uscourts.gov

The United States District Court for the District of Nevada (in case citations, D. Nev.) is the federal district court whose jurisdiction is the state of Nevada. The court has locations in Las Vegas and Reno.

Cases from the District of Nevada are appealed to the United States Court of Appeals for the Ninth Circuit (except for patent claims and claims against the U.S. government under the Tucker Act, which are appealed to the Federal Circuit).

The United States Attorney's Office for the District of Nevada represents the United States in civil and criminal litigation in the court. As of April 1, 2025, the acting United States attorney is Sigal Chattah.

== Current judges ==
As of December 20, 2025:

| # | Title | Judge | Duty station | Born | Term of service | | | Appointed by |
| # | Title | Judge | Duty station | Born | Active | Chief | Senior | Appointed by |
|---|---|---|---|---|---|---|---|---|
| 26 | Chief Judge | Andrew P. Gordon | Las Vegas | 1962 | 2013–present | 2024–present | — | Obama |
| 24 | District Judge | Gloria Navarro | Las Vegas | 1967 | 2010–present | 2014–2019 | — | Obama |
| 25 | District Judge | Miranda Du | Reno | 1969 | 2012–present | 2019–2024 | — | Obama |
| 27 | District Judge | Jennifer A. Dorsey | Las Vegas | 1971 | 2013–present | — | — | Obama |
| 28 | District Judge | Richard F. Boulware | Las Vegas | 1968 | 2014–present | — | — | Obama |
| 29 | District Judge | Anne Traum | Reno | 1969 | 2022–present | — | — | Biden |
| 30 | District Judge | Cristina D. Silva | Las Vegas | 1979 | 2022–present | — | — | Biden |
| 14 | Senior Judge | Howard D. McKibben | Reno | 1940 | 1984–2005 | 1997–2002 | 2005–present | Reagan |
| 18 | Senior Judge | Roger L. Hunt | inactive | 1942 | 2000–2011 | 2007–2011 | 2011–present | Clinton |
| 19 | Senior Judge | Kent Dawson | Las Vegas | 1944 | 2000–2012 | — | 2012–present | Clinton |
| 21 | Senior Judge | James C. Mahan | Las Vegas | 1943 | 2002–2018 | — | 2018–present | G.W. Bush |
| 22 | Senior Judge | Robert Clive Jones | inactive | 1947 | 2003–2016 | 2011–2014 | 2016–present | G.W. Bush |

== Former judges ==
| # | Judge | Born–died | Active service | Chief Judge | Senior status | Appointed by | Reason for termination |
|---|---|---|---|---|---|---|---|
| 1 | Alexander White Baldwin | 1835–1869 | 1865–1869 | — | — | Lincoln | death |
| 2 | Edgar Winters Hillyer | 1830–1882 | 1869–1882 | — | — | Grant | death |
| 3 | George Myron Sabin | 1833–1890 | 1882–1890 | — | — | Arthur | death |
| 4 | Thomas Porter Hawley | 1830–1907 | 1890–1906 | — | — | B. Harrison | retirement |
| 5 | Edward Silsby Farrington | 1856–1929 | 1907–1928 | — | 1928–1929 | T. Roosevelt | death |
| 6 | Frank Herbert Norcross | 1869–1952 | 1928–1945 | — | 1945–1952 | Coolidge | death |
| 7 | Roger Thomas Foley | 1886–1974 | 1945–1957 | 1954–1957 | 1957–1974 | Truman (Note: Judge Foley was nominated by President Roosevelt but was appointed to the Court by (i.e., received his commission from) President Truman.) | death |
| 8 | John Rolly Ross | 1899–1963 | 1954–1963 | 1961–1963 | — | Eisenhower | death |
| 9 | Roger D. Foley | 1917–1996 | 1962–1982 | 1963–1980 | 1982–1996 | Kennedy | death |
| 10 | Bruce Rutherford Thompson | 1911–1992 | 1963–1978 | — | 1978–1992 | Kennedy | death |
| 11 | Harry E. Claiborne | 1917–2004 | 1978–1986 | 1980–1986 | — | Carter | removal |
| 12 | Edward Cornelius Reed Jr. | 1924–2013 | 1979–1992 | 1986–1992 | 1992–2013 | Carter | death |
| 13 | Lloyd D. George | 1930–2020 | 1984–1997 | 1992–1997 | 1997–2020 | Reagan | death |
| 15 | Philip Martin Pro | 1946–present | 1987–2011 | 2002–2007 | 2011–2015 | Reagan | retirement |
| 16 | David Warner Hagen | 1931–2022 | 1993–2003 | — | 2003–2005 | Clinton | retirement |
| 17 | Johnnie B. Rawlinson | 1952–present | 1998–2000 | — | — | Clinton | elevation |
| 20 | Larry R. Hicks | 1943–2024 | 2001–2012 | — | 2012–2024 | G.W. Bush | death |
| 23 | Brian Sandoval | 1963–present | 2005–2009 | — | — | G.W. Bush | resignation |

== Chief judges ==
Chief judges have administrative responsibilities with respect to their district court. Unlike the Supreme Court, where one justice is specifically nominated to be chief, the office of chief judge rotates among the district court judges. To be chief, a judge must have been in active service on the court for at least one year, be under the age of 65, and have not previously served as chief judge.

A vacancy is filled by the judge highest in seniority among the group of qualified judges. The chief judge serves for a term of seven years, or until age 70, whichever occurs first. The age restrictions are waived if no members of the court would otherwise be qualified for the position.

When the office was created in 1948, the chief judge was the longest-serving judge who had not elected to retire, on what has since 1958 been known as senior status, or declined to serve as chief judge. After August 6, 1959, judges could not become or remain chief after turning 70 years old. The current rules have been in operation since October 1, 1982.

== Succession of seats ==
Seat 1
Seat established on February 27, 1865 by 13 Stat. 440
| Baldwin | 1865–1869 |
| Hillyer | 1869–1882 |
| Sabin | 1882–1890 |
| Hawley | 1890–1906 |
| Farrington | 1907–1928 |
| Norcross | 1928–1945 |
| R.T. Foley | 1945–1957 |
Seat abolished on April 1, 1957 (temporary judgeship expired)

Seat 2
Seat established on February 10, 1954 by 68 Stat. 8 (temporary)
Seat became permanent upon the abolition of Seat 1 on April 1, 1957
| Ross | 1954–1963 |
| Thompson | 1963–1978 |
| Claiborne | 1978–1986 |
| Pro | 1987–2011 |
| Boulware II | 2014–present |

Seat 3
Seat established on May 19, 1961 by 75 Stat. 80
| R.D. Foley | 1962–1982 |
| George | 1984–1997 |
| Rawlinson | 1998–2000 |
| Hicks | 2001–2012 |
| Dorsey | 2013–present |

Seat 4
Seat established on October 20, 1978 by 92 Stat. 1629
| Reed, Jr. | 1979–1992 |
| Hagen | 1993–2003 |
| Jones | 2003–2016 |
| Traum | 2022–present |

Seat 5
Seat established on July 10, 1984 by 98 Stat. 333
| McKibben | 1984–2005 |
| Sandoval | 2005–2009 |
| Navarro | 2010–present |

Seat 6
Seat established on November 29, 1999 by 113 Stat. 1501
| Hunt | 2000–2011 |
| Du | 2012–present |

Seat 7
Seat established on November 29, 1999 by 113 Stat. 1501
| Dawson | 2000–2012 |
| Gordon | 2013–present |

Seat 8
Seat established on December 21, 2000 by 114 Stat. 2762
| Mahan | 2002–2018 |
| Silva | 2022–present |

== Courthouses ==
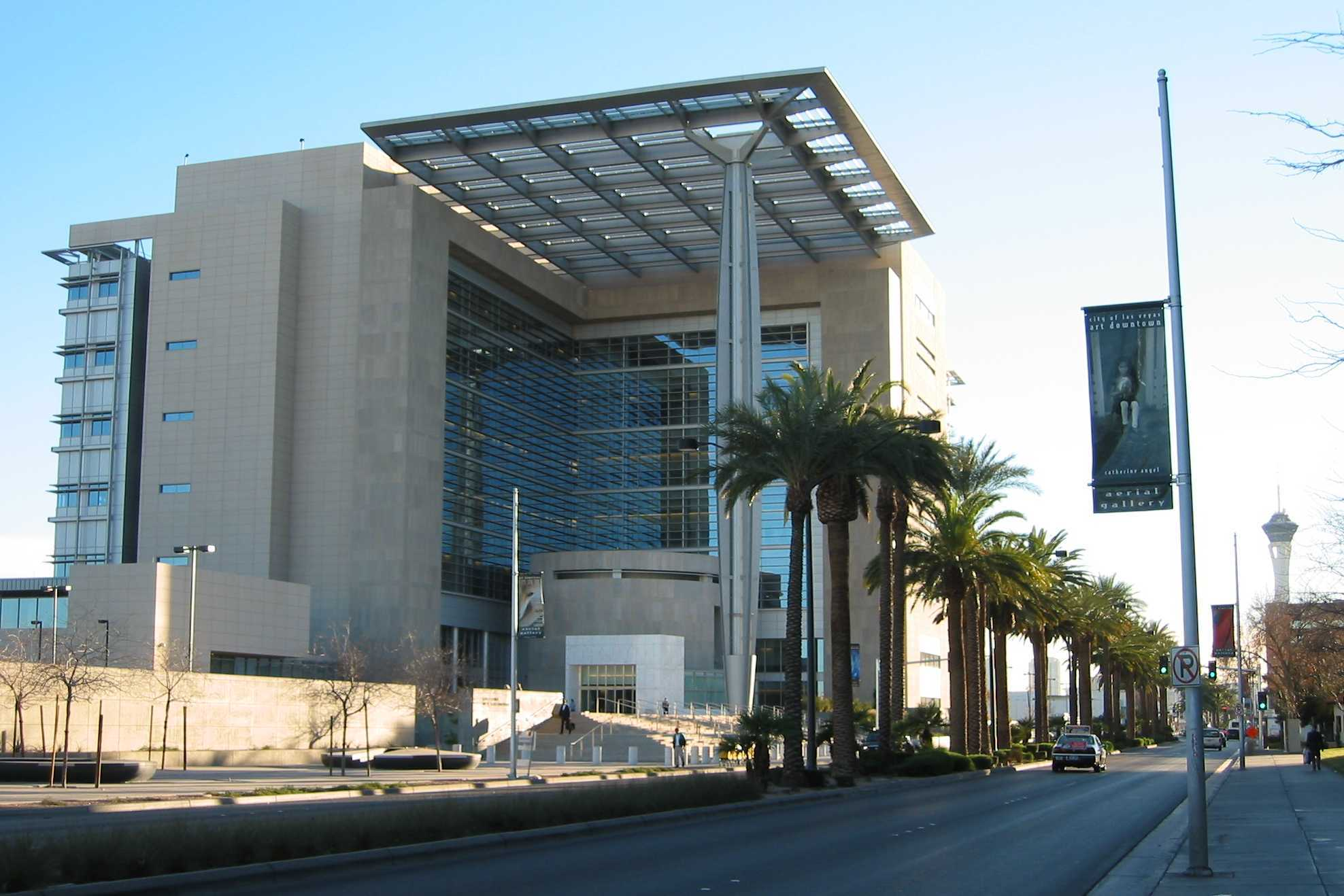
The Lloyd D. George Federal District Courthouse in Las Vegas.

=== Las Vegas ===
The Lloyd D. George Federal District Courthouse is the home for the district court in Las Vegas. The building of the courthouse was completed in 2002 and was the first federal building built to comply with the post-Oklahoma City blast resistance requirements. Blast-resistance tests for the project were conducted at the Department of Defense’s Large Blast Thermal Simulator (LBTS) in White Sands, New Mexico to validate building performance under blast loads. The LBTS facility was designed, built, and equipped in the early 1990s to perform tests on structural models, vehicles, and components, subjected to simulated high pressures combined with high temperatures, as in a major blast.

On January 4, 2010, a single gunman, identified as Johnny Lee Wicks, aged 66, went inside the lobby of the courthouse and opened fire, fatally wounding Special Deputy U.S. Marshal Stanley Cooper who was on duty as a Court Security Officer. Wicks was killed by return fire from other security officers and U.S. Marshals. The Entry Rotunda is named in the Honor of Deputy Cooper and the City of Las Vegas named a street near the court in his honor as well.

Senators Harry Reid and John Ensign, both of whom had offices in the courthouse building, were not present when this happened. Wicks was apparently angry over the outcome of a legal dispute over his Social Security benefits.

=== Reno ===
The Bruce R. Thompson Courthouse and Federal Building was completed in 1996. The building's primary tenants are the U.S. District Court, U.S. Marshals Service, U.S. Probation and Pretrial Services, Nevada Senators, and the Corporation for National Community Services.

== See also ==
- Courts of Nevada
- List of current United States district judges
- List of United States federal courthouses in Nevada
