= Larry R. Hicks =

American judge (1943–2024)

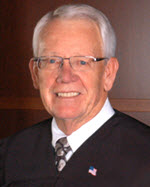

Senior Judge of the United States District Court for the District of Nevada
- In office December 13, 2012 – May 29, 2024

Judge of the United States District Court for the District of Nevada
- In office November 7, 2001 – December 13, 2012
- Appointed by: George W. Bush
- Preceded by: Johnnie B. Rawlinson
- Succeeded by: Jennifer A. Dorsey

Personal details
- Born: December 13, 1943 Evanston, Illinois, U.S.
- Died: May 29, 2024 (aged 80) Reno, Nevada, U.S.
- Education: University of Nevada, Reno (BS); University of Colorado (JD)

Larry Richard Hicks (December 13, 1943 – May 29, 2024) was an American jurist who served as a United States district judge of the United States District Court for the District of Nevada from 2001 until his death in 2024. Hicks was nominated to the position by President George W. Bush. He assumed senior status in 2012.

== Early life and education ==
Hicks was born in Evanston, Illinois, on December 13, 1943. He received a Bachelor of Science degree from the University of Nevada, Reno, in 1965, and a Juris Doctor from the University of Colorado School of Law in 1968.

== Career ==
Hicks was a law clerk, Washoe County District Attorney's Office, Nevada in 1968, and was then an attorney in that office from 1968 to 1974, and District Attorney of Washoe County from 1975 to 1979. He entered private practice in Nevada in 1979, remaining in practice until 2001.

=== Federal judicial service ===
On September 4, 2001, Hicks was nominated by President George W. Bush to the United States District Court for the District of Nevada vacated by Judge Johnnie B. Rawlinson. Hicks was confirmed by the United States Senate on November 5, 2001, and received his commission on November 7, 2001. He assumed senior status on December 13, 2012.

=== Notable cases ===
In 2006, Hicks sentenced three former Clark County commissioners to federal prison in a federal political corruption case known as "Operation G-Sting," which originated from bribes by a strip club owner to elected officials.

In 2011, he was asked by Shoshone tribes of Northern Nevada to maintain a 2009 restriction that protected the region's environment against Toronto-based Barrick Gold Corp's wish to expand its gold-extraction operations on their land considered sacred.

In October 2013, he sent Nevada power broker Harvey Whittemore to a two-year prison sentence for making illegal contributions to Harry Reid's campaign in 2007. In February 2015, he granted a preliminary injunction against the Bureau of Land Management's removal of 200 wild horses in Northern Nevada, and the roundup of 166 others with porcine zona pellucida. In March 2017, he sentenced a man from India to 15 years in prison for plotting terrorist attacks in his homeland from the US.

In August 2018, he granted a new injunction in favor of Oracle in the case Rimini Street Inc. v. Oracle USA Inc., which led Rimini Street to forward $28.5 million in attorney's fees. In November 2018, he refused the right to strike to garbage collectors employed by Waste Management of Nevada. They were asking for longer, less-supervised lunch breaks.

== Death ==
Hicks died after being struck by a car outside the federal courthouse in downtown Reno, Nevada, on May 29, 2024, at the age of 80.

Legal offices
Preceded by Johnnie B. Rawlinson	Judge of the United States District Court for the District of Nevada; 2001–2012	Succeeded by Jennifer A. Dorsey
