= Roger D. Foley =

American judge

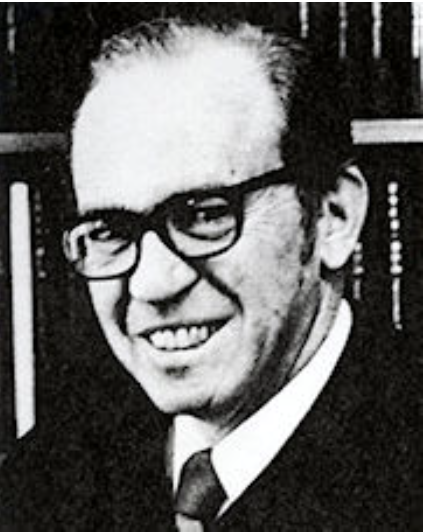

Senior Judge of the United States District Court for the District of Nevada
- In office October 29, 1982 – January 7, 1996

Chief Judge of the United States District Court for the District of Nevada
- In office 1963–1980
- Preceded by: John Rolly Ross
- Succeeded by: Harry E. Claiborne

Judge of the United States District Court for the District of Nevada
- In office July 2, 1962 – October 29, 1982
- Appointed by: John F. Kennedy
- Preceded by: Seat established by 75 Stat. 80
- Succeeded by: Lloyd D. George

Attorney General of Nevada
- In office 1959–1962
- Governor: Grant Sawyer
- Preceded by: Harvey Dickerson
- Succeeded by: Charles E. Springer

Personal details
- Born: Roger Drummond Foley; April 28, 1917 Goldfield, Nevada
- Died: January 7, 1996 (aged 78) Las Vegas, Nevada
- Education: University of San Francisco School of Law (LL.B.)

Roger Drummond Foley (April 28, 1917 – January 7, 1996) was a United States district judge of the United States District Court for the District of Nevada.

== Education and career ==
Born in Goldfield, Nevada, Foley was the eldest of five sons of Helen Drummond and Roger Thomas Foley, the latter also having been a federal district judge in Nevada. The family moved to Las Vegas in 1928. He received a Bachelor of Laws from the University of San Francisco School of Law. During World War II, Foley flew over 50 combat missions as a first lieutenant bombardier and navigator in the United States Army Air Forces. He was a deputy district attorney of Clark County, Nevada from 1948 to 1951, then district attorney of that county until 1955. He was in private practice in Las Vegas from 1956 to 1958, and was the Attorney General of Nevada from 1959 to 1962.

== Federal judicial service ==
On June 12, 1962, Foley was nominated by President John F. Kennedy to a new seat on the United States District Court for the District of Nevada created by 75 Stat. 80. He was confirmed by the United States Senate on June 29, 1962, and received his commission on July 2, 1962. He served as Chief Judge from 1963 to 1980, assuming senior status on October 29, 1982, and serving in that capacity until his death on January 7, 1996, in Las Vegas.

== Honor ==
The Foley Federal Building and United States Courthouse in Las Vegas is named for the family, as a whole.

== Sources ==
Legal offices
Preceded by Harvey Dickerson	Attorney General of Nevada; 1959–1962	Succeeded by Charles E. Springer
Preceded by Seat established by 75 Stat. 80	Judge of the United States District Court for the District of Nevada; 1962–1982	Succeeded by Lloyd D. George
Preceded by John Rolly Ross	Chief Judge of the United States District Court for the District of Nevada; 1963–1980	Succeeded by Harry E. Claiborne
