= Roger Thomas Foley =

American judge

Senior Judge of the United States District Court for the District of Nevada
- In office April 1, 1957 – October 9, 1974

Chief Judge of the United States District Court for the District of Nevada
- In office 1954–1957
- Preceded by: Office established
- Succeeded by: John Rolly Ross

Judge of the United States District Court for the District of Nevada
- In office May 2, 1945 – April 1, 1957
- Nominated by: Franklin D. Roosevelt
- Appointed by: Harry S. Truman
- Preceded by: Frank Herbert Norcross
- Succeeded by: Seat abolished

Personal details
- Born: Roger Thomas Foley; May 25, 1886 Sioux City, Iowa
- Died: October 9, 1974 (aged 88)
- Children: Roger D. Foley
- Education: University of Chicago Law School

Roger Thomas Foley (May 25, 1886 – October 9, 1974) was a United States district judge of the United States District Court for the District of Nevada.

== Education and career ==
Born in Sioux City, Iowa, Foley graduated from the University of Chicago Law School in 1910 and was in private practice in Goldfield, Nevada from 1911 to 1925, and in Los Angeles, California from 1925 to 1928. He was a district attorney for Goldfield from 1916 to 1924. He was a justice of the peace and municipal judge in Las Vegas, Nevada from 1929 to 1931. He was a deputy district attorney of Las Vegas from 1932 to 1934, then district attorney of Las Vegas from 1935 to 1938. He was a Nevada district judge for Clark County and Lincoln County from 1939 to 1941, returning to private practice in Las Vegas from 1941 to 1945.

== Federal judicial service ==
Foley was nominated by President Franklin D. Roosevelt on March 30, 1945, to a seat on the United States District Court for the District of Nevada vacated by Judge Frank Herbert Norcross. He was confirmed by the United States Senate on April 10, 1945, and received his commission from President Harry S. Truman on May 2, 1945. He served as Chief Judge from 1954 to 1957. He assumed senior status on April 1, 1957. His service terminated on October 9, 1974, due to his death.

== Family and honor ==
Foley's son, Roger D. Foley, also served as a federal judge on the same court. The Foley Federal Building and United States Courthouse in Las Vegas is named for the family, as a whole.

== Sources ==
Legal offices
Preceded by Frank Herbert Norcross	Judge of the United States District Court for the District of Nevada; 1945–1957	Succeeded by Seat abolished
Preceded by Office established	Chief Judge of the United States District Court for the District of Nevada; 1954–1957	Succeeded by John Rolly Ross
