= Hamilton, Nevada =

Hamilton
- Ghost town
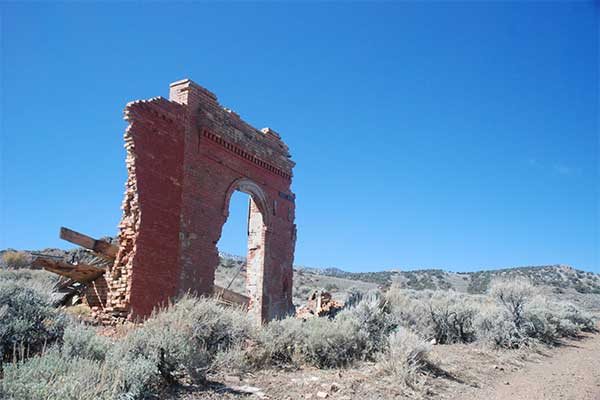
- Ruined facade of the old Wells Fargo building, Hamilton, Nevada, September 2007

- Location within the state of Nevada Hamilton (the United States)
- Coordinates: 39°15′11″N 115°29′6″W
- Country: United States
- State: Nevada
- County: White Pine
- Established: May 1868
- Elevation: 8,058 ft (2,456 m)

Population (2010)
  - Total: 0
- Time zone: UTC-8 (Pacific (PST))
  - Summer (DST): UTC-7 (PDT)
- GNIS feature ID: 859930

Nevada Historical Marker
- Reference no.: 53

Hamilton is an abandoned mining town located in the White Pine Range, in western White Pine County, Nevada, United States.

== History ==
Hamilton appeared after the discovery of rich silver ore at Treasure Hill. The first settlers found shelter in local caves, which were numerous. By May 1868, the settlement, then known as "Cave City" was formed.

=== Boom years ===
The town boomed following the discovery of rich silver deposits nearby. With a population of six hundred, it was renamed for mine promoter W. H. Hamilton. The post office first opened for business on August 10, 1868 while the community was still part of Lander County, Nevada.

White Pine County was formed in March 1869, and Hamilton was selected as the first county seat. By its peak during the summer of 1869, Hamilton's population was estimated at 12,000. There were close to 100 saloons, several breweries, 60 general stores, and numerous other businesses. There were also theaters, dance halls, skating rinks, a Miners’ Union Hall, and a fraternal order located in the thriving community. Close to 200 mining companies were operating in the area.

=== Decline ===
However, Hamilton's prosperity was not to last. It was soon discovered that the local ore deposits proved shallow. Subsequently, by 1870, less than two years after its founding, the community was already in decline. Once the shallow nature of the local ore deposits became known, many of the mining companies left the area. Hamilton's population and economy began a rapid decline. At the census of 1870, the population was 3,915, less than a third of what it had been estimated at the previous summer. On June 27, 1873, a large fire spread throughout the business district and caused an estimated US$600,000 (equivalent to $16,130,000 in 2025) in damage. Most businesses that burnt down were abandoned and not rebuilt. By this time, the town's population was estimated to have shrunk to only 500. Another fire destroyed the courthouse at Hamilton along with all of the records in January 1885. County records began to be kept at the Ely courthouse on January 5, 1885. Although Hamilton was the first county seat of White Pine County, the rapidly shrinking community lost that designation to the town of Ely in 1887.

The Lincoln Highway went to Hamilton as late as 1913, but by 1924, the town was bypassed.

The Hamilton post office closed in 1931. The population was 25 in 1940.

Hamilton is now a ghost town, with only scattered ruins remaining at the site.

== In popular culture ==
The 1967 episode "Solid Foundation" of the syndicated television anthology series, Death Valley Days, hosted by Robert Taylor, is set in Hamilton. In the storyline, prospector Jim Otis (Gil Peterson) fails to find gold but stumbles on, first, outlaws' loot and then silver, some of which was used to construct his house. Susan Seaforth Hayes was cast as Jim's wife, Martha, who wanted her husband to head back East after three months in the West.

== See also ==
- Treasure Hill (White Pine County, Nevada) - Description of nearby towns and the geology of the area.
