= First ladies of Nevada =

Spouse of the governor of Nevada

First Lady of Nevada
- Seal of Nevada
- Current; Donna Lombardo since January 2, 2023
- Style: Mrs. Lombardo; Madam First Lady
- Residence: Governor's Mansion
- Inaugural holder: Sarah Jane Blasdel
- Formation: December 5, 1864 (161 years ago)
- Website: Official website

First lady of Nevada is the honorary title traditionally given to the wife or spouse of the governor of Nevada. As Nevada has not yet elected a female governor, all gubernatorial spouses to date have been first ladies. On occasions when the governor was unmarried or widowed, the role of official host at the Nevada Governor's Mansion was instead carried out by a daughter or mother of the governor.

The current first lady of Nevada is Donna Lombardo, wife of Governor Joe Lombardo, who assumed the role on January 2, 2023.

== List of first ladies ==
=== Territorial first ladies ===
Name	Took office	Left office	Governor
Vacant (widower)	1859	1861	Isaac Roop (Territorial Governor)
Elsie Ann Nye	1861	1864	James W. Nye (Territorial Governor)

=== First ladies since statehood ===
Name	Took office	Left office	Governor
Sarah Jane Blasdel	December 5, 1864	1871	Henry G. Blasdel
Virginia Hode Belknap (daughter)	1871	1879	Lewis R. Bradley
Elizabeth Kinkead	1879	1883	John H. Kinkead
Emma Adams	1883	1887	Jewett W. Adams
Ellen M. Frame Stevenson	1887	1890	Charles C. Stevenson
Mary E. Hopkins	1890	1891	Frank Bell
Mary Frances Colcord	1891	1895	Roswell K. Colcord
Elizabeth Jones-Sifford	1895	1896	John E. Jones
Louise Sadler	1896	1903	Reinhold Sadler
Nancy Elnora Sparks	1903	1908	John Sparks
Una Dickerson	1908	1911	Denver S. Dickerson
Ellen G. Oddie (mother)	1911	1915	Tasker L. Oddie
Vida Margaret Boyle	1915	1923	Emmet D. Boyle
Julia Scrugham	1923	1927	James G. Scrugham
Edna Idelle Balzar	1927	1934	Fred B. Balzar
Marianne Griswold	1934	1935	Morley Griswold
Mabelle Jean Kirman	1935	1939	Richard Kirman, Sr.
Irma Marie Carville	1939	1945	Edward P. Carville
Ida Louise Pittman	1945	1951	Vail M. Pittman
Marjorie Ann Russell	1951	1959	Charles H. Russell
Bette Norene Sawyer	1959	1967	Grant Sawyer
Jackalyn Laxalt	1967	1971	Paul Laxalt
Carolyn J. O'Callaghan	1971	1979	Mike O'Callaghan
Kathryn Sue List	1979	1983	Robert List
Bonnie Bryan	1983	1989	Richard Bryan
Sandra Ann Miller	1989	1999	Bob Miller
Dema Lee Guinn	1999	2007	Kenny Guinn
Dawn Gibbons	2007	2010	Jim Gibbons
Vacant	2010	2011	Jim Gibbons
Kathleen Teipner	2011	2018	Brian Sandoval
Vacant	2018		Brian Sandoval
Lauralyn Sandoval	2018	2019	Brian Sandoval
Kathy Sisolak	2019	2023	Steve Sisolak
Donna Lombardo	2023	Current	Joe Lombardo
