= Jim Gibbons (American politician) =

American attorney and politician (born 1944)

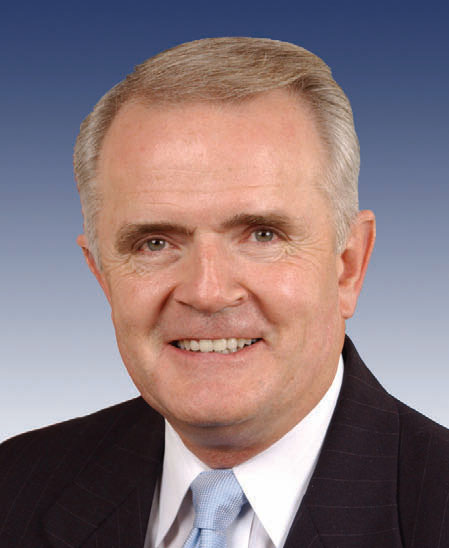

28th Governor of Nevada
- In office January 1, 2007 – January 3, 2011
- Lieutenant: Brian Krolicki
- Preceded by: Kenny Guinn
- Succeeded by: Brian Sandoval

Member of the U.S. House of Representatives from Nevada's 2nd district
- In office January 3, 1997 – December 31, 2006
- Preceded by: Barbara Vucanovich
- Succeeded by: Dean Heller

Member of the Nevada State Assembly
- In office November 4, 1992 – November 3, 1994
- Preceded by: Bob Kerns
- Succeeded by: Brian Sandoval
- Constituency: 25th district
- In office April 16, 1991 – November 3, 1992
- Preceded by: Dawn Gibbons
- Succeeded by: Richard Perkins
- Constituency: 23rd district
- In office November 9, 1988 – January 17, 1991
- Preceded by: David Nicholas
- Succeeded by: Dawn Gibbons
- Constituency: 23rd district

Personal details
- Born: James Arthur Gibbons; December 16, 1944 (age 81) Sparks, Nevada, U.S.
- Party: Republican
- Spouse: Dawn Snelling (m. 1985; div. 2010)
- Children: 1
- Education: University of Nevada, Reno (BS, MS); Southwestern University, California (JD)

Military service
- Branch/service: United States Air Force
- Years of service: 1967–1971; 1975–1996
- Rank: Colonel
- Unit: Air National Guard • Nevada Air National Guard
- Battles/wars: Vietnam War; Gulf War
- Awards: Legion of Merit; Distinguished Flying Cross

James Arthur Gibbons (born December 16, 1944) is an American attorney, aviator, geologist, hydrologist and politician who was the 28th governor of Nevada from 2007 to 2011. A member of the Republican Party, he previously served as the U.S. representative for Nevada's 2nd congressional district from 1997 to 2006.

Following his service in the United States Air Force, Gibbons served as vice commander of the Nevada National Guard from 1990 to 1996. He unsuccessfully ran for governor of Nevada in 1994, losing to incumbent Bob Miller. Two years later he successfully ran for the House of Representatives, where he represented Nevada's 2nd congressional district from 1997 to 2006. Gibbons again ran for governor in 2006, defeating Democratic nominee Dina Titus in the election.

Gibbons' term as governor was dominated by the Great Recession, which hit Nevada particularly hard. In response he cut funding for state services by 5%, but this ended up causing a budget crisis. Nevada experienced an economic slowdown, steep budget cuts, and high taxes during Gibbons's governorship. Afterwards he ranked among the worst governors in the United States. Gibbons attempted to run for reelection in 2010, losing the Republican nomination to federal judge Brian Sandoval, who later won the election.

== Early life and education ==
Gibbons was born in Sparks, Nevada. He was raised in The Church of Jesus Christ of Latter-Day Saints. Gibbons interrupted his studies at the University of Nevada, Reno, during the Vietnam War to serve in the United States Air Force (1967–1971). During his time in college he was a member of Sigma Nu fraternity. He also attended Southwestern Law School in Los Angeles, California and the University of Southern California for post-graduate studies. A graduate of the U.S. Air Force Air Command and Staff College and the Air War College, he joined the Nevada Air National Guard in 1975 and served as its vice commander from 1990 to 1996, participating in the first Gulf War.

== Career ==
Gibbons represented District 23, later renumbered as District 25 (Washoe County), in the Nevada Assembly from 1988 to 1994 (with a short intermission due to military service in 1991). Gibbons won his first election with approximately 64% of the vote and thereafter faced no opposition due to the heavy Republican lean of the district. During this time he and his Nevada Air National Guard unit was called to active service in the U.S. Air Force for the Gulf War. During this period, he served as a pilot and Flight Leader flying the RF-4C Phantom II reconnaissance aircraft. During the conflict, he was awarded the Distinguished Flying Cross for extraordinary achievement while participating in a mission in which he flew his unarmed aircraft on a reconnaissance mission to acquire politically sensitive imagery of enemy targets in Kuwait.

=== 1994 gubernatorial election ===
While working as a pilot for Delta Air Lines and serving in the Nevada Assembly, Gibbons ran for Nevada governor in 1994. As the Republican nominee, he lost to Democratic incumbent Bob Miller, having received 156,875 votes to Miller's 200,026.

=== United States Congress ===
In 1996, Barbara Vucanovich, the only representative that the 2nd District had known since Nevada was split into districts in 1983, announced her retirement. Gibbons won the Republican primary—the real contest in this heavily Republican district—and breezed to victory in November. He was reelected four times with no substantive opposition, including a 1998 run in which he faced no major-party opposition.

Gibbons served as vice chairman of the House Resources Committee, and he was a member of the Armed Services Committee, the Homeland Security Committee and the Permanent Select Committee on Intelligence. His long-time congressional Chief of Staff, Michael Dayton, was replaced in 2002 by legislative director Robert Uithoven. Uithoven served on Gibbons' staff for many years, including four years as chief of staff. He later served as campaign manager for Gibbons' successful 2006 Gubernatorial campaign. Uithoven was not given a gubernatorial position. His predecessor, Michael Dayton, was named as the governor's top aide.

=== 2006 gubernatorial election ===
Gibbons announced in late 2004 that he would not run for a sixth term in the U.S. House of Representatives in 2006, instead opting to run for Governor of Nevada. Gibbons won the August 15, 2006, Republican primary handily, defeating state senator Bob Beers and Lieutenant Governor Lorraine Hunt.

==== Employing illegal immigrant housekeeper/nanny ====
As Gibbons was campaigning for governor in October 2006, it was brought to light that more than ten years earlier, his wife Dawn had employed Martha Patricia Pastor Sandoval, a then-illegal immigrant from Peru, as a housekeeper and babysitter. Since the Nannygate matter of 1993, politicians have been deeply concerned about the impact of such revelations on their careers.

Dawn, who had become a member of the Nevada Assembly in 1998, denied the allegations in 2006, claiming that Sandoval had merely been a friend who had helped out around the house and was given clothing and household goods, but was not an employee. An employment contract between Dawn Gibbons and Sandoval, however, appeared to disprove that assertion, as it clearly laid out the terms and conditions of Sandoval's hiring. Documents filed during Sandoval's 1988 application for working papers also contradicted earlier statements by Dawn Gibbons that the family had not known that the woman was in the United States illegally.

Sandoval stated that she was employed from approximately 1987 to 1993, four years before Gibbons left for Washington in 1997, after his 1996 election as a Congressman and five years before Dawn Gibbons became a state legislator. Sandoval also stated that she was asked to hide in the basement and refrain from answering doors at certain times in order to ensure that her illegal status did not become public knowledge and jeopardize Gibbons' political career.

In 1995, Dawn Gibbons filed a police complaint against Sandoval, alleging that she was attempting to extort money by threatening to go to the media with a story involving her illegal employment. Jim and Dawn Gibbons did not pursue the matter further.

In response to the 2006 revelations, Jim Gibbons' campaign issued a statement accusing Democratic candidate Dina Titus of fomenting the controversy to distract from the real issues of the race, but did not issue a denial of Sandoval's claims.

==== Sexual assault civil suit ====
In October 2006, near the conclusion of his successful campaign for governor, a woman accused Gibbons of attempted sexual assault in a parking garage. Gibbons claimed he was helping her to her car. They both admitted to drinking alcohol at McCormick and Schmick's restaurant in Las Vegas.

In the initial aftermath of the event, Clark County Sheriff Bill Young, a Republican and long time supporter and donor of Gibbons' gubernatorial campaign, cited lack of evidence in the case and refused to bring evidence of the attack to the District Attorney. The accuser did not initially want to pursue pressing charges, saying she just wanted "to be left alone." But the Las Vegas Metropolitan Police Department was forced to open the case after inquiries by the Las Vegas media, the Las Vegas Review-Journal and the Las Vegas Sun which also drew controversy by releasing the woman's name and thrust her into the public eye.

She later said she was being pressured to not talk to the police about the incident by people close to Gibbons. In fact, the Gibbons campaign hired a private investigator to talk to the woman shortly after the incident occurred.

The evidence was given to Clark County District Attorney David Roger, a Republican, who had also donated to the Gibbons campaign. Criminal charges were never filed in the case.

Gibbons' gubernatorial campaign manager, Robert Uithoven, speculated in an e-mail to Gibbons' supporters that Dina Titus, Gibbons' opponent, hired the woman to entice Gibbons. Titus retorted that to do this she would have had to control where Gibbons went, who he was with, and even the weather (Gibbons claimed he was helping the woman to her car in part because of the weather).

By 2009, the alleged victim had filed a civil suit against Jim Gibbons, specifically alleging battery, false imprisonment and second-degree kidnapping as well as deceit about the episode. The lawsuit was settled in July 2013 for $50,000.

==== Federal bribery investigation ====
On November 1, 2006, The Wall Street Journal published a story stating that Gibbons had earmarked several millions of dollars to a company owned by Warren Trepp, the former chief bond trader for Michael Milken at the height of his junk bond trading period at Drexel Burnham Lambert. The Journal also said that Gibbons had directed additional funds to a pre-existing government contract with Trepp's startup company. The report noted that Trepp had paid for a $10,000 cruise for Gibbons and his wife, which Gibbons failed to report in his U.S. House of Representatives ethics filings, and $100,000 in campaign contributions. Dennis L. Montgomery, a former Trepp business partner, claimed that Gibbons was also given gambling chips – convertible into cash – and cash directly.

On February 15, 2007, the Journal reported that Gibbons was under federal investigation for allegedly accepting unreported gifts and/or payments from Trepp in exchange for official acts while he served in Congress (1997–2007).

According to reports, on March 22, 2005, days before Trepp and his wife left for the Caribbean cruise with Gibbons and his family, Jalé Trepp, Warren's wife, sent a reminder to her husband. It said, "Please don't forget to bring the money you promised Jim and Dawn (Gibbons)." Minutes later, Trepp responded, "Don't you ever send this kind of message to me! Erase this message from your computer right now!"

The ethics probe into Gibbons expanded to include another company that paid Gibbons' wife Dawn $35,000 in consulting fees in 2004, while Gibbons helped the company receive a no-bid federal contract.

The U.S. Attorney for Nevada at time of the investigation was Republican Daniel Bogden, who had been appointed by Republican President George W. Bush in 2001. Bogdan was one of seven federal prosecutors dismissed by the Bush in December 2006 without explanation.

==== 2006 gubernatorial election results ====
In the general election he faced Democratic nominee Dina Titus, who was the Minority Leader in the Nevada State Senate. Gibbons received 278,984 votes to Titus's 255,675. Titus won Clark County, Nevada's most populous, but Gibbons won every other county. Gibbons called Titus "an admirable opponent", although Titus declined to echo his sentiments, saying "We disagree on basic policies, and neither one of us is going to change our minds for the other".

Gibbons resigned his House seat on New Year's Eve, and was sworn in as governor just after midnight on New Year's Day.

=== 2010 gubernatorial election ===
Gibbons was the subject of numerous controversies, both professional and personal, causing speculation that he would not seek re-election for a second term as governor. However, Gibbons did file as a candidate for re-election in March 2010. On June 9, 2010, he lost his bid for nomination in the Republican primary to former federal judge Brian Sandoval—who went on to win the general election and become the 29th governor of Nevada.

== Gubernatorial initiatives ==
=== Support for the Yucca Mountain nuclear repository ===
In July 2007, Gibbons approved a plan to let the U.S. Department of Energy use the state's water to explore the planned Yucca Mountain nuclear waste site. According to the Las Vegas Sun, "Neither Gibbons nor his aides have offered public explanations for the governor's perplexing moves. In particular, they have not explained how giving federal authorities more time to build a case for Yucca Mountain or appointing a Yucca advocate to the nuclear projects board could possibly be interpreted as being in line with the state's opposition to the plan." Sen. Harry Reid (D-NV) said "this amounts to surrendering in Nevada's decades-long fight against the project". Rep. Shelley Berkley (D-NV) said "This demonstrates to me that he either doesn't know what he's doing or he's reversed his position."

During an April 23, 2010, debate for the Republican gubernatorial primary, Gibbons further confused his actual stance on Yucca Mountain by taking positions both favoring and opposing the federal waste dump over a two-minute period of time. "Gibbons then said he believed nuclear waste can be transported safely and that 'I can tell you, you can store it safely.'" However, when questioned by the moderator, Gibbons said he supported shutting down the Yucca Mountain facility.

=== Attempt for health care reimbursement from Mexico ===
In August 2007, Gibbons unsuccessfully attempted to obtain reimbursement from the Mexican government for the health care expenses of Mexican nationals.

=== State budget ===
In October 2007, Gibbons proposed cutting funding for state services by 5% and ordered state agencies to submit lists of the services to be cut. Among the state agencies that were ordered to cut their budgets were the Nevada System of Higher Education, Nevada Department of Taxation, child welfare agencies and the juvenile justice agency. Gibbons expected an 80 million dollar cut to come directly from the Health and Human services agency alone. Most of these agencies refused to submit revised budgets to Governor Gibbons, citing already "threadbare" budgets. The Nevada Department of Taxation closed the Elko, Nevada tax office in June 2010 in response to the requested cuts.

On November 21, 2007, Gibbons revised his proposal upward for cutting state budgets. Nevada agencies were then told to plan for 8% cuts.

In 2008, Gibbons suggested that the Nevada legislature cut the state budget for elementary, secondary and higher education by 14%., Jim Rogers, Nevada Chancellor for Education, said of the budget cuts, "We're talking about something that is going to cripple us financially and competitively. The effects will be felt on our economy for the next 50 to 100 years.". The Nevada Policy Research Institute criticized the governor's office for the budget, when the administration claimed that the state was facing a crisis, despite a 1% decrease in state spending.

== Criticism while governor ==
=== Undeclared donations ===
Gibbons set up a legal defense fund just before the November, 2006 gubernatorial election to help pay for legal expenses incurred after a woman accused him of attempted sexual assault. Gibbons neither reported the legal defense fund to the appropriate U.S. House of Representatives committee (even though he was a sitting congressman at the time and was required by House rules to do so), nor did he report donations to his legal defense fund as contributions to his gubernatorial campaign, citing the money was for "personal use" and not for "political purposes".

In January 2008, it was reported that Gibbons raised $256,000 for his legal defense fund during 2007, including a $61,000 personal loan Gibbons gave to his own fund, as well as $10,000 from the Palms Casino Resort, and $40,000 from various companies connected to Las Vegas Sands Corporation Chief Executive Sheldon Adelson. The defense fund has spent money to defend Gibbons in cases which include:

- Investigations into the allegations that Gibbons secured defense contracts for his friend Warren Trepp in exchange for gifts and money during his time in Congress, 1997–2006.
- A nepotism scandal regarding Sierra Nevada Corporation's hire of Nevada first lady Dawn Gibbons as a consultant. Sierra Nevada paid Dawn Gibbons $35,000 at the same time Jim Gibbons helped the company get a no-bid federal contract.
- Gibbons' alleged attempted sexual assault of a Las Vegas woman in 2006.
- Questions about Gibbons' employment of an illegal immigrant as a nanny.

=== Interference with an ongoing investigation ===
On August 3, 2007, the Las Vegas Review-Journal printed the following:

A newly available document states that Gov. Jim Gibbons "has admitted" that he urged federal authorities to pursue criminal action against a software developer whose business dispute with a friend of Gibbons has prompted a federal investigation. The statement is made in a legal motion filed last year, but kept secret until Tuesday, when it was unsealed at a judge's order.

The United States investigated Dennis Montgomery, the subject of the complaint by Governor Gibbons, was convicted and sent to Federal Prison for fraud.

=== Lamoille land deal ===
In 2007, Gibbons and his wife Dawn purchased 40 acres (160,000 m^{2}) of land in the ranch country near Lamoille, Nevada, approximately 20 miles South of Elko, Nevada. The land belonged to former Nevada Judge Jerry Carr Whitehead. The Elko County Assessor said he felt pressure from the governor, governor's lawyer and a member of the Nevada Tax Commission to lower the tax liability. Under state law, such an agricultural tax break goes only to legitimate farm and ranch operations, and must generate at least $5,000 a year in income. If such a land is developed by million-dollar homes, property taxes would go up. "To say I was put in an awkward position I think is an understatement", Joe Aguirre, a Republican, told The Associated Press in 2008. The opinion page of the Las Vegas Review-Journal said on the allegations that the deal might constitute fraud. Aguirre later admitted that his previous statements were made up on the Las Vegas Sun saying that he wasn't pressured into Gibbons tax break by Gibbons himself. The land deal was given to Gibbons himself after he finalized the divorce from his wife.

=== Dedication to office ===
While the state faced an economic slowdown and steep budget cuts, Gibbons faced criticism from officials for spending less time at his office. The Las Vegas Sun reviewed Gibbons' attendance and discovered that he was only in his Capitol office five days in August 2008 and never for a full eight hours. In September, he was in his office a total of seven days.

In an interview with Las Vegas Sun reporters, Gibbons said "I never knew this job had a time frame on it that requires me to be sitting behind a desk at a certain hour." He also said that he works about 60 hours a week for the state. Previous Nevada governors were also interviewed and they said that they felt it was necessary that they spent most of their time in the office.

Gibbons' dedication to his office was called into question again six months later. On April 2, 2009, while appearing before a legislative panel to promote his renewable energy bill, Gibbons pulled out his cellphone and began texting. News stories used this incident to revisit the 860 messages he sent to his alleged paramour, and a 37-second video of him introducing himself to the panel, with a 17-second break in order to send the text message and refocus on the hearing was posted on YouTube.

=== Approval rating ===
Polling conducted in June 2008 indicated an all-time low 10% approval rating, with 59% disapproving by the Las Vegas Review-Journal.

=== Broken tax pledge ===
Prior to running for Governor of Nevada, Gibbons signed the Taxpayer Protection Pledge (tax pledge) that is promoted at the national level by Americans for Tax Reform and at the state level by Citizen Outreach PAC—whose CEO is Chuck Muth. On at least three separate occasions, Americans for Tax Reform and/or Muth took Gibbons to task for breaking the tax pledge. Each time, in addition to the actual violation of the pledge, they had to correct the record about Gibbons' "misinformation", "fibs", "falsehoods" and "doublespeak".

Muth even went as far to say "the non-stop parsing and telling of falsehoods about breaking the Pledge are worse than breaking the Pledge itself".

=== Ethics group named Gibbons one of America's worst governors ===
In its April 2010 report, Citizens for Responsibility and Ethics in Washington (CREW), a left-of-center organization, named Gibbons one of 11 "worst governors" in the United States because of various ethics issues throughout Gibbons term as governor and his time in Congress. Some of Gibbons' ethics lapses cited by CREW include:

- Violated campaign finance law by accepting illegal corporate donations
- Overlooked ethical lapses of his appointee
- Endangered his state's economy by threatening to reject federal stimulus funds.
- Has been investigated for his conduct as a member of Congress

== Beliefs and ideologies ==
=== Civil liberties ===
- Voted YES on Constitutionally defining marriage as one-man-one-woman. (Jul 2006)
- Voted YES on constitutional amendment prohibiting flag desecration. (Jun 2003)
- Rated 7% by the ACLU, indicating what the group considers an "anti-civil liberties" voting record. (Dec 2002)
- Voted YES on making the PATRIOT Act permanent. (Dec 2005)

=== Education ===
==== As governor ====
In January 2007, Gibbons asked Nevada lawmakers to approve his budget that cut the percentage of education funding in Nevada to increase the percentage for public safety and human services programs.

In 2008, Gibbons suggested that the Nevada legislature cut the state general fund budget for elementary, secondary and higher education by 14% (this does not include federal or local revenues, or funds for construction or teacher pensions). Jim Rogers, former attorney, Nevada System of Higher Education interim chancellor, founder of the Intermountain West Communications Company and station owner of NBC affiliate KVBC (now KSNV), said of the budget cuts, "We're talking about something that is going to cripple us financially and competitively. The effects will be felt on our economy for the next 50 to 100 years.".

==== As representative ====
- Rated 10% by the NEA, indicating what the group considers "anti-public education spending" votes.
- Voted YES on allowing prayer in public schools during the War on Terror.
- Voted YES on letting public schools display the words "God Bless America".
- Supports a Constitutional Amendment for prayer in public schools.
- Gibbons supports No Child Left Behind.

=== Taxes ===
==== As governor ====
Gibbons pledged during his 1994 campaign for governor to not impose new taxes on businesses or individuals in Nevada. Gibbons broke his tax pledge on several occasions. The state's Business Tax on employer's payrolls which was initiated in 1992 was increased under Gibbon's term and renamed the "Modified Business Tax". Various mandatory fees and licenses administered by the Nevada Department of Taxation were also significantly increased under Gibbon's term. Most particularly was the State of Nevada's yearly business license fee. This license fee was doubled from $100.00 to $200.00. Due to the additional tax burden of the increased Modified Business Tax on Nevada's small businesses during a downward business cycle, this tax was readjusted to a lesser rate by the 2011 Nevada legislative session during the leadership of Governor Brian Sandoval who later broke his promises on not raising fees and taxes in 2015.

It was also discovered during the 2011 Nevada Legislative hearings that the Nevada Department of Taxation's director, Dino DiCianno, never had the Tax Department under Gibbon's leadership conduct Net Proceeds of Minerals (NPM) tax audits of mining operations within Nevada. DiCianno's claim was that the Tax Department did not have qualified auditors capable of performing NPM audits. During Gibbon's term market prices of precious minerals were at historical and significant high levels. The market selling price of Gold was in the $1,300 to $1,500+ per ounce range during Gibbon's term. Gibbons was also a geologist and lawyer.

During Gibbons term Nevada lead North America in Gold and Silver production. Also Nevada was ranked No. 3 in the world for Gold production. After Mr. DiCianno's testimony to the Nevada legislature that no NPM audits were conducted while Gibbon's was governor he resigned the following day. Governor Sandoval latter appointed William Chissel, a CPA with an auditing background as the replacement director of the Nevada Tax Department.

In the release of the Nevada's Department of Taxation's annual report in January 2012 which represented the fiscal year of July 1, 2010 through June 30, 2011, it was presented that the audit penetration rate (percentage of Nevada taxpayers audited of the total population of registered Nevada businesses) was the lowest amount in 6 years. The Tax Department during this 6-year period in the years 2006 and 2007, made a significant investment in new tax administration and audit software along with employee training to provide increased efficiency and audit performance. Accenture Consulting Services formerly a unit of Arthur Anderson & Co. was selected to design and implement the tax administration software. Revenue Solutions Inc. of Boston, Massachusetts was selected as a subcontractor by Accenture to design and implement the tax auditing software system.

Approximately $40,000,000.00 was invested in new tax administration and audit software. The results of this investment after implementation of this system as shown in Tax Department's annual reports (2008, 2009, 2010) have been abysmal.

During the first full year of leadership under the new director William Chissel, the Tax Department was fraught with turmoil and discontent. Chissel exited the director's position and was replaced by a former deputy attorney general assigned to the department, Christopher G. Nielsen. Nielsen assumed the executive director's duties on July 1, 2012. Mr. Nielsen was previously a deputy director of the Tax Department and was also an acting director after the termination of Dino DiCianno. Nielsen was in the position of acting director for several months prior to the appointment of William Chissel as executive director.

==== As congressman ====
- Voted YES on replacing illegal export tax breaks with $140B in new breaks. (Jun 2004)
- Voted YES on Bankruptcy Overhaul requiring partial debt repayment. (Mar 2001)
- Voted YES on Tax cut package of $958 B over 10 years. (May 2001)
- Voted YES on eliminating the federal estate tax. (Apr 2001)
- Voted YES on eliminating the marriage penalty. (Jul 2000)
- Rated 67% by NTU, indicating Satisfactory on tax votes. (Dec 2003)

== Electoral history ==
1996 election
Party	Candidate	Votes	%
Republican	Jim Gibbons	162,310	58.56
Democratic	Thomas "Spike" Wilson	97,942	35.26
Independent American	Daniel M. Hansen	8,780	3.17
Natural Law	Lois Avery	4,628	1.67
Libertarian	Louis R. Tomburello	3,732	1.35
Total votes		277,192	100.0
Republican hold			

1998 election
Party	Candidate	Votes	%
Republican	Jim Gibbons (Incumbent)	201,623	81.05
Independent American	Christopher Horne	20,738	8.34
Libertarian	Louis R. Tomburello	18,561	7.46
Natural Law	Robert W. Winquist	7,841	3.15
Total votes		248,763	100.0
Republican hold			

2000 election
Party	Candidate	Votes	%
Republican	Jim Gibbons (Incumbent)	229,608	64.50
Democratic	Tierney Cahill	106,379	29.88
Independent American	Daniel M. Hansen	5,582	1.57
Green	A. Charles Laws	5,547	1.56
Libertarian	Terry Savage	5,343	1.50
Citizens First	Ken Brenneman	2,367	0.66
Natural Law	Robert W. Winquist	1,143	0.32
Total votes		355,969	100.0
Republican hold			

2002 election
Party	Candidate	Votes	%
Republican	Jim Gibbons (Incumbent)	149,574	74.34
Democratic	Travis O. Souza	40,189	19.97
Independent American	Janine Hansen	7,240	3.60
Libertarian	Brendan Trainor	3,413	1.70
Natural Law	Robert W. Winquist	784	0.39
Total votes		201,200	100.0
Republican hold			

2004 election
Party	Candidate	Votes	%
Republican	Jim Gibbons (Incumbent)	195,466	67.15
Democratic	Angie G. Cochran	79,978	27.48
Independent American	Janine Hansen	10,638	3.65
Libertarian	Brendan Trainor	4,997	1.72
Total votes		291,079	100.0
Republican hold			

2006 Nevada gubernatorial election
Party	Candidate	Votes	%	±%
Republican	Jim Gibbons	279,003	47.93%	−20.32%
Democratic	Dina Titus	255,684	43.92%	+21.91%
None of These Candidates	None of These Candidates	20,699	3.56%	−1.14%
Independent American	Christopher H. Hansen	20,019	3.44%	+2.04%
Green	Craig Bergland	6,753	1.16%	+0.21%
Plurality		23,319	4.01%	-42.23%
Turnout		582,158		
Republican hold				

== Personal life ==
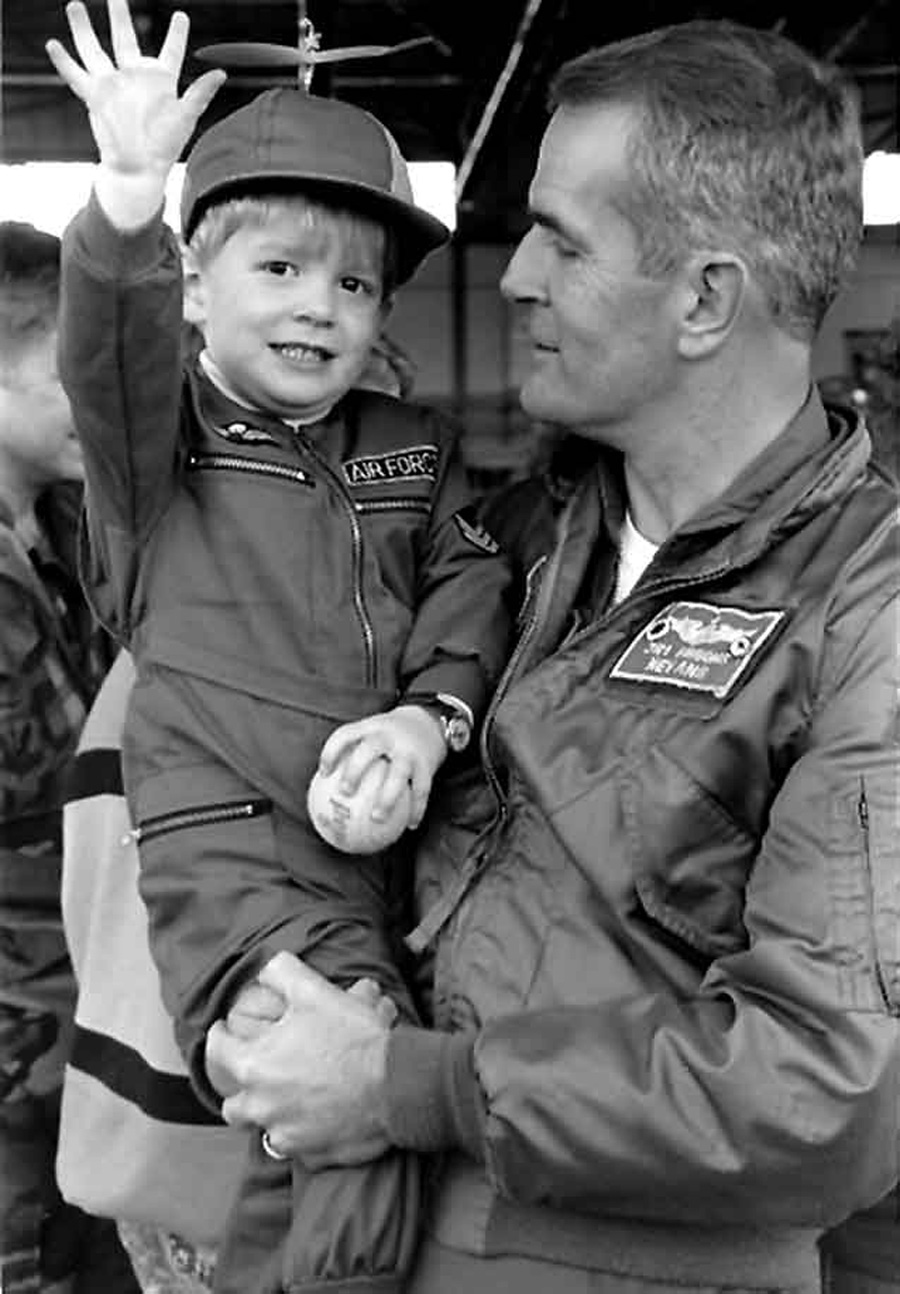
Gibbons with his son in 1990

He married Dawn Gibbons in 1985; they have a son, born in 1987. Dawn Gibbons did not move to Washington to live with her husband while he served in Congress, saying she preferred to raise their son in Nevada. She herself was elected to the Nevada State Assembly in 1998, two years after Jim Gibbons was elected to the U.S. House of Representatives. On May 2, 2008, Gibbons filed for divorce, citing grounds of incompatibility stemming from an undisclosed event in Reno, Nevada and requesting the court to determine whether Gibbons or his wife would live at the governor's mansion.

In April 2009, Gibbons was living in Reno; his wife, Dawn, remained in the governor's mansion in Carson City. An 1866 state law requires that governor must "keep his office and reside at the seat of government". A spokesman for Gibbons described the move by the governor back to the couple's Reno home, which they had owned since 1989, as a temporary situation and said there was no violation of the law.

In January 2010, the couple negotiated and completed an out-of-court divorce agreement. The divorce was finalized on July 21, 2010.

Party political offices
Preceded by Jim Gallaway	Republican nominee for Governor of Nevada; 1994	Succeeded by Kenny Guinn
Preceded by Kenny Guinn	Republican nominee for Governor of Nevada; 2006	Succeeded by Brian Sandoval
U.S. House of Representatives
Preceded by Barbara Vucanovich	Member of the U.S. House of Representatives from Nevada's 2nd congressional district 1997–2006	Succeeded by Dean Heller
Political offices
Preceded by Kenny Guinn	Governor of Nevada; 2007–2011	Succeeded by Brian Sandoval
U.S. order of precedence (ceremonial)
Preceded by Bob Miller as Former Governor	Order of precedence of the United States	Succeeded by Brian Sandoval as Former Governor
