= Doug Gillespie =

Doug Gillespie may refer to:

- Doug Gillespie (footballer)
- Doug Gillespie (politician)
