= Vegas (2012 TV series) =

2012 American period drama series

- Genre: Historical drama Crime drama
- Created by: Nicholas Pileggi; Greg Walker
- Starring: Dennis Quaid; Michael Chiklis; Carrie-Anne Moss; Taylor Handley; Sarah Jones; Jason O'Mara
- Country of origin: United States
- Original language: English
- No. of seasons: 1
- No. of episodes: 21

Production
- Executive producers: Greg Walker; Nicholas Pileggi; Arthur M. Sarkissian; Cathy Konrad; James Mangold; Dennis Quaid; Michael Chiklis
- Cinematography: Kramer Morgenthau
- Editor: Mark S. Manos
- Running time: 60 minutes
- Production companies: Happy Valley Films; Tree Line Film; Arthur Sarkissian Productions; CBS Television Studios

Original release
- Network: CBS
- Release: September 25, 2012 – May 10, 2013

Vegas is an American historical crime drama television series that ran on CBS from September 25, 2012 to May 10, 2013. The series starred Dennis Quaid and Michael Chiklis. The series was co-created by Las Vegas chronicler and Casino screenwriter Nicholas Pileggi, who also wrote the pilot.

Vegas received a 22-episode full season on October 23, 2012. CBS later reduced the order to 21 episodes. On March 7, 2013, CBS announced that Vegas would move to Friday nights at 9:00 p.m. ET, beginning April 5, 2013. On May 10, 2013, CBS canceled the series after one season.

== Synopsis ==
Set in 1960's Las Vegas, the series centers on Sheriff Ralph Lamb and his dealings with Chicago mobster Vincent Savino, who moved west to set up his own operation. The Lamb character is based on a real-life former rancher of the same name who served as Sheriff of Clark County from 1961 to 1979.

== Cast and characters ==
=== Main ===
- Dennis Quaid as Sheriff Ralph Lamb, a local rancher with service in the military police during World War II. Lamb is pressed into duty as Sheriff of Clark County when the Mob begins aggressively taking hold of the Las Vegas gambling industry.
- Michael Chiklis as Vincent Savino, manager of the Savoy Hotel, which is run by the Chicago Outfit. A gambling expert, Savino previously ran casinos for the Mob in Havana before being sent to run the Savoy. While being a high-ranking mob associate and close to Chicago mob capo Angelo LaFratta, he is not a made man due to being a quarter Irish on his father's side. At the same time, in other episodes he is said to be a full member of the Outfit.
- Carrie-Anne Moss as ADA Katherine O'Connell, the Las Vegas Assistant District Attorney and a longtime friend of the Lamb family.
- Jason O'Mara as Deputy Jack Lamb, Ralph's younger brother who serves as his deputy.
- Taylor Handley as Dixon Lamb, Ralph's son. His youthful exuberance sometimes makes it difficult for Ralph to trust his judgment.
- Sarah Jones as Mia Rizzo, the Savoy count room manager responsible for skimming funds for the Mob. She becomes romantically involved with Jack.

=== Recurring ===
- Aimee Garcia as Yvonne Sanchez, the receptionist working at the sheriff's station and Dixon's love interest.
- Vinessa Shaw as Laura Savino, Savino's wife.
- Michael O'Neill as Las Vegas mayor Ted Bennett, who is standing for re-election. He is later defeated, by an associate of Savino's.
- Shawn Doyle as Patrick Byrne, an FBI agent investigating Savino.
- Melinda Clarke as Lena Cavallo, Mia's mother.
- Enver Gjokaj as Tommy Stone, entertainment director at the Savoy.
- Michael Ironside as Porter Gainsley, a mining tycoon responsible for Ralph's wife's death and Savino's forced partner in acquiring the Tumbleweed for Chicago.
- Paul Ben-Victor as Barry Silver

==== The Mafia ====
- James Russo as Anthony "Red" Cervelli, Savino's right-hand man, who briefly ran The Savoy before being replaced by the more experienced Savino. While an experienced enforcer and hitman, he is often shown to be bumbling and inept, and somewhat friendlier than his associates.
- Michael Reilly Burke as Rich Reynolds, the corrupt district attorney.
- Michael Wiseman as Johnny Rizzo, Mia's father. Rizzo has a dangerous temper but is a major moneymaker for Chicago. He later becomes Chicago's boss of Las Vegas after killing Capo Angelo LaFratta.
- Jonathan Banks as Angelo LaFratta, one of the bosses from Chicago and leader of the Chicago Outfit's Las Vegas operations (though in one episode stated to be the head of the Outfit in its entirety). He is a close friend of Savino's, but this does not save the latter from nearly being executed for nearly starting a war with Milwaukee. He is killed and replaced by Johnny Rizzo on orders of the bosses, who did not approve of him returning The Tumbleweed casino to Milwaukee.
- Sonny Marinelli as Nicholas Cota, a mobster, and hitman for the Chicago Outfit who was working for Red when he ran the Savoy and continues to serve under Savino, whom he had met before the latter went running Chicago's Cuba operations.
- Joe Sabatino as Vic Borelli, another mobster from Chicago sent to Vegas to run The Savoy. Savino and he were good friends back home, and Savino is saddened when Milwaukee hitman Jones kills him out of payback for the death of Davey Cornaro.
- Jamie McShane as Davey Cornaro, leader of the Milwaukee crime family's operations in Vegas and Savino's first rival in his plight for control of The Tumbleweed. Cornaro controls a workers' union at the casino and orders an unsanctioned hit on Savino when told to drop it. He is later killed by Red Cervelli and Vic Borelli, who buries his body on a farm, where it is later found.
- Damon Herriman as Mr. Jones, a shady hitman from Milwaukee whose true name is a mystery. He is sent to investigate the disappearance of Davey Cornaro and returns to murder Savino when the body is found on a farm. After being captured by law enforcement, Jones escapes and is spared by Savino, who orders him to work for him alone. The hitman is key in helping the forces of Lamb and Savino take down Porter Gainsley.

== Creation and production ==
The idea for Vegas first came to Pileggi while he was researching the book Casino, and as a result of his research into the Las Vegas of the 70s and 80s, he decided to also write about the city in the era of the 60s. However, it was 25 years before the idea came to fruition as a TV series. Pileggi had initially planned to write the idea as a movie but found it difficult to make it work in the traditional three-act cinema form. Watching The Wire convinced him that the long-form TV series was a more suitable creative outlet for the story. Filming took place in Las Vegas, New Mexico.

== Episodes ==
No.	Title	Directed by	Written by	Original release date	US viewers (millions)
1	"Pilot"	James Mangold	Nicholas Pileggi & Greg Walker	September 25, 2012	14.85
In 1960 Ralph Lamb, a cattle rancher, is temporarily appointed sheriff when the actual sheriff goes missing and a young woman is found dead in the desert. Vincent Savino, a mobster from Chicago begins running the Savoy, a new casino, attracting Las Vegas' biggest high rollers.
2	"Money Plays"	Gary Fleder	Greg Walker & Nick Santora	October 2, 2012	12.11
Ralph investigates the murder of a craps dealer. Mia Rizzo, an accountant for Savino's mob family back in Chicago is hired as the new count room manager.
3	"All That Glitters"	Greg Beeman	Seth Hoffman	October 9, 2012	11.78
Johnny Rizzo, Mia's hot-headed father, who has a gambling problem, causes trouble for Savino's business while in town with Chicago's street boss Angelo LaFratta. An Olympic boxer is found dead in the street with his head bludgeoned.
4	"(Il) Legitimate"	Matt Earl Beesley	Ashley Gable	October 23, 2012	10.80
The Milwaukee Mob goes after Savino, when he sets his sights on a local casino. Ralph makes a surprising discovery during a murder investigation.
5	"Solid Citizens"	Roxann Dawson	Jim Adler	October 30, 2012	10.75
Savino appeals to his wife to move to Las Vegas. Ralph investigates the kidnapping of a casino board member's son.
6	"The Real Thing"	Alex Zakrzewski	Vanessa Reisen	November 13, 2012	10.41
Ralph and Savino work together to find out who has been making fake gambling chips that are being used at the Savoy. Savino endorses George Grady, a mayoral candidate running against Ted Bennett.
7	"Bad Seeds"	Jeff T. Thomas	Greg Walker & Nick Santora	November 20, 2012	10.12
After the Milwaukee mob Vegas guys are found dead on a farm weeks after their disappearance, the Milwaukee mob sends Mr. Jones back to rid Vegas of the Chicago mob, specifically Savino and his crew. Johnny and Angelo LaFratta travel back and forth to broker a deal with Milwaukee to prevent Savino's death and to prevent the Chicago mob's interest in Vegas from being wiped out completely. In the meantime, Vegas Mayoral election results are in. Ralph is officially elected the sheriff of Las Vegas by default, and Bennett loses as mayor. Vincent also is nearly killed when Angelo makes a deal with Milwaukee to keep the peace. However, the mob boss is killed by Johnny, who spares Savino and takes control of Vegas.
8	"Exposure"	Duane Clark	Seth Hoffman & Steven Levenson	November 27, 2012	9.35
Ralph investigates the murder of an air force doctor, who may have been killed for knowing about the use radiation at his air force base. Johnny Rizzo hires Diane Desmond, the new singer for the Savoy, who was formerly Savino's mistress.
9	"Masquerade"	Paul McCrane	Jim Adler	December 11, 2012	10.33
A showgirl is killed after being raped, the case affects Katherine personally. Savino tries to please an oil business high roller, during his stay at the Savoy.
10	"Estinto"	Anthony Hemingway	Vanessa Reisen & Nick Santora	December 18, 2012	9.82
A construction contractor working for Savino is found dead in a cement mixer. Dixon goes undercover at the Savoy to find who has been stealing merchandise from there. Ralph disagrees with Jack's relationship with Mia Rizzo.
11	"Paiutes"	Christine Moore	Steven Levenson & Greg Walker	January 8, 2013	10.92
Ralph is abducted and has flashbacks to a call from a sports book across town. A card cheat victimizes the casino. Savino has problems of his own when his bank loan is used by Johnny, and is forced to share The Tumbleweed with Porter Gainsley, a mining baron. Laura and Katherine continue their secret meetings.
12	"From This Day Forward"	James Whitmore, Jr.	Story by : Seth Hoffman & Nick Santora; Teleplay by : Seth Hoffman	January 15, 2013	11.27
An old flame of Ralph's shows up at the sheriff station looking for help and sparks fly. Dixon and Jack investigate a murder that is quickly tracked back to a divorce ranch outside of town. D.A. Reynolds tips off Savino about the case mounting against Rizzo which launches a rat hunt. After discovering it to be his own wife, Savino sends her back to Chicago after disowning her.
13	"Road Trip"	Frederick E. O. Toye	Nick Santora	January 29, 2013	11.23
Dixon investigates the attempted poisoning of a rising singer (Lili Simmons). Ralph and D.A. Reynolds scramble to relocate the escaped Milwaukee mobster Jones. Savino and his men become stranded in the desert after their car breaks down. Rizzo abducts Jack in an attempt to keep him away from Mia. After being tortured by Rizzo with a cattle prod, Jack is able to escape but not before killing the mob boss in self-defense.
14	"The Third Man"	Matt Earl Beesley	Vanessa Reisen & Jim Adler	February 5, 2013	10.25
Jack must hide his involvement with Rizzo's death from Mia, as well as Sheriff Lamb and the DA. Dixon investigates a grand theft auto ring. Savino encounters an issue with his entertainment lineup.
15	"Two of a Kind"	Jerry Levine	Jessica Queller & Steven Levenson	February 19, 2013	9.52
Dixon is assigned to watch over a rising Hollywood actress who is in town shooting a movie. Jack and Ralph investigate the murder of a traveling salesman. Savino begins blackmailing Jack with the knowledge of Rizzo's death, forcing Jack to confess to Mia and Ralph.
16	"Little Fish"	Paul McCrane	Seth Hoffman	April 5, 2013	7.59
FBI agent Byrne stops Sheriff Lamb from pressing charges against a pimp in order to get information on Savino instead.
17	"Hollywood Ending"	Michael Chiklis	Vanessa Reisen	April 12, 2013	7.20
Lamb, Jack and Katherine gather evidence using the phone tap in Savino's office making District Attorney Reynolds very nervous. Dixon and Yvonne arrive in Los Angeles to visit Violet at a movie studio. Yvonne auditions her singing voice at a big Hollywood party. Mia is shocked when her presumed dead mother, Lena, arrives at the Savoy.
18	"Scoundrels"	Christine Moore	Matt Payne	April 20, 2013	4.32
Dixon is booked for battery on a rising film starlet with whom he had previously had a fling. Sheriff Lamb, Jack, and D.A. Reynolds pursue a theory that the starlet's movie producer Barry Silver is behind the affair as a way to belittle Dixon in the eyes of his starlet. Meanwhile, Savino, along with Mia and her newly reacquainted mother, at the Savoy are tasked with recovering a significant watch stolen off a Savoy high-roller by a deceased conman.
19	"Past Lives"	Roxann Dawson	Katie Wech	April 26, 2013	7.50
Sheriff Lamb and Jack investigate the murder of a Savoy craps dealer and a suspect takes Mia hostage. Savino plots to play dirty with Gainsley when The Tumbleweed Casino reopens. Yvonne questions her new relationship with Dixon when her ethnic background becomes an issue. Mia and Jack reignite their romance.
20	"Unfinished Business"	Rosemary Rodriguez	Steven Levenson & Greg Walker	May 3, 2013	7.38
Lamb and Jack investigate the murder of Milton Krill, Porter Gainsley's attorney, in what looks like a mob hit. As they investigate Gainsley's past, Katherine suspects Gainsley killed Ralph's wife, Marilyn. Katherine is run off the road landing her in the hospital. Enraged, Lamb attacks Gainsley and is removed from office by the governor. Lamb goes to Savino for help. Savino finally manages to strongarm Gainsley out of the Tumbleweed. The night before Savino plans to reopen the Tumbleweed a bomb blows it up. Savino vows vengeance against Gainsley. Mia is torn between her job with Savino and her dating Jack.
21	"Sons of Nevada"	Duane Clark	Nick Santora & Greg Walker	May 10, 2013	7.20
Savino and Lamb decide to team up to take out Gainsley. Lamb turns over the taped recordings of Savino to prove his commitment to the new partnership. Savino and Lamb target Gainsley at a livestock auction but the plan is thwarted when Dixon turns up unannounced. Lamb is forced to turn to Jones for assistance. Jones pretends to switch sides in order to trick Gainsley, in return for his own freedom. Lamb decides to arrest Gainsley rather than kill him, to set an example for Dixon. Gainsley is turned over to the FBI, despite Savino wanting to kill him himself. Jack proposes to Mia but is devastated to find Tommy there wearing only a towel.

== International broadcasts ==
Country	Network(s)	Series premiere	Timeslot
Australia	Network Ten	October 14, 2012	Sunday 9.30 p.m.
Portugal	TVSéries	October 10, 2012	Wednesday 11 p.m.
United Kingdom; Ireland	Sky Atlantic	February 14, 2013	Thursday 10:00 p.m.
Canada	Global Television Network	September 25, 2012	Tuesday 10:00 p.m. ET/PT initially but Friday 9 p.m. from April 5, 2013 (may be simsubbed over CBS in some areas)
New Zealand	Prime (New Zealand)	February 28, 2013	Thursday 8:30 p.m.
Philippines	JACK City on BEAM Channel 31	October 20, 2012 / November 15, 2012	9:00 p.m. (special pilot screening) / Thursday 9:00 p.m. (regular)
Turkey	Fox Crime	March 18, 2013	Monday 11:00 p.m.
Bulgaria	Fox	March 7, 2013	Thursday 9:00 p.m.
Israel	Yes	March 23, 2013	Saturday 9:00 p.m.
Poland	Filmbox Extra	January 1, 2014	Wednesday 9.00 p.m.
Germany	Fox Channel	March 6, 2014	Thursday 9:00 p.m.
Latvia	LNT	March 12, 2014	Wednesday 10:40 p.m.
Russia	Первый Канал	December 8, 2014	Monday-Thursday 1.15 a.m.

== DVD release ==
The series was released on DVD as a five-disc set. All 21 episodes are included, as well as bonus features.

== See also ==
- List of television shows set in Las Vegas
