= Dawn Gibbons =

American politician

First Lady of Nevada
- In role January 1, 2007 – July 21, 2010
- Governor: Jim Gibbons
- Preceded by: Dema Guinn
- Succeeded by: Kathleen Teipner

Member of the Nevada Assembly from the 23rd district
- In office January 22, 1991 – April 16, 1991
- Preceded by: Jim Gibbons
- Succeeded by: Jim Gibbons

Member of the Nevada Assembly from the 25th district
- In office November 4, 1998 – November 3, 2004
- Preceded by: Brian Sandoval
- Succeeded by: Heidi Gansert

Personal details
- Born: March 9, 1954 (age 72) Atlanta, Georgia, U.S.
- Party: Republican
- Spouse: Jim Gibbons (m. 1985; div. 2010)
- Children: 1
- Education: University of Nevada, Reno

Dawn Snelling Gibbons (born March 9, 1954) is an American politician who served as the first lady of Nevada from 2007 to 2010, until her divorce from Governor Jim Gibbons on July 21, 2010. A member of the Republican Party, she served as a member of the Nevada Assembly in 1991, and again from 1998 to 2004.

== Early and personal life ==
Dawn Snelling Gibbons was born in Atlanta, Georgia and moved to Nevada at the age of 20. She graduated from the University of Nevada, Reno with a bachelor's degree in geological studies. Following graduation, she owned and operated two wedding chapels in Reno, Nevada. During this period, she met her future husband, Jim Gibbons, then a Delta Air Lines pilot. They married in 1986. Together they have one child, Jimmy, who served in the United States Navy.

== Political career ==
In 1991, Dawn Gibbons was appointed to represent part of Washoe County in the Nevada Assembly, filling a vacancy created when her husband resigned his seat in order to serve in the Persian Gulf War. She resigned from the state legislature in April 1991, allowing her husband to reclaim his seat. Following her husband's reappointment to the seat, she resumed her career in business.

In 1998, Gibbons was elected to the Nevada Assembly in her own right, serving until 2004. During the 2006 election season, she ran in the Republican Party primary to succeed her husband as Representative from Nevada's 2nd congressional district. However, Gibbons finished in third place behind Nevada Secretary of State Dean Heller (the eventual winner of both the primary and the general elections) and State Assemblywoman Sharron Angle. In that same election cycle, her husband won both the Republican primary and the general election to become Governor of Nevada, making her First Lady.

== Divorce ==
On May 2, 2008, Jim Gibbons filed for divorce on grounds of incompatibility, citing an undisclosed incident in Reno and asked the court to determine whether he or his wife would live at the Nevada Governor's Mansion in Carson City. In court filings, Dawn Gibbons alleged that her husband had been having affairs with two women. She also cited the attempted sexual assault that Jim Gibbons was alleged to have committed against a cocktail waitress in Las Vegas. On July 21, 2010, the divorce became final.

== Subsequent career ==
Gibbons' subsequent career has focused on media and public relations work. Gibbons debuted her talk radio show, The Dawn Gibbons Show on Fox News on March 30, 2010, with Nevada Assembly Republican Minority Leader Heidi Gansert and U.S. Senator Harry Reid as her first guests. Gibbons endorsed Reid in his re-election bid, saying he "was the only one to call to see how I was [after filing for divorce]. The only elected official to do that. He's a gift from God." Gibbons was the Senior Vice President of the now defunct Intermountain West Communications Company and was a radio talk show host for Fox News and co-hosted the Dawn & Jim Show (with Jim Rogers and the Dawn & Rory Show (with Rory Reid).

In 2017, Gibbons was appointed by Governor Brian Sandoval to the Nevada Transportation Authority, the state agency responsible for regulation of taxicabs, rideshare vehicles, limousines, tow trucks, and other similar vehicles. Gibbons currently serves as Chair of the Authority.

== Elections ==
- 2006 Incumbent Congressman Jim Gibbons ran for Governor of Nevada instead of running for re-election in Nevada's 2nd congressional district. Dawn Gibbons placed third in the primary to succeed him with 17,317 votes (25.1%).
- 2002 Gibbons was unopposed in the primary and won the general election with 17,426 votes (84.40%) against Independent American nominee Doug Brozyna.
- 2000 Gibbons was unopposed in the primary and won the general election with 12,366 votes (82.32%) against Independent American nominee Doug Brozyna.
- 1998 the 25th Assembly District was vacant due to the appointment of incumbent Brian Sandoval to the Nevada Gaming Commission. Gibbons won the Republican primary with 2,977 votes (50.17%) against former State Treasurer Patricia Dillon Cafferata. She was then unopposed in the general election due to the district's strong Republican lean.

Nevada Assembly
| Preceded by Jim Gibbons | Member of the Nevada Assembly from the 23rd legislative district 1991 | Succeeded by Jim Gibbons |
| Preceded by Brian Sandoval | Member of the Nevada Assembly from the 25th legislative district 1999–2003 | Succeeded by Heidi Gansert |
