= Senator Lamb =

Senator Lamb may refer to:

- Floyd Lamb (1914–2002), Nevada State Senate
- Howard Lamb (1924–2015), Nebraska State Senate
- Norman Lamb (American politician) (1935–2018), Oklahoma State Senate
- Thomas F. Lamb (1922–2015), Pennsylvania State Senate
- Todd Lamb (politician) (born 1971), Oklahoma State Senate
