= Donna Lombardo =

First Lady of Nevada since 2023

First Lady of Nevada
- Current
- Assumed role January 2, 2023
- Governor: Joe Lombardo
- Preceded by: Kathy Sisolak

Personal details
- Party: Republican
- Spouse: Joe Lombardo (m. 2015)
- Children: 3
- Education: University of Nevada, Las Vegas (BS)

Donna Lombardo is an American businesswoman who has served as the first lady of Nevada since 2023 as the wife of Governor Joe Lombardo.

== Early life and education ==
Lombardo moved to Nevada when she was in second grade. She graduated from Valley High School in Las Vegas and later earned a Bachelor of Science degree in marketing from the University of Nevada, Las Vegas in 1987.

== Career ==
Lombardo began her career in real estate in the mid-1980s and worked for CBRE, a commercial real estate brokerage, where she completed more than 1,400 transactions valued at over $2.4 billion, including the sale of 1,800 acres of land and more than 48 million square feet of building transactions. She has spent more than three decades in the industry and currently specializes in industrial sales and leasing. Lombardo serves as the executive managing director at Cushman & Wakefield in Las Vegas.

== First lady of Nevada (2023–present) ==
Lombardo became first lady of Nevada on January 2, 2023, when her husband, Joe Lombardo, was sworn in as governor.

As first lady, she has focused on mental health advocacy, education, and support for small businesses. In June 2024, Lombardo and her daughter Lacey hosted a charity luncheon at the Nevada Governor's Mansion to connect non-profits and organizations across the state. In her first televised interview as first lady, Lombardo described herself as a “private person” who prefers to focus on meaningful community work rather than public attention. She has stated that her passion for mental health stems from personal connections to loved ones who have faced mental illness.

== Personal life ==
Lombardo and her husband Joe married in 2015. They have three children and a grandson.

== See also ==
- List of governors of Nevada
