= Ralph Lamb =

American law enforcement official

11th Sheriff of Clark County
- In office 1961–1979
- Preceded by: Butch Leypoldt
- Succeeded by: John McCarthy

Personal details
- Born: Ralph James Lamb; April 10, 1927 Alamo, Nevada, U.S.
- Died: July 3, 2015 (aged 88) Summerlin, Nevada, U.S.
- Resting place: Bunkers Memory Gardens Cemetery, Las Vegas
- Party: Republican
- Children: Clint Lamb, Cliff Lamb
- Relatives: Floyd Lamb (brother)

Military service
- Allegiance: United States
- Branch/service: United States Army

Ralph James Lamb (April 10, 1927 – July 3, 2015) was an American law enforcement officer and the 11th Sheriff of Clark County from 1961 to 1979. He was a member of the Republican Party.

Lamb was born in Alamo, Nevada, one of 11 children born to his mother and father. His father, William Grainger Lamb died in a rodeo accident by trying to stop a fractious horse from heading through the crowds on July 3, 1939, in Fallon, Nevada, at the age of 46, when Lamb was 12 years old. His father was buried at Alamo Cemetery in Alamo, Nevada. Lamb and his siblings took odd jobs to help make ends meet during the Great Depression. He enlisted in the Army and served in the Pacific Theater during World War II. He returned to Nevada and took a position as Clark County Deputy Sheriff. He left in 1954 to start his own private detective agency.

In 1958, he ran for election as Sheriff of Clark County, but lost to Butch Leypoldt. Leypoldt served until 1961, when he resigned and was appointed to the Nevada Gaming Control Board. Lamb was named his successor by the Clark County Commission and served until 1979, after losing re-election to John McCarthy in 1978. Lamb spearheaded the charge against the mafia moving into Las Vegas during that time.

Lamb ran for election again as Sheriff of Clark County as a Republican and lost to Democrat Jerry Keller on November 8, 1994.

On September 25, 2012, a show titled Vegas was aired on CBS, based on Lamb's time as Sheriff. Dennis Quaid portrayed Lamb. The show was cancelled after one season on May 10, 2013.

Lamb died on July 3, 2015, at Mountain View Hospital of complications from surgery in Summerlin, Nevada, at the age of 88.

== See also ==
- Floyd Lamb, Ralph's older brother and former member of the Nevada Senate
