= 2010 Nevada gubernatorial election =

- November 2, 2010
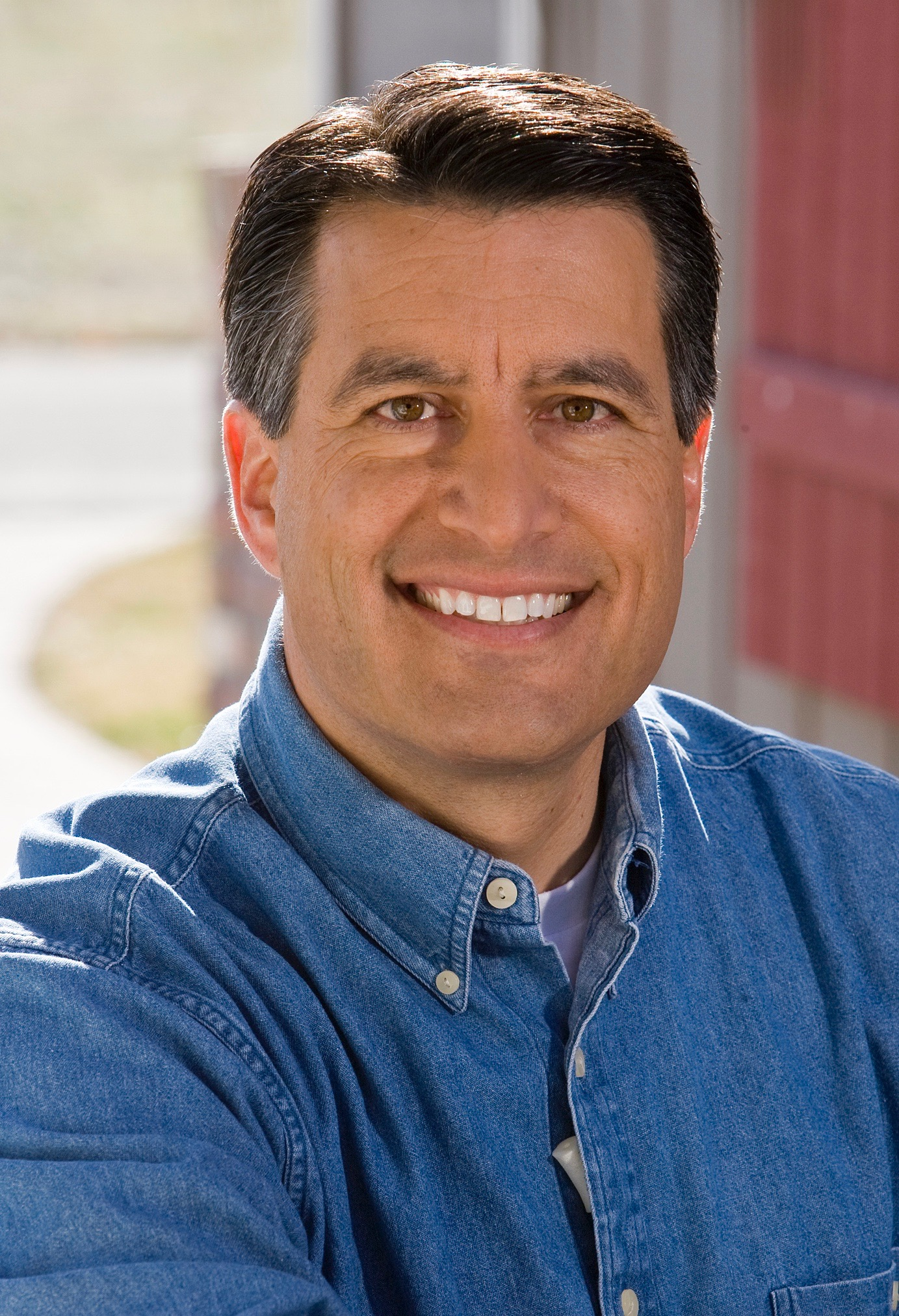

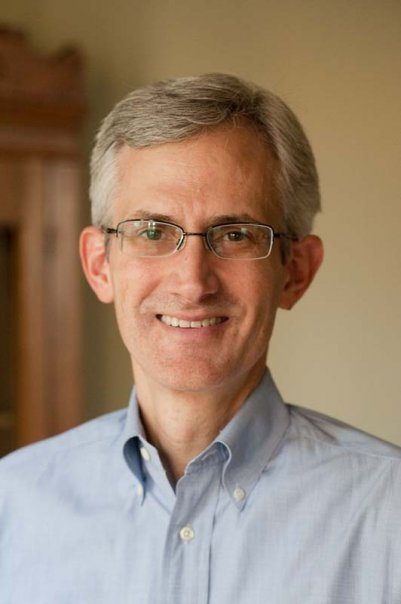
| Nominee | Brian Sandoval | Rory Reid |
| Party | Republican | Democratic |
| Popular vote | 382,350 | 298,170 |
| Percentage | 53.36% | 41.61% |
- Sandoval: 40–50% 50–60% 60–70% 70–80% Reid: 50–60%
Governor before election
Jim Gibbons
Republican
Elected Governor
Brian Sandoval
Republican

The 2010 Nevada gubernatorial election was held on Tuesday, November 2, 2010, to elect the governor of Nevada, who would serve a four-year term to begin on January 3, 2011. Despite speculation that incumbent Republican governor Jim Gibbons would not run for a second term due to low approval ratings, he ran for re-election. He struggled in the polls, and ultimately federal judge and former attorney general of Nevada Brian Sandoval secured the nomination. Sandoval defeated Democrat Rory Reid, son of then-current U.S. Senate Majority Leader Harry Reid, who won his fifth term in the Senate on the same ballot.

== Republican primary ==
=== Candidates ===
A total of five Republican candidates filed with the Secretary of State of Nevada and qualified for the ballot.

==== Declared ====
- Tony Atwood
- Jim Gibbons, incumbent governor
- Stan Lusak, perennial candidate
- Mike Montandon, Mayor of North Las Vegas
- Brian Sandoval, former judge of the United States District Court for the District of Nevada and former Nevada Attorney General

==== Withdrew ====
- Joe Heck, former state senator (ran for NV-03 and won)

=== Polling ===
| Poll source | Date(s) administered | Sample size | Margin of error | Jim Gibbons | Mike Montandon | Brian Sandoval | Undecided |
|---|---|---|---|---|---|---|---|
| Research 2000 | June 2, 2010 | — | — | 27% | 6% | 48% | — |
| Mason Dixon/LVJR | May 10–11, 2010 | — | — | 27% | 6% | 45% | — |
| Mason Dixon/LVJR | April 10, 2010 | — | — | 25% | 7% | 39% | — |
| Mason Dixon/LVJR | February 22–24, 2010 | — | — | 30% | 9% | 37% | — |
| Mason Dixon/LVJR | January 10, 2010 | — | — | 23% | 7% | 39% | — |
| Mason Dixon/LVJR | December 2009 | — | — | 18% | 6% | 39% | — |
| Mason Dixon/LVJR | October 8, 2009 | — | — | 20% | 4% | 41% | — |
| Mason Dixon/LVJR | August 21, 2009 | — | — | 17% | 3% | 33% | — |

=== Results ===
Republican primary results by county: Sandoval: 60–70%; 50–60%; 40–50%; Gibbons: <40%

Republican primary results
| Party | Candidate | Votes | % |
|---|---|---|---|
| Republican | Brian Sandoval | 97,201 | 55.53% |
| Republican | Jim Gibbons (incumbent) | 47,616 | 27.20% |
| Republican | Mike Montandon | 22,003 | 12.57% |
| | None of These Candidates | 4,400 | 2.51% |
| Republican | Tony Atwood | 2,440 | 1.39% |
| Republican | Stan Lusak | 1,380 | 0.79% |
| Total votes | | 175,040 | 100.00% |

== Democratic primary ==
=== Candidates ===
Two Democratic candidates filed with the Secretary of State of Nevada and qualified for the ballot.

==== Declared ====
- Frederick Conquest, anthropology professor
- Rory Reid, Clark County Commissioner and son of Senate Majority Leader Harry Reid

==== Declined ====
- Barbara Buckley, Speaker of the Nevada Assembly

=== Polling ===
Hypothetical polling

| Poll source | Date(s) administered | Sample size | Margin of error | Barbara Buckley | Oscar Goodman | Rory Reid | Undecided |
|---|---|---|---|---|---|---|---|
| Mason Dixon/LVJR | August 21, 2009 | — | — | 25% | 34% | 13% | — |
| Mason Dixon/LVJR | August 21, 2009 | — | — | 43% | — | 22% | — |

=== Results ===
Democratic primary results by county: Reid: Reid—70–80%; Reid—60–70%; Reid—50–60%; Reid—40–50%; Reid—<40%; Conquest: Conquest—<40%

Democratic primary results
| Party | Candidate | Votes | % |
|---|---|---|---|
| Democratic | Rory Reid | 80,162 | 70.08% |
| | None of These Candidates | 17,454 | 15.26% |
| Democratic | Frederick Conquest | 16,775 | 14.66% |
| Total votes | | 114,391 | 100.00% |

== Other candidates ==
=== Independents ===
==== Declared ====
- Eugene "Gino" DiSimone
- Aaron Y. Honig

==== Declined ====
- Oscar Goodman, Mayor of Las Vegas

=== Green ===
- David Scott Curtis

=== Independent American ===
- Floyd Fitzgibbons

=== Libertarian ===
- Arthur Forest Lampitt

== General election ==
=== Predictions ===
| Source | Ranking | As of |
|---|---|---|
| Cook Political Report | Likely R | October 14, 2010 |
| Rothenberg | Safe R | October 28, 2010 |
| RealClearPolitics | Likely R | November 1, 2010 |
| Sabato's Crystal Ball | Likely R | October 28, 2010 |
| CQ Politics | Tossup | October 28, 2010 |

=== Polling ===
| Poll source | Date(s) administered | Sample size | Margin of error | Brian Sandoval (R) | Rory Reid (D) | Other | Undecided |
|---|---|---|---|---|---|---|---|
| Rasmussen Reports | October 5, 2010 | — | — | 59% | 41% | — | — |
| Rasmussen Reports | September 28, 2010 | — | — | 49% | 40% | — | — |
| Public Opinion Strategies | September 21–23, 2010 | — | — | 45% | 39% | — | — |
| Rasmussen Reports | September 21, 2010 | — | — | 49% | 35% | — | — |
| CNN/Time Magazine | September 10–14, 2010 | — | — | 58% | 31% | — | — |
| Reuters/Ipsos | September 10–12, 2010 | — | — | 60% | 31% | — | — |
| Mason-Dixon | September 9, 2010 | — | — | 52% | 36% | — | — |
| Rasmussen Reports | September 1, 2010 | 750 | ± 4% | 58% | 33% | 2% | 7% |
| Mason-Dixon | August 23–25, 2010 | — | — | 53% | 31% | — | — |
| Rasmussen Reports | August 16, 2010 | 750 | ± 4% | 52% | 36% | 3% | 8% |
| Mason-Dixon | August 11, 2010 | — | — | 52% | 36% | — | — |
| Rasmussen Reports | July 27, 2010 | 750 | ± 4% | 50% | 40% | 6% | 4% |
| Public Policy Polling | July 16–18, 2010 | — | — | 52% | 38% | — | — |
| Mason Dixon/LVJR | July 12–14, 2010 | — | — | 47% | 36% | — | — |
| Rasmussen Reports | July 12, 2010 | 750 | ± 4% | 57% | 36% | 3% | 4% |
| Rasmussen Reports | June 22, 2010 | 500 | ± 4.5% | 55% | 33% | 8% | 4% |
| Rasmussen Reports | June 9, 2010 | 500 | ± 4.5% | 54% | 31% | 3% | 13% |
| Research 2000 | June 2, 2010 | — | — | 51% | 41% | — | — |
| Rasmussen Reports | April 27, 2010 | 500 | ± 4.5% | 53% | 35% | 12% | 3% |
| Mason Dixon/LVJR | April 10, 2010 | — | — | 50% | 35% | — | — |
| Rasmussen Reports | March 31, 2010 | 500 | ± 4.5% | 55% | 34% | 6% | 4% |
| Rasmussen Reports | March 3, 2010 | 500 | ± 4.5% | 53% | 35% | 7% | 5% |
| Mason Dixon/LVJR | February 22–24, 2010 | — | — | 51% | 29% | — | — |
| Rasmussen Reports | February 3, 2010 | 500 | ± 4.5% | 45% | 33% | 11% | 12% |
| Mason Dixon/LVJR | January 10, 2010 | — | — | 53% | 31% | — | — |
| Mason Dixon/LVJR | December 4, 2009 | — | — | 49% | 35% | — | — |
| Mason Dixon/LVJR | October 8, 2009 | — | — | 50% | 33% | — | — |

Hypothetical polling

With Gibbons

| Poll source | Date(s) administered | Sample size | Margin of error | Jim Gibbons (R) | Rory Reid (D) | Other | Undecided |
|---|---|---|---|---|---|---|---|
| Research 2000 | June 2, 2010 | — | — | 31% | 52% | — | — |
| Rasmussen Reports | April 27, 2010 | 500 | ± 4.5% | 37% | 47% | 12% | 3% |
| Mason Dixon/LVJR | April 10, 2010 | — | — | 40% | 42% | — | — |
| Rasmussen Reports | March 31, 2010 | 500 | ± 4.5% | 45% | 43% | 8% | 4% |
| Rasmussen Reports | March 3, 2010 | 500 | ± 4.5% | 36% | 44% | 15% | 4% |
| Mason Dixon/LVJR | February 22–24, 2010 | — | — | 38% | 42% | — | — |
| Rasmussen Reports | February 3, 2010 | 500 | ± 4.5% | 35% | 44% | 13% | 8% |
| Mason Dixon/LVJR | December 2009 | — | — | 34% | 48% | — | — |
| Mason Dixon/LVJR | October 8, 2009 | — | — | 37% | 49% | — | — |
| Mason Dixon/LVJR | August 21, 2009 | — | — | 35% | 47% | — | — |

With Montandon

| Poll source | Date(s) administered | Sample size | Margin of error | Mike Montandon (R) | Rory Reid (D) | Other | Undecided |
|---|---|---|---|---|---|---|---|
| Research 2000 | June 2, 2010 | — | — | 40% | 43% | — | — |
| Rasmussen Reports | April 27, 2010 | 500 | ± 4.5% | 45% | 39% | 9% | 8% |
| Rasmussen Reports | March 31, 2010 | 500 | ± 4.5% | 45% | 38% | 9% | 8% |
| Rasmussen Reports | March 3, 2010 | 500 | ± 4.5% | 42% | 37% | 13% | 8% |
| Rasmussen Reports | February 3, 2010 | 500 | ± 4.5% | 36% | 40% | 14% | 10% |

=== Results ===
Nevada gubernatorial election, 2010
| Party | Candidate | Votes | % | ±% |
|---|---|---|---|---|
| Republican | Brian Sandoval | 382,350 | 53.36% | +5.44% |
| Democratic | Rory Reid | 298,171 | 41.61% | −2.31% |
| | None of These Candidates | 12,231 | 1.71% | −1.85% |
| Independent | Eugene DiSimone | 6,403 | 0.89% | +0.89% |
| Independent American | Floyd Fitzgibbons | 5,049 | 0.70% | −2.73% |
| Libertarian | Arthur Forest Lampitt, Jr. | 4,672 | 0.65% | +0.65% |
| Green | David Scott Curtis | 4,437 | 0.62% | −0.54% |
| Independent | Aaron Y. Honig | 3,216 | 0.45% | +0.45% |
| Majority | | 84,179 | 11.75% | |
| Total votes | | 716,529 | 100.00% | |
| Republican hold | | Swing | +7.74% | |

==== By county ====
| County | Brian Sandoval Republican | | Rory Reid Democratic | | None of These Candidates | | Eugene DiSimone Independent | | Floyd Fitzgibbons Independent American | | Arthur Forest Lampitt Jr. Libertarian | | David Scott Curtis Green | | Aaron Y. Honig Independent | | Margin | | Total votes cast |
| County | # | % | # | % | # | % | # | % | # | % | # | % | # | % | # | % | # | % | Total votes cast |
|---|---|---|---|---|---|---|---|---|---|---|---|---|---|---|---|---|---|---|---|
| Carson City | 11,512 | 59.06% | 6,676 | 34.25% | 511 | 2.62% | 267 | 1.37% | 208 | 1.07% | 115 | 0.59% | 132 | 0.68% | 71 | 0.36% | 4,836 | 24.81% | 19,492 |
| Churchill | 6,586 | 74.19% | 1,697 | 19.12% | 167 | 1.88% | 117 | 1.32% | 145 | 1.63% | 60 | 0.68% | 57 | 0.64% | 48 | 0.54% | 4,889 | 55.07% | 8,877 |
| Clark | 224,751 | 48.61% | 217,113 | 46.96% | 7,008 | 1.52% | 3,598 | 0.78% | 2,347 | 0.51% | 2,837 | 0.61% | 2,547 | 0.55% | 2,171 | 0.47% | 7,638 | 1.65% | 462,372 |
| Douglas | 15,001 | 69.10% | 5,345 | 24.62% | 396 | 1.82% | 328 | 1.51% | 231 | 1.06% | 139 | 0.64% | 192 | 0.88% | 76 | 0.35% | 9,656 | 44.48% | 21,708 |
| Elko | 9,489 | 73.97% | 2,194 | 17.10% | 321 | 2.50% | 159 | 1.24% | 394 | 3.07% | 102 | 0.80% | 99 | 0.77% | 71 | 0.55% | 7,295 | 56.86% | 12,829 |
| Esmeralda | 289 | 72.61% | 48 | 12.06% | 20 | 5.03% | 6 | 1.51% | 11 | 2.76% | 12 | 3.02% | 7 | 1.76% | 5 | 1.26% | 241 | 60.55% | 398 |
| Eureka | 597 | 78.97% | 76 | 10.05% | 31 | 4.10% | 9 | 1.19% | 20 | 2.65% | 12 | 1.59% | 10 | 1.32% | 1 | 0.13% | 521 | 68.92% | 756 |
| Humboldt | 3,564 | 71.61% | 994 | 19.97% | 120 | 2.41% | 84 | 1.69% | 116 | 2.33% | 50 | 1.00% | 23 | 0.46% | 26 | 0.52% | 2,570 | 51.64% | 4,977 |
| Lander | 1,449 | 76.42% | 277 | 14.61% | 61 | 3.22% | 28 | 1.48% | 33 | 1.74% | 16 | 0.84% | 20 | 1.05% | 12 | 0.63% | 1,172 | 61.81% | 1,896 |
| Lincoln | 1,381 | 70.93% | 380 | 19.52% | 72 | 3.70% | 17 | 0.87% | 48 | 2.47% | 26 | 1.34% | 12 | 0.62% | 11 | 0.56% | 1,001 | 51.41% | 1,947 |
| Lyon | 11,937 | 68.46% | 4,331 | 24.84% | 340 | 1.95% | 226 | 1.30% | 266 | 1.53% | 113 | 0.65% | 139 | 0.80% | 85 | 0.49% | 7,606 | 43.62% | 17,437 |
| Mineral | 1,136 | 59.88% | 556 | 29.31% | 89 | 4.69% | 36 | 1.90% | 43 | 2.27% | 10 | 0.53% | 18 | 0.95% | 9 | 0.47% | 580 | 30.57% | 1,897 |
| Nye | 8,829 | 61.49% | 4,224 | 29.42% | 289 | 2.01% | 221 | 1.54% | 349 | 2.43% | 206 | 1.43% | 144 | 1.00% | 97 | 0.68% | 4,605 | 32.07% | 14,359 |
| Pershing | 1,140 | 65.86% | 396 | 22.88% | 85 | 4.91% | 32 | 1.85% | 42 | 2.43% | 10 | 0.58% | 11 | 0.64% | 15 | 0.87% | 744 | 42.98% | 1,731 |
| Storey | 1,355 | 63.70% | 615 | 28.91% | 53 | 2.49% | 35 | 1.65% | 26 | 1.22% | 14 | 0.66% | 22 | 1.03% | 7 | 0.33% | 740 | 34.79% | 2,127 |
| Washoe | 81,073 | 57.72% | 52,730 | 37.54% | 2,555 | 1.82% | 1,156 | 0.82% | 685 | 0.49% | 811 | 0.58% | 970 | 0.69% | 488 | 0.35% | 28,343 | 20.18% | 140,468 |
| White Pine | 2,261 | 69.40% | 519 | 15.93% | 113 | 3.47% | 84 | 2.58% | 85 | 2.61% | 139 | 4.27% | 34 | 1.04% | 23 | 0.71% | 1,742 | 53.47% | 3,258 |
| Totals | 382,350 | 53.36% | 298,171 | 41.61% | 12,231 | 1.71% | 6,403 | 0.89% | 5,049 | 0.70% | 4,672 | 0.65% | 4,437 | 0.62% | 3,216 | 0.45% | 84,179 | 11.75% | 716,529 |

Counties that flipped from Democratic to Republican

- Clark (largest municipality: Las Vegas)

== See also ==
- 2010 United States gubernatorial elections
