= Bob Kerns =

American politician

Member of the Nevada Assembly from the 25th district
- In office November 3, 1982 – October 15, 1991
- Preceded by: Patty Cafferata
- Succeeded by: Jim Gibbons

Personal details
- Born: December 8, 1930 Wray, Colorado, U.S.
- Died: October 15, 1991 Valley County, Idaho, U.S.
- Party: Republican
- Spouse: Ruth Kerns
- Children: 2

Military service
- Battles/wars: Korean War

Bob Kerns (1930 – 1991) was an American politician who served as a member of the Nevada Assembly from 1982 to 1991 for the 25th district (parts of Washoe County). Kerns served as assistant majority leader in the 1985 legislative session.

== Early life ==
Kerns was born in 1930 in Wray, Colorado. He was a tank commander in the Korean War, after which he married his wife Ruth and moved to Reno.

== Career ==
Kerns served as a firefighter with the Reno Fire Department and also owned his own real estate business.

Kerns initially ran for the Nevada Assembly in 1980, but lost the primary to incumbent Patty Cafferata by one vote. In 1982, Cafferata vacated the seat and Kerns won election. Kerns was then elected to represent Assembly District 25 until his death in office in 1991, either running unopposed or with substantial victory margins due to the strong Republican lean of the district. Kerns served as Assistant Majority Leader in the 1985 session.

== Elections ==
- 1990: Kerns was unopposed in the primary and won the general election with 6,683 votes (82.91%) against Libertarian nominee Joe Leising.
- 1988: Kerns was unopposed in the primary and won the general election with 6,318 votes (65.82%) against Democratic nominee Elizabeth Shay.
- 1986: The only candidates who filed for election were Kerns and another Republican. Under the jungle primary procedure then in effect, there was no primary election and both candidates faced off in the general election. Kerns won the general election with 5,667 votes (74.97%) against Thomas Purkey.
- 1984: Kerns was unopposed in both the primary and general elections.
- 1982: After Cafferrata vacated Assembly District 25 to successfully run for Treasurer, Kerns won the 1982 primary election with 2,064 votes (62.41%) against S.T. Bradhurst and another candidate. He then won the general election with 5,286 votes (73.27%) against Democratic nominee D. Dondero.
- 1980: Kerns ran in the primary election for Assembly District 25 against incumbent Patty Cafferata. He received 1,294 votes (49.98%), losing the primary by one vote.
