= Floyd Lamb =

American politician (1914–2002)

Member of the Nevada Senate
- In office 1956–1983

Member of the Lincoln County Commission
- In office 1946–1956

Personal details
- Born: Floyd Roland Lamb; September 3, 1914 Alamo, Nevada, U.S.
- Died: June 2, 2002 (aged 87) Alamo, Nevada, U.S.
- Party: Democratic
- Relatives: Ralph Lamb (brother)
- Profession: Banker and rancher

Floyd Roland Lamb (September 3, 1914 – June 2, 2002) was an American politician and a Democratic member of the Nevada Senate from 1956 to 1983. From 1946 to 1956, Lamb joined the Lincoln County Commission until he was elected to the senate.

In 1956, Lamb represented Lincoln County and in 1965 Lamb moved to Las Vegas where he represented Clark County and served as Chairman of the Senate Finance Committee until 1983.

== Legacy ==
In 1977, Lamb convinced the Nevada Legislature to acquire Tule Springs Park from the then financially troubled city of Las Vegas and the park was later renamed Floyd Lamb Park.

Also, Lamb Boulevard in Las Vegas is named after him and/or his brother, Ralph Lamb, a former Clark County Sheriff who served from 1961 to 1979.

== Conviction ==
Lamb and other Nevada politicians, including Clark County commissioner Woodrow Wilson, were forced to resign after they were convicted in 1983 for taking a $23,000 bribe in an FBI sting operation (Operation Yobo). Lamb spent 9 months in prison, then he was paroled and his civil rights were restored by the state Pardons Board.

== See also ==
- Ralph Lamb, Floyd's younger brother and former Sheriff of Clark County
