= Doug Gillespie (politician) =

American police officer (born 1958)

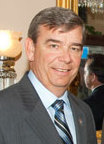

16th Sheriff of Clark County
- In office January 2, 2007 – January 5, 2015
- Preceded by: Bill Young
- Succeeded by: Joe Lombardo

Personal details
- Born: Douglas Charles Gillespie; August 13, 1958 (age 68) Abington, Pennsylvania, U.S.
- Party: Republican (1990–present)
- Education: Rochester Institute of Technology (B.S.)

Douglas Charles Gillespie (born August 13, 1958) is an American retired law enforcement officer. He served as the 16th Sheriff of Clark County, Nevada from 2007 to 2015. He is a member of the Republican Party.

== History ==
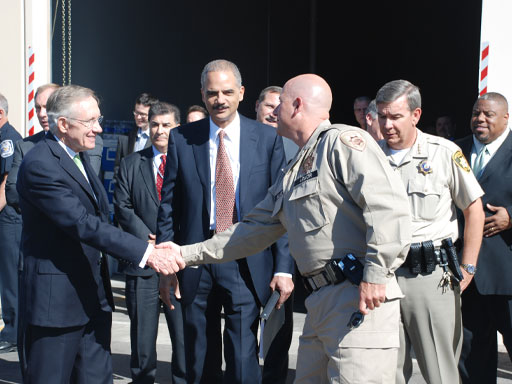
Harry Reid (left), Eric Holder (middle) and Gillespie (right) in 2009.

On January 20, 2010, Gillespie met with Democratic U.S. Senator Harry Reid to talk about funding for law enforcement grants.

Gillespie began his work as a lew enforcement officer in Las Vegas and made an appearance on the show Cops as a K-9 sergeant during the 3rd season.

On February 9, 2010, Gillespie responded to the budget woes of the Las Vegas Metropolitan Police Department (LVMPD).

On February 13, 2013, Gillespie called for gun control legislation.

On April 19, 2013, Gillespie announced his re-election bid as Sheriff of Clark County.

On August 26, 2013, Gillespie withdrew his re-election bid as Sheriff of Clark County.

On December 4, 2013, Joe Lombardo announced his candidacy for Sheriff of Clark County after Gillespie and Bill Young endorsed Lombardo as Sheriff of Clark County in the Republican primary and the general election.

On March 20, 2014, Gillespie received Congressional Proclamation from Democratic U.S. Senator Harry Reid.

On April 12, 2014, anti-government activist Cliven Bundy "ordered" Sheriff Gillespie to confront the federal Bureau of Land Management agents, disarm them and deliver their arms to Bundy within an hour of his demand, and later expressed disappointment that Gillespie did not comply.

On July 14, 2014, Gillespie announced that the Las Vegas Metropolitan Police Department (LVMPD) will no longer hold detainees for U.S. Immigration and Customs Enforcement (ICE) requests after joining the ICE program in 2008.

On January 13, 2015, Republican U.S. Senator Dean Heller praised Gillespie's work as Sheriff of Clark County.

Civic offices
Preceded by Bill Young	Sheriff of Clark County; January 2, 2007 – January 5, 2015	Succeeded by Joe Lombardo
