= Rory Reid (politician) =

American attorney and politician

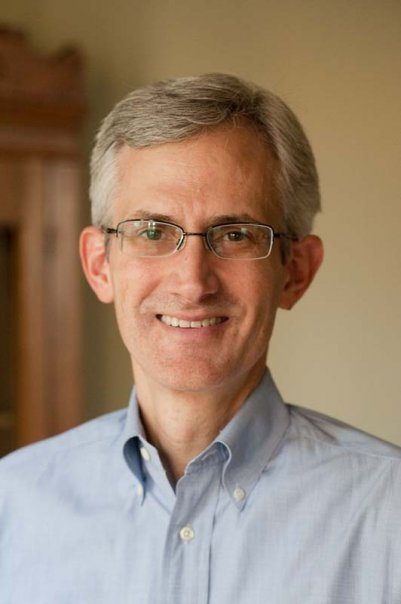

Chair of the Clark County Commission
- In office January 3, 2005 – January 3, 2011
- Preceded by: Chip Maxfield
- Succeeded by: Susan Brager

Member of the Clark County Commission from District G
- In office January 6, 2003 – January 3, 2011
- Preceded by: Dario Herrera
- Succeeded by: Mary Beth Scow

Personal details
- Born: Rory Jason Reid; July 11, 1963 (age 62) Alexandria, Virginia, U.S.
- Party: Democratic
- Spouse: Cindy Reid
- Children: 3
- Parents: Harry Reid (father); Landra Gould (mother)
- Education: Brigham Young University (BA, JD)

Rory Jason Reid (born July 11, 1963) is an American attorney and chief executive officer of the Rogers Foundation.

Reid was a founding partner of Reid Rubinstein Bogatz, a Nevada law firm focusing on government relations, business development, real estate and state and local permitting. In addition to his role at the Rogers Foundation, Reid has been active as both a business and civic leader in the community and on the boards of several civic organizations.

He served as elected Chair of the Clark County Commission in Clark County, Nevada, and was the Democratic nominee for Governor of Nevada in the 2010 gubernatorial election. Reid is a member of the Democratic Party and a son of the late former United States Senator Harry Reid.

== Biography ==
Reid was born on July 11, 1963, in Alexandria, Virginia, and raised in the Las Vegas area where he attended Ed W. Clark High School. He graduated from Brigham Young University (BYU) with a degree in international relations and Spanish, and then attended the university's J. Reuben Clark Law School, from which he graduated in 1987.

As a teenager, he worked as a sportswriter for the Las Vegas Sun and interviewed Muhammad Ali prior to the boxer's fight with Larry Holmes in 1980. Later, he served as a member of the Nevada Taxicab Authority. During the 1990s, he also served as senior vice-president and general counsel for Lady Luck Gaming.

He and his wife Cindy have three children and a grandchild.

== Clark County Commission ==
Reid was elected to the Clark County Commission in 2002. As chairman of the commission, he updated the master plans of the county to reduce non-conforming zone changes. Reid was reelected in 2006 with 62 percent of the vote against Matthew E. O'Neil. In 2008, Reid served as chairman of Hillary Clinton's presidential campaign for the state of Nevada and an adviser on Western issues.

== 2010 Nevada gubernatorial race ==
Reid kicked off his run for Governor of Nevada in Las Vegas on October 15, 2009, with a second event in Reno the following day as part of an effort to gain recognition in Northern Nevada.

Reid campaigned on diversifying Nevada's economy and promoting alternative energy, both in an effort to create jobs.

Reid has disagreed with his father, Harry Reid, on some issues, including by supporting Hillary Clinton in the 2008 Democratic caucuses when Harry backed Barack Obama. Clinton won the Nevada caucus. In October 2009, he had a differing opinion of a pair of proposals for rail projects in Nevada.

In June 2010, Reid dropped his last name from the heading of many campaign advertisements. His campaign literature then simply said, "Rory 2010."

Reid was defeated by Republican Brian Sandoval in the November 2, 2010, general election.

Party political offices
Preceded by Dina Titus	Democratic nominee for Governor of Nevada; 2010	Succeeded by Bob Goodman
