= Nevada Policy =

Public interest organization

- Focus: Nevada public policy
- President: John Tsarpalas
- Chair: Ranson Webster
- Budget: Revenue: $1.28million Expenses: $1.37 million (FYE December 2023)
- Formerly called: Nevada Policy Research Institute
- Website: npri.org

Nevada Policy, formerly the Nevada Policy Research Institute, is a private, non-profit, conservative and libertarian‑leaning think tank based in Las Vegas, Nevada.

The institute has conducted investigative research into Nevada government agencies, most notably exposing financial irregularities between the Las Vegas Convention and Visitors Authority and a private marketing firm. The organization's research on Nevada tax, fiscal, and education policy has been cited in prominent publications including the Las Vegas Review-Journal and the Wall Street Journal.

== Overview ==
Nevada Policy researches education, tax and fiscal policy, and labor issues related to public policy.

=== Funding ===
Contributors include the Donors Capital Fund and the Cato Institute.

=== LVCVA ===
On November 30, 2008, the Las Vegas Review Journal published an article regarding some investigative journalism conducted by Nevada Policy on the Las Vegas Convention and Visitors Authority. According to Nevada Policy's investigation, it appeared the LVCVA had an inappropriate relationship with a private marketing firm, R&R, that overbilled the LVCVA but the LVCVA never attempted to recoup the losses.

Through public records request Nevada Policy found that the LVCVA not only knew about these irregularities but literally gave R&R the rubber stamp to approve expenditures above $5,000 without any oversight from the LVCVA.

According to Nevada Policy's vice president, "In the days following the release of this project, multiple private investigators visited the institute's offices requesting our financial statements and claiming to be working for "the other side." Some of our board members have been approached with broad hints about retaliation if the institute's look into convention authority financing proceeds."

== Positions ==
=== Education ===
Nevada Policy opposes efforts to halt the opening of new charter schools and favors expanding charter school options, tuition tax credits, school voucher programs, and merit pay for teachers.

Nevada Policy has been critical of the Nevada System of Higher Education, specifically the University of Nevada, Las Vegas and the University of Nevada, Reno for low graduation rates, despite spending above average per full-time student on education and education related higher education expenditures.

=== Tax and fiscal policy ===
Nevada Policy supports a balanced budget with controlled growth in government spending, such as a TABOR's or TASC amendment. Nevada Policy claims Nevada's 2008-2009 budget deficit was the result of excessive growth in government spending.

Nevada Policy has also argued that Nevada's history as a low-tax state has been slowly eroded by a growing number of fees on Nevada's residents.

Nevada Policy opposes tax hikes on individual taxpayers and corporations within Nevada, including a tax hike on the gaming industry.

=== Regulations ===
A report from the institute found that Nevada is the second-most burdensome state for regulations, resulting in negative externalities on small businesses and lower income households. It also found that Nevada has 200 boards and commissions, 84% of which are categorized as “regulatory,” 14% as “advisory” and 3% as “task forces.” The report also found 35% of the 200 boards were established in the 21 century and the creation of these boards increases almost yearly.

=== Labor issues ===
Nevada Policy supports protecting secret ballot boxes and paycheck protection and opposes defined benefit plans for union and government workers.

== See also ==
- Classical liberalism
- Conservatism
- Libertarianism
- 2008 Nevada budget crisis
