= Bill Young (Nevada politician) =

American law enforcement officer

15th Sheriff of Clark County
- In office January 6, 2003 – January 2, 2007
- Preceded by: Jerry Keller
- Succeeded by: Doug Gillespie

Personal details
- Born: William David Young; 1956 (age 69–70) Yerington, Nevada, United States
- Party: Republican (1988–present)
- Education: Bishop Gorman High School; FBI National Academy; FBI National Executive Institute
- Alma mater: University of Louisville; University of Nevada, Las Vegas (B.S. and M.S.)

William David Young (born 1956) is an American retired law enforcement officer and the 15th Sheriff of Clark County from January 6, 2003, to January 2, 2007. He is a member of the Republican Party.

== History ==
On May 4, 2005, Young supported a tax increase in Clark County for new officers.

On March 14, 2007, Young was hired by Station Casinos.

On September 6, 2013, Young declined to run for a second term as Clark County Sheriff in 2014.

On August 16, 2016, Young and former Democratic Washoe County Sheriff Mike Haley endorsed Nevada Question 1 ballot.

Civic offices
Preceded by Jerry Keller	Sheriff of Clark County; January 6, 2003 – January 2, 2007	Succeeded by Doug Gillespie
