= Joe Lombardo =

Governor of Nevada since 2023

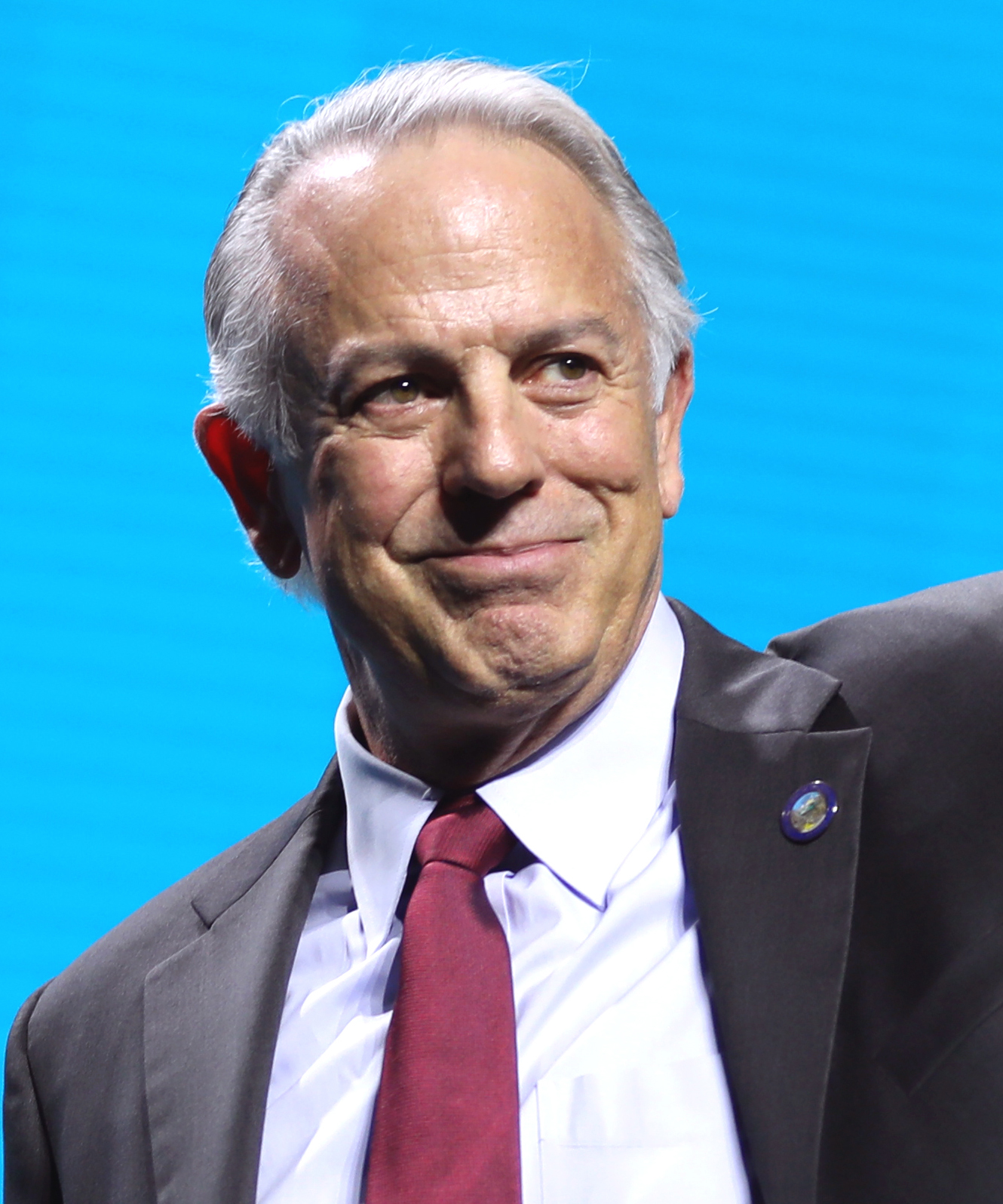
- Lombardo in 2024

31st Governor of Nevada
- Incumbent
- Assumed office January 2, 2023
- Lieutenant: Stavros Anthony
- Preceded by: Steve Sisolak

17th Sheriff of Clark County
- In office January 5, 2015 – January 2, 2023
- Preceded by: Doug Gillespie
- Succeeded by: Kevin McMahill

Personal details
- Born: Joseph Michael Lombardo; November 8, 1962 (age 64) Sapporo, Hokkaido, Japan
- Party: Republican
- Spouse: Donna Alderson (m. 2015)
- Children: 1
- Education: University of Nevada, Las Vegas (BS, MS)
- Website: Office website Campaign website

Military service
- Allegiance: United States
- Branch/service: United States Army
- Years of service: 1980–1986
- Unit: Nevada National Guard; United States Army Reserve
- Lombardo's voice Lombardo on the police response to the 2017 Las Vegas shooting. Recorded October 4, 2017

Joseph Michael Lombardo (/ləmˈbɑːrdoʊ/ ləm-BAR-doh; born November 8, 1962) is an American politician and former law enforcement officer serving since 2023 as the 31st governor of Nevada. From 2015 to 2023, he was the 17th sheriff of Clark County, capping a 34-year career in law enforcement. Lombardo is a member of the Republican Party.

Born in Japan, Lombardo moved to Las Vegas in 1976 and was educated at the University of Nevada, Las Vegas. He served in the United States Army before becoming an officer in the Las Vegas Metropolitan Police Department in 1988. He was elected sheriff of Clark County in 2014 and reelected in 2018. Lombardo was elected governor of Nevada in 2022, defeating incumbent Democratic governor Steve Sisolak. He ran for reelection in 2026, but lost to Democratic nominee Aaron Ford.

== Early life and education ==
The son of a United States Air Force veteran, Lombardo was born in Sapporo, Hokkaido, Japan, on November 8, 1962. He lived in Japan for over a decade before moving to Las Vegas in 1976. Lombardo graduated from Rancho High School in 1980. Lombardo graduated from the University of Nevada, Las Vegas with a Bachelor of Science in civil engineering and a Master of Science in crisis management. He also completed the 227th session of the FBI National Academy in 2006.

== Early career ==
=== Military service ===
After graduating from high school in 1980, Lombardo joined the United States Army. During his time in the Army, he served in the Nevada National Guard and in the United States Army Reserve. He ended his military service in 1986.

=== Law enforcement career ===
Lombardo joined the Las Vegas Metropolitan Police Department as an officer in 1988. He rose through the ranks, becoming a sergeant in 1996, a lieutenant in 2001, and a captain in 2006. He was promoted to assistant sheriff in 2011. As assistant sheriff, Lombardo was in charge of the law enforcement services group, which included the department's divisions in charge of technical services, information technology, radio systems and professional standards. Lombardo also sat on the LVMPD Foundation's board of directors from 2007 to 2014. He retired from the police force after 26 years and stepped down from the foundation's board of directors in 2014 after being elected sheriff. Lombardo made appearances on the TV show Cops between 1991 and 2020.

== Sheriff of Clark County ==
=== First term (2015–2019) ===
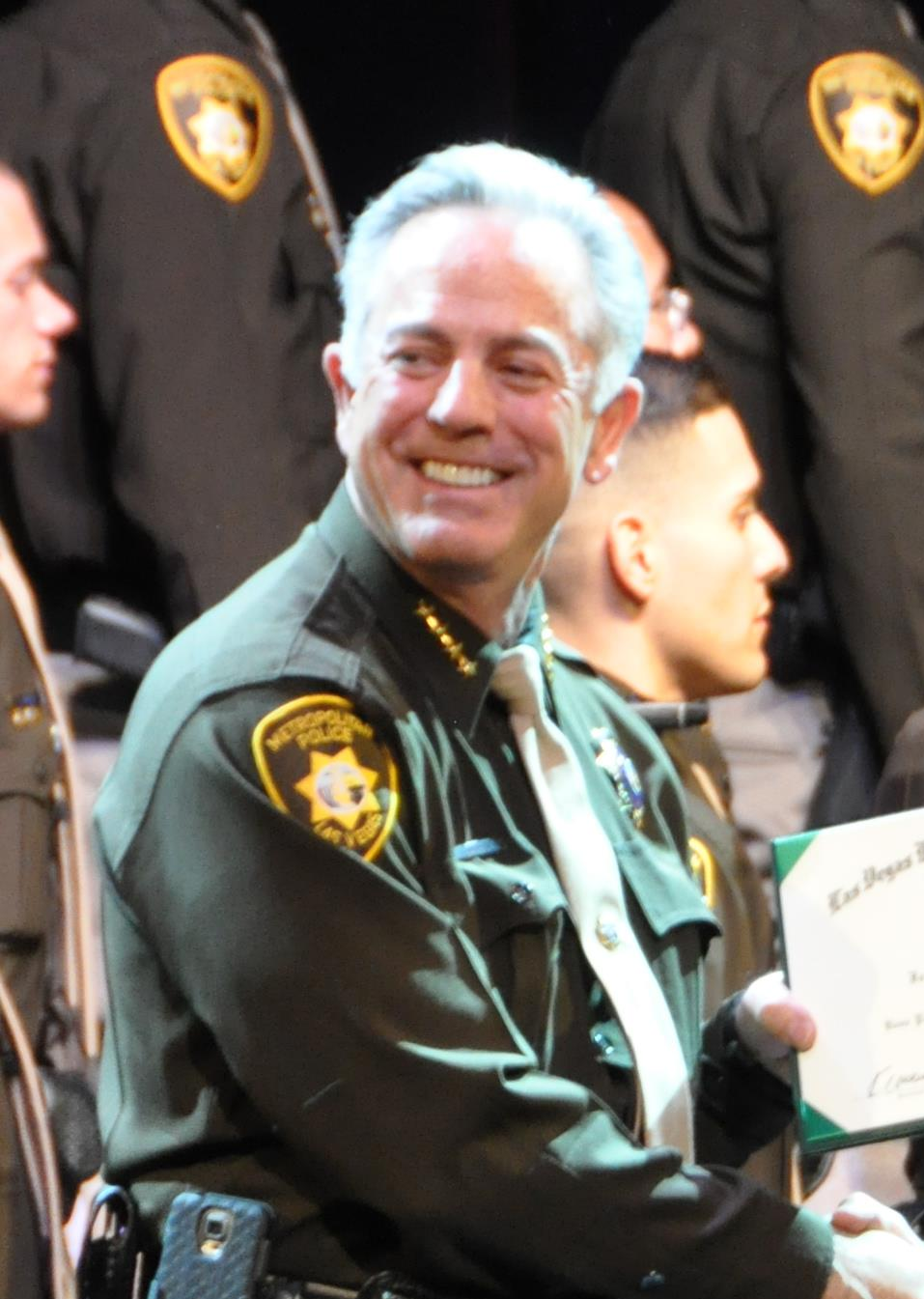
Lombardo as Clark County Sheriff in 2016

On December 4, 2013, Lombardo announced his candidacy for sheriff of Clark County to succeed the retiring Doug Gillespie. He won the primary election and narrowly defeated the Democratic nominee, retired LVMPD captain Larry Burns, in the general election. Lombardo took office on January 5, 2015. As sheriff he was head of the Las Vegas Metropolitan Police Department, the combined law enforcement agency of Las Vegas and Clark County and Nevada's largest law enforcement agency, overseeing more than 5,000 officers.

After becoming sheriff, Lombardo began the decentralization of LVMPD's detective operations, shifting detective operations from centralized crime-specific units to distribution of detectives throughout LVMPD area commands. In 2016, he connected the Las Vegas crime increase to a California's Proposition 47, which is meant to reduce prison overcrowding. Later that year, he responded to questions about a recent spike of violent crimes in Las Vegas, saying the surge "keeps me up at night". He later disagreed with FBI director James Comey when Comey attributed a recent spike in violent crime in Las Vegas to a so-called Ferguson effect. In December 2016, Lombardo supported a high-capacity magazine ban, which the Las Vegas Sun editorial board supported. By February 2017, Lombardo had concluded that homicides in Las Vegas had increased by an average of 20 annually.

Timeline of the Las Vegas shooting presented by Lombardo

In September 2017, after Seattle Seahawks defensive end Michael Bennett was arrested in Las Vegas, Lombardo dismissed Bennett's allegations that two police officers who arrested him used excessive force and made vulgar threats, saying video of the arrest did not corroborate the allegations. After the mass shooting at Mandalay Bay and the Route 91 Harvest music festival, in which 60 people died and 867 were injured—the deadliest mass shooting in modern U.S. history—Lombardo oversaw the investigation into the shooting and the perpetrator, Stephen Paddock.

=== Second term (2019–2023) ===
Lombardo won the 2018 primary election with 73% of the vote, defeating four challengers. He was sworn in to a second term on January 4, 2019, and during the ceremony touted an expansion of the LVMPD's staff levels during his tenure (an increase of more than 900 officers and 280 corrections officers). Later that year, Lombardo's department issued a report recommending many changes to improve the police response to future critical incidents.

In June 2020, amid the George Floyd protests, the LVMPD arrested six people observing a protest along the Las Vegas Strip. Governor Steve Sisolak called for an investigation. Lombardo defended the department's actions by releasing body-cam videos of the six engaging in "antagonizing behavior" and obstructing officers. In lieu of running for a third term, Lombardo ran for governor of Nevada in 2022. He was replaced by LVMPD undersheriff Kevin McMahill.

== Governor of Nevada ==
=== 2022 gubernatorial campaign ===
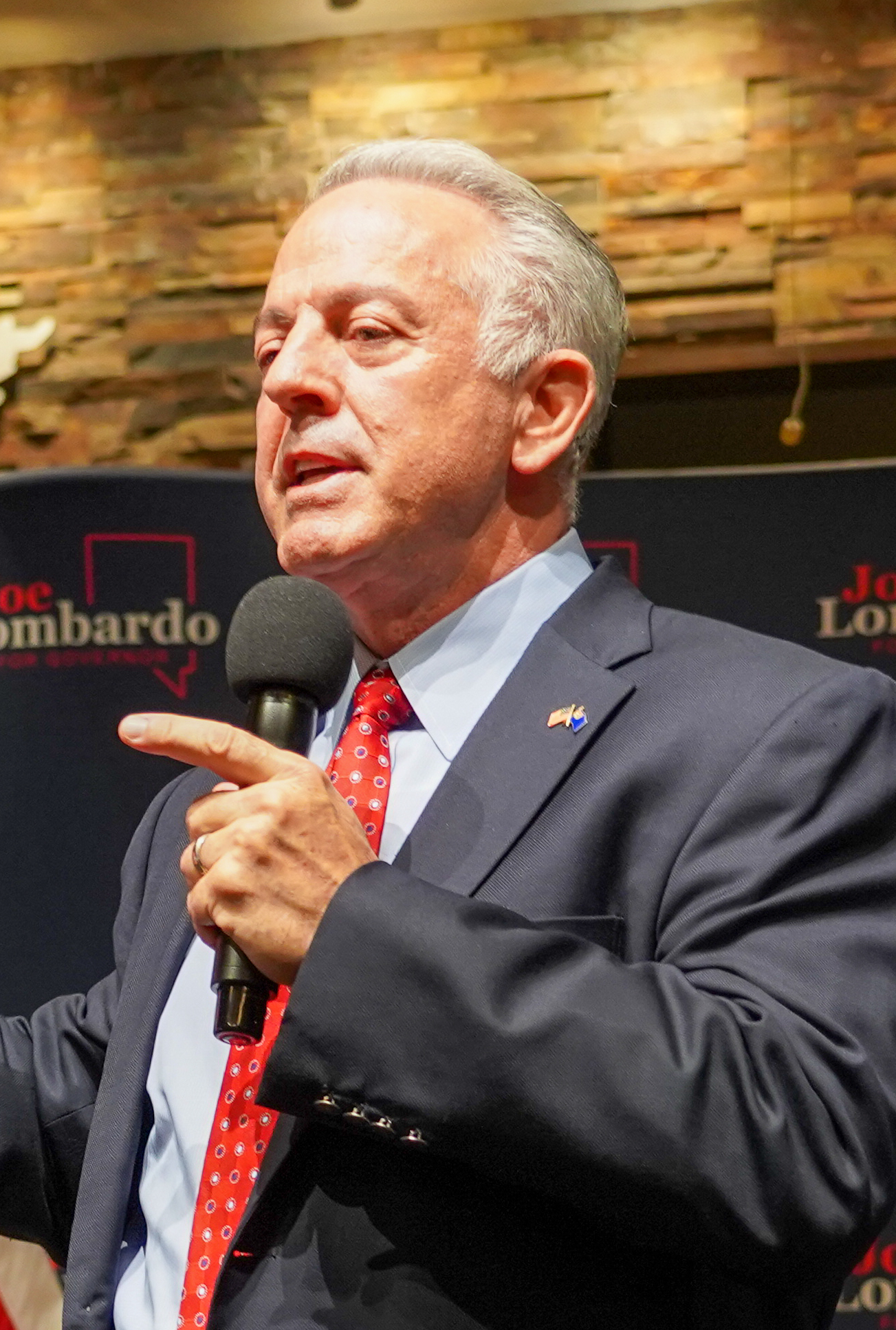
Lombardo campaigning for governor, September 2022

Lombardo announced his candidacy for governor of Nevada on June 28, 2021, to challenge incumbent governor Steve Sisolak in the 2022 election. Lombardo faced 11 other candidates, including the presumptive front-runner, Dean Heller, a former U.S. senator. Lombardo eventually surpassed Heller by double digits in the polls and was widely considered the front-runner by February. Former President Donald Trump endorsed Lombardo in April 2022. Lombardo won the Republican nomination on June 14, 2022, with 38.3% of the vote, defeating his main competitors, including Heller, Reno-based attorney and former boxer Joey Gilbert, and North Las Vegas Mayor John Jay Lee. On November 12, 2022, several days after election day, Lombardo was projected to win, having defeated Sisolak by 15,386 votes.

=== Tenure ===
Lombardo was sworn in on January 2, 2023, the same day Cisco Aguilar became Nevada Secretary of State and Andy Matthews became Nevada State Controller. On his fourth day in office, Lombardo signed two executive orders to remove remaining COVID-19 mandates and address workforce vacancies and wages. On January 12, Lombardo signed two more executive orders aimed at reducing regulatory burdens. The orders would suspend any new regulations from executive agencies, with exceptions for regulations that would affect public health, public safety, pending judicial deadlines and the essential duties of an executive branch.

In his State of the State address on January 23, Lombardo proposed a two-year $11 billion budget that would be the largest general fund budget in Nevada history and pledged $2 billion per biennium for K-12 education—an increase of more than 22% from the previous biennium. He also promised to restore funding to the state's higher education system and proposed adding $313 million into what he announced as the "Nevada Way Fund", a savings fund to be used for infrastructure and development projects. On March 1, Lombardo signed legislation to transfer $70 million from the state's general fund to the education fund.

In May, Lombardo proposed implementing a voter ID requirement to roll back vote-by-mail. State Democratic legislators have said the proposal would be "dead on arrival". In June, Lombardo introduced a bill to the Nevada State Legislature to help fund a $1.5 billion 30,000-seat ballpark built on the site of the Tropicana Las Vegas for the Oakland Athletics' relocation to Las Vegas via partial public financing. During a special session, the bill was amended and renamed SB1 on June 7. By June 15, he signed SB1 into law, which authorized the funding and construction of the ballpark after it passed in the Legislature by a majority vote. In June 2023, Lombardo signed a bill to provide $380 million in public funding for the stadium. Proponents of the public funding package argued that it would be good for Nevada's economy, while some economists argued that studies show these kinds of deals are bad investments for taxpayers.

In September 2023, the work vacancy rate in Nevada stood at 24.3%, virtually unchanged since Lombardo was sworn in as governor. In an attempt to lower the vacancy rate, Lombardo signed an executive order on September 18 that suspended certain minimum qualification requirements for state jobs for at least 90 days. In July 2025, a poll conducted for a Democratic-aligned group and reported by The Nevada Independent found that 51% of Nevada voters approved of Lombardo's job performance while 38% disapproved, with lower ratings among Latino voters and on economic issues.

== Political positions ==
Lombardo describes himself as a moderate Republican.

=== Criminal justice ===
In an April 2022 interview with The Nevada Independent, Lombardo said he supports the death penalty as long as there is due process. Lombardo also said he opposes the "defund the police" slogan.

=== Education ===
Lombardo supports an audit of the education system. In an April 2022 interview with The Nevada Independent, he said he would investigate whether education funds are being allocated appropriately on "day one" of his governorship.

=== Abortion ===
During his 2022 campaign, Lombardo described his personal views as "pro-life", but made clear he opposes a national abortion ban and supports upholding the codification of abortion rights passed by Nevada voters in 1990. On May 30, 2023, Lombardo signed into law a bill enshrining protections for out-of-state abortion seekers and in-state abortion providers. Lombardo was endorsed by National Right to Life, a Political Action Committee that opposes abortion rights, but, as of May 2023, he was one of three Republican governors, along with Phil Scott of Vermont and Charlie Baker of Massachusetts, to have signed legislation protecting access to abortion services.

=== Gun control ===
Lombardo supports universal background checks on people purchasing guns. As Clark County sheriff, he supported a high-capacity magazine ban, saying after the 2017 Las Vegas shooting: "I'm a very avid hunter. I was in the military myself. And there's no need to have a high-capacity magazine for any practical reason."

=== LGBTQ rights ===
Lombardo signed legislation that "prevents insurance companies from discriminating against trans people on the basis of gender identity, while the other measure signed in late May requires prisons to develop regulations to ensure safety of trans and nonbinary people who are incarcerated." He signed two pieces of legislation to protect transgender and non-binary rights in Nevada, but vetoed a third bill that would have strengthened protections for medical providers offering gender-affirming care to minors.

==== Sports ====
In October 2024, commenting on the San Jose State transgender volleyball controversy, Lombardo expressed his support on social media for the University of Nevada, Reno's women's volleyball team boycotting future games with San Jose State. Lombardo wrote, "As I've said previously, I believe there are competition and safety concerns with transgender women in sports, and it's irresponsible for the NCAA to put student athletes in a position of balancing their personal safety against the schools, competition, and sports that they love." Of the boycott, the team said, "We refuse to participate in any match that advances injustice against female athletes."

In September 2026, a ballot initiative Lombardo supported to restrict transgender participation in Nevada school sports was withdrawn from consideration for the November 2026 ballot. The initiative sought to require school sports programs to classify athletes as male, female, or coeducational and generally determine eligibility according to sex assigned at birth, which Democratic officials and LGBTQ rights advocates oppose. Lombardo cited "legal delays and uncertainty" that prevented the initiative from completing the qualification process. 150,000 signatures were needed to qualify the initiative; the number of signatures before the ballot's withdrawal was not reported. Lombardo said he would pursue the measure during the 2027 legislative session.

=== Voting ===
In an April 2022 interview with The Nevada Independent, Lombardo said he did not believe there was fraud in the 2020 presidential election and saw no reason to believe Joe Biden was not "duly elected", although he suggested that "the election system has the ability to have fraud in it".

=== Healthcare ===
Lombardo originally decried Nevada's public option, calling it "political theater", but more recently has accepted that it will be enacted. He has sought to alter the proposal by adding a market stabilization program to it.

== Personal life ==
Lombardo was divorced and has one child from his previous marriage. He married Donna Alderson, a commercial real estate broker, in 2015. Lombardo is Catholic. He is an off-road racer in the SCORE International racing series. On May 15, 2026, police pulled Lombardo over following a suspected red-light violation; he was issued a warning but no citation.

== Electoral history ==
2014 Clark County sheriff election
Primary election
Party	Candidate	Votes	%
Nonpartisan	Joe Lombardo	41,827	36.26
Nonpartisan	Larry Burns	32,620	28.28
Nonpartisan	Ted Moody	20,745	17.99
Nonpartisan	Robert Gronauer	7,302	6.33
General election
Nonpartisan	Joe Lombardo	154,047	51.16
Nonpartisan	Larry Burns	147,063	48.44
Total votes		301,110	100.0

2018 Clark County sheriff election
Party	Candidate	Votes	%
Nonpartisan	Joe Lombardo	139,132	72.81
Nonpartisan	Tim Bedwell	29,939	15.67
Nonpartisan	Matt Caldwell	10,241	5.36
Nonpartisan	Gordon Martines	8,570	4.48
Nonpartisan	Gregory Heiny	3,210	1.69

2022 Nevada Republican gubernatorial primary election
Party	Candidate	Votes	%
Republican	Joe Lombardo	87,761	38.40%
Republican	Joey Gilbert	61,738	27.01%
Republican	Dean Heller	32,087	14.04%
Republican	John Jay Lee	17,846	7.81%
Republican	Guy Nohra	8,348	3.65%
Republican	Fred J. Simon	6,856	3.00%
Republican	Thomas Heck	4,315	1.89%
None of These Candidates		4,219	1.85%
Republican	Eddie Hamilton	1,293	0.57%
Republican	Amber Whitley	1,238	0.54%
Republican	William Walls	833	0.36%
Republican	Gary Evertsen	558	0.24%
Republican	Seven Achilles Evans	475	0.21%
Republican	Edward O'Brien	422	0.18%
Republican	Barak Zilberberg	352	0.15%
Republican	Stanleigh Lusak	229	0.10%
Total votes		228,570	100.0%

2022 Nevada gubernatorial election
Party	Candidate	Votes	%	±%
Republican	Joe Lombardo	497,377	48.81%	+3.50%
Democratic	Steve Sisolak (incumbent)	481,991	47.30%	−2.09%
Libertarian	Brandon Davis	14,919	1.46%	+0.57%
None of These Candidates		14,866	1.46%	-0.48%
Independent American	Ed Bridges	9,918	0.97%	−0.07%
Total votes		1,019,071	100.0%	
Turnout		1,023,617	54.58%	
Registered electors		1,875,578		
Republican gain from Democratic				

2026 Nevada Republican gubernatorial primary election
Party	Candidate	Votes	%
Republican	Joe Lombardo (incumbent)	172,150	90.8
None of These Candidates		4,367	2.3
Republican	Irina Hansen	4,114	2.2
Republican	Matthew Winterhawk	3,452	1.8
Republican	Donald J. Beaudry Jr.	2,482	1.3
Republican	M. Kameron Hawkins	1,230	0.7
Republican	Jose M. Zalaya	1,095	0.6
Republican	Barak Zilberberg	744	0.4
Total votes		189,638	100.0

== See also ==
- List of United States governors born outside the United States

Civic offices
Preceded by Doug Gillespie	Sheriff of Clark County; 2015–2023	Succeeded by Kevin McMahill
Party political offices
Preceded by Adam Laxalt	Republican nominee for Governor of Nevada; 2022, 2026	Most recent
Political offices
Preceded by Steve Sisolak	Governor of Nevada; 2023–present	Incumbent
U.S. order of precedence (ceremonial)
Preceded by JD Vance as Vice President	Order of precedence of the United States; Within Nevada	Succeeded by Mayor of city in which event is held
Preceded by JD Vance as Vice President	Order of precedence of the United States; Within Nevada	Succeeded by Otherwise Mike Johnson as Speaker of the House
Preceded by Patrick Morrisey as Governor of West Virginia	Order of precedence of the United States; Outside Nevada	Succeeded by Jim Pillen as Governor of Nebraska
