= Nevada Governor's Mansion =

Historic house in Nevada, United States

- Governor's Mansion
- U.S. National Register of Historic Places
- Nevada Historical Marker
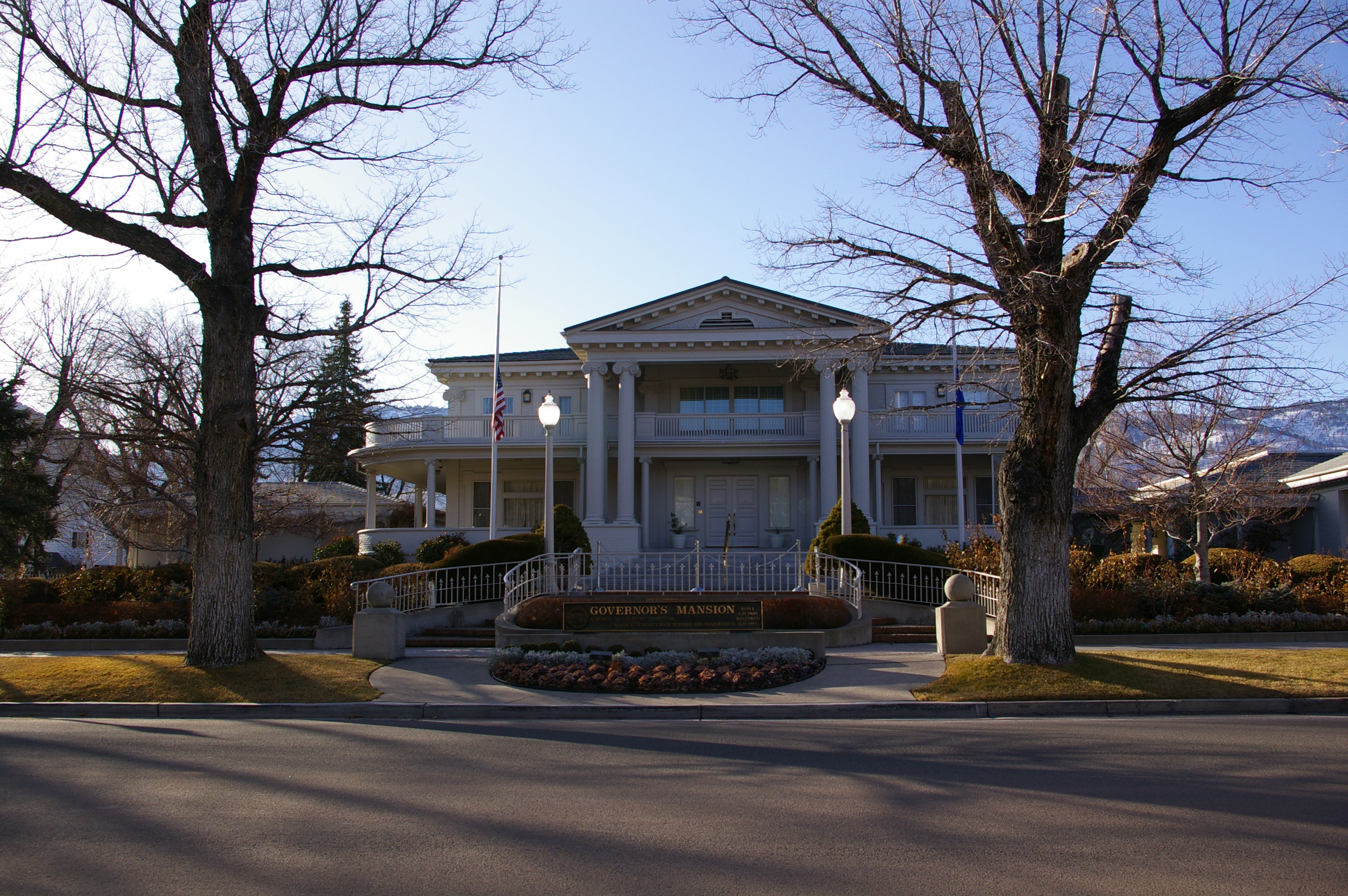
- The Governor's Mansion in Carson City
- Location: 606 Mountain St. Carson City, Nevada
- Coordinates: 39°10′03″N 119°46′23″W
- Area: 1.8 acres (0.73 ha)
- Built: 1909
- Architect: George A. Ferris
- Architectural style: Classical Revival
- NRHP reference No.: 76002242
- No.: 259
- Added to NRHP: October 22, 1976

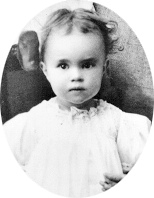
June Dickerson is the only child born in the mansion.

The Nevada Governor's Mansion is the official residence of the governor of Nevada and his family. Reno architect George A. Ferris designed this Classical Revival (Neoclassical) style mansion. It is listed on the U.S. National Register of Historic Places.

== History ==
The Governor's Mansion of the State of Nevada was built between 1908 and 1909. Until that time, Nevada's governors and their families found lodging where they could in or near Carson City, the capital. State Assembly Bill 10, the "Mansion Bill," was passed in 1907 to secure a permanent site and residence for a Governor's Mansion. Mrs. T.B. Rickey sold the land where the mansion now stands to the State of Nevada for $10, and George A. Ferris, a Reno architect, designed the mansion with Classical Revival features and Georgian and Jeffersonian motifs, and a construction bid was awarded for $22,700. Acting Governor Denver S. Dickerson and his family were the first residents when they occupied the mansion in July 1909. The building was first opened to the public during an open house on New Year's Day, 1910. The governor's daughter, June Dickerson, was born in the mansion on September 2, 1909, and is the only child yet born in the mansion.

The mansion was at the center of a legal dispute resulting from the divorce case of Governor Jim Gibbons and his now-former wife Dawn. Several months before filing a divorce petition in May 2008, the Governor moved out of the mansion, returning to the couple's private residence in Reno. Upon filing for divorce, he filed a petition seeking his wife's eviction from the mansion, citing state law which requires that the Governor maintain his or her home and office in the state capital. Mrs. Gibbons challenged that petition, citing a desire to continue fulfilling her duties as First Lady and instead offering to live in the mansion's guest house, which would allow her husband to live separately in the main house. Furthermore, her attorney also cited state law which allows divorcing couples to divide equally anything of value enjoyed by both parties until the divorce is finalized. After their divorce, Governor Gibbons moved back into the mansion, and Dawn Gibbons relocated to an apartment in Las Vegas.
