= Sheriff of Clark County =

Law enforcement officer in Nevada, US

- Incumbent; Kevin McMahill since January 2, 2023
- Style: The Honorable
- Residence: Clark County, Nevada, U.S.
- Term length: Four years, no term limits.
- Inaugural holder: Charles Corkhill; 1909
- Formation: Lincoln County and Nevada Legislature
- Salary: $194,310.67 (2019)
- Website: Office of the Sheriff

The Sheriff of Clark County, officially The Sheriff of the County of Clark, is the chief law enforcement officer of Clark County, Nevada. The Sheriff heads the Las Vegas Metropolitan Police Department, is elected by the citizens of Clark County, and is an independent agency with joint policing of the City of Las Vegas and of unincorporated Clark County. The sheriff is the only elected head law enforcement officer within the city and county, and, as such, is not under the direct control of the city, county, state, or federal government.

The current sheriff is Kevin McMahill, who became sheriff after Republican Joe Lombardo resigned to become Governor of Nevada.

== History ==
The Las Vegas Metropolitan Police Department was formed on July 1, 1973, by merging the former Las Vegas Police Department with the Clark County Sheriff's Department, with the Sheriff serving as its chief. The result is that Metro polices within the city limits of Las Vegas and all unincorporated areas and towns within Clark County.

== Staff ==
Metro has more than 5,100 members. Of these, over 2,700 are police officers of various ranks and over 750 are corrections officers of various ranks.

== List of Clark County Sheriffs ==
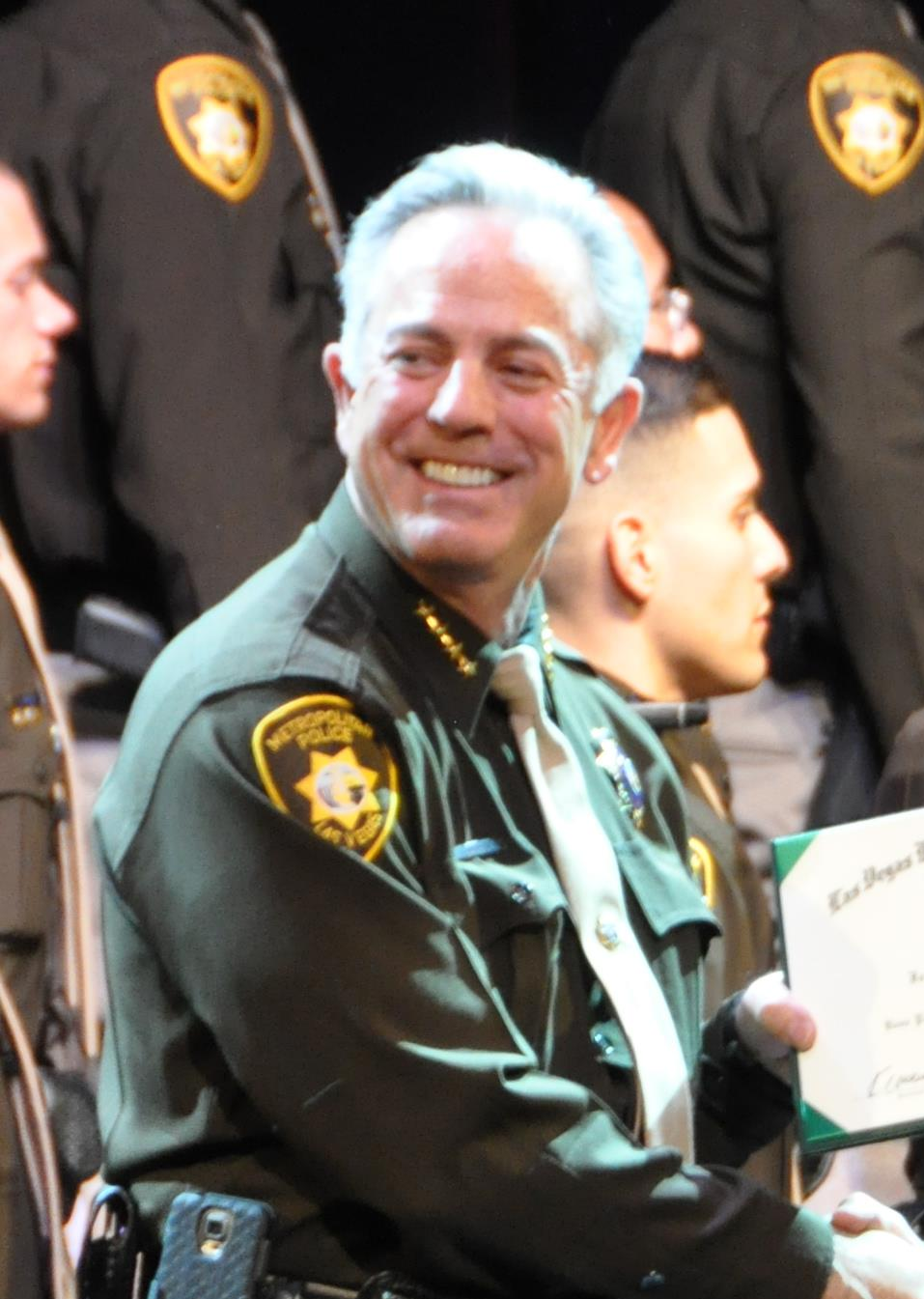
Joe Lombardo, the current governor of Nevada, served as the 17th Clark County sheriff from 2015 to 2023.

- Charles Corkhill, 1909–1911
- Sam Gay, 1911–1917
- Will Mundy, 1917 (acting)
- Jay Warren Woodard, 1917 (acting)
- Sam Gay, 1917–1931
- Joe Keate, 1931–1936
- Bill Mott, 1936–1937
- Gene Ward, 1937–1943
- Glen Jones, 1943–1955
- Butch Leypoldt, 1955–1961
- Ralph Lamb, 1961–1979 (CCSO)
- John McCarthy, 1979–1983
- John Moran, 1983–1995 (LVPD)
- Jerry Keller, 1995–2003 (CCSO)
- Bill Young, 2003–2007
- Doug Gillespie, 2007–2015
- Joe Lombardo, 2015–2023
- Kevin McMahill, 2023–present
