= 2010 United States Senate election in Nevada =

- November 2, 2010
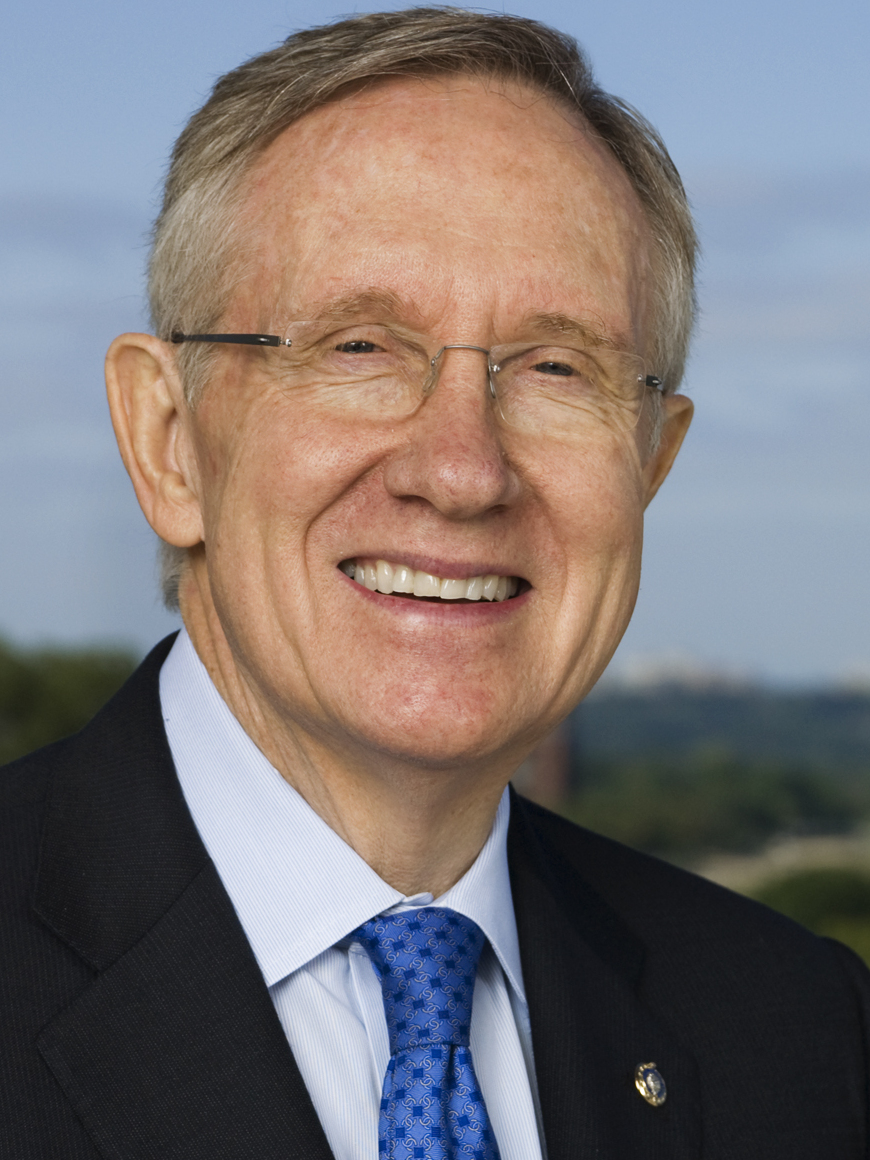

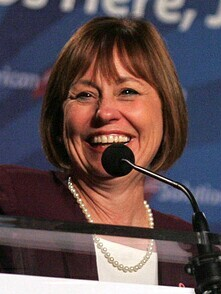
Nominee	Harry Reid	Sharron Angle
Party	Democratic	Republican
Popular vote	362,785	321,361
Percentage	50.29%	44.55%
- Reid: 40–50% 50–60% 60–70% Angle: 40–50% 50–60% 60–70%
U.S. senator before election
Harry Reid
Democratic
Elected U.S. Senator
Harry Reid
Democratic

The 2010 United States Senate election in Nevada took place on November 2, 2010. Incumbent Democratic U.S. Senator and Majority Leader Harry Reid won re-election to a fifth and final term, defeating Republican challenger Sharron Angle.

In its analysis of Reid's victory over Angle, Politico reported that the Reid campaign had placed advertisements opposing Angle's main primary opponent, Sue Lowden. The purpose of the ads was to enhance the "polarizing" Angle's chances of winning the Republican nomination.

Despite Angle leading by three points in the polls the days leading up to the election, Reid won by 5.74%, even defeating Angle in her own county, Washoe County. Reid also secured huge numbers out of the Democratic stronghold of Clark County, which covers the Las Vegas Metropolitan Area. Angle ran for this seat again in 2016 and lost the Republican primary.

== Democratic primary ==
The Democratic primary took place on June 8, 2010. Reid won by a large margin over a field of political unknowns.

=== Candidates ===
==== Nominee ====
- Harry Reid, incumbent U.S. Senator

==== Defeated in primary ====
- Alex Miller
- Eduardo Hamilton
- Carlo Poliak, trash collector and perennial candidate

==== Declined ====
- Barbara Buckley, Speaker of the Nevada Assembly

=== Polling ===
Poll source	Dates administered	Harry Reid	Barbara Buckley
Mellman Group (D)	June 17–29, 2008	51%	20%

=== Results ===
By county: Reid: 30–40%; 40–50%; 50–60%; 60–70%; 70–80%; Miller: 30–40%

Democratic primary results
Party	Candidate	Votes	%
Democratic	Harry Reid (incumbent)	87,401	75.3
None of These Candidates		12,341	10.6
Democratic	Alex Miller	9,717	8.4
Democratic	Eduardo Hamilton	4,645	4.0
Democratic	Carlo Poliak	1,938	1.7
Total votes		116,042	100.0

== Republican primary ==
The Republican primary also took place on Tuesday, June 8, 2010.

=== Candidates ===
==== Nominee ====
- Sharron Angle, former state assembly member and candidate for the 2nd district in 2006

==== Defeated in primary ====
- John Chachas, businessman
- Chad Christensen, state assemblyman
- Greg Dagani, former member of the Nevada Board of Education
- Chuck Flume, businessman
- Sue Lowden, former state senator
- Mark Noonan, Navy veteran
- Bill Parson, Marine veteran and businessman
- Danny Tarkanian, real estate owner

==== Withdrawn ====
- Mark Amodei, state senator
- Chuck Kozak, attorney dropped out of race
- Robin L. Titus, physician dropped out of race
- Mike Wiley, conservative activist dropped out of race

==== Declined ====
- Dean Heller, incumbent U.S. Representative
- Brian Krolicki, Lieutenant Governor of Nevada
- Jon Porter, former U.S. Representative

=== Endorsements ===
Sharron Angle

State officials

- Sarah Palin

Organizations

- Can-Do Conservatives of America (disabled advocacy group)
- Change the Congress in 2010 PAC
- Citizens United Political Victory Fund
- Club for Growth
- Declaration Alliance PAC
- Government is not God PAC
- Gun Owners of America Political Victory Fund
- Life & Liberty PAC
- Minuteman PAC (Chris Simcox)
- Nevada Concerned Citizens
- Nevada Homeschool Network
- Nevada Republican Assembly
- Republican Liberty Caucus
- Tea Party Express
- Veterans in Politics
- Western Representation PAC

Individuals

- Pat Boone
- Leon Catlett, Las Vegas talk show host
- Mark Levin
- Joe the Plumber
- Phyllis Schlafly, Eagle Forum
Sue Lowden

U.S. Senators

- Jon Kyl, Senate Minority Whip
- Fred Thompson, former U.S. Senator

State officials

- Robert List, former Governor of Nevada

Organizations

- Susan B. Anthony List, pro-life organization
- University of Nevada, Las Vegas College Republicans

Individuals

- Jeri Thompson, political commentator
Danny Tarkanian

State officials

- George Deukmejian, former governor of California

Organizations

- Armenian National Committee Political Action Committee
- Armenian Council of America Political Action Committee

Individuals

- Jim Gilchrist, co-founder of the Minuteman Project
- Kim Rhode, two-time Olympic gold medal winner

=== Debates ===
- Nevada Primary Senate Candidates Debate, C-SPAN, May 18, 2010

=== Polling ===
Dates administered	Poll source	Tarkanian	Lowden	Angle
August 21, 2009	Mason Dixon/LVRJ	33%	14%	5%
October 8, 2009	Poll	21%	23%	9%
December 2009	Mason Dixon/LVRJ	24%	25%	13%
January 7, 2010		28%	26%	13%
February 24, 2010	Mason Dixon/LVRJ	29%	47%	8%
April 11, 2010	Mason Dixon/LVRJ	27%	45%	5%
April 26–28, 2010	Research 2000	28%	38%	13%
May 13, 2010	Mason Dixon/LVRJ	22%	30%	25%
May 28, 2010	Mason Dixon/LVRJ	23%	30%	29%
May 31 – June 2, 2010	Research 2000	24%	25%	34%
June 2, 2010	Suffolk University	26%	24%	33%
June 1–3, 2010		24%	23%	32%

=== Results ===
Results by county: Angle: 30–40%; 40–50%; Lowden: 30–40%; Tarkanian: 30–40%

Republican primary results
Party	Candidate	Votes	%
Republican	Sharron Angle	70,452	40.1
Republican	Sue Lowden	45,890	26.1
Republican	Danny Tarkanian	40,936	23.3
Republican	John Chachas	6,926	3.9
Republican	Chad Christensen	4,806	2.7
None of These Candidates		3,091	1.8
Republican	Bill Parson	1,484	0.8
Republican	Gary Bernstein	698	0.4
Republican	Garn Mabey	462	0.3
Republican	Cecilia Stern	355	0.2
Republican	Brian Nadell	235	0.1
Republican	Terry Suominen	224	0.1
Republican	Gary Marinch	179	0.1
Total votes		175,738	100.0

== General election ==
=== Candidates ===
- Harry Reid (D), incumbent U.S. Senator and Senate Majority Leader
- Sharron Angle (R), former member of the Nevada Assembly
- Scott Ashjian (Tea Party) (campaign site, PVS)
- Tim Fasano (Independent American) (campaign site, PVS)
- Michael Haines (Independent) (campaign site, PVS)
- Jesse Holland (Independent) (campaign site, PVS)
- Jeffrey Reeves (Independent) (campaign site, PVS)
- Wil Stand (Independent) (PVS)

=== Campaign ===
In January 2009, the GOP began running an advertisement attacking President Barack Obama's proposed stimulus plan and Reid for his support of the legislation. Since becoming Minority Leader (in 2004), his approval ratings had dropped below 50%. A November 2007 poll showed Reid's approval rating at 39%, with 49% of voters disapproving.

After the primaries, the first poll showed Angle leading by a double-digit margin. CQ Politics changed their analysis of the race from leaning Republican to a toss-up because of Angle's sharply conservative views and tendency to commit verbal gaffes; however, CQ added that if the voters treat the election as a referendum on Reid, then Angle will likely win.

In 2009, Reid had been endorsed by some prominent Nevada Republicans. Immediately after the primary, the Republican mayor of Reno, Bob Cashell, who had backed Lowden in the Republican primary, endorsed Reid for the general election, calling Angle an "ultra-right winger." Other Republicans expressed doubt about supporting Angle, citing her reputation for ideological rigidity from her years in the state legislature.

One of the first general election ads attacked Angle for her stance on Social Security and Medicare. In response, Angle explained that "the government must continue to keep its contract with seniors, who entered into the system on good faith and now are depending on that contract." In response to accusations that she was not mainstream enough for Nevada voters, Angle explained on a KXNT radio show that she was "more mainstream than the fellow that said tourists stink, this war is lost, and light-skinned no-Negro dialect", in reference to comments that had been made by Senator Reid.

In September, Tibi Ellis, the chairwoman of the Nevada Republican Hispanic Caucus, who had been a spokesperson for Angle, criticized an Angle ad related to immigration. Ellis said, "I condemned this type of propaganda, no matter who is running them, where they blame Mexicans as the only problem and where they attack them as the only source of illegal immigration."

On October 7, 2010, Republican State Senator and Minority Leader William Raggio endorsed Reid. Dema Guinn, the widow of the late Republican Nevada Governor Kenny Guinn, endorsed Reid on October 8.

=== Endorsements ===
Harry Reid (D)

Newspapers

- Las Vegas Sun
- Reno Gazette-Journal
Sharron Angle (R)

State officials

- Sarah Palin

Organizations

- Citizens United Political Victory Fund
- Club for Growth
- Gun Owners of America Political Victory Fund
- Republican Liberty Caucus
- Tea Party Express

Newspapers

- Las Vegas Review-Journal

Individuals

- Pat Boone
- Mark Levin
- Joe the Plumber
- Phyllis Schlafly, Eagle Forum

=== Debate ===
Angle and Reid only agreed to one debate, in which no other candidate would participate. It was held on October 14. Junior Senator John Ensign played Reid during one day of debate preparation at the Trump Plaza in Las Vegas for Angle.

=== Polling ===
==== Graphical summary ====
View source data.

Poll source	Date(s) administered	Sample size (Note: Key: A – all adults RV – registered voters LV – likely voters V – unclear)	Margin of error	Harry Reid (D)	Sharron Angle (R)	Others	Undecided
Rasmussen Reports	December 9, 2009	500 (LV)	±4.5%	43%	47%	7%	3%
Mason-Dixon (Las Vegas Review-Journal)	January 5–7, 2010	625 (RV)	±4.0%	40%	45%	–	15%
Rasmussen Reports	January 11, 2010	500 (LV)	±4.5%	40%	44%	10%	7%
Rasmussen Reports	February 3, 2010	500 (LV)	±4.5%	40%	44%	7%	8%
Rasmussen Reports	March 3, 2010	500 (LV)	±4.5%	38%	46%	11%	5%
Rasmussen Reports	March 31, 2010	500 (LV)	±4.5%	40%	51%	6%	3%
Rasmussen Reports	April 27, 2010	500 (LV)	±4.5%	40%	48%	7%	4%
Research 2000 (Daily Kos)	April 26–28, 2010	600 (LV)	±4.0%	41%	44%	9%	6%
Mason-Dixon (Las Vegas Review-Journal)	May 24–26, 2010	625 (RV)	±4.0%	42%	39%	9%	10%
Research 2000 (Daily Kos)	May 31 – June 2, 2010	600 (LV)	±4.0%	42%	37%	10%	8%
Mason-Dixon (Las Vegas Review-Journal)	June 1–3, 2010	625 (RV)	±4.0%	41%	44%	7%	8%
Rasmussen Reports	June 9, 2010	500 (LV)	±4.5%	39%	50%	5%	6%
Rasmussen Reports	June 22, 2010	500 (LV)	±4.5%	41%	48%	8%	2%
Rasmussen Reports	July 12, 2010	750 (LV)	±4.0%	43%	46%	6%	5%
Mason-Dixon (Las Vegas Review-Journal)	July 12–14, 2010	625 (RV)	±4.0%	44%	37%	9%	10%
Public Policy Polling	July 16–18, 2010	630 (RV)	±3.9%	48%	46%	–	6%
Rasmussen Reports	July 27, 2010	750 (LV)	±4.0%	45%	43%	7%	4%
Mason-Dixon (Las Vegas Review-Journal)	July 28–30, 2010	625 (RV)	±4.0%	43%	42%	9%	6%
Ipsos (Reuters)	July 30–August 1, 2010	462 (LV)	±4.6%	48%	44%	2%	7%
Mason-Dixon (Las Vegas Review-Journal)	August 9–11, 2010	625 (RV)	±4.0%	46%	44%	5%	5%
Rasmussen Reports	August 16, 2010	750 (LV)	±4.0%	47%	47%	5%	2%
Mason-Dixon (Las Vegas Review-Journal)	August 23–25, 2010	625 (LV)	±4.0%	45%	44%	6%	5%
Rasmussen Reports	September 1, 2010	750 (LV)	±4.0%	45%	45%	5%	6%
Mason-Dixon (Las Vegas Review-Journal)	September 7–9, 2010	625 (LV)	±4.0%	46%	44%	4%	6%
Pulse Opinion Research, (Fox News)	September 11, 2010	1,000 (LV)	±3.0%	44%	45%	8%	2%
Rasmussen Reports	September 13, 2010	750 (LV)	±4.0%	48%	48%	2%	3%
Opinion Research (CNN/Time)	September 10–14, 2010	789 (LV)	±3.5%	41%	42%	16%	1%
Pulse Opinion Research, (Fox News)	September 18, 2010	1,000 (LV)	±3.0%	45%	46%	5%	4%
Mason-Dixon (Las Vegas Review-Journal)	September 20–22, 2010	625 (LV)	±4.0%	43%	43%	6%	8%
Public Opinion Strategies (Las Vegas Sun)	September 21–23, 2010	500 (LV)	±4.4%	45%	40%	8%	7%
Rasmussen Reports	September 28, 2010	750 (LV)	±4.0%	48%	47%	4%	1%
Pulse Opinion Research, (Fox News)	October 2, 2010	1,000 (LV)	±3.0%	46%	49%	5%	0%
Magellan Strategies	October 4, 2010	1,408 (V)	±2.6%	43%	48%	5%	4%
Rasmussen Reports	October 5, 2010	750 (LV)	±4.0%	46%	50%	2%	2%
Public Policy Polling	October 7–9, 2010	504 (LV)	±4.4%	47%	45%	7%	1%
Pulse Opinion Research, (Fox News)	October 9, 2010	1,000 (LV)	±3.0%	47%	49%	4%	0%
Rasmussen Reports	October 11, 2010	750 (LV)	±4.0%	48%	49%	1%	2%
Mason-Dixon (Las Vegas Review-Journal)	October 11–12, 2010	625 (LV)	±4.0%	45%	47%	4%	4%
Rasmussen Reports	October 17, 2010	750 (LV)	±4.0%	47%	50%	2%	1%
Rasmussen Reports	October 25, 2010	750 (LV)	±4.0%	45%	49%	4%	2%
Opinion Research (CNN/Time)	October 20–26, 2010	773 (LV)	±3.5%	45%	49%	5%	1%
Mason-Dixon (Las Vegas Review-Journal)	October 25–27, 2010	625 (LV)	±4.0%	45%	49%	3%	3%
Pulse Opinion Research, (Fox News)	October 30, 2010	1,000 (LV)	±3.0%	45%	48%	7%	0%
Public Policy Polling	October 30–31, 2010	682 (LV)	±3.8%	46%	47%	6%	1%

=== Fundraising ===
Candidate (party)	Receipts	Disbursements	Cash on hand	Debt
Sharron Angle (R)	$27,797,915	$27,505,917	$291,999	$635,737
Harry Reid (D)	$19,185,317	$22,325,360	$176,309	$419,093
Source: Federal Election Commission

=== Predictions ===
Reid was initially considered vulnerable, with the non-partisan Cook Political Report rating the election as a tossup and the Rothenberg Political Report rating the state as tossup. A June 9, 2010, Rasmussen Reports post-primary poll showed Angle leading incumbent Senator Harry Reid by a margin of 50% to 39%. However, a July 2010 poll showed Senator Reid leading Angle by 7 points, following nationwide attention to some of Angle's positions, as well as the endorsement of Reid by prominent Republicans. The change of margin, 18% in less than a month, is the largest in Senate elections history. On July 28, 2010, Rasmussen Reports moved the race from tossup to leans Democratic. Later, it moved back to tossup. Polls generally had Angle up, and thus Reid seemed like the underdog. Journalist Jon Ralston correctly predicted Reid would win based on early voting numbers and Reid running a strong campaign.

Source	Ranking	As of
Cook Political Report	Tossup	October 26, 2010
Rothenberg	Tossup	October 22, 2010
Sabato's Crystal Ball	Lean R (flip)	October 28, 2010
RealClearPolitics	Tossup	October 26, 2010
CQ Politics	Tossup	October 26, 2010
New York Times	Tossup	November 1, 2010
FiveThirtyEight	Likely R (flip)	November 1, 2010

=== Results ===
United States Senate election in Nevada, 2010
Party	Candidate	Votes	%	±%
Democratic	Harry Reid (incumbent)	362,785	50.29	–10.84
Republican	Sharron Angle	321,361	44.55	+9.45
None of These Candidates		16,174	2.25	+0.6
Tea Party of Nevada	Scott Ashjian	5,811	0.81	N/a
Independent	Michael L. Haines	4,261	0.59	N/a
Independent American	Timothy Fasano	3,185	0.44	N/a
Independent	Jesse Holland	3,175	0.44	N/a
Independent	Jeffery C. Reeves	2,510	0.35	N/a
Independent	Wil Stand	2,119	0.29	N/a
Total votes		721,381	100.0	
Democratic hold				

==== By county ====
County	Reid	%	Angle	%	Others	%
Carson City	8,714	44.64%	9,362	47.96%	1,443	7.39%
Churchill	2,473	27.80%	5,639	63.40%	783	8.80%
Clark	253,617	54.41%	192,516	41.30%	20,030	4.30%
Douglas	7,530	34.57%	12,858	59.04%	1,392	6.39%
Elko	3,246	25.24%	8,173	63.56%	1,440	11.20%
Esmeralda	80	20.15%	268	67.51%	49	12.34%
Eureka	137	18.05%	524	69.04%	98	12.91%
Humboldt	1,600	32.12%	2,836	56.92%	546	10.96%
Lander	487	25.60%	1,201	63.14%	214	11.25%
Lincoln	442	22.68%	1,311	67.27%	196	10.06%
Lyon	5,659	32.39%	10,473	59.95%	1,339	7.66%
Mineral	855	44.93%	822	43.19%	226	11.88%
Nye	5,279	36.66%	7,822	54.32%	1,298	9.01%
Pershing	597	34.39%	915	52.71%	224	12.90%
Storey	843	39.50%	1,124	52.67%	167	7.83%
Washoe	70,523	49.91%	63,316	44.81%	7,448	5.27%
White Pine	703	21.51%	2,201	67.33%	365	11.17%

Counties that flipped from Democratic to Republican

- Carson City
- Humboldt (largest municipality: Winnemucca)
- Nye (largest municipality: Pahrump)
- Pershing (largest municipality: Lovelock)
- Storey (largest municipality: Virginia City)
- White Pine (largest municipality: Ely)

== Notes ==
Official campaign websites

Official campaign sites

- Scott Ashjian for U.S. Senate
- John Chachas for U.S. Senate
- Chad Christensen for U.S. Senate
- Jim Duensing for U.S. Senate
- Tim Fasano for U.S. Senate
- Chuck Flume for U.S. Senate
- Michael Haines for U.S. Senate
- Jesse Holland for U.S. Senate Archived October 8, 2010, at the Wayback Machine
- Sue Lowden for U.S. Senate
- Alex Miller for U.S. Senate
- Jeffrey C. Reeves for U.S. Senate Archived July 31, 2010, at the Wayback Machine
- Harry Reid for U.S. Senate incumbent
- Danny Tarkanian for U.S. Senate
