= Tea Party of Nevada =

- Founder: Scott Ashjian
- Founded: January 27, 2010
- Dissolved: November 2, 2010
- Ideology: Tea Party Conservatism; Fiscal conservatism Popular constitutionalism Right-wing populism Libertarianism

The Tea Party of Nevada was a minor political party in Nevada. It fielded Scott Ashjian in the United States Senate election in Nevada, 2010.

== 2010 Election ==
The Tea Party of Nevada qualified as a minor political party with the Nevada Secretary of State on January 27, 2010. Ashjian's supporters created the party by filing more than the 250 signatures needed. The Tea Party of Nevada's stated goals include striving to "promote this nation's founding principles of freedom, liberty and a small representative government." The party stated in its preamble that both major political parties were responsible for a "massive national debt" in the United States, and that the "great conservative majority in America" should not believe that the Democrats and Republicans would support their views.

Ashjian filed his candidacy on March 2, 2010, and became the candidate of the Tea Party of Nevada for United States Senate in the 2010 Nevada general election. Ashjian's candidacy was the only one which appears as the "Tea Party" on the November 2010 ballot. In April 2010, Ashjian faced a legal challenge which attempted to remove his name from the ballot. Carson City, Nevada district judge James Todd Russell heard arguments on whether Ashjian could remain on the ballot starting on April 14. Judge Russell ultimately ruled that Ashjian complied with the intent of the law and he could remain on the ballot. The American Independent Party, which brought the suit against Ashjian, filed an appeal of the case to the Nevada Supreme Court. On October 6, 2010, the Nevada Supreme Court issued a unanimous ruling that Ashjian's candidacy would remain on the November 2010 ballot.

Ashjian did not fare well in the election, garnering less than 1% of the vote (0.81%). However, his candidacy likely split or demoralized the Republican voting bloc as Sharron Angle, who was polled as the likely winner in nine of the ten polls before the election, was upset by incumbent Democrat Harry Reid. A key contributor to the failure of the party in the 2010 election was the Tea Party Express endorsing Angle over Ashjian in a failed effort to prevent this splitting of the ballot.

The party was a single issue party for Ashjian's candidacy. Following his defeat the party has ceased to exist, and there have been no efforts to revive it. However, there was never an official declaration of the party dissolving.

== Election results ==
2010 United States Senate elections
Party	Candidate	Votes	%	±%
Democratic	Harry Reid (Incumbent)	362,785	50.29%	−10.84%
Republican	Sharron Angle	321,361	44.55%	+9.45%
None of These Candidates		16,174	2.25%	+0.65%
Tea Party	Scott Ashjian	5,811	0.81%	N/A
Independent	Michael L. Haines	4,261	0.59%	N/A
Independent American	Timothy Fasano	3,185	0.44%	N/A
Independent	Jesse Holland	3,175	0.44%	N/A
Independent	Jeffery C. Reeves	2,510	0.35%	N/A
Independent	Wil Stand	2,119	0.29%	N/A
Majority		41,424	5.74%	
Total votes		721,381	100.00%	−11.14%
Democratic hold				
