= Sharron Angle =

American politician (born 1949)

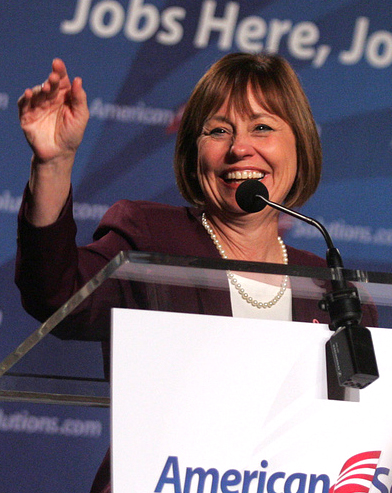

Member of the Nevada Assembly
- In office January 3, 1999 – January 3, 2007
- Preceded by: Ernie Adler
- Succeeded by: Ty Cobb
- Constituency: 29th district (1999–2003); 26th district (2003–2007)

Personal details
- Born: Sharon Elaine Ott; July 26, 1949 (age 77) Klamath Falls, Oregon, U.S.
- Party: Republican (before 1992, 1997–present)
- Other political affiliations: Independent American (1992–1997)
- Spouse: Theodore Angle (m. 1970)
- Children: 2
- Education: University of Nevada, Reno (BFA)

Sharron Elaine Angle (née Ott; born July 26, 1949) is an American politician who served as a Republican member of the Nevada Assembly from 1999 to 2007. She ran unsuccessfully as the 2010 Republican nominee for the U.S. Senate seat in Nevada, garnering 44.6 percent of the vote. On September 15, 2013, she was unanimously elected the fifth President of the National Federation of Republican Assemblies, and resigned in 2016 to run again for the Nevada U.S. Senator position being vacated by Harry Reid but failed to win the Republican primary. In 2018, she ran in the Republican primary for Nevada's 2nd congressional district and lost to the incumbent, Mark Amodei.

== Political career ==
=== Nevada Assembly ===
In 1992, Angle was elected to the Nye County School Board of Trustees and served one term. Before this time, she was registered as a Republican. During this term, she was an active member of the Independent American Party of Nevada. She re-registered as a Republican in 1997 after deciding to run for elected office. In 1998, she won election to the Nevada State Assembly and served until 2006. During her time in the 42-member assembly, she voted "no" so frequently on matters of wide consensus that votes were often called as "41-to-Angle".

In 2003, she hired John C. Eastman of the Claremont Institute to fight the Supreme Court decision when then Governor Kenny Guinn sued the Legislature to nullify the state constitution and allow a simple majority of the legislature to pass an $836 million tax increase in Angle v. Guinn. Angle used her personal funds to defend the state constitution's two-thirds vote requirement to raise taxes and, with Eastman, took the case to Federal District Court in Nevada, which referred it to the Ninth Circuit Court of Appeals and finally to the U.S. Supreme Court. The Legislature subsequently passed the $836 million tax increase by a two-thirds vote. Angle ultimately prevailed in the suit; in 2006, the state supreme court reversed its 2003 decision and restored the Nevada Constitution's two-thirds vote provision.

In 2003, Angle attempted to arrange a trip to an Ensenada, Baja California prison to assess a drug treatment program implemented there. She also arranged to visit a prison in New Mexico to assess the "Second Chance Program", which licensed its materials from Criminon, a program for rehabilitating prisoners using methods developed by Scientology founder L. Ron Hubbard. Angle sponsored legislation aimed at placing this program in certain women's prisons in Nevada.

In 2005, she was the sole voter against a bill that split the property tax abatement by applying a 3% rate to residential and 8% rate to commercial property. She stated that she voted no because the Nevada Constitution states that taxation must be uniform and equal and so could not vote against her oath of office to which she swore to "uphold and defend the Constitution."

=== 2006 run for U.S. Congress ===
On August 15, 2006, Angle narrowly lost the primary for U.S. Congress in Nevada's 2nd congressional district which was vacated by Rep. Jim Gibbons. Nevada Secretary of State Dean Heller received 24,781 votes to Angle's 24,353. Gibbons' wife Dawn, a former State Assemblywoman herself, finished with 17,328 votes. On August 25, Angle called for a new primary election on the grounds that some poll workers showed up late for work, or didn't show up at all, in Washoe County, where she was the strongest. On September 1, the Carson City District Judge denied her appeal for a new election.

=== 2008 run for Nevada State Senate ===
Angle ran for a seat in the Nevada Senate by challenging incumbent William Raggio in the Republican primary. Angle lost, 53–47%.

=== 2010 run for U.S. Senate ===
On April 15, 2010, Angle received an endorsement for the U.S. Senate race from the Tea Party Express. The next day, she received an endorsement from conservative talk radio personality Mark Levin. Angle was endorsed by several other conservative individuals and organizations, including the Club for Growth, Sarah Palin, Samuel "Joe the Plumber" Wurzelbacher, singer Pat Boone, and Phyllis Schlafly. Angle ultimately won the June 8, 2010, primary, capturing 40.09% of the vote, and beating Sue Lowden (26.11%), Danny Tarkanian (23.29%), and John Chachas (3.94%).

A June 9, 2010, Rasmussen Reports post-primary poll showed her leading incumbent Senator Harry Reid by a margin of 50% to 39%. A July 2010 poll showed Reid leading Angle by seven points. The change of margin, 18% in less than a month, is the largest in Senate elections history.

Some prominent Republicans opposed her candidacy. Immediately after the primary, the Republican mayor of Reno, Bob Cashell, who backed Lowden in the Republican primary, endorsed Reid for the general election, calling Angle an "ultra-right winger". Other notable Republicans supporting Harry Reid included Sig Rogich, a former campaign staffer for Ronald Reagan and assistant to President George H. W. Bush; Geno Martini, the Republican mayor of Sparks; Republican State Senator and Minority Leader William Raggio; Dema Guinn, the widow of Kenny Guinn, Republican Governor of Nevada; and former Lieutenant Governor Sue Wagner.

On October 3, Nevada's largest newspaper, the Las Vegas Review-Journal endorsed her bid for U.S. Senate against Reid. That same month, Nevada Tea Party candidate Scott Ashjian released a tape to the media of a recorded conversation he had with Angle where she asked him to drop out of the race. In the tape, Angle speaks candidly about her campaign and says that she cannot defeat Reid with Ashjian on the ballot.

One of Angle's campaign ads aired on television late in her campaign entitled "The Wave" was cited as racist and despicable by Sen. Robert Menendez.

On election day, Reid defeated Angle by 41,424 votes.

In its analysis of Reid's victory over Angle, Politico reported that the Reid campaign had placed advertisements opposing Angle's main primary opponent, Sue Lowden. The purpose of the ads was to enhance the "polarizing" Angle's chances of winning the Republican nomination.

==== Avoidance of the press and disputes with them ====
Angle was criticized during the campaign for largely avoiding answering questions from the press, both local and national. In September, the Las Vegas Review-Journal sued her for copyright infringement after she allegedly posted entire articles from the publication on her campaign website without permission. After the campaign ended, it was revealed that the campaign developed a code word to alert office workers if the media entered campaign headquarters: "It's time to water the plants."

==== Scientology issue ====
During the primary campaign, Lowden took out a political ad criticizing Angle's alleged associations with Scientology and claiming Angle "pushed a bill favored by the Church of Scientology." Although the Las Vegas Review-Journal said that "no bill was ever introduced," the Las Vegas Sun noted that Angle's website credited her with a successful bill against psychotropic drugs in schools, a position also supported by Scientologists, and that she had accompanied celebrity Scientologists Jenna Elfman and Kelly Preston to promote the bill in the U.S. Senate. Angle herself promoted a similar bill in the Nevada Assembly but was not successful.

During a KVBC-hosted debate on Face to Face with Jon Ralston, Angle was asked about "recent whispers" that her legislative proposal to establish the Scientology-linked Second Chance Program in Nevada prisons was a "strange foray into Scientology", a reference to her 2003 proposal to study the program implemented in Mexico and New Mexico. Angle responded, "This program had a recidivism rate of less than 10 percent. They aren't massages. … it was more of a karate chop. The sauna was a sweat box. When you're in there with 30 guys, it's not exactly a sauna."

Angle has repeatedly denied "the rumor that she's a Scientologist", stating that the controversy had been "largely distorted". Regarding these claims relating to Scientology, Angle told the Las Vegas Review-Journal, "The way to ruin a conservative is to pass them off as part of the radical fringe. They always try to marginalize me."

==== Dearborn, Michigan controversy ====
In September 2010, Angle told a group of Tea Party supporters that "Sharia law" had taken over the cities of Dearborn, Michigan, and "Frankford, Texas", and that these locations represented a "militant terrorist situation." Dearborn mayor John O'Reilly criticized Angle, saying, "There's no sharia law in Dearborn, Mich. … It isn't even talked about in Dearborn," that Angle's claims were dishonest, and that "Muslims have been practicing their faith in our community for almost 90 years without incident or conflict. To suggest that they have taken over ignores the fact that Dearborn hosts seven mosques and 60 Christian churches." Jim Mitchell, in an online editorial for the Dallas Morning News, clarified that "Frankford" was a town that had been included in Dallas in 1975, and didn't exist otherwise.

=== Canada–US border controversy ===
The Canadian ambassador to the U.S. Gary Doer has asked Angle to retract her assertion that the hijackers in the September 11 attacks entered the United States through Canada. Angle claims that the Canada–United States border is the "most porous border we have" and "what we know is our northern border is where the terrorists came through." U.S. law enforcement determined that the hijackers entered the U.S. directly from third countries with visas issued by the U.S.

=== Patriot Caucus ===
On December 12, 2010, Angle announced the formation of a PAC named the Patriot Caucus to "organize a ground game across most battleground states for the 2012 election cycle". According to Politico, Angle "[dropped] it in February ahead of a decision to run for the Republican nomination for a Nevada House seat."

=== 2012 elections ===
On January 26, 2011, while attending a screening of The Genesis Code in Iowa, a reporter asked Angle if she was considering a run for the White House. "I'll just say I have lots of options for the future, and I'm investigating all my options," was her reply. By February 10, she had decided against a run. On March 16, she announced that she would run for the House seat then held by Dean Heller, who at the time was running for the Senate seat held by retiring John Ensign in 2012, a seat which he was later appointed and subsequently elected. A year later, Angle announced she would not be running for any office in 2012.

=== National Federation of Republican Assemblies ===
Angle became a member of the Nevada chapter of the National Federation of Republican Assemblies (NFRA) in 2006, and in 2007, while she was still polling third in a three-way race, received the endorsements of both the state and national organizations for her United States Senate run. After her general election defeat, Angle became President of the Nevada Republican Assembly, and in 2011, Pacific Region Vice President of the national organization. In September 2013, Angle was unanimously elected NFRA President at the group's national convention in Dallas, Texas.

=== 2016 run for U.S. Senate ===
Angle again ran for the U.S. Senate in 2016 when Harry Reid retired. Angle finished a distant second in the Republican primary to winner Joe Heck, who garnered 64.9 percent of the vote to Angle's 22.8 percent.

=== 2018 congressional campaign ===
In March 2017, Angle announced that she would be running in the 2018 United States House of Representatives elections in Nevada in Nevada's 2nd congressional district, seeking to unseat incumbent Republican congressman Mark Amodei. The Associated Press called her platform on her campaign website "far-right". Angle came second in the primary with 18% of the vote to Amodei's 72%.

=== 2024 run for Nevada State Senate ===
Angle ran for State Senate in the 15th district. Angle came in second in the primary with 42% of the vote to Mike Ginsburg’s 51%.

=== 2026 run for Secretary of State of Nevada ===
Angle ran in the Republican primary for Secretary of State of Nevada in the 2026 election. She lost to Jim Marchant.

== Political positions ==
=== Education ===
Angle believes that the U.S. Department of Education should be eliminated and that the local approach yields the best academic results ("[The] best education is the education that is controlled closest to the local level as possible.") Angle also holds that the Department of Education is "unconstitutional" and should not be involved in dictating educational standards from Washington, D.C.

=== United Nations ===
Angle believes that the U.S. should withdraw from the United Nations, saying it is a bastion of liberal ideology and "the umpire on fraudulent science such as global warming."

=== Social policy ===
Angle supports the Federal Marriage Amendment to define marriage as between one man and one woman. She believes that households in which only one spouse works outside the home is the best way to raise a family. Angle opposes abortion, including in cases of rape or incest. In a June 2010 radio interview, broadcast statewide in Nevada, Angle stated that she had counseled young girls in "very at risk, difficult pregnancies" to consider other alternatives, by which they had been able to make "a lemon situation into lemonade."

=== Separation of church and state ===
Angle does not believe that the United States Constitution mandates the separation of church and state.

=== Health care/abortion ===
Angle favors the privatization of Medicare. She voted against fluoridating drinking water.

Angle opposes abortion, even in cases of rape and incest, saying that it is against God's "plan". On several occasions, she has introduced legislation which would have required doctors to tell women that abortion is linked to an increased risk of breast cancer, a faulty hypothesis promoted by anti-abortion activists but dismissed by the medical community.

During the 2010 campaign, Angle told the Las Vegas Review-Journal that, as a state legislator, she had sponsored a bill to remove the requirement that health insurers cover mammograms and colonoscopies. In a debate among the Republican candidates, she repeated her support for lifting "mandates" on insurance companies.

=== Social Security ===
Angle has said that the Social Security system should be "transitioned out". In May 2010, the Las Vegas Review-Journal reported that Angle had claimed in a radio interview on KNPR that "[her] grandfather wouldn't even take his Social Security check because he said he was not up for welfare." The following month the Reid campaign reacted with a television ad stating that "Sharron Angle would end Medicare and Social Security. This is crazy." Angle has spoken favorably of the program in Chile, where current beneficiaries of the public retirement system were allowed to continue but all others were compelled to pay into a private system instead.

=== Financial reform ===
Angle favors a comprehensive audit of the Federal Reserve, eliminating the complete Internal Revenue Service code and abolishing Freddie Mac and Fannie Mae.

=== Drugs ===
Angle has stated that she opposes legalizing marijuana and has stated that she feels the same about alcohol. When her spokesman, Jerry Stacy, was asked to clarify Angle's statement he responded that she doesn't want to bring back Prohibition, saying "Sharron doesn't want to make alcohol illegal," and noting that she has never introduced legislation along those lines, and even voted against taxes on alcohol. "Alcohol is a legal substance, and adults can choose to imbibe," Stacy said.

=== Global warming ===
Angle does not accept man-made global warming. "I'm a clean-air proponent," she stated. "I don't, however, buy into the whole man-caused global warming, man-caused climate change mantra of the left. I believe that there's not sound science to back that up."

=== Energy policy ===
As a long-term policy, Angle believes America must expand its own domestic energy supplies. She would legislate to repeal regulations that prohibit offshore drilling, drilling in the Arctic National Wildlife Refuge and development of American-owned petroleum resources. In the Nevada State Legislature, she led efforts to reduce Nevada's high gas tax, which was the second highest in the nation. She would also have supported the three coal-fired plants in Ely.

After President Obama secured agreement by BP to commit $20 billion to compensate victims of the Deepwater Horizon oil spill, Angle denounced the arrangement, calling it a "slush fund". When she was criticized for her comment, however, she retracted the term "slush fund" and said that BP should pay for the consequences of the spill.

=== Second Amendment ===
Sharron Angle has cited the Second Amendment to reassert the right to keep and bear arms on several occasions. Angle has said, "What is a little bit disconcerting and concerning is the inability for sporting goods stores to keep ammunition in stock … That tells me the nation is arming. What are they arming for if it isn't that they are so distrustful of their government? They're afraid they'll have to fight for their liberty in more Second Amendment kinds of ways?" and "That's why I look at this as almost an imperative. If we don't win at the ballot box, what will be the next step?" On Bill Manders' radio show, she stated that the Second Amendment is "to defend ourselves. And you know, I'm hoping that we're not getting to Second Amendment remedies. I hope the vote will be the cure for the Harry Reid problems." On Lars Larson's radio show, she stated "You know, our Founding Fathers, they put that Second Amendment in there for a good reason and that was for the people to protect themselves against a tyrannical government. In fact Thomas Jefferson said it's good for a country to have a revolution every 20 years. I hope that's not where we're going, but, you know, if this Congress keeps going the way it is, people are really looking toward those Second Amendment remedies and saying, 'My goodness, what can we do to turn this country around?' I'll tell you the first thing we need to do is take Harry Reid out."

Asked to comment on the latter, her spokesman Jerry Stacy said via email: "Sharron Angle does not advocate a revolution. Her goal is to go to Washington with other like-minded elected officials who understand the proper role of the federal government as already defined by our Constitution."

Congressman Jim Clyburn said in January 2011 that "Sharron Angle's endorsement of 'Second Amendment remedies' in her losing Nevada campaign against Senate Majority Leader Harry Reid contributed to the shooting of Rep. Gabby Giffords." Columnist E.J. Dionne did not blame Angle, but he did point out the connection between her call for "Second Amendment remedies" and the 2011 Tucson shooting. CBS News, in a "nationwide telephone poll" of 673 adults, with a margin of error of 4%, found that "57 percent of respondents said the harsh political tone had nothing to do with the shooting, compared to 32 percent who felt it did."

== Personal life ==
Angle was born in Klamath Falls, Oregon, and moved to Reno, Nevada, when she was three. Her father is a Navy veteran of World War II and served in the Navy Reserve during the Korean War. She attended public schools in Reno and later obtained a bachelor of fine arts from the University of Nevada. During her senior year of college in 1970, she married Theodore ("Ted") Angle, who worked for the federal government's Bureau of Land Management (BLM) as a native seed and invasive species specialist. Ted and Sharron Angle had two children and, as of November 2010, ten grandchildren.

Angle attends a small Southern Baptist church in Reno. After graduation, she worked as a substitute teacher in Ely, Tonopah and Reno for 25 years, ran a family fitness gym in Tonopah, tutored juvenile offenders for Nye County, and for two years was the lead-teacher/administrator for a small "one-room" Christian school. She also taught art for five years as a lecturer at Western Nevada Community College in Winnemucca.

Angle is the author of Right Angle: One Woman's Journey to Reclaim the Constitution, which was published in 2011.

Party political offices
Preceded by Richard Ziser	Republican nominee for U.S. Senator from Nevada (Class 3); 2010	Succeeded by Joe Heck
