= Latinos for Reform =

Latinos for Reform (LFR) is a conservative political action committee founded by Robert de Posada in 2008. LFR garnered national media attention when it attempted to air a 60-second advertisement on Spanish television station Univision that encouraged Democratic Hispanics not to vote.

== Robert de Posada ==
Robert de Posada, the group's founder, has a long history working with the Republican Party, serving with Dick Armey as co-director of "Americans for Border and Economic Security", on the Social Security Commission under former President George W. Bush, and as the Director of Hispanic Affairs of the Republican National Committee. De Posada has stated that he believes race relations between Latinos and African Americans have been strained in a "traditional" manner with President Obama. He believes that it would have been best for Latinos to stay home during the 2010 midterm elections in Nevada because Sharron Angle, the Republican candidate, had a "bordering-on-racist position on immigration".

== Criticism ==
Many have noticed that suppressing the Latino vote is, in reality, about suppressing much of the Democratic vote. Several mainstream Republicans have repudiated de Posada's advertisements.
