= Senator Adler =

Senator Adler may refer to:

- Charles Adler (broadcaster) (born 1954), Senate of Canada
- Ernie Adler (born 1950), Nevada State Senate
- John Adler (1959–2011), New Jersey State Senate

== See also ==
- Robert Adley (American politician) (born 1947), Louisiana State Senate
