= Scott Ashjian =

American politician

- Born: Jon Scott Ashjian; 1963 (age 62–63); Fresno, California, U.S.
- Occupations: Owner, asphalt company Real estate investor
- Political party: Tea Party of Nevada
- Movement: Tea Party movement
- Spouse: Bonnie
- Children: 3
- Website: Scott Ashjian for the U.S. Senate

Jon Scott Ashjian (born 1964), commonly known as Scott Ashjian, was the candidate of the Tea Party of Nevada in the race for United States Senate in the 2010 Nevada general election. Ashjian was born in Fresno, California; the oldest of eight children. After graduating from South Lake Tahoe High School in 1982, he started his own auto detailing company in Bakersfield, California, and grew it to include locations in Fresno, Bakersfield, and Visalia, California. He is a Mormon, and served on a mission in Argentina from 1986 to 1988. Ashjian moved from California to Nevada in 1995. He resides in Las Vegas, Nevada, where he works as a businessman, paving contractor, and real estate investor, and is owner of an asphalt company. With his wife, Bonnie, he has two sons and one daughter.

Ashjian was a member of the Republican Party, and voted for the presidential candidacies of Ronald Reagan, George W. Bush and John McCain. In 2010, Ashjian and his supporters created the Tea Party of Nevada, whose values espouse small government, freedom, liberty, and decreasing the United States public debt. Ashjian filed his candidacy papers for the Tea Party, a registered minor party in Nevada, at Carson City on March 2, 2010. Ashjian's U.S. Senate candidacy was challenged in court in April 2010, and Carson City, Nevada district judge James Todd Russell ruled that he could stay on the ballot. This decision was appealed, and the Nevada Supreme Court ruled in a unanimous decision on October 6, 2010, that Ashjian would remain on the November 2010 ballot for U.S. Senate.

In media interviews, Ashjian emphasized his values included decreased power of government, and a strict interpretation of the United States Constitution. He identified with the views of politicians including Ronald Reagan, Sarah Palin, and Ron Paul. His political campaign was run as a grass-roots movement, and he served as his own communications director. He explained his decision to manage a minimalist and inexpensive campaign came from a desire to avoid a disconnect between politics and the people he wished to represent. Ashjian asserted he was confident his campaign would beat opponents from the two major political parties, Democrat Harry Reid and Republican Sharron Angle. In October 2010, Ashjian released an audio-tape to the media of a recorded conversation with Angle, in which she asked him to drop out of the U.S. Senate race. Angle told him she did not believe she could beat U.S. Senate Majority Leader Harry Reid, if Ashjian remained on the ballot. Ashjian said he would stay in the race, and criticized both the major parties as inadequate choices in the election that would further the status quo. Harry Reid won the 2010 race and was reelected to the U.S. Senate.

== Early life and family ==
Scott Ashjian was born in Fresno, California in 1964; the oldest of eight children. His grandfather, John M. Ashjian, worked in law enforcement and was appointed by the Board of County Supervisors of Bakersfield, California as Chief Probation Officer. Ashjian graduated from South Lake Tahoe High School in 1982, where he was a wrestler. As a teenager, Ashjian gained experience managing businesses. Ashjian started an auto detailing company in Bakersfield, California in 1982. He grew this business to include facilities in Fresno, Bakersfield and Visalia, California. Ashjian is a Mormon. He served a mission in Argentina from 1986 to 1988. After completing his mission in Argentina, Ashjian returned to California and married his wife, Bonnie. Ashjian moved from California to Nevada in 1995. Ashjian and his wife have two sons and a daughter. His son Brogan served in 2010 on a religious mission in Calgary, Alberta, Canada. Ashjian's daughter Bostyn participates in dance competition; his son Bronson wrestles in his high school. In 2010, Ashjian resided in Las Vegas, where he worked as a businessman and paving contractor. Ashjian is a real estate investor, and is the owner of an asphalt company, A&A Asphalt. He is involved with California based agricultural ventures.

== Political career ==
Prior to his political aspirations for the U.S. Senate, Ashjian was a member of the Republican Party, and voted for the presidential candidacies of Ronald Reagan, George W. Bush and John McCain. Ashjian filed his candidacy on March 2, 2010, and became the candidate of the Tea Party of Nevada for United States Senate in the 2010 Nevada general election. Early polling the week Ashjian filed his candidacy, showed him drawing double-digit support. Ashjian's candidacy is the only one which appears as the "Tea Party" on the November 2010 ballot. It is his first entrance into an election for political office. The Tea Party of Nevada qualified as a minor political party with the Nevada Secretary of State on January 27, 2010. Ashjian's supporters created the party, by successfully filing more than the 250 signatures needed. The Tea Party of Nevada's stated goals include striving to "promote this nation's founding principles of freedom, liberty and a small representative government." The party stated in its preamble that both major political parties were responsible for a "massive national debt" in the United States, and that the "great conservative majority in America" should not believe that the Democrats and Republicans would support their views.

In April 2010, Ashjian faced a legal challenge which attempted to remove his name from the ballot, as he had been a registered Republican shortly before he submitted his candidacy. Carson City, Nevada district judge James Todd Russell heard arguments on whether Ashjian could remain on the ballot starting on April 14. Judge Russell ultimately ruled that Ashjian complied with the intent of the law and he could remain on the ballot. The American Independent Party, which brought the suit against Ashjian, filed an appeal of the case to the Nevada Supreme Court. Ashjian commented on attempts to remove him from the ballot, "They are doing the bidding for the Republican Party. They should welcome the ability of minor parties to field candidates when the two major political parties have failed us so badly." On October 6, 2010, the Nevada Supreme Court issued a unanimous ruling that Ashjian's candidacy would remain on the November 2010 ballot.

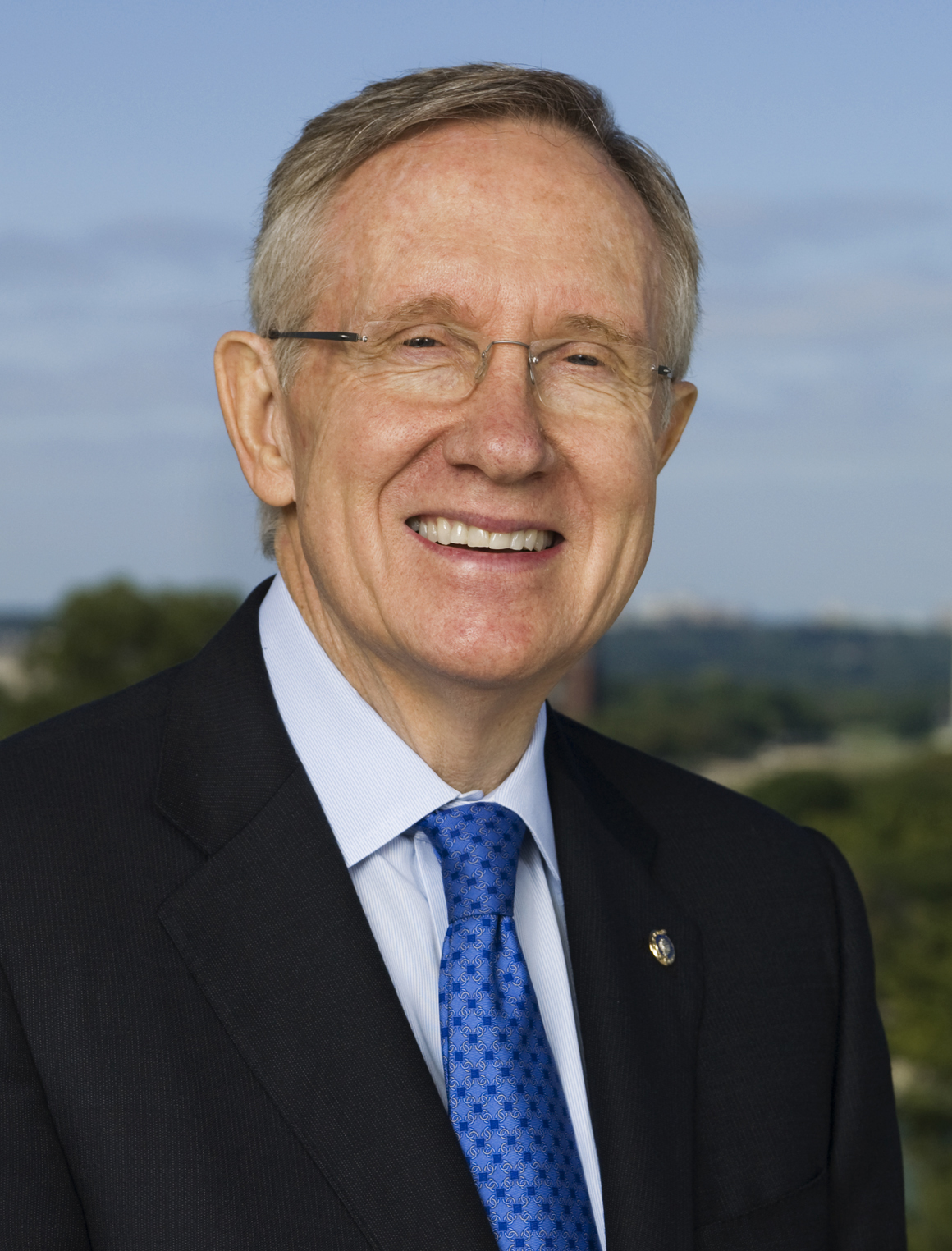
Harry Reid (Democrat)

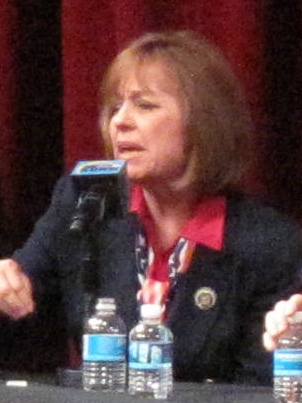
Sharron Angle (Republican)

Major party candidates in United States Senate election in Nevada, 2010

Describing his political views, Ashjian stated to the Las Vegas Review-Journal that he espouses Tea Party views including limiting the role of government, and a strict interpretation of the United States Constitution. Ashjian aligns himself with the conservative views of politicians Ronald Reagan, Ron Paul and Sarah Palin. He said in April 2010 that he was "100 percent sure" he would win the election and beat opponents Harry Reid and Sharron Angle in the November 2010 general election, "by a large margin". He explained that he filed to run for U.S. Senate, because individuals in Nevada who identified with Tea Party values had been "duped by the Republican Party". Ashjian noted, "The GOP is trying to co-opt the Tea Party. That is one of the reasons I did what I did. I don't see a difference between Democrats and Republicans." Ashjian stated he did not think Sharron Angle would be able to win the U.S. Senate race against Harry Reid, and stated "Republican attack committees are running the (national) Tea Party show." In May 2010 Ashjian asserted to the Las Vegas Review-Journal, "I will pick up a large percentage of votes on both sides (Republican and Democrat) and those in the middle."

Ashjian's political campaign was structured as a grass-roots movement. The candidate served as his own communications director, and relied on his family and friends for assistance. His campaign website contained the declaration, "I am running because I love my country and Harry Reid, Nancy Pelosi and Barack Obama are ruining it. It is time to take our country back and I am asking you to join me in this fight."

Ashjian stated in an interview with the Las Vegas Review-Journal, "I'm a frustrated patriot. I'm not a politician. I'm not savvy with radio and TV. But I believe I can make a change, and that's what I'm here for. I'm here to give people a third choice." When asked to characterize the Tea Party of Nevada, Ashjian responded, "We're not Republican or Democrat. We won't fold into one party or the other. We're a tax-paying party that can make a difference and a party of normal people who want change. Bigger government and higher taxes is not working. Right now we're at a real crossroads to make change, and the bottom line is there's never been so much disdain for politicians." He explained why he chose to run a minimalist campaign, "The political race is for the rich. Why would (politicians) want to spend X millions of dollars on a campaign? It has to be for political gain. That disconnect is why I'm running for office." Ashjian asserted that results for voters would be similar with both major party candidates as opposed to a third option, "I'm here to say there is a choice. If you want to stick to the status quo, pick the Republicans or Democrats, but don't complain. Nobody can do a better job than I can." Regarding overtures from the Republican Party asking Ashjian to acquiesce to the two-party-system, Ashjian said, "By them saying I should fall in line is an insult. I'm not asking for an invitation. I think they should get behind me, not fall in line like sheep. They're so paranoid, it makes me think they have weak candidates and they're afraid. The more they attack, the more they show their hand, and I mean that across party lines. It's not politics as usual. We're running a different campaign, and they're scared to death."

In October 2010, Ashjian released a tape to the media of a recorded conversation he had with Sharron Angle where she asked him to drop out of the race. In the tape, Angle says that she cannot defeat Harry Reid with Ashjian on the ballot. Ashjian commented about the meeting, in an interview with the Las Vegas Review-Journal, "She asked that I support her, and I said, 'Why would I go and do that?'". He stated he would never entertain the notion of dropping out of the race, "She said, 'I can't win without you getting out of the race.' But I said I couldn't. I'm going to beat Harry Reid." He emphasized that he would not drop out of the race, "I call the shots. ... I fought too hard to be on the ballot to get off." Ashjian remarked of the pressure involved in running for office, "I've had personal threats against me and my family. I've had my phone tapped, and I've been followed." He commented that Angle was too close with the Republican Party, and therefore not a true outsider candidate. Ashjian sent a letter to Nevada Secretary of State Ross Miller in October 2010, asking that party abbreviations on ballots be removed.

On October 28, 2010, a second ruling by the Nevada Supreme Court again affirmed Ashjian's ability to stand as a candidate in the 2010 Nevada election for U.S. Senate. In the case, the office of the Secretary of State of Nevada had asserted that the effort to appeal the case to the Nevada Supreme Court was without merit, because voters had already received absentee ballots and a removal of the candidate's entry would have the impact of therefore disenfranchising voters. In its unanimous decision, the Nevada Supreme Court ruled, "(The) appellant's unexplained delay in prosecuting this appeal militates against disrupting the election process, which is already underway." One day before the U.S. Senate election, Ashjian received three percent in a survey from Public Policy Polling. Harry Reid won the race, and was reelected to the U.S. Senate.

== See also ==
- Opinion polling for the 2010 United States Senate elections, Nevada
- Tea Party Express
- Tea Party movement
- Tea Party Nation
- Tea Party Patriots
- Tea Party protests
- United States Senate election in Nevada, 2010
