= Northern Nevada Land Conservation and Economic Development Act =

- Long title: To authorize certain land conveyances involving public lands in northern Nevada to promote economic development and conservation, and for other purposes.
- Announced in: the 113th United States Congress
- Sponsored by: Rep. Mark E. Amodei (R, NV-2)
- Number of co-sponsors: 3

Codification
- Acts affected: Wilderness Act, Federal Land Policy and Management Act of 1976, Indian Gaming Regulatory Act, and others.
- U.S.C. sections affected: 16 U.S.C. § 1133, 16 U.S.C. § 1131 et seq., 43 U.S.C. § 1712, 43 U.S.C. § 1713, 43 U.S.C. § 1782, and others.
- Agencies affected: United States Department of Agriculture, United States Bureau of Reclamation, United States Forest Service, United States Department of the Navy, United States Department of the Interior, Bureau of Land Management

Legislative history
- Introduced in the House as H.R. 5205 by Rep. Mark E. Amodei (R, NV-2) on July 25, 2014; Committee consideration by United States House Committee on Natural Resources; Passed the House on September 15, 2014 (voice vote)

The Northern Nevada Land Conservation and Economic Development Act (H.R. 5205) is a bill that would require the Bureau of Land Management (BLM) to convey certain federal lands in Nevada to other government entities. The bill was a package of several different smaller bills related to land in Nevada.

The bill was introduced into the United States House of Representatives during the 113th United States Congress.

== Provisions ==
The bill is an omnibus bill that contains seven other bills within it. One portion of the bill, called the "Lyon County Economic Development and Conservation Act", would give permission for Yerington, Nevada, to join with Nevada Copper in purchasing some land from the Bureau of Land Management. Another portion of the bill would designate an additional 74,000 acres of land as federal wilderness.

== Congressional Budget Office report ==
This summary is based largely on the summary provided by the Congressional Budget Office, as ordered reported by the House Committee on Natural Resources on July 30, 2014. This is a public domain source.

H.R. 5205 would require the Bureau of Land Management (BLM) to convey certain federal lands in Nevada to other government entities. The bill also would designate 73,500 acres as wilderness. Finally, the bill would require the United States Secretary of the Interior to take certain lands into trust for the benefit of the Te-moak Tribe. Based on information provided by the affected agencies and assuming appropriation of the necessary amounts, the Congressional Budget Office (CBO) estimates that implementing the bill would cost less than $500,000. In addition, CBO estimates that enacting H.R. 5205 would increase offsetting receipts, which are treated as reductions in direct spending, by $2 million in 2015; therefore, pay-as-you-go procedures apply. Enacting the legislation would not affect revenues.

H.R. 5205 contains no intergovernmental or private-sector mandates as defined in the Unfunded Mandates Reform Act. Conveyances of federal land authorized in the bill would benefit cities and counties in Nevada. Any costs to those entities would be incurred voluntarily as conditions of land conveyances. The Te-moak Tribe of the Western Shoshone Indians of Nevada would benefit from federal land being taken into trust by the federal government on their behalf.

== Procedural history ==
The Northern Nevada Land Conservation and Economic Development Act was introduced into the United States House of Representatives on July 25, 2014, by Rep. Mark E. Amodei (R, NV-2). The bill was referred to the United States House Committee on Natural Resources. On September 15, 2014, the House voted to pass the bill in a voice vote.

== Debate and discussion ==
Rep. Amodei, who introduced the bill, called it a "bipartisan, consensus package" but also said that "I'm quite frankly worried about the ability to get anything through the Senate right now."

Senator Harry Reid (D-NV) was in favor of the bill and said that "these bills will bring much needed jobs to northern Nevada and protect some of Nevada's most distinctive landscapes and I will work with Senator Heller to ensure their passage in the Senate."

== See also ==
- List of bills in the 113th United States Congress
