= 1970 United States Senate election in Nevada =

- November 3, 1970
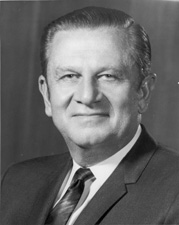

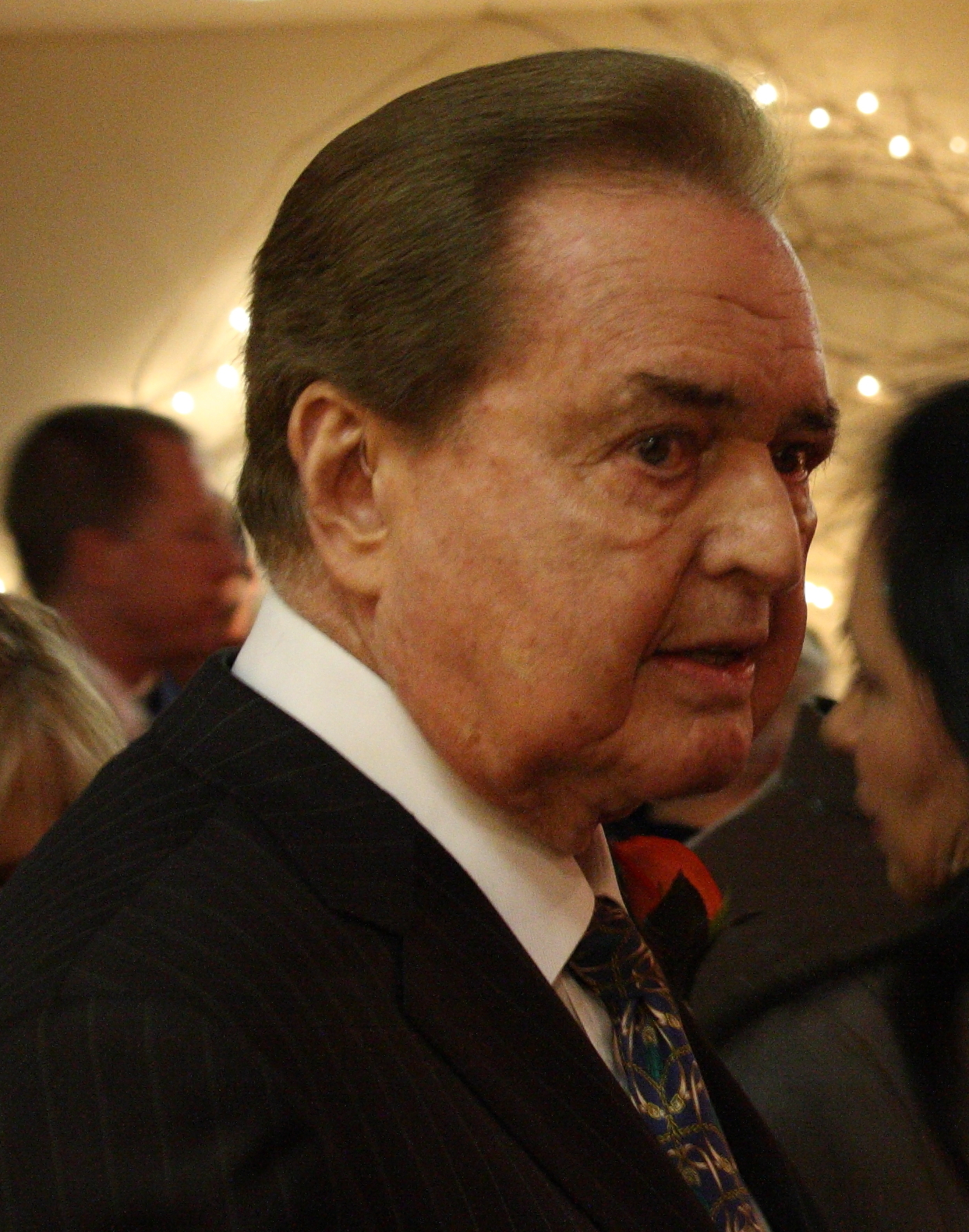
Nominee	Howard Cannon	William Raggio
Party	Democratic	Republican
Popular vote	85,187	60,838
Percentage	57.65%	41.17%
- County results Cannon: 40–50% 50–60% 60–70% Raggio: 50–60% 60–70%
U.S. senator before election
Howard Cannon
Democratic
Elected U.S. Senator
Howard Cannon
Democratic

The 1970 United States Senate election in Nevada was held on November 3, 1970. Incumbent Democratic U.S. Senator Howard Cannon won re-election to a third term.

== General election ==
=== Candidates ===
- Howard Cannon, incumbent U.S. Senator (Democratic)
- Harold G. DeSellem (American Independent)
- William Raggio, Washoe County District Attorney (Republican)

=== Campaign ===
In the Senate, Cannon was known as a moderate in the Democratic Party. He served as chairman of several committees, including the rules committee and the inaugural arrangements committee. Cannon was nearly defeated for re-election in 1964 by Republican Lieutenant Governor Paul Laxalt in one of the closest elections in history. However, he became more popular over the next few years and defeated D.A. William Raggio, whose 1970 senate campaign began his long political career. Raggio ran for the Nevada Senate in 1972 and won, serving until 2011.

=== Results ===
General election results
Party	Candidate	Votes	%	±%
Democratic	Howard Cannon (Incumbent)	85,187	57.65%	+7.63%
Republican	William Raggio	60,838	41.17%	−8.81%
American Independent	Harold G. DeSellem	1,743	1.18%	New
Majority		24,349	16.48%	+16.44%
Turnout		147,768		
Democratic hold		Swing		

== See also ==
- 1970 United States Senate elections
