= Mark Amodei =

American politician (born 1958)

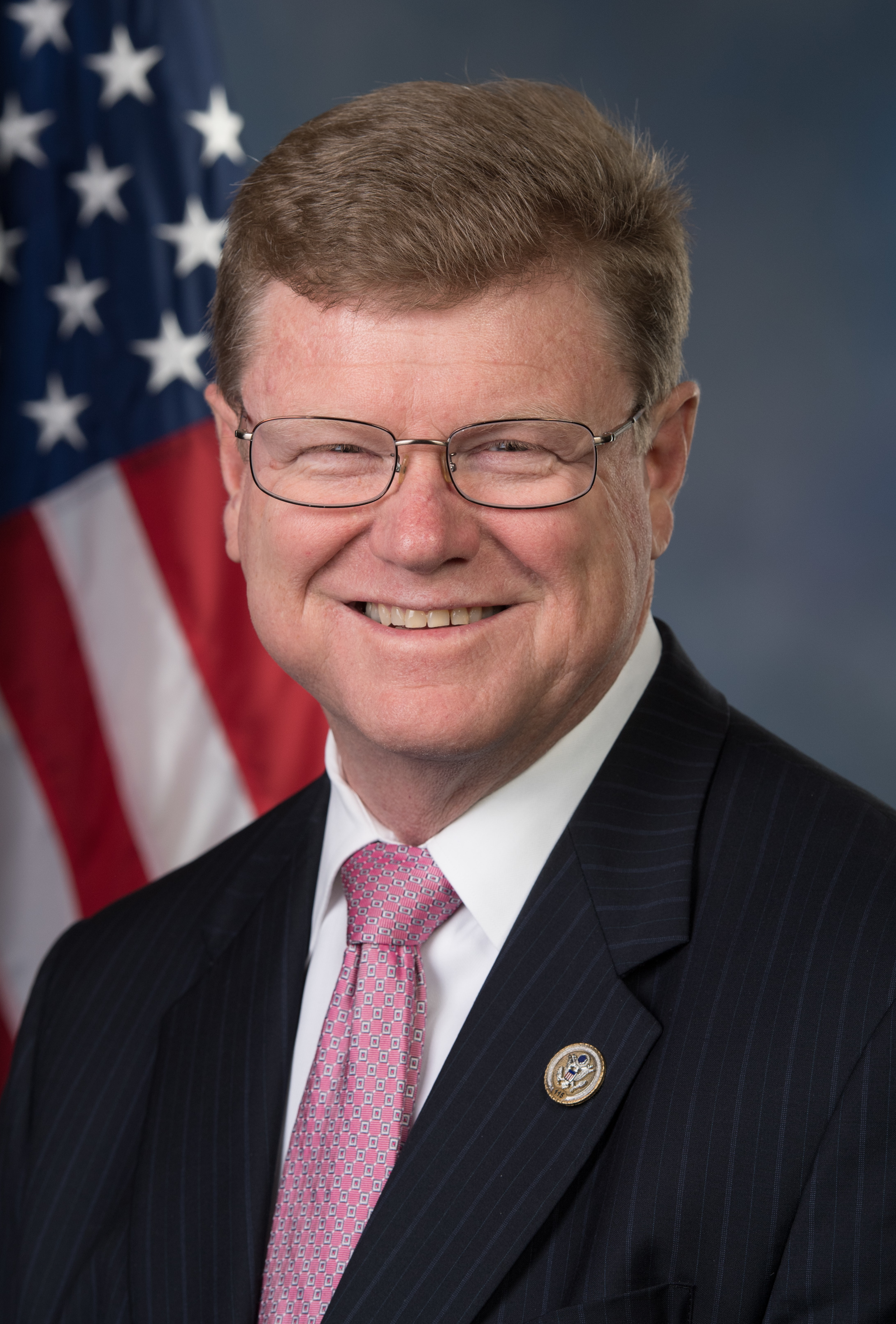
- Official portrait, 2017

Member of the U.S. House of Representatives from Nevada's 2nd district
- Incumbent
- Assumed office September 13, 2011 (Note: Amodei's official service begins on the date of the special election, while he was not sworn in until September 15, 2011.)
- Preceded by: Dean Heller

Chair of the Nevada Republican Party
- In office May 15, 2010 – June 17, 2011
- Preceded by: Chris Comfort
- Succeeded by: Amy Tarkanian

Member of the Nevada Senate from the 17th district
- In office February 1, 1999 – February 7, 2011
- Preceded by: Ernie Adler
- Succeeded by: James Settelmeyer

Member of the Nevada Assembly from the 40th district
- In office January 20, 1997 – February 1, 1999
- Preceded by: Thomas Fettic
- Succeeded by: Bonnie Parnell

Personal details
- Born: Mark Eugene Amodei; June 12, 1958 (age 68) Carson City, Nevada, U.S.
- Party: Republican
- Spouses: Sondra Amodei (divorced); Michelle Amodei (divorced)
- Children: 2
- Education: University of Nevada, Reno (BA); University of the Pacific (JD)
- Website: House website Campaign website

Military service
- Branch/service: United States Army
- Years of service: 1983–1987
- Rank: Captain
- Awards: Meritorious Service Medal; Army Commendation Medal; Army Achievement Medal
- Amodei's voice Amodei supporting the Pershing County Economic Development and Conservation Act. Recorded January 16, 2018

Mark Eugene Amodei (/ˈæmədeɪ/ AM-ə-day; born June 12, 1958) is an American lawyer and politician serving as the U.S. representative for Nevada's 2nd congressional district since 2011. Previously, Amodei served in the Nevada Assembly from 1997 to 1999 and in the Nevada Senate from 1999 to 2011. He is a member of the Republican Party, chairing the Nevada Republican Party from 2010 to 2011.

A moderate Republican and member of the centrist Republican Governance Group, Amodei was first elected to Congress in a 2011 special election.

Since 2019, Amodei has been the dean of Nevada's congressional delegation, as well as its only Republican. On February 6, 2026, Amodei announced he would not seek re-election in 2026.

== Early life, education and military service ==
Amodei was born in Carson City, Nevada, on June 12, 1958, the son of Joy LaRhe (née Longero) and Donald Mark Amodei. His father was of half Italian and half Irish descent, and one of his maternal great-grandfathers was Italian. Amodei graduated from Carson High School in 1976, where he was student class president. He graduated from the University of Nevada in 1980 with a Bachelor of Arts degree in political science, and received his Juris Doctor from the University of the Pacific McGeorge School of Law in 1983.

When Amodei entered the U.S. Army, he had not yet passed the bar exam, so he was assigned to an artillery unit. He attended The JAG School at the University of Virginia and entered U.S. Army JAG Corps after passing the bar. He became an Army JAG Corps officer prosecuting criminal matters, an Assistant U.S. Attorney and Assistant Post Judge Advocate. He was awarded the Army Achievement Medal, the Army Commendation Medal and the Meritorious Service Medal. He served with the United States Army Judge Advocate General Corps from 1983 to 1987. He returned home to become an attorney with the law firms Allison MacKenzie in Carson City and Kummer Kaempfer Bonner Renshaw and Ferrario (now Kaempfer Crowell) in Reno. He served as a lawyer with Allison, MacKenzie from 1987 to 2004 and with Kummer from 2004 to 2007.

As a lawyer, Amodei has been a sole practitioner since 2009. He served as president of the Nevada Mining Association from 2007 to 2008.

== Nevada legislature ==
=== Elections ===
In 1996, Amodei was elected to the Nevada Assembly, representing Carson City. In 1998, he ran for the Nevada Senate in the Capital District. He defeated incumbent Democratic State Senator Ernie Adler, 52%–48%. In 2002, he was reelected to a second term with 84% of the vote. In 2006, he was reelected to a third term with 78% of the vote.

=== Tenure ===
Amodei was named the Outstanding Freshman Legislator in 1997. He was selected to serve as president pro tempore of the Nevada Senate from 2003 to 2008.

2003 tax increase

In 2003 Amodei and Terry Care co-authored a plan to increase taxes in Nevada by $1 billion. The plan was offered as an alternative to Governor Kenny Guinn's plan, which called for over $1 billion in revenue increases. The final plan raised taxes by $873 million.

Collective bargaining

In 2009, Amodei supported a proposal to expand collective bargaining rights for state workers, who he believed were unfairly treated during the budget process.

Gas tax

In 2009, Amodei sponsored a bill that would have allowed for a gas tax increase in Washoe County; the plan gained public approval in an advisory vote.

Medical liability reform

In 2003, Amodei voted against a tort reform bill that would have changed Nevada's medical liability law. He was the only Republican senator to vote against the bill.

=== Committee assignments ===
Amodei has served on the Legislative Commission, the Education Commission of the States, the Public Lands Committee, the Tahoe Regional Planning Agency Legislative Oversight Committee, as vice chair of the Governor's Task Force on Access to Public Health Care, as chair of the Education Technology Committee, and as a member of the Nevada Supreme Court's committee on court funding.

== 2010 U.S. Senate election ==
Amodei ran for the Republican nomination for U.S. Senate against incumbent Democrat Harry Reid, but dropped out before election day.

== U.S. House of Representatives ==
=== Elections ===
==== 2011 ====
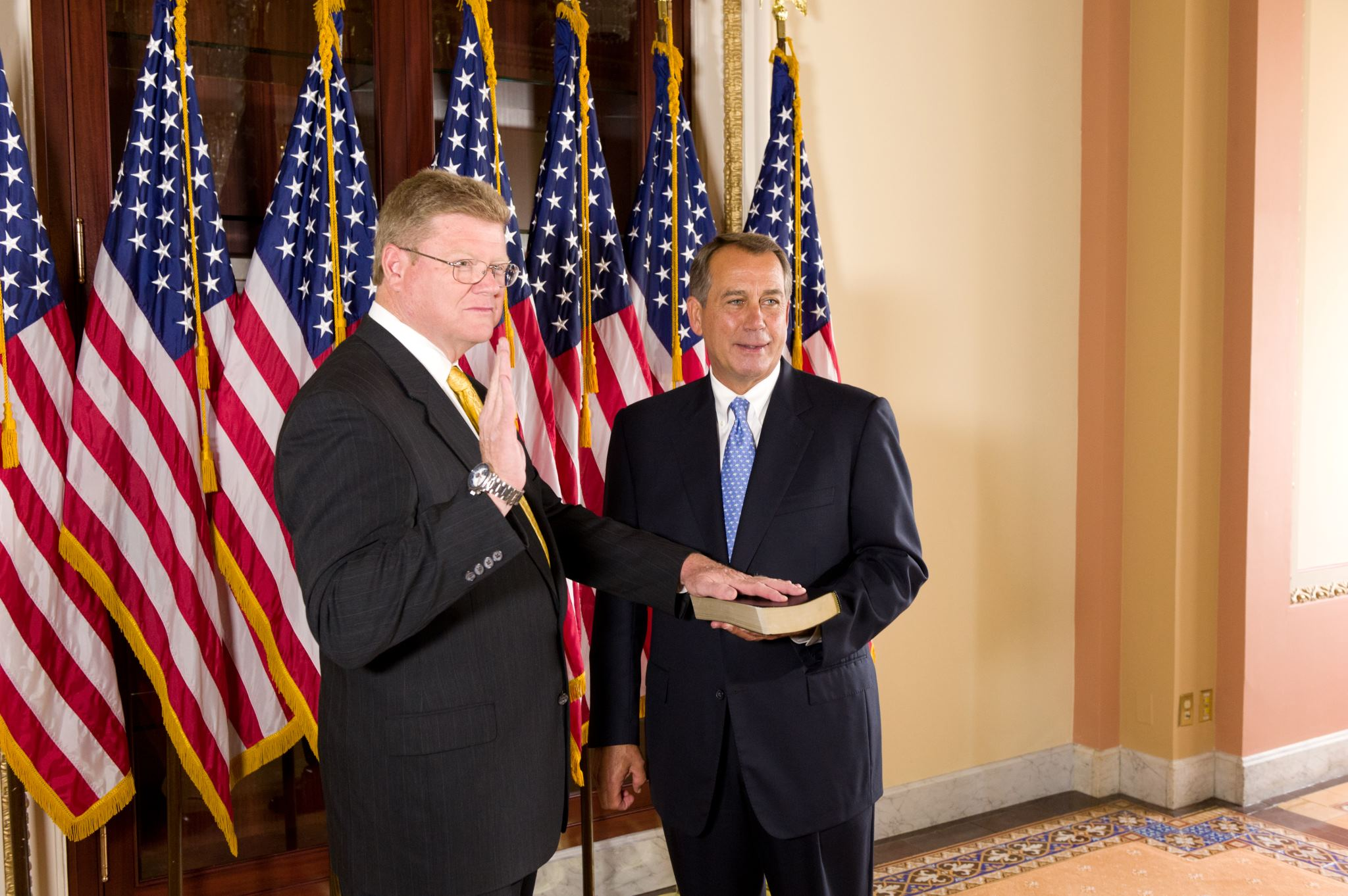
Amodei being sworn-in by then-Speaker of the House John Boehner.

On September 13, 2011, Nevada's 2nd congressional district elected Amodei to replace U.S. Representative Dean Heller. Heller had been appointed to fill John Ensign's seat in the U.S. Senate after Ensign resigned from the position. Amodei announced his bid for the congressional seat in May 2011. The next month, he won the Republican nomination by taking 221 out of 323 ballots. In the primary, he defeated State Senator Greg Brower, who received 56 votes, and U.S. Navy veteran Kirk Lippold, who received 46 votes.

Amodei defeated Democratic nominee Kate Marshall 58%–36%. He won every county in the district.

==== 2012 ====
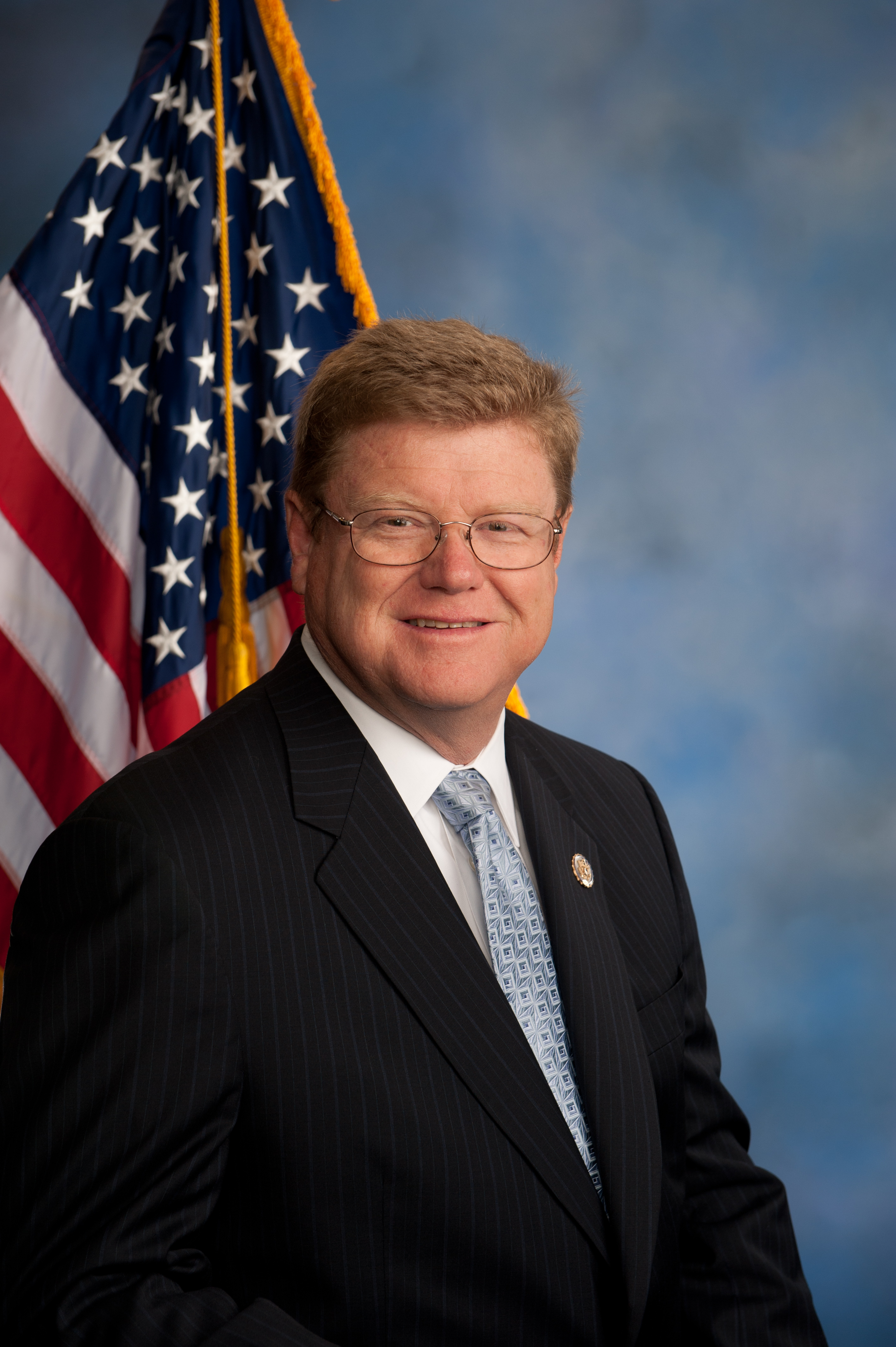
Amodei during the 112th Congress

Amodei ran for a full term against Democrat Samuel Koepnick. He was endorsed by the NRA Political Victory Fund. He did so in a district that had been made slightly more compact than its predecessor in redistricting. It lost almost all of its southern portion to the new 4th district. Even so, it was still the eighth-largest district in the country that did not cover an entire state. Amodei defeated Koepnick 58%–36%.

==== 2014 ====
Amodei ran for reelection to his second full term. He defeated Democrat Kristen Spees, 65.8% to 27.9%.

==== 2016 ====
Amodei ran for reelection to a third full term. He defeated Democrat Chip Evans, 58.3% to 36.9%.

==== 2018 ====
Amodei ran for reelection to a fourth full term. He defeated Democrat Clint Koble, 58.2% to 41.8%.

==== 2020 ====
Amodei ran for reelection to a fifth full term. He defeated Democrat Patricia Ackerman, 56.5% to 40.7%.

==== 2022 ====
2022 GOP primary results by county: 40–50% Amodei 50–60% Amodei

Amodei ran for reelection to a sixth full term. His voting record prompted several primary challengers for the Republican nomination, with four candidates running against him. Amodei won the crowded primary with 54.9% of the vote. The Congressional Leadership Fund, the super PAC endorsed by Kevin McCarthy, spent over $200,000 supporting him in the primary.

Amodei went on to defeat Democrat Elizabeth Krause in the general election, 59.7% to 37.8%

==== 2024 ====
2024 GOP primary results by county: 50–60% Amodei 60–70% Amodei 70–80% Amodei

Amodei ran for reelection to a seventh full term. He won the Republican primary with 64% of the vote, and went on to win in the general election with 55% of the vote against Independent candidate Greg Kidd.

=== Tenure ===
Amodei was sworn in on September 15, 2011.

Amodei voted against the bill to end the United States federal government shutdown of 2013. Of the vote, he said, "During two campaigns, I told Nevadans I would give my full attention to such issues as reining in runaway federal spending, debt, and the harmful aspects of the Affordable Care Act. Unlike many in this town, I will not test your memories and hope you have forgotten. I will continue to pursue these necessary goals. Nothing in this legislation changes the real threats to our country's economy."

Amodei received a 0% rating from Planned Parenthood's 2014 Congressional Scorecard for supporting a nationwide abortion ban after 20 weeks and banning abortion access in the District of Columbia and through the Patient Protection and Affordable Care Act.

A moderate Republican and member of the centrist Republican Governance Group, Amodei was the first House Republican to support a formal impeachment inquiry into President Donald Trump in his first impeachment on September 27, 2019. National news media began to refer to Amodei as the first House Republican to support impeachment. A spokesman then further clarified his position by stating Amodei supported an inquiry but not impeachment.

==== Government spending ====
In June 2025, Amodei was one of 4 House Republicans to vote against a $9.4 billion rescissions package backed by the Trump administration and the Department of Government Efficiency.

==== Immigration ====
Amodei voted for the Further Consolidated Appropriations Act of 2020, which authorized DHS to nearly double the available H-2B visas for the remainder of FY 2020.

Amodei voted for the Consolidated Appropriations Act (H.R. 1158), which effectively prohibits ICE from cooperating with Health and Human Services to detain or remove illegal alien sponsors of unaccompanied alien children (UACs).

Amodei supports Deferred Action for Childhood Arrivals (DACA).

In 2024, as chair of the Homeland Security subcommittee in the Appropriations Committee, Amodei cast doubt on the logistics of mass deportations for the incoming Trump administration, and suggested that long-settled illegal immigrants should be treated with leniency.

==== Israel-Palestine ====
Amodei voted to provide Israel with financial support following October 7 attacks.

==== LGBT rights ====
In 2021, Amodei was one of 18 House Republicans to sponsor the Fairness for All Act, the Republican alternative to the Equality Act. The bill's stated goal is to prohibit discrimination on the basis of sex, sexual orientation, and gender identity, and simultaneously protect the free exercise of religion.

In December 2022, Amodei voted against the Respect for Marriage Act, which codified federal recognition of same-sex and interracial marriages. He stated that his opposition was based on the belief that Nevada voters had already approved same-sex marriage through a 2020 referendum, and that federal legislation on an issue traditionally governed by states was unnecessary. He also referred to the bill as a “messaging bill” that lacked proper hearings and consideration.

In April 2023, Amodei voted in favor of the Protect Women and Girls in Sports Act, a bill that would prohibit transgender women and girls from participating in school sports programs designated for females. The bill passed the House of Representatives on a party-line vote but did not advance in the Senate.

=== Legislation ===
On July 25, 2014, Amodei introduced the Northern Nevada Land Conservation and Economic Development Act (H.R. 5205; 113th Congress), a bill that would require the Bureau of Land Management to convey certain federal lands in Nevada to other government entities. The bill is a package of numerous other bills related to land conveyance in Nevada, which make up the bulk of Amodei's legislation.

=== Controversies and criticism ===
==== 2014 ethics complaint over campaign material ====
In October 2014, Amodei’s Democratic challenger Kristen Spees filed a complaint with the Office of Congressional Ethics, alleging that his campaign improperly used official congressional web domains to promote campaign material—raising concerns about the separation of government resources from partisan activity. The complaint did not result in any formal sanctions.

==== Public land transfers ====
In 2015, the Republican-controlled Nevada Legislature passed a resolution urging Congress to transfer millions of acres of federally managed land to state control. Following this, in 2016, Amodei introduced the Honor the Nevada Enabling Act of 1864, which proposed transferring large amounts of federal public land back to Nevada. However, after public backlash from recreationists, hunters, and other local stakeholders during town halls across the state, Amodei withdrew the legislation in 2017.

==== Handling of student phone call ====
In March 2018, Amodei defended his office's decision to contact Robert McQueen High School after a student, Noah Christiansen, called the congressman’s office and used profane language while urging support for gun control legislation. During the call, Christiansen criticized lawmakers for inaction on gun violence, reportedly telling staff to “get off their f---ing asses” and support raising the minimum age to purchase a gun and banning bump stock devices. After the school was contacted by Amodei’s office, Christiansen was briefly suspended, prompting criticism from the ACLU of Nevada, which accused the congressman’s office of retaliation and infringing on the student’s free speech rights.

==== Support for Representative Marjorie Taylor Greene ====
In February 2021, Amodei voted against a bipartisan resolution to remove Representative Marjorie Taylor Greene from her House committee assignments. Greene had faced widespread criticism for endorsing conspiracy theories and making inflammatory remarks—including comments about the 2017 Las Vegas shooting. Amodei defended his vote as opposition to what he characterized as partisan hypocrisy. Nevada Democratic leaders criticized his decision as enabling extremist rhetoric in Congress.

==== Vote against January 6 Commission ====
In May 2021, Amodei voted against H.R. 3233, the bill to establish an independent, bipartisan commission to investigate the January 6 United States Capitol attack. He described the event as a tragedy but argued that the proposal had become “hyper‑politicized” and might duplicate existing congressional investigations. Critics said his vote undermined accountability following the insurrection.

==== Constituent engagement and missed votes ====
Rep. Amodei has not held an open town hall for the general public since April 2017, when he co‑hosted an event with then‑Senator Dean Heller in Reno on health care and immigration. Since then, he has hosted only limited-topic meetings (e.g., for veterans). In March 2025, he referred to town halls as a “code word for, ‘Let’s go bully the shit out of somebody in public,’” prompting backlash from constituents and civic groups demanding greater accessibility.

Advocates have organized protests and petitions—particularly in Northern Nevada—calling for him to meet with voters face-to-face.

Amodei has also been criticized for missing more votes than the median member of the House during 2024–2025. Watchdog groups cited his attendance record as a concern for accountability.

==== Ending Presidential Overreach on Public Lands Act ====
In February 2025, Amodei introduced the Ending Presidential Overreach on Public Lands Act, which would require congressional approval for national monument designations under the Antiquities Act of 1906. Criticism came from environmental organizations and Indigenous leaders—who warned the bill would weaken protections for lands like Avi Kwa Ame National Monument in Nevada.

==== Budget amendment to sell public lands ====
In May 2025, during budget reconciliation, Amodei co-sponsored a last-minute amendment authorizing the sale or exchange of up to 450,000 acres of Nevada public lands across counties including Clark, Washoe, Lyon, and Pershing. The proceeds were directed to the U.S. Treasury for federal tax cuts, rather than remaining in local conservation or infrastructure funds.

The amendment drew harsh criticism from Nevada tribal governments, environmental groups, and the state’s Democratic delegation—who called it a “dead-of-night” betrayal that undermined local revenue streams. Amodei defended the move as reflecting long-standing requests from local governments and as constrained by federal budget rules.

=== Committee assignments ===
For the 119th Congress:

- Committee on Appropriations
  - Subcommittee on Financial Services and General Government
  - Subcommittee on Homeland Security (Chair)
  - Subcommittee on Interior, Environment, and Related Agencies
- Committee on Natural Resources
  - Subcommittee on Federal Lands
  - Subcommittee on Oversight and Investigations

=== Caucus memberships ===
- Congressional Caucus on Turkey and Turkish Americans
- Congressional Western Caucus
- Climate Solutions Caucus
- U.S.-Japan Caucus
- Republican Governance Group
- Problem Solvers Caucus (former)
- Rare Disease Caucus

=== 2020 presidential election ===
Amodei did not join the majority of House Republican in signing an amicus brief in support of Texas v. Pennsylvania, a lawsuit filed at the United States Supreme Court contesting the results of the 2020 presidential election. Amodei voted to certify both Arizona's and Pennsylvania's results in the 2021 United States Electoral College vote count.

== Electoral history ==
1998 Nevada Senate election in the Capital District
Party	Candidate	Votes	%	±%
Republican	Mark E. Amodei	12,348	53%	
Democratic	Ernie Adler (Incumbent)	10,896	47%	
Majority		1,452	6%	
Turnout		23,244		
Republican gain from Democratic		Swing		

2002 Nevada Senate election in the Capital District
Party	Candidate	Votes	%	±%
Republican	Mark E. Amodei	25,368	82%	
Democratic	David Schumann	4,962	16%	
Republican hold		Swing		

2006 Nevada Senate election in the Capital District
Party	Candidate	Votes	%	±%
Republican	Mark E. Amodei	27,039	78%	
Democratic	Ike Yochum	7,761	22%	
Republican hold		Swing		

2011 Nevada 2nd Congressional District (Special Election)
Party	Candidate	Votes	%
Republican	Mark E. Amodei	74,976	58
Democratic	Kate Marshall	46,669	36
Independent	Helmuth Lehmann	5,354	4
Independent American	Timothy Fasano	2,415	2
Total votes		129,414	
Republican hold			

2012 Nevada 2nd Congressional District
Party	Candidate	Votes	%
Republican	Mark E. Amodei (Incumbent)	162,213	57.63
Democratic	Samuel Koepnick	103,019	36.25
Independent American	Michael L. Haines	11,166	3.97
Independent American	Russell Best	6,051	2.15
Total votes		281,449	100.0
Republican hold			

2014 Nevada 2nd Congressional District
Party	Candidate	Votes	%
Republican	Mark E. Amodei (Incumbent)	122,402	65.73
Democratic	Kristen Spees	52,016	27.93
Independent American	Janine Hansen	11,792	6.33
Total votes		186,210	100.0
Republican hold			

2016 Nevada 2nd Congressional District
Party	Candidate	Votes	%
Republican	Mark E. Amodei (Incumbent)	182,676	58.30
Democratic	H.D. "Chip" Evans	115,722	36.93
Independent American	John H. Everhart	8,693	2.77
No party affiliation	Drew Knight	6,245	1.99
Total votes		313,336	100.0
Republican hold			

2018 Nevada 2nd Congressional District
Party	Candidate	Votes	%
Republican	Mark E. Amodei (Incumbent)	167,435	58.23
Democratic	Clint Koble	120,102	41.77
Total votes		287,537	100.00
Republican hold			

2020 Nevada 2nd Congressional District
Party	Candidate	Votes	%
Republican	Mark E. Amodei (incumbent)	216,078	56.5
Democratic	Patricia Ackerman	155,780	40.7
Independent American	Janine Hansen	10,815	2.8
Total votes		382,673	100.0
Republican hold			

2022 Nevada 2nd Congressional District
Party	Candidate	Votes	%
Republican	Mark Amodei (incumbent)	185,467	59.7
Democratic	Elizabeth Mercedes Krause	117,371	37.8
Independent American	Russell Best	4,194	1.3
Libertarian	Darryl Baber	3,466	1.1
Total votes		310,678	100.0
Republican hold			

2024 Nevada 2nd congressional district election
Party	Candidate	Votes	%
Republican	Mark Amodei (incumbent)	219,919	55.0
Independent	Greg Kidd	144,064	36.1
Independent American	Lynn Chapman	19,784	4.9
Libertarian	Javi Tachiquin	15,817	4.0
Total votes		399,584	100.0
Republican hold			

== Personal life ==
Amodei has two adult daughters. He was previously married to Sondra Amodei (née Staub) and later to Michelle Amodei; both marriages ended in divorce.

Party political offices
Preceded by Chris Comfort	Chair of the Nevada Republican Party; 2010–2011	Succeeded by Amy Tarkanian
U.S. House of Representatives
Preceded by Dean Heller	Member of the U.S. House of Representatives from Nevada's 2nd congressional district 2011–present	Incumbent
U.S. order of precedence (ceremonial)
Preceded by Steve Womack	United States representatives by seniority 93rd	Succeeded by Suzanne Bonamici
