= Ernie Adler =

American politician (born 1950)

Member of the Nevada Senate from the 17th district
- In office November 7, 1990 – November 4, 1998
- Preceded by: Charlie Joerg
- Succeeded by: Mark Amodei

Member of the Nevada Assembly from the 40th district
- In office November 5, 1986 – November 7, 1990
- Succeeded by: Dean Heller

Personal details
- Born: Ernest Edward Adler; December 15, 1950 (age 75) Pullman, Washington, U.S.
- Party: Democratic
- Spouse: Sarah Mersereau-Adler
- Education: University of California, Santa Barbara (BA); University of San Diego School of Law (JD)

Ernest Edward Adler (born December 15, 1950) is an American politician who served as a Democratic member of the Nevada Assembly and Senate.

== Life and career ==
Born in Pullman, Washington, Adler attended Whitman College, earned a Bachelor of Arts at the University of California, Santa Barbara, and completed a Juris Doctor at University of San Diego School of Law.

In 1987, Adler was elected to the Nevada Assembly, serving until 1989. He served in the Nevada Senate from 1991 to 1998. He was defeated in his bid for re-election by Mark Amodei in 1998.
