= William Raggio =

American politician

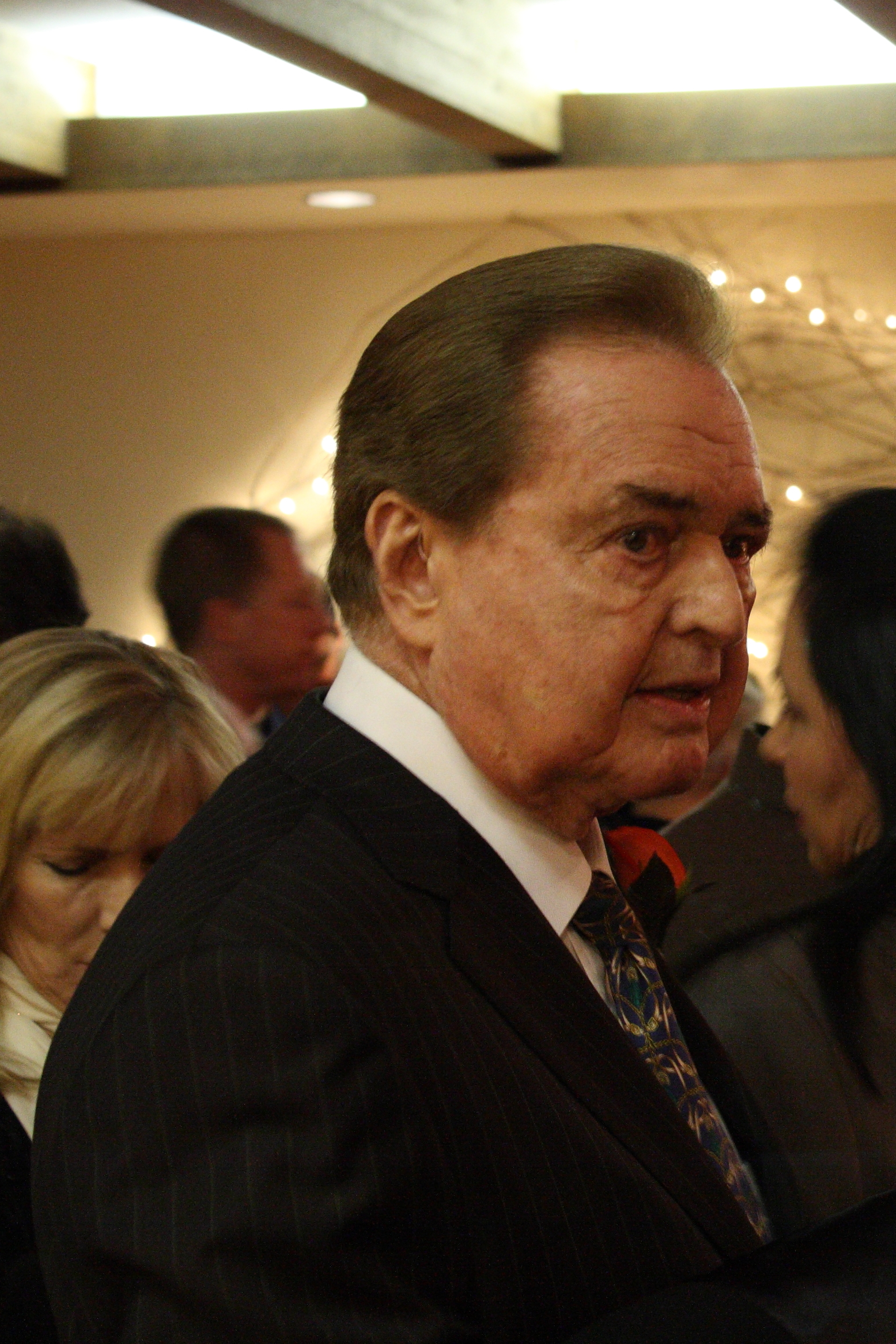

Member of the Nevada Senate from the Washoe 3rd district
- In office 1972–2011
- Succeeded by: Greg Brower

Personal details
- Born: October 30, 1926 Reno, Nevada, U.S.
- Died: February 23, 2012 (aged 85) Sydney, New South Wales
- Party: Republican
- Spouse: Dale
- Profession: Attorney

William Raggio (October 30, 1926 – February 23, 2012) was an American politician and a former Republican member of the Nevada Senate. He represented Washoe County's 3rd district from 1972 until his retirement in 2011. He is the longest-serving member in the history of the State Senate.

== Early life, education, and early career ==
Raggio was born in Reno, Nevada in 1926. He obtained his B.A. by attending Louisiana Tech University, University of Oklahoma, and University of Nevada, Reno, where he was a member of Alpha Tau Omega. He obtained his J.D. from the Hastings College of Law at the University of California and the Boalt Hall School of Law at University of California, Berkeley.

Raggio then joined the military. He was a member of the United States Navy Reserve (USNR) and became a Second Lieutenant of the United States Marine Corps Reserve (USMCR). Raggio started his legal career as an Assistant District Attorney of Washoe County (1952–1958) and was the D.A. of the county (1958–1970).

== Political career ==
=== 1970 U.S. Senate race ===
Raggio first ran for public office statewide in 1970 against incumbent Democrat U.S. Senator Howard Cannon, who defeated Raggio, the Republican nominee, with nearly 58% of the vote to serve a third term.

=== 1974 Lieutenant Governor race ===
Incumbent Democratic Lieutenant Governor of Nevada Harry Reid decided not to run for another term, in order to run for the U.S. Senate. This left an open seat. Democratic nominee Robert E. Rose defeated Raggio, the Republican nominee, with an estimated 52% of the vote statewide.

=== State Senate tenure (1972–2011) ===
Raggio served 12 special and 19 regular sessions, the longest Senate service in Nevada history. He was Senate Minority Floor Leader in 1977–1979, 1983–1986, 1991, and 2009. He was Senate Majority Floor Leader in 1987–1989 and 1993–2007. He was Chairman of the Interim Senate Finance Committee in 1988–1990, 1993–1994, 1997–1998, and 2001–2002. He was Chairman of the Senate Finance Committee from 1987 to 1989 and 1993–2005. He was also Chairman of the Legislative Committee on Education from 1997 to 1999 and 2001–2003.

== Death ==
On February 23, 2012, Raggio died at the age of 85 while on vacation in Sydney, Australia. His cause of death was reported as respiratory illness. Raggio fathered three children, Leslie, Tracy and Mark (d. 2004).

Party political offices
| Preceded by Paul Laxalt | Republican nominee for U.S. Senator from Nevada (Class 1); 1970 | Succeeded by David Towell |
